= 159th New York State Legislature =

New York state legislative session

←	158th	160th	→
- New York State Capitol (2009)

Overview
- Legislative body: New York State Legislature
- Jurisdiction: New York, United States
- Term: January 1 – December 31, 1936

Senate
- Members: 51
- President: Lt. Gov. M. William Bray (D)
- Temporary President: John J. Dunnigan (D)
- Party control: Democratic (29–22)

Assembly
- Members: 150
- Speaker: Irving M. Ives (R)
- Party control: Republican (81–69)

Sessions
- 1st: January 1 – May 13, 1936

The 159th New York State Legislature, consisting of the New York State Senate and the New York State Assembly, met from January 1 to May 13, 1936, during the fourth year of Herbert H. Lehman's governorship, in Albany.

== Background ==
Under the provisions of the New York Constitution of 1894, re-apportioned in 1917, 51 Senators and 150 assemblymen were elected in single-seat districts; senators for a two-year term, assemblymen for a one-year term. The senatorial districts consisted either of one or more entire counties; or a contiguous area within a single county. The counties which were divided into more than one senatorial district were New York (nine districts), Kings (eight), Bronx (three), Erie (three), Monroe (two), Queens (two) and Westchester (two). The Assembly districts were made up of contiguous area, all within the same county.

At this time there were two major political parties: the Democratic Party and the Republican Party. The Socialist Party and the Communist Party also nominated tickets. In New York City, a "City Fusion" and a "Jeffersonian" ticket were also nominated.

== Elections ==
The 1935 New York state election was held on November 5. No statewide elective offices were up for election.

Assemblywomen Doris I. Byrne (Dem.), a lawyer from the Bronx, and Jane H. Todd (Rep.), of Tarrytown, were re-elected.

== Sessions ==
The Legislature met for the regular session at the State Capitol in Albany on January 1, 1936; and adjourned on May 13.

Irving M. Ives (Rep.) was elected Speaker.

== State Senate ==
=== Districts ===
- 1st District: Nassau and Suffolk counties
- 2nd and 3rd District: Parts of Queens County, i.e. the Borough of Queens
- 4th, 5th, 6th, 7th, 8th, 9th, 10th and 11th District: Parts of Kings County, i.e. the Borough of Brooklyn
- 12th, 13th, 14th, 15th, 16th, 17th, 18th, 19th and 20th District: Parts of New York County, i.e. the Borough of Manhattan
- 21st, 22nd and 23rd District: Parts of Bronx County, i.e. the Borough of the Bronx
- 24th District: Richmond County, i.e. the Borough of Richmond (now the Borough of Staten Island), and Rockland County
- 25th District: Part of Westchester County
- 26th District: Cortlandt, Greenburgh, Mount Pleasant, Ossining and part of Yonkers; in Westchester County
- 27th District: Orange and Sullivan counties
- 28th District: Columbia, Dutchess and Putnam counties
- 29th District: Delaware, Greene and Ulster counties
- 30th District: Albany County
- 31st District: Rensselaer County
- 32nd District: Saratoga and Schenectady counties
- 33rd District: Clinton, Essex, Warren and Washington counties
- 34th District: Franklin and St. Lawrence counties
- 35th District: Fulton, Hamilton, Herkimer and Lewis counties
- 36th District: Oneida County
- 37th District: Jefferson and Oswego counties
- 38th District: Onondaga County
- 39th District: Madison, Montgomery, Otsego and Schoharie counties
- 40th District: Broome, Chenango and Cortland counties
- 41st District: Chemung, Schuyler, Tioga and Tompkins counties
- 42nd District: Cayuga, Seneca and Wayne counties
- 43rd District: Ontario, Steuben and Yates counties
- 44th District: Allegany, Genesee, Livingston and Wyoming
- 45th and 46th District: Monroe County
- 47th District: Niagara and Orleans counties
- 48th, 49th and 50th District: Erie County
- 51st District: Cattaraugus and Chautauqua counties

=== Members ===
The asterisk (*) denotes members of the previous Legislature who continued in office as members of this Legislature. Jacob H. Livingston and Harry F. Dunkel changed from the Assembly to the Senate.

Note: For brevity, the chairmanships omit the words "...the Committee on (the)..."

District	Senator	Party	Notes
1st	George L. Thompson*	Republican	
2nd	Joseph D. Nunan Jr.*	Democrat	
3rd	Frank B. Hendel*	Democrat	
4th	Philip M. Kleinfeld*	Democrat	
5th	John J. Howard*	Democrat	
6th	Edward J. Coughlin*	Democrat	
7th	Jacob J. Schwartzwald*	Democrat	
8th	Joseph A. Esquirol*	Democrat	
9th	Jacob H. Livingston*	Democrat	elected to fill vacancy, in place of Henry L. O'Brien
10th	Jeremiah F. Twomey*	Democrat	Chairman of Finance
11th	James J. Crawford*	Democrat	
12th	Elmer F. Quinn*	Democrat	
13th	Thomas F. Burchill*	Democrat	
14th	Samuel Mandelbaum*	Democrat	on June 20, 1936, appointed to the U.S. District; Court for the Southern District of New York
15th	John L. Buckley*	Democrat	
16th	John J. McNaboe*	Democrat	
17th	Joseph Clark Baldwin*	Republican	
18th	John T. McCall*	Democrat	
19th	Duncan T. O'Brien*	Democrat	
20th	A. Spencer Feld*	Democrat	
21st	Lazarus Joseph*	Democrat	
22nd	Julius S. Berg*	Democrat	
23rd	John J. Dunnigan*	Democrat	Temporary President
24th	Rae L. Egbert*	Democrat	
25th	Pliny W. Williamson*	Republican	
26th	James A. Garrity*	Democrat	
27th	Thomas C. Desmond*	Republican	
28th	Frederic H. Bontecou*	Republican	
29th	Arthur H. Wicks*	Rep./Soc.	
30th	William T. Byrne*	Democrat	on November 3, 1936, elected to the 75th U.S. Congress
31st	Ogden J. Ross*	Democrat	
32nd	Edwin E. Miller*	Republican	
33rd	Benjamin F. Feinberg*	Republican	
34th	Rhoda Fox Graves*	Republican	
35th	Harry F. Dunkel*	Republican	elected to fill vacancy, in place of Henry I. Patrie
36th	William H. Hampton*	Republican	
37th	Perley A. Pitcher*	Republican	
38th	George R. Fearon*	Republican	Minority Leader
39th	Walter W. Stokes*	Republican	
40th	Martin W. Deyo*	Republican	
41st	C. Tracey Stagg*	Republican	
42nd	Charles J. Hewitt*	Republican	
43rd	Earle S. Warner*	Republican	
44th	Joe R. Hanley*	Republican	
45th	George B. Kelly*	Democrat	on November 3, 1936, elected to the 75th U.S. Congress
46th	Norman A. O'Brien*	Democrat	
47th	William H. Lee*	Republican	
48th	David E. Doyle*	Democrat	
49th	Stephen J. Wojtkowiak*	Democrat	
50th	Nelson W. Cheney*	Republican	
51st	Leigh G. Kirkland*	Republican	

=== Employees ===
- Clerk: James J. Reilly

== State Assembly ==
=== Assemblymen ===
Note: For brevity, the chairmanships omit the words "...the Committee on (the)..."

District		Assemblymen	Party	Notes
Albany	1st	Erastus Corning 2nd	Democrat	
Albany	2nd	John P. Hayes*	Democrat	
Albany	3rd	S. Earl McDermott*	Democrat	
Allegany		William H. MacKenzie	Republican	
Bronx	1st	Matthew J. H. McLaughlin*	Democrat	
Bronx	2nd	Doris I. Byrne*	Democrat	
Bronx	3rd	Carl Pack*	Democrat	
Bronx	4th	Samuel Weisman*	Democrat	
Bronx	5th	Julius J. Gans	Democrat	
Bronx	6th	Peter A. Quinn	Democrat	
Bronx	7th	Bernard R. Fleisher	Democrat	
Bronx	8th	John A. Devany Jr.*	Democrat	
Broome	1st	Edward F. Vincent*	Republican	
Broome	2nd	James E. Hill*	Republican	
Cattaraugus		James W. Riley*	Republican	
Cayuga		Andrew D. Burgdorf*	Republican	
Chautauqua	1st	Lloyd J. Babcock*	Republican	
Chautauqua	2nd	Carl E. Darling	Republican	
Chemung		Chauncey B. Hammond*	Republican	
Chenango		Irving M. Ives*	Republican	elected Speaker; Chairman of Rules
Clinton		McKenzie B. Stewart*	Republican	
Columbia		Frederick A. Washburn*	Republican	
Cortland		Albert Haskell Jr.*	Republican	
Delaware		E. Ogden Bush*	Republican	Chairman of Public Health
Dutchess	1st	Howard N. Allen*	Republican	Chairman of Agriculture
Dutchess	2nd	Emerson D. Fite*	Republican	
Erie	1st	Frank A. Gugino	Republican	
Erie	2nd	Harold B. Ehrlich*	Republican	
Erie	3rd	Frank X. Bernhardt	Republican	
Erie	4th	Anthony J. Canney*	Democrat	
Erie	5th	Edwin L. Kantowski*	Democrat	
Erie	6th	Fred Koehler	Republican	
Erie	7th	Arthur L. Swartz*	Republican	Chairman of Penal Institutions
Erie	8th	R. Foster Piper*	Republican	Chairman of Insurance
Essex		Thomas A. Leahy	Republican	
Franklin		John H. Black*	Republican	
Fulton and Hamilton		Denton D. Lake	Republican	
Genesee		Herbert A. Rapp*	Republican	Chairman of Motor Vehicles
Greene		Paul Fromer	Republican	
Herkimer		David C. Wightman*	Republican	
Jefferson		Russell Wright	Republican	
Kings	1st	Crawford W. Hawkins*	Democrat	
Kings	2nd	Albert D. Schanzer*	Democrat	
Kings	3rd	Michael J. Gillen*	Democrat	
Kings	4th	Bernard Austin*	Democrat	
Kings	5th	Charles R. McConnell*	Democrat	
Kings	6th	Robert J. Crews	Rep./City F.	
Kings	7th	William Kirnan*	Dem./Jeff.	
Kings	8th	James V. Mangano*	Democrat	
Kings	9th	Edgar F. Moran	Democrat	
Kings	10th	William C. McCreery*	Dem./Jeff.	
Kings	11th	Bernard J. Moran*	Democrat	
Kings	12th	Edward S. Moran Jr.*	Democrat	
Kings	13th	Ralph Schwartz*	Democrat	
Kings	14th	Aaron F. Goldstein*	Democrat	
Kings	15th	Edward P. Doyle*	Democrat	
Kings	16th	Carmine J. Marasco*	Democrat	
Kings	17th	George W. Stewart*	Democrat	
Kings	18th	Irwin Steingut*	Democrat	Minority Leader
Kings	19th	George Kaminsky*	Democrat	
Kings	20th	Eugene J. Keogh	Democrat	on November 3, 1936, elected to the 75th U.S. Congress
Kings	21st	Charles H. Breitbart*	Democrat	
Kings	22nd	Clement A. Shelton	Democrat	
Kings	23rd	G. Thomas LoRe*	Democrat	
Lewis		Fred A. Young	Republican	
Livingston		James J. Wadsworth*	Republican	Chairman of Public Welfare and Relief
Madison		Wheeler Milmoe*	Republican	
Monroe	1st	Pritchard H. Strong	Republican	
Monroe	2nd	Charles R. Haggerty	Republican	
Monroe	3rd	Earl C. Langenbacher*	Democrat	
Monroe	4th	Harry J. Gaynor	Republican	
Monroe	5th	Walter H. Wickins	Republican	
Montgomery		L. James Shaver*	Republican	
Nassau	1st	Harold P. Herman*	Republican	Chairman of Mortgage and Real Estate
Nassau	2nd	Leonard W. Hall*	Republican	Chairman of Re-Apportionment
New York	1st	James J. Dooling*	Democrat	
New York	2nd	Nicholas A. Rossi*	Democrat	
New York	3rd	Eugene R. Duffy*	Democrat	
New York	4th	Leonard Farbstein*	Democrat	
New York	5th	John F. Killgrew*	Democrat	
New York	6th	Irving D. Neustein*	Democrat	
New York	7th	Saul S. Streit*	Democrat	
New York	8th	Stephen J. Jarema	Democrat	
New York	9th	Ira H. Holley*	Democrat	
New York	10th	Herbert Brownell Jr.*	Rep./City F.	Chairman of Affairs of the City of New York
New York	11th	Patrick H. Sullivan*	Democrat	
New York	12th	John A. Byrnes*	Democrat	
New York	13th	William J. Sheldrick*	Democrat	
New York	14th	Francis J. McCaffrey Jr.*	Democrat	
New York	15th	Abbot Low Moffat*	Republican	Chairman of Ways and Means
New York	16th	William Schwartz*	Democrat	
New York	17th	Meyer Alterman*	Democrat	
New York	18th	Salvatore A. Farenga*	Democrat	
New York	19th	Robert W. Justice	Democrat	
New York	20th	Michael J. Keenan	Democrat	
New York	21st	William T. Andrews*	Democrat	
New York	22nd	Daniel Flynn*	Democrat	
New York	23rd	William J. A. Glancy	Democrat	
Niagara	1st	Fayette E. Pease*	Republican	
Niagara	2nd	Harry D. Suitor*	Republican	
Oneida	1st	Paul B. Mercier	Democrat	
Oneida	2nd	William R. Williams	Republican	
Oneida	3rd	Fred L. Meiss*	Republican	
Onondaga	1st	Horace M. Stone*	Republican	Chairman of Judiciary
Onondaga	2nd	George B. Parsons*	Republican	
Onondaga	3rd	Richard B. Smith*	Republican	Chairman of Affairs of Cities
Ontario		Harry R. Marble*	Republican	
Orange	1st	Lee B. Mailler*	Republican	
Orange	2nd	Rainey S. Taylor*	Republican	Chairman of General Laws
Orleans		John S. Thompson*	Republican	Chairman of Public Service
Oswego		Ernest J. Lonis*	Republican	
Otsego		Frank G. Sherman*	Republican	
Putnam		D. Mallory Stephens*	Republican	Chairman of Banks
Queens	1st	Mario J. Cariello	Democrat	
Queens	2nd	George F. Torsney*	Democrat	
Queens	3rd	Peter T. Farrell*	Democrat	
Queens	4th	Daniel E. Fitzpatrick	Democrat	
Queens	5th	Maurice A. FitzGerald*	Democrat	
Queens	6th	James L. Dixon	Democrat	
Rensselaer	1st	Philip J. Casey	Ind. Dem.	
Rensselaer	2nd	Maurice Whitney*	Rep./Ind. C.	Chairman of Commerce and Navigation
Richmond	1st	Charles Bormann	Democrat	
Richmond	2nd	Herman Methfessel*	Democrat	
Rockland		Laurens M. Hamilton*	Republican	Chairman of Civil Service
St. Lawrence	1st	W. Allan Newell*	Republican	
St. Lawrence	2nd	Warren O. Daniels*	Republican	
Saratoga		William E. Morris*	Republican	
Schenectady	1st	Oswald D. Heck*	Republican	Majority Leader
Schenectady	2nd	Harold Armstrong*	Republican	
Schoharie		William S. Dunn*	Dem./Soc.	
Schuyler		Floyd E. Meeks	Republican	
Seneca		James D. Pollard*	Republican	
Steuben	1st	Wilson Messer*	Republican	
Steuben	2nd	J. Austin Otto*	Republican	
Suffolk	1st	John G. Downs*	Republican	
Suffolk	2nd	Hamilton F. Potter*	Republican	
Sullivan		J. Maxwell Knapp*	Republican	
Tioga		Frank G. Miller*	Republican	Chairman of Public Printing
Tompkins		James R. Robinson*	Republican	Chairman of Codes
Ulster		J. Edward Conway*	Rep./Soc.	
Warren		Harry A. Reoux*	Republican	
Washington		Herbert A. Bartholomew*	Republican	Chairman of Internal Affairs
Wayne		Harry L. Averill*	Republican	Chairman of Public Education
Westchester	1st	Herbert R. Smith*	Republican	
Westchester	2nd	Ralph A. Gamble*	Republican	Chairman of Taxation and Retrenchment
Westchester	3rd	Hugh A. Lavery*	Democrat	
Westchester	4th	Jane H. Todd*	Republican	Chairwoman of Social Welfare
Westchester	5th	William T. Grieve	Republican	
Wyoming		Harold C. Ostertag*	Republican	Chairman of Affairs of Villages
Yates		Fred S. Hollowell*	Republican	Chairman of Excise

=== Employees ===
- Clerk: Ansley B. Borkowski
- Secretary to the Speaker: Truman G. Searle

== Sources ==
- Members of the New York Assembly (1930s) at Political Graveyard
- Members of Legislature—1936 in The State Employee (February 1936, Vol. 5, No. 2, pg. 10, 12 and 15)
- Moffat to Get Ways–Means Post in G.O.P. Harmony Move in the New York Post on January 6, 1936
- Moffat Heads Ways and Means Comm. in the Plattsburgh Daily Press, of Plattsburgh, on January 7, 1936
- Republican Bolters Suffer No Reprisals at Hands of Speaker in The Niagara Falls Gazette, of Niagara Falls, on January 19, 1937
