= 160th New York State Legislature =

New York state legislative session

←	159th	161st	→
- New York State Capitol (2009)

Overview
- Legislative body: New York State Legislature
- Jurisdiction: New York, United States
- Term: January 1 – December 31, 1937

Senate
- Members: 51
- President: Lt. Gov. M. William Bray (D)
- Temporary President: John J. Dunnigan (D)
- Party control: Democratic (29–22)

Assembly
- Members: 150
- Speaker: Oswald D. Heck (R)
- Party control: Republican (76–74)

Sessions
- 1st: January 6 – May 8, 1937

The 160th New York State Legislature, consisting of the New York State Senate and the New York State Assembly, met from January 6 to May 8, 1937, during the fifth year of Herbert H. Lehman's governorship, in Albany.

== Background ==
Under the provisions of the New York Constitution of 1894, re-apportioned in 1917, 51 Senators and 150 assemblymen were elected in single-seat districts; senators for a two-year term, assemblymen for a one-year term. The senatorial districts consisted either of one or more entire counties; or a contiguous area within a single county. The counties which were divided into more than one senatorial district were New York (nine districts), Kings (eight), Bronx (three), Erie (three), Monroe (two), Queens (two) and Westchester (two). The Assembly districts were made up of contiguous area, all within the same county.

At this time there were two major political parties: the Democratic Party and the Republican Party. The Socialist Party and the Communist Party also nominated tickets. The American Labor Party appeared for the first time on the ballot, but only endorsed Gov. Herbert H. Lehman, and made no other nominations on the state ticket.

== Elections ==
The 1936 New York state election was held on November 3. Governor Herbert H. Lehman and Lieutenant Governor M. William Bray were re-elected, both Democrats. The other five statewide elective offices were also carried by the Democrats. The approximate party strength at this election, as expressed by the vote for Governor, was: Democrats 2,708,000; Republicans 2,450,000; American Labor 262,000; Socialists 87,000; and Communists 36,000.

All three women legislators were re-elected: State Senator Rhoda Fox Graves (Rep.), of Gouverneur, a former school teacher who after her marriage became active in women's organisations and politics; and Assemblywomen Doris I. Byrne (Dem.), a lawyer from the Bronx, and Jane H. Todd (Rep.), of Tarrytown.

== Sessions ==
The Legislature met for the regular session at the State Capitol in Albany on January 6, 1937; and adjourned on May 8.

John J. Dunnigan (Dem.) was re-elected Temporary President of the State Senate.

At the opening of the session, eight Republican assemblymen (Barrett, Bartholomew, Conway, Hall, Herman, Lupton, Stephens and Wadsworth) refused to re-elect Speaker Irving M. Ives because of the latter's opposition to Gov. Lehman's relief legislation during the previous session. After a week of deadlock, on January 12, Majority Leader Oswald D. Heck was elected Speaker with 72 votes against 67 for Irwin Steingut (Dem.). Heck then appointed Ives as Majority Leader.

== State Senate ==
=== Districts ===
- 1st District: Nassau and Suffolk counties
- 2nd and 3rd District: Parts of Queens County, i.e. the Borough of Queens
- 4th, 5th, 6th, 7th, 8th, 9th, 10th and 11th District: Parts of Kings County, i.e. the Borough of Brooklyn
- 12th, 13th, 14th, 15th, 16th, 17th, 18th, 19th and 20th District: Parts of New York County, i.e. the Borough of Manhattan
- 21st, 22nd and 23rd District: Parts of Bronx County, i.e. the Borough of the Bronx
- 24th District: Richmond County, i.e. the Borough of Richmond (now the Borough of Staten Island), and Rockland County
- 25th District: Part of Westchester County
- 26th District: Cortlandt, Greenburgh, Mount Pleasant, Ossining and part of Yonkers; in Westchester County
- 27th District: Orange and Sullivan counties
- 28th District: Columbia, Dutchess and Putnam counties
- 29th District: Delaware, Greene and Ulster counties
- 30th District: Albany County
- 31st District: Rensselaer County
- 32nd District: Saratoga and Schenectady counties
- 33rd District: Clinton, Essex, Warren and Washington counties
- 34th District: Franklin and St. Lawrence counties
- 35th District: Fulton, Hamilton, Herkimer and Lewis counties
- 36th District: Oneida County
- 37th District: Jefferson and Oswego counties
- 38th District: Onondaga County
- 39th District: Madison, Montgomery, Otsego and Schoharie counties
- 40th District: Broome, Chenango and Cortland counties
- 41st District: Chemung, Schuyler, Tioga and Tompkins counties
- 42nd District: Cayuga, Seneca and Wayne counties
- 43rd District: Ontario, Steuben and Yates counties
- 44th District: Allegany, Genesee, Livingston and Wyoming
- 45th and 46th District: Monroe County
- 47th District: Niagara and Orleans counties
- 48th, 49th and 50th District: Erie County
- 51st District: Cattaraugus and Chautauqua counties

=== Members ===
The asterisk (*) denotes members of the previous Legislature who continued in office as members of this Legislature. Peter T. Farrell and Erastus Corning 2nd changed from the Assembly to the Senate.

Note: For brevity, the chairmanships omit the words "...the Committee on (the)..."

District	Senator	Party	Notes
1st	George L. Thompson*	Republican	re-elected
2nd	Joseph D. Nunan Jr.*	Democrat	re-elected
3rd	Peter T. Farrell*	Democrat	
4th	Philip M. Kleinfeld*	Democrat	re-elected
5th	John J. Howard*	Democrat	re-elected
6th	Edward J. Coughlin*	Democrat	re-elected
7th	Jacob J. Schwartzwald*	Democrat	re-elected
8th	Joseph A. Esquirol*	Democrat	re-elected
9th	Jacob H. Livingston*	Democrat	re-elected
10th	Jeremiah F. Twomey*	Democrat	re-elected; Chairman of Finance
11th	James J. Crawford*	Democrat	re-elected
12th	Elmer F. Quinn*	Democrat	re-elected
13th	Thomas F. Burchill*	Democrat	re-elected
14th	William J. Murray	Democrat	
15th	John L. Buckley*	Democrat	re-elected
16th	John J. McNaboe*	Democrat	re-elected
17th	Leon A. Fischel	Democrat	
18th	John T. McCall*	Democrat	re-elected
19th	Duncan T. O'Brien*	Democrat	re-elected
20th	A. Spencer Feld*	Democrat	re-elected
21st	Lazarus Joseph*	Democrat	re-elected
22nd	Julius S. Berg*	Democrat	re-elected
23rd	John J. Dunnigan*	Democrat	re-elected; re-elected Temporary President
24th	Rae L. Egbert*	Democrat	re-elected
25th	Pliny W. Williamson*	Republican	re-elected
26th	James A. Garrity*	Dem./Am. L.	re-elected
27th	Thomas C. Desmond*	Republican	re-elected
28th	Frederic H. Bontecou*	Republican	re-elected
29th	Arthur H. Wicks*	Republican	re-elected
30th	Erastus Corning 2nd*	Democrat	
31st	Clifford C. Hastings	Republican	
32nd	Edwin E. Miller*	Republican	re-elected
33rd	Benjamin F. Feinberg*	Republican	re-elected
34th	Rhoda Fox Graves*	Republican	re-elected
35th	Harry F. Dunkel*	Republican	re-elected
36th	William H. Hampton*	Republican	re-elected
37th	Perley A. Pitcher*	Republican	re-elected; Minority Leader
38th	Francis L. McElroy	Dem./Am. L.	
39th	Walter W. Stokes*	Republican	re-elected
40th	Roy M. Page	Republican	
41st	C. Tracey Stagg*	Republican	re-elected
42nd	Charles J. Hewitt*	Republican	re-elected
43rd	Earle S. Warner*	Republican	re-elected
44th	Joe R. Hanley*	Republican	re-elected
45th	Emmett L. Doyle	Dem./Am. L.	
46th	George F. Rogers	Dem./Am. L.	
47th	William H. Lee*	Republican	re-elected
48th	Walter J. Mahoney	Republican	
49th	Stephen J. Wojtkowiak*	Dem./Am. L.	re-elected
50th	Nelson W. Cheney*	Republican	re-elected
51st	Leigh G. Kirkland*	Republican	re-elected

=== Employees ===
- Clerk: James J. Reilly
- Sergeant-at-Arms: William F. Egloff Jr.
- Stenographer: Robert Murray

== State Assembly ==
=== Assemblymen ===
Note: For brevity, the chairmanships omit the words "...the Committee on (the)..."

District		Assemblymen	Party	Notes
Albany	1st	George W. Foy	Democrat	
Albany	2nd	John P. Hayes*	Democrat	
Albany	3rd	John McBain	Rep./Union	
Allegany		William H. MacKenzie*	Republican	
Bronx	1st	Matthew J. H. McLaughlin*	Democrat	
Bronx	2nd	Doris I. Byrne*	Democrat	resigned on May 8 and appointed Deputy Secretary of State
Bronx	3rd	Carl Pack*	Democrat	
Bronx	4th	Isidore Dollinger	Democrat	
Bronx	5th	Julius J. Gans*	Democrat	
Bronx	6th	Peter A. Quinn*	Democrat	
Bronx	7th	Bernard R. Fleisher*	Democrat	
Bronx	8th	John A. Devany Jr.*	Democrat	
Broome	1st	Edward F. Vincent*	Republican	Chairman of Public Institutions
Broome	2nd	James E. Hill*	Republican	
Cattaraugus		James W. Riley*	Republican	Chairman of Military Affairs
Cayuga		Andrew D. Burgdorf*	Republican	Chairman of Penal Institutions
Chautauqua	1st	Lloyd J. Babcock*	Republican	Chairman of Pensions
Chautauqua	2nd	Carl E. Darling*	Republican	
Chemung		Chauncey B. Hammond*	Republican	
Chenango		Irving M. Ives*	Republican	Majority Leader
Clinton		Emmett J. Roach	Democrat	
Columbia		Frederick A. Washburn*	Republican	Chairman of Labor and Industries
Cortland		John B. Briggs	Republican	
Delaware		E. Ogden Bush*	Republican	Chairman of Public Health
Dutchess	1st	Howard N. Allen*	Republican	Chairman of Agriculture
Dutchess	2nd	Emerson D. Fite*	Republican	
Erie	1st	Frank A. Gugino*	Republican	
Erie	2nd	Harold B. Ehrlich*	Republican	Chairman of Claims
Erie	3rd	Fred Hammer	Democrat	
Erie	4th	Anthony J. Canney*	Democrat	
Erie	5th	Edwin L. Kantowski*	Democrat	
Erie	6th	Jerome C. Kreinheder	Republican	
Erie	7th	Charles O. Burney Jr.	Republican	
Erie	8th	R. Foster Piper*	Republican	Chairman of Insurance
Essex		Thomas A. Leahy*	Republican	
Franklin		John H. Black*	Republican	
Fulton and Hamilton		Denton D. Lake*	Republican	
Genesee		Herbert A. Rapp*	Republican	Chairman of Motor Vehicles
Greene		Paul Fromer*	Republican	
Herkimer		Leo A. Lawrence	Republican	
Jefferson		Russell Wright*	Republican	
Kings	1st	Crawford W. Hawkins*	Democrat	
Kings	2nd	Albert D. Schanzer*	Democrat	
Kings	3rd	Michael J. Gillen*	Democrat	
Kings	4th	Bernard Austin*	Democrat	
Kings	5th	Charles R. McConnell*	Democrat	
Kings	6th	Jule L. Maisel	Democrat	
Kings	7th	William Kirnan*	Democrat	
Kings	8th	James V. Mangano*	Democrat	
Kings	9th	Edgar F. Moran*	Democrat	
Kings	10th	William C. McCreery*	Democrat	
Kings	11th	Bernard J. Moran*	Democrat	
Kings	12th	Edward S. Moran Jr.*	Democrat	
Kings	13th	Ralph Schwartz*	Democrat	
Kings	14th	Rudolph Zimmerman	Democrat	
Kings	15th	Edward P. Doyle*	Democrat	
Kings	16th	Carmine J. Marasco*	Democrat	
Kings	17th	George W. Stewart*	Democrat	
Kings	18th	Irwin Steingut*	Democrat	Minority Leader
Kings	19th	Max M. Turshen	Democrat	
Kings	20th	Roy H. Rudd	Democrat	
Kings	21st	Charles H. Breitbart*	Democrat	
Kings	22nd	Clement A. Shelton*	Democrat	
Kings	23rd	G. Thomas LoRe*	Democrat	
Lewis		Fred A. Young*	Republican	
Livingston		James J. Wadsworth*	Republican	Chairman of Public Relief and Welfare
Madison		Wheeler Milmoe*	Republican	
Monroe	1st	Pritchard H. Strong	Republican	Chairman of Aviation
Monroe	2nd	Stephen S. Joy	Democrat	
Monroe	3rd	Earl C. Langenbacher*	Democrat	
Monroe	4th	Myer Braiman	Democrat	
Monroe	5th	Walter H. Wickins*	Republican	
Montgomery		L. James Shaver*	Republican	Chairman of Canals
Nassau	1st	Harold P. Herman*	Republican	Chairman of Mortgage and Real Estate
Nassau	2nd	Leonard W. Hall*	Republican	Chairman of Re-Apportionment
New York	1st	James J. Dooling*	Democrat	
New York	2nd	Nicholas A. Rossi*	Democrat	
New York	3rd	Phelps Phelps	Democrat	
New York	4th	Leonard Farbstein*	Democrat	
New York	5th	John F. Killgrew*	Democrat	
New York	6th	Irving D. Neustein*	Democrat	
New York	7th	Irwin D. Davidson	Democrat	
New York	8th	Stephen J. Jarema*	Democrat	
New York	9th	Ira H. Holley*	Democrat	
New York	10th	Herbert Brownell Jr.*	Republican	Chairman of Affairs of the City of New York
New York	11th	Patrick H. Sullivan*	Democrat	
New York	12th	Edmund J. Delany	Democrat	
New York	13th	William J. Sheldrick*	Democrat	
New York	14th	Francis J. McCaffrey Jr.*	Democrat	
New York	15th	Abbot Low Moffat*	Republican	Chairman of Ways and Means
New York	16th	William Schwartz*	Democrat	
New York	17th	Meyer Alterman*	Democrat	
New York	18th	Salvatore A. Farenga*	Democrat	
New York	19th	Robert W. Justice*	Democrat	
New York	20th	Michael J. Keenan*	Democrat	
New York	21st	William T. Andrews*	Democrat	
New York	22nd	Daniel Flynn*	Democrat	
New York	23rd	William J. A. Glancy*	Democrat	
Niagara	1st	Fayette E. Pease*	Republican	Chairman of Conservation
Niagara	2nd	Harry D. Suitor*	Republican	Chairman of Codes
Oneida	1st	Paul B. Mercier*	Democrat	
Oneida	2nd	William R. Williams*	Republican	
Oneida	3rd	Fred L. Meiss*	Republican	
Onondaga	1st	Leo W. Breed	Republican	
Onondaga	2nd	George B. Parsons*	Republican	
Onondaga	3rd	Richard B. Smith*	Republican	Chairman of Affairs of Cities; died on February 26, 1937
Onondaga	3rd	Frank J. Costello	Republican	elected on April 1, to fill vacancy
Ontario		Harry R. Marble*	Republican	
Orange	1st	Lee B. Mailler*	Republican	
Orange	2nd	Rainey S. Taylor*	Republican	Chairman of General Laws
Orleans		John S. Thompson*	Republican	Chairman of Public Service
Oswego		Ernest J. Lonis*	Republican	
Otsego		Chester T. Backus	Republican	
Putnam		D. Mallory Stephens*	Republican	Chairman of Banks
Queens	1st	Mario J. Cariello*	Democrat	
Queens	2nd	George F. Torsney*	Democrat	
Queens	3rd	John V. Downey	Democrat	
Queens	4th	Daniel E. Fitzpatrick*	Democrat	
Queens	5th	Maurice A. FitzGerald*	Democrat	on November 2, 1937, elected Sheriff of Queens Co.
Queens	6th	Austin B. Mandel	Democrat	
Rensselaer	1st	Philip J. Casey*	Democrat	
Rensselaer	2nd	Maurice Whitney*	Republican	Chairman of Commerce and Navigation
Richmond	1st	Charles Bormann*	Democrat	
Richmond	2nd	Herman Methfessel*	Democrat	
Rockland		Laurens M. Hamilton*	Republican	Chairman of Civil Service
St. Lawrence	1st	W. Allan Newell*	Republican	
St. Lawrence	2nd	Warren O. Daniels*	Republican	
Saratoga		William E. Morris*	Republican	Chairman of Revision
Schenectady	1st	Oswald D. Heck*	Republican	elected Speaker; Chairman of Rules
Schenectady	2nd	Harold Armstrong*	Republican	Chairman of Charitable and Religious Societies
Schoharie		Arthur L. Parsons	Republican	
Schuyler		Dutton Peterson	Republican	
Seneca		Lawrence W. Van Cleef	Republican	
Steuben	1st	Guy W. Cheney	Republican	
Steuben	2nd	William M. Stuart	Republican	
Suffolk	1st	Edmund R. Lupton	Republican	
Suffolk	2nd	Elisha T. Barrett	Republican	
Sullivan		Otto Hillig	Democrat	
Tioga		Frank G. Miller*	Republican	Chairman of Public Printing
Tompkins		Stanley C. Shaw	Republican	
Ulster		J. Edward Conway*	Republican	
Warren		Harry A. Reoux*	Republican	Chairman of Judiciary
Washington		Herbert A. Bartholomew*	Republican	Chairman of Internal Affairs
Wayne		Harry L. Averill*	Republican	Chairman of Public Education
Westchester	1st	Herbert R. Smith*	Republican	Chairman of Printed and Engrossed Bills
Westchester	2nd	Ralph A. Gamble*	Republican	Chairman of Taxation and Retrenchment; on November 2, 1937, elected to the 75th U.S. Congress
Westchester	3rd	Hugh A. Lavery*	Democrat	
Westchester	4th	Jane H. Todd*	Republican	Chairwoman of Social Welfare
Westchester	5th	Arthur J. Doran	Democrat	
Wyoming		Harold C. Ostertag*	Republican	Chairman of Affairs of Villages
Yates		Fred S. Hollowell*	Republican	Chairman of Excise

=== Employees ===
- Clerk: Ansley B. Borkowski

== Sources ==
- Members of Legislature—1937 in The State Employee (January 1937, Vol. 6, No. 1, pg. 11, 12 and 15)
- Members of the New York Senate (1930s) at Political Graveyard
- Members of the New York Assembly (1930s) at Political Graveyard
- Republican Bolters Suffer No Reprisals at Hands of Speaker in The Niagara Falls Gazette, of Niagara Falls, on January 19, 1937
