= Harry A. Reoux =

American politician

Harry A. Reoux (January 29, 1901 – March 2, 1968) was an American lawyer and politician from New York.

== Life ==
He was born on January 29, 1901, in Warrensburg, Warren County, New York, the son of Louis E. Reoux (died 1938) and Adelia H. (Thomas) Reoux (1873–1958).

Reoux was a member of the New York State Assembly (Warren Co.) in 1931, 1932, 1933, 1934, 1935, 1936, 1937, 1938, 1939–40, 1941–42, 1943–44, 1945–46, 1947–48 and 1949–50. He was Chairman of the Committee on the Judiciary from 1937 to 1950. He was also Chairman of the Special Joint Legislative Committee on Re-Apportionment from 1949 to 1950. He resigned his assembly seat in June 1950, and was appointed in July as Legal Counsel to the latter committee, while State Senator Pliny W. Williamson succeeded Reoux as chairman. Reoux was dismissed from the post in February 1952.

On December 31, 1959, he was fined almost $100,000 for contempt of court.

He died on March 2, 1968, at his home in Warrensburg, New York.

New York State Assembly
Preceded by Paul L. Boyce	New York State Assembly; Warren County; 1931–1950	Succeeded by Stuart F. Hawley
Preceded by Horace M. Stone	New York State Assembly; Chairman of the Committee on the Judiciary; 1937–1950	Succeeded by Justin C. Morgan
