= Senator McCall =

Senator McCall may refer to:

- H. Carl McCall (born 1935), New York State Senate
- James McCall (politician) (1774–1856), New York State Senate
- John T. McCall (1863–1950), New York State Senate
