= James A. Garrity =

American politician (1878–1944)

Member of the New York Senate from the 26th district
- In office January 1, 1935 – December 31, 1938
- Preceded by: Seabury C. Mastick
- Succeeded by: William F. Condon

Personal details
- Born: October 18, 1878 Port Griffith, Pennsylvania, U.S.
- Died: June 9, 1944 (aged 65) Yonkers, New York, U.S.
- Party: Democratic
- Profession: Politician

James A. Garrity (October 18, 1878 – June 9, 1944) was an American politician from New York.

== Life ==
He was born on October 18, 1878, in Port Griffith, Pennsylvania. He attended the public schools, and began to work in the local anthracite mines when eleven years old.

In 1902, he moved to Yonkers, New York, and was Chief Probation Officer of the Yonkers City Court from 1902 to 1917. Later he engaged in the insurance business and, in March 1932, he was elected President of the Yonkers Chamber of Commerce.

Garrity was a member of the New York State Senate (26th D.) from 1935 to 1938, sitting in the 158th, 159th, 160th and 161st New York State Legislatures.

He died on June 9, 1944, in Yonkers, New York.

== Sources ==
New York State Senate
Preceded by Seabury C. Mastick	New York State Senate; 26th District; 1935–1938	Succeeded by William F. Condon
