= Irving D. Neustein =

American lawyer and politician

Irving Daniel Neustein (November 30, 1901 – December 7, 1979) was a Jewish-American lawyer and politician from New York City.

== Life ==
Neustein was born on November 30, 1901, in New York City, New York, the son of Charles Neustein and Mary Katz. He graduated from the New York Law School with an LL.B. in 1923

Neustein began working as a lawyer in 1924 and had law offices at 277 Broadway. He became a member of the Jefferson Club, the Democratic organization for the Manhattan 6th Assembly District, in about 1928. In 1929, he managed Thomas C. T. Crain's campaign for Manhattan District Attorney in the Lower East Side, from the Battery to 14th Street. In 1930, he was elected to the New York State Assembly as a Democrat, representing the New York County 6th District. He served in the Assembly in 1931, 1932, 1933, 1934, 1935 (by which point his law office was at 270 Broadway, 1936, and 1937.

In the 1935 Assembly session, Neustein wrote and passed the Anti-Injunction Bill (which restricted injunctions against labor unions and guaranteed jury trials for injunction violators), the Industrial Homework Bill (which placed work done at home under the supervision of the U.S. Department of Labor), and the Mandelbaum-Neustein Toilet Bill. He lost the 1937 re-election to Republican candidate Meyer Goldberg. In March 1938, Governor Herbert H. Lehman appointed him a member of the New York State Appeal Board of Unemployment Insurance. In 1941, when his political activities were being investigated by the U.S. Civil Service Commission for violating the Hatch Act, he resigned from the Board. He was ordered ousted from there two years later, even though he was no longer part of the Board. By 1950, he was living in Long Beach.

Neustein attended the Wall St. Hungarian Synagogue. He was a director of the Hebrew Day Nursery, and the Jefferson Democratic Club as well as a member of Talmud Torah Ohel Torah, the New York County Democratic Committee, the Freemasons, and the Anawanda Democratic Club. In 1933, he married Estelle Galanty. Their children were Charles B. and Mary E.

Neustein died at the Jewish Home for the Aged in Manhattan on December 7, 1979.

New York State Assembly
Preceded by Louis J. Lefkowitz	New York State Assembly; New York County, 6th District; 1931–1937	Succeeded by Meyer Goldberg
