= Wilson Messer =

American politician

- Born: August 23, 1876; Campbell, New York, United States
- Died: September 9, 1958 (aged 82); Corning, New York, United States
- Occupations: Farmer; businessman; politician
- Known for: Member of the New York State Assembly
- Political party: Republican
- Spouse: Maude B. Woodcock
- Children: 1

Wilson Messer (August 23, 1876 – September 9, 1958) was an American farmer, businessman, and politician from New York.

== Life ==
Messer was born on August 23, 1876, in Campbell, New York, the son of Thomas Messer and Martha White.

Messer attended the Painted Post High School in Campbell, after which he studied civil engineering for two years. Until 1920, he largely worked as a farmer on land his family owned for a century. He spent six years teaching in school and two years doing ranch work and prospecting on the Pacific Coast. He then moved to Corning and worked in the automobile business for five years. After that, he entered the real estate business.

Messer was a general clerk in the New York State Assembly in 1917, a committee clerk in 1918, and a deputy clerk in 1919, and 1920. In 1923, he was elected to the Assembly as a Republican, representing the Steuben County 1st District. He served in the Assembly in 1924, 1925, 1926, 1927, 1928, 1929, 1930, 1931, 1932, 1933, 1934, 1935, and 1936.

Messer was a member of the State Aviation Commission since it was first organized. He was on the Republican County Committee for 25 years. He was a member of the Elks, the Freemasons, and the Rotary Club. He attended the First Baptist Church of Corning. In 1920, he married Maude B. Woodcock of Campbell. They had a daughter, Majorie.

Messer died in Corning Hospital on September 9, 1958. He was buried in Coopers Plains Cemetery.

New York State Assembly
Preceded by Edwin J. Carpenter	New York State Assembly; Steuben County, 1st District; 1924–1936	Succeeded by Guy W. Cheney
