= William T. Andrews =

American politician

William T. Andrews (1898–1984) was an American lawyer and Democratic politician from New York.

== Life ==
He was born in Sumter, South Carolina, in 1898. Andrews married Regina M. Anderson on April 10, 1926. He was a Special Legal Assistant for the NAACP and was responsible for investigating allegations of Jim Crow discrimination in Hillburn, NY in the 1930s.

He was a member of the New York State Assembly in 1935, 1936, 1937, 1938, 1939–40, 1941–42, 1943–44, 1945–46 and 1947–48.

He died in 1984;

== Sources ==
New York State Assembly
Preceded by Robert Bernstein	New York State Assembly; New York County, 21st District; 1935–1944	Succeeded by district abolished
Preceded by Francis X. McGowan	New York State Assembly; New York County, 12th District; 1945–1948	Succeeded by Elijah L. Crump
