= E. Ogden Bush =

American politician

Elmer Ogden Bush (September 14, 1898 – May 26, 1987) was an American dentist and politician from New York.

== Life ==
Bush was born in 1898 on a farm in Delancey, Delaware County, New York, the son of Clarence A. Bush (died 1909) and Anna Bostwick Bush. He attended Delaware Academy in Delhi, and graduated in dentistry from the University of Buffalo in 1919. He practiced in Walton from 1921 to 1966. In May 1925, he married Ella Vitt, and they had four children.

He was a member of the New York State Assembly (Delaware Co.) in 1933, 1934, 1935, 1936 and 1937.

Bush was an alternate delegate to the 1940 Republican National Convention, and a delegate to the 1944, 1948 and 1952 Republican National Conventions. In the 1952 primary his election over Hamilton Fish III was seen as a vote for Dwight D. Eisenhower over Robert A. Taft, although Bush was not in any way actually obligated to vote for Eisenhower.

He was Chairman of the Delaware County Republican Committee from 1947 to 1959; and a member of the New York State Senate (34th D.) from 1957 to 1965, sitting in the 171st, 172nd, 173rd, 174th and 175th New York State Legislatures.

Bush was a longtime member of the Council of Delhi Technological University, and was Chairman of the Council from 1948 to 1968.

Bush died in May 1987. In 1993, New York State Route 206 in Delaware County, New York from Downsville to the Sullivan County, New York line was renamed the E. Ogden Bush Memorial Highway. Bush had been instrumental in the road's reconstruction.

== General Reference ==
- E. Ogden Bush Papers, 1884,1958-1965. M.E. Grenander Department of Special Collections and Archives, University Libraries, University at Albany, State University of New York (hereafter referred to as the Bush Papers).

New York State Assembly
| Preceded by James R. Stevenson | New York State Assembly; Delaware County; 1933–1937 | Succeeded by William T. A. Webb |
New York State Senate
| Preceded by Arthur H. Wicks | New York State Senate; 34th District; 1957–1965 | Succeeded by Harrison J. Goldin |
