= John A. Byrnes =

American lawyer, politician, and judge

John A. Byrnes (c. 1897 – July 24, 1963) was an American lawyer, politician, and judge from New York City.

== Life ==
Byrnes was born in around 1897 in New York City, New York.

Byrnes attended the parochial schools, Cathedral high school and college. He received an A.B. degree in 1918. He then went to Fordham University School of Law and received an LL.B. degree from there in 1923. He was admitted to the bar in 1924, and by 1926 he practiced law and had a law office at 261 Broadway. In 1925, he was elected to the New York State Assembly as a Democrat, representing the New York County 12th District. He served in the Assembly in 1926, 1927, 1928, 1929, 1930, 1931, 1932, 1933, 1934, 1935, and 1936.

While in the Assembly, Byrnes accused some of Governor Herbert H. Lehman's anti-crime bills as "crackpot" legislation and a "hodge-podge of ill-advised measures." Lehman then singled him out in a message to the Legislature on better law enforcement, calling him a reactionary and an opponent of wholesale changes in criminal court proceedings. In 1936, Tammany Hall nominated him to succeed the retiring Justice Edward B. La Fetra to the City Court. He was elected to the City Court that November, was sworn into office that December by Surrogate James A. Foley, and was inducted into office in January 1937.

In 1943, the 22 City Court Justices unanimously Byrnes Chief Justice of the City Court, which at 46 made him the youngest person to hold that position until then. He was re-elected to the City Court in 1946. In 1956, a New York City Bar Association committee launched an inquiry into Byrnes' qualifications, and then asked the New York Supreme Court, Appellate Division to investigate charges of nepotism and widespread absenteeism. He admitted to having a personal relationship with three members of his staff, including a son, a sister, and his wife's cousin, although he denied the absenteeism. He was re-elected to the City Court unopposed in the November election that year, but in March 1957 he didn't run for re-election as Chief Justice of the City Court and was succeeded to that position by Justice Peter A. Quinn. He resigned as Justice of the City Court in 1959 and was succeeded as Justice by Harry Harris.

Byrnes died at St. Vincent's Hospital on July 24, 1963. He was survived by his wife Mae and his sons James, John, and William.

New York State Assembly
| Preceded by Paul T. Kammerer Jr. | New York State Assembly; New York County, 12th District; 1926–1936 | Succeeded by Edmund J. Delany |
