= Carl Pack =

American politician

Member of the New York State Senate from the 25nd district
- In office 1945–1945

Member of the New York State Senate from the 22nd district
- In office 1939–1944

Member of the New York State Assembly for Bronx County, 3rd District
- In office 1931–1938

Personal details
- Born: January 25, 1899 Worcester, Massachusetts, U.S.
- Died: August 7, 1945 (aged 46) New York City, U.S.
- Education: Brooklyn Law School
- Occupation: Lawyer and politician

Carl Pack (January 25, 1899 – August 7, 1945) was an American lawyer and politician from New York.

== Life ==
He was born on January 25, 1899, in Worcester, Massachusetts. He graduated LL.B. from Brooklyn Law School in 1920, was admitted to the bar in 1921, and graduated LL.M. from Brooklyn Law School in 1922.

Pack was a member of the New York State Assembly (Bronx Co., 3rd D.) in 1931, 1932, 1933, 1934, 1935, 1936, 1937 and 1938.

He was a member of the New York State Senate from 1939 until his death in 1945, sitting in the 162nd, 163rd, 164th and 165th New York State Legislatures.

He died on August 7, 1945, in New York City.

== Sources ==
New York State Assembly
Preceded by Julius S. Berg	New York State Assembly; Bronx County, 3rd District; 1931–1938	Succeeded by Arthur Wachtel
New York State Senate
Preceded by Julius S. Berg	New York State Senate; 22nd District; 1939–1944	Succeeded by Richard A. DiCostanzo
Preceded by Pliny W. Williamson	New York State Senate; 25th District; 1945	Succeeded by Arthur Wachtel
