= Edward F. Vincent =

American farmer and politician (1881–1940)

Member of the New York State Assembly from the Broome County district
- In office 1934–1940
- Preceded by: Albert L. Brown
- Succeeded by: Floyd E. Anderson

Personal details
- Born: Edward Fuller Vincent; December 30, 1881 Washington, D.C., U.S.
- Died: October 26, 1940 (aged 58)
- Resting place: Floral Park Cemetery; Johnson City, New York, U.S.
- Party: Republican
- Spouse: Lydia C. Corbin (m. 1907)
- Children: 1
- Parent: Edgar L. Vincent (father)
- Occupation: Politician; farmer

Edward Fuller Vincent (December 30, 1881 – October 26, 1940) was an American farmer and politician from New York.

== Life ==
He was born on December 30, 1881, in Washington, D.C., the son of Edgar LaVerne Vincent (1851–1936) and Jennie (Fuller) Vincent (1851–1933). In 1907, he married Lydia C. Corbin, and they had one son. They lived in Maine, Broome County, New York.

Vincent was a member of the New York State Assembly (Broome Co., 1st D.) in 1934, 1935, 1936, 1937, 1938 and 1939–40; and was chairman of the Committee on Public Institutions from 1937 to 1940.

He died on October 26, 1940, after an illness of several months; and was buried at the Floral Park Cemetery in Johnson City.

== Sources ==
New York State Assembly
Preceded by Albert L. Brown	New York State Assembly; Broome County; 1934–1940	Succeeded by Floyd E. Anderson
