= William C. McCreery =

American politician

William Cornelius McCreery (December 22, 1896 – November 20, 1988) was an American lawyer and politician from New York.

== Life ==
McCreery was born on December 22, 1896, in Brooklyn, New York.

After finishing public school, McCreery attended Poly Prep. He graduated from there in 1916, after which he went to Fordham University School of Law. He graduated from there in 1919, and in 1920 he was admitted to the bar. He practiced law in Brooklyn, with law offices in 375 Fulton Street by 1926. His law office moved to 16 Court Street by 1935, at which point he resided at 159 Prospect Place.

In 1925, McCreery was elected to the New York State Assembly as a Democrat, representing the Kings County 10th District. He served in the Assembly in 1926, 1927, 1928, 1929, 1930, 1931, 1932, 1933, 1934, 1935, 1936, 1937, 1938, and the 162nd State Legislature. He lost the 1940 re-election to Republican Francis E. Dorn. Shortly after his first election, he helped stop an attack on Governor Al Smith. In the Assembly, he was active in reforming the court system and was chairman of Judiciary Committee in 1935. He also sponsored legislation that banned child labor and expanded education aid. After leaving the Assembly, he resumed practicing trust and estate law in Brooklyn.

McCreery was a member of the Montauk Club, the Knights of Columbus, the Washington Club, and other civic associations in Brooklyn. He married his first wife, Consuela Gestelle, in 1929. She died in childbirth in 1932. In 1939, he married Florence Katherine O'Malley. His children were Cornelia, Virginia, William G., and Charles.

McCreery died at home from heart failure on November 20, 1988.

New York State Assembly
Preceded by Bernard F. Gray	New York State Assembly; Kings County, 10th District; 1926–1940	Succeeded by Francis E. Dorn
