= Francis J. McCaffrey Jr. =

American lawyer and politician

Francis J. McCaffrey (September 9, 1902 – May 29, 1972) was an American lawyer and politician from New York.

== Life ==
He was born on September 9, 1902, in Manhattan, the son of veterinarian Dr. Francis J. McCaffrey (died 1939) and Irene (Booth) McCaffrey. In 1932, he married Katherine Agnes Hume, and they had several children. He entered politics as a Democrat.

McCaffrey Jr. was a member of the New York State Assembly (New York Co., 14th D.) in 1934, 1935, 1936, 1937, 1938 and 1939–40.

He was a member of the New York State Senate (16th D.) in 1941. In November 1941, he was elected to the New York City Municipal Court.

He was a justice of the Municipal Court from 1942 to 1956; of the Domestic Relations Court from 1956 to 1962; and of the Family Court from 1962 to July 1971.

He died on May 29, 1972, in New York Hospital in Manhattan.

== Sources ==
New York State Assembly
Preceded by Edward V. Loughlin	New York State Assembly; New York County, 14th District; 1934–1940	Succeeded by Warren J. McCarron
New York State Senate
Preceded by John J. McNaboe	New York State Senate; 16th District; 1941	Succeeded by Thomas G. Brennan
