= Julius S. Berg =

American lawyer and politician (1893–1938)

- Born: July 12, 1893; Manhattan, New York, U.S.
- Died: July 20, 1938 (aged 45)
- Education: New York University
- Occupations: Lawyer and Politician

Julius S. Berg (July 12, 1893 – July 20, 1938) was an American lawyer and politician from New York.

== Life ==
He was born on July 12, 1893, in Manhattan, New York City, the son of Morris Berg and Celia (Weinstein) Berg. He attended the public schools, and for one year New York University. He practiced law in New York City. On June 20, 1920, he married Rose Schram.

Berg was a member of the New York State Assembly (Bronx Co., 3rd D.) in 1923, 1924, 1925, 1926, 1927, 1928, 1929 and 1930. He was Commander-in-Chief of the Jewish War Veterans of the United States of America from 1928 to 1930.

He was a member of the New York State Senate (22nd D.) from 1931 until his death in 1938, sitting in the 154th, 155th, 156th, 157th, 158th, 159th, 160th and 161st New York State Legislatures.

On July 20, 1938, he died by suicide by shooting himself in his office at 1650 Broadway in Manhattan while a grand jury was going to hand down an indictment on 17 counts of grand larceny and embezzlement. His wife claimed that Berg shot himself because of ill health.

== Sources ==
New York State Assembly
Preceded by Benjamin Antin	New York State Assembly; Bronx County, 3rd District; 1923–1930	Succeeded by Carl Pack
New York State Senate
Preceded by Benjamin Antin	New York State Senate; 22nd District; 1931–1938	Succeeded by Carl Pack
