= George F. Torsney =

American businessman and politician

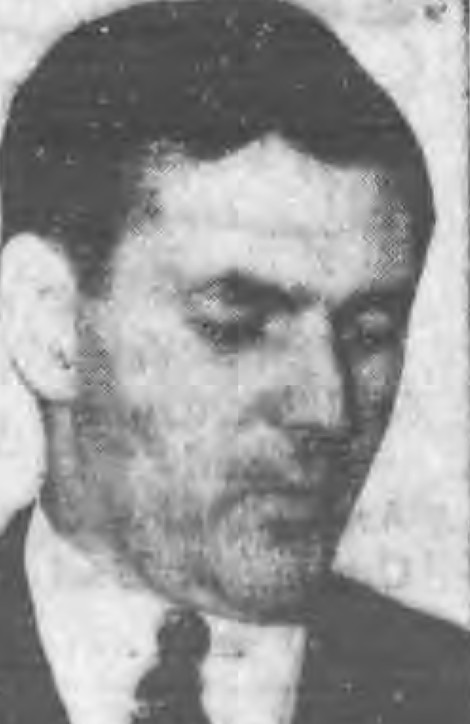
- Torsney in 1941

Member of the New York State Assembly

Personal details
- Born: December 27, 1896
- Died: December 28, 1942 (aged 46) New York City
- Party: Democratic

George F. Torsney (December 27, 1896 – December 28, 1942) was an American businessman and politician from New York.

== Life ==
He was born on December 27, 1896, in New York City. He attended Public Schools No. 84 and 58, and New York Evening High School. During World War I he served as a first sergeant in the United States Marine Corps. After the war he engaged in the trucking and warehousing business. On September 19, 1923, he married Katharine F. Doyle (died 1938), and they had five children. In 1926, the family moved to Long Island City.

Torsney was a member of the New York State Assembly (Queens Co., 2nd D.) in 1933, 1934, 1935, 1936 and 1937.

Torsney was again a member of the State Assembly from 1939 to 1942, sitting in the 162nd and 163rd New York State Legislatures. He was re-elected in November 1942, but died a few days before the next Legislature met.

He died on December 28, 1942, in his office at 601 West 28th Street in Manhattan; and was buried at the Calvary Cemetery in Queens.

Torsney Playground, located on the corner of Skillman Ave. and 43rd Street in Queens, was named in his honor.

== Sources ==
New York State Assembly
| Preceded by Joseph C. Mulligan | New York State Assembly; Queens County, 2nd District; 1933–1937 | Succeeded by Timothy P. Kirwan |
| Preceded by Timothy P. Kirwan | New York State Assembly; Queens County, 2nd District; 1939–1942 | Succeeded by William E. Clancy |
