= Edward S. Moran Jr. =

American politician (1900–1996)

Edward S. Moran (November 19, 1900 – January 17, 1996) was an American lawyer and politician from New York.

== Life ==
He was born on November 19, 1900, in Brooklyn, New York City, the son of Edward S. Moran (died 1935).

Moran was a member of the New York State Assembly (Kings Co., 12th D.) in 1927, 1928, 1929, 1930, 1931, 1932, 1933, 1934, 1935, 1936, 1937 and 1938. He was Chairman of the Committee on Insurance in 1935.

On June 24, 1938, he was arrested and accused of accepting $36,000 in bribes to influence legislation concerning taxicab companies. On April 10, 1939, he was again arrested, and this time charged with tax evasion. On June 9, 1939, he was convicted of bribery. On July 5, 1939, he was sentenced to two and a half to five years in prison. On May 3, 1940, he was disbarred by the Appellate Division. On November 13, 1940, the New York Court of Appeals upheld the conviction. On January 13, 1941, Moran was taken to Sing Sing prison, and began serving his sentence. On September 21, 1942, he was released on parole.

He died on January 17, 1996.

== Sources ==
New York State Assembly
Preceded by Marcellus H. Evans	New York State Assembly; Kings County, 12th District; 1927–1938	Succeeded by James W. Feely
