= Joseph D. Nunan Jr. =

American politician (1897–1968)

Joseph Daly Nunan Jr. (December 28, 1897 – February 21, 1968) was an American politician from New York.

== Life ==
He was born on December 28, 1897, in Brooklyn.

He was a member of the New York State Assembly (Queens Co., 4th D.) in 1930.

He was a member of the New York State Senate (2nd D.) from 1931 to 1940, sitting in the 154th, 155th, 156th, 157th, 158th, 159th, 160th, 161st and 162nd New York State Legislatures. He was a delegate to the New York State Constitutional Convention of 1938.

He was U.S. Collector of Internal Revenue for the 1st New York District from March 1, 1944 until June 30, 1947. At that time, he was hired by Lawrence Bardin, President of the Indianapolis Brewing Co. and turned an IRS debt of $636,000 into a $35,000 refund. Lawrence Bardin was subsequently convicted of income tax evasion and served ten months in prison.

He was convicted of tax evasion in 1952. He was convicted of hiding more than $90,000 income. In particular, he had won $1,800 on a bet that Harry Truman would win the election, but he neglected to declare it on his taxes.

He died in February 1968.

== Notes ==
- "Joseph D. Nunan Jr." at the Political Graveyard

New York State Assembly
Preceded by Robert J. Hunt	New York State Assembly; Queens County, 4th District; 1930	Succeeded by James A. Burke
New York State Senate
Preceded by Stephen F. Burkard	New York State Senate; 2nd District; 1931–1940	Succeeded by Seymour Halpern
