= A. Spencer Feld =

American politician

Aaron Spencer Feld (January 5, 1891 – March 24, 1987) was an American lawyer and politician from New York.

== Life ==
He was born on January 5, 1891, in New York City.

Feld was a member of the New York State Assembly (New York Co., 23rd D.) in 1925 and 1926.

He was a member of the New York State Senate (20th D.) from 1927 to 1940, sitting in the 150th, 151st, 152nd, 153rd, 154th, 155th, 156th, 157th, 158th, 159th, 160th, 161st and 162nd New York State Legislatures. He was Chairman of the Senate Committee on Public Education from 1933 to 1938; and in 1934 succeeded J. Griswold Webb as Chairman of the Special Joint Legislative Committee on Aviation.

In 1942, Feld was disbarred by the New York Supreme Court, Appellate Division.

He died on March 24, 1987; and was buried at the Los Angeles National Cemetery.

New York State Assembly
Preceded by Nelson Ruttenberg	New York State Assembly; New York County, 23rd District; 1925–1926	Succeeded by Alexander A. Falk
New York State Senate
Preceded by Michael E. Reiburn	New York State Senate; 20th District; 1927–1940	Succeeded by Alexander A. Falk
