= Edwin E. Miller =

American politician (1884–1949)

Edwin Evan Miller (1883/1884 – June 7, 1949) was an American lawyer, academic, and politician. He was a member of the New York State Senate for two terms.

== Early life ==
Miller was born in 1883 or 1884 in Fond du Lac, Wisconsin. His parents were Selesa B. (née Unger) and Franklin S. Miller. He was descended from pioneer families of Berks County, Pennsylvania. Miller was reared in a log cabin near Shartlesville in Berks County until the family moved into the suburbs of Reading, Pennsylvania. In his youth, Miller was an early wage earner, beginning as a newsboy in Reading at the age of nine. For the next thirteen years, he was employed in other and various ways, earning money with which he paid his way through college and law school.

Miller graduated from the Keystone State Normal School at Kutztown with a Bachelor of Engineering in 1897. He received a Master's in mechanical engineering from that institution in 1899. He graduated from Oberlin College with a Bachelor of Arts in 1906. At Oberlin, he was a member of the debating team for two years and a member of Phi Beta Kappa.

He received a Bachelor of Laws degree from Franklin T. Backus Law School of Western Reserve University in 1909.

== Career ==
In 1909, Miller was admitted to the bar of Ohio and entered the practice of law in Cleveland. From August 1909 until May 1918, Miller served as a deputy clerk in the Probate Court of Cuyahoga County. For three years, he was an instructor of personal property, wills, domestic relations, and partnerships in what was then the Rufus P. Janney Law School. Starting in 1918, he was an instructor in wills and evidence at the John Marshall Law School of Cleveland.

Miller practiced law with the firm of Treadway & Marlatt. Miller was a member of the New York State Senate (32nd D.) from 1935 to 1938, sitting in the 158th, 159th, 160th and 161st New York State Legislatures. He represented Schenectady and Schenectady County. He was a delegate to the 1936 Republican National Convention.

Miller then became a senior member of the Miller & Beyerl law firm in Schenectady, working unitl he died. He was the attorney and a trustee for the Bank of Schenectady and president and treasurer of the Union Book Company.

== Personal life ==
On July 6, 1907, Miller married Miss Addie May Beck of Reading, Pennsylvania. Their children were Norman B., born October 7, 1911; Franklin P., born June 24, 1915; Melvin E., born February 5, 1918; and Charles E., born March 3, 1920.

Miller was an honorary member of Delta Theta Phi law fraternity, and was a member of the following Masonic bodies: Woodward Lodge No. 508, Free and Accepted Masons, Cleveland Chapter No. 148, Royal Arch Mason; Coeur deLion Commandery No. 64, Knights Templar; and Lake Erie Consistory, Scottish Rite. He was a member of the First English Lutheran Church and was active in its choir for ten years.

Miller died at Ellis Hospital in Schenectady on June 7, 1949, at the age of 65.

== Sources ==
- Coates, William R. (1924). A History of Cuyahoga County and the City of Cleveland. The American Historical Society. Archived from the original on December 31, 2018 – via onlinebiographies.info.

New York State Senate
| Preceded by Alexander G. Baxter | New York State Senate; 32nd District; 1935–1938 | Succeeded by Gilbert T. Seelye |
