= Harold Armstrong (politician) =

American politician

Harold C. Armstrong (August 1904-November 1987) was an American politician. A member of the Republican Party, he was elected to the New York State Legislature in 1933, 1934, 1935, 1936, 1937, 1938, 1940 and 1942.

New York State Assembly
Preceded by John H. Buhmaster	New York State Assembly; Schenectady County, 2nd District; 1934–1943	Succeeded by Wendell C. Wilber
