= James V. Mangano =

American politician

James V. Mangano (November 21, 1905 – October 28, 1988) was an American politician from New York.

== Life ==
Mangano was born on November 21, 1905, the son of Gaetano and Julia Mangano. Gaetano immigrated from Italy to Brooklyn, ran a funeral home called G. Mangano and Son on Union Street, and was heavily involved in the Brooklyn Democratic Party.

Mangano attended Manual Training High School, New York Prep, and St. John's College. He was a member of Phi Sigma Chi and the Colleague's Club. He initially went to work in his father's funeral home. In 1934, he was elected to the New York State Assembly as a Democrat, representing the Kings County 8th District. He served in the Assembly in 1935, 1936, and 1937. He was an alternate delegate in the 1936 Democratic National Convention, and would serve as a delegate for the 1940, 1956, 1960, and 1964 Democratic National Conventions. In 1937, he was elected Sheriff of Kings County. He served as Sheriff from 1938 to 1941. In 1941, he was elected a member of the New York State Democratic Committee. In 1942, the position of Sheriff of Kings County was abolished and replaced with a single, city-wide sheriff, making him the last Sheriff of Kings County.

Mangano worked as secretary to several New York Supreme Court Justices from 1942 to 1954. From 1954 to 1975, he was administrative director and general clerk of the State Supreme Court in Brooklyn.

In 1928, Mangano married Rose Mancaruso. Their son was New York Supreme Court Justice Guy Mangano.

Mangano died of cancer in Long Island College Hospital on October 28, 1988. He was buried in Holy Cross Cemetery.

New York State Assembly
Preceded by Luke O'Reilly (New York)	New York State Assembly; Kings County, 8th District; 1935-1937	Succeeded by Charles J. Beckinella
