= Frank B. Hendel =

American politician

Frank B. Hendel (July 23, 1892 – December 1973) was an American politician from New York.

== Life ==
He was born on July 23, 1892, in Middle Village, Queens. He engaged in the real estate and insurance business.

Hendel was a member of the New York State Assembly (Queens Co., 2nd D.) in 1927, 1928, 1929 and 1930.

He was a member of the New York State Senate (3rd D.) from 1931 to 1936, sitting in the 154th, 155th, 156th, 157th, 158th and 159th New York State Legislatures. In September 1936, Hendel was denied a renomination by the Democratic boss of Queens James C. Sheridan. Hendel challenged the party designee Peter T. Farrell in the Democratic primary, but lost.

He died in December 1973.

== Sources ==
New York State Assembly
Preceded by John T. Hammond	New York State Assembly; Queens County, 2nd District; 1927–1930	Succeeded by Joseph C. Mulligan
New York State Senate
Preceded by Alfred J. Kennedy	New York State Senate; 3rd District; 1931–1936	Succeeded by Peter T. Farrell
