= John G. Downs =

American farmer and politician

John Goldsmith Downs (August 20, 1873 – January 25, 1956) was an American farmer and politician from New York.

== Life ==
Downs was born on August 20, 1873, on a farm in Cutchogue, New York, the son of Henry V. Downs and Patience Hallock.

Downs worked as a farmer in Cutchogue, and was the president of the Suffolk County Agricultural Society for many years. He was also a trustee and vice-president of the Southold Savings Bank and a director of the Suffolk County Mutual Insurance Company of Southold.

In 1918, Downs was elected to the New York State Assembly as a Republican, representing the Suffolk County 1st District. He served in the Assembly in 1919, 1920, 1921, 1925, 1926, 1927, 1928, 1929, 1930, 1931, 1932, 1933, 1934, 1935, and 1936.

Downs was married to Edna Jones. She died in 1948.

Downs died at home on January 25, 1956. He was buried in Cutchogue Cemetery.

New York State Assembly
Preceded by DeWitt C. Talmage	New York State Assembly; Suffolk County, 1st District; 1919–1921	Succeeded by John G. Peck
Preceded by John G. Peck	New York State Assembly; Suffolk County, 1st District; 1925–1936	Succeeded by Edmund R. Lupton
