= Ogden J. Ross =

American politician

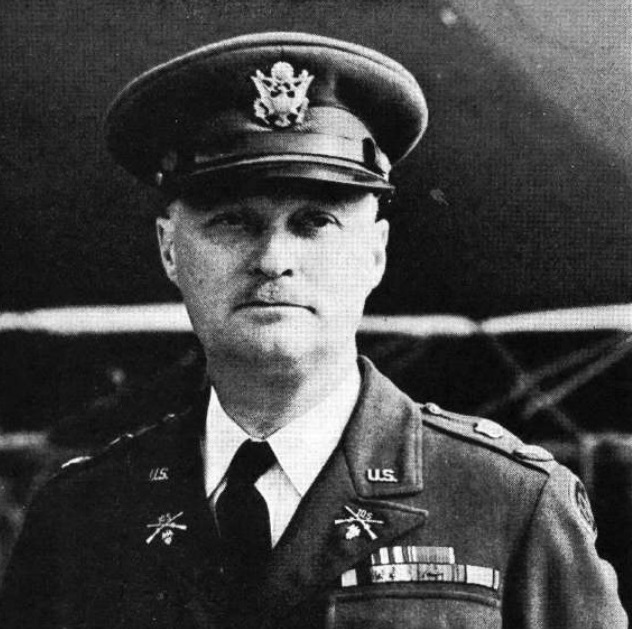

Member of the New York Senate from the 31st district
- In office 1933–1936
- Preceded by: John F. Williams
- Succeeded by: Clifford C. Hastings

Personal details
- Born: April 6, 1893 Troy, New York
- Died: October 27, 1968 (aged 75) Troy, New York
- Resting place: Oakwood Cemetery, Troy, New York
- Party: Democratic

Ogden John Ross (April 6, 1893 – October 27, 1968) was an American politician and U.S. Army general from New York.

== Life ==
He was born on April 6, 1893, in Troy, Rensselaer County, New York, the son of E. Ogden Ross. He studied at Troy Academy. He attended Rensselaer Polytechnic Institute for two years, then studied law with a local attorney. He attained admission to the bar and practiced in Troy.

He took part as a private in the Pancho Villa Expedition in 1916. During World War I he fought as a first lieutenant of the 105th Infantry with the American Expeditionary Forces in France, and was cited for valor during the Battle of the Hindenburg Line in September 1918. After the war he remained active in the National Guard, becoming colonel of the 105th Infantry in 1937. On February 17, 1920, he married Elizabeth W. Cheney.

Ross was a member of the New York State Senate (31st D.) from 1933 to 1936, sitting in the 156th, 157th, 158th and 159th New York State Legislatures. In February 1936, he was appointed as Chairman of the New York State Flood Control Commission, and remained in office until January 1941. He was a delegate to the New York State Constitutional Convention of 1938. On May 3, 1939, he was appointed to the New York State Tax Commission, and remained in office until January 1941.

In September 1940, he was promoted to brigadier general and succeeded Bernard W. Kearney as Commander of the 53rd Infantry Brigade of the New York National Guard. After the entry of the United States into World War II, his brigade went with the 27th Infantry Division to Hawaii and took part in several battles in the Pacific theater. In 1956, he was promoted to major general of the National Guard.

He died on October 27, 1968, in Troy, New York; and was buried at the Oakwood Cemetery there.

New York State Senate
Preceded by John F. Williams	New York State Senate; 31st District; 1933–1936	Succeeded by Clifford C. Hastings
