= Lee B. Mailler =

American politician

Lee Beattie Mailler (March 17, 1898 – September 22, 1967) was an American politician from New York.

== Life ==
He was born on March 17, 1898, in Cornwall-on-Hudson, Orange County, New York, the son of William Henry Mailler (1861–1929) and Sophia Jane (Preston) Mailler (1864–1941). He attended Cornwall-on-Hudson High School and Eastman Gaines Business College. He married Marion MacKenzie (1907–1976). He was for 15 years Superintendent of the Cornwall Hospital, and was a director and treasurer of the Highland Telephone Company.

Mailler was a member of the New York State Assembly (Orange Co., 1st D.) in 1934, 1935, 1936, 1937, 1938, 1939–40, 1941–42, 1943–44, 1945–46, 1947–48, 1949–50, 1951–52 and 1953–54.

He was Chairman of the New York State Parole Board from June 1954 to September 15, 1958.

He died on September 22, 1967, in Cornwall Hospital in Cornwall, New York, of leukemia; and was buried at the Cemetery of the Highlands in Highland Mills.

== Sources ==
New York State Assembly
Preceded by William J. Lamont	New York State Assembly; Orange County, 1st District; 1934–1954	Succeeded by D. Clinton Dominick III
Political offices
Preceded by Irving M. Ives	Majority Leader of the New York State Assembly; 1947–1954	Succeeded by Joseph F. Carlino
