= Jacob H. Livingston =

American lawyer and politician

Jacob H. Livingston (August 1, 1896 – October 21, 1950) was an American lawyer and politician from New York.

== Life ==
He was born on August 1, 1896, in New York City. He attended Public School No. 62 (Manhattan) and Townsend Harris High School. He graduated from the City College of New York in 1916. He married Rose, and they had one daughter: Helen D. (Livingston) Deixel.

Livingston was a member of the New York State Assembly (Kings Co., 22nd D.) in 1926, 1927, 1928, 1929, 1930, 1931, 1932, 1933, 1934 and 1935.

He was a member of the New York State Senate (9th D.) from 1936 to 1938, sitting in the 159th, 160th and 161st New York State Legislatures. He was a delegate to the New York State Constitutional Convention of 1938. At a hearing on Bellevue Hospital in April 1938, Livingston said that prison psychosis was "tommyrot", and asked psychiatrists to be less scientific, but more practical, when diagnosing criminal patients.

He was a justice of the City Court from 1939 to 1945; and of the New York Supreme Court (2nd D.) from 1946 until his death in 1950. In February 1947, on request by residents of St. Albans, Queens under a restrictive covenant, he enjoined a woman from selling her house to an African-American buyer. The injunction was upheld unanimously by the Appellate Division. In 1948, a bill to outlaw restrictive covenants was introduced in the Legislature. In July 1948, Livingston's injunction was overturned by the New York Court of Appeals.

He died on October 21, 1950, in Brooklyn.

== Sources ==
New York State Assembly
Preceded by Howard C. Franklin	New York State Assembly; Kings County, 22nd District; 1926–1935	Succeeded by Clement A. Shelton
New York State Senate
Preceded by Henry L. O'Brien	New York State Senate; 9th District; 1936–1938	Succeeded by Peter H. Ruvolo
