= Jane H. Todd =

American politician

Jane Hedges Todd (June 18, 1890 – November 8, 1966) was an American politician from New York.

== Life ==
She was born on June 18, 1890, the daughter of John Claredon Todd (1857–1931) and Elizabeth Buchanan (Ten Broeck) Todd (1861–1907).

She became active in politics in Westchester County, first as a suffragette, and then in the Republican Party. She was a delegate to the 1932, 1936, 1940, 1944, 1952, 1956 and 1964 Republican National Conventions; and an alternate delegate to the 1948 and 1960 Republican National Conventions.

Jane Todd was a member of the New York State Assembly (Westchester Co., 4th D.) in 1935, 1936, 1937, 1938, 1939–40, 1941–42 and 1943–44. In 1936, she introduced a bill in the Legislature to create a three-day waiting period for marriages (a so-called gin marriage law). She was Vice Chairwoman of the New York State Republican Committee from 1937 to 1959.

On June 7, 1945, she was appointed to the New York State Appeal Board on Job Insurance. On June 21, 1945, she was appointed as Deputy New York State Commissioner of Commerce, and remained in office until the end of Thomas E. Dewey's governorship in 1954.

In June 1959, she was again appointed as Deputy Commissioner of Commerce.

She died on November 8, 1966, at her home at 169 Neperan Road in Tarrytown, New York; and was buried at the Sleepy Hollow Cemetery in Sleepy Hollow.

== Sources ==
New York State Assembly
Preceded by Alexander H. Garnjost	New York State Assembly; Westchester County, 4th District; 1935–1944	Succeeded by Frank S. McCullough
