= Richard B. Smith (New York politician) =

New York politician

Richard Breson Smith (August 27, 1878 – February 26, 1937) was an American lawyer and politician from New York.

== Life ==
He was born on August 27, 1878, in Syracuse, New York, the son of Edward C. Smith (1843–1912) and Mary N. (Gannon) Smith (1850–1927). He attended the public schools and Syracuse High School. He graduated from Syracuse University College of Law in 1901, was admitted to the bar, and practiced in Syracuse. On June 24, 1903, he married Anna Leonard (1880–1921), and they had two sons.

He was a member of the Board of Supervisors of Onondaga County, elected in the 5th Ward of Syracuse, from 1912 to 1915. He was an Onondaga County Tax Appraiser from 1916 to 1923.

Smith was a member of the New York State Assembly (Onondaga Co., 3rd D.) in 1924, 1925, 1926, 1927, 1928, 1929, 1930, 1931, 1932, 1933, 1934, 1935, 1936 and 1937. He was Chairman of the Committee on Public Printing from 1927 to 1931; and Chairman of the Committee on Affairs of Cities in 1933 and 1934, and in 1936 and 1937.

He died on February 26, 1937, in Syracuse University Hospital in Syracuse, New York, after a cerebral hemorrhage; and was buried at the Oakwood Cemetery there.

== Sources ==
New York State Assembly
Preceded by Arthur Benson	New York State Assembly; Onondaga County, 3rd District; 1924–1937	Succeeded by Frank J. Costello
