= Duncan T. O'Brien =

American politician

Duncan T. O'Brien (March 28, 1895 – September 14, 1938) was an American politician from New York.

== Life ==
He was born on March 28, 1895, in New York City. He was an insurance broker, and entered politics as a Democrat.

He was a member of the New York State Senate (19th D.) from 1923 until his death in 1938, sitting in the 146th, 147th, 148th, 149th, 150th, 151st, 152nd, 153rd, 154th, 155th, 156th, 157th, 158th, 159th, 160th and 161st New York State Legislatures; and was Chairman of the Committee on Military Affairs from 1923 to 1924.

He died on September 14, 1938, of a cerebral hemorrhage; and was buried at Saint Raymond's Cemetery in the Throggs Neck section of the Bronx.

New York State Senate
Preceded by William Duggan	New York State Senate; 19th District; 1923–1938	Succeeded by Charles D. Perry
