= Denton D. Lake =

American politician

Denton Dennis Lake (September 15, 1887 – January 5, 1941) was an American politician from New York.

== Life ==
He was born on September 15, 1887, in Waterloo, Seneca County, New York, the son of Henry C. Lake and Caroline W. (Britcher) Lake (1865–1914). In 1907, he married Jennie B. Davis, and they had one daughter.

In 1918, he was commissioned as a first lieutenant of the United States Army Air Service and fought with the American Expeditionary Forces in France. In 1926, he was appointed as Postmaster of Gloversville.

Lake was a member of the New York State Assembly (Fulton and Hamilton Co.) in 1936, 1937, 1938 and 1939–40; and was Chairman of the Committee on Aviation from 1938 to 1940. He was re-elected to the 163rd New York State Legislature but died three days before the Legislature met.

He died on January 5, 1941; and was buried at the Ferndale Cemetery in Johnstown.

== Sources ==
New York State Assembly
Preceded by Harry F. Dunkel	New York State Assembly; Fulton and Hamilton Counties; 1936–1941	Succeeded by Joseph R. Younglove
