= James W. Riley =

American politician

James Wands Riley (1875 – July 23, 1954) was an American businessman and politician from New York.

== Life ==
He was born in 1875, the son of Millard Fillmore Riley (1850–1927) and Martha Wayne (Wands) Riley (1849–1922). Millard Riley was born in Brooklyn, and later moved Olean, Cattaraugus County, New York. There he opened with his brother-in-law Charles R. Wands in 1882 a retail grocery, in 1887 a wholesale grocery, and later also a cold storage building. James Riley took over the management of the company after his father's death, and retired from business in 1948.

Riley was a member of the New York State Assembly (Cattaraugus Co.) in 1931, 1932, 1933, 1934, 1935, 1936, 1937 and 1938; and was Chairman of the Committee on Military Affairs from 1937 to 1938.

He was a member of the New York State Senate (51st D.) from 1939 to 1942, sitting in the 162nd and 163rd New York State Legislatures. In August 1942, when running for re-nomination, he was defeated in the Republican primary election by George H. Pierce.

He died on July 23, 1954, in Olean General Hospital in Olean, New York; and was buried at the Mount View Cemetery there. He never married.

== Sources ==
New York State Assembly
Preceded by James W. Watson	New York State Assembly; Cattaraugus County; 1931–1938	Succeeded by William B. Kingsbury
New York State Senate
Preceded by Leigh G. Kirkland	New York State Senate; 51st District; 1939–1942	Succeeded by George H. Pierce
