= Doris I. Byrne =

American lawyer and politician

Doris Irene Byrne (June 13, 1905 – June 28, 1975) was an American lawyer and politician from New York. She was the first woman justice of the New York City Court of Special Sessions, appointed in 1950.

== Life ==
She was born on June 13, 1905, in the Bronx, New York City, the daughter of Daniel J. Byrne (died 1955) and Mabel Byrne.

Doris Byrne was a member of the New York State Assembly (Bronx Co., 2nd D.) in 1934, 1935, 1936 and 1937; and was Chairwoman of the Committee on Social Welfare in 1935. She resigned her seat upon the adjournment sine die of the legislature on May 8, 1937, and was appointed as Executive Deputy Secretary of State of New York.

On November 24, 1942, she was appointed to the New York City Council to fill the vacancy caused by the absence of Lt. Col. Charles E. Keegan, and took her seat on December 1.

She was a delegate to the 1944 and 1948 Democratic National Conventions; and was Vice Chairman of the New York State Democratic Committee in 1945.

In July 1948, she was appointed as a City Magistrate to fill a vacancy. In August 1949, she was appointed to a ten-year term as City Magistrate. In January 1950, she was appointed to the New York City Court of Special Sessions to fill a vacancy. In July 1950, she was appointed to a ten-year term on the Court of Special Sessions. She retired from the bench in 1965.

She died on June 28, 1975, at her home in Patchogue, New York.

== Sources ==
New York State Assembly
Preceded by William F. Smith	New York State Assembly; Bronx County, 2nd District; 1934–1937	Succeeded by Patrick J. Fogarty
