= Howard N. Allen =

American politician

Howard N. Allen (February 21, 1873 – January 7, 1953) was an American farmer, banker, and politician from New York.

== Life ==
Allen was born on February 21, 1873, in Pawling, New York, the son of Gideon Allen and Caroline Haynes.

Allen initially worked as a farmer. He operated the Allen Farms, which was in the family for four generations. He was a charter member of his local Grange and served as a director of the Dutchess County Farm Bureau. He owned 500 acres of farmland, mostly dedicated to dairy. He worked as a farmer for 40 years. He was also president of the Pawling Savings Bank and a director of the National Bank of Pawling.

Allen served as president of the village of Pawling for three years and town supervisor for six years. In 1922, he was elected to the New York State Assembly as a Republican, representing the Dutchess County 1st District. He served in the Assembly in 1923, 1924, 1925, 1926, 1927, 1928, 1929, 1930, 1931, 1932, 1933, 1934, 1935, 1936, 1937, 1938, the 162nd, 163rd, and 164th New York State Legislative session. Allen was chairman of the agricultural committee and co-author of the Rogers-Allen milk marketing bill of 1937.

In 1903, Allen married Ruth Ann Howard. Their children were Caroline K. and Howard N. Jr. He was a trustee of the local Methodist Episcopal Church and a member of the Freemasons.

Allen died at home on January 7, 1953. He suffered a heart attack the previous day during a directors meeting for the Pawling Savings Bank. He was buried in Pawling Cemetery.

New York State Assembly
Preceded by J. Griswold Webb	New York State Assembly; Dutchess County, 1st District; 1923-1944	Succeeded by District Abolished
