= James J. Crawford =

American politician

James J. Crawford (November 16, 1871 – March 30, 1954) was an American politician from New York.

== Life ==
He was born on November 16, 1871, in New York City, the son of John Thomas Crawford and Mary Ann (Donnelly) Crawford. The family removed to Williamsburg, Brooklyn. He attended Public School No. 17 in Brooklyn.

Crawford was a member of the New York State Senate (11th D.) from 1929 to 1952, sitting in the 152nd, 153rd, 154th, 155th, 156th, 157th, 158th, 159th, 160th, 161st, 162nd, 163rd, 164th, 165th, 166th, 167th and 168th New York State Legislatures. In the senate, he sponsored legislation to legalize betting on races in the state.

Crawford died at his home in Brooklyn at the age of 82.

== Sources ==
New York State Senate
Preceded by Louis J. Jacobson	New York State Senate; 11th District; 1929–1944	Succeeded by Fred G. Moritt
Preceded by Samuel L. Greenberg	New York State Senate; 8th District; 1945–1952	Succeeded by Thomas J. Cuite
