= Michael N. Delagi =

American lawyer, politician, and judge

Michael N. Delagi (April 22, 1879 – October 7, 1957) was an American lawyer, politician, and judge from New York.

== Life ==
Delagi was born on April 22, 1879, in New York City, New York.

Delagi attended St. Francis College in Brooklyn, graduated from New York Law School in 1905, and was admitted to the bar in 1906. A resident of the Bronx, he served as an assistant District Attorney of Bronx County in 1918, was appointed a city magistrate by Mayor John Francis Hylan, and was reappointed magistrate by Mayor Jimmy Walker. On December 7, 1929, he was one of sixty guests gathered at the Roman Gardens to honor Magistrate Albert H. Vitale upon his return to New York City when a hold-up man invaded the dinner and robbed the guests of $5,000. The investigation that followed became a political issue and a leading factor into the Seabury investigations, which he served as a witness of.

Delagi was chairman of the Democrat County Committee of the Seventh Assembly District, Bronx County. In 1934, he was elected to the New York State Assembly as a Democrat, representing the Bronx County 7th District. He served in the Assembly in 1935. He was elected Municipal Court Justice later that year, re-elected Justice in 1945, and served as Justice until he retired in 1949 after reaching the statutory age limitations.

Delagi was vice-president of the Arthur H. Murphy Association and a member of the Sons of Italy, the Elks, and the Bronx County Bar Association. His wife's name was Angela. His children were City Magistrate Nicholas F., Dr. Edward F., and Alfred E.

Delagi died in Frances Schervier Hospital in Riverdale on October 7, 1957.

New York State Assembly
Preceded by Magnus Lipton	New York State Assembly; Bronx County, 7th District; 1935	Succeeded by Bernard R. Fleisher
