= Michael J. Gillen =

American politician (1885–1942)

- Born: August 5, 1885; Brooklyn, New York
- Died: February 1, 1942 (aged 56); Brooklyn, New York
- Occupation: Politician

Michael J. Gillen (August 5, 1885 – February 1, 1942) was an American politician from New York.

== Early life and education ==
He was born on August 5, 1885, in Brooklyn, the son of John Gillen (1853–1924) and Margaret Nancy (McGrath) Gillen (1860–1944). He attended the public schools.

== Career ==
He engaged in the real estate and insurance business. .

Gillen was a member of the New York State Assembly (Kings Co., 3rd D.) in 1926, 1927, 1928, 1929, 1930, 1931, 1932, 1933, 1934, 1935, 1936, 1937, 1938, 1939–40 and 1941–42.

== Personal life ==
On February 4, 1917, he married Mary Agnes Burke (1894–1963), and they had several children

== Death ==
He died on February 1, 1942, in Brooklyn, of a heart attack; and was buried at the Holy Cross Cemetery there.

== Sources ==
New York State Assembly
Preceded by Frank J. Taylor	New York State Assembly; Kings County, 3rd District; 1926–1942	Succeeded by Mary A. Gillen
