= John J. McNaboe =

American lawyer and politician

John J. McNaboe (November 11, 1893 – June 1954) was an American lawyer and politician from New York.

== Life ==
He was born on November 11, 1893, in Newburgh, Orange County, New York. He graduated from Fordham Law School and practiced law in New York City. He was an Assistant New York County District Attorney from 1928 to 1930.

McNaboe was a member of the New York State Senate (16th D.) from 1931 to 1940, sitting in the 154th, 155th, 156th, 157th, 158th, 159th, 160th, 161st and 162nd New York State Legislatures. He was a member of the Hofstadter Committee. He was Chairman of a Joint Legislative Committee to Investigate Communist activities in 1938–1939. In 1940, he opposed a third term for President Franklin D. Roosevelt, and offered a resolution, passed by the State Senate, to require Congress to pass anti-third-term legislation.

He died in June 1954.

== Sources ==
New York State Senate
Preceded by Thomas I. Sheridan	New York State Senate; 16th District; 1931–1940	Succeeded by Francis J. McCaffrey, Jr.
