= Walter W. Stokes =

American politician (1880–1960)

Walter Watson Stokes (August 10, 1880 – March 27, 1960) was an American financier and politician from New York.

== Life ==
He was born on August 10, 1880, in Manchester, Bennington County, Vermont, the son of financier Walter C. Stokes (1852–1924) and Adele (Watson) Stokes (1852–1921). In 1901, he became a member of the New York Stock Exchange. On May 14, 1902, he married Mary L. Constable (born 1884), and they had one son: Walter Watson Stokes Jr. (born 1903). They lived at 829 Park Avenue in Manhattan, and the Stokes family's country home "Woodside Hall" in Cooperstown. In 1931, Mary Stokes went to Reno, Nevada, to get a divorce.

Stokes was a member of the New York State Senate from 1933 to 1952, sitting in the 156th, 157th, 158th, 159th, 160th, 161st, 162nd, 163rd, 164th, 165th, 166th, 167th and 168th New York State Legislatures.

On November 14, 1934, he married Hannah Lee Sherman (1905–2001), a grand-niece of Gen. William Tecumseh Sherman. Hannah Sherman was a photo model, famous at the time as "Miss Chesterfield".

He died on March 27, 1960, in Bassett Hospital in Cooperstown, New York; and was buried at the Lakewood Cemetery there.

== Sources ==
New York State Senate
Preceded by John W. Gates	New York State Senate; 39th District; 1933–1944	Succeeded by Rhoda Fox Graves
Preceded by Austin W. Erwin	New York State Senate; 44th District; 1945–1952	Succeeded by Wheeler Milmoe
