= John J. Howard =

American politician (1869–1941)

John J. Howard (1869 – January 24, 1941) was an American politician from New York.

== Early life ==
He was born in 1869 in Brooklyn, Kings County, New York.

== Career ==
Howard was a member of the New York State Assembly (Kings Co., 7th D.) in 1922, 1923, 1924, 1925, 1926, 1927, 1928, 1929 and 1930.

He was a member of the New York State Senate (5th D.) from 1931 until his death in 1941, sitting in the 154th, 155th, 156th, 157th, 158th, 159th, 160th, 161st, 162nd and 163rd New York State Legislatures.

== Death ==
He died on January 24, 1941, at his home at 453 Fifty-fifth Street in Brooklyn, of a heart attack.

== Sources ==
New York State Assembly
Preceded by John J. Kelly	New York State Assembly; Kings County, 7th District; 1922–1930	Succeeded by William Kirnan
New York State Senate
Preceded by Daniel F. Farrell	New York State Senate; 5th District; 1931–1941	Succeeded by William Kirnan
