= Alexander H. Garnjost =

American lawyer and politician

Alexander Hamilton Garnjost
- Born: January 5, 1894; Yonkers, New York, U.S.
- Died: July 2, 1937; St. John's Riverside Hospital, Yonkers, New York, U.S.
- Education: Cornell University, Columbia Law School
- Occupations: Lawyer, politician
- Political party: Republican
- Spouse: Elizabeth Conolly

Alexander Hamilton Garnjost (January 5, 1894 – July 2, 1937) was an American lawyer and politician from New York.

== Life ==
Garnjost was born on January 5, 1894, in Yonkers, New York, the son of realtor Fred A. Garnjost.

Garnjost graduated from Cornell University with an A.B. in 1917. During World War I, he was commissioned a first lieutenant with the 22nd Infantry. After the War, he entered Columbia Law School and graduated from there with an LL.B. in 1921. He also studied political science and received an M.A. at Columbia. After he was admitted to the bar, he worked with the firm Geller, Rolston & Blanc in New York City. In 1923, he opened law offices in Yonkers. His law offices were in Philipsburgh Building for over a decade, although he later moved to the First National Bank Building. He was also a director of the Westchester First National Corporation, the Central National Bank of Yonkers, and the Garnjost Realty Company.

In 1923, Garnjost was elected to the New York State Assembly as a Republican, representing the Westchester County 4th District. He served in the Assembly in 1924, 1925, 1926, 1927, 1928, 1929, 1930, 1931, 1932, 1933, and 1934. While in the Assembly, he proved crucial in passing legislation that provided for the electrification of the Yonker's branch of the New York Central Railroad's Putman Division, introduced legislation on insurance laws, forced extension of emergency rent legislation in Yonkers, aided tenants during an acute house shortage, obtained higher salaries and shorter hours for policemen in the county, supported old age pension, worked for income tax reduction, and advocated a tax on gas and the repeal the state's direct property tax and the decadent estate law. In 1934, the Republican Assembly District Convention refused to nominate him again and had Jane H. Todd run instead of him.

Garnjost was a member of Beta Theta Pi, the Freemasons, the American Legion, the Military Order of Foreign Wars, the Cornell University Club, Columbia University Club, the Westchester County Bar Association, the Odd Fellows, and the New York Athletic Club. In 1933, he married Elizabeth Conolly of New York City, a non-practicing lawyer.

Garnjost died in St. John's Riverside Hospital, where he suffered a relapse while recovering from an emergency appendectomy a week previously, on July 2, 1937. He was buried in the family plot in Oakland Cemetery.

New York State Assembly
Preceded by Russell B. Livermore	New York State Assembly; Westchester County, 4th District; 1924–1934	Succeeded by Jane H. Todd
