= Russell G. Dunmore =

New York politician and lawyer

Russell Goodier Dunmore (November 28, 1884 – December 14, 1935) was an American lawyer and politician from New York.

== Life ==
He was born on November 28, 1884, in Utica, Oneida County, New York, the son of County Judge Watson T. Dunmore (1845–1929) and Mary Elizabeth "Minnie" (Goodier) Dunmore (1854–1904). He attended Utica Academy, and graduated from Wesleyan University in 1908. He practiced law in Utica. On November 26, 1912, he married Emma Jessie Roberts (1886–1970), and they had two children.

Dunmore was a member of the New York State Assembly (Oneida Co., 2nd D.) in 1922, 1923, 1924, 1925, 1926, 1927, 1928, 1929, 1930, 1931, 1932, 1933, 1934 and 1935. He was Chairman of the Committee on Claims in 1924, and Majority Leader from 1927 to 1934.

He was found dead on December 14, 1935, at his home in New Hartford, New York, having died from a bullet wound in his head. The death was ruled an accident; and he was buried at the Green Lawn Cemetery in New Hartford.

== Sources ==
New York State Assembly
Preceded by Louis M. Martin	New York State Assembly; Oneida County, 2nd District; 1922–1935	Succeeded by William R. Williams
Political offices
Preceded by Simon L. Adler	Majority Leader in the New York State Assembly; 1927–1934	Succeeded by John F. Killgrew
