= 158th New York State Legislature =

New York state legislative session

←	157th	159th	→
- New York State Capitol (2009)

Overview
- Legislative body: New York State Legislature
- Jurisdiction: New York, United States
- Term: January 1 – December 31, 1935

Senate
- Members: 51
- President: Lt. Gov. M. William Bray (D)
- Temporary President: John J. Dunnigan (D)
- Party control: Democratic (29–22)

Assembly
- Members: 150
- Speaker: Irwin Steingut (D)
- Party control: Democratic (77–73)

Sessions
- 1st: January 2 – April 17, 1935

The 158th New York State Legislature, consisting of the New York State Senate and the New York State Assembly, met from January 2 to April 17, 1935, during the third year of Herbert H. Lehman's governorship, in Albany.

== Background ==
Under the provisions of the New York Constitution of 1894, re-apportioned in 1917, 51 Senators and 150 assemblymen were elected in single-seat districts; senators for a two-year term, assemblymen for a one-year term. The senatorial districts consisted either of one or more entire counties; or a contiguous area within a single county. The counties which were divided into more than one senatorial district were New York (nine districts), Kings (eight), Bronx (three), Erie (three), Monroe (two), Queens (two) and Westchester (two). The Assembly districts were made up of contiguous area, all within the same county.

At this time there were two major political parties: the Democratic Party and the Republican Party. The Socialist Party, the Communist Party and the Socialist Labor Party also nominated tickets. The Prohibition Party ran for the last time under the name of Law Preservation Party. In New York City, the "Recovery Party", the "City Fusion Party" and several other minor parties also nominated tickets.

== Elections ==
The 1934 New York state election was held on November 6. Governor Herbert H. Lehman and Lieutenant Governor M. William Bray were re-elected, both Democrats. Of the other eight statewide elective offices, six were carried by Democrats, one by the Republican chief judge with Democratic endorsement, and one by a Republican judge who ran on the Democratic ticket only. The approximate party strength at this election, as expressed by the vote for Governor, was: Democrats 2,202,000; Republicans 1,394,000; Socialists 127,000; Communists 46,000; Law Preservation 20,500; and Socialist Labor 7,000.

For the first time there were three women in the Legislature: Ex-Assemblywoman Rhoda Fox Graves (Rep.), of Gouverneur, a former school teacher who after her marriage became active in women's organisations and politics, was the first woman elected to the State Senate; Assemblywoman Doris I. Byrne (Dem.), a lawyer from the Bronx, was re-elected; and Jane H. Todd (Rep.), of Tarrytown, was also elected to the Assembly.

For the first time since 1913, Democratic majorities were elected to both Houses of the Legislature. It remained the only time until 1965.

== Sessions ==
The Legislature met for the regular session at the State Capitol in Albany on January 2, 1935; and adjourned on April 17.

Irwin Steingut (Dem.) was elected Speaker.

John J. Dunnigan (Dem.) as re-elected Temporary President of the State Senate.

On April 16, the Legislature passed a bill making nudism a misdemeanor.

== State Senate ==
=== Districts ===
- 1st District: Nassau and Suffolk counties
- 2nd and 3rd District: Parts of Queens County, i.e. the Borough of Queens
- 4th, 5th, 6th, 7th, 8th, 9th, 10th and 11th District: Parts of Kings County, i.e. the Borough of Brooklyn
- 12th, 13th, 14th, 15th, 16th, 17th, 18th, 19th and 20th District: Parts of New York County, i.e. the Borough of Manhattan
- 21st, 22nd and 23rd District: Parts of Bronx County, i.e. the Borough of the Bronx
- 24th District: Richmond County, i.e. the Borough of Richmond (now the Borough of Staten Island), and Rockland County
- 25th District: Part of Westchester County
- 26th District: Cortlandt, Greenburgh, Mount Pleasant, Ossining and part of Yonkers; in Westchester County
- 27th District: Orange and Sullivan counties
- 28th District: Columbia, Dutchess and Putnam counties
- 29th District: Delaware, Greene and Ulster counties
- 30th District: Albany County
- 31st District: Rensselaer County
- 32nd District: Saratoga and Schenectady counties
- 33rd District: Clinton, Essex, Warren and Washington counties
- 34th District: Franklin and St. Lawrence counties
- 35th District: Fulton, Hamilton, Herkimer and Lewis counties
- 36th District: Oneida County
- 37th District: Jefferson and Oswego counties
- 38th District: Onondaga County
- 39th District: Madison, Montgomery, Otsego and Schoharie counties
- 40th District: Broome, Chenango and Cortland counties
- 41st District: Chemung, Schuyler, Tioga and Tompkins counties
- 42nd District: Cayuga, Seneca and Wayne counties
- 43rd District: Ontario, Steuben and Yates counties
- 44th District: Allegany, Genesee, Livingston and Wyoming
- 45th and 46th District: Monroe County
- 47th District: Niagara and Orleans counties
- 48th, 49th and 50th District: Erie County
- 51st District: Cattaraugus and Chautauqua counties

=== Members ===
The asterisk (*) denotes members of the previous Legislature who continued in office as members of this Legislature. Edward J. Coughlin, Martin W. Deyo and George B. Kelly changed from the Assembly to the Senate.

Note: For brevity, the chairmanships omit the words "...the Committee on (the)..."

District	Senator	Party	Notes
1st	George L. Thompson*	Rep./Law P.	re-elected
2nd	Joseph D. Nunan Jr.*	Democrat	re-elected
3rd	Frank B. Hendel*	Dem./Rec.	re-elected
4th	Philip M. Kleinfeld*	Democrat	re-elected
5th	John J. Howard*	Dem./Rec.	re-elected
6th	Edward J. Coughlin*	Dem./Rec.	
7th	Jacob J. Schwartzwald	Democrat	
8th	Joseph A. Esquirol*	Democrat	re-elected
9th	Henry L. O'Brien*	Dem./Law P.	re-elected; died on February 8, 1935
10th	Jeremiah F. Twomey*	Democrat	re-elected; Chairman of Finance
11th	James J. Crawford*	Democrat	re-elected
12th	Elmer F. Quinn*	Democrat	re-elected
13th	Thomas F. Burchill*	Democrat	re-elected
14th	Samuel Mandelbaum*	Democrat	re-elected
15th	John L. Buckley*	Democrat	re-elected
16th	John J. McNaboe*	Democrat	re-elected
17th	Joseph Clark Baldwin	Rep./Law P.	
18th	John T. McCall*	Democrat	re-elected
19th	Duncan T. O'Brien*	Democrat	re-elected
20th	A. Spencer Feld*	Dem./Law P.	re-elected
21st	Lazarus Joseph*	Democrat	re-elected
22nd	Julius S. Berg*	Democrat	re-elected
23rd	John J. Dunnigan*	Democrat	re-elected; re-elected Temporary President
24th	Rae L. Egbert	Dem./Law P.	
25th	Pliny W. Williamson	Rep./Law P.	
26th	James A. Garrity	Democrat	
27th	Thomas C. Desmond*	Republican	re-elected
28th	Frederic H. Bontecou*	Rep./Law P.	re-elected
29th	Arthur H. Wicks*	Rep./Soc.	re-elected
30th	William T. Byrne*	Democrat	re-elected
31st	Ogden J. Ross*	Democrat	re-elected
32nd	Edwin E. Miller	Republican	
33rd	Benjamin F. Feinberg*	Republican	re-elected
34th	Rhoda Fox Graves	Republican	
35th	Henry I. Patrie*	Rep./Law P.	re-elected; died on March 3, 1935
36th	William H. Hampton	Republican	
37th	Perley A. Pitcher*	Rep./Law P.	re-elected
38th	George R. Fearon*	Republican	re-elected; Minority Leader
39th	Walter W. Stokes*	Republican	re-elected
40th	Martin W. Deyo*	Rep./Law P.	
41st	C. Tracey Stagg	Republican	
42nd	Charles J. Hewitt*	Republican	re-elected
43rd	Earle S. Warner*	Republican	re-elected
44th	Joe R. Hanley*	Rep./Law P.	re-elected
45th	George B. Kelly*	Democrat	
46th	Norman A. O'Brien	Democrat	
47th	William H. Lee*	Republican	re-elected
48th	David E. Doyle	Democrat	
49th	Stephen J. Wojtkowiak*	Democrat	re-elected
50th	Nelson W. Cheney*	Republican	re-elected
51st	Leigh G. Kirkland*	Rep./Law P.	re-elected

=== Employees ===
- Clerk: James J. Reilly

== State Assembly ==
=== Assemblymen ===
Note: For brevity, the chairmanships omit the words "...the Committee on (the)..."

District		Assemblymen	Party	Notes
Albany	1st	John H. Cahill*	Democrat	
Albany	2nd	John P. Hayes*	Democrat	Chairman of Affairs of Cities
Albany	3rd	S. Earl McDermott*	Dem./Law P.	
Allegany		Harry E. Goodrich*	Republican	
Bronx	1st	Matthew J. H. McLaughlin*	Democrat	
Bronx	2nd	Doris I. Byrne*	Dem./Law P.	Chairwoman of Social Welfare
Bronx	3rd	Carl Pack*	Democrat	
Bronx	4th	Samuel Weisman*	Democrat	
Bronx	5th	Benjamin Gladstone*	Democrat	
Bronx	6th	Christopher C. McGrath*	Democrat	Chairman of Public Education; on November 5, 1935, elected to the Municipal Court
Bronx	7th	Michael N. Delagi	Democrat	on November 5, 1935, elected to the Municipal Court
Bronx	8th	John A. Devany Jr.*	Dem./Law P.	
Broome	1st	Edward F. Vincent*	Republican	
Broome	2nd	James E. Hill	Republican	
Cattaraugus		James W. Riley*	Republican	
Cayuga		Andrew D. Burgdorf*	Rep./Law P.	
Chautauqua	1st	Lloyd J. Babcock	Rep./Law P.	
Chautauqua	2nd	Joseph A. McGinnies*	Rep./Law P.	
Chemung		Chauncey B. Hammond	Republican	
Chenango		Irving M. Ives*	Republican	Minority Leader
Clinton		McKenzie B. Stewart	Republican	
Columbia		Frederick A. Washburn*	Rep./Law P.	
Cortland		Albert Haskell Jr.	Republican	
Delaware		E. Ogden Bush*	Republican	
Dutchess	1st	Howard N. Allen*	Rep./Law P.	
Dutchess	2nd	Emerson D. Fite*	Rep./Law P.	
Erie	1st	Joseph A. Nicosia*	Democrat	
Erie	2nd	Harold B. Ehrlich*	Republican	
Erie	3rd	Bert Fischer	Democrat	
Erie	4th	Anthony J. Canney*	Democrat	
Erie	5th	Edwin L. Kantowski*	Democrat	
Erie	6th	John V. Kane	Democrat	
Erie	7th	Arthur L. Swartz*	Republican	
Erie	8th	R. Foster Piper*	Republican	
Essex		Fred L. Porter*	Republican	
Franklin		John H. Black	Republican	
Fulton and Hamilton		Harry F. Dunkel*	Republican	
Genesee		Herbert A. Rapp*	Republican	
Greene		William Haas	Dem./Soc.	
Herkimer		David C. Wightman*	Republican	
Jefferson		Russell Wright	Rep./Law P.	
Kings	1st	Crawford W. Hawkins*	Democrat	
Kings	2nd	Albert D. Schanzer*	Democrat	
Kings	3rd	Michael J. Gillen*	Dem./Rec.	
Kings	4th	Bernard Austin	Democrat	
Kings	5th	Charles R. McConnell	Democrat	
Kings	6th	Julius Helfand	Democrat	
Kings	7th	William Kirnan*	Dem./Rec.	
Kings	8th	James V. Mangano	Dem./Vict.	
Kings	9th	Daniel McNamara Jr.*	Dem./Rec.	
Kings	10th	William C. McCreery*	Democrat	Chairman of Judiciary
Kings	11th	Bernard J. Moran	Dem./Rec.	
Kings	12th	Edward S. Moran Jr.*	Dem./Rec.	Chairman of Insurance
Kings	13th	Ralph Schwartz	Dem./Rec.	
Kings	14th	Aaron F. Goldstein*	Dem./City F.	
Kings	15th	Edward P. Doyle*	Democrat	
Kings	16th	Carmine J. Marasco	Democrat	
Kings	17th	George W. Stewart*	Dem./Rec.	
Kings	18th	Irwin Steingut*	Dem./Law. P.	elected Speaker; Chairman of Rules
Kings	19th	George Kaminsky	Democrat	
Kings	20th	Joseph J. Monahan*	Democrat	
Kings	21st	Charles H. Breitbart*	Democrat	
Kings	22nd	Jacob H. Livingston*	Dem./Law P.	
Kings	23rd	G. Thomas Lo Re	Democrat	
Lewis		Edward M. Sheldon*	Republican	
Livingston		James J. Wadsworth*	Rep./Law P.	
Madison		Wheeler Milmoe*	Republican	
Monroe	1st	Pritchard H. Strong	Republican	
Monroe	2nd	Joseph Di Fede	Democrat	
Monroe	3rd	Earl C. Langenbacher*	Dem./Law P.	
Monroe	4th	Paul R. Taylor*	Dem./Law P.	Chairman of Internal Affairs
Monroe	5th	Donald J. Corbett*	Democrat	
Montgomery		L. James Shaver*	Republican	
Nassau	1st	Harold P. Herman*	Republican	
Nassau	2nd	Leonard W. Hall*	Republican	
New York	1st	James J. Dooling*	Democrat	
New York	2nd	Nicholas A. Rossi	Democrat	
New York	3rd	Eugene R. Duffy*	Democrat	
New York	4th	Leonard Farbstein*	Democrat	
New York	5th	John F. Killgrew*	Democrat	Majority Leader
New York	6th	Irving D. Neustein*	Democrat	
New York	7th	Saul S. Streit*	Dem./ICL	Chairman of Re-Apportionment
New York	8th	Joseph Hamerman*	Democrat	
New York	9th	Ira H. Holley	Dem./Law P.	
New York	10th	Herbert Brownell Jr.*	Rep./City F.	
New York	11th	Patrick H. Sullivan*	Democrat	
New York	12th	John A. Byrnes*	Democrat	Chairman of Codes
New York	13th	William J. Sheldrick*	Democrat	Chairman of Motor Vehicles
New York	14th	Francis J. McCaffrey Jr.*	Democrat	
New York	15th	Abbot Low Moffat*	Rep./Law P./C. F.	
New York	16th	William Schwartz*	Democrat	
New York	17th	Meyer Alterman*	Democrat	Chairman of Ways and Means
New York	18th	Salvatore A. Farenga	Democrat	
New York	19th	James E. Stephens*	Dem./Law P.	
New York	20th	Louis A. Cuvillier	Democrat	Democratic Whip; died on May 18, 1935
New York	21st	William T. Andrews	Dem./Law P.	
New York	22nd	Daniel Flynn*	Democrat	
New York	23rd	Alexander A. Falk	Dem./Law P.	Chairman of Taxation and Retrenchment
Niagara	1st	Fayette E. Pease*	Rep./Law P.	
Niagara	2nd	Harry D. Suitor*	Republican	
Oneida	1st	Frank T. Quinn*	Democrat	
Oneida	2nd	Russell G. Dunmore*	Republican	died on December 14, 1935
Oneida	3rd	Fred L. Meiss*	Republican	
Onondaga	1st	Horace M. Stone*	Republican	
Onondaga	2nd	George B. Parsons*	Republican	
Onondaga	3rd	Richard B. Smith*	Republican	
Ontario		Harry R. Marble*	Republican	
Orange	1st	Lee B. Mailler*	Republican	
Orange	2nd	Rainey S. Taylor*	Republican	
Orleans		John S. Thompson*	Republican	
Oswego		Ernest J. Lonis	Rep./Law P.	
Otsego		Frank G. Sherman	Republican	
Putnam		D. Mallory Stephens*	Republican	
Queens	1st	Harold J. Crawford*	Dem./Law P.	
Queens	2nd	George F. Torsney*	Dem./Law P.	
Queens	3rd	Peter T. Farrell*	Dem./Law P.	Chairman of General Laws
Queens	4th	James A. Burke	Dem./Lib./Rec.	
Queens	5th	Maurice A. FitzGerald*	Democrat	Chairman of Public Service
Queens	6th	Frederick L. Zimmerman*	Dem./City F.	
Rensselaer	1st	Michael F. Breen*	Dem./Soc.	
Rensselaer	2nd	Maurice Whitney*	Republican	
Richmond	1st	Charles Harry Robillard	Dem./Law P.	
Richmond	2nd	Herman Methfessel	Democrat	
Rockland		Laurens M. Hamilton*	Republican	
St. Lawrence	1st	W. Allan Newell*	Republican	
St. Lawrence	2nd	Warren O. Daniels*	Republican	
Saratoga		William E. Morris*	Republican	
Schenectady	1st	Oswald D. Heck*	Republican	
Schenectady	2nd	Harold Armstrong*	Rep./Law P.	
Schoharie		William S. Dunn*	Dem./Soc.	Chairman of Agriculture
Schuyler		Edward K. Corwin*	Republican	
Seneca		James D. Pollard*	Republican	
Steuben	1st	Wilson Messer*	Republican	
Steuben	2nd	J. Austin Otto*	Republican	
Suffolk	1st	John G. Downs*	Republican	
Suffolk	2nd	Hamilton F. Potter*	Rep./Law P.	
Sullivan		J. Maxwell Knapp*	Republican	
Tioga		Frank G. Miller*	Republican	
Tompkins		James R. Robinson*	Republican	
Ulster		J. Edward Conway*	Rep./Soc.	
Warren		Harry A. Reoux*	Republican	
Washington		Herbert A. Bartholomew*	Republican	
Wayne		Harry L. Averill*	Rep./Law P.	
Westchester	1st	Herbert R. Smith*	Republican	
Westchester	2nd	Ralph A. Gamble*	Republican	
Westchester	3rd	Hugh A. Lavery*	Democrat	
Westchester	4th	Jane H. Todd	Republican	
Westchester	5th	William F. Condon*	Republican	on November 5, 1935, elected Register of Westchester Co.
Wyoming		Harold C. Ostertag*	Republican	
Yates		Fred S. Hollowell*	Republican	

=== Employees ===
- Clerk: Homer W. Storey

== Sources ==
- Members of the New York Senate (1930s) at Political Graveyard
- Members of the New York Assembly (1930s) at Political Graveyard
- IVES IS ELECTED MINORITY LEADER in the Daily Sentinel, of Rome, on January 2, 1935
- CHAIRMAN OF CHOICE POST in the Plattsburgh Daily Republican, of Plattsburgh, on January 8, 1935
