= Harry D. Suitor =

New York politician

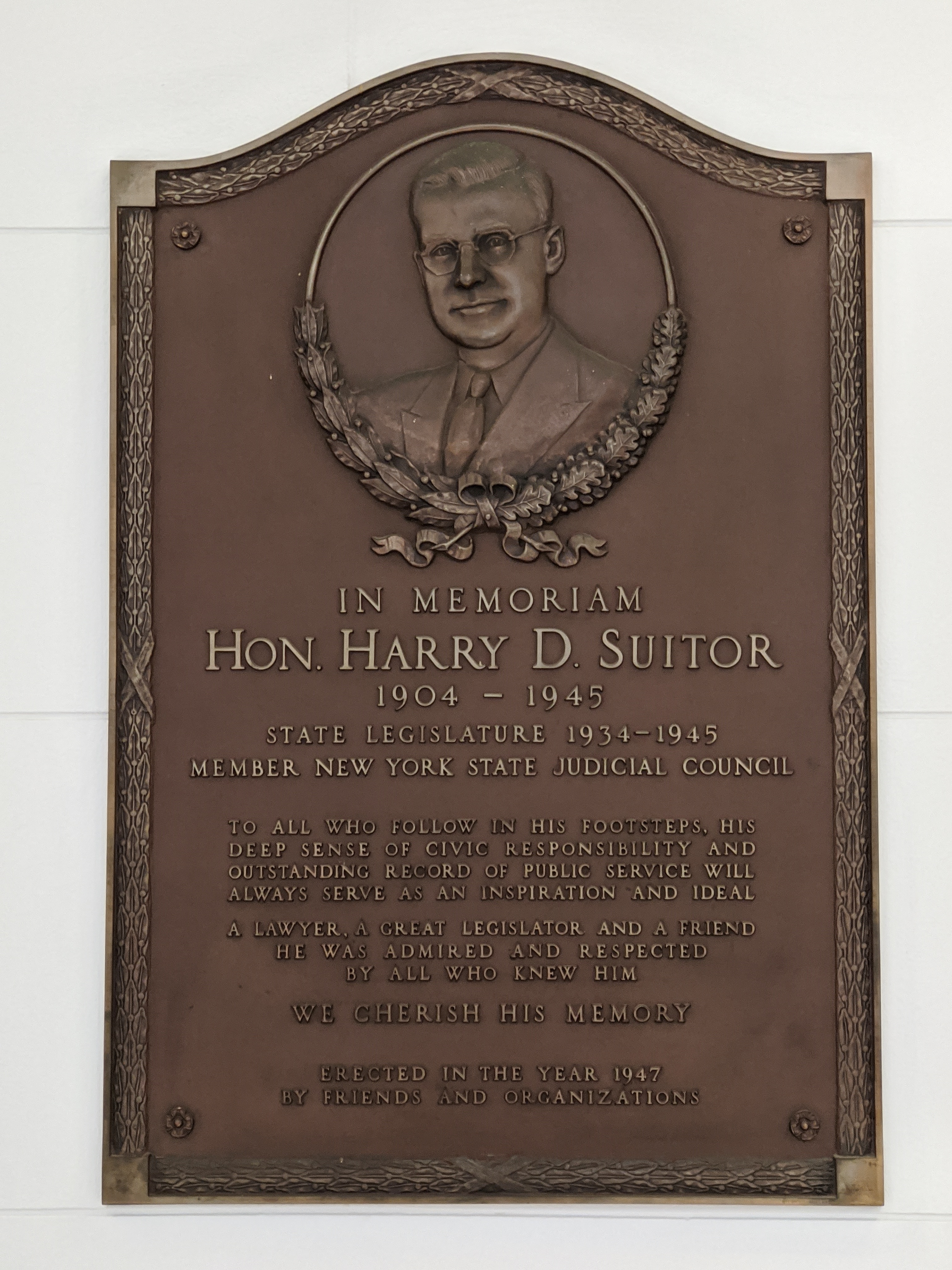
- Plaque commemorating suitor on the first floor of Niagara Falls City Hall
- Born: January 30, 1904; Chatham, Ontario
- Died: March 25, 1945 (aged 41); Niagara Falls Memorial Hospital
- Education: University of Buffalo Law School
- Occupation: New York State Assemblyman
Years active
1934–1945
Harry D. Suitor
- In office 1934–1945
- Political party: Republican

Harry D. Suitor (January 30, 1904 – March 25, 1945) was an American lawyer and politician from New York.

== Life ==
He was born on January 30, 1904, in Chatham, Ontario, Canada. As a child he was brought to Niagara Falls, New York and was raised by John W. Broderick and his wife. He graduated from Niagara Falls High School in 1924, and from University of Buffalo Law School. He was admitted to the bar in 1930, and practiced law in partnership with Earl W. Brydges. On November 23, 1935, he married Katherine Daw, and they had two children. They resided in Youngstown, New York.

Suitor was a member of the New York State Assembly (Niagara Co., 2nd D.) from 1934 until his death in 1945, sitting in the 157th, 158th, 159th, 160th, 161st, 162nd, 163rd, 164th and 165th New York State Legislatures. He was Chairman of the Committee on Codes from 1937 to 1945.

He died on March 25, 1945, in Memorial Hospital in Niagara Falls, New York, after an embolism of the brain; and was buried at the Gate of Heaven Cemetery in Lewiston.

== Sources ==
New York State Assembly
Preceded by Roy Hewitt	New York State Assembly; Niagara County, 2nd District; 1934–1945	Succeeded by Ernest Curto
