= Harry F. Dunkel =

American politician

Member of the New York State Senate from the 35th district
- In office January 1, 1936 – December 31, 1938
- Preceded by: Henry I. Patrie
- Succeeded by: Fred A. Young

Member of the New York State Assembly for Fulton and Hamilton
- In office January 1, 1932 – December 31, 1935
- Preceded by: Eberly Hutchinson
- Succeeded by: Denton D. Lake

Personal details
- Born: May 14, 1898 Gloversville, New York, U.S.
- Died: May 4, 1990 (aged 91)
- Party: Republican
- Spouse: Mildred
- Education: Albany Law School

Harry F. Dunkel (May 14, 1898 – May 4, 1990) was an American lawyer and politician from New York.

== Life ==
He was born on May 14, 1898, in Fulton County, New York. He attended the public schools in Gloversville. He graduated from Albany Law School, and practiced law in Gloversville. He was Clerk of the Board of Supervisors of Fulton County from 1926 to 1931.

Dunkel was a member of the New York State Assembly (Fulton and Hamilton Co.) in 1932, 1933, 1934 and 1935.

He was a member of the New York State Senate (35th D.) from 1936 to 1938, sitting in the 159th, 160th, and 161st New York State Legislatures.

Later, he was at times County Attorney of Hamilton County, and Town Attorney of Lake Pleasant.

He died on May 4, 1990.

== Sources ==
New York State Assembly
Preceded by Eberly Hutchinson	New York State Assembly; Fulton and Hamilton Counties; 1932–1935	Succeeded by Denton D. Lake
New York State Senate
Preceded by Henry I. Patrie	New York State Senate; 35th District; 1936–1938	Succeeded by Fred A. Young
