= William H. Lee (New York politician) =

American politician (1876–1954)

William H. Lee (December 8, 1876 – April 29, 1954) was an American businessman and politician from New York.

== Life ==
He was born on December 8, 1876, in Newfane, Niagara County, New York, the son of Albert H. Lee and Anna (Jones) Lee. He attended the public schools, and engaged in farming and other occupations while attending high school every other year for some time. He married Elizabeth M. Gold, and became a post office clerk in Lockport. In 1905, he began to work as a book-keeper at the Lockport Felt Company, was elected to the board of directors of the company in 1907. In 1916, he bought a controlling interest, and eventually became president, and in 1951 chairman of the board.

He was an alternate delegate to the 1932, 1936, 1944 and 1952 Republican National Conventions, and a delegate to the 1940 Republican National Convention.

Lee was a member of the New York State Senate (47th D.) from 1933 to 1938, sitting in the 156th, 157th, 158th, 159th, 160th and 161st New York State Legislatures.

He died on April 29, 1954, at his home in Lockport, New York.

His son Raymond J. Lee (1917–2012) was a member of the New York State Athletic Commission from 1962 to 1971, and was appointed to the New York Power Authority in 1974.

== Sources ==
New York State Senate
Preceded by William W. Campbell	New York State Senate; 47th District; 1933–1938	Succeeded by William Bewley
