= 157th New York State Legislature =

New York state legislative session

←	156th	158th	→
- New York State Capitol (2009)

Overview
- Legislative body: New York State Legislature
- Jurisdiction: New York, United States
- Term: January 1 – December 31, 1934

Senate
- Members: 51
- President: Lt. Gov. M. William Bray (D)
- Temporary President: John J. Dunnigan (D)
- Party control: Democratic (26–25)

Assembly
- Members: 150
- Speaker: Joseph A. McGinnies (R)
- Party control: Republican (85–65)

Sessions
- 1st: January 3 – April 28, 1934
- 2nd: July 10 – August 18, 1934

The 157th New York State Legislature, consisting of the New York State Senate and the New York State Assembly, met from January 3 to August 18, 1934, during the second year of Herbert H. Lehman's governorship, in Albany.

== Background ==
Under the provisions of the New York Constitution of 1894, re-apportioned in 1917, 51 Senators and 150 assemblymen were elected in single-seat districts; senators for a two-year term, assemblymen for a one-year term. The senatorial districts consisted either of one or more entire counties; or a contiguous area within a single county. The counties which were divided into more than one senatorial district were New York (nine districts), Kings (eight), Bronx (three), Erie (three), Monroe (two), Queens (two) and Westchester (two). The Assembly districts were made up of contiguous area, all within the same county.

At this time there were two major political parties: the Democratic Party and the Republican Party. The Socialist Party and the Communist Party also nominated tickets. The Prohibition Party adopted at this time the name Law Preservation Party: to emphasize that Prohibition should be preserved while it was in the process of being repealed. They endorsed the "dry" candidates (mostly Republicans) and nominated own candidates in many districts where "wet" candidates were the front-runners. In New York City, a "City Fusion" (generally allied with the Republicans) and a "Recovery" (Anti-Tammany Democrats supporting Joseph V. McKee) ticket were nominated for the local elections held at the same time.

== Elections ==
The 1933 New York state election was held on November 7. The only statewide elective office up for election was a judgeship on the New York Court of Appeals which was carried by the incumbent Democrat Leonard C. Crouch who was nominated by the Democrats and endorsed by the Republicans, the Law Preservation Party and the City Fusion.

The approximate party strength at this election, as expressed by the vote for Judge of the Court of Appeals, was: Democrats/Republicans/Law Preservation/City Fusion 3,250,000; Socialists 100,000; and Communists 31,000.

Doris I. Byrne (Dem.), a lawyer from the Bronx, was the only woman elected to the 157th Legislature.

== Sessions ==
The Legislature met for the regular session at the State Capitol in Albany on January 3, 1934; and adjourned at 2.30 a.m. on April 28.

Joseph A. McGinnies (Rep.) was re-elected Speaker.

Marguerite O'Connell (Dem.) was elected Clerk of the New York State Senate to fill the unexpired term of her deceased husband Patrick H. O'Connell, becoming the first woman to hold this office.

Assembly Clerk Fred W. Hammond (Rep.) encountered opposition from the Republican State Committee Chairman W. Kingsland Macy who instructed his followers not to vote for Hammond. The second ballot for assembly clerk, on January 4, stood: Hammond 66; Louis A. Cuvillier (Dem.) 62; Charles F. Close (Rep.) 16; Ward H. Arburry 3; and Clement Curry 1. The split persisted, and no clerk could be elected. On January 12, in an unprecedented move, Speaker McGinnies appointed Hammond as Clerk without election.

State Senator Warren T. Thayer (Rep.) was accused to act as a lobbyist for a utility company while having been chairman of the senate committee in charge of the pertaining legislation. He resigned his seat on June 11. He was tried before the Senate Committee on the Judiciary and on June 19, the State Senate in special session found Thayer guilty of official misconduct by the unanimous vote of the 47 senators present.

The Legislature met for a special session at the State Capitol in Albany on July 10, 1934; and adjourned on August 18.

== State Senate ==
=== Districts ===
- 1st District: Nassau and Suffolk counties
- 2nd and 3rd District: Parts of Queens County, i.e. the Borough of Queens
- 4th, 5th, 6th, 7th, 8th, 9th, 10th and 11th District: Parts of Kings County, i.e. the Borough of Brooklyn
- 12th, 13th, 14th, 15th, 16th, 17th, 18th, 19th and 20th District: Parts of New York County, i.e. the Borough of Manhattan
- 21st, 22nd and 23rd District: Parts of Bronx County, i.e. the Borough of the Bronx
- 24th District: Richmond County, i.e. the Borough of Richmond (now the Borough of Staten Island), and Rockland County
- 25th District: Part of Westchester County
- 26th District: Cortlandt, Greenburgh, Mount Pleasant, Ossining and part of Yonkers; in Westchester County
- 27th District: Orange and Sullivan counties
- 28th District: Columbia, Dutchess and Putnam counties
- 29th District: Delaware, Greene and Ulster counties
- 30th District: Albany County
- 31st District: Rensselaer County
- 32nd District: Saratoga and Schenectady counties
- 33rd District: Clinton, Essex, Warren and Washington counties
- 34th District: Franklin and St. Lawrence counties
- 35th District: Fulton, Hamilton, Herkimer and Lewis counties
- 36th District: Oneida County
- 37th District: Jefferson and Oswego counties
- 38th District: Onondaga County
- 39th District: Madison, Montgomery, Otsego and Schoharie counties
- 40th District: Broome, Chenango and Cortland counties
- 41st District: Chemung, Schuyler, Tioga and Tompkins counties
- 42nd District: Cayuga, Seneca and Wayne counties
- 43rd District: Ontario, Steuben and Yates counties
- 44th District: Allegany, Genesee, Livingston and Wyoming
- 45th and 46th District: Monroe County
- 47th District: Niagara and Orleans counties
- 48th, 49th and 50th District: Erie County
- 51st District: Cattaraugus and Chautauqua counties

=== Members ===
The asterisk (*) denotes members of the previous Legislature who continued in office as members of this Legislature.

Note: For brevity, the chairmanships omit the words "...the Committee on (the)..."

District	Senator	Party	Notes
1st	George L. Thompson*	Republican	
2nd	Joseph D. Nunan Jr.*	Democrat	Chairman of Civil Service
3rd	Frank B. Hendel*	Democrat	Chairman of Public Printing
4th	Philip M. Kleinfeld*	Democrat	Chairman of Excise
5th	John J. Howard*	Democrat	Chairman of Penal Institutions
6th	Marcellus H. Evans*	Democrat	Chairman of General Laws; on November 6, 1934, elected to the 74th U.S. Congress
7th	George Blumberg*	Republican	
8th	Joseph A. Esquirol*	Democrat	Chairman of Public Health
9th	Henry L. O'Brien*	Democrat	Chairman of Labor and Industry
10th	Jeremiah F. Twomey*	Democrat	Chairman of Finance
11th	James J. Crawford*	Democrat	Chairman of Pensions
12th	Elmer F. Quinn*	Democrat	Chairman of Codes
13th	Thomas F. Burchill*	Democrat	Chairman of Public Service
14th	Samuel Mandelbaum*	Democrat	Chairman of Cities
15th	John L. Buckley*	Democrat	Chairman of Taxation and Retrenchment
16th	John J. McNaboe*	Democrat	Chairman of Conservation; and of Re-Apportionment
17th	Albert Wald*	Democrat	Chairman of Revision
18th	John T. McCall*	Democrat	Chairman of Banks
19th	Duncan T. O'Brien*	Democrat	Chairman of Insurance
20th	A. Spencer Feld*	Democrat	Chairman of Public Education
21st	Lazarus Joseph	Democrat	elected to fill vacancy, in place of Henry G. Schackno; Chairman of Printed and Engrossed Bills
22nd	Julius S. Berg*	Democrat	Chairman of Privileges and Elections
23rd	John J. Dunnigan*	Democrat	Temporary President; Chairman of Rules
24th	Harry J. Palmer*	Democrat	Chairman of Internal Affairs
25th	Walter W. Westall*	Republican	
26th	Seabury C. Mastick*	Rep./Law P.	
27th	Thomas C. Desmond*	Republican	
28th	J. Griswold Webb*	Republican	died on May 5, 1934
28th	Frederic H. Bontecou	Republican	elected on July 5 to fill vacancy
29th	Arthur H. Wicks*	Rep./Law P.	
30th	William T. Byrne*	Democrat	Chairman of Judiciary; and of Agriculture
31st	Ogden J. Ross*	Democrat	Chairman of Military Affairs
32nd	Alexander G. Baxter*	Republican	died on August 30, 1934
33rd	Benjamin F. Feinberg*	Republican	
34th	Warren T. Thayer*	Republican	resigned his seat on June 11
35th	Henry I. Patrie*	Rep./Law P.	
36th	Michael J. Kernan*	Democrat	Chairman of Affairs of Villages
37th	Perley A. Pitcher*	Republican	
38th	George R. Fearon*	Republican	Minority Leader
39th	Walter W. Stokes*	Republican	
40th	Bert Lord*	Rep./Law P.	on November 6, 1934, elected to the 74th U.S. Congress
41st	Frank A. Frost*	Rep./Law P.	
42nd	Charles J. Hewitt*	Republican	
43rd	Earle S. Warner*	Republican	
44th	Joe R. Hanley*	Rep./Law P.	
45th	Cosmo A. Cilano*	Republican	
46th	Fred J. Slater*	Republican	
47th	William H. Lee*	Republican	
48th	Lawrence G. Williams*	Republican	
49th	Stephen J. Wojtkowiak*	Democrat	Chairman of Commerce and Navigation
50th	Nelson W. Cheney*	Republican	
51st	Leigh G. Kirkland*	Rep./Law P.	

=== Employees ===
- Clerk: Marguerite O'Connell

== State Assembly ==
=== Assemblymen ===
Note: For brevity, the chairmanships omit the words "...the Committee on (the)..."

District		Assemblymen	Party	Notes
Albany	1st	John H. Cahill*	Democrat	
Albany	2nd	John P. Hayes*	Democrat	
Albany	3rd	S. Earl McDermott*	Democrat	
Allegany		Harry E. Goodrich*	Republican	Chairman of Charitable and Religious Societies
Bronx	1st	Matthew J. H. McLaughlin	Dem./Rec.	
Bronx	2nd	Doris I. Byrne	Dem./Rec.	
Bronx	3rd	Carl Pack*	Dem./Rec.	
Bronx	4th	Samuel Weisman	Dem./Rec.	
Bronx	5th	Benjamin Gladstone	Dem./Rec.	
Bronx	6th	Christopher C. McGrath*	Dem./Rec.	
Bronx	7th	Magnus Lipton	Rep./City F.	
Bronx	8th	John A. Devany Jr.*	Dem./Rec.	
Broome	1st	Edward F. Vincent	Rep./Law P.	
Broome	2nd	Martin W. Deyo*	Rep./Law P.	
Cattaraugus		James W. Riley*	Republican	
Cayuga		Andrew D. Burgdorf	Rep./Law P.	
Chautauqua	1st	David L. Brunstrom*	Republican	
Chautauqua	2nd	Joseph A. McGinnies*	Republican	re-elected Speaker
Chemung		Thomas Jacob Banfield	Democrat	
Chenango		Irving M. Ives*	Republican	Chairman of Public Education
Clinton		Leo E. Trombly*	Democrat	
Columbia		Frederick A. Washburn*	Republican	
Cortland		Albert Haskell Jr.	Republican	
Delaware		E. Ogden Bush*	Republican	
Dutchess	1st	Howard N. Allen*	Rep./Law P.	
Dutchess	2nd	Emerson D. Fite	Rep./Law P.	
Erie	1st	Joseph A. Nicosia	Democrat	
Erie	2nd	Harold B. Ehrlich	Republican	
Erie	3rd	Frank X. Bernhardt*	Republican	Chairman of Excise
Erie	4th	Anthony J. Canney*	Democrat	
Erie	5th	Edwin L. Kantowski*	Democrat	
Erie	6th	Howard W. Dickey*	Republican	Chairman of General Laws
Erie	7th	Arthur L. Swartz*	Republican	Chairman of Penal Institutions
Erie	8th	R. Foster Piper*	Republican	Chairman of Affairs of Villages
Essex		Fred L. Porter*	Republican	Chairman of Ways and Means
Franklin		James A. Latour*	Republican	
Fulton and Hamilton		Harry F. Dunkel*	Republican	
Genesee		Herbert A. Rapp*	Republican	
Greene		Ellis W. Bentley*	Republican	Chairman of Conservation
Herkimer		David C. Wightman	Republican	
Jefferson		Jasper W. Cornaire*	Rep./Law P.	Chairman of Motor Vehicles
Kings	1st	Crawford W. Hawkins*	Dem./Rec./Law P.	
Kings	2nd	Albert D. Schanzer*	Dem./Rec.	
Kings	3rd	Michael J. Gillen*	Democrat	
Kings	4th	George E. Dennen*	Dem./Rec.	
Kings	5th	John J. Cooney*	Dem./Rec.	
Kings	6th	Samson Inselbuch	Rep./City F.	
Kings	7th	William Kirnan*	Dem./Rec.	
Kings	8th	Luke O'Reilly*	Dem./Rec.	
Kings	9th	Daniel McNamara Jr.*	Dem./Rec.	
Kings	10th	William C. McCreery*	Dem./Rec.	
Kings	11th	Edward J. Coughlin*	Dem./Rec.	
Kings	12th	Edward S. Moran Jr.*	Dem./Rec.	
Kings	13th	William Breitenbach*	Dem./Rec.	
Kings	14th	Aaron F. Goldstein	Dem./Rec.	
Kings	15th	Edward P. Doyle*	Democrat	
Kings	16th	Rudolph Bauer	Rep./City F.	
Kings	17th	George W. Stewart*	Dem./Rec.	
Kings	18th	Irwin Steingut*	Dem./Rec.	Minority Leader
Kings	19th	Alexander Berley	Rep./City F.	
Kings	20th	Joseph J. Monahan*	Dem./Rec.	
Kings	21st	Charles H. Breitbart*	Dem./Rec.	
Kings	22nd	Jacob H. Livingston*	Dem./Rec.	
Kings	23rd	Albert M. Cohen*	Dem./Rec.	
Lewis		Edward M. Sheldon*	Republican	
Livingston		James J. Wadsworth*	Republican	
Madison		Wheeler Milmoe	Republican	
Monroe	1st	Daniel J. O'Mara*	Republican	
Monroe	2nd	George B. Kelly*	Democrat	
Monroe	3rd	Earl C. Langenbacher	Democrat	
Monroe	4th	Paul R. Taylor	Democrat	
Monroe	5th	Donald J. Corbett	Democrat	
Montgomery		L. James Shaver*	Republican	
Nassau	1st	Harold P. Herman	Republican	
Nassau	2nd	Leonard W. Hall	Republican	
New York	1st	James J. Dooling*	Democrat	
New York	2nd	Millard E. Theodore*	Democrat	
New York	3rd	Eugene R. Duffy	Democrat	
New York	4th	Leonard Farbstein*	Democrat	
New York	5th	John F. Killgrew*	Democrat	
New York	6th	Irving D. Neustein*	Democrat	
New York	7th	Saul S. Streit*	Dem./ICL	
New York	8th	Joseph Hamerman*	Democrat	
New York	9th	I. Arnold Ross	Rep./City F.	
New York	10th	Herbert Brownell Jr.*	Republican	
New York	11th	Patrick H. Sullivan*	Democrat	
New York	12th	John A. Byrnes*	Democrat	
New York	13th	William J. Sheldrick*	Democrat	
New York	14th	Francis J. McCaffrey Jr.	Dem./Rec.	
New York	15th	Abbot Low Moffat*	Rep./City F.	Chairman of Affairs of New York City
New York	16th	William Schwartz*	Democrat	
New York	17th	Meyer Alterman*	Dem./Rec.	
New York	18th	Ernest Lappano	Rep./City F.	
New York	19th	James E. Stephens*	Democrat	
New York	20th	Wilbur J. Murphy	Rep./City F.	
New York	21st	Robert Bernstein	Dem./Rec.	
New York	22nd	Daniel Flynn	Democrat	
New York	23rd	William R. Lieberman	Rep./City F.	
Niagara	1st	Fayette E. Pease*	Rep./Law P.	
Niagara	2nd	Harry D. Suitor	Republican	
Oneida	1st	Frank T. Quinn*	Democrat	
Oneida	2nd	Russell G. Dunmore*	Republican	Majority Leader
Oneida	3rd	Fred L. Meiss	Republican	
Onondaga	1st	Horace M. Stone*	Republican	Chairman of Judiciary
Onondaga	2nd	George B. Parsons	Republican	
Onondaga	3rd	Richard B. Smith*	Republican	Chairman of Affairs of Cities
Ontario		Harry R. Marble	Rep./Law P.	
Orange	1st	Lee B. Mailler	Republican	
Orange	2nd	Rainey S. Taylor*	Republican	
Orleans		John S. Thompson*	Republican	Chairman of Public Service
Oswego		Victor C. Lewis*	Republican	Chairman of Public Health
Otsego		Frank M. Smith*	Republican	Chairman of Agriculture
Putnam		D. Mallory Stephens*	Republican	Chairman of Banks
Queens	1st	Harold J. Crawford*	Dem./Rec.	
Queens	2nd	George F. Torsney*	Dem./Rec./ICL	
Queens	3rd	Peter T. Farrell*	Dem./Rec.	
Queens	4th	Jay E. Rice	Rep./City F.	
Queens	5th	Maurice A. FitzGerald*	Dem./Rec./ICL	
Queens	6th	Frederick L. Zimmerman*	Dem./Rec./ICL	
Rensselaer	1st	Michael F. Breen*	Democrat	
Rensselaer	2nd	Maurice Whitney*	Republican	Chairman of Commerce and Navigation
Richmond	1st	W. Irving Lewis	Rep./City F.	
Richmond	2nd	Sidney Jacobi	Rep./City F.	
Rockland		Laurens M. Hamilton	Republican	
St. Lawrence	1st	W. Allan Newell*	Republican	
St. Lawrence	2nd	Walter L. Pratt*	Republican	Chairman of Taxation; died on April 3, 1934
St. Lawrence	2nd	Warren O. Daniels	Republican	elected on July 5 to fill vacancy
Saratoga		William E. Morris	Republican	
Schenectady	1st	Oswald D. Heck*	Rep./Law P.	
Schenectady	2nd	Harold Armstrong	Republican	
Schoharie		William S. Dunn*	Dem./Soc.	
Schuyler		Edward K. Corwin*	Republican	
Seneca		James D. Pollard*	Republican	Chairman of Canals
Steuben	1st	Wilson Messer*	Republican	Chairman of Labor and Industry
Steuben	2nd	J. Austin Otto*	Republican	
Suffolk	1st	John G. Downs*	Republican	Chairman of Printed and Engrossed Bills
Suffolk	2nd	Hamilton F. Potter*	Republican	Chairman of Pensions
Sullivan		J. Maxwell Knapp	Republican	
Tioga		Frank G. Miller*	Rep./Law P.	
Tompkins		James R. Robinson*	Republican	Chairman of Codes
Ulster		J. Edward Conway*	Republican	
Warren		Harry A. Reoux*	Republican	
Washington		Herbert A. Bartholomew*	Republican	Chairman of Internal Affairs
Wayne		Harry L. Averill*	Rep./Law P.	
Westchester	1st	Herbert R. Smith*	Republican	
Westchester	2nd	Ralph A. Gamble*	Republican	
Westchester	3rd	Hugh A. Lavery	Democrat	
Westchester	4th	Alexander H. Garnjost*	Republican	Chairman of Insurance
Westchester	5th	William F. Condon*	Republican	
Wyoming		Harold C. Ostertag*	Rep./Law P.	
Yates		Fred S. Hollowell*	Republican	

=== Employees ===
- Clerk: Fred W. Hammond

== Sources ==
- Members of the New York Senate (1930s) at Political Graveyard
- Members of the New York Assembly (1930s) at Political Graveyard
- McGinnies Gives Post To Friend of Macy in the Syracuse Journal, of Syracuse, on January 15, 1934
