= John F. Killgrew =

American politician

John F. Killgrew (September 11, 1894 – January 8, 1968) was an American politician from New York.

== Life ==
He was born on September 11, 1894, in Manhattan, New York City. He attended Public School No. 51 and DeWitt Clinton High School. During World War I he served in the U.S. Navy, attaining the rank of lieutenant. After the war he joined the merchant marine.

Killgrew was a member of the New York State Assembly (New York Co., 5th D.) in 1931, 1932, 1933, 1934, 1935, 1936, 1937 and 1938; and was Majority Leader in 1935. In 1938, he ran for re-nomination, but was defeated in the Democratic primary by Owen McGivern.

During World War II Killgrew, with the rank of lieutenant commander, was the regional enrolling director for New York of the United States Maritime Service.

In 1946, he ran for Congress in the 30th District, but was defeated by Republican Jay Le Fevre.

He died on January 8, 1968, at his home in Greenwood Lake, Orange County, New York.

== Sources ==
New York State Assembly
Preceded by Frank A. Carlin	New York State Assembly; New York County, 5th District; 1931–1938	Succeeded by Owen McGivern
Political offices
Preceded by Russell G. Dunmore	Majority Leader of the New York State Assembly; 1935	Succeeded by Oswald D. Heck
