= J. Maxwell Knapp =

American lawyer and politician

J. Maxwell Knapp (December 20, 1888 – September 13, 1953) was an American lawyer and politician from New York.

== Life ==
Knapp was born on December 20, 1888, in Hurleyville, New York, the son of John H. Knapp and Annette Burton. His father pioneered the summer hotel business in Hurleyville and developed the Columbia House.

Knapp attended the district schools and graduated from Monticello High School in 1908. He taught school at Divine Corners between 1909 and 1910, and from 1911 to 1912 he helped his family run the Columbia boarding house. In 1913, he began studying at Albany Law School. He graduated from there in 1917. He was admitted to the bar later that year, having previously clerked for one-time district attorney Ellsworth Baker. In 1918, he was elected Fallsburg town justice of the peace. He then served as county clerk from 1920 to 1922, after which he returned to his law practice. He was associated for several years with Justice Deckelman and Al Decker, and he had offices in Liberty.

In 1924, Knapp was elected to the New York State Assembly as a Republican, representing Sullivan County. He served in the Assembly in 1925, 1926, 1929, 1930, 1934, 1935, and 1936. He was also elected special county judge in 1927. In his 1928 campaign for the Assembly, he became the first political candidate in Sullivan County to campaign in an airplane, the plane being flown over the county for two hours while he dropped political literature. In 1937, he was appointed assistant county clerk. He held that office until April 1953, when County Clerk Emil Motl died and Knapp was appointed his successor. A month later, he suffered a stroke and was confined to a hospital in Monticello until a few weeks before his death. On the advice of his doctors, he withdrew as a candidate for clerk and resigned as clerk on September 4, nine days before his death.

Knapp was a Master of the local Freemason lodge and a member of the Sullivan County Bar Association. He attended the Hurleyville Methodist Church, where he was the organist for 35 years. In 1915, he married Helen L. Pierce. Their children were John H., Burton D., and James B.

Knapp died at home following a three-month illness on September 13, 1953. He was buried in Hurleyville Cemetery.

New York State Assembly
Preceded by Guernsey T. Cross	New York State Assembly; Sullivan County; 1925 –1926	Succeeded by Guernsey T. Cross
Preceded by Guernsey T. Cross	New York State Assembly; Sullivan County; 1929–1930	Succeeded by William Whittaker
Preceded by John T. Curtis	New York State Assembly; Sullivan County; 1934–1936	Succeeded by Otto Hillig
