= Bernard Austin (politician) =

American lawyer, accountant and politician

Member of the New York State Assembly from the 4th district
- In office 1939–1959
- Preceded by: George E. Dennen
- Succeeded by: Harold W. Cohn

Personal details
- Born: c. 1896
- Died: January 6, 1959 (aged 62–63) Brooklyn, New York, U.S.

Military service
- Branch/service: United States Army
- Battles/wars: World War I

Bernard Austin (c. 1896 – January 6, 1959) was an American lawyer, accountant and politician who served as a member of the New York State Assembly from the 4th district.

== Background ==
He was born about 1896. During World War I, he served in the United States Army. After the war ended, he became an accountant and lawyer.

He was a member of the New York State Assembly (Kings Co., 4th D.) from 1935 until his death in 1959, sitting in the 158th, 159th, 160th, 161st, 162nd, 163rd, 164th, 165th, 166th, 167th, 168th, 169th, 170th and 171st New York State Legislatures. In November 1958, he was re-elected, but died on the eve of the opening session of the 172nd New York State Legislature.

On January 6, 1959, he attended the inauguration of City Court Justice Louis B. Heller at the court building in Brooklyn, and after saying a few words dropped dead from a heart attack.

== Sources ==
New York State Assembly
Preceded by George E. Dennen	New York State Assembly; Kings County, 4th District; 1935–1959	Succeeded by Harold W. Cohn
