= Stephen J. Wojtkowiak =

American politician

Stephen J. Wojtkowiak (July 20, 1895 – April 6, 1945) was an American politician from New York.

== Life ==
He was born on July 20, 1895, in Buffalo, New York, the son of Jacob Wojtkowiak and Anna (Lukowska) Wojtkowiak. His family was Polish. During World War I he served with the United States Marine Corps in France, and was wounded in action. Afterwards he engaged in the real estate business.

Wojtkowiak was a member of the New York State Senate from 1929 until his death in 1945, sitting in the 152nd, 153rd, 154th, 155th, 156th, 157th, 158th, 159th, 160th, 161st, 162nd, 163rd, 164th and 165th New York State Legislatures.

He died on April 6, 1945, at his home in Buffalo, New York, after an illness of a year.

== Sources ==
New York State Senate
Preceded by Leonard R. Lipowicz	New York State Senate; 49th District; 1929–1944	Succeeded by Austin W. Erwin
Preceded by new district	New York State Senate; 54th District; 1945	Succeeded by Edmund P. Radwan
