= Horace M. Stone =

American politician

Horace Morton Stone (January 6, 1890 – March 7, 1944) was an American lawyer and politician from New York.

== Life ==
He was born on January 6, 1890, in Marcellus, Onondaga County, New York, the son of Rollin McKays Stone (1849–1942) and Mary Adelle (Baker) Stone (1850–1920). He attended Marcellus High School and Solvay High School. He graduated LL.B. from Syracuse University College of Law in 1912. On June 14, 1916, he married Norma L. Walsh (1895–1981), and they had four children.

Stone was Supervisor of the Town of Marcellus from 1915 to 1922. He was a member of the New York State Assembly (Onondaga Co., 1st D.) in 1923, 1924, 1925, 1926, 1927, 1928, 1929, 1930, 1931, 1932, 1933, 1934, 1935 and 1936; and was Chairman of the Committee on Re-Apportionment in 1926, of the Committee on Insurance from 1927 to 1932, and of the Committee on the Judiciary in 1933, 1934 and 1936. In November 1936, he ran for the State Senate, but was defeated by Democrat Francis L. McElroy.

He died on March 7, 1944, while speaking at a Republican Party meeting at the Hotel Syracuse, in Syracuse, New York; and was buried at the Highland Cemetery in Marcellus.

== Sources ==
New York State Assembly
Preceded by Manuel J. Soule	New York State Assembly; Onondaga County, 1st District; 1923–1936	Succeeded by Leo W. Breed
