= Stephen J. Jarema =

American politician

Stephen J. Jarema (c. 1905–1988) was a Ukrainian-American lawyer and New York State Assemblyman. He served the 8th District of Manhattan (now the 61st District) from 1936 to 1944. He served as the executive director of the Ukrainian Congress Committee of America in 1956. In 1980, Pope John Paul II made him a knight of the Order of St. Gregory the Great. He died at his home in Manhattan in 1988.

New York State Assembly
Preceded by Joseph Hamerman	New York State Assembly; New York County, 8th District; 1936–1944	Succeeded by Archibald H. Douglas, Jr.
