= Henry L. O'Brien =

American politician

Henry L. O'Brien (c. 1869 – February 8, 1935) was an American politician from New York.

== Life ==
He was born in Brooklyn, Kings County, New York, the son of Keran O'Brien and Florinda O'Brien. He engaged in the real estate and insurance business.

O'Brien was elected on January 9, 1930, to the New York State Senate (9th D.) to fill the vacancy caused by the resignation of Charles E. Russell. The State Board of Canvassers rejected a contest by his defeated Republican opponent William Koch, and certified O'Brien's election on January 20. He took his seat the same day, and remained in the State Senate until his death in 1935, sitting in the 153rd, 154th, 155th, 156th, 157th and 158th New York State Legislatures.

He died on February 8, 1935, at the home of his niece at 120 Pierrepont Street in Brooklyn, after an illness of six months.

== Sources ==
New York State Senate
Preceded by Charles E. Russell	New York State Senate; 9th District; 1930–1935	Succeeded by Jacob H. Livingston
