= Henry I. Patrie =

American politician

Henry I. Patrie (February 12, 1874 – March 3, 1935) was an American businessman and politician from New York.

== Life ==
He was born on February 12, 1874, in Livingston, Columbia County, New York, the son of John H. Patrie and Marietta Gardner Patrie. He attended the public school and graduated from Albany Business College in 1894. The same year he went to Dolgeville, in Herkimer County, and worked for Alfred Dolge until 1898.

On August 17, 1898, he married Jennie A. Timmerman. Patrie was Manager of the Dolgeville Electric Light and Power Company from 1898 to 1905, and during this time was also appointed as Receiver of the Dolgeville Telephone Company and the Dolgeville Savings Building and Loan Association. In 1905, he began to work for the Dolgeville Felt Shoe Company, and became Secretary and Treasurer of this company in 1907. Later he was also Vice President of the First National Bank of Dolgeville, and a director of several other companies. He was at times a Trustee, and President, of the Village of Dolgeville.

Patrie was a member of the New York State Senate (35th D.) from 1929 until his death in 1935, sitting in the 152nd, 153rd, 154th, 155th, 156th, 157th and 158th New York State Legislatures. He was an alternate delegate to the 1928 Republican National Convention, and a delegate to the 1932 Republican National Convention.

He died on March 3, 1935, at his home at 71 South Main Street in Dolgeville, New York, of angina pectoris.

== Sources ==
- SENATOR PATRIE DIES SUDDENLY in the Black River Democrat, of Lowville, on March 7, 1935

New York State Senate
Preceded by Jeremiah Keck	New York State Senate; 35th District; 1929–1935	Succeeded by Harry F. Dunkel
