= John T. McCall =

American politician

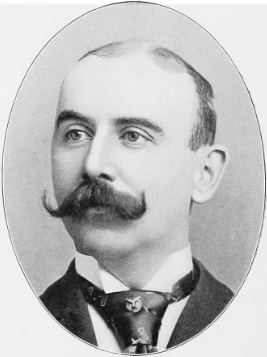

Member of the New York State Senate
- In office 1931–1940
- Constituency: 18th District
- In office 1907–1908
- Constituency: 16th District

Personal details
- Born: August 25, 1863 New York, New York, US
- Died: February 13, 1950 (aged 86) Middlehope, New York, US

John T. McCall (August 25, 1863 – February 13, 1950) was an American politician from New York.

== Life ==
He was born on August 25, 1863, in New York City.

He was an Alderman of New York City from 1898 to 1906; and in May 1903 was elected Chairman of the Committee on Finance.

McCall was a member of the New York State Senate (16th D.) in 1907 and 1908. In 1908, he was denied a re-nomination by Tammany Hall, and Assemblyman Robert F. Wagner was nominated for the seat instead.

McCall was again a member of the State Senate (18th D.) from 1931 to 1940, sitting in the 154th, 155th, 156th, 157th, 158th, 159th, 160th, 161st and 162nd New York State Legislatures.

He was a delegate to the New York State Constitutional Convention of 1938; and an alternate delegate to the 1940 Democratic National Convention.

He died at his home in Middlehope, New York on February 13, 1950.

== Sources ==
New York State Senate
Preceded by John M. Quinn	New York State Senate; 16th District; 1907–1908	Succeeded by Robert F. Wagner
Preceded by Martin J. Kennedy	New York State Senate; 18th District; 1931–1940	Succeeded by Charles Muzzicato
