= FBI Ten Most Wanted Fugitives, 1950s =

In the 1950s, the United States FBI began to maintain a public list of the people it regarded as the Ten Most Wanted Fugitives. Following is a brief review of FBI people and events that place the 1950s decade in context, and then an historical list of individual fugitives whose names first appeared on the 10 Most Wanted list during the decade of the 1950s, under FBI Director J. Edgar Hoover.

== FBI headlines in decade of 1950s ==
In late 1949 the FBI helped publish an article about the "toughest guys" the Bureau was after, who remained fugitives from justice. The positive publicity from the story resulted in the birth of the FBI's "Ten Most Wanted Fugitives" list on March 14, 1950.

Cases of espionage against the United States and its allies were some of the prevalent investigations by the Bureau during the 1950s. Eight Nazi agents who had planned sabotage operations against American targets were arrested. Organized crime networks and families in the United States also became targets, including those headed by Sam Giancana and John Gotti.

== FBI "Ten Most Wanted Fugitives" in the 1950s ==
As wanted fugitives were added, and then later removed, the FBI began to keep track of the sequence number in which each fugitive appeared on the list. Some individuals have even appeared twice, and often a sequence number was permanently assigned to an individual fugitive who was soon caught, captured, or simply removed, before his or her appearance could be published on the publicly released list. In those cases, the public would see only gaps in the number sequence reported by the FBI. For convenient reference, the wanted fugitive's sequence number and date of entry on the FBI list appear below, whenever possible.

== FBI Ten Most Wanted Fugitives added during the 1950s ==
The most wanted fugitives listed in the decade of the 1950s include (in FBI list appearance sequence order):

=== 1950 ===
| Name | Sequence Number | Date of Entry | Time Listed |
|---|---|---|---|
| Thomas James Holden | #1 | March 14, 1950 | One year |
Thomas James Holden, a longtime criminal, was the first fugitive to be placed on the FBI's newly created “Ten Most Wanted Fugitives” list, on March 14, 1950. Holden was arrested on June 23, 1951, in Beaverton, Oregon, following a tip from a citizen who read a wire service story in the Portland, Oregon newspaper The Oregonian and contacted the FBI. He was wanted for fleeing on November 4, 1949, after he had shot and killed his wife and her two brothers while drinking on June 5, 1949, in Chicago. He was previously convicted of robbing a mail train in the late 1920s as part of the Holden-Keating gang and escaped from Leavenworth in 1930. He was alleged to be one of the "outside" crew in a sensational armed break of other prisoners from Leavenworth in December, 1931; after escape, he was caught by Special Agents and local police officers on a Kansas City, Missouri golf course on July 7, 1932. He was released from Leavenworth Prison on November 28, 1947.
| Morley Vernon King | #2 | March 15, 1950 | Two years |
Morley Vernon King was wanted for strangling his wife, Helen, with a scarf and leaving her body in a closet for six days. He then put her body in a steamer trunk, placing it under the back porch of a motel where he worked at in San Luis Obispo, California, on July 9, 1947. He had fled from police on July 8, 1947, and was apprehended on October 31, 1951, in a Philadelphia, Pennsylvania restaurant due to an FBI investigation.
| William Raymond Nesbit | #3 | March 16, 1950 | Two days |
William Nesbit was wanted for multiple murders and jewel thefts. In 1936, Nesbit and a crew of jewel thieves, consisting of three other men and one of their girlfriends, fled to South Dakota, where the members of the crew got into a fight. The girlfriend attempted to break up the fight, but was struck with a hammer by Nesbit and shot by another crew member. She was dragged to a powder house, where another crew member, Harold Baker, laid unconscious. Nesbit then lit a fuse, setting off 3,500 pounds of dynamite and 7,000 pounds of black powder, killing Baker while the girlfriend managed to crawl away. On February 26, 1937, he was arrested in Oklahoma City, Oklahoma. He received a sentence of life in prison, but after 20 years, he was allowed to leave the prison for work activities. However, on September 4, 1946, he never returned and was wanted for fleeing. He was arrested in St. Paul, Minnesota on March 18, 1950, by local police following a wire service story in the St. Paul Dispatch, with the help of a 14-year-old boy and his friends who said he had become friends with a man named "Ray" who lived in a cave in the nearby Mississippi River bank.
| Henry Randolph Mitchell | #4 | March 17, 1950 | Eight years |
Henry Randolph Mitchell, a longtime criminal, was wanted for robbing a Federal Deposit Insurance Corporation bank in Williston, Florida on January 21, 1948, shortly after being released from Florida State Penitentiary. His criminal career dated back to 1924 and he had been previously convicted in the states of Kentucky, Georgia, New York and Florida for crimes including grand larceny, violation of narcotics laws, breaking and entering, and forgery. Mitchell was placed on the list three days after its inception and was the only one of the original members still at large when the process against him was dismissed in Tallahassee, Florida on July 18, 1958.
| Omar August Pinson | #5 | March 18, 1950 | Five months |
Omar August Pinson was wanted for murder and burglary. On April 25, 1947, Pinson, after just finishing a burglary, was approached by a state officer when he saw he was holding a large amount of guns. After failing to come up with an excuse, he pulled out a pistol, then shot and killed the officer. He had apparently been on a six-month burglary spree throughout Washington, Idaho, and Oregon. He was convicted for the murder and burglaries, and attempted to escape prison multiple times thereafter. On May 30, 1949, he managed to saw through his prison bars and escape with another inmate, then immediately went back to burglarizing homes. He was arrested in Pierre, South Dakota on August 28, 1950, by local police while applying for his driver's license.
| Lee Emory Downs | #6 | March 20, 1950 | One month |
Lee Emory Downs, an expert safecracker and longtime criminal, was wanted for robbing a telephone company in San Jose, California with an accomplice. He was a part of a loose gang of holdup men and robbers from several states. He was arrested by the FBI in Daytona Beach, Florida, on April 7, 1950, outside his trailer home. At the time of the arrest, Downs was working on his 1949 Lincoln automobile. A search of the trailer revealed two pistols, six rifles, nine sticks of dynamite, twelve electric detonating fuses, and two leather briefcases filled with ammunition. He was convicted, but in 1968, while on parole, he attempted to burglarize the Colombian consulate in San Francisco and was returned to prison.
| Orba Elmer Jackson | #7 | March 21, 1950 | Two days |
Orba Elmer Jackson, a longtime criminal, was wanted for escaping prison when he walked away from a work duty. He was serving time for robbing a store that happened to have a post office in the back, making it a federal crime, therefore making him a federal prisoner. He was sent to Leavenworth Prison. He was apprehended without incident in Aloha, Oregon on March 23, 1950. A citizen saw Jackson's Identification Order in an Oregon post office and recognized him as a farm hand.
| Glen Roy Wright | #8 | March 22, 1950 | Nine months |
Glen Roy Wright, a longtime criminal and dubbed, "The Old Man of the Mountains", was wanted for escaping prison, where he was serving a life sentence for hijacking an auction with an accomplice. He was captured by accident when the FBI were looking for two kidnappers of a St. Paul banker. He was also wanted for questioning in the murder of a Tulsa attorney. After an escape attempt in 1940 where he was wounded, on September 14, 1948, he was able to successfully escape when he faked having an ill mother and disappeared when visiting her. While on the run, he committed numerous crimes, including robbery. He was arrested by the FBI in Salina, Kansas on December 13, 1950. He then became a model prisoner before dying of a heart attack in prison on July 5, 1954.
| Henry Harland Shelton | #9 | March 23, 1950 | Three months |
Henry Harland Shelton was wanted for escaping prison. On September 17, 1949, Shelton and an accomplice kidnapped an electrical worker and forced him to drive them across several states at knifepoint. They then abandoned the car and repeated the process three more times. Shelton's accomplice was captured during a holdup while Shelton managed to escape the police. Three months later, the FBI were able to ascertain his location as he frequented a local bar. He was arrested in Indianapolis, Indiana on June 23, 1950, by FBI agents; Shelton drew a .45 caliber automatic weapon during the arrest in an attempt to shoot the arresting FBI agent, but the agents shot and wounded him. He pled guilty to charges of federal kidnapping and interstate transportation of stolen motor vehicles. He received a sentence of 45 years on the kidnapping charge and five years on the car theft charge, with the sentences to run concurrently.
| Morris Guralnick | #10 | March 24, 1950 | Nine months |
Morris Guralnick was wanted for escaping custody while awaiting trial for stabbing his ex-girlfriend in April 1948. In order to escape, Guralnick and four other inmates broke the plumbing fixtures and violently assaulted two guards with broken pipes. One guard was hospitalized with severe head injuries. Guralnick was considered extremely dangerous, as during his first arrest for the assault, he bit off the finger of an arresting officer. In December 1950, Guralnick was arrested by an FBI agent and a local police officer at a clothing store where he was working as a night clerk in Madison, Wisconsin. He was located as a result of a citizen seeing his picture in the Coronet magazine and then contacting authorities.
| Willie Sutton | #11 | March 20, 1950 | Two years |
William Francis Sutton, a.k.a. “The Actor” or “Slick Willie,” was wanted for escaping prison where he was serving time for multiple bank robberies. He was considered a gentleman when robbing banks, with one victim stating that it was like being in a movie where the usher had a gun. He would usually put on elaborate disguises in order to rob banks in broad daylight. He would go on to make several escapes from prisons. While serving a sentence of life imprisonment as a fourth-time offender, Sutton was transferred to the Philadelphia County Prison, in Homesburg, Pennsylvania. On February 10, 1947, Sutton and other prisoners dressed as prison guards and carried two ladders across the prison yard to the wall after dark. When the prison's searchlights hit him, Sutton yelled, “It's okay,” and no one stopped him. Because of his love for expensive clothes, his photograph was given to tailors as well as the police. Arnold Schuster recognized Sutton on a New York subway on February 18, 1952, leading to his arrest. He was sentenced to 30 years on top of the one life sentence and 105 years he was already serving before his escape. In 1969, he was released from prison since he had emphysema and was preparing for major surgery. On November 2, 1980, Willie Sutton died in Spring Hill, Florida, at the age of 79.
| Stephen William Davenport | #12 | April 4, 1950 | One month |
Stephen William Davenport, a longtime criminal, was wanted for fleeing after he was arrested for stealing a car while out on parole. He was originally in Leavenworth Prison for killing a detective sergeant while committing an armed burglary. To escape, he broke a bar in the shower room of the correctional facility he was at and using blankets slid out a window to the ground floor. He was arrested in Las Vegas, Nevada, by local police, due to an FBI investigation.
| Henry Clay Tollett | #13 | April 11, 1950 | One year |
Henry Clay Tollett, a longtime criminal, was wanted for escaping prison where he was serving a 25 year long sentence for bank robbery. He hid in a truck that was picking up prison-made office furniture before jumping out of the truck and disappearing in Tacoma, Washington. He was known to have a gun in a secret pocket in his left sleeve and was a notorious alcoholic. He was fatally wounded by a California Highway Patrol officer during the attempt to apprehend him on June 4, 1951. He was in a stolen car in Redding, California.
| Frederick J. Tenuto | #14 | May 24, 1950 | Fourteen years |
Frederick J. Tenuto, a.k.a. "The Angel of Death”, and longtime criminal, was wanted for escaping prison with Willie Sutton (#11) in 1947, where he was serving time for murder. Placed on the Top Ten list on May 24, 1950, the federal process against Tenuto was dismissed in Philadelphia, Pennsylvania, by a U.S. District Judge. It was alleged by Joe Valachi that Tenuto was killed by Albert Anastasia to get rid of loose ends in a hit he ordered on Arnold Schuster.
| Thomas Kling | #15 | July 17, 1950 | Two years |
Thomas Kling, a longtime criminal, was wanted for armed robbery when he entered a bar and fired a gun in the air. He then smashed a barkeeper over the head with a stool and robbed the place. All this took place while he was out on parole. Starting his criminal career at the age of ten, he was in and out of prison for a multitude of crimes, including multiple robberies, assaults, bank robberies, breaking and entering, carjacking, and more. He was arrested in New York, New York on February 20, 1952, by local police after following an address book they found in Willie Sutton's (#11) apartment.
| Meyer Dembin | #16 | September 5, 1950 | One year |
Meyer Dembin was wanted for robbing a bank with three others in under five minutes, armed with revolvers and a shotgun. They then jumped into a stolen sedan. Over the course of the next decade, his accomplices would be arrested and given lengthy prison sentences. He surrendered to the U.S. Attorney in New York City on November 26, 1951.

=== 1951 ===
| Name | Sequence Number | Date of Entry | Time Listed |
|---|---|---|---|
| Courtney Townshend Taylor | #17 | January 8, 1951 | One month |
Courtney Townshend Taylor was wanted for passing bad checks. He was apprehended in Mobile, Alabama in 1951 after a jeweler recognized him from a wanted flyer. Sending his clerk to follow Taylor, the jeweler called the FBI and police. Within 25 minutes, Taylor was in custody. Upon his arrest, he was frisked and pulled out a black fountain pen and stated, "This is the only gun I need".
| Joseph Franklin Bent | #18 | January 9, 1951 | Two years |
Joseph Franklin Bent, a longtime criminal and former army soldier, was wanted for multiple robberies and attempted murder. On July 23, 1949, he wrapped his face in tape and robbed a grocery store in San Diego, California. After fleeing in a getaway car driven by an accomplice, they were chased by a motorcycle officer. A shootout ensued where Bent shot at the officer with a shotgun out of the moving car where they managed to get away. While on the run, in May 1950, he robbed another grocery store in Baton Rouge, Louisiana and was arrested after hiding under a house. He managed to escape from the infirmary with a broken jaw and stole two vehicles in succession to escape. He then fled to Riverdale, North Dakota and committed another robbery. He was arrested in Texas City, Texas, after a citizen recognized his photo in Pageant magazine. He was shot and wounded during the arrest when he attempted to draw his weapon.
| Harry H. Burton | #19 | March 9, 1951 | One year |
Harry H. Burton, a longtime criminal, was wanted for murder. On October 1, 1947, a wealthy liquor store owner who was reported to have large sums of cash on him and in his home was robbed while his wife and three visitors were inside. A mailman arrived with a package at the front door and drew a pistol, forcing the wife inside and having all four people lie face down on the kitchen floor. Others then entered and ransacked the home. Robert Crane adjusted himself while lying down and was subsequently shot in the head by the intruder leading to them fleeing the home. The package initially used to gain entry to the home was left behind, which had the latent fingerprints of Burton, and stuffed inside the package was a sticker with Burton's father's name and address. Further investigation turned up evidence that implicated Burton. He was arrested in Cody, Wyoming, in 1952, by the local sheriff and the FBI. His arrest is attributed to the True Detective Mysteries radio broadcast. Burton was later acquitted when a witness testified that he was at his dying mother's bedside at the time of the murder.
| Joseph Paul Cato | #20 | June 27, 1951 | Surrendered before publication |
Joseph Paul Cato, a one-time gangster, was wanted for the murder of his girlfriend who he was having an affair with unbeknownst to her husband. The motive was believed to be jealousy as she was meeting another man. He broke down her door, chased her upstairs, and shot her in the head. He surrendered to the FBI in Cleveland, Ohio, in June 1951, after seeing his own Identification Order. Although approved to be placed on the “Top Ten” list, he surrendered prior to the press release date.
| Anthony Brancato | #21 | June 27, 1951 | Two days |
Anthony Brancato was wanted for robbing the Flamingo Hotel and Resort in Las Vegas, Nevada, which had ties to the Mafia, alongside Tony Trombino as part of duo robbers commonly known as "The Two Tonys". He surrendered to the FBI in San Francisco, California on June 29, 1951, after seeing an International News Service story in the San Francisco Call-Bulletin.
| Frederick Emerson Peters | #22 | July 2, 1951 | Seven months |
Frederick Emerson Peters, a serial imposter, was wanted for writing bad checks. He would travel around the U.S. pretending to be government officials and relatives of famous people, getting others to cash bad checks for him. He amassed around 130 aliases by 1948. He was arrested on January 15, 1952, in a Washington, D.C., hotel lobby after two FBI agents recognized him from an Identification Order.
| Ernest Tait | #23 | July 11, 1951 | One day |
Ernest Tait, a career robber, was wanted for robbing a safe in New Castle, Indiana with an accomplice. They were caught in the act and had a shootout with police where his partner was shot and killed. He was arrested on July 12, 1951, in Miami, Florida, by the FBI as a direct result of an Associated Press story published in the Miami Herald and the Miami Daily News. After being apprehended, Tait said he had intended to shoot it out with the police, but he had read the AP story about himself stating he had been added to the “Top Ten” list and decided not to try to shoot it out with the FBI. Tait is also #133 on the list.
| Ollie Gene Embry | #24 | July 25, 1951 | One month |
Ollie Gene Embry was wanted for robbing the Monroe National Bank in Columbia, Illinois with three others on February 7, 1951. The four planned to meet up later to divide the stolen cash but Embry spotted a detective during the sting operation set up to capture them and Embry fled while his accomplices were arrested. A citizen saw Embry's Identification Order in the post office and recognized him as a local filling station attendant. He was arrested by FBI agents in August 1951 while he was in the process of fixing the radiator of the arresting agents’ car in Kansas City, Missouri.
| Giachino Anthony Baccolla | #25 | August 20, 1951 | Four months |
Giachino Anthony Baccolla was wanted for the murder of a Detroit jeweler that was shot in his car at his home on May 17, 1951. The jeweler and Baccolla were acquaintances as former criminals. It is possible that he killed him after the jeweler became a government witness in a robbery case in 1950. He was arrested in New York, New York in December 1951, due to an FBI investigation.
| Raymond Edward Young | #26 | November 12, 1951 | Four days |
Raymond Edward Young, a longtime robber, was wanted for escaping a California prison when he ran away from fighting a fire as part of a convict gang of firefighters. While on the run, he got married and got a job escorting funeral processions on a motorcycle, making friends with local motorcycle cops. He was arrested in Denver, Colorado, in November 1951, due to an FBI investigation. Young worked nights at a bakery and was apprehended while loading bread trucks.
| John Thomas Hill | #27 | December 10, 1951 | One year |
John Thomas Hill was wanted for murder. With a history of vicious assaults, he and five others beat a store owner to death. He also got into an argument with his wife where he stabbed her five times in the head and chest with an ice pick. He was arrested in Hamtramck, Michigan, in August 1952, after a citizen recognized him from a Wanted Flyer. Due to an FBI investigation, agents raided his home finding Hill in bed, fast asleep. He offered no resistance.
| George Arthur Heroux | #28 | December 19, 1951 | Seven months |
George Arthur Heroux was wanted for robbing the Johnson County National Bank and Trust Company in Prairie Village, Kansas with machine guns alongside Gerhard Arthur Puff (#30) on November 23, 1951. He was arrested in El Portal, Florida on July 25, 1952, by local police following a police department investigation.

=== 1952 ===
| Name | Sequence Number | Date of Entry | Time Listed |
|---|---|---|---|
| Sydney Gordon Martin | #29 | January 7, 1952 | Two years |
Sydney Gordon Martin was wanted for robbing, shooting, and beating a farmer with a rock near Belchertown, Massachusetts when he faked needing help with his stalled car. He then fled in the farmer's truck before being arrested in Northampton, Massachusetts. Four months later he scaled a barbed wire fence and escaped jail. He was arrested without incident in Corpus Christi, Texas on November 27, 1953, by the FBI following publicity in the Saturday Evening Post.
| Gerhard Arthur Puff | #30 | January 28, 1952 | Six months |
Gerhard Arthur Puff, a longtime criminal, was wanted for robbing the Johnson County National Bank and Trust Company of Prairie Village, Kansas, alongside George Arthur Heroux (#28) at gun point. He and Heroux had met in jail while Puff awaited trial for armed robbery. On July 26, 1952, Puff was arrested in a hotel lobby in New York, New York, after he shot and killed FBI Special Agent Joseph J. Brock. Puff himself was shot and wounded before he was arrested. He was executed by electrocution by federal authorities in New York on August 12, 1954.
| Thomas Edward Young | #31 | February 21, 1952 | Seven months |
Thomas Edward Young, a longtime criminal and jail escape artist, had fled while out on bond for burglary. He then met up with his wife who was recovering from a car accident. They then both went on the run through several states. Later, a friend of Thomas was getting out of jail, so they picked him up with another couple. They were stopped by federal agents where Thomas tried to run, armed with a pistol. They were all subsequently arrested. On August 18, 1951, Thomas overpowered a guard, stole his keys, released his wife and another prisoner, and fled. During their time on the run, they committed multiple burglaries and robberies. They were later arrested and entered guilty pleas in October 1951. Then on December 28, 1951, Thomas and his wife escaped custody again and fled, committing multiple burglaries and five bank robberies. He was arrested in the Boise National Forest on September 23, 1952, without incident following an investigation of citizen reports recognizing his photograph on Identification Orders and in newspaper articles.
| Kenneth Lee Maurer | #32 | February 27, 1952 | Eleven months |
Kenneth Lee Maurer was wanted for the murders of his mother and 11-year-old sister. The mother was stabbed 36 times and bludgeoned while the sister was stabbed four times. A bloody axe and hunter's knife were found at the scene. He was arrested while working at a local cabinet shop on January 8, 1953, in Miami, Florida, after several customers saw his published photograph and contacted the FBI. Because of Maurer's fear of flying, he was allowed to return to Detroit by train to face murder charges.
| Isaie Aldy Beausoleil | #33 | March 3, 1952 | One year |
Isaie Aldy Beausoleil was wanted in connection for the bludgeoning death of his female companion, who was found in a ditch. At the time of his arrest on June 25, 1953, Beausoleil was dressed as a woman. The arrest occurred in Chicago, Illinois, when Beausoleil was spotted acting suspiciously in a women's restroom. A park policewoman responded and made the arrest.
| Leonard Joseph Zalutsky | #34 | August 5, 1952 | One month |
Leonard Joseph Zalutsky, a.k.a. "Bad Eye" because he was half blind, was wanted for escaping a Florida prison where he was serving a life sentence for murdering a Miami police officer in 1933. He was arrested by local police in Beaver Falls, Pennsylvania on September 8, 1952, after being recognized by two citizens who saw his FBI Wanted Poster in a post office. Zalutsky was paroled in 1958.
| William Merle Martin | #35 | August 11, 1952 | Three weeks |
William Merle Martin and an accomplice robbed a house in Overland Park, Kansas on June 22, 1952, then attempted to steal a car in a nearby neighborhood just after midnight the next day. At the time deputies had already been in the area searching for the two men. Deputies Willard Carver and Floyd Gaunt, upon going to a call about an attempted car theft, drove down the street saw a vehicle in a ditch which contained a Luger pistol and random items. Martin and his accomplice then approached in a truck. When told to put their hands up, they immediately opened fire, killing deputy Carver. He was arrested in St. Louis, Missouri on August 30, 1952, by local police due to a police investigation. He was executed by hanging in Kansas on July 16, 1954.
| James Eddie Diggs | #36 | August 27, 1952 | Nine years |
James Eddie Diggs was wanted for the shooting murders of his wife and two sons. Five days after the murders, he was in a car that was pulled over with three other men. Instead of identifying himself, he drew a revolver and shot a police officer in the mouth. The four men then drove away, where three of them later surrendered and told police that Diggs had kidnapped them at gunpoint to drive to Hamlet. However, he got out of the car before reaching his destination and stated he was going to "take to the woods" and was never seen again. Federal process against Diggs was dismissed in Norfolk, Virginia in 1961.
| Nick George Montos | #37 | September 8, 1952 | Two years |
Nick George Montos, a criminal since 14-years-old and later a Mafia member, was wanted for escaping prison multiple times where he was serving time for robbery. He had beat a 74-year-old man and the man's sister with a gun with three others. He was arrested in his motel room in Memphis, Tennessee, after being recognized by a citizen. He was also #94 on the list being the first person to be added twice.
| Theodore Richard Byrd Jr. | #38 | September 10, 1952 | Six months |
Theodore Richard Byrd Jr., a Navy deserter and longtime criminal, was wanted for interstate transportation of stolen property. Under a fake name, he set up an account with a fake company called McGee Petroleum Co., hired a local stenographer, and had her write bogus checks as employee payrolls. He then continued the operation in multiple states, under multiple identities. He was arrested in El Reno, Oklahoma on February 21, 1953, after an off-duty FBI clerk recognized him from a Wanted Flyer and notified the local police.
| Harden Collins Kemper | #39 | September 17, 1952 | Four months |
Harden Collins Kemper, a longtime criminal, was wanted for failing to appear for court for vehicle theft. He was the leader for a ring of car thieves that stole 58 vehicles at the time. He was arrested in Glendale, Arizona, after an Arizona Highway Patrolman recognized him from an Identification Order.
| John Joseph Brennan | #40 | October 6, 1952 | Four months |
John Joseph Brennan, a longtime criminal since the age of 15, was wanted for bank robbery where he and multiple accomplices, including Charles Patrick Shue (#41) got into a shootout with Chicago police. He was arrested in Chicago, Illinois on January 23, 1953, as a result of a tip from an FBI informant.

=== 1953 ===
| Name | Sequence Number | Date of Entry | Time Listed |
|---|---|---|---|
| Charles Patrick Shue | #41 | January 15, 1953 | One month |
Charles Patrick Shue was wanted for bank robbery and eluding police alongside John Joseph Brennan (#40). He was arrested in Los Angeles, California on February 13, 1953, as a result of the FBI being notified after an individual recognized his picture in a newspaper.
| Lawson David Shirk Butler | #42 | January 22, 1953 | Three months |
Lawson David Shirk Butler, a long time criminal since the age of 14, was wanted for escaping an Oregon prison while serving a 10-year prison term for assault and armed robbery. He was arrested in Los Angeles, California on April 21, 1953.
| Joseph James Brletic | #43 | February 8, 1953 | Two days |
Joseph James Brletic, a violent criminal, was wanted for escaping jail. On June 12, 1948, he and an accomplice stole a car from Pennsylvania, drove to Missouri and held up a gas station at gunpoint. After a police chase, they were arrested two days later. While awaiting sentencing, Brletic and his companion dug out of the prison using broken barber shears and hopped rides on freight trains. He was arrested in Lancaster, California on February 10, 1953, by the Los Angeles Sheriff's Office after being recognized from a photograph in the Los Angeles Herald-Express newspaper.
| David Dallas Taylor | #44 | March 3, 1953 | Three months |
David Dallas Taylor was wanted for escaping custody. He was serving over 30 years for second degree murder and larceny. On September 1, 1952, while being transported back to an Alabama prison, he escaped for a fourth time by jumping off a moving train while handcuffed. He was arrested in Chicago, Illinois on May 26, 1953, due to an FBI investigation.
| Perlie Miller | #45 | March 4, 1953 | One day |
Perlie Miller was wanted for escaping prison while serving a term for armed robbery. He was arrested in Somersworth, New Hampshire on March 5, 1953. Working at a local diner, a customer recognized him from a published “Top Ten” photograph.
| Fred William Bowerman | #46 | March 5, 1953 | Two months |
Fred William Bowerman was wanted for committing a violent bank robbery where he shot an employee for raising their hands too slowly. On April 24, 1953, while attempting to rob a St. Louis, Missouri bank, he and four accomplices got into a shootout with over 100 police officers. He was mortally wounded and died a week later from his wounds.
| Robert Benton Mathus | #47 | March 16, 1953 | Three days |
Robert Benton Mathus was wanted for the brutal beating and robbery of an elderly man and his sister as a part of a trio of robbers, one of which was Nick George Montos (#37). He was arrested in Duson, Louisiana on March 19, 1953, by FBI agents and local police after being recognized by a citizen who saw his Wanted Flyer.
| Floyd Allen Hill | #48 | March 30, 1953 | Three weeks |
Floyd Allen Hill, a con artist and bank robber, was wanted for escaping prison. He took part in multiple robberies and later buried his share of one heist near Fort Worth, Texas. He was arrested in Dallas, Texas on April 18, 1953, due to an FBI investigation.
| Joseph Levy | #49 | May 1, 1953 | Caught before publication |
Joseph Levy, a longtime con man, was wanted for cashing worthless checks. He was arrested at the Churchill Downs Racetrack in Louisville, Kentucky on April 30, 1953, one day prior to the public announcement of being placed on the “Top Ten” list. FBI agents recognized him from the “Top Ten” material sent to the field office for the announcement. He is still considered to have been officially on the list. He was unable to cash in his prize of $115 from the track.
| Arnold Hinson | #50 | May 4, 1953 | Six months |
Arnold Hinson, a longtime criminal, was wanted for shooting his co-worker in the head four times at a farm he worked at. He and his wife then fled the city in a stolen pick-up truck. He was arrested by FBI agents in the downtown area of Memphis, Tennessee on November 7, 1953.
| Gordon Lee Cooper | #51 | May 11, 1953 | One month |
Gordon Lee Cooper was wanted for escaping custody after being charged with robbery and assault. He beat up a deputy after being arraigned and robbed him of $160 before fleeing. He was arrested in St. Louis, Missouri on June 11, 1953, following an investigation based on a citizen's tip. Cooper was recognized from newspaper publicity.
| Fleet Robert Current | #52 | May 18, 1953 | Two months |
Fleet Robert Current was wanted for multiple robberies. One of his most bold robberies was when he held up a dairy farm company office and held 28 employees at gunpoint with two accomplices. He was arrested on an Omaha, Nebraska, street corner on July 12, 1953, due to an FBI investigation.
| Donald Charles Fitterer | #53 | June 8, 1953 | Two weeks |
Donald Charles Fitterer was wanted for robbery and murder. He and an accomplice had committed a string of robberies and while out drinking one night, a drunk man by the name of Charles Harrison, approached them asking if he could buy them drinks and if either of the men could drive to pick up a woman. The three got in Harrison's car, but instead of driving to Muscatine, Iowa as instructed, Fitterer drove towards Fort Madison. In a back road, Harrison and Fitterer got into an argument about a bottle of whiskey prompting Fitterer to get out of the car and shoot Harrison in the head, before entering the car and shooting him again. He then robbed the man of his watch and cash before he and his accomplice dumped a still alive Harrison, into a gutter. He was arrested in Oakland, California on June 21, 1953, by the FBI and California State Patrol. A citizen had reported him to FBI Headquarters after identifying him from a True Detective Mysteries radio broadcast.
| John Raleigh Cooke | #54 | June 22, 1953 | Four months |
John Raleigh Cooke, a longtime criminal, was wanted for kidnapping and armed robbery. On September 4, 1953, in Chelmsford, Massachusetts, four gunmen entered the home of an elderly man, held him, his housekeeper, and her 4-year-old daughter hostage at gunpoint, while ransacking the home looking for a safe. Three of the gunmen then took the man to a cafe he owned to rob his store safe. The next day, three of the gunmen left for Lowell, Massachusetts and robbed a hotel bar. During the robbery one of the patrons escaped while a gunman's shotgun misfired. They fled back to the Chelmsford home, bound the housekeeper, and fled. Cooke was arrested the same morning for having a concealed weapon and was released on a $1,000 bond. The police then figured out Cooke was one of the four gunmen involved in the kidnapping. He was arrested in Detroit, Michigan on October 20, 1953, as he descended for lunch from a roof on a construction project where he was working as a welder. Upon arrest, Cooke stated it was a relief to be caught as he knew from newspaper articles he was on the FBI's list of “Ten Most Wanted Fugitives” and distance would not aid him in his flight.
| Jack Gordon White | #55 | July 6, 1953 | Two months |
Jack Gordon White, a longtime criminal since the age of 18, was wanted for escaping prison and resuming a string of armed robberies and burglaries. On August 27, 1953, White was recognized by a police officer who remembered him from an Identification Order. The FBI and police were called to the area of downtown Seattle, Washington. After determining the make of the vehicle he was driving, FBI agents were able to locate him. A traffic stop was made, and White was apprehended without incident.
| Alex Richard Bryant | #56 | July 14, 1953 | Seven months |
Alex Richard Bryant, a longtime criminal and convicted rapist, was wanted for escaping prison where he was serving a life term for armed robbery. He threatened to slit the throat of a guard he held hostage in a prison station wagon. He then stripped both the driver and the guard of their belongings and drove away with the car. He was arrested in Los Angeles, California on January 26, 1954, due to an FBI investigation.
| George William Krendich | #57 | July 22, 1953 | Three months |
George William Krendich was wanted for murder. He strangled to death a pregnant woman and weighed her body down before throwing the body into a creek. In October 1953, he was found dead in an abandoned Jeep in a wooded area of Dunn County, North Dakota. The cause of death was suicide from asphyxiation of carbon monoxide fumes, which were piped in from the exhaust into his closed car.
| Lloyd Reed Russell | #58 | September 8, 1953 | One year |
Lloyd Reed Russell, a long time criminal, was wanted for escaping prison. During his first escape, he was serving 3 to 37 years for grand larceny and burglary. He and another inmate scaled a high tension wire, stole a vehicle, ran multiple police barricades and had shootouts with police. During one of the shootouts, he injured a police officer and was sentenced to 10 years. While serving time for the shooting three years later, he and seven other inmates, got a hold of an acetylene torch and other tools, overpowered two guards, and cut through a cell block window. He was killed in a shootout with local police officers in Spokane, Washington on August 3, 1954.
| Edwin Sanford Garrison | #59 | October 26, 1953 | One week |
Edwin Sanford Garrison, a.k.a. the "Human Adding Machine" because of his genius in math, was a longtime criminal and wanted for escaping prison in Alabama where he was serving time for robbery, burglary, larceny, and murder. He and two others had lit a house on fire that killed a 5-year-old girl. He was arrested in Detroit, Michigan in November 1953, without incident after a citizen recognized his photograph in a newspaper article. He was also #112 on the list.
| Franklin James Wilson | #60 | November 2, 1953 | Three months |
Franklin James Wilson, a.k.a. the "Ice Box Bandit", was wanted for armed robbery. He was particularly wanted as leader of a gang of robbers that got into a shootout with police that left an officer dead. During an interview following his arrest in Chicago, Illinois in January 1954, Wilson blamed the extensive publicity surrounding his addition to the “Ten Most Wanted Fugitives” list for his quick capture.
| Charles E. Johnson | #61 | November 12, 1953 | One month |
Charles E. Johnson was wanted for robbing a bank while out on parole, where he and two accomplices then robbed another bank robber. He was arrested in Central Islip, Long Island, New York December 28, 1953, after a citizen recognized him from a magazine article in the November 14, 1953, issue of the Saturday Evening Post.
| Thomas Jackson Massingale | #62 | November 18, 1953 | Eight days |
Thomas Jackson Massingale was wanted for escaping prison where he assaulted two guards and escaped in a stolen vehicle. He was arrested in Las Vegas, New Mexico on November 26, 1953, after a citizen recognized him from a photograph in the November 24, 1953 issue of the Saturday Evening Post.
| Peter Edward Kenzik | #63 | December 7, 1953 | One year |
Peter Edward Kenzik, a longtime criminal since the age of 15, was wanted for stabbing to death his ex-wife and brutally wounding her 75-year-old grandmother. Ironically, 12 years prior, he was convicted of stabbing his first wife and sentenced to 20 years. He had a history of frenzied knife attacks and was also a convicted sex offender. He was arrested in San Diego, California on January 26, 1955, for drunkenness. A gun was found in his possession, and a routine fingerprint check identified Kenzik.
| Thomas Everett Dickerson | #64 | December 10, 1953 | Two weeks |
Thomas Everett Dickerson, a.k.a. the "Tattooed Bandit", was wanted for escaping jail with three other inmates, which included his uncle. He was arrested in Verdunville, West Virginia on December 21, 1953, by the FBI and the West Virginia State Patrol, due to an FBI investigation.

=== 1954 ===
| Name | Sequence Number | Date of Entry | Time Listed |
|---|---|---|---|
| Chester Lee Davenport | #65 | January 6, 1954 | One day |
Chester Lee Davenport was wanted for escaping police custody multiple times while originally under arrest for cattle robbery. He was arrested near Dixon, California on January 7, 1954. The local veterinarian recognized Davenport's photograph in a newspaper as being a dairy farm worker. Davenport was arrested while milking a cow.
| Alex Whitmore | #66 | January 11, 1954 | Four months |
Alex Whitmore was wanted for beating and robbing a hitchhiker with a hatchet. During his attempted robbery, he was stabbed by the victim. He was arrested in Seattle, Washington on May 10, 1954, after a citizen recognized him from a television broadcast.
| Everett Lowell Krueger | #67 | January 25, 1954 | Three weeks |
Everett Lowell Krueger, a long time criminal since the age of 14, was wanted for escaping prison with two others. He was arrested in Las Cruces, New Mexico on February 15, 1954. Krueger told FBI agents, “I’m glad it’s over. I’m tired of running.”
| Apee Hamp Chapman | #68 | February 3, 1954 | One week |
Apee Hamp Chapman was wanted for double homicide. He shot and killed his wife and another woman while at a party in Cleveland. Then, while on the run, he committed multiple robberies. He was arrested in Silver Spring, Maryland on February 10, 1954, after a citizen saw his photo in the February 9, 1954, issue of the Washington-Afro-American magazine.
| Nelson Robert Duncan | #69 | February 8, 1954 | Two weeks |
Nelson Robert Duncan, a longtime criminal since the age of 16, was wanted as a notorious "kingpin" of a car theft ring. He was arrested in Atlanta, Georgia on February 21, 1954. Atlanta patrolmen were investigating an open skylight in a local grocery store and discovered Duncan and an accomplice attempting to burglarize the store safe.
| Charles Falzone | #70 | February 24, 1954 | Two years |
Charles Falzone, a.k.a. "Little Mosco", was wanted for robbing his co-workers at a local boat company at gunpoint as they transferred cash. He then forced them to drive him to Buffalo, New York where he disappeared. He was arrested in New Bedford, Pennsylvania on August 17, 1955, by the FBI after a citizen recognized his photograph from an Identification Order in a post office.
| Basil Kingsley Beck | #71 | March 1, 1954 | Two days |
Basil Kingsley Beck, a longtime criminal since the age of 11, was wanted for escaping jail with three others where he was being held for burglary and larceny. During the breakout, they overpowered the jailer and a deputy, stole their guns, and one of their cars. After stealing a different car, Beck and another inmate got into an argument causing him to leave the group. The rest of the group would later get into a gunfight with police leaving one inmate dead. He was arrested in San Pablo, California on March 3, 1954, by FBI agents, due to an FBI investigation.
| Clarence Dye | #72 | March 8, 1954 | Two years |
Clarence Dye, a longtime criminal, was wanted for armed robbery. He and his partner, Orice Gains, robbed a market then a cafe where Gains shot and killed the owner. Dye then drove Gains home with the body in the trunk which was later recovered after Dye fled. He was arrested in Milwaukee, Wisconsin on August 3, 1955, by local police. During a routine check, Dye's former girlfriend told police Dye was wanted.
| James William Lofton | #73 | March 16, 1954 | One day |
James William Lofton was wanted for escaping prison with 11 other inmates in a mass breakout. He was serving a 25-year sentence for armed robbery and larceny with this being his sixth escape in total. Lofton was arrested in Morgan City, Louisiana on March 17, 1954, by local police and the FBI, due to an FBI investigation.
| Sterling Groom | #74 | April 2, 1954 | Three weeks |
Sterling Groom, a.k.a. "King Kong" because of his large and long arms, was wanted for escaping jail while awaiting charges for robbery where he assaulted a guard. Later he robbed and strangled to death a general store proprietor. He had just gotten out of prison under a conditional release for another murder where he beat a woman to death. He was arrested in Baltimore, Maryland on April 31, 1954, by the FBI after a citizen recognized him from an Identification Order in a post office. Groom was executed by electrocution in Virginia on October 14, 1954.
| Raymond Louis Owen Menard | #75 | May 3, 1954 | Two days |
Raymond Louis Owen Menard and his accomplice wife were wanted as members of a robbery ring where they used baby diapers as masks. They were the last two left in the gang. He was arrested in New Orleans, Louisiana on May 5, 1954, by local police after a citizen recognized his photograph from a local newspaper.
| John Alfred Hopkins | #76 | May 18, 1954 | Three weeks |
John Alfred Hopkins was wanted for escaping prison where he was serving a life sentence for murdering a police officer who caught him burglarizing a drug store. He had used his skills as a mechanic and his job in the prison welding shop to carefully put together an entire Jeep, part by part, from the prison junkyard. He was arrested near Beowawe, Nevada on June 7, 1954, by the FBI after a citizen recognized him from a photo in a California newspaper.
| Otto Austin Loel | #77 | May 21, 1954 | Eight months |
Otto Austin Loel was wanted for slashing and stabbing a woman 19 times on a road trip. He and the woman's husband set up a ride sharing situation to cover expenses for travel. He was arrested in Sanford, Florida on January 17, 1955, by local police. He had been hiding in a Sanford city dump and living in a crude shack made of palmetto leaves. Loel was executed by electrocution in Oklahoma on January 11, 1957.
| David Daniel Keegan | #78 | June 21, 1954 | Nine years |
David Daniel Keegan was wanted for the murder of a farmer in Iowa when he and three others robbed the farm in the middle of the night. They had taken three occupants hostage while Keegan forced the owner to open his safe at gunpoint before shooting him three times. After bounding and gagging two of the hostages and locking another in a closet, they took the entire safe. Federal process against Keegan was dismissed in Cedar Rapids, Iowa in 1963.
| Walter James Wilkinson | #79 | August 17, 1954 | Five months |
Walter James Wilkinson, as leader of a bandit gang in New York, was wanted for the kidnapping-robbery of a local grocery store manager. He and two accomplices took the man at gunpoint to the store and forced him to open the store safe, then left him the meat freezer to freeze to death. The manager was saved when a family member noticed his disappearance. He was arrested in Los Angeles, California, by the FBI after a citizen recognized him from an Identification Order in a post office. He was working at a country club as a busboy. During the arrest, Wilkinson commented: “It didn’t take too long. I know how you guys work.”
| John Harry Allen | #80 | September 7, 1954 | Three months |
John Harry Allen was wanted for escaping prison for his sixth time when he scaled a wall of the prison. While on the run, he would send police letters taunting them and stated he would get into a shootout before being taken back. He was arrested in Fort Smith, Arkansas on December 21, 1954, after being recognized by two police officers from a Wanted Flyer.

=== 1955 ===
| Name | Sequence Number | Date of Entry | Time Listed |
|---|---|---|---|
| George Lester Belew | #81 | January 4, 1955 | Three weeks |
George Lester Belew, a longtime criminal since the age of 17, was wanted for escaping prison, beating up a jailer, writing bad checks, assault, and forgery. He was arrested at a motel near Champaign, Illinois on January 24, 1955, after the motel owner recognized his photograph on a Wanted Flyer.
| Kenneth Darrell Carpenter | #82 | January 31, 1955 | One week |
Kenneth Darrell Carpenter was wanted for robbing a bank with an accomplice while out on parole. He was arrested near Arlington, Tennessee on February 4, 1955, after an FBI agent recognized him sitting in the vehicle next to his. Carpenter reached for the radio dial in his car and the agent recognized a tattoo of the word “love” on the fingers of his right hand. The agent radioed for assistance and Carpenter was arrested an hour later.
| Flenoy Payne | #83 | February 2, 1955 | Three years |
Flenoy Payne, a longtime violent criminal, was wanted for murder. He had recently released from prison in 1942 after serving nine years of a life sentence for the robbery and murder of a man in Mississippi in 1933. Eventually he moved in with a married woman whose husband had come to reclaim his wife. Payne then shot and killed the husband in an ensuing argument. He was arrested in Crittenden County, Arkansas on March 11, 1958, due to an FBI investigation. Payne was working as an itinerant cotton picker and gambler.
| Palmer Julius Morset | #84 | February 7, 1955 | One year |
Palmer Julius Morset, a longtime criminal, was wanted for failing to show for his bond hearing. His bond was for an armed robbery of a Chicago finance company in 1950 but was caught after crashing his car into a light pole while fleeing. He was arrested in Indianapolis, Indiana on March 2, 1956, due to an FBI investigation.
| Patrick Eugene McDermott | #85 | February 9, 1955 | Five months |
Patrick Eugene McDermott was wanted for escaping prison. He was serving a life sentence for the murder of Canton Daily News editor Don R. Mellet in which he was hired to kill Mellet because of his newspaper articles that accused police officials and criminals working together in the drug trade. After escaping, he somehow acquired a gun and robbed a taxi after forcing the driver to drive him. He was recognized by a police officer from an Identification Order on July 19, 1955. McDermott was working as a local ambulance driver in New York, New York.
| Garland William Daniels | #86 | February 18, 1955 | One month |
Garland William Daniels was wanted for escaping the U.S. Public Service Hospital where he was undergoing treatment for drug addiction and violating a conditional prison release. He had been in custody for writing bad checks he had stolen from a California labor union. He died of an apparent heart attack in Dallas and was identified through a fingerprint examination
| Daniel William O'Connor | #87 | April 11, 1955 | Three years |
Daniel William O'Connor, a military deserter, was wanted for passing bad checks. He was also a Canadian most wanted criminal for shooting at a police officer, beating him unconscious, and tossing his tied body off the road when he was recognized as a check forger. To avoid arrest, he dyed his hair red, grew a mustache, added a tattoo and gained 58 pounds. He was apprehended in El Cajon, California on December 26, 1958, during an investigation of a neighborhood theft of a two-wheeled trailer valued at $15. He was a neighbor of the victim and a routine check of his fingerprints identified him as O’Connor.
| Jack Harvey Raymond | #88 | August 8, 1955 | Two months |
Jack Harvey Raymond was wanted for escaping custody. He had been passing bad checks in Canada and the United States in order to fund a rich lifestyle for himself and his ex-convict girlfriend who he left his wife for. He was apprehended in Denver, Colorado on October 14, 1955, due to an FBI investigation.
| Daniel Abram Everhart | #89 | August 17, 1955 | Two months |
Daniel Abram Everhart, a longtime criminal since the age of 12, was wanted for participating in three armed robberies, two burglaries, and a shootout with police. He was arrested in Denver, Colorado on October 9, 1955, due to an FBI investigation.
| Charles Edward Ranels | #90 | September 2, 1955 | One year |
Charles Edward Ranels, a longtime criminal since the age of 15, was wanted for robbing a bank and supermarket with an accomplice. He had been previously convicted of kidnapping, armed robbery, auto theft, and aiding the escape of a prisoner. He was arrested in Pine Bluff, Arkansas, on December 16, 1956, after neighbors recognized his photo on a Wanted Flyer.
| Thurman Arthur Green | #91 | October 24, 1955 | Four months |
Thurman Arthur Green was wanted for escaping prison and stealing a car where he was serving a six-year sentence for robbery. He was arrested in Nashville, Tennessee on February 16, 1956, due to an FBI investigation. Green had sent his wife to stay with relatives and was home alone in bed recuperating from a toothache. He told the officers, “I was expecting you yesterday.”
| John Allen Kendrick | #92 | November 2, 1955 | One month |
John Allen Kendrick, a longtime gangster, was wanted for assault with the intent to kill, attempted robbery, and carrying a dangerous weapon when he was identified as the shooter of a man who was shot in the throat in Washington, DC. He was arrested in Chicago, Illinois on December 2, 1955, due to an FBI investigation.
| Joseph James Bagnola | #93 | December 19, 1955 | One year |
Joseph James Bagnola was wanted for murdering a used car dealer. He and two others were hired by three local thugs in New Orleans to rob the man of $50,000 and diamonds. During the robbery, they held the dealer and his wife hostage, leading to Bagnola beating the man to death with his pistol. He was arrested in Chicago, Illinois on December 30, 1956, due to an FBI investigation.

=== 1956 ===
| Name | Sequence Number | Date of Entry | Time Listed |
|---|---|---|---|
| Nick George Montos | #94 | March 2, 1956 | One month |
Nick George Montos, a criminal since 14-years-old and later a mafia member, was wanted for escaping prison, again, with a hacksaw. He was arrested in his motel room in Memphis, Tennessee, after being recognized by a citizen. Montos was added to the list twice. He was also #37 on the list being the first person to be added twice.
| James Ignatius Faherty | #95 | March 19, 1956 | Two months |
James Ignatius Faherty, a longtime criminal and armed robber, was wanted for participating in a heist of a Brink's truck alongside Thomas Francis Richardson (#96) and five others. They robbed the truck of more than $1 million. He was arrested in Boston, Massachusetts on May 16, 1956, with Richardson.
| Thomas Francis Richardson | #96 | April 12, 1956 | One month |
Thomas Francis Richardson was wanted for participating in the heist of a Brink's truck alongside James Ignatius Faherty (#95) and five others. They robbed the truck of more than $1 million. He was arrested in Boston, Massachusetts on May 16, 1956, together with Faherty.
| Eugene Francis Newman | #97 | May 28, 1956 | Nine years |
Eugene Francis Newman, a longtime criminal since grade school, was wanted for attempting to rob an armored car with two accomplices while wearing silk stockings over their heads on August 3, 1955. Newman was described as "trigger happy" since he fired a machine gun at the guards, hitting one in the chest. However, the guard managed to pull an alarm. Upon their escape, Newman fired at officers during a police chase. Federal process against Newman was dismissed in Buffalo, New York in 1965.
| Carmine DiBiase | #98 | May 28, 1956 | Two years |
Carmine DiBiase, a.k.a. "Sonny Pinto", was a longtime mobster and criminal. He was wanted for shooting and killing the best man at his wedding. He surrendered to the FBI through an attorney in New York, New York on August 28, 1958. Following his surrender, DiBiase reportedly made the following statement: “I am getting older and accomplishing nothing having to stay away from my wife and children, mother and father. I am glad it is over. I had to come in.”

=== 1957 ===
| Name | Sequence Number | Date of Entry | Time Listed |
|---|---|---|---|
| Ben Golden McCollum | #99 | January 4, 1957 | One year |
Ben Golden McCollum, a longtime criminal, was wanted for escaping prison. While serving a life sentence for robbery, he stabbed two other inmates to death. He was sentenced to die by electric chair before escaping. He was arrested in a rooming house in Indianapolis, Indiana on March 7, 1958.
| Alfred James White | #100 | January 14, 1957 | One week |
Alfred James White was wanted for shooting a West Virginia state officer after attempting to rob a lumberyard. He was arrested in Memphis, Tennessee in January 1957 by the FBI after being recognized by a citizen from a Wanted Flyer.
| Robert L. Green | #101 | February 11, 1957 | Two days |
Robert L. Green, a longtime criminal since childhood, was wanted for escaping prison. He and another inmate fled while being shot at by prison guards. He was serving a 25-year sentence for robbery and armed robbery. He was arrested in St. Paul, Minnesota on February 13, 1957, by the FBI after a citizen recognized his photograph in the Minneapolis Star newspaper before he was about to board a bus to Milwaukee, Wisconsin.
| George Edward Cole | #102 | February 25, 1957 | Two years |
George Edward Cole was wanted for the murder of an off duty police officer. The officer tried to disarm Cole while he was holding up a tavern in San Francisco's "Tenderloin" district on December 30, 1956. He was arrested in Des Moines, Iowa on July 6, 1959, by the FBI after a citizen recognized Cole's female companion from a photograph on a Wanted Flyer.

=== 1958 ===
| Name | Sequence Number | Date of Entry | Time Listed |
|---|---|---|---|
| Eugene Russell McCracken | #103 | March 26, 1958 | One day |
Eugene Russell McCracken, a longtime criminal since the age of 12 and notorious escape artist, was wanted for escaping prison where he was serving a life sentence for the murder of a police officer. He and a companion had been arrested for burglary but escaped and when stopped by a police officer, McCracken shot him dead. He was arrested in Baltimore, Maryland on March 27, 1958, by the FBI after his photo was published in the Baltimore News-Post newspaper. Four separate individuals called the FBI on the same day the newspaper article appeared.
| Frank Aubrey Leftwich | #104 | April 4, 1958 | Two weeks |
Frank Aubrey Leftwich was wanted for escaping prison for a third time while serving 6 – 10 years for armed assault. He had been arrested for drunk driving and shot an officer inside the police station while being booked. He was arrested in Chicago, Illinois on April 18, 1958, due to an FBI investigation.
| Quay Cleon Kilburn | #105 | April 16, 1958 | Two months |
Quay Cleon Kilburn was wanted for escaping prison by using his press pass as editor of the prison newspaper where he was serving time for bank robbery. He was arrested in Los Angeles, California, on June 2, 1958, by the FBI after a citizen recognized him from an Identification Order in a local post office. He was wearing a fake moustache and had a fake ID. Kilburn was also #188 on the list.
| Dominick Scialo | #106 | May 9, 1958 | One year |
Dominick Scialo, a member of the Columbo crime family, was wanted for the gangland shooting of a 17-year-old aspiring fighter in Brooklyn, New York. The boy had been found in a gutter with several bullet wounds in his chest. When the passerby ran to get help, another witness saw a car pull up and shoot the boy three more times. He died 9 days later in the hospital. Scialo surrendered to the FBI in Brooklyn, New York on July 27, 1959. He was later found dead in a social club basement in 1974. It is believed he was killed by the Columbo crime family by an underworld executioner known only as "The Undertaker". Investigators said they believe he was murdered because of his growing erratic behavior and he became a liability to the family.
| Angelo Luigi Pero | #107 | June 16, 1958 | Two years |
Angelo Luigi Pero, a longtime criminal since the age of 13 and member of the Columbo crime family, was wanted for his involvement in the gangland shooting of a 17-year-old aspiring fighter alongside Dominick Scialo (#105) in Brooklyn, New York. The boy had been found in a gutter with several bullet wounds in his chest. When the passerby ran to get help, another witness saw a car pull up and shoot the boy three more times. He died 9 days later in the hospital. Federal process against Pero was dismissed by the U.S. Attorney in New York, New York in 1960.
| Frederick Grant Dunn | #108 | June 17, 1958 | One year |
Frederick Grant Dunn, a longtime criminal, was wanted for escaping prison while awaiting burglary charges. He considered himself the modern day Dillinger or "Baby-Face" Nelson since he was a convicted bank robber known to carry nitroglycerin to blow open safes. He was also connected to multiple high-profile robberies. A farmer located skeletal remains along a stream near Ellsworth, Kansas in 1959 and contacted the sheriff. The remains were sent to the FBI's Laboratory and identified as Dunn. His murder has never been solved.
| Frank Lawrence Sprenz | #109 | September 10, 1958 | Seven months |
Frank Lawrence Sprenz, a.k.a. the "Flying Bank Robber", was wanted for escaping prison when he fashioned a key to his jail cell out of a piece of metal from his bed. He and others overpowered the guards, but he was the only one who managed to escape. For the next year, he would allude custody using multiple aliases, stealing more than two dozen cars, and crisscrossing the country all while on a bank robbery spree. Using the stolen money, he got flying lessons, changing his M.O. He would steal a car, rob a bank, drive to the airport, steal a plane, fly to another city, and repeat the process causing the media to give him his moniker. He was arrested in Laredo, Texas on April 15, 1959, when he was attempting to flee to Mexico in a plane. However, a cow stopped in the middle of the runway causing him to crash into a tree.

=== 1959 ===
| Name | Sequence Number | Date of Entry | Time Listed |
|---|---|---|---|
| David Lynn Thurston | #110 | January 8, 1959 | One month |
David Lynn Thurston was wanted for escaping custody. While being transported to jail and facing 15 years for assault and armed robbery, he fashioned a home made key to unlock his handcuffs and escaped the jail bound bus in Portland, Oregon. He was arrested in New York, New York on February 6, 1959, after attempting to rob a Broadway restaurant with a revolver and sack. He was apprehended by police after being chased by a theater patron and an officer who got involved while directing traffic.
| John Thomas Freeman | #111 | February 17, 1959 | One day |
John Thomas Freeman was wanted for several crimes. He was a suspect in a series of armed robberies in Lebo and Topeka, Kansas totaling over $20,000 and the armed robbery of a drug store for its narcotics. The robberies were committed by Freeman and an escaped convict with sawed off shotguns. His partner was later found dead, strangled, shot in the head, and his throat slit ear to ear. He was arrested by the FBI in Hillside, Maryland on February 18, 1959, after a citizen recognized his photograph in a newspaper article.
| Edwin Sanford Garrison | #112 | March 4, 1959 | One year |
Edwin Sanford Garrison, a.k.a. the "Human Adding Machine" because of his genius in math, was a longtime criminal. He was wanted for escaping an Alabama prison on August 23, 1959. He was serving a life sentence for robbery, larceny, burglary, and murder when he and two others had lit a house on fire that killed a 5-year-old girl. He was arrested in St. Louis, Missouri on September 9, 1960 while working as a book keeper for an inn. Upon his arrest, he told the FBI agents: “I’m glad it’s over. I know the FBI. You can’t fool the FBI for very long.” He was also #59 on the list.
| Emmett Bernard Kervan | #113 | April 29, 1959 | Two weeks |
Emmett Bernard Kervan was wanted for robbing a bank in East Norwalk, Connecticut of $29,445 to fund a lavish lifestyle of high hotels and steak. He was arrested in El Paso, Texas on May 13, 1959, due to an FBI investigation.
| Richard Allen Hunt | #114 | May 27, 1959 | One week |
Richard Allen Hunt was wanted for kidnapping and assault with the intent to murder. He was suspected of auto theft and pulled over by the Harrisburg, Oregon police chief. During the traffic stop, Hunt pulled a gun and forced the officer into the car and drove to Brownsville where he released him. He then got into a wreck while fleeing from officers and then shot the Brownsville police chief in the head with a rifle. He was on the run after escaping from a Montana prison at the time. He was arrested on June 2, 1959, by the local sheriff in Thermopolis, Wyoming, after a citizen recognized Hunt from a Wanted Flyer. He later said he was glad the officer he shot was recovering.
| Walter Bernard O'Donnell | #115 | June 17, 1959 | Two days |
Walter Bernard O'Donnell was wanted for a series of robberies across multiple states. He would drug middle-age, overweight women by either spiking their drinks or convincing them to take weight loss drugs to knock them out and rob them. Some of the women became seriously ill due to the drugs. He was arrested in Norfolk, Virginia on June 19, 1959, by the FBI after a citizen recognized his photograph in a newspaper article. At the time of his apprehension, O’Donnell was posing as a retired U.S. Postal Inspector and was scheduled to speak before a Norfolk citizens’ group that night.
| Billy Owens Williams | #116 | July 10, 1959 | Eight months |
Billy Owens Williams was wanted for escaping a criminally insane state hospital in Florida where he was serving time on kidnapping and robbery charges. He had bound a Banana Trading Card company owner and put him in the trunk of a car for five hours while demanding he pay $1,000 for his release. He was arrested in New York, New York on March 4, 1960, due to an FBI investigation.
| James Francis Jenkins | #117 | July 21, 1959 | Three weeks |
James Francis Jenkins was wanted for escaping prison while serving time for bank robbery. He and an accomplice robbed a bank for $17,730 and were later arrested. While awaiting charges in a Philadelphia jail, he and two other prisoners spent 13 days digging a hole in the roof of their cell with a screwdriver. He was arrested in a Buffalo, New York, motel on August 12, 1959, after an informant tipped off the FBI.
| Harry Raymond Pope | #118 | August 11, 1959 | Two weeks |
Harry Raymond Pope, a longtime criminal and suspected of only having the mental age of a 13-year-old, was wanted for burglary and assault. He was charged with a robbery when attempting to rob a Phoenix drug store of its narcotics and failed to show up for trial. He was known to have a temper and a walking arsenal of weapons. He also only had one eye after a shootout with police in 1958. His girlfriend and former convict, Peggy Frye, was also arrested for harboring a fugitive, though she claimed she had no idea he was a fugitive at the time. He was arrested in Lubbock, Texas, by the FBI and Texas Rangers on August 25, 1959.
| James Francis Duffy | #119 | August 26, 1959 | One week |
James Francis Duffy, a longtime criminal since the age of 19, was wanted for armed robbery. On March 24, 1958, he and three other accomplices robbed an inn at gunpoint. The other three were caught but Duffy managed to stay on the run. He was arrested in Philadelphia, Pennsylvania on September 2, 1959, due to an FBI investigation.
| Robert Garfield Brown Jr. | #120 | September 9, 1959 | Four months |
Robert Garfield Brown Jr. was wanted for armed robbery and assault to kill. He and an accomplice robbed a Canadian couple in Maine and shot the husband. He was arrested in Cincinnati, Ohio on January 11, 1960, by the FBI after a citizen recognized his photograph on an Identification Order.
| Frederick Anthony Seno | #121 | September 24, 1959 | One day |
Frederick Anthony Seno, a longtime criminal, was wanted for escaping custody. While awaiting trial for armed robbery of two Chicago supermarkets, he fled the courthouse. At the time he had deserted his wife and tricked his mother into transferring her life savings to him and disappeared leaving her broke, all while on parole. He was arrested in Miami, Florida on September 24, 1959, in a rooming house where he had been living under an assumed name. When approached by FBI agents he shouted, “Don’t shoot! Don’t shoot!”
| Smith Gerald Hudson | #122 | October 7, 1959 | Ten months |
Smith Gerald Hudson was wanted for murder and escaping prison. He had murdered an acquaintance with a shotgun and left a note stating he was going to kill more people, then himself. However, he was captured four months later while out on bond for involuntary manslaughter because of a car accident he was in that left his brother-in-law dead. He was serving a 10 to 20 term when he escaped. He was arrested in Cozad, Nebraska On July 31, 1960, after a citizen recognized him from a Wanted Flyer. Hudson refused to admit his identity and was identified through fingerprints.
| Joseph Lloyd Thomas | #123 | October 21, 1959 | Two months |
Joseph Lloyd Thomas was wanted for bank robbery. He was one of three men to rob an Indiana bank of $34,000. He was arrested in Pelzer, South Carolina, in December 1959 by the FBI after a citizen recognized his photograph on an Identification Order in a post office. He had grown a mustache for a disguise. He also had established himself in the used car business and had enrolled his children in a local school. He was also #304 on the list.

== End of the decade ==
By the end of the decade, the following fugitives were remaining at large on the FBI's Ten Most Wanted list:

| Name | Sequence number | Date of entry |
|---|---|---|
| Frederick J. Tenuto | #14 | 1950 |
| James Eddie Diggs | #36 | 1952 |
| David Daniel Keegan | #78 | 1954 |
| Eugene Francis Newman | #97 | 1956 |
| Angelo Luigi Pero | #107 | 1958 |
| Edwin Sanford Garrison | #112 | 1959 |

== FBI directors in the 1950s ==
- J. Edgar Hoover (1935–1972)
