= Frederick J. Tenuto =

American mobster and long-time fugitive (born 1915)

Frederick Tenuto
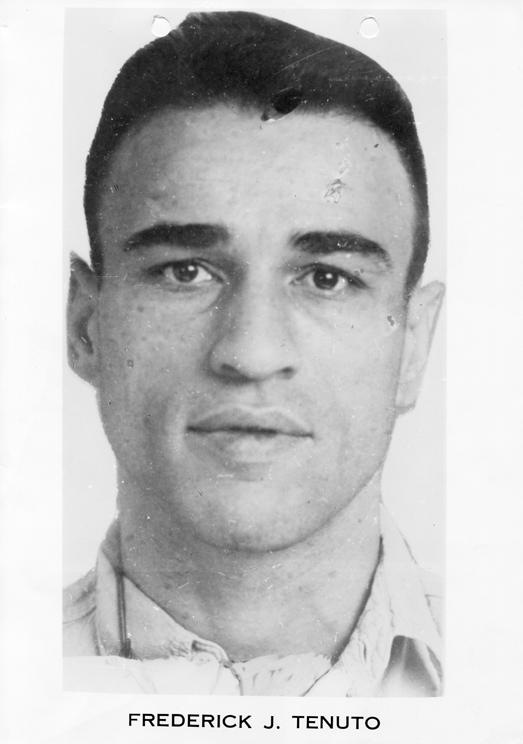

FBI Ten Most Wanted Fugitive
- Charges: Prison escape
- Alias: Angel of Death

Description
- Born: Frederick J. Tenuto; January 20, 1915; Philadelphia, Pennsylvania, U.S.
- Gender: Male

Status
- Convictions: Second degree murder
- Penalty: 10 to 20 years imprisonment
- Added: May 24, 1950
- Number: 14
- Removed from Top Ten Fugitive List

Frederick J. Tenuto (born January 20, 1915) was a New York City mobster and criminal who was on the FBI's Ten Most Wanted list for over a decade, the longest on record at the time. As Top Ten fugitive #14, he replaced Stephen William Davenport, #12, as the first replacement of a fugitive who was not among the original ten. Tenuto's whereabouts are uncertain after the 1947 prison escape that led to his inclusion on the FBI most wanted list.

== Background ==
Tenuto was born in Philadelphia, Pennsylvania, on January 20, 1915. Tenuto was a career criminal who was believed by police to have served as a hitman in several organized crime murders. A police psychiatrist who interviewed him described Tenuto as a man who could murder someone and then calmly sit down to a meal. In 1940, Tenuto pleaded guilty to second degree murder and was sentenced to 10 to 20 years in prison.

On February 10, 1947, Tenuto escaped from the Philadelphia County Prison in a jailbreak with four other inmates, including bank robber Willie "The Actor" Sutton. Eluding authorities for several years, Sutton was eventually identified in early 1952 while riding in a New York City Subway train by Brooklyn resident Arnold Schuster. After Schuster was murdered following a television interview, authorities suspected Tenuto of the killing, supposedly on the orders of New York mobster Albert Anastasia. Tenuto, who had been officially placed on the FBI's Ten Most Wanted list on May 24, 1950, was never captured. Tenuto's name remained on the list for over 14 years. It was removed on March 9, 1964, amid reports Tenuto had been killed and secretly buried.

== See also ==
- List of fugitives from justice who disappeared
