= Dallas Taylor =

Dallas Taylor may refer to:

- Dallas Taylor (drummer) (1948–2015), American session drummer
- Dallas Taylor (podcaster), American host of Twenty Thousand Hertz
- Dallas Taylor (singer) (born 1980), American rock and metal vocalist
- David Dallas Taylor, one of the FBI's ten most wanted fugitives in 1953
