= Fred William Bowerman =

American bank robber

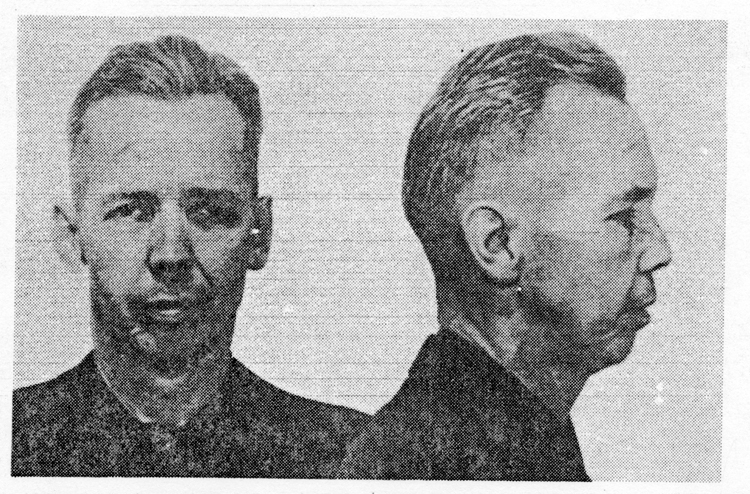
- Mugshot November 5, 1950

FBI Ten Most Wanted Fugitive
- Charges: Armed robbery (1932); Armed robbery (1939)

Description
- Born: January 8, 1893; Pipestone Township, Michigan, U.S.
- Died: May 1, 1953 (aged 60); St. Louis, Missouri, U.S.
- Cause of death: Gunshot wounds
- Occupation: Bank robber

Status
- Penalty: 5 years imprisonment 7 years imprisonment
- Status: Paroled in 1937; Released in 1946
- Added: March 5, 1953
- Number: 46
- Killed during capture attempt

Fred William Bowerman (January 8, 1893 – May 1, 1953) was an American bank robber and Depression-era outlaw.

A veteran holdup man whose criminal career lasted more than 30 years, Bowerman was placed on the FBI's "Ten Most Wanted" list in 1953. Later that year, he led the disastrous Southwest Bank holdup in St. Louis, Missouri, in which he and his three partners wound up in a standoff with more than 100 officers of the St. Louis Police Department. Bowerman died a week later of gunshot wounds sustained during the robbery.

The events were later made into a film, The Great St. Louis Bank Robbery (1959), starring Crahan Denton and Steve McQueen.

== Biography ==
Fred William Bowerman's criminal career began in the 1930s and he was eventually arrested in Illinois for armed robbery in 1932. He served five years and was paroled in 1937 but soon after his release, he began committing robberies throughout the Chicago area. While living in Michigan, he drove to Chicago using stolen cars committing 36 robberies between June and October, 1938. Captured a year later, he was sentenced to Joliet Prison where he spent the next seven years.

After his release in 1946, Bowerman kept a low profile for several years, but he was eventually identified as one of several men who robbed a bank in South Bend, Indiana for $53,000 in September 1952. The violent daylight robbery, much in the style of Thomas Holden or Alvin Karpis, attracted national attention in the United States as a bank employee was shot for "raising his hands too slowly". Nearing 60 years of age, Bowerman was named #46 by the FBI of its "Ten Most Wanted" list on March 3, 1953. In a March 22, 1953 profile of the FBI's "9 Most Wanted" published in the St. Louis Post-Dispatch, Bowerman would be pictured and listed as #2.

A little over a month after the South Bend incident, Bowerman participated in one of the most violent bank heists in American history. On the afternoon of April 24, he and three other men entered the Southwest Bank in south St. Louis, Missouri and attempted to hold up the bank. The robbery started out as planned as the men quickly gathered up around $140,000 from the bank teller's cages and prepared to carry them out in a nylon satchel. However, unknown to Bowerman and the others, a bank employee had set off a silent alarm. As the robbers were about to make their getaway, nearly 100 police officers arrived and surrounded the bank. As the robbers began firing at police through the windows, the bank employees hid in the vault to escape the firefight and tear gas thrown into the building. One police officer, Corporal Robert L. Heitz (July 20, 1911 – December 31, 1993), was wounded in his head and neck, but eventually time began to work against the robbers.

Bowerman took a female hostage, Eva Hamilton, and held a shotgun on her as he attempted to escape, making his way out onto the sidewalk before he shoved the woman to the pavement, breaking both her wrists. Bowerman was shot in the chest by Heitz's partner, former United States Marine Corps Staff Sergeant (1937–1945) and police officer (1942–1973) Melburn Frank “Mel” Stein (December 23, 1913 – August 27, 2016), who served in the Second Sino-Japanese War and World War II. The bullet pierced a lung and lodged in his spine.

Finding themselves trapped in the bank, Bowerman's remaining partners panicked. One man, Frank Vito, committed suicide by shooting himself with his pistol. When police finally stormed the bank, the other, William Scholl, attempted to go for a backup weapon but police disarmed him and dragged him off in handcuffs. The fourth member of the robbery team, one-time Marquette University college football star Glenn Chernick, the getaway driver, fled when police arrived. He was captured by detectives three days later at his father's house in Chicago. Bowerman was taken to a local hospital where he identified himself as John W. Frederick. However, the FBI used his fingerprints to prove his identity. Bowerman died of his wounds on May 1, 1953.

Bowerman was later portrayed by Crahan Denton in The Great St. Louis Bank Robbery (1959); Melburn Stein, the officer who shot Bowerman, had a small role in the film, playing himself.

== See also ==
- List of fugitives from justice who disappeared
