= William Nesbitt =

William Nesbitt may refer to:

- William Nesbitt (Nova Scotia politician), member of the Nova Scotia House of Assembly
- William Beattie Nesbitt, member of the Legislative Assembly of Ontario
- Billy Nesbitt, English footballer

== See also ==
- William Nesbit (disambiguation)
- William Nisbet (disambiguation)
