= William Nesbit =

William Nesbit may refer to:

- William Nesbit (thief) (1899–1983), American jewel thief who briefly escaped prison and was on the FBI's most wanted list
- William Nesbit (activist) (1822–1895), African-American civil rights leader

== See also ==
- William Nesbitt (disambiguation)
- William Nisbet (disambiguation)
