= Frederick Emerson Peters =

American impostor

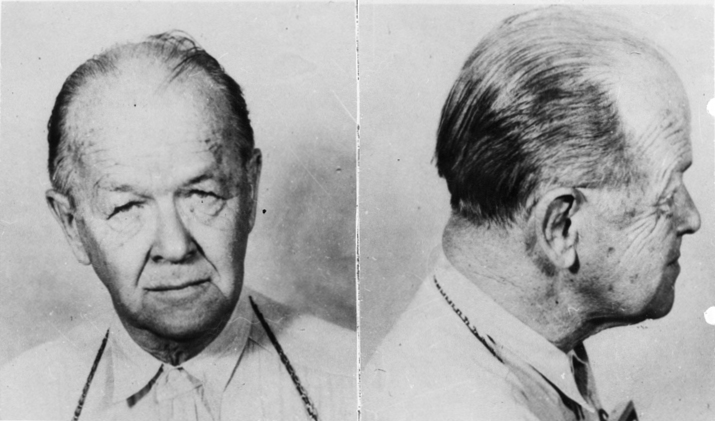

FBI Ten Most Wanted Fugitive

Description
- Born: September 28, 1885; West Salem, Ohio
- Died: July 25, 1959 (aged 73); New Haven, Connecticut

Status
- Added: July 2, 1951
- Caught: January 15, 1952
- Number: 22
- Captured

Frederick Emerson Peters (September 28, 1885 – July 25, 1959) was an American impostor who wrote bad checks masquerading as scholars and famous people. In an age before mass communication, few store owners bothered to ID check writers. He was born in West Salem, Ohio.

== Background ==
Peters began his career of passing phony checks around 1902 when he presented himself as Theodore Roosevelt II, the son of the US president. He used fraudulent checks for his purchases, writing them to round numbers just a couple of dollars above the price of the purchase. Many of the fooled businesses were still impressed and even framed the checks as mementos.

Peters was eventually arrested in 1915 and sentenced to ten years in prison. He took charge of the prison library and used it to study various subjects to further his plans.

When he was released he took a role of antique expert "R.A. Coleman" of the American Peace Society. He visited antique shops ostensibly to buy items for museum collections and again rounded off checks for his "commission". As "J.J. Morton", he bought books for universities. By 1948 he amassed around 130 aliases.

Over the following years he impersonated real people like Franklin D. Roosevelt, Booth Tarkington and Gifford Pinchot II. He was also jailed many times, but always returned to his old activities later. Further research would be needed to clarify if he was the same Frederick Emerson Peters who on July 2, 1951, became the 22nd Ten Most Wanted Fugitive listed by the FBI, and who was then arrested by two FBI agents when they recognized him in a Washington, D.C. hotel lobby on January 15, 1952.

When asked why he kept returning to crime, Peters gave a classic response: "It would require the rock-like will of the Sphynx to resist such temptation." When he was found dead in 1959, he had five checks on his pockets - all of them written for different names. Peters died on July 25, 1959, at a hotel in New Haven, Connecticut of a cerebral hemorrhage.
