= Morley Vernon King =

American fugitive

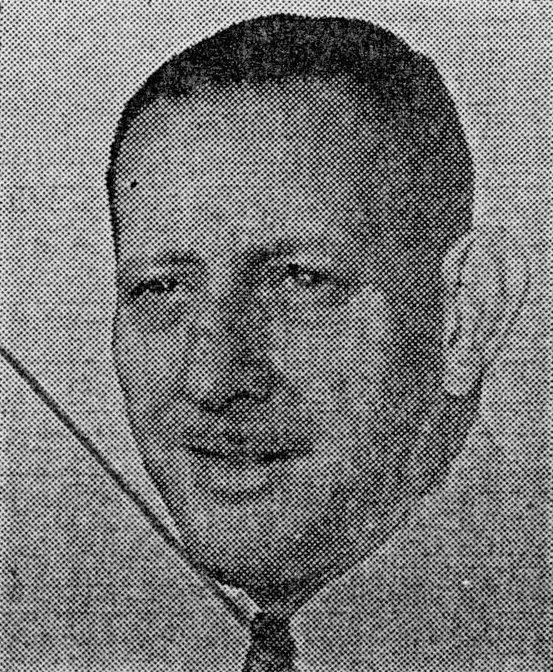
- Photograph taken 1947

FBI Ten Most Wanted Fugitive
- Charges: Murder
- Alias: Stanislaus E. Ludwig; Alfred Edwin Morgan; Nathaniel Goldman; William G. Wilson

Description
- Born: October 20, 1901; Wheeling, West Virginia, U.S.
- Died: September 5, 1954 (aged 52); San Quentin State Prison, San Quentin, California, U.S.
- Nationality: American
- Race: White
- Gender: Male
- Height: 6 ft 1 in (185 cm)
- Weight: 210 lb (95 kg)
- Occupation: cook; sailor; salesman
- Spouse: Helen King (deceased)

Status
- Penalty: Life imprisonment
- Status: Deceased
- Added: March 15, 1950
- Caught: October 31, 1951
- Number: 2
- Captured

Morley Vernon King (October 20, 1901 – September 5, 1954) was an American murderer who was the second person to be listed on the FBI Ten Most Wanted Fugitives list. King murdered his wife Helen in 1947 and was sought as a fugitive since that year. At their inceptions in 1949 and 1950, King was among the first to be listed on the Most Wanted Fugitives list and Ten Most Wanted Fugitives list.

== Background ==
Morley Vernon King was born in West Virginia on October 20, 1901, and ran away from home at age 15. King traveled extensively throughout Europe for several years and lived in Casablanca, Morocco, where he, an accomplished chef and restaurateur, owned and operated a hotel and bar and met and married his wife Helen in 1929. The Kings returned to the United States in 1934 and lived in New Orleans, where they operated another restaurant. At the time of Helen's murder, King was working at the dining room at a hotel in San Luis Obispo, California.

== Murder of Helen King ==
On July 9, 1947, the dead body of Helen King was found in a trunk under the back porch of the hotel where her husband worked. She had been strangled to death, and further investigation showed that she had been killed on July 1. Morley King had not been at his job at the hotel the day prior to the discovery, having left California at about three in the morning that day. The car which King had been seen driving was recovered in Montana roughly a year later. King was formally charged with Helen's murder on July 12, 1947, and on July 18, a warrant was issued for his arrest.

== Manhunt and capture ==
The FBI reported that King walked with a limp due to one leg being slightly shorter than the other, and spoke Spanish, French, and Italian. The FBI additionally reported that due to his experience as an accomplished chef and restaurateur, and his extensive travel outside the United States, he could possibly be working at a restaurant specializing in foreign food. On March 15, 1950, King became the second person to be listed on the FBI Ten Most Wanted Fugitives list. Prior to that, King had been listed on the non-sequential Most Wanted List at its inception in 1949.

King was traced to Philadelphia, Pennsylvania through an order for a shoe specially made to accommodate his limp, and was arrested without incident on October 31, 1951, in the kitchen of a Philadelphia seafood restaurant where he had been working under an assumed identity. Upon his arrest, King had been shucking oysters and reportedly said, "I wondered when the FBI would get me." After his arrest, King's bail was set at $100,000 and he was detained to await extradition to California.

== Aftermath ==
Shortly after King's arrest, he was succeeded on the Ten Most Wanted List by escaped convict Raymond Edward Young. While in custody, King refused to discuss details of his wife's murder, but cooperated with the authorities. On November 13, 1951, King was extradited to California to face legal action for the murder. King's preliminary hearing began on December 3. He initially pleaded not guilty, but later changed his plea to guilty to a second-degree murder charge. On March 13, 1952, King was sentenced to life imprisonment with a minimum term of five years and was transferred to the California Institution for Men in Chino to serve his sentence. King died of heart failure at San Quentin State Prison on September 5, 1954, at age 52.

== See also ==
- FBI Ten Most Wanted Fugitives, 1950s
