= David Clarke (actor) =

American actor

- Clarke in 1961
- Born: August 30, 1908; Chicago, Illinois, U.S.
- Died: April 18, 2004 (aged 95); Arlington, Virginia, U.S.
- Occupations: Broadway and Film actor
- Years active: 1930s-1989
- Spouse: Nora Dunfee (1946-1994, her death) (2 children)
- Children: 2 daughters

David Gainey Clarke (30 August 1908 – 18 April 2004) was an American Broadway and motion picture actor.

== Life and career ==
Clarke was a native of Chicago and graduate of Butler UniversityHe started his career as a stage actor during the 1930s, and made his first film, Knockout, (1941). The actor remains perhaps best known for his film noir roles as a character actor during the 1940s and 1950s. He also played at the Biltmore Theatre in Los Angeles and was featured on Broadway in the original productions of A View from the Bridge, Orpheus Descending, The Ballad of the Sad Cafe, Inquest, and The Visit. On television, Clarke appeared as Abel Bingley on The Waltons and as Tiso Novotny in the soap opera Ryan's Hope.

== Latter years ==
Clarke was married to Nora Dunfee, with whom he had two daughters. He lived in Belmont, Ohio, for several years until he sold his house and moved to Arlington, Virginia, to be with his daughters. He died in Virginia from pneumonia in 2004, aged 95.

== Filmography (selection) ==
- Knockout (1941) - Peters, a Fighter (uncredited)
- Million Dollar Baby (1941) - First Reporter (uncredited)
- The Deadly Game (1941) - John Brandt
- A Gentleman After Dark (1942) - Bellboy
- Men of Texas (1942) - Sentry (uncredited)
- Moonlight in Havana (1942) - Second Player (uncredited)
- Foreign Agent (1942) - Carl Beck
- Reunion in France (1942) - Soldier (uncredited)
- Sweetheart of Sigma Chi (1946) - Trainer (uncredited)
- Swell Guy (1946) - Frank (uncredited)
- The Long Night (1947) - Bill Pulanski
- Killer McCoy (1947) - Pete Mariola
- State of the Union (1948) - Rusty Miller (uncredited)
- Homecoming (1948) - Sergeant (uncredited)
- Berlin Express (1948) - Army Technician (uncredited)
- Raw Deal (1948) - Police Commanding Officer (uncredited)
- The Boy with Green Hair (1948) - Barber
- Wake of the Red Witch (1948) - Mullins (uncredited)
- The Man from Colorado (1949) - Mutton McGuire (uncredited)
- The Set-Up (1949) - Gunboat Johnson
- Red Canyon (1949) - Sears
- The Doolins of Oklahoma (1949) - Dalton (uncredited)
- Illegal Entry (1949) - Carl
- Too Late for Tears (1949) - Jack Sharber (uncredited)
- Thieves' Highway (1949) - Mitch - Thug in Hat (uncredited)
- Abandoned (1949) - Harry
- Intruder in the Dust (1949) - Vinson Gowrie
- Adam's Rib (1949) - Roy (uncredited)
- Sands of Iwo Jima (1949) - Wounded Marine (uncredited)
- The Blonde Bandit (1950) - Police Lt. O'Connor
- Woman in Hiding (1950) - Moyer - Photographer / Reporter (uncredited)
- The Outriders (1950) - Ross (uncredited)
- Wabash Avenue (1950) - Workman (uncredited)
- The Gunfighter (1950) - Eddie's Brother (uncredited)
- The Asphalt Jungle (1950) - Mr. Atkinson - Railroad Man (uncredited)
- The Lawless (1950) - Reporter in Office (uncredited)
- My Friend Irma Goes West (1950) - Bill - Deputy Sheriff (uncredited)
- A Lady Without Passport (1950) - Operator (uncredited)
- Edge of Doom (1950) - Drunken Seaman (uncredited)
- A Life of Her Own (1950) - Charlie, Taxicab Driver (uncredited)
- The Company She Keeps (1951) - Detective Barkley (uncredited)
- Only the Valiant (1951) - Guardhouse Sentry (uncredited)
- The House on Telegraph Hill (1951) - Mechanic
- As Young as You Feel (1951) - Cleveland's Chauffeur (uncredited)
- The Red Badge of Courage (1951) - Corporal by Campfire (uncredited)
- The Narrow Margin (1952) - Joseph Kemp
- Edge of the City (1957) - Wallace
- The Great St. Louis Bank Robbery (1959) - Gino
- Odds Against Tomorrow (1959) - (uncredited)
- A View from the Bridge (1962)
- The Waltons (1975-1977, TV Series) - Able Bingley
- The Front (1976) - Hubert Jackson
- Matilda (1978) - Sheriff
- Ryan's Hope (1979-1980, TV Series) - Tiso Novotny
- Cutting Class (1989) - Crusty Old Man (final film role)
