= Peter T. Farrell =

American politician

Peter T. Farrell (November 12, 1900 – November 9, 1992) was an American judge from Queens, New York City, who served as a judge on Queens County Court and the New York Supreme Court, where he primarily handled criminal cases. Farrell was best known for presiding over the trial of bank robber Willie Sutton, who was sentenced to 30 to 120 years in Attica State Prison, before Farrell suspended the sentence in 1969 because of Sutton's deteriorating health.

== Early life and education ==
Farrell was born in the Manhattan section of New York City and grew up in the neighborhood of Corona in Queens. He graduated from Newtown High School. He earned a Bachelor of Arts degree from Cornell University in 1922 and was awarded his law degree in 1925 by the Fordham University School of Law.

He was a member of the New York State Assembly (Queens Co., 3rd D.) in 1930, 1931, 1932, 1933, 1934, 1935 and 1936.

He was a member of the New York State Senate (3rd D.) from 1937 to 1943, sitting in the 160th, 161st, 162nd, 163rd and 164th New York State Legislatures. He resigned his seat in 1943 to become a judge of the Queens County Court.

== Judicial career ==
In 1943, Farrell was elected to serve on the Queens County Court and spent most of his judicial career on criminal cases. He served as the court's senior judge from 1945 until 1961, when the court was abolished and its responsibilities consolidated into the New York Supreme Court. He was the senior judge in Queens on the Supreme Court, Criminal Term, until he stepped down in 1976.

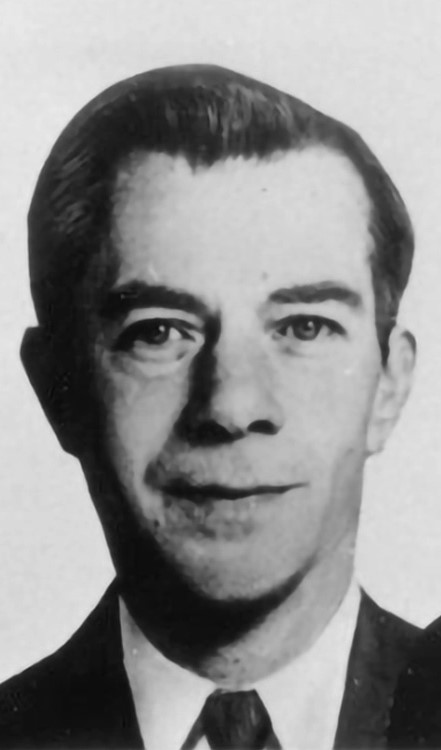
FBI photo of bank robber Willie Sutton.

Farrell presided over the 1952 trial of bank robber Willie Sutton in which Sutton had been charged with the 1950 heist of $63,942 from a branch of the Manufacturers Trust Company in Sunnyside, Queens, part of more than $2 million he was estimated to have stolen from various banks over the course of his career in crime. Sutton was found guilty and given a sentence of 30 to 120 years in Attica State Prison.

Farrell suspended Sutton's sentence in December 1969, ruling that Sutton's good behavior in prison and his deteriorating health due to emphysema justified the suspension of the sentence. After the ruling was delivered, Sutton said "Thank you, your Honor. God bless you" and started crying as he was led out of the court building. Sutton still had to receive a suspension of a separate 30-year-to-life sentence he had received in Brooklyn in 1952 and then could be released on parole from a 1930 conviction. Sutton would ultimately die in 1980.

== Death ==
Farrell died at age 91 on November 9, 1992, of pneumonia at his home in Manhasset, New York. He was survived by his wife, the former Agnes Byrne, as well as by two daughters and 10 grandchildren.

New York State Assembly
Preceded by Charles W. Posthauer	New York State Assembly; Queens County, 3rd District; 1930–1936	Succeeded by John V. Downey
New York State Senate
Preceded by Frank B. Hendel	New York State Senate; 3rd District; 1937–1943	Succeeded by John V. Downey
