= Ollie Gene Embry =

American bank robber (1929–2025)

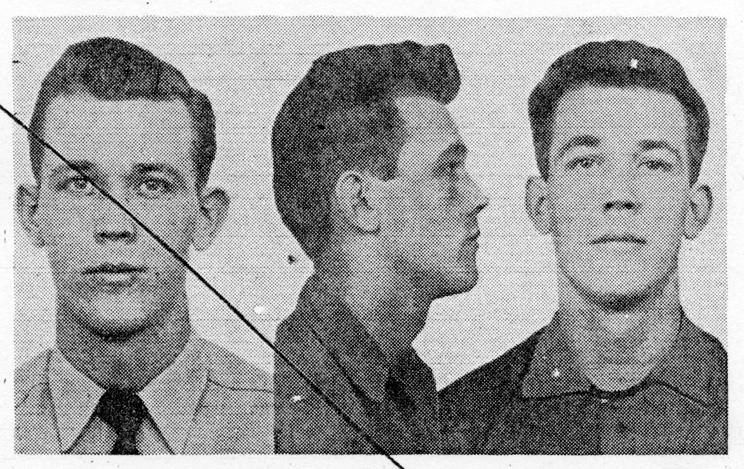
- Photographs taken 1949

FBI Ten Most Wanted Fugitive
- Charges: Bank robbery

Description
- Born: March 22, 1929; Harrisburg, Arkansas, U.S.
- Died: April 18, 2025 (aged 96); Shawnee, Kansas, U.S.

Status
- Added: July 23, 1951
- Caught: August 5, 1951
- Number: 24
- Captured

Ollie Gene Embry (March 22, 1929 – April 18, 2025) was an American bank robber who was on the FBI Ten Most Wanted Fugitives List in 1951.

== Bank robbery ==
Embry robbed the Monroe National Bank in Columbia, Illinois on February 6, 1951. Three others who robbed the bank with him were arrested before he was and given long jail terms. The robbers were Patrick Kane, Ollie Gene Embry and James McAllister. The robbers collected $8855. Driving away in a stolen car, they spread roofing nails on the road. They ran their first car into a ditch and then got into another car. The getaway driver, Frank Daubauch, was later picked up by East St. Louis detectives who noticed him driving a new car in town.

The three other robbers were soon named and police were dispatched to look for them. Kane and McAllister met soon after at the George Washington Hotel in St. Louis to divide the money with Embry. Embry entered the hotel and became suspicious of a man in the lobby. He fled and the other two were soon arrested.

== Capture ==
On August 5, 1951, FBI agents and city detectives captured Embry while he was working at a gas station as an attendant. He was unarmed and surrendered without a struggle. The officers asked him to "check the radiator" on a car. When he raised the hood of the car he was subdued by agents who said, "So you're Ollie Embry...we're from the FBI." Three officers were in attendance, one of whom was Lee Boardman of the FBI. Embry had been working at the filling station for about two months, when someone on the street recognized him from the FBI posters and called it in. Embry had only been on the most wanted men list for twelve days, having been added on July 23, 1951.

Embry faced a potential sentence of up to 180 years in prison for the crime. Embry pleaded guilty to eight counts on August 21, 1951, and was sentenced to 15 years in prison on August 28. (Note: Embry was sentenced to individual terms of 5 years, 10 years, and 15 years' imprisonment. The sentences ran concurrently, meaning he would serve 15 years.)

Embry died in Shawnee, Kansas, on April 18, 2025, at the age of 96.
