= The Great St. Louis Bank Robbery =

- Lobby card
- Directed by: Charles Guggenheim; John Stix
- Written by: Richard T. Heffron
- Produced by: Charles Guggenheim
- Starring: Steve McQueen; David Clarke; Crahan Denton
- Cinematography: Victor Duncan
- Edited by: Warren Adams
- Music by: Bernardo Segall
- Production companies: Charles Guggenheim & Associates
- Distributed by: United Artists
- Release date: September 10, 1959 (United States)
- Running time: 89 minutes
- Country: United States
- Language: English

The Great St. Louis Bank Robbery (also called The St. Louis Bank Robbery, the film title in the opening credits) is a 1959 American heist film directed by Charles Guggenheim and starring Steve McQueen as a college dropout hired to be the getaway driver in a bank robbery.

Based on a 1953 bank robbery attempt of Southwest Bank in St. Louis, the film was shot on location in 1958. It features some of the men and women from the St. Louis Police Department, as well as local residents and bank employees, reenacting their roles during the actual robbery attempt. Between filming and the film's release, Steve McQueen gained national recognition with his breakout role as Josh Randall in the TV series Wanted Dead or Alive.

== Plot ==
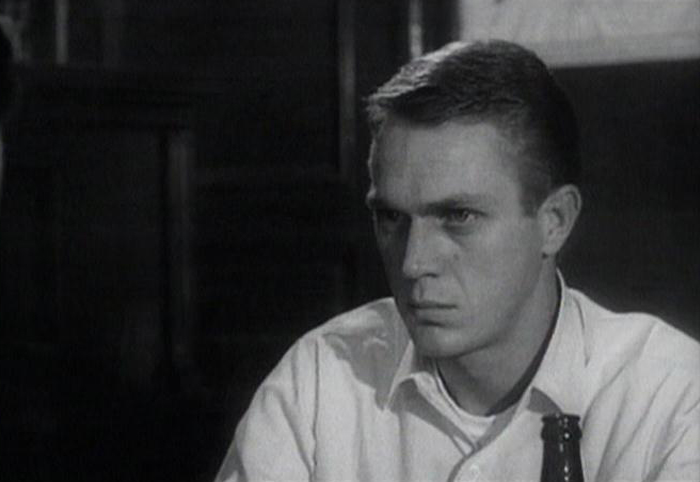
Steve McQueen in The Great St. Louis Bank Robbery

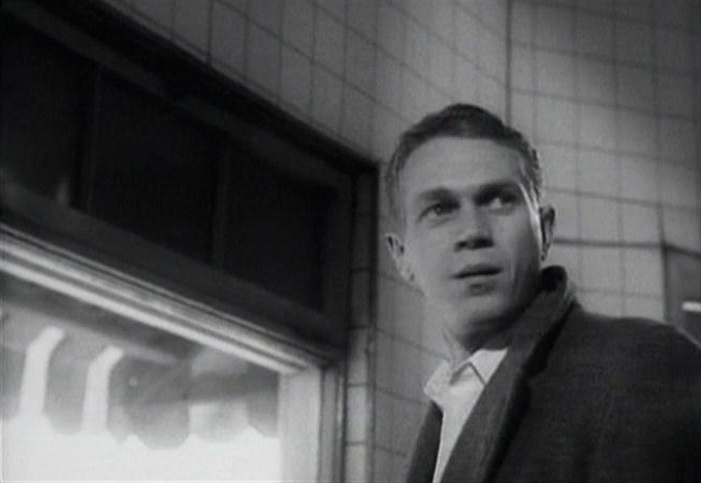
Steve McQueen in the film

Aging criminal mastermind John Egan decides to rob St. Louis' Southwest Bank, then use the loot to retire to Mexico with his longtime minion Willy. Their accomplice, Gino, is an ex-convict terrified of returning to prison, and wants money to pay for his defense in an upcoming criminal trial. The gang needs a driver for the getaway car. Gino recruits his sister Ann's old boyfriend, George Fowler, a former collegiate football star with no criminal history. Egan takes a liking to George, much to Willy's displeasure.

The gang meticulously gathers information on the bank to help Egan draw up his plans. In order to pay for a hotel room, Gino convinces George to borrow money from Ann. The transaction is the first meeting between the young couple since an unspecified action by George got them both expelled from college. George and Gino keep the incident hidden from Egan, who refuses to have women even tangentially involved in his work; he drunkenly confesses to George that his misogyny comes from experiences with his abusive mother, whom he eventually murdered by pushing her down a flight of stairs.

Ann sees George and Gino watching the bank, and deduces that they are planning a robbery. She confronts George, who claims that he will use the money to return to school and straighten out his life. Ann still feels too much affection for George to notify the police, but she goes to the Southwest Bank at night and writes a warning about the impending robbery on its window. Willy saw George and Ann together, enabling Egan to trace the source of the message. The gang invades Ann's apartment, with Egan demanding that she leave town until the heist has been completed. Both Gino and George fail to stand up for Ann, letting Egan and Willy carry her away. As the three leave the apartment building, Egan has a flashback to his mother's murder and throws Ann to her death off the fire escape.

Feeling personally betrayed by George, Egan orders him to participate directly in the robbery while Willy drives the car. They neglected to bring a police-frequency scanner and are unaware that the bank had relocated a switchboard from the lobby, elements that foil key aspects of their plan. An employee triggers the silent alarm, and police swarm the bank exterior. Willy flees in the car, leaving the other robbers stranded. As the gang try to work out their next move, Egan inadvertently reveals that he killed Ann. He forces his way out of the bank, using a teller as a human shield, but is shot down by the police. Gino dies by suicide in the basement vault.

George, wounded by a shot in the leg, takes a young woman hostage. Her husband tries to intervene, and the woman warns him that George is a vicious criminal who will show them no mercy. Already shaken by Ann's death, George breaks down and begins protesting that he is not really a criminal. He releases the woman and lets himself be captured by the police. Driven away in a paddy wagon, he sees the world receding behind metal bars.

== Cast ==
- Steve McQueen as George Fowler
- Crahan Denton as John Egan, the gang boss
- David Clarke as Gino, Ann's brother
- James Dukas as Willy, the driver
- Molly McCarthy as Ann, George's ex-girlfriend and Gino's sister
- Martha Gable as Eddie's wife
- Larry Gerst as Eddie

== Reception ==
The New York Post reviewer wrote: “Just about every TV hero takes a flier at a theater-size movie. Now it is Steve McQueen…in ‘The Great St. Louis Bank Robbery,’ with dramatic plot to offset the documentary format....It is a fairly lucid film, purportedly factual with the St. Louis police department drafted for the actual stickup scenes; co-directed with some skill by Charles Guggenheim and John Stix from a well-padded script....The low-budgeted thriller boasts an effective musical background score...which does much to enliven the dragged-out action....The script reiterates that crime does not pay. Performances are adequate, but not outstanding, although McQueen is a handsome blond looker who likely would catch on in more big-size movies.”

The Los Angeles Citizen-News found the film “a garbled attempt at arty realism…rehashes the old story of plotting the bank holdup that fails.”

== See also ==
- Fred William Bowerman, the actual leader of the robbery gang (and figure for character John Egan)
