= Nora Dunfee =

American actress

- Dunfee in 1961
- Born: Marjorie Dean Dunfee; December 25, 1915; Belmont, Ohio, U.S.
- Died: December 23, 1994 (aged 78); New York City, U.S.
- Occupation: Actress

Marjorie Dean Dunfee (December 25, 1915 – December 23, 1994) was an American Broadway and film actress and acting coach.

== Early years ==
Born in Belmont, Ohio, on December 25, 1915, Dunfee was the daughter of Mr. and Mrs. O. B. Dunfee.

== Career ==
Dunfee began her professional acting career at the Ogunquit Playhouse in Ogunquit, Maine, starring in Sinclair Lewis's production of Our Town. Her stage credits on- and off-broadway include Madam, Will You Walk? (1953), The Midnight Caller (1958), The Visit (1960), The Last Days of Lincoln (1961) and Crowbar (1990). She also appeared in several films, most notably as the elderly lady at the bus stop who gives Tom Hanks advice in Forrest Gump.

After World War II, Dunfee was a student at the Actors Laboratory Theater in Los Angeles and worked there. During that time she gained insights into dialect and phonetics. That experience eventually led to her becoming a dialect specialist. In the early 1960s, she operated the Nora Dunfee Studio in New York.

Dunfee studied speech and voice under Margaret Prendergast McLean and taught for many years in the graduate acting program of the Tisch School of the Arts at New York University. She also taught privately in New York and California and coached many actors over the years, including Julie Haydon, James Earl Jones, Raul Julia, Diane Keaton, Mel Gibson and Keanu Reeves. In theater, she was a vocal consultant for The Real Thing. Two Gentlemen of Verona and A Lie of the Mind, and cinematically, she served as dialect coach for such films as Witness, Crimes of the Heart, and The Serpent and the Rainbow.

Dunfee met her future husband, David Clarke, in an acting class and the two married in 1946. Plays in which they acted together included Portrait of a Lady, The Visit and The Gin Game. Clarke and Dunfee had two daughters together, K.C. and Susan.

Her last consulting job was on the film Rob Roy (1995). Dunfee was working as Sissy Spacek's dialogue coach and preparing for her own role in Charles Matthau's adaptation of Truman Capote's The Grass Harp when she became ill and had to leave the shoot.

== Death ==
Dunfee died on December 23, 1994, from complications after a brief illness at St. Clare's Hospital and Health Center in Manhattan.

== Filmography ==
Year	Title	Role	Notes
1992	Lorenzo's Oil	Murphy Family	
1994	Forrest Gump	Elderly Southern Woman on bench in Savannah, Georgia	
1995	The Grass Harp	Mrs. Peters	(final film role)
