= John Allen Kendrick =

American bank robber

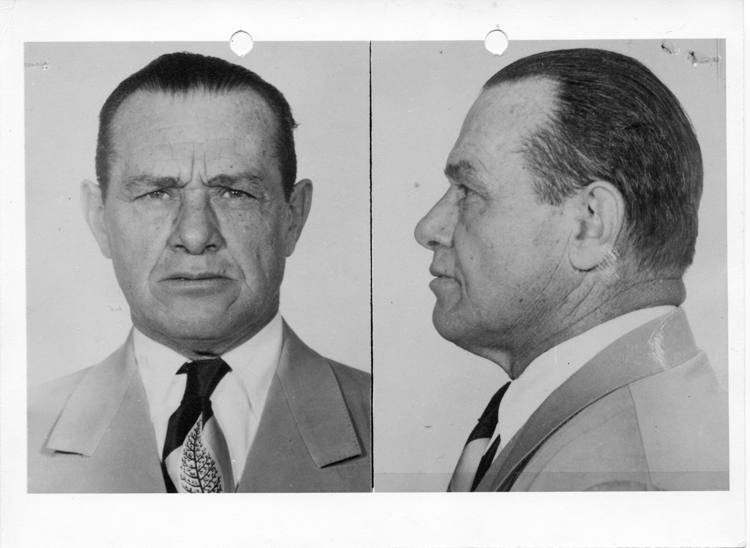

FBI Ten Most Wanted Fugitive

Description
- Born: February 18, 1901; Washington, D.C.
- Died: November 20, 1960 (aged 59); Springfield, Missouri
- Occupation: Gangster

Status
- Convictions: Assault with intent to kill
- Penalty: 5-17 years imprisonment
- Added: November 2, 1955
- Number: 92
- Captured

John Allen Kendrick (February 18, 1901 – January 20, 1960) was an American criminal, escape artist, bank robber and member of the Tri-State Gang whose career spanned four decades. He was listed on the FBI's Top Ten Most Wanted in late 1955, and was apprehended by the FBI that same year.

== Biography ==
A longtime career criminal, John Allen Kendrick was first arrested by the Baltimore Police Department and charged with larceny and murder in May 1923. He was convicted of larceny and a reduced assault charge, sentenced to five years imprisonment, and released on December 24, 1928. Two years later, he was convicted on a concealed weapons charge and sentenced to two and a half years in February 1930. He escaped from prison on September 2, 1931, but was indicted six months later for shooting a police officer in Washington, D.C. and sentenced to ten years at the federal penitentiary in Lorton, Virginia.

On July 3, 1933, Kendrick escaped from the correctional facility and eventually joined up with the Tri-State Gang, a group of Depression-era bank robbers and stick-up men active in the Mid-Atlantic United States during the early to mid-1930s. The gang were responsible for countless robberies in Pennsylvania, Maryland, Virginia, North Carolina and Washington, D.C.

In June 1934, Kendrick was arrested in Johnson City, Tennessee and returned to Lorton. He remained there for a brief time and transferred to Alcatraz, then to Leavenworth federal penitentiary in July 1941. He remained in Leavenworth for the rest of his sentence but, instead of being released, he was instead extradited to New Jersey to finish his original prison sentence for the 1930 weapons charge. He was finally released after being granted parole in June 1943.

Four years after his release, Kendrick was arrested for the murder of an underworld figure in Washington, DC in June 1947. Tried and convicted on December 10 of that year, he was sentenced to between 3 and 10 years in Leavenworth. He was paroled in March 1954 but arrested nine months later after being identified as the assailant of the man who had seriously wounded a Washington, D.C. resident after shooting the man in the throat. Indicted for the shooting in August 1955, he was charged with "unlawful flight to avoid prosecution" a month later and was officially added to the FBI's Top Ten Most Wanted on November 2.

Kendrick was tracked down by the FBI within a month and was arrested by federal agents in Chicago on December 5, 1955. He was apprehended without incident and extradited back to Washington, D.C. where he convicted and given a long jail sentence. Kendrick testified that he had been offered $2,500 to murder Michael Lee but declined the job because "when I got done paying taxes out of that, what would I have left?"
