= Arnold Schuster =

American detective (1928–1952)

Arnold Schuster

Arnold L. Schuster (February 21, 1928 – March 8, 1952) was an American clothing salesman and amateur detective known for his involvement in the capture of bank robber Willie "The Actor" Sutton and for Schuster's subsequent murder by either the Gambino crime family, associates of Sutton, or any one of the many suspects police questioned about his death. He was a distant paternal cousin of literary agent and book publisher M. Lincoln ("Max") Schuster of Simon & Schuster.

== Background ==
A longtime resident of Brooklyn, New York, 24-year-old Schuster recognized wanted bank robber Willie "The Actor" Sutton while travelling on the city subway on February 18, 1952. Following Sutton to a garage, Schuster quickly notified police of his whereabouts. This resulted in the robber's arrest a short time later as he was changing a dead battery from his car, which had stalled in the street near his furnished room.

== Death and aftermath ==
After receiving publicity from New York City press regarding his involvement with Sutton's capture, including a televised interview with the New York Police Commissioner, Schuster was murdered outside his home on March 8, 1952, by a lone gunman. Although the police quickly organized a manhunt, their search failed to apprehend any suspects. Within two days, Sutton associate and FBI Ten Most Wanted fugitive and hit man Frederick J. Tenuto was a primary suspect in Schuster's murder, having been positively identified by witnesses who saw Tenuto near the crime scene. According to Detective Jack LaTorre, over 300 suspects were also questioned, one being a local fence for stolen goods.

According to testimony in 1963 by Mafia informant Joseph Valachi, Gambino crime family boss Albert Anastasia allegedly ordered Schuster's murder. When Anastasia saw Schuster being interviewed on television, he allegedly said: "I can't stand squealers! Hit that guy!" However, law enforcement authorities were skeptical of Valachi's claims regarding Anastasia, as a murder sanctioned by a notorious organized crime leader would undoubtedly draw unwanted attention from police and the public. Although Frederick Tenuto remained on the FBI's Most Wanted list for many years, he was never found, and is believed by authorities to have been eliminated by the Mafia before he could be apprehended by the police. Schuster's murder remains unsolved.

Schuster was buried in Montefiore Cemetery in Springfield Gardens, Queens.

Schuster's estate sued New York City for failure to protect him. In accordance with the law at that time, their complaint was dismissed, and the dismissal was affirmed by the intermediate appellate court (1955). In general, governments were held not to owe protection obligations to citizens for fear of straining public treasuries (among other reasons). However, in a landmark case, New York's highest court reversed the decisions and ruled that in a case where a member of the public has furnished the sort of cooperation that the police have asked the public for, an obligation of protection of a person who comes forward to help the police is created. Schuster v. City of New York, 5 N.Y.2d 75 (1958). This important precedent meant the case could go to trial. The City of New York eventually settled for $41,000, a reasonably large sum at the time, especially considering that even the presumably exaggerated sum the complaint sought was $1,000,000.

== See also ==
- List of unsolved murders (1900–1979)
