= Fleet Robert Current =

American bank robber

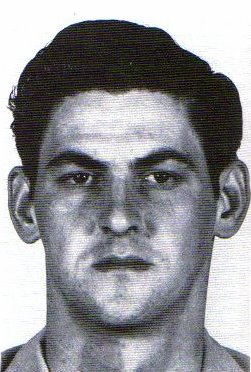
- Fleet Robert Current

FBI Ten Most Wanted Fugitive
- Alias: The Apple

Description
- Born: May 28, 1924
- Died: August 30, 1983 (aged 59); California
- Nationality: American

Status
- Convictions: Robbery
- Added: May 18, 1953
- Caught: July 12, 1953
- Number: 52
- Captured

Fleet Robert Current (May 28, 1924 – August 30, 1983) was an American bank robber and listed on the FBI's Ten Most Wanted list in 1953.

== Background ==
Current began his criminal career in 1942, when he was convicted for burglary and sentenced to nine months imprisonment in Oakland County jail and, following his release, would be linked to numerous robberies throughout the west coast and later the Minneapolis-St. Paul area.

In August 1948, Current's raid on a Minneapolis loan company would be acknowledged by police officials as "...the smoothest stickup in a generation" for which he was later sentenced to five years imprisonment. After serving less than three years, Current was released on parole in May 1951 and returned to California where he was identified committing a string of robberies between 1952 and 1953 including a robbery of a Minneapolis tavern of $2,500 in November 1952 and $1,500 from a San Francisco restaurant in January 1953.

After yet another robbery in San Francisco, on May 18, 1953, he became the 52nd person added to the FBI's Ten Most Wanted Fugitives list charged with unlawful flight to avoid prosecution for robbery. During this time, Current was frequently on the road and placed in several locations across the country including the March 1 robbery of $24,000 from a St. Paul dairy and $250 from a Minneapolis hotel only two weeks later.

Despite his status as a federal fugitive, Current continued his crime spree participating in the robbery of $5,148 from the American Trust Company with two Oakland criminals on June 25. A longtime sufferer of severe tuberculosis, of which his noticeably enlarged larynx attributed to his prison nickname "The Apple", was worsened by his traveling and fled to Omaha, Nebraska with his teenaged wife in early July. Although believing he would not be recognized, federal agents received an anonymous tip regarding Current's whereabouts and, on July 12, he and his wife were arrested by federal agents and local police officials. Unarmed, Current offered no resistance as he was taken into custody and extradited to California where he was eventually convicted and imprisoned.

== See also ==
- List of fugitives from justice who disappeared
