= William Nesbit (thief) =

Thief

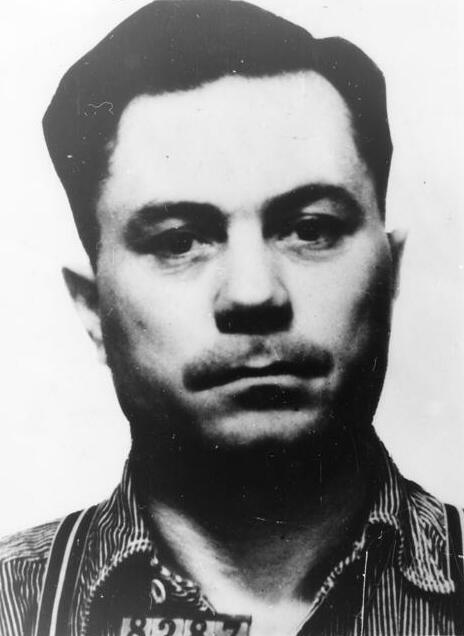
- Nesbit in 1937

FBI Ten Most Wanted Fugitive

Description
- Born: William Raymond Nesbit; June 1, 1899; Marshalltown, Iowa
- Died: August 6, 1983 (aged 84); Sioux City, Iowa, U.S.
- Nationality: American
- Gender: Male

Status
- Convictions: Second degree murder
- Penalty: Life imprisonment; commuted to 20 years imprisonment
- Status: Deceased
- Added: March 15, 1950
- Caught: March 18, 1950
- Number: 3
- Captured

William Raymond Nesbit (June 1, 1899 – August 6, 1983) was an American jewel thief active in the 1930s. He was born in Marshalltown, Iowa.

== Background ==
On December 31, 1936, he killed fellow thief Harold Baker in a gunpowder explosion in Minnehaha County, near Sioux Falls, South Dakota. He was arrested February 26, 1937, and was convicted of second degree murder and sentenced on May 28, 1937, to life imprisonment, which on February 18, 1946, was commuted to 20 years incarceration. Imprisoned in Sioux Falls, South Dakota, he eventually became a "trusty" and the personal chauffeur of the warden.

== Disappearance and capture ==
On September 4, 1946, he failed to return from running errands, and on December 26, 1946, he was charged in absentia with unlawful flight to avoid confinement. On March 15, 1950, he became the third member of the Federal Bureau of Investigation's first-ever FBI ten most wanted fugitives list, and was arrested in a cave in Saint Paul, Minnesota, three days later.

== Death ==
Nesbit died at a hospital in Sioux City, Iowa, on August 6, 1983. He had been suffering from a long illness prior to his death.
