= William Nisbet =

William Nisbet may refer to:

- William Nisbet MP (1666–1724), one of the Scottish representatives to the first Parliament of Great Britain
- William Nisbet (physician) (1759–1822), Scottish physician
- William Hamilton Nisbet (1747–1822), British politician
- William Nisbet (mason), Grand Master of the Grand Lodge of Scotland, 1746–1747
- William Nisbet of Dean, Scottish merchant who twice served as Provost of Edinburgh

== See also ==
- William Nesbit (disambiguation)
