= Nick George Montos =

American robber (1916–2008)

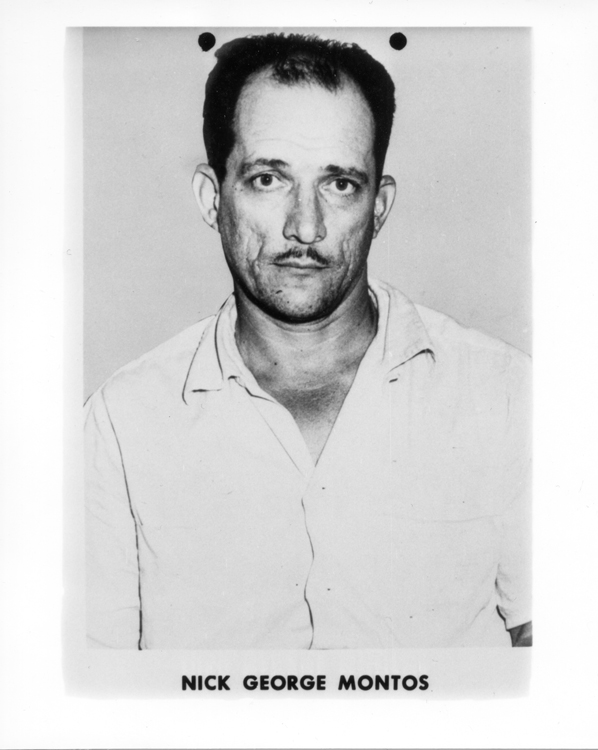

FBI Ten Most Wanted Fugitive
- Charges: Bank Robbery - Escape from prison

Description
- Born: November 8, 1916; Tampa, Florida
- Died: November 30, 2008 (aged 92); Massachusetts

Status
- Added: September 8, 1952; March 2, 1956
- Caught: August 23, 1954; March 28, 1956
- Number: 37 & 94
- Captured

Nicholas George Montos (November 8, 1916 – November 30, 2008) was an American criminal, associate of the Chicago Outfit and a fugitive. Montos was the first person to be placed twice on the FBI Ten Most Wanted Fugitives list. At his death in 2008 aged 92, Montos was the oldest inmate in the state of Massachusetts.

== Life as a criminal ==
Montos first became involved in crime at the age of 14 and dropped out of a Lakeland, Florida high school in the 11th grade in 1933. He was arrested in Tampa in August 1934 for breaking and entering, but released. In November 1934, he was arrested in Raleigh, North Carolina for auto theft and served 18 months, first in Ohio and then at a prison camp in Petersburg, Virginia. In July 1936, he was arrested for possessing burglary tools but escaped from the Miami county jail before being recaptured and serving time in Raiford. He was picked up yet again in 1938 for burglaries in Alabama and Georgia, and escaped twice in Alabama in 1942 and 1944.

By 1945, he had set himself up in Chicago and was convicted on charges of burglary and postal larceny. More burglary charges in Alabama and Mississippi were filed against Montos in 1949, 1950 and 1951. On September 8, 1952 he was placed on the FBI Ten Most Wanted Fugitives list for the first time after a escaping prison multiple times while serving time for a robbery in Georgia. He had beat a 74-year-old man and the man's sister with a gun with three others. He was arrested in 1954 as he prepared to rob a freight train in Chicago. On March 2, 1956, he was added to the list for a second time for escaping prison. He was arrested 26 days later in Memphis, Tennessee in his hotel room by federal agents when he was recognized by a citizen.

Two years later Montos escaped from the Mississippi State Penitentiary using a hacksaw. He was again placed on the FBI fugitives list and caught 26 days later. From 1957 to 1962, he was imprisoned at Alcatraz, and was soon recaptured upon release for an armed robbery.

After being released from prison in May 1973, he joined the payroll of Chicago Teamsters Local 714 while moonlighting as a burglar in Youngstown, Ohio. In the late 1970s, he was living in the Chicago suburb of Forest Park and working for Chicago Outfit members John Monteleone and James Torello. He was a prime suspect in the attempted murder of Milwaukee Mafia member Vincent Maniaci in 1977.

In 1985, Montos was arrested with three accomplices while robbing a Hammond, Indiana jewelry store. They were caught because their walkie-talkies shared the police band. He then jumped bail and fled to Greece. Sometime in the early 1990s, he returned to the U.S.

Montos attempted to rob a Brookline, Massachusetts antiques store in 1995. He tied up its owner, 73-year-old Sonia Paine, referring to her with an antisemitic epithet. She managed to escape and attack Montos with a baseball bat. At the time, Montos had been a fugitive for nine years, having been convicted in absentia for robbing an Indiana jewelry store. Montos was sentenced to serving 33 to 40 years for the Brookline robbery and sent to the Massachusetts Correctional Institution — Norfolk.

Montos, who suffered from heart problems had a triple bypass in 2000. Later into his sentence he became weaker and started to pick up more health problems. He applied for parole after the surgery but it was denied. A few weeks before his death Montos suffered a heart attack and once again applied for parole. Montos died on November 30, 2008, while his parole plea was still to be evaluated.
