= Orba Elmer Jackson =

American robber

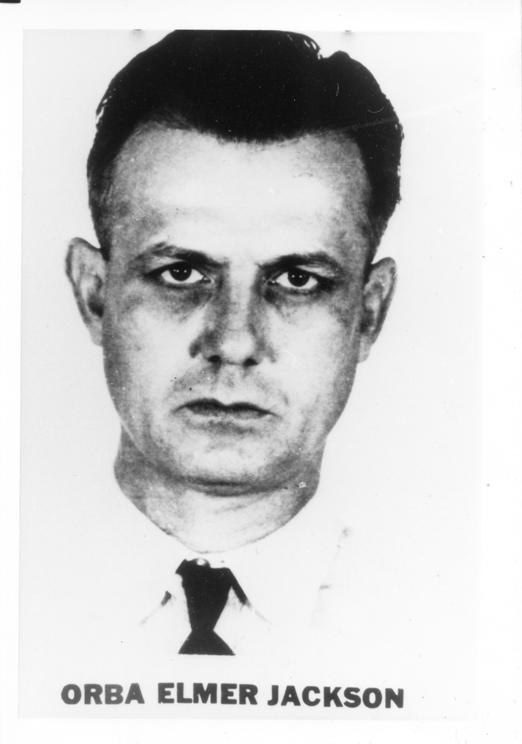

FBI Ten Most Wanted Fugitive
- Charges: Escaped federal prisoner, robbery
- Alias: Kenneth Van Kempen

Description
- Born: May 20, 1906
- Died: January 8, 1993 (aged 86); Riverside County, California
- Nationality: American

Status
- Added: March 18, 1950
- Caught: August 18, 1950
- Number: 7
- Captured

Orba Elmer Jackson (May 20, 1906 – January 8, 1993) was an American robber who was on the FBI Ten Most Wanted Fugitives list in 1950. Jackson was a federal prisoner sentenced to two years to run concurrently with his sentence being served, and returned to Leavenworth on September 19, 1950.

== Capture and aftermath ==
He was arrested March 23, 1950 at a poultry farm outside Portland, Oregon and was indicted by the Federal Grand Jury at Kansas City, Missouri on March 18, 1949 charged with unlawful escape. He had been transferred to an honor farm September 3, 1947, but disappeared three weeks later. Jackson had been convicted April 8, 1936 and returned to Leavenworth for beating a man and robbing a store also serving as a United States Post Office near Poplar Bluff, Missouri. He was sentenced again in 1928 for car theft to three years at the United States Penitentiary at Leavenworth, Kansas. Jackson was released from prison in 1928 after he was sentenced to six years at Missouri State Penitentiary at Jefferson City, Missouri in 1924 on a charge of grand larceny of an automobile in Joplin, Missouri.
