= Frederick Grant Dunn =

American bank robber who died under mysterious circumstances

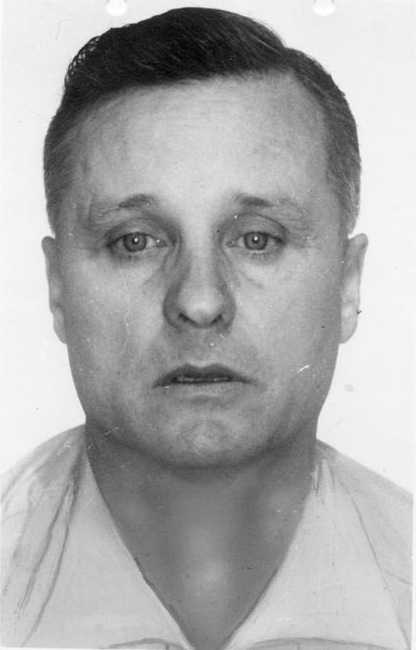
- A headshot of Frederick Grant Dunn
- Born: 1905; Iowa, United States
- Died: 1959 (aged 53–54) near Ellsworth, Kansas
- Cause of death: Murdered
- Other name: The Modern John Dillinger
- Occupations: Bank robber and burglar

Frederick Grant Dunn (1905–1959) was an American criminal, burglar and bank robber whose career spanned over four decades from 1919 until his mysterious death in 1959. He led a small gang during the 1940s and 1950s, Dunn becoming referred to by the press as "the modern John Dillinger", and whose activities eventually resulted in his being listed on the FBI's Ten Most Wanted in 1958.

== Biography ==
=== Early life and criminal career ===
Born in 1905, Frederick Dunn's criminal career began when he was convicted of breaking and entering and larceny at the age of 14. He was sent to the Iowa Training School for Boys at Eldora, Iowa and remained there for five years, being paroled in 1921, and eventually discharged in 1924. Two months after leaving the school, he was arrested with two others for attempting to burglarize a general store in Gayville, South Dakota. The owner confronted Dunn and his two partners, firing at them with a gun and hitting one of the would-be robbers in the eye, with Dunn and his wounded friend being arrested by police. The two were convicted of burglary in November of that year and sentenced to five years in South Dakota state prison. Dunn was released on parole in 1927 but was returned to prison a year later following his arrest in Omaha for a parole violation.

=== Robbery in Sioux City ===
He was released in August 1929 and linked to a bank robbery in Salix, Iowa after only a few weeks. In Sioux City, three weeks later, he and a masked accomplice robbed a store on the outskirts of town. Upon entering the store, Dunn fired a shot into the ceiling and escaped with $67. Early the following year, he and another man robbed a suburban bank also near Sioux City. In February 1930, Dunn was picked up in Chicago and returned to Iowa for trial. Ten days after his arrival in Sioux City, Dunn managed to obtain a smuggled pistol and escaped with another inmate. One of the guards was shot in the thigh when he attempted to stop Dunn.

Managing to elude authorities for a few hours, Dunn was confronted by police later that day. He was surprised by sheriff's deputies in a nearby alley and surrendered after a brief shootout. Dunn was eventually given a 40-year prison sentence for bank robbery as well as an additional 30 years for "assault with intent to kill" as a result of his escape attempt. He was sent to the Iowa state prison in Fort Madison in March 1930 where he remained until his parole in June 1940.

=== Crime spree in Kansas ===
Dunn quickly returned to crime and, within two years, was being referred to as a "modern-day [John] Dillinger" for his skill in using nitroglycerine in blowing open safes. On July 2, 1942, he and two others robbed $2,861 from a bank in Portis, Kansas. Although they locked everyone in the vault, one of the bank owners, Carl Thomas, managed to get free and grabbed a rifle which he used to wound one of the robbers as they made their getaway. They later lost the car outside town when the driver suddenly swerved and sent the car rolling over several times. A second getaway car was nearby allowing Dunn and the others to escape.

Less than three weeks later, Dunn and his partners were arrested by federal agents in Denver, Colorado on July 21, 1942. He and the rest of his gang were convicted on federal charges and received 15 years. Two women associated with the gang were also charged as accessories and sentenced to six years each. Prior to sentencing, hacksaw blades were found in Dunn's cell and he later confessed to planning a jail break.

=== The "Modern Dillinger" and the FBI ===
Dunn was imprisoned in Leavenworth federal penitentiary in Kansas and spent a decade there until his parole in November 1952. Within seven months, an arrest warrant was issued for a parole violation. He was found living in Kansas City in January 1954 and arrested on a weapons charge. He was brought back to Leavenworth to complete his sentence. Dunn was finally released on August 16, 1957.

He was accused of burglarizing a store in Westphalia, Iowa, but no charges were brought against him. He was, however, arrested in Russell, Kansas on November 21 in connection with another burglary in nearby Palco. He was indicted on that charge six days later and transferred to the county lockup in Lincoln. While awaiting trial for the burglary of a grocery store in Sylvan Grove, he escaped from custody on January 11, 1958.

The FBI put out an arrest warrant charging him with "unlawful flight to escape prosecution" five days later and, on July 29, officially added him to the FBI Top Most Wanted. Their investigation soon ran cold, however, Dunn seemingly having disappeared. It was presumed by authorities that he had fled the state after his escape.

On September 7, 1959, his skeletal remains were found near Ellsworth and confirmed by a post-mortem examination two weeks later. With Dunn not having left Kansas after all, there was some speculation that he had committed suicide, but the cause of death was ultimately ruled as murder.

== See also ==
- List of unsolved murders (1900–1979)
