= Crahan Denton =

American actor (1914–1966)

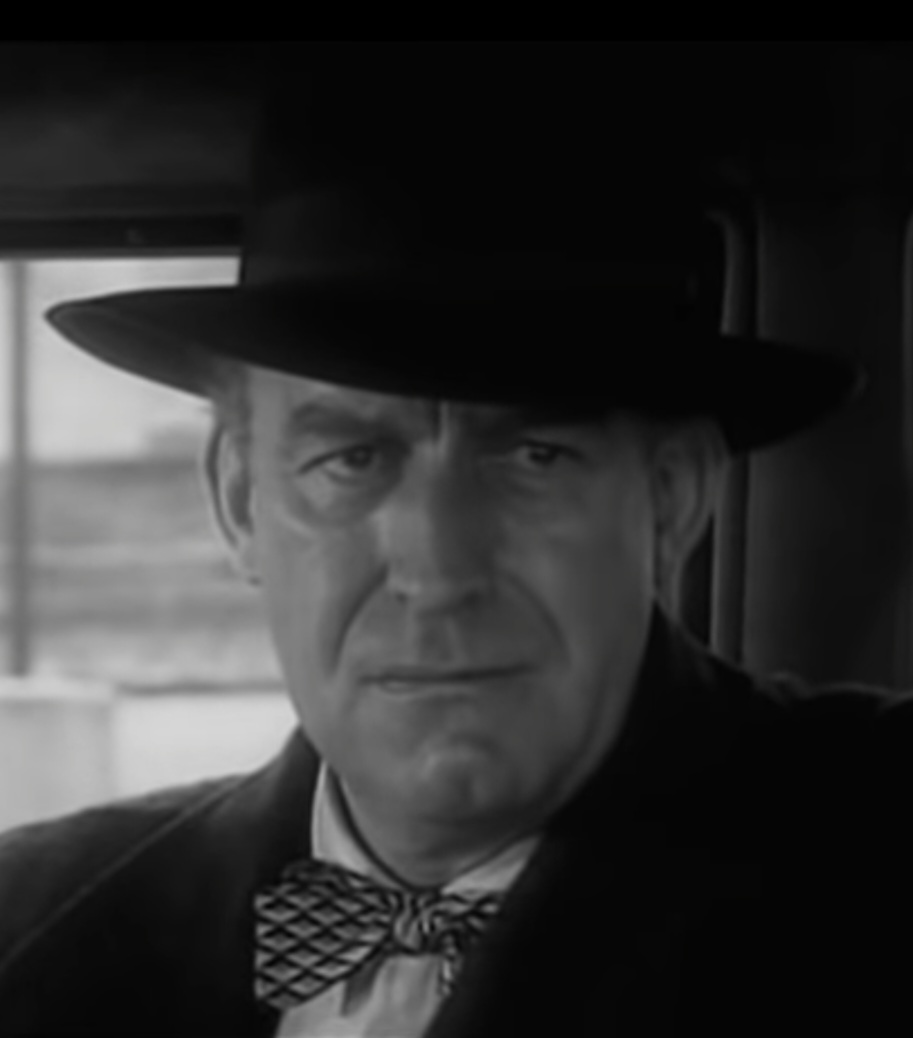
- Denton in The Great St. Louis Bank Robbery (1959)
- Born: Arthur Denton; March 20, 1914; Seattle, Washington, U.S.
- Died: December 4, 1966 (aged 52); Piedmont, California, U.S.
- Occupation: Actor
- Years active: 1945-1965
- Spouse: Eleanor Brown (m. 1955)

Crahan Denton (pronunciation: "kran"; born Arthur Crahan Denton; March 20, 1914 – December 4, 1966) was an American stage, film, and television actor. One of his famous film roles was in To Kill a Mockingbird (1962), in which he portrayed Walter Cunningham, a client of the main character, lawyer Atticus Finch. Walter is the leader of a mob that attempts to lynch another one of Finch's clients.

He had a number of roles in Broadway plays, and he won an Outer Critics Circle Award for Best Performances in Supporting Roles for 1954-1955 for his work in Bus Stop (1955).

== Early years ==
Born Arthur Crahan Denton in Seattle, Washington, he was the son of Arthur P. Denton (born in New York) and his wife May (nee Graham; born in Montana). He and his parents later moved to Piedmont, California.

Denton studied drama at the University of California, Berkeley. He moved to New York City, where he studied at the Neighborhood Playhouse School of the Theatre. In his acting career, Denton used his middle name Crahan, an Irish surname in his family, as his first name.

== Career ==
Denton was active in Little Theater productions during his time as a student at the University of California, Berkeley. In New York, he gradually gained stage roles, with Broadway credits including Key Largo (1940), Liberty Jones (1941), Fragile Fox (1954), Bus Stop (1955), Orpheus Descending (1957), and Winesburg, Ohio (1958).

From 1945 until his death in 1966, Denton starred in many films, including The Great St. Louis Bank Robbery (1959), The Parent Trap (1961), Birdman of Alcatraz (1962), To Kill a Mockingbird (1962), and Bus Riley's Back in Town.

During May 1952, he starred as Abraham Lincoln in an episode of American Inventory that was a preview of a pilot for a proposed series. He also performed as a guest star in many television series, including Bonanza (1961 episode "The Secret"), Alfred Hitchcock Presents, Gunsmoke (as a homicidal outlaw in the episode “Apprentice Doc” and as “Walker, a murderer in the episode “Blind Man’s Bluff”), Have Gun Will Travel, The Fugitive, and The Donna Reed Show (1962 episode "Once upon a Timepiece"). In 1960, he co-starred in an unsold pilot titled Mountain Man about fur trading in the 1840s. Denton made two guest appearance in the series Perry Mason.

== Personal life ==
Denton married Eleanor Brown in 1955 in New York City.

== Death ==
In 1966, Denton died at age 52 after suffering a heart attack in Piedmont, California.

== Filmography ==
Title|			Notes
Crime, Inc.	1945	Vannie Denton	uncredited
The Great St. Louis Bank Robbery	1959	John Egan	
The Young One	1960	Jackson	
Alfred Hitchcock Presents	1961	Monty, the Sheriff	Season 6, Episode 23: "Incident in a Small Jail"
Alfred Hitchcock Presents	1961	Harry Beggs	Season 6, Episode 35: "Coming Home"
The Parent Trap	1961	Hecky	
Walk on the Wild Side	1962	Bit Part	uncredited
Birdman of Alcatraz	1962	Kramer	
To Kill a Mockingbird	1962	Walter Cunningham Sr.	
The Alfred Hitchcock Hour	1963	Sheriff Walter Watson	Season 1, Episode 24: "The Star Juror"
Hud	1963	Jesse	
Captain Newman, M.D.	1963	Major Snowden	
Bus Riley's Back in Town	1965	Spencer	
