= Willie Sutton =

American bank robber (1901–1980)

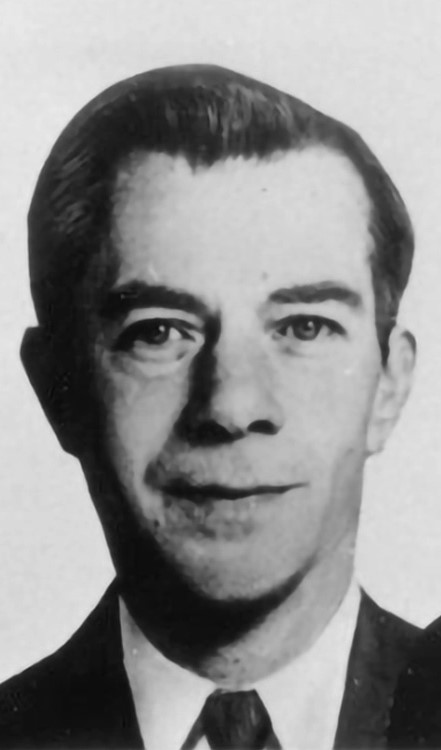

FBI Ten Most Wanted Fugitive
- Charges: Bank robbery
- Alias: "Willie the Actor" "Slick Willie"; William Bowles; James Clayton; Richard Courtney; Leo Holland; Julian Loring

Description
- Born: William Francis Sutton Jr. June 30, 1901; Brooklyn, New York, U.S.
- Died: November 2, 1980 (aged 79); Spring Hill, Florida, U.S.

Status
- Added: March 20, 1950
- Caught: February 1952
- Number: 11
- Captured

William Francis Sutton Jr. (June 30, 1901 – November 2, 1980) was an American bank robber. During his forty-year robbery career he stole an estimated $2 million, and he eventually spent more than half of his adult life in prison and escaped three times. For his talent at executing robberies in disguises, he gained two nicknames, "Willie the Actor" and "Slick Willie". Sutton is also known as the namesake of the so-called Sutton's law, although he denied originating it.

== Early life ==
Sutton was born into an Irish-American family on June 30, 1901 in Brooklyn, New York, to William Francis Sutton Sr., a blacksmith, and Mary Ellen Bowles. His family lived on the corner of Gold and Nassau Streets in the neighborhood of Irishtown, Brooklyn, now called Vinegar Hill. According to his biography, Where the Money Was, at the age of three the family relocated to High Street. His mother was, according to the biography, born in Ireland; however, according to the 1910 U.S. Census, she was born in Maryland and her parents were born in Ireland. By 1910, she had given birth to five children, of whom three were still alive. According to the 1910 Census, his maternal grandfather, James Bowles, and his two maternal uncles were also living with the family. Sutton was the fourth of five children, and did not attend school after the 8th grade.

== Career in crime ==
Sutton became a criminal at an early age, though throughout his professional criminal career, he did not kill anyone. He was described by Mafioso Donald Frankos as "a little bright-eyed guy, just 5'7" and always talking, chain-smoking ... cigarettes with Bull Durham tobacco." Frankos stated also that Sutton "dispensed mounds of legal advice" to any convict willing to listen. Inmates considered Sutton a "wise old head" in the prison population. When incarcerated at "The Tombs" (Manhattan House of Detention) he did not have to worry about assault because Mafia friends protected him. In conversation with Donald Frankos he would sadly reminisce about the 1920s and 1930s when he was most active in robbing banks and would always tell fellow convicts that in his opinion, during the days of Al Capone and Lucky Luciano, the criminals were the bloodiest. Gangsters from the time period, and many incarcerated organized crime inmates, enjoyed having Sutton for companionship. He was witty and non-violent. Frankos declared that Sutton made legendary bank thieves Jesse James and John Dillinger seem like amateurs.

Sutton was an accomplished bank robber. He usually carried a pistol or a Thompson submachine gun. "You can't rob a bank on charm and personality," he once observed. In an interview in the Reader's Digest published shortly before his death, Sutton was asked if the guns that he used in his robberies were loaded. He responded that he never carried a loaded gun because somebody might get hurt. He stole from the rich and kept it, though public opinion later made him into a type of gentleman thief, like Robin Hood. He allegedly never robbed a bank when a woman screamed or a baby cried.

Sutton was captured and recommitted in June 1931, charged with assault and robbery. He failed to complete his 30-year sentence, however, escaping on December 11, 1932, using a smuggled gun and holding a prison guard hostage. With the guard as leverage, Sutton acquired a 45-ft (13.5 meter) ladder to scale the 30-ft (9 meter) wall of the prison grounds.

On February 15, 1933, Sutton attempted to rob the Corn Exchange Bank and Trust Company in Philadelphia, Pennsylvania. He entered the bank disguised as a postman. An alert passerby foiled the crime, however, but Sutton made an escape. On January 15, 1934, he and two companions broke into the same bank through a skylight.

The FBI record observes:

Sutton also conducted a Broadway jewelry store robbery in broad daylight, impersonating a postal telegraph messenger. Sutton's other disguises included a police officer, messenger and maintenance man. He usually arrived at banks or stores shortly before they opened for business.

Sutton was apprehended on February 5, 1934, and was sentenced to serve 25 to 50 years in the Eastern State Penitentiary in Philadelphia, Pennsylvania, for the machine gun robbery of the Corn Exchange Bank. On April 3, 1945, Sutton was one of 12 convicts who escaped the institution through a tunnel. The convicts broke through to the other side during daylight hours, and were spotted immediately by a passing police patrol. The 12 men were forced to quickly flee the scene, with all being quickly apprehended. Sutton was recaptured the same day by Philadelphia police officer Mark Kehoe.

Sentenced to life imprisonment as a fourth time offender, Sutton was transferred to the Philadelphia County Prison, Holmesburg section of Philadelphia, Pennsylvania. On February 10, 1947, Sutton and other prisoners dressed as prison guards carried two ladders across the prison yard to the wall after dark. When the prison's searchlights hit him, Sutton yelled, "It's all right!" No one stopped him.

To assist with one of his prison escape attempts, Sutton fashioned a dummy head and hand in his own likeness that he placed in his cot in an attempt to fool the guards. He used real human hair, acquired from the barber and himself, on the head and for the eyelashes. The head and hand have since become collectors items valued in 2018 between $8,000 and $10,000.

On March 20, 1950, Sutton was the eleventh listed of the FBI's Ten Most Wanted Fugitives, created only a week earlier, on March 14.

During February 1952, Sutton was captured by police after having been recognized on a subway and followed by Arnold Schuster, a 24-year-old Brooklyn clothing salesman and amateur detective. Schuster later appeared on television and described how he had assisted in Sutton's apprehension. Albert Anastasia, Mafia boss of the Gambino crime family, disliked Schuster because he was a "rat" and a "squealer." According to Mafia renegade and first major government informant, Joe Valachi, Anastasia ordered the murder of Schuster, who was then shot dead outside his home on March 9, 1952.

Judge Peter T. Farrell presided over a 1952 trial in which Sutton was convicted of the 1950 robbery of $63,942 (equivalent to $855,655 in 2025) from a bank of the Manufacturers Trust Company in Sunnyside, Queens. He received a sentence of 30 to 120 years in Attica State Prison.

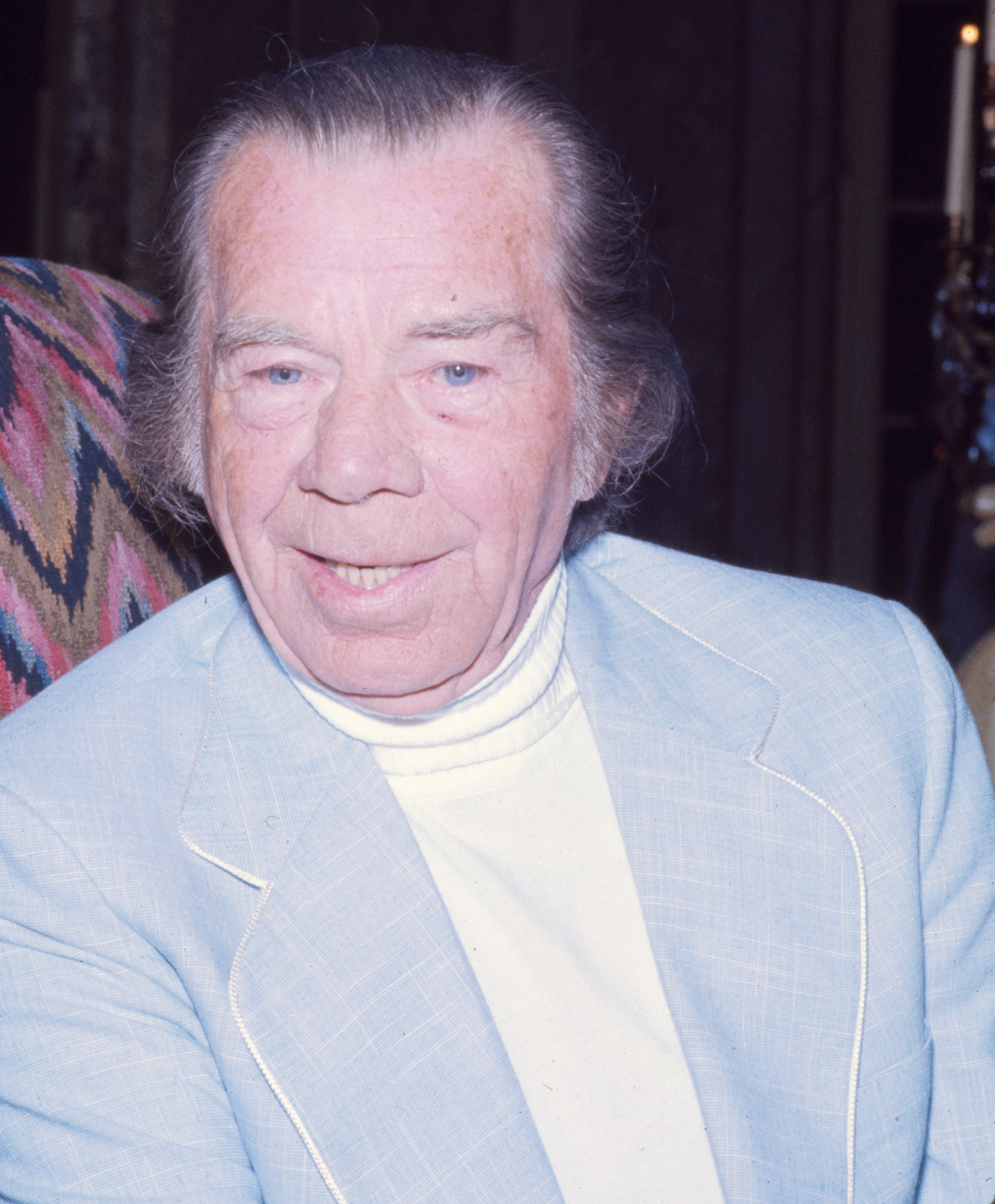
Sutton in 1966

While in prison, Sutton wrote I, Willie Sutton, a book about his life and career. Co-authored with Quentin Reynolds, the book was published in 1953.

In December of 1969, Farrell ruled that Sutton's good behavior, along with his deteriorating health, justified commuting his sentence to time served. At the hearing Sutton responded, "Thank you, your Honor. God bless you," and wept as he was led out of the court building.

In 1976, Sutton published his second book, Where the Money Was, co-authored with journalist Ed Linn.

After his release, Sutton delivered lectures on prison reform and consulted with banks on theft-deterrent techniques. He made a television commercial for New Britain Bank and Trust Company in Connecticut for their credit card with picture identification on it. His lines were, "They call it the 'face card.' Now when I say I'm Willie Sutton, people believe me."

== Personal life and death ==
Sutton married Louise Leudemann in 1929. She divorced him while he was in jail. Their daughter Jeanie was born the next year. His second wife was Olga Kowalska, whom he married in 1933. His longest period of (legal) employment lasted for 18 months.

A series of decisions by the United States Supreme Court during the 1960s resulted in his release on Christmas Eve, 1969, from Attica State Prison. He was in ill health at the time, suffering from emphysema and in need of an operation on the arteries of his legs.

Sutton died in 1980 at the age of 79; before this, he had spent his last years with his sister in Spring Hill, Florida. He frequented the Spring Hill Restaurant where he kept to himself. After Sutton's death, his family arranged a quiet burial in Brooklyn in the family plot.

== "Sutton's law" ==
A famous apocryphal story is that Sutton was asked by reporter Mitch Ohnstad why he robbed banks. According to Ohnstad, he replied, "Because that's where the money is." The quote evolved into Sutton's law, which is often invoked to medical students as a metaphor for emphasizing the most likely diagnosis, rather than wasting time and money investigating every conceivable possibility.

In his autobiography, Sutton denied originating the pithy rejoinder:

The irony of using a bank robber's maxim as an instrument for teaching medicine is compounded, I will now confess, by the fact that I never said it. The credit belongs to some enterprising reporter who apparently felt a need to fill out his copy. I can't even remember where I first read it. It just seemed to appear one day, and then it was everywhere. If anybody had asked me, I'd have probably said it. That's what almost anybody would say ... it couldn't be more obvious.

However, he also said:

Why did I rob banks? Because I enjoyed it. I loved it. I was more alive when I was inside a bank, robbing it, than at any other time in my life. I enjoyed everything about it so much that one or two weeks later I'd be out looking for the next job. But to me the money was the chips, that's all.

The Redlands Daily Facts published the earliest documented example of Sutton's law on March 15, 1952, in Redlands, California.

A corollary, the "Willie Sutton rule", used in management accounting, stipulates that activity-based costing (in which activities are prioritized by necessity and budgeted accordingly) should be applied where the greatest costs occur, because that is where the greatest savings can be found.
