= David Dallas Taylor =

American murderer (1926–1983)

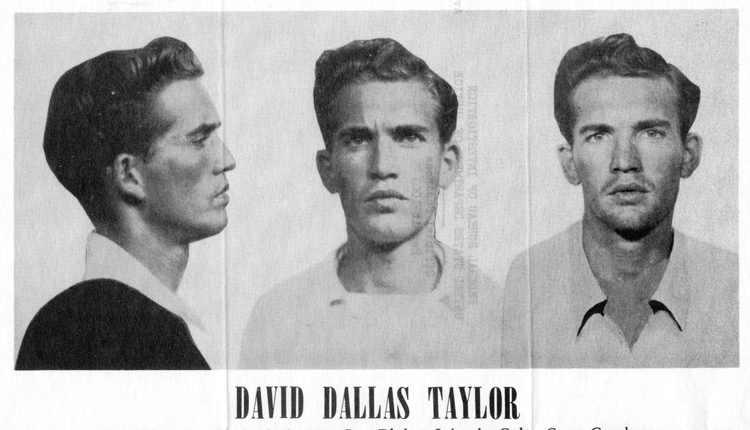

FBI Ten Most Wanted Fugitive
- Charges: Murder
- Alias: Johnnie Cole; Joe Blake; Jimmie Green; Charles J. Raymond

Description
- Born: December 15, 1926; Cullman County, Alabama
- Died: August 11, 1983 (aged 56); Jasper, Alabama
- Nationality: American
- Race: White
- Gender: Male
- Height: 5 ft 11 in (180 cm)
- Weight: 144 lb (65 kg)

Status
- Added: March 3, 1953
- Caught: May 26, 1953
- Number: 44
- Captured

David Dallas Taylor (December 15, 1926 – August 11, 1983) was an American murderer who was on the FBI Ten Most Wanted Fugitives list in 1953.

== Background ==
David Dallas Taylor was a career criminal who had held jobs as a service station attendant, electrician, plumber, autobody repairman, and grill man in restaurants. While serving a two-year term for grand larceny, he escaped with another inmate on June 25, 1948, which led to the death of an elderly prison guard when he was hit over the head with a weight. He was captured and received a new prison term of 20 years for second degree murder and 12 years for grand larceny. On August 7, 1950, he and another inmate escaped again by stealing a dump truck from the prison farm they were assigned to. His accomplice was arrested, but Taylor fled to Kentucky and started forging checks stolen from a construction company with his brother-in-law across multiple states. He was arrested sometime later. On September 14, 1951, he escaped with 18 others in a mass breakout by breaking into the prison vault and stealing the cache of guns. On August 16, 1952, he was arrested while attempting to sell a stolen car. Taylor was a "persuasive talker" with a Southern accent who was always armed with a gun and switchblade.

== Escape and capture ==
On September 1, 1952, while being transported from Chicago, Illinois, back to Alabama, he jumped off a moving train while handcuffed. He was added to the list on March 3, 1953. He was captured by FBI agents on May 26, 1953, in Chicago while "caught in a traffic jam". In November 1953, he was sentenced to three years in federal prison after being convicted of fleeing across state lines to avoid prosecution.
