= Joseph Franklin Bent =

American robber

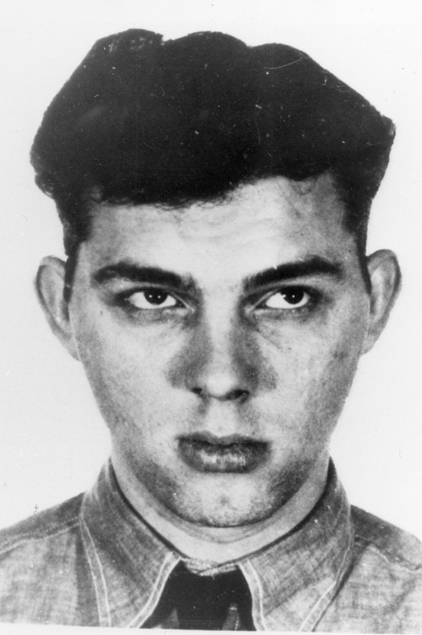

FBI Ten Most Wanted Fugitive
- Charges: Robbery; Attempted murder
- Alias: Charles Rayborn, Hap; Coal Frederick Raymond

Description
- Born: Joseph Franklin Bent Jr. November 30, 1927; Clay County, Missouri
- Died: May 7, 2004 (aged 76); California, U.S.
- Nationality: (United States) American
- Gender: M
- Height: 6 ft 1 in (185 cm)
- Weight: 175 to 185 lb
- Occupation: Fireman; fisherman; railway switch man; truck driver

Status
- Added: January 9, 1951
- Caught: August 29, 1952
- Number: 18
- Captured

Joseph Franklin Bent Jr. (November 30, 1927 – May 7, 2004) was a robber who was on the FBI Ten Most Wanted Fugitives list in 1951. He had robbed a grocery store in San Diego, California and while an accomplice drive a getaway car, shot at pursuing police with a shotgun.

== Background ==
He was also known by the aliases Charles "Hap" Rayborn and Coal Frederick Raymond (among others); the FBI had not tied these names to Bent, a veteran robber, until 16 months after his addition to the Ten Most Wanted list on January 9, 1951. He was added under the charges of robbery, attempted murder, and unlawful flight to avoid prosecution after escaping jail in Gretna, Louisiana.

On March 6, 1946, he enlisted in the United States Army at San Antonio, Texas, but was discharged after less than one month service when he was arrested for robbing a post office sub-station in Grand Junction, Colorado. At the time of his arrest, Bent admitted to 20 armed robberies in the Kansas City area between January 2, 1946, and February 21, 1946, where he made off with approximately $2,000. He was sentenced to 25 years for the post office robbery, but due to an error in the indictment, the judge ordered his release early on June 20, 1949. However, the Court of Appeals ruled his conviction should stand and ordered him back to Leavenworth Prison. He then fled to California.

== Capture and aftermath ==
Bent was captured in Texas City, Texas, on August 29, 1952, on the advice of a tip from Alaska that had placed him in Monterrey, Mexico. When two agents attempted to arrest him in his apartment, Bent began to run and appeared to attempt to draw a weapon (he later turned out to be unarmed) and was shot once and wounded in the leg. He was tackled by the agents and eventually apprehended. Bent previously served time at United States Penitentiary, Leavenworth and Alcatraz Federal Penitentiary for his heists. His previous occupations included a fireman, fisherman, railway switch man, and truck driver. He died in 2004 in California.
