= List of New York state senators =

This is a complete list of members of the New York State Senate, past and present.

Senator	Years	District	Party	Lifespan	Notes
Catherine M. Abate	1995–1998	27	Democratic	1947–2014	
Peter A. Abeles	1919–1920	22	Republican	1886–1952	
Chauncey M. Abbott	1862–1863	25	Republican	1822–1863	
Frank Abbott	1874	10	Liberal Republican	1828–1893	
David H. Abell	1860–1861	30	Republican	1807–1872	
Gary Ackerman	1979–1983	12	Democratic	1942–	
Donald R. Ackerson	1973–1974	35	Republican	1921–1996	
Joseph Ackroyd	1907–1908	36	Democratic	1847–1915	
Charles H. Adams	1872–1873	13	Republican	1824–1902	
Eric Adams	2007–2013	20	Democratic	1960–	
Levi Adams	1818–1821	Eastern		1762–1831	
Peter C. Adams					
Platt Adams	1848–1849	10	Democratic	1792–1887	
William E. Adams	1966, 1967–1970	53, 61	Republican		
Joseph Addabbo Jr.	2009–	15	Democratic	1964–	
John Addison (New York)	1797–1800	Middle			
Frank F. Adel	1919	2	Democratic	1884–1967	
Abraham Adriance	1802–1806	Middle		1766–1825	
George B. Agnew	1907–1910	17	Republican	1868–1941	
Edward J. Ahearn	1931–1932	14	Democratic	1891–1934	
John F. Ahearn	1890–1902	6, 8, 10	Democratic	1853–1920	
Fred Akshar	2015–2022	52	Republican	1978–	
Daniel G. Albert	1956–1962	2	Republican	1901–1983	
Marisol Alcantara	2017–2018	31	Democratic		
James S. Alesi	1996–2012	55	Republican	1948–	
Orson M. Allaben	1864–1865	14	Democratic	1808–1891	
Jotham P. Allds	1903–1910	26, 27, 37	Republican	1865–1923	
David Allen (New York politician)	1815–1819	Eastern			
Ethan B. Allen	1826–1829		Democratic–Republican	1781–1835	
Mark W. Allen	1923–1924	24	Democratic	1877–1958	
Norman M. Allen	1864–65, 1872–73, 1882–83	32	Republican, Liberal Republican	1828–1909	
Stephen Allen	1829–1832		Jacksonian	1767–1852	
Victor M. Allen	1909–1912	29	Republican	1870–1916	
William Allison	1782–1786	Middle			
Charles Alt					
Henry S. Ambler	1899–1905	24	Republican	1836–1905	
George A. Amedore Jr.	2015–2020	46	Republican	1969–	
Cheney Ames	1858–59, 1864–65	21	Republican	1808–1892	
DeHart H. Ames	1921–1924	39	Republican	1872–1955	
Samuel Ames	1872–1873	16	Republican	1824–1875	
Floyd E. Anderson	1943–1944; 1945–1951	40, 45	Republican	1891–1976	
Warren M. Anderson	1953–1988		Republican	1915–2007	
Carl Andrews	2002–2006	20	Democratic	1956–	
George H. Andrews	1864–1867	20		1821–1885	
Wilkes Angel	1862–1865	30	Republican	1817–1889	
Joseph Annin					
Benjamin Antin	1923–1930	22	Democratic	1884–1956	
Bob Antonacci	2018–2019	50	Republican		
Julius A. Archibald	1953–1954			1901–1979	First African-American member of the New York Senate
George F. Argetsinger	1911–1918	45	Republican	1874–1951	
James Arkell	1863–1866	18	Republican	1829–1911	
Christian H. Armbruster	1966		Republican	1921–1986	
Thomas Armstrong	1830–1837	7		1785–1867	
William W. Armstrong	1899–1908	44, 46	Republican	1864–1944	
Abraham Arndt					
Elisha Arnold					
Frank B. Arnold					
Jake Ashby	2023–	43	Republican		
Joseph Aspinall					
William Waldorf Astor	1880–1881	10	Republican	1848–1919	
Russell Attwater					
Darrel Aubertine	2008–2010	48	Democratic	1953–	
Arthur J. Audett					
Martin S. Auer					
Willard S. Augsbury					
Moses Austin (New York)					
Tony Avella	2011–2019	11	Democratic	1951–	
Allen Ayrault					
Caspar A. Baaden					
George R. Babcock					
Frederick F. Backus					
Alexander H. Bailey					
Jamaal Bailey	2017–	36	Democratic		
Edwin Bailey Jr.	1903–1904	1	Democratic		
Robert S. Bainbridge					
Isaac V. Baker Jr.					
Michael Balboni	1998–2007		Republican	1959–	
Joseph C. Baldwin					
Sumner Baldwin					
Greg Ball	2011–2014	40	Republican	1977–	
James Ballantine					
John Ballard (New York)					
A. Bleecker Banks					
Charles F. Barager					
H. Douglas Barclay					
Bryce Barden					
Jacob Barker					
Elisha Barlow					
Thomas Barlow					
Robert A. Barnard					
William D. Barnes					
James Barnett					
Stephen Barnum					
Thomas J. Barr					
Elisha T. Barrett	1957–1966	1, 3	Republican	1902–1966	
Gamaliel H. Barstow					
Henry E. Bartlett					
William Bartlit					
Thomas J. Bartosiewicz					
Stephen Bates					
Alexander B. Baucus					
Stanley J. Bauer					
Lester Baum					
Caleb H. Baumes					
Alexander G. Baxter					
Howard R. Bayne					
George Beach					
Nelson J. Beach					
William Beach					
John Beardsley					
Levi Beardsley					
Samuel Beardsley					
Vander L. Beatty					
Karl K. Bechtold					
Abijah Beckwith					
James William Beekman					
John P. Beekman					
William Beekman					
George D. Beers					
Owen M. Begley					
James A. Bell					
Carol Bellamy					
Frederick P. Bellinger					
Erastus C. Benedict					
Brian Benjamin	2017–2021	30	Democratic		
David S. Bennett					
Harmon Bennett					
John D. Bennett					
Louis Bennett					
William M. Bennett					
Nathaniel S. Benton					
Julius S. Berg					
Max Berking					
Albert Berkowitz					
Carol Berman					
Frederic S. Berman					
Abraham Bernstein					
John M. Betts					
William Bewley					
Alessandra Biaggi	2019–2022	34	Democratic		
William J. Bianchi					
Bennet Bicknell					
Bennett Bicknell					
John Birdsall					
John Birdsall					
Victory Birdseye					
James W. Birkett					
Isaac W. Bishop					
Kitchel Bishop					
William S. Bishop					
Francis M. Bixby					
Loring M. Black Jr.					
Ebenezer Blakely					
George A. Blauvelt					
Isaiah Blood					
Clarence E. Bloodgood					
Francis A. Bloodgood					
Henry Bloom					
Isaac Bloom					
Jeremiah B. Bloom					
Allen J. Bloomfield					
George Blumberg					
Truman Boardman					
Abraham Bockee					
Robert Bogardus					
Leon Bogues					
David A. Bokee					
John Bonacic	1999–2018	50, 52	Republican	1942–	
Thomas H. Bond					
Thomas Hinckley Bond					
Frederic H. Bontecou					
Paul P. E. Bookson					
James W. Booth					
George Borrello	2019–	57	Republican	1967–	
William C. Bouck					
George H. Boughton					
Arthur F. Bouton					
George Bowen					
Shepard P. Bowen					
Silas Bowker					
John Bowman					
Frank M. Boyce					
John G. Boyd					
John J. Boylan					
Earl E. Boyle					
Phil Boyle	2013–2022	4	Republican	1961–	
Edgar T. Brackett					
George W. Bradford					
Daniel Bradley					
George B. Bradley					
John J. Bradley					
John M. Braisted Jr.					
Waters W. Braman					
William H. Brand					
Benjamin Brandreth					
George Brayton					
Orlo M. Brees					
Thomas G. Brennan					
William C. Brennan					
Henry E. H. Brereton					
Neil Breslin	1997–2024	42, 46, 44	Democratic	1942–	
Joshua H. Brett					
Samuel Brewster					
Amos Briggs					
Nathan Bristol					
Leonard Bronck	1796–1800	Eastern			
Alvin Bronson					
Jack E. Bronston					
Erastus Brooks					
John Brooks	2017–2022	4	Democratic		
John Broome					
Alexander Brough					
Adon P. Brown					
Byron Brown					
Elon R. Brown					
Lowell H. Brown					
Thomas C. Brown					
Walter L. Brown					
William Horace Brown					
William L. Brown					
John W. Browning					
John W. Brownson					
Irwin Brownstein					
Joseph Bruno	1977–2006	41, 43	Republican	1929–2020	
George W. Brush					
Jacobus S. Bruyn					
Johannes Bruyn					
Earl Brydges					
John L. Buckley					
Salmon Buell					
Thomas Burch (New York)					
Thomas F. Burchill	1925–1938	13	Democratic	1882–1955	
George B. Burd					
Edward I. Burhans					
Stephen F. Burkard					
George T. Burling					
Alvah W. Burlingame Jr.					
Charles O. Burney Jr.					
Clark Burnham					
J. Irving Burns					
Carll S. Burr Jr.	1905–1908	1	Republican	1858–1936	
Latham A. Burrows					
Karen Burstein					
James Burt (assemblyman)					
Walter C. Burton					
E. Ogden Bush					
John T. Bush					
Thomas H. Bussey					
Martin Butts					
Richard P. Byrne					
William T. Byrne					
John D. Caemmerer					
William J. A. Caffrey					
John D. Calandra					
William S. Calli					
Samuel Campbell					
Thomas F. Campbell					
Timothy J. Campbell					
William W. Campbell					
John Cantine					
Moses I. Cantine					
Peter Cantine Jr.					
Jacob A. Cantor					
Israel Carll					
David Carlucci	2011–2020		Democratic	1981–	
B. Platt Carpenter					
Francis M. Carpenter					
James Carpenter					
Charles H. Carroll					
Daniel J. Carroll					
Thomas B. Carroll					
William A. Carson					
William B. Carswell					
Trumbull Cary					
Owen Cassidy					
William Cauldwell					
George Chahoon					
Calvin T. Chamberlain					
George Chambers					
Orlow W. Chapman					
Norton Chase					
Thomas I. Chatfield					
Nelson W. Cheney					
John Lewis Childs	1894–1895	1	Republican	1856–1921	
Perry G. Childs					
Lemuel Chipman					
Robert Christie Jr.					
Cosmo A. Cilano					
Ebenezer Clark	1796–1802	Eastern			
Henry A. Clark					
Jesse Clark					
Joseph Clark					
Myron H. Clark					
Orville Clark					
Thomas E. Clark					
William Clark					
William Clark (Wayne County, NY)					
Zenas Clark					
Archibald S. Clarke					
Matthew Clarkson					
DeWitt Clinton					
Herbert P. Coats					
George H. Cobb					
James Cochran					
Townsend D. Cock					
William W. Cocks					
Benjamin Coe (Newtown, NY)					
John D. Coe					
John W. Coe					
Michael J. Coffey					
Alexander J. Coffin					
Henry J. Coggeshall					
John P. Cohalan					
Cadwallader D. Colden					
A. Hyde Cole					
Dan H. Cole					
Ernest E. Cole					
Dennis R. Coleman					
Thomas Coleman					
John B. Coles					
Lorenzo D. Collins					
Michael F. Collins	1888–1891, 1894–1895	16	Democratic	1854–1928	
Charles Colt					
Andrew J. Colvin	1860–1861			1808–1889	
Frank Composto	1959–1962			1907–1995	
Leroy Comrie	2015–	14	Democratic	1958–	
Adam Comstock	1805–1809	Eastern			
Albert C. Comstock	1884–1887	16		1845–1910	
Barber Conable	1963–1964	53	Republican	1922–2003	
William F. Condon	1939–1964			1897–1972	
Abraham Bogart Conger	1851–1852	7	Democratic	1814–1887	
Benn Conger					
Jonathan S. Conklin					
William T. Conklin					
Henry C. Connelly					
Richard B. Connolly					
Martin Connor			Democratic		
William N. Conrad					
Charles D. Cook					
Charles Cook					
James M. Cook					
John H. Cooke					
Richard T. Cooke					
Walter E. Cooke					
James E. Cooley					
Charles Cooper (Brooklyn)					
Alfred Coppola					
Marc A. Coppola					
James A. Corcoran					
John N. Cordts					
Charles T. Corey					
Charles G. Cornell					
Ezra Cornell					
Francis R. E. Cornell					
George W. Cornell					
Erastus Corning 2nd			Democratic		
William J. Cornwell					
Vincent R. Corrou					
Salvatore A. Cotillo					
Frederic René Coudert Jr.					
Edward J. Coughlin					
James W. Covert					
Luke F. Cozans					
John Crary					
James J. Crawford					
Thomas J. Creamer					
James J. Crisona					
Franklin W. Cristman					
Thomas Croci	2015–2018		Republican		
Clarkson Crolius (state senator)					
George Cromwell					
Barth S. Cronin					
Thomas Crook					
Harman B. Cropsey					
Clarkson F. Crosby					
Darius Crosby					
John A. Cross					
Richard Crowley					
Henry Cruger					
Thomas J. Cuite	1953–1954; 1955–1958	8, 13	Democratic	1913–1987	
John J. Cullen	1884–1887	9	Democratic	1845–1896	
Mortimer A. Cullen	1945–1946	35	Democratic	1891–1954	
Thomas H. Cullen	1899–1918	3	Democratic	1868–1944	
Thomas F. Cunningham					
Henry M. Curran					
Edward V. Curry					
James C. Curtis					
Samuel C. Cuyler					
Albert Daggett					
Peter J. Dalessandro	1947–1954; 1955–1957	35, 36	Democratic	1918–1997	
William C. Daley					
James Daly					
John B. Daly					
Peter M. Daly					
Peter S. Danforth					
John P. Darling					
William A. Dart	1850–1851	15	Democratic	1814–1890	
Ashley Davenport	1852–1853	21	Democratic	1794–1874	
Frederick M. Davenport	1909–1910, 1919–1924	36	Republican	1866–1965	
Ira Davenport					
Andrew Davidson					
John Davidson (New York City)					
Charles Davis (New York state senator)					
David Floyd Davis					
George Allen Davis					
(Elkanah Day)	1780–1784	Eastern			
Theodore D. Day					
Charles Dayan					
Jesse C. Dayton					
Jonathan Dayton (New York)					
Jonathan Dayton					
Gilbert A. Deane					
John DeFrancisco	1993–2018		Republican		
Gordon J. DeHond					
William Denning					
Robert Denniston					
Mario M. DeOptatis					
John H. Derby					
Thomas C. Desmond					
Abraham A. Deyo					
Martin W. Deyo					
Rubén Díaz Sr.	2003–2017	32	Democratic	1943–	
Robert DiCarlo					
Homer E. A. Dick					
Andrew B. Dickinson					
Wells S. Dickinson					
Richard A. DiCostanzo					
Johannes Dietz					
William Dietz					
Martin Malave Dilan	2003–2019		Democratic		
Levi Dimmick					
John D. Ditmis					
Alexander S. Diven					
Abram Dixon					
William C. Dodge					
William I. Dodge					
John H. Doerr					
John Doherty					
Henry W. Doll					
Isidore Dollinger					
Richard A. Dollinger					
D. Clinton Dominick III					
Harvey J. Donaldson					
Thomas F. Donnelly					
James G. Donovan					
James H. Donovan					
John J. Donovan Jr.					
Benjamin Doolittle					
Daniel G. Dorrance					
Curtis N. Douglas					
Albert G. Dow					
Edward J. Dowling					
Victor J. Dowling					
John V. Downey					
Bernard Downing					
Coe S. Downing					
David E. Doyle					
Emmett L. Doyle					
Frederick E. Draper					
John Drescher Jr.					
James Duane	1782–1785; 1788–1790	Southern		1733–1797	
Thomas Duane	1999–2012	29	Democratic	1955–	
Charles E. Dudley					
Holland S. Duell					
William Duer	1777–1778	Eastern		1747–1799	
Thomas A. Duffy					
William Duggan (New York City)					
James F. Duhamel					
Thomas C. Dunham					
Harry F. Dunkel					
Thomas B. Dunn					
John R. Dunne					
John J. Dunnigan					
Perry B. Duryea	1942–1945	1	Republican	1891–1968	
John B. Dutcher					
Jonas Earll Jr.					
David Eason					
Lewis Eaton					
Thomas C. E. Ecclesine					
Fred J. Eckert					
Samuel S. Edick					
John W. Edmonds					
James T. Edwards					
Lewis A. Edwards					
Samuel L. Edwards					
Rae L. Egbert					
Ferdinand Eidman					
Stukely Ellsworth					
Timothy E. Ellsworth					
Lucas Elmendorf					
Nathaniel A. Elsberg					
Augustus R. Elwood					
Sumner Ely					
James A. Emerson					
Louis W. Emerson					
William N. Emerson	1876–1877	28th	Republican	1821–1891	
Carlos Emmons					
Matthias Endres					
Truman Enos					
Julian B. Erway					
Austin W. Erwin					
David Erwin					
George Z. Erwin					
Pedro Espada Jr.			Democratic		
Adriano Espaillat	2011–2016		Democratic		
Joseph A. Esquirol					
Edward S. Esty					
David Ellicott Evans					
David H. Evans					
Marcellus H. Evans					
Edward F. Fagan					
Alexander A. Falk					
Albert T. Fancher					
Sheldon Farber					
Hugh Farley	1977–2016	44	Republican		
Lysander Farrar					
Daniel F. Farrell					
John H. Farrell					
Peter T. Farrell					
August E. Farrenkopf					
Jacob Sloat Fassett					
James Faulkner					
George R. Fearon					
Maurice Featherson					
Louis Fechter, Sr.					
James D. Feeter					
Benjamin F. Feinberg					
A. Spencer Feld					
Simcha Felder	2013–		Democratic		
John W. Ferdon					
William J. Ferrall					
Nicholas Ferraro					
Mortimer Y. Ferris					
T. Harvey Ferris					
William H. Ferry					
Ben Field (New York)					
Thomas C. Fields					
Joshua Fiero Jr.					
William P. Fiero					
Andrew Finck					
John Fine					
Sidney A. Fine					
Paul A. Fino					
Leon A. Fischel					
Josiah Fisk					
James Fitzgerald					
James F. Fitzgerald					
John C. Fitzgerald					
John J. Flanagan	2003–2020	2	Republican		
Walter J. Floss Jr.					
David R. Floyd-Jones					
Edward Floyd-Jones	1892–1893	1	Democratic	1823–1901	
Henry Floyd-Jones					
John G. Floyd					
William Floyd	1777–1788, 1807–1808	Southern, Western		1734–1821	
John E. Flynn					
Brian X. Foley	2009–2010		Democratic		
James A. Foley					
John Foley (New York state senator)					
Samuel J. Foley					
Charles J. Folger					
George Folsom					
Jellis Fonda	1777–1778, 1779–1781, 1787–1791	Western		1727–1791	
Ebenezer Foote					
Isaac Foote					
John J. Foote					
John Ford					
George H. Forster					
Oliver Forward					
Henry A. Foster					
William Foster					
Charles A. Fowler					
J. Samuel Fowler					
Albert R. Fox					
Chauncey J. Fox					
George H. Fox					
John Fox					
Stanislaus P. Franchot					
Morris Franklin					
James J. Frawley					
Jacob S. Freer					
Charles A. Freiberg					
Henry J. Frey					
John Frey					
Louis L. Friedman					
Frank A. Frost					
Samuel H. Frost					
Samuel Frost (politician)					
Thomas Frothingham					
Charles H. Fuller					
Jerome Fuller					
Philo C. Fuller					
Rudolph C. Fuller					
Rich Funke	2015–2020		Republican	1949–	
John F. Furey					
Gabriel Furman					
Charles J. Fuschillo Jr.	1998–2013		Republican		
Joseph L. Galiber					
Frank Gallagher					
Raymond F. Gallagher					
Patrick M. Gallivan	2011–	59	Republican	1960–	
Leonard Gansevoort	1790–93, 1796–1802	Western, Eastern		1751–1810	
Peter Gansevoort					
John Ganson					
Robert Garcia					
David Gardiner					
Thomas A. Gardiner					
Frank J. Gardner					
William A. Gardner					
James A. Garrity					
Joseph Gasherie					
Enzo Gaspari					
Francis H. Gates					
John W. Gates					
Jim Gaughran	2019–		Democratic		
Anthony V. Gazzara					
Jacob Gebhard					
George Geddes					
David Gelston					
Henry W. Genet					
Vincent J. Gentile			Democratic		
James W. Gerard (state senator)					
Isaac Gere					
Frederick Gettman					
Michael Gianaris	2011–		Democratic		
Frederick S. Gibbs					
Leonard W. H. Gibbs					
James Gibson					
Jacob H. Gilbert					
John I. Gilbert					
William J. Gilbert					
William W. Gilbert					
Alfred J. Gilchrist					
Anthony B. Gioffre					
William J. Giordano					
Frank Giorgio					
Terry Gipson	2013–2014		Democratic		
Robert H. Gittins					
Harry Gittleson					
Leon E. Giuffreda	1966–1976	1	Republican	1913–1999	
Reuben L. Gledhill					
Frank J. Glinski					
Abel Godard					
Frank N. Godfrey					
Louis S. Goebel					
Emanuel R. Gold					
Thomas R. Gold					
Marty Golden	2003–2018		Republican		
Harrison J. Goldin					
Efrain Gonzalez Jr.			Democratic		
Mary B. Goodhue					
Roy M. Goodman	1969–2002		Republican	1930–2014	
Louis F. Goodsell					
Alexander T. Goodwin					
William H. Goodwin					
Bernard G. Gordon					
James Gordon	1796–1804	Western, Eastern		1739–1810	
Janet Hill Gordon					
Archie A. Gorfinkel					
Ephraim Goss					
Andrew Gounardes			Democratic		
Thomas F. Grady					
James G. Graham					
James H. Graham					
William M. Graham					
William J. Graney					
Gideon Granger					
John Grant (New York state senator)					
Robert Y. Grant					
William J. Grattan					
Paul D. Graves					
Rhoda Fox Graves					
Ross Graves					
E. Arthur Gray					
Byram Green					
George E. Green					
Abraham Greenberg					
Samuel L. Greenberg					
Thomas Greenly					
William P. Greiner					
Abraham Gridley					
Anthony J. Griffin					
James D. Griffin					
John Griffin					
Frederick W. Griffith					
Henry W. Griffith					
Joseph Griffo	2007–		Republican		
Mark Grisanti	2011–2014				
Stephen M. Griswold					
Robert C. Groben					
Jacob A. Gross					
George B. Guinnip					
Abraham Gurnee					
Daniel Gutman					
Charles L. Guy					
Edward P. Hagan					
Henry Hager (assemblyman)					
Peter Hager II					
Jacob Haight					
Samuel Haight (Greene County, NY)					
Samuel Haight					
Edwin G. Halbert					
John K. Hale					
Matthew Hale					
Amos Hall					
Samuel H. P. Hall					
William Hall (New York City)					
Morris S. Halliday					
Donald Halperin					
Seymour Halpern					
Hugh Halsey					
Jehiel H. Halsey					
Silas Halsey					
Joseph Halstead					
John B. Halsted					
Charles Mann Hamilton					
James A. Hamilton					
Jesse Hamilton	2015–2018		Democratic		
Frederic E. Hammer					
Chauncey B. Hammond					
Jabez Delano Hammond					
Samuel H. Hammond					
Stephen H. Hammond					
William H. Hampton					
Augustus C. Hand					
Joe R. Hanley					
Kemp Hannon	1989–2018		Republican		
Peter Harckham	2019–		Democratic		
John W. Harcourt					
Gideon Hard					
Thomas C. Harden					
Jacob Hardenbergh					
George A. Hardin					
John Haring	1781–1789	Middle		1739–1809	
Abraham V. Harpending					
Hamilton Harris					
Ira Harris					
Maxwell S. Harris					
Henry Harrison (New York state senator)					
Gabriel T. Harrower					
Ephraim Hart					
Truman Hart					
Dennis J. Harte					
Abraham J. Hasbrouck					
Joseph Hasbrouck					
Louis Hasbrouck					
Ralph Hascall					
Conrad Hasenflug					
Ruth Hassell-Thompson	2001–2016		Democratic		
Clifford C. Hastings					
Frederick H. Hastings					
James F. Hastings					
John A. Hastings					
A. Gould Hatch					
Moses P. Hatch					
Ernest I. Hatfield					
Richard Hatfield					
John Hathorn					
John L. Havens	1899–1900	1	Democratic		
Palmer E. Havens					
Edward Hawkins	1890–1891	1	Democratic	1829–1908	
Henry Hawkins					
John A. Hawkins					
Simeon S. Hawkins	1888–1889	1	Republican	1827–1908	
William M. Hawley					
Moses Hayden					
Stephen T. Hayt					
Seth G. Heacock					
John F. Healy (New York)					
William J. Heffernan					
Louis B. Heller					
Nathaniel T. Helman					
Pam Helming	2017–		Republican		
Frank B. Hendel					
Monroe Henderson					
Francis Hendricks					
Joseph P. Hennessy					
Walter R. Herrick	1913–1914			1877–1953	
Daniel Hevesi			Democratic		
Charles J. Hewitt					
William J. Hickey					
Edwin Hicks					
Richard Higbie	1896–1898	1	Republican	1857–1900	
Frank W. Higgins					
James A. Higgins					
Henry W. Hill					
William Henry Hill					
Thomas Hillhouse					
Michelle Hinchey	2021–	46, 41	Democratic	1987–	Chair of the Senate Agriculture Committee
Harvey D. Hinman					
Simon C. Hitchcock					
Zina Hitchcock	1793–1803	Eastern			
Bertrand H. Hoak					
Albert Hobbs					
Michael J. Hoblock Jr.			Republican		
Nancy Larraine Hoffmann	1985–2004		Republican		
Samuel H. Hofstadter					
Edward Hogan					
John C. Hogeboom					
Stephen Hogeboom					
Hendrick S. Holden	1909–1910	28	Republican	1849–1918	
Joseph R. Holland			Republican		
Fred S. Hollowell					
Alexander M. Holmes					
S. Percy Hooker					
Leighton A. Hope					
David Hopkins (New York)					
David Hopkins					
James C. Hopkins					
James G. Hopkins					
Peter W. Hopkins					
Reuben Hopkins					
Samuel M. Hopkins					
Charles B. Horton					
Clinton T. Horton					
S. Wentworth Horton	1947–1956	1	Republican	1885–1960	
William Hotchkiss (state senator)					
John J. Howard					
Brad Hoylman	2013–2024		Democratic		
Jacob W. Hoysradt					
John F. Hubbard Jr.					
John F. Hubbard					
Ruggles Hubbard					
Alrick Hubbell					
Orlando Hubbs	1909–1910	1	Democratic	1840–1930	
Douglas Hudson					
Charles Hughes					
John H. Hughes					
Laurens Hull					
William S. Hults Jr.					
Cornelius Humfrey					
Friend Humphrey					
James M. Humphrey					
Lester H. Humphrey					
Reuben Humphrey					
Wolcott J. Humphrey					
Alvah Hunt					
John Hunter					
Thomas Hunter					
Abel Huntington					
Benjamin N. Huntington					
George Huntington					
Henry Huntington (politician)					
Shirley Huntley			Democratic		
Benjamin Huntting					
James H. Hutchins					
Almanzor Hutchinson					
Christopher Hutton	1801–02	Eastern			
Caleb Hyde					
Fred Isabella					
Eugene S. Ives					
Robert Jackson			Democratic		
Chris Jacobs			Republican		
John C. Jacobs					
Louis J. Jacobson					
Rodney B. Janes					
James Jay	1778–1782	Southern		1732–1815	
Anna V. Jefferson					
Andrew Jenkins					
Harold A. Jerry Jr.					
Craig M. Johnson			Democratic		
Daniel Johnson					
Frank E. Johnson (Brooklyn)					
George Y. Johnson					
Noadiah Johnson					
Owen H. Johnson	1973–2008	4	Republican		
Robert E. Johnson					
Stephen C. Johnson					
Stephen H. Johnson					
William Johnson					
William Samuel Johnson (state senator)					
William Elting Johnson					
Robert Johnston (New York)					
Addison P. Jones					
Elbert H. Jones					
John Patterson Jones					
John Jones	1777–1778	Southern		1729–1791	
Mary Ellen Jones					
Nathaniel Jones					
Samuel Jones					
Samuel A. Jones					
Ambrose L. Jordan					
Daphne Jordan			Republican		
Irving J. Joseph					
Lazarus Joseph					
David C. Judson					
Frederick Juliand					
Todd Kaminsky			Democratic		
Abraham Kaplan (New York City)					
Anna Kaplan	2018–2022	7	Democratic	1965–	First Iranian-American to be elected to either of NY State's legislative chambers; first former political refugee to serve in the NY State Senate.
John L. Karle					
Burt Z. Kasson					
Abraham L. Katlin					
Brian P. Kavanagh			Democratic		
Frederick W. Kavanaugh					
Jeremiah Keck					
Luke A. Keenan					
James J. Kehoe					
L. Paul Kehoe					
Charles Kellogg					
Isaac Kellogg					
Rowland C. Kellogg					
Bernard Kelly					
George Bradshaw Kelly					
Joseph D. Kelly					
William Kelly					
John C. Kemble					
John R. Kennaday					
Alfred J. Kennedy					
George N. Kennedy					
Martin J. Kennedy					
Timothy M. Kennedy			Democratic		
Moss Kent					
Michael J. Kernan					
John Kerrigan					
John H. Ketcham					
Perley Keyes					
John J. Kiernan					
Frederick D. Kilburn					
John A. King					
Micajah W. Kirby					
Leigh G. Kirkland					
William Kirnan					
John Kissel					
Jeffrey D. Klein					
Philip M. Kleinfeld					
Adam W. Kline					
Jacob G. Klock	1778–1785	Western			
Charles L. Knapp					
H. Wallace Knapp					
John Knight					
Martin J. Knorr					
John Knox (Seneca County, NY)					
Joseph Koch					
Theodore Koehler					
Jacob Koenig					
Milton Koerner					
Jeffrey R. Korman					
Harry Kraf					
Liz Krueger			Democratic		
Carl Kruger			Democratic		
Hobart Krum					
Mary Anne Krupsak			Democratic		
Randy Kuhl	1987–2004	52	Republican	1943–	
Irving L'Hommedieu					
Nicholas B. La Bau					
William J. La Roche					
Isaac Lacey					
Robert C. Lacey					
Seymour P. Lachman			Democratic		
James J. Lack					
John J. LaFalce					
Addison H. Laflin					
William Laimbeer Jr.					
Wells Lake					
George D. Lamont					
William C. Lamont					
Charles Lamy					
Jonathan Landon	1777–1779	Middle			
Jonathan Landon					
George F. Langbein					
Walter B. Langley					
Albert P. Laning					
Abraham Lansing					
Frederick Lansing					
Robert Lansing					
Andrew Lanza			Republican		
Carlo A. Lanzillotti					
Nathan Lapham					
Edward P. Larkin					
William J. Larkin Jr.			Republican		
George Latimer			Democratic		
John Laughlin					
John Laurance					
Kenneth LaValle	1977–2020	1	Republican	1939–	
Thomas Laverne					
Walter W. Law Jr.					
Edward A. Lawrence					
John L. Lawrence					
Jonathan Lawrence	1777–1783	Southern		1737–1812	
Sidney Lawrence					
Robert R. Lawson					
Abraham L. Lawyer					
Thomas A. Ledwith					
M. Lindley Lee					
Martin Lee					
William H. Lee					
John Lefferts					
Peter Lefferts					
Vincent Leibell	1995–2009	37, 40	Republican	1946–	
Franz S. Leichter					
Abraham Lent					
Norman F. Lent					
Edward S. Lentol					
Albert Lester					
Royden A. Letsen					
Eugene Levy					
Meyer Levy					
Norman J. Levy					
Albert B. Lewis					
Loran L. Lewis					
Morgan Lewis					
William Lewis					
Clarence Lexow					
Thomas W. Libous			Republican		
Simon J. Liebowitz					
John J. Linson					
Leonard R. Lipowicz					
John W. Lippitt					
Betty Little			Republican		
David H. Little					
Russell M. Little					
John Liu			Democratic		
Charles L. Livingston					
Edward Philip Livingston					
Henry A. Livingston					
Jacob H. Livingston					
Peter R. Livingston					
Philip Livingston					
Philip Livingston	1777–1778	Southern		1716–1778	
Nathaniel Locke					
Charles C. Lockwood					
Tarky Lombardi Jr.	1966–1992	50	Republican		
James L. Long	1911–1912	1	Democratic		
Chauncey Loomis					
Chester Loomis					
David P. Loomis					
Frank M. Loomis					
James H. Loomis					
Bert Lord					
George P. Lord					
Jarvis Lord					
John A. Lott					
Ebenezer Lounsbery					
John Lounsbery (New York)					
William L. Love					
Ralph A. Loveland					
Henry R. Low					
Samuel S. Lowery					
Seymour Lowman					
Stephen Lush	1800–02	Eastern			
Clayton R. Lusk					
Sidney A. von Luther					
John A. Lynch (Staten Island)					
Robert E. Lynch (New York)					
Charles W. Lynde					
Dolphus S. Lynde					
Tilly Lynde					
Caleb Lyon					
Charles L. MacArthur					
Allan Macdonald					
John G. Macdonald					
Ebenezer Mack					
Thomas J. Mackell					
James P. Mackenzie					
William F. Mackey					
James Mackin					
John J. Mackrell					
W. Kingsland Macy	1945–1946	1	Republican	1889–1961	
Edward M. Madden					
Francis J. Mahoney					
Walter J. Mahoney	1937–1964	48, 53, 55	Republican	1908–1982	
Leonard Maison					
George R. Malby					
William Mallery					
James Mallory (Rensselaer County, NY)					
John F. Malone					
Serphin R. Maltese	2003–2008	15	Republican	1933–	
Samuel Mandelbaum					
William G. Mandeville					
Guy James Mangano					
Benjamin F. Manierre					
Charles A. Mann					
George T. Manning					
John Mannion	2020–2024	50	Democratic	1968–	
Carmine J. Marasco					
Carl L. Marcellino			Republican		
John J. Marchi	1957–2006	19, 26, 23, 24	Republican	1921–2009	
Kathy Marchione			Republican		
Joseph E. Marine					
Marty Markowitz	1979–2001	19, 21	Democratic	1945–	
Jacob Marks					
Joseph R. Marro					
Henry Marshall					
N. Monroe Marshall					
Bernard F. Martin					
Frederick S. Martin					
Walter Martin (New York)					
William C. Martin (New York)					
William E. Martin (New York)	1921–1922	49	Republican	1886–1923	
Monica Martinez			Democratic		
Jack Martins			Republican		
Matthew W. Marvin					
Nathaniel C. Marvin					
Anthony Masiello					
Edwyn E. Mason					
Seabury C. Mastick					
Hiram F. Mather					
John C. Mather					
Vincent Mathews					
Mario Mattera	2021-				
Abner C. Mattoon					
Rachel May			Democratic		
Shelley Mayer			Democratic		
John Maynard					
William H. Maynard					
George D. Maziarz			Republican		
James H. McCabe					
Francis J. McCaffrey Jr.					
Francis J. McCaffrey					
Carl McCall			Democratic		
James McCall					
John T. McCall					
Patrick H. McCarren					
Dennis McCarthy					
John McCarty (born 1844)					
John McCarty (born 1782)					
Richard McCleery					
Charles P. McClelland					
James D. McClelland					
Martin G. McCue					
Frank S. McCullough					
Roy J. McDonald			Republican		
Alexander McDougall					
John G. McDowell					
Francis L. McElroy					
John A. McElwain					
James B. McEwan					
Robert C. McEwen					
James T. McFarland					
Walter G. McGahan					
Peter J. McGarry					
Patricia McGee					
J. Raymond McGovern					
Archibald C. McGowan					
Thomas F. McGowan					
Perrin H. McGraw					
John M. McHugh			Republican		
Archibald McIntyre					
John T. McKennan					
William M. McKinney	1901–1902	1	Republican		
John W. McKnight					
John McLean (New York politician)					
John McLean Jr.					
Martin T. McMahon					
Thomas J. McManus					
Duncan McMartin Jr.					
Richard McMichael					
Daniel H. McMillan (American politician)					
William McMurray					
John J. McNaboe					
Donald McNaughton					
George L. Meade					
Christopher J. Mega					
Raymond A. Meier			Republican		
Hunter Meighan					
Olga A. Méndez					
George R. Metcalf					
Jen Metzger			Democratic		
John Meyer (New York)					
Schuyler M. Meyer					
A. Frederick Meyerson					
Paul Micheau					
Andrew C. Middleton					
Elijah Miles (New York)					
Benjamin Miller (New York)					
Edwin E. Miller					
John J. Miller (politician)					
Julius Miller					
Samuel H. Miller (New York)					
Samuel Miller (New York state senator)					
Albert M. Mills					
C. Corey Mills					
Isaac N. Mills					
Ogden L. Mills					
Wheeler Milmoe					
Theodore L. Minier					
Isaac B. Mitchell					
MacNeil Mitchell					
Richard H. Mitchell					
Thomas B. Mitchell					
Hiram Monserrate			Democratic		
Joseph G. Montalto					
Charles C. Montgomery					
Velmanette Montgomery			Democratic		
Darius A. Moore					
Hugh H. Moore					
John J. Moore					
Thomas P. Morahan			Republican		
John T. More					
Edwin D. Morgan					
George Morgan					
Jedediah Morgan					
Lewis H. Morgan					
Jeremiah J. Moriarty					
Fred G. Moritt					
Harvey R. Morris					
Jacob Morris					
Lewis Morris	1777–1781, 1783–1790	Southern		1726–1798	
Lorenzo Morris					
Richard Morris	1778–1779	Southern		1730–1810	
John P. Morrissey					
John Morrissey					
Harry K. Morton					
William A. Moseley					
Constance Baker Motley					
John B. Mullan					
Dominick F. Mullaney					
Joseph Mullin					
George G. Munger					
Allen Munroe					
James Munroe					
Louis Munzinger					
Charles Frederick Murphy					
George A. Murphy					
Henry C. Murphy					
John McLeod Murphy					
Michael C. Murphy					
Peter P. Murphy					
Terrence Murphy			Republican		
William J. Murray					
John F. Murtaugh					
William H. Murtha					
Charles Muzzicato					
Michael Myers					
Rinier Mynderse	1777–1781	Western			
Zellnor Myrie			Democratic		
Anthony Nanula					
Henry Neddo					
Henry C. Nelson					
Homer Augustus Nelson					
Thomas Newbold					
Josiah T. Newcomb					
Obadiah Newcomb					
Lloyd A. Newcombe					
Charles D. Newton					
John Nicholas					
Robert C. Nicholas					
Asher P. Nichols					
George S. Nichols					
John A. Nichols					
John I. Nicks					
Courtlandt Nicoll					
Francis Nicoll					
Dalwin J. Niles					
Archibald C. Niven					
Howard C. Nolan Jr.					
Arden L. Norton					
Christopher F. Norton					
James Norton (New York state senator)					
Michael Norton					
Gordon I. Novod					
James Noxon					
John Noyes (died 1830)					
John Noyes (died 1852)					
Michael F. Nozzolio			Republican		
Joseph D. Nunan Jr.					
Myer Nussbaum					
Duncan T. O'Brien					
Henry L. O'Brien					
James O'Brien					
James H. O'Brien					
Norman A. O'Brien					
Ted O'Brien			Democratic		
Edmund O'Connor					
Eugene F. O'Connor					
Frank D. O'Connor					
Frank A. O'Donnel					
John O'Donnell					
Thomas H. O'Keefe	1913–1914	1	Democratic		
Tom O'Mara			Republican		
William T. O'Neil					
Thomas C. O'Sullivan					
James M. Oakley					
Isaac Ogden					
Manfred Ohrenstein					
Allen J. Oliver					
William M. Oliver					
Andrew Onderdonk					
George Onorato			Democratic		
Henry Oothoudt	1781–1785	Western		1739–1801	
Suzi Oppenheimer	1985–2009	36, 37	Democratic	1934–	
William L. Ormrod					
Rob Ortt			Republican		
Edward B. Osborne					
James Otis					
John H. Otis					
Albert Ottinger					
Robert Owen Jr.					
George A. Owens					
James Owens (New York City)					
Major Owens					
Carl Pack					
Frank Padavan			Republican		
Alfred R. Page					
Charles B. Page					
Roy M. Page					
Alonzo C. Paige					
Ephraim Paine	1779–1781; 1782–1785	Middle		1730–1785	
George Eustis Paine					
Lyman Paine (politician)					
Irwin Pakula					
Abiah W. Palmer					
Abraham J. Palmer					
Harry J. Palmer					
Thomas Palmer	1781–1783	Middle			
Anthony Palumbo	2021-		Republican		
Marc Panepinto			Democratic		
Harold I. Panken					
Daniel Paris (politician)					
Isaac Paris	1777–1778	Western			
Joseph E. Parisi					
Abraham X. Parker					
Amasa J. Parker Jr.					
Kevin Parker			Democratic		
Arthur Parks	1777–1788	Middle			
Roswell A. Parmenter					
Cornelius R. Parsons					
Thomas Parsons					
George Pataki			Republican		
Basil A. Paterson			Democratic		
David Paterson			Democratic		
John E. Paterson					
Lloyd H. Paterson					
Henry I. Patrie					
Bernard M. Patten					
Frank D. Pavey					
Levi Pawling	1777–1782	Middle		−1782	
Lewis S. Payne					
Bethuel Peck					
Jedediah Peck					
William D. Peckham					
Jose Peralta			Democratic		
Joseph F. Periconi	1953–1954, 1957–1960	27, 29	Republican	1910–1994	
Bill Perkins			Democratic		
Charles D. Perry					
John C. Perry					
John D. Perry					
Roxanne Persaud			Democratic		
Henry H. Persons					
Dutton Peterson					
Joseph H. Petty					
Phelps Phelps					
Seth Phelps (New York)					
Elaine Phillips			Republican		
George H. Pierce					
George T. Pierce					
James F. Pierce					
Henry R. Pierson					
Frank J. Pino					
Joseph R. Pisani					
Fred B. Pitcher					
Perley A. Pitcher					
Edmund L. Pitts					
Frank C. Platt					
James Platt (New York)					
Jonas Platt					
Moss K. Platt					
Nehemiah Platt					
Zephaniah Platt	1777–1783	Middle		1735–1807	
George W. Plunkitt					
Henry W. Pollock					
Robert Watson Pomeroy					
Theodore M. Pomeroy					
John Porter					
Timothy H. Porter					
Cuthbert W. Pound					
James E. Powers					
James Powers					
William Powers					
Elisha N. Pratt					
George W. Pratt					
Jediah Prendergast					
John J. Prendergast					
Jess J. Present					
Spencer G. Prime					
L. Bradford Prince					
Nathan Proller					
Erastus S. Prosser					
John V. L. Pruyn					
Ebenezer Purdy					
Harvey Putnam					
James O. Putnam					
David Pye (assemblyman)					
Herman I. Quackenboss					
Ralph E. Quattrociocchi					
Elmer F. Quinn					
John E. Quinn					
John M. Quinn (New York City)					
Ellwood M. Rabenold					
Peter W. Radcliff					
Edmund P. Radwan					
John Chandler Rafferty					
George Raines					
John Raines					
Jessica Ramos			Democratic		
Joseph H. Ramsey					
Samuel J. Ramsperger					
Michael Ranzenhofer			Republican		
Fred J. Rath					
Mary Lou Rath			Republican		
Benjamin Ray					
Alexander Rea					
Heman J. Redfield					
Michael E. Reiburn					
Edward F. Reilly					
George M. Reischmann					
Samuel Rexford					
William H. Reynolds (Brooklyn)					
Elijah Rhoades					
Jacob Rice					
Luther Rich					
George Richards					
Ralph Richards					
Eaton J. Richardson					
John Richardson (New York)					
William P. Richardson					
Volney Richmond					
James Rider					
Lloyd Stephen Riford Jr.					
James W. Riley					
Daniel J. Riordan					
Patty Ritchie			Republican		
Gustavo Rivera			Democratic		
Joe Robach			Republican		
J. Hampden Robb					
Robert H. Roberts					
George W. Robertson					
Hezekiah D. Robertson					
William H. Robertson					
Charles D. Robinson (New York)					
Theodore Douglas Robinson					
Thomas Robinson (New York State Senator)					
William W. Rockwell					
Eugene Rodriguez					
George F. Roesch					
Eli W. Rogers					
George F. Rogers					
Sherman S. Rogers					
Jay P. Rolison Jr.	1967–1990	38, 39, 41	Republican	1929–2007	Assistant Majority Leader between 1985 and 1990
Robert Rolison	2023–	39	Republican		
Franklin D. Roosevelt	1911–1913	26	Democratic	1882–1945	
Isaac Roosevelt	1777–1786, 1788–1792	Southern	Federalist	1726–1794	
Erastus Root	1840–1843	3	Whig	1773–1846	
David Rosado					
John B. Rose					
Robert Roseboom					
George Rosecrantz					
William Rosenblatt	1945–1970	16		1906–1999	Chair of the Committee on the Judiciary (1965)
Ogden J. Ross					
William Ross					
Francis M. Rotch					
Casper M. Rouse					
Roy H. Rudd					
William Ruger					
Francis H. Ruggles					
Israel Ruiz Jr.					
Lawrence M. Rulison					
Charles E. Russell					
Charles H. Russell					
Ebenezer Russell	1778–1779, 1780–1781, 1784–1788, 1795–1803	Eastern		1747–1836	
Henry Russell (New York state senator)					
John W. Russell (politician)					
Michael Russell					
Peter H. Ruvolo					
Allan A. Ryan Jr.					
John P. Ryan (New York politician)					
John Sabini			Democratic		
Henry M. Sage					
Stephen M. Saland			Republican		
Henry Salant					
Julia Salazar			Democratic		
John L. Sampson			Democratic		
Archie D. Sanders					
James Sanders Jr.			Democratic		
John Sanders (New York)	1798–1802	Eastern			
Joshua Sands					
Robert Sands (New York)					
Edward Sanford					
George H. Sanford					
Mitchell Sanford					
Nathan Sanford					
Reuben Sanford					
Richard K. Sanford					
Felix J. Sanner					
Alfred E. Santangelo					
Nellie R. Santiago					
John J. Santucci					
Edward Savage	1788–92, 1801–07	Eastern			
James Savage (New York)					
Diane Savino					
John G. Saxe	1911–1912	17	Democratic	1877–1953	
Martin Saxe					
Theodore S. Sayre					
Charles V. Scanlan					
Henry G. Schackno					
Richard Schell					
Abraham Schenck					
John I. Schenck					
John Schenck					
Richard E. Schermerhorn					
John F. Schlosser					
Eric Schneiderman			Democratic		
Augustus Schoonmaker Jr.					
Cornelius C. Schoonmaker					
Marius Schoonmaker					
Frederick A. Schroeder					
George M. S. Schulz					
Jerome Schutzer					
Peter Schuyler					
Philip Schuyler	1780–1784; 1786–1790; 1792–1797	Western		1733–1804	
Murray Schwartz					
Jacob J. Schwartzwald					
William F. Scoresby					
Allen D. Scott					
George G. Scott					
John B. Scott					
John Morin Scott	1777–1782	Southern		1730–1784	
Carlos P. Scovil					
Larry Seabrook					
William R. Sears					
Henry J. Sedgwick					
Jacob Seebacher					
John Seeley					
Gilbert T. Seelye					
Francis Seger					
Simon Seibert					
Edmund Seidel					
Charles Selden					
John H. Selkreg					
Luis R. Sepúlveda			Democratic		
Sue Serino			Republican		
José M. Serrano	2005–	28	Democratic		
Loren B. Sessions					
Walter L. Sessions					
James Seward			Republican		
William H. Seward					
Henry Seymour					
Whitney North Seymour Jr.					
Ira Shafer					
James H. Shaw Jr.					
Titus Sheard					
John B. Sheffer II					
John S. Sheppard					
Kenneth Sherbell					
John V. Sheridan					
Thomas I. Sheridan					
Alpheus Sherman					
George C. Sherman					
Franklin D. Sherwood					
Lyman Sherwood					
Daniel Shipherd					
Searles G. Shultz					
Mark H. Sibley					
Daniel Sickles					
Peter Silvester					
George W. Simpson					
William T. Simpson					
Alanson Skinner					
Avery Skinner					
Roger Skinner					
James Skoufis			Democratic		
Fred J. Slater					
George A. Slater					
Samuel S. Slater					
George B. Sloan					
Sylvanus Smalley					
Baxter T. Smelzer					
Ada L. Smith			Democratic		
Addison M. Smith					
Bernard C. Smith					
C. Ernest Smith					
Henry B. Smith					
Jesse C. Smith					
John E. Smith					
Joshua Smith					
Joshua B. Smith					
Justin A. Smith					
Malcolm Smith			Democratic		
Nathan Smith (Herkimer County, NY)					
Sanford W. Smith					
Saxton Smith					
William T. Smith					
William Smith	1777–1783	Southern		1720–1799	
Jacob Snell					
Simeon Snow					
John Snyder (Columbia County, NY)					
William Sohmer					
Martin M. Solomon					
Herbert I. Sorin					
Nicholas A. Spano			Republican		
Ambrose Spencer					
John Canfield Spencer					
Joseph Spencer					
Joshua A. Spencer					
Mark Spencer					
Edward J. Speno					
Francis B. Spinola					
E. Carleton Sprague					
David Spraker					
George E. Spring					
Daniel Squadron			Democratic		
Daniel B. St. John					
William Stachowski			Democratic		
Charles A. Stadler					
Ronald B. Stafford	1966–2002	42	Republican	1935–2005	
C. Tracey Stagg					
Charles Stanford					
Henry Brewster Stanton					
Charles W. Stapleton					
James F. Starbuck					
Leonard P. Stavisky			Democratic		
Toby Ann Stavisky	1999–	16	Democratic	1939–	
John Stearns	1909–1913	Eastern	Federalist	1770–1848	
Charles Stebbins					
William M. Steinfeldt					
Micah Sterling					
Frederick C. Stevens					
James Stevens					
Andrea Stewart-Cousins			Democratic		
Edwin C. Stewart					
Lispenard Stewart					
Samuel Stewart (New York)					
Waldaba Stewart					
Stephen J. Stilwell					
John D. Stivers					
Walter W. Stokes					
Asahel C. Stone					
Adam Storing					
David Storobin			Republican		
Isaac Stoutenburgh	1778–1787	Southern		1739–1799	
Horatio J. Stow					
John G. Stower					
Robert H. Strahan					
Farrand Stranahan					
Nevada N. Stranahan					
Chester J. Straub					
Nathan Straus Jr.					
Demas Strong					
Henry W. Strong					
Selah Strong					
John Sudam					
John Suffern					
Christopher D. Sullivan					
Timothy Sullivan					
Edmund G. Sutherland					
Jacob Sutherland					
Kenneth F. Sutherland					
Solomon Sutherland					
Peter Swart					
Jacobus Swartwout					
Arthur L. Swartz					
James G. Sweeney					
Sidney Sweet					
William L. Sweet					
Parton Swift					
Azor Taber					
William Taber					
Enoch B. Talcott					
Frederick A. Tallmadge					
Matthias B. Tallmadge					
Nathaniel P. Tallmadge					
John W. Tamblin					
Christopher Tappen					
Joseph A. Tauriello					
John Tayler	1801–02, 1803–13	Eastern		1742–1829	
George H. Taylor (New York state senator)					
John C. R. Taylor					
John W. Taylor					
Jim Tedisco			Republican		
Abraham Ten Broeck	1779–1783	Western		1734–1810	
Dirck W. Ten Broeck	1777–1779	Western		1738–1780	
Anthony Ten Eyck	1796–1801	Eastern			
John Boyd Thacher					
Seymour R. Thaler					
Francis S. Thayer					
Warren T. Thayer					
Edward B. Thomas					
Kevin Thomas			Democratic		
Ralph W. Thomas					
Thomas Thomas (New York)					
Antoine Thompson			Democratic		
George F. Thompson					
George L. Thompson	1915–1941	1	Republican	1864–1941	
James A. Thompson					
James G. Thompson					
William C. Thompson					
William Thompson (Orange County, NY)					
Stephen Thorn	1804–08, 1823–25	Eastern, 2nd			
William L. Thornton					
George B. Throop					
George Tibbits					
LeGrand C. Tibbits					
Daniel F. Tiemann					
George Tiffany (New York)					
Thomas Tillotson					
Robert C. Titus					
Cecilia Tkaczyk			Democratic		
Franklin W. Tobey					
William H. Tobey					
Walker Todd					
Ward V. Tolbert					
Bernard Tompkins					
Minthorne Tompkins					
Herman H. Torborg					
Gardner Towne					
James E. Towner					
Henry A. Townsend					
John Townsend					
John Townsend (Westchester County, NY)					
Samuel Townsend					
William Townsend					
Elishama Tozer	1779–1780	Eastern		1741–1833	
Albert H. Tracy					
Patrick F. Trainor					
William C. Traphagen					
F. Warren Travers					
Eugene M. Travis					
Valentine Treadwell					
Frank P. Treanor					
Thomas Tredwell	1785–1789, 1803–1807	Southern, Eastern		1743–1831	
James S. Truman					
Lyman Truman					
Caesar Trunzo	1973–2008	3	Republican		
Michael J. Tully Jr.					
William J. Tully					
Henry E. Turner					
Ray B. Tuttle					
Sidney Tuttle					
William M. Tweed					
Jeremiah F. Twomey					
Jacob Tyson					
Alonzo S. Upham					
Bloomfield Usher					
Moses Vail	1796–1801	Eastern			
David Valesky			Democratic		
Peter A. Van Bergen					
Martin Van Buren					
Philip Van Cortlandt					
Pierre Van Cortlandt	1777–1778	Southern		1721–1814	
Cornelius Van Cott					
Henry H. Van Dyck					
Arlington P. Van Dyke					
Greenleaf S. Van Gorder					
Frank E. Van Lare					
David Van Ness					
Peter Van Ness					
John B. Van Petten					
Stephen Van Rensselaer					
Anthony Van Schaick	1777–1780	Western			
John Van Schaick					
Myndert Van Schaick					
Jacobus Van Schoonhoven	1793–1805	Western, Eastern		c.1744–1814	
William H. Van Schoonhoven					
Jacobus Van Schoonhoven					
Abraham Van Vechten	1797–1805, 1815–19	Eastern, Middle			
Walter Van Wiggeren					
John Vanderbilt					
John Vanderbilt					
Isaac L. Varian					
Edmund Varney					
Commodore P. Vedder					
John Veeder	1805–09	Eastern			
Simon Veeder	1803–05	Eastern			
Guy J. Velella			Republican		
Henry P. Velte					
Samuel G. Verbryck					
Gulian C. Verplanck					
John L. Viele					
Dale M. Volker			Republican		
Arthur Wachtel					
James Wadsworth					
David Wager					
Joseph Wagner					
Robert F. Wagner					
Webster Wagner					
Alfred Wagstaff Jr.					
J. Mayhew Wainwright					
Albert Wald					
Alton Waldon	1991–2000	15	Democratic	1936–2023	
B. Roger Wales					
Charles E. Walker					
Edward C. Walker					
Alvah H. Walker					
Jimmy Walker					
G. Frank Wallace					
William C. Wallace (state senator)					
Thomas J. Walsh					
J. Henry Walters					
Charles W. Walton					
Elisha Ward					
Jasper Ward (New York)					
Jonathan Ward					
Peter Ward					
Stephen Ward	1780–1787	Southern			
Frederick L. Warder					
Andrew S. Warner					
Earle S. Warner					
Ivan Warner					
Spencer K. Warnick					
Moses Warren					
Thomas G. Waterman					
John D. Watkins (New York)					
James Watson					
James Lopez Watson					
J. Griswold Webb					
Bill Weber	2023–	38	Republican		
Alexander Webster	1777–1778, 1779–1785, 1789–1793	Eastern		1734–1810	
Jeremy S. Weinstein					
Augustus Weismann					
George B. Wellington					
Abijah J. Wellman					
Edward Wemple					
William W. Wemple					
Gottfried H. Wende					
Gerrit Wendell					
Willis Wendell					
Stephen H. Wendover					
Walter W. Westall					
David M. Westcott					
Henry C. Wetmore					
James S. Whallon					
Leon F. Wheatley					
Clayton L. Wheeler					
Grattan H. Wheeler					
Melancton Wheeler					
Osmer B. Wheeler					
Thomas J. Wheeler					
William A. Wheeler					
Andrew Dickson White					
Charles J. White					
Ebenezer White					
Horace White					
Joseph White (New York)					
Loren H. White					
Roderick White					
William B. Whiting	1781–1785	Western			
James L. Whitley					
Thomas C. Whitlock					
George H. Whitney					
Arthur H. Wicks					
Charles W. Wicks					
Julius L. Wieman					
Edward G. Wilbor					
Benjamin M. Wilcox					
William S. C. Wiley					
James W. Wilkin					
Garry A. Willard					
John Willard					
John D. Willard					
Joseph A. Willard					
Kenneth R. Willard					
Jabez Willes					
Alexander B. Williams					
Benjamin H. Williams					
Henry D. Williams					
John Williams	1777–1778, 1782–1795	Eastern		1752–1806	
John F. Williams					
Josiah B. Williams					
Lawrence G. Williams (New York)					
Richard H. Williams					
Richard S. Williams					
Robert Williams (New York)					
Stephen K. Williams					
Timothy S. Williams					
Pliny W. Williamson					
Charles T. Willis					
Isaac Wilson					
Jerome L. Wilson					
Thomas B. Wilson					
Linda Winikow	1974–	35th	Democratic		
George H. Winner Jr.			Republican		
Bradley Winslow					
Norris Winslow					
Henry A. Wise					
Henry Wisner	1777–1782	Middle		1720–1790	
Frank L. Wiswall					
George H. Witter					
Stephen J. Wojtkowiak					
John J. Wolcott					
Henry Wolfert					
Joseph C. Wolff					
Benjamin Wood					
Daniel P. Wood					
James Wood					
Walter A. Wood Jr.					
Jesse Woodhull	1777–1781	Middle		1735–1795	
William B. Woodin					
Christian B. Woodruff					
Benjamin Woodward					
John Woodworth	1803–1807	Eastern		1768–1858	
Sherman Wooster					
Samuel Works					
Jacob Worth					
Albert A. Wray					
Dan S. Wright					
James W. Wright			Republican		
John C. Wright					
Silas Wright					
Abraham Yates Jr.	1777–1790	Western		1724–1796	
Henry Yates Jr.					
James W. Yelverton					
George Yost					
Catharine Young			Republican		
Fred A. Young	1939–1949	35, 40	Republican	1904–1973	
Horace C. Young					
Samuel Young	1818–1821	Eastern	Democratic-Republican, Bucktails	1779–1850	
Joseph Zaretzki	1948–1974		Democratic	1900–1981	Democratic Minority Leader from 1957 to 1964, and from 1966 to 1974
Lee Zeldin	2011–2014	3	Republican	1980–	

== See also ==
- New York State Senate
- Majority Leader of the New York State Senate
- New York State Assembly
- List of New York State Legislature members expelled or censured
