= 165th New York State Legislature =

New York state legislative session

←	164th	166th	→
- New York State Capitol (2009)

Overview
- Legislative body: New York State Legislature
- Jurisdiction: New York, United States
- Term: January 1, 1945 – December 31, 1946

Senate
- Members: 56
- President: Lt. Gov. Joe R. Hanley (R)
- Temporary President: Benjamin F. Feinberg (R)
- Party control: Republican; 1945: (35–21); 1946: (36–19)

Assembly
- Members: 150
- Speaker: Oswald D. Heck (R)
- Party control: Republican; 1945: (94–55–1); 1946: (94–54–1)

Sessions
- 1st: January 3 – March 24, 1945
- 2nd: January 2 – March 26, 1946

The 165th New York State Legislature, consisting of the New York State Senate and the New York State Assembly, met from January 3, 1945, to March 26, 1946, during the third and fourth years of Thomas E. Dewey's governorship, in Albany.

== Background ==
In 1943, the Legislature re-apportioned the Senate and Assembly districts. The total number of state senators was increased to 56. Chautauqua, Dutchess, Monroe, Oneida, Rensselaer, St. Lawrence, Schenectady and Steuben counties lost one Assembly seat each; and New York County lost seven seats. Kings and Westchester counties gained one seat each; Nassau County gained two; Bronx County gained five; and Queens County gained six seats.

Thus, under the provisions of the New York Constitution of 1938, re-apportioned in 1943, 56 Senators and 150 assemblymen were elected in single-seat districts for two-year terms. The senatorial districts consisted either of one or more entire counties; or a contiguous area within a single county. The counties which were divided into more than one senatorial district were Kings (nine districts), New York (six), Bronx (five), Queens (four), Erie (three), Westchester (three), Monroe (two) and Nassau (two). The Assembly districts consisted either of a single entire county (except Hamilton Co.), or of contiguous area within one county.

At this time there were two major political parties: the Republican Party and the Democratic Party. The American Labor Party, the newly organized Liberal Party and the Socialist Labor Party (running under the name of "Industrial Government Party") also nominated tickets.

== Elections ==
The 1944 New York state election, was held on November 7. The two statewide elective offices up for election were carried by Democrats with American Labor and Liberal endorsement. The approximate party strength at this election, as expressed by the average vote for U.S. Senator and Judge of the Court of Appeals, was: Republicans 2,913,000; Democrats 2,432,000; American Labor 476,000; Liberals 320,000; and Industrial Government 16,000.

Two of the four women members of the previous legislature—State Senator Rhoda Fox Graves (Rep.), of Gouverneur; and Assemblywoman Mary A. Gillen (Dem.), of Brooklyn—were re-elected. Gladys E. Banks (Rep.), of the Bronx; and Genesta M. Strong (Rep.), of Plandome Heights, were also elected to the Assembly.

The 1945 New York state election was held on November 6. No statewide elective offices were up for election. Three vacancies in the State Senate and five vacancies in the Assembly were filled.

== Sessions ==
The Legislature met for the first regular session (the 168th) at the State Capitol in Albany on January 3, 1945; and adjourned on March 24.

Oswald D. Heck (Rep.) was re-elected Speaker.

Benjamin F. Feinberg (Rep.) was re-elected Temporary President of the State Senate.

The Legislature met for the second regular session (the 169th) at the State Capitol in Albany on January 2, 1946; and adjourned on March 26.

== State Senate ==
=== Districts ===
- 1st District: Suffolk County
- 2nd and 3rd District: Parts of Nassau County
- 4th, 5th, 6th and 7th District: Parts of Queens County, i.e. the Borough of Queens
- 8th, 9th, 10th, 11th, 12th, 13th, 14th, 15th and 16th District: Parts of Kings County, i.e. the Borough of Brooklyn
- 17th District: Richmond County, i.e. the Borough of Richmond (now the Borough of Staten Island)
- 18th, 19th, 20th, 21st, 22nd and 23rd District: Parts of New York County, i.e. the Borough of Manhattan
- 24th, 25th, 26th, 27th and 28th District: Parts of Bronx County, i.e. the Borough of the Bronx
- 29th, 30th and 31st District: Parts of Westchester County
- 32nd District: Orange and Rockland counties
- 33rd District: Columbia, Dutchess and Putnam counties
- 34th District: Delaware, Greene, Sullivan and Ulster counties
- 35th District: Albany County
- 36th District: Rensselaer and Saratoga counties
- 37th District: Montgomery and Schenectady counties
- 38th District: Clinton, Essex, Warren and Washington counties
- 39th District: St. Lawrence and Franklin counties
- 40th District: Fulton, Hamilton, Herkimer and Lewis counties
- 41st District: Oneida County
- 42nd District: Jefferson and Oswego counties
- 43rd District: Onondaga County
- 44th District: Chenango, Cortland, Madison, Otsego and Schoharie counties
- 45th District: Broome County
- 46th District: Chemung, Schuyler, Tioga and Tompkins counties
- 47th District: Cayuga, Seneca and Wayne counties
- 48th District: Ontario, Steuben and Yates counties
- 49th District: Allegany, Genesee, Livingston and Wyoming counties
- 50th and 51st District: Parts of Monroe County
- 52nd District: Niagara and Orleans counties
- 53rd, 54th and 55th District: Parts of Erie County
- 56th District: Cattaraugus and Chautauqua counties

=== Members ===
The asterisk (*) denotes members of the previous Legislature who continued in office as members of this Legislature. John D. Bennett, William S. Hults Jr, Roy H. Rudd, Fred G. Moritt, Louis L. Friedman, Isidore Dollinger and Mortimer A. Cullen changed from the Assembly to the Senate at the beginning of this Legislature. Assemblymen Arthur Wachtel and Fred S. Hollowell were elected to fill vacancies in the Senate.

Note: For brevity, the chairmanships omit the words "...the Committee on (the)..."

District	Senator	Party	Notes
1st	Perry B. Duryea Sr.*	Republican	on April 11, 1945, appointed as Commissioner of Conservation.
1st	W. Kingsland Macy	Republican	on November 6, 1945, elected to fill vacancy; on November 5, 1946, elected to the 80th U.S. Congress
2nd	John D. Bennett*	Republican	
3rd	William S. Hults Jr.*	Republican	
4th	Seymour Halpern*	Republican	
5th	Frederic E. Hammer	Republican	
6th	John V. Downey*	Dem./Am. Labor	
7th	William N. Conrad	Democrat	
8th	James J. Crawford*	Dem./Lib.	
9th	Roy H. Rudd*	Democrat	
10th	James A. Corcoran*	Democrat	
11th	Fred G. Moritt*	Dem./Am. Labor	
12th	Samuel L. Greenberg*	Dem./Am. Labor	
13th	William Kirnan*	Democrat	
14th	Joseph E. Parisi	Republican	
15th	Louis L. Friedman*	Democrat	
16th	William Rosenblatt	Democrat	
17th	Robert S. Bainbridge*	Republican	
18th	Elmer F. Quinn*	Democrat	Minority Leader
19th	Francis J. Mahoney*	Democrat	
20th	Frederic R. Coudert Jr.*	Republican	on November 5, 1946, elected to the 80th U.S. Congress
21st	Gordon I. Novod	Democrat	
22nd	Richard A. DiCostanzo*	Rep./Am. Labor	
23rd	Alexander A. Falk*	Dem./Am. Labor	
24th	Lazarus Joseph*	Dem./Am. Labor	on November 6, 1945, elected New York City Comptroller
24th	The seat remained vacant throughout the session of 1946		
25th	Carl Pack*	Dem./Am. Labor	died on August 7, 1945
25th	Arthur Wachtel*	Democrat	on November 6, 1945, elected to fill vacancy
26th	Isidore Dollinger*	Dem./Am. Labor	
27th	Paul A. Fino	Republican	
28th	Lowell H. Brown	Rep./Am. Labor	
29th	William F. Condon*	Republican	
30th	J. Raymond McGovern	Republican	
31st	Pliny W. Williamson*	Republican	
32nd	Thomas C. Desmond*	Republican	
33rd	Frederic H. Bontecou*	Republican	
34th	Arthur H. Wicks*	Republican	Chairman of Finance
35th	Mortimer A. Cullen*	Dem./Am. Labor	
36th	Gilbert T. Seelye*	Republican	
37th	Thomas F. Campbell	Republican	
38th	Benjamin F. Feinberg*	Rep./Am. Labor	re-elected Temporary President
39th	Rhoda Fox Graves*	Republican	
40th	Fred A. Young*	Rep./Dem.	
41st	Vincent R. Corrou	Dem./Am. Labor	
42nd	Isaac B. Mitchell*	Republican	
43rd	Richard P. Byrne	Dem./Am. Labor	
44th	Walter W. Stokes*	Republican	
45th	Floyd E. Anderson*	Republican	
46th	Chauncey B. Hammond*	Republican	
47th	Henry W. Griffith*	Republican	
48th	Earle S. Warner*	Republican	on January 22, 1945, appointed to the New York Supreme Court
48th	Fred S. Hollowell*	Republican	on March 6, 1945, elected to fill vacancy.
49th	Austin W. Erwin*	Republican	
50th	Rodney B. Janes*	Republican	
51st	Allen J. Oliver*	Republican	
52nd	William Bewley*	Rep./Dem.	
53rd	Walter J. Mahoney*	Republican	
54th	Stephen J. Wojtkowiak*	Dem./Am. Labor	died on April 6, 1945
54th	Edmund P. Radwan	Republican	on November 6, 1945, elected to fill vacancy
55th	Charles O. Burney Jr.*	Republican	
56th	George H. Pierce*	Rep./Am. Labor	

=== Employees ===
- Clerk: William S. King
- Assistant Clerk: Pat E. Provenzano

== State Assembly ==
=== Assemblymen ===
Note: For brevity, the chairmanships omit the words "...the Committee on (the)..."

District		Assemblymen	Party	Notes
Albany	1st	Charles C. Wallace	Dem./Am. labor	
Albany	2nd	George W. Foy*	Dem./Am. Labor	
Albany	3rd	James F. Dillon	Dem./Am. Labor	
Allegany		William H. MacKenzie*	Rep./Am. Labor	
Bronx	1st	Patrick J. Fogarty*	Dem./Am. Labor	
Bronx	2nd	Sidney A. Fine	Dem./Am. Labor	
Bronx	3rd	Edward T. Galloway	Dem./Am. Labor	
Bronx	4th	Matthew J. H. McLaughlin*	Democrat	
Bronx	5th	Arthur Wachtel*	Dem./Am. Labor	resigned to run for the State Senate
Bronx	5th	The seat remained vacant throughout the session of 1946		
Bronx	6th	Julius J. Gans*	Dem./Am. Labor	
Bronx	7th	Louis Peck	Democrat	
Bronx	8th	Louis Bennett*	Dem./Am. Labor	
Bronx	9th	Francis T. Murphy	Democrat	
Bronx	10th	John J. DePasquale	Republican	
Bronx	11th	Gladys E. Banks	Republican	
Bronx	12th	Nathan A. Lashin	Dem./Am. Labor	
Bronx	13th	Leo Isacson	Am. Labor/Rep.	
Broome	1st	Richard H. Knauf*	Rep./Am. Labor	
Broome	2nd	Orlo M. Brees*	Republican	
Cattaraugus		Leo P. Noonan*	Republican	
Cayuga		James H. Chase*	Republican	
Chautauqua		E. Herman Magnuson*	Rep./Am. Labor	
Chemung		Harry J. Tifft*	Republican	
Chenango		Irving M. Ives*	Rep./Dem./A.L.	Majority Leader; on November 5, 1946, elected to the U.S. Senate
Clinton		Leslie G. Ryan*	Rep./Am. Labor	
Columbia		Frederick A. Washburn*	Republican	
Cortland		Harold L. Creal*	Republican	
Delaware		Elmer J. Kellam*	Republican	
Dutchess		Ernest I. Hatfield*	Republican	
Erie	1st	Frank A. Gugino*	Republican	
Erie	2nd	Justin C. Morgan*	Republican	
Erie	3rd	William J. Butler*	Republican	
Erie	4th	John P. Quinn*	Dem./Am. Labor	
Erie	5th	Philip V. Baczkowski*	Dem./Am. Labor	
Erie	6th	George F. Dannebrock	Republican	
Erie	7th	Julius Volker	Republican	
Erie	8th	John R. Pillion*	Republican	
Essex		Sheldon F. Wickes*	Rep./Dem.	appointed as County Judge
Essex		L. Judson Morhouse	Republican	on November 6, 1945, elected to fill vacancy
Franklin		William L. Doige*	Rep./Dem.	
Fulton and Hamilton		Joseph R. Younglove*	Rep./Dem.	
Genesee		Herbert A. Rapp*	Republican	
Greene		William E. Brady*	Republican	
Herkimer		Leo A. Lawrence*	Rep./Dem./A.L.	
Jefferson		Orin S. Wilcox	Republican	
Kings	1st	Max M. Turshen*	Dem./Am. Labor	
Kings	2nd	J. Sidney Levine	Dem./Lib.	
Kings	3rd	Mary A. Gillen*	Democrat	
Kings	4th	Bernard Austin*	Dem./Am. Labor	
Kings	5th	John R. Starkey*	Dem./Am. Labor	
Kings	6th	Robert J. Crews*	Rep./Am. Labor	
Kings	7th	John F. Furey*	Dem./Am. Labor	
Kings	8th	Arthur A. Low	Dem./Am. Labor	
Kings	9th	Frank J. McMullen	Republican	
Kings	10th	Lewis W. Olliffe*	Rep./Am. Labor	
Kings	11th	Eugene F. Bannigan*	Dem./Am. Labor	
Kings	12th	James W. Feely*	Dem./Am. Labor	
Kings	13th	Lawrence P. Murphy	Democrat	
Kings	14th	Harry Gittleson*	Dem./Am. Labor	
Kings	15th	John Smolenski*	Democrat	
Kings	16th	Frank J. Pino	Democrat	
Kings	17th	John J. Walsh	Democrat	
Kings	18th	Irwin Steingut*	Dem./Am. Labor	Minority Leader
Kings	19th	Philip J. Schupler	Dem./Lib.	
Kings	20th	John E. Beck	Republican	
Kings	21st	Thomas A. Dwyer*	Dem./Am. Labor	
Kings	22nd	Anthony J. Travia*	Democrat	
Kings	23rd	Alfred A. Lama*	Dem./Am. Labor	
Kings	24th	Philip Blank	Democrat	
Lewis		Benjamin H. Demo*	Rep./Dem.	
Livingston		Joseph W. Ward*	Republican	
Madison		Wheeler Milmoe*	Republican	
Monroe	1st	Frank J. Sellmayer Jr.*	Republican	
Monroe	2nd	Abraham Schulman*	Republican	
Monroe	3rd	George T. Manning*	Republican	
Monroe	4th	Thomas F. Riley*	Republican	
Montgomery		John F. Bennison*	Republican	
Nassau	1st	Frank J. Becker	Republican	
Nassau	2nd	Joseph F. Carlino	Republican	
Nassau	3rd	Genesta M. Strong	Republican	
Nassau	4th	David S. Hill Jr.	Republican	
New York	1st	MacNeil Mitchell*	Republican	
New York	2nd	Louis DeSalvio*	Democrat	
New York	3rd	Owen McGivern*	Democrat	
New York	4th	Leonard Farbstein*	Democrat	
New York	5th	Irwin D. Davidson*	Dem./Am. Labor	
New York	6th	Francis X. McGowan*	Democrat	
New York	7th	Patrick H. Sullivan*	Dem./Am. Labor	
New York	8th	Archibald Douglas Jr.	Republican	
New York	9th	John R. Brook*	Republican	
New York	10th	John P. Morrissey*	Democrat	
New York	11th	William E. Prince	Democrat	
New York	12th	William T. Andrews*	Dem./Am. Labor	
New York	13th	Daniel Flynn*	Democrat	
New York	14th	Hulan E. Jack*	Dem./Am. Labor	
New York	15th	William J. A. Glancy*	Democrat	
New York	16th	Hamlet O. Catenaccio*	Rep./Am. Labor	
Niagara	1st	Jacob E. Hollinger*	Rep./Dem.	
Niagara	2nd	Harry D. Suitor*	Republican	died on March 25, 1945
Niagara	2nd	Ernest Curto	Rep./Am. Labor	on November 6, 1945, elected to fill vacancy
Oneida	1st	Harlow E. Bacon	Republican	
Oneida	2nd	Frank A. Emma*	Dem./Am. Labor	
Onondaga	1st	Leo W. Breed*	Republican	
Onondaga	2nd	Clellan S. Forsythe	Republican	
Onondaga	3rd	Frank J. Costello*	Republican	on November 6, 1945, elected Mayor of Syracuse
Onondaga	3rd	Lawrence M. Rulison	Republican	on December 18, 1945, elected to fill vacancy
Ontario		Harry R. Marble*	Republican	
Orange	1st	Lee B. Mailler*	Republican	
Orange	2nd	Wilson C. Van Duzer*	Republican	
Orleans		John S. Thompson*	Republican	
Oswego		Henry D. Coville*	Republican	
Otsego		Paul L. Talbot	Republican	
Putnam		D. Mallory Stephens*	Republican	Chairman of Ways and Means
Queens	1st	Alexander Del Giorno	Democrat	
Queens	2nd	William E. Clancy*	Dem./Am. Labor	
Queens	3rd	Joseph H. Brinster	Republican	
Queens	4th	Charles J. Dalzell*	Dem./Am. Labor	
Queens	5th	Thomas F. Hurley	Republican	
Queens	6th	William F. Bowe*	Dem./Am. Labor	
Queens	7th	George Archinal*	Republican	
Queens	8th	Samuel Rabin	Republican	
Queens	9th	Fred W. Preller	Republican	
Queens	10th	Angelo Graci	Republican	
Queens	11th	Thomas Fitzpatrick	Dem./Am. Labor	
Queens	12th	John H. Ferril*	Dem./Am. Labor	died on February 23, 1945
Queens	12th	James J. Crisona	Dem./Am. Labor	on November 6, 1945, elected to fill vacancy
Rensselaer		John S. Finch*	Republican	
Richmond	1st	Arthur T. Berge	Republican	
Richmond	2nd	Edmund P. Radigan	Republican	
Rockland		Robert Walmsley*	Republican	
St. Lawrence		Allan P. Sill*	Republican	
Saratoga		Richard J. Sherman*	Republican	appointed as County Judge
Saratoga		John L. Ostrander	Republican	on November 6, 1945, elected to fill vacancy
Schenectady		Oswald D. Heck*	Republican	re-elected Speaker
Schoharie		Arthur L. Parsons*	Republican	
Schuyler		Jerry W. Black	Republican	
Seneca		Lawrence W. Van Cleef*	Republican	
Steuben		William M. Stuart*	Republican	
Suffolk	1st	Edmund R. Lupton*	Republican	
Suffolk	2nd	Elisha T. Barrett*	Republican	
Sullivan		James G. Lyons	Dem./Am. Labor	
Tioga		Myron D. Albro*	Republican	
Tompkins		Stanley C. Shaw*	Republican	
Ulster		John F. Wadlin*	Republican	
Warren		Harry A. Reoux*	Republican	Chairman of Judiciary
Washington		Henry Neddo*	Republican	
Wayne		Henry V. Wilson*	Republican	
Westchester	1st	Malcolm Wilson*	Republican	
Westchester	2nd	Fred A. Graber	Republican	
Westchester	3rd	P. Raymond Sirignano	Republican	
Westchester	4th	Frank S. McCullough	Republican	
Westchester	5th	Christopher H. Lawrence*	Republican	
Westchester	6th	Theodore Hill Jr.*	Republican	
Wyoming		Harold C. Ostertag*	Republican	
Yates		Fred S. Hollowell*	Republican	resigned to run for the State Senate
Yates		Vernon W. Blodgett	Republican	on November 6, 1945, elected to fill vacancy

=== Employees ===
- Clerk: Ansley B. Borkowski

== Sources ==
- Know Your Legislature in The State Employee (January 1945, Vol. 14, No. 1, pg. 20ff)
- Members of the New York Senate (1940s) at Political Graveyard
- Members of the New York Assembly (1940s) at Political Graveyard
