= 162nd New York State Legislature =

New York state legislative session

←	161st	163rd	→
- New York State Capitol (2009)

Overview
- Legislative body: New York State Legislature
- Jurisdiction: New York, United States
- Term: January 1, 1939 – December 31, 1940

Senate
- Members: 51
- President: Lt. Gov. Charles Poletti (D)
- Temporary President: Perley A. Pitcher (R), until February 20, 1939; Joe R. Hanley (R), from February 27, 1939
- Party control: Republican (27–24)

Assembly
- Members: 150
- Speaker: Oswald D. Heck (R)
- Party control: Republican (85–64–1)

Sessions
- 1st: January 4 – May 20, 1939
- 2nd: June 23 – July 10, 1939
- 3rd: January 3 – March 31, 1940
- 4th: October 22, 1940 –

The 162nd New York State Legislature, consisting of the New York State Senate and the New York State Assembly, met from January 4, 1939, to October 22, 1940, during the seventh and eight years of Herbert H. Lehman's governorship, in Albany.

== Background ==
Under the provisions of the New York Constitution of 1894, re-apportioned in 1917, 51 Senators and 150 assemblymen were elected in single-seat districts. The senatorial districts consisted either of one or more entire counties; or a contiguous area within a single county. The counties which were divided into more than one senatorial district were New York (nine districts), Kings (eight), Bronx (three), Erie (three), Monroe (two), Queens (two) and Westchester (two). The Assembly districts were made up of contiguous area, all within the same county.

In November 1937, an amendment to the State Constitution to increase the term in office of the members of the New York State Assembly to two years, and of the statewide elected state officers (Governor, Lieutenant Governor, Comptroller, Attorney General) to four years, was accepted. Thus, beginning at the state election in 1938, all members (senators and assemblymen) of the Legislature were elected to two-year terms.

At this time there were two major political parties: the Democratic Party and the Republican Party. The American Labor Party, the Socialist Party and the Communist Party also nominated tickets. The Socialist Labor Party nominated an "Industrial Government" ticket. The Republicans also nominated an "Independent Progressive" ticket so that their nominee Thomas E. Dewey would appear in two columns on the ballot, like Gov. Lehman who was endorsed by the American Labor Party. In New York City, "City Fusion", "Progressive" and "Liberal" tickets were also nominated.

== Elections ==
The 1938 New York state election was held on November 8. Governor Herbert H. Lehman was re-elected, and Charles Poletti was elected Lieutenant Governor, both Democrats endorsed by the American Labor Party. The other six statewide elective offices were also carried by the Democrats. The approximate party strength at this election, as expressed by the vote for Governor, was: Republicans 2,303,000; Democrats 1,971,000; American Labor 420,000; Communists 106,000; Socialists 25,000; Independent Progressives 24,000; and Industrial Government 3,500.

Both woman legislators—State Senator Rhoda Fox Graves (Rep.), of Gouverneur, and Assemblywoman Jane H. Todd (Rep.), of Tarrytown—were re-elected.

The 1939 New York state election was held on November 7. Two vacancies in the State Senate and six vacancies in the State Assembly were filled. Edith C. Cheney, the widow of Assemblyman Guy W. Cheney, was elected to the seat previously held by her husband.

== Sessions ==
The Legislature met for the first regular session (the 162nd) at the State Capitol in Albany on January 4, 1939; and adjourned on May 20.

Oswald D. Heck (Rep.) was re-elected Speaker.

Perley A. Pitcher (Rep.) was elected Temporary President of the State Senate. Pitcher died on February 20, 1939.

On February 27, 1939, Joe R. Hanley (Rep.) was elected Temporary President of the State Senate.

The Legislature met for a special session at the State Capitol in Albany on June 23, 1939; and adjourned on July 10. This session was called because the New York Court of Appeals had declared the state budget, enacted during the regular session, as unconstitutional, and a new budget was required to be made.

The Legislature met for the second regular session (the 163rd) at the State Capitol in Albany on January 3, 1940; and adjourned at half past midnight on March 31.

The Legislature met for another special session at the State Capitol in Albany on October 22, 1940; and adjourned after a session of four hours. This session was held to enact an extension of three hours to the voting time on the next election day, so that the polls would close at 9 p.m. instead of at 6 p.m.

On November 16, the State Senate rejected, with a vote of 29 to 18, the removal from office of Kings County Judge George W. Martin.

== State Senate ==
=== Districts ===
- 1st District: Nassau and Suffolk counties
- 2nd and 3rd District: Parts of Queens County, i.e. the Borough of Queens
- 4th, 5th, 6th, 7th, 8th, 9th, 10th and 11th District: Parts of Kings County, i.e. the Borough of Brooklyn
- 12th, 13th, 14th, 15th, 16th, 17th, 18th, 19th and 20th District: Parts of New York County, i.e. the Borough of Manhattan
- 21st, 22nd and 23rd District: Parts of Bronx County, i.e. the Borough of the Bronx
- 24th District: Richmond County, i.e. the Borough of Richmond (now the Borough of Staten Island), and Rockland County
- 25th District: Part of Westchester County
- 26th District: Cortlandt, Greenburgh, Mount Pleasant, Ossining and part of Yonkers; in Westchester County
- 27th District: Orange and Sullivan counties
- 28th District: Columbia, Dutchess and Putnam counties
- 29th District: Delaware, Greene and Ulster counties
- 30th District: Albany County
- 31st District: Rensselaer County
- 32nd District: Saratoga and Schenectady counties
- 33rd District: Clinton, Essex, Warren and Washington counties
- 34th District: Franklin and St. Lawrence counties
- 35th District: Fulton, Hamilton, Herkimer and Lewis counties
- 36th District: Oneida County
- 37th District: Jefferson and Oswego counties
- 38th District: Onondaga County
- 39th District: Madison, Montgomery, Otsego and Schoharie counties
- 40th District: Broome, Chenango and Cortland counties
- 41st District: Chemung, Schuyler, Tioga and Tompkins counties
- 42nd District: Cayuga, Seneca and Wayne counties
- 43rd District: Ontario, Steuben and Yates counties
- 44th District: Allegany, Genesee, Livingston and Wyoming
- 45th and 46th District: Monroe County
- 47th District: Niagara and Orleans counties
- 48th, 49th and 50th District: Erie County
- 51st District: Cattaraugus and Chautauqua counties

=== Members ===
The asterisk (*) denotes members of the previous Legislature who continued in office as members of this Legislature. Peter H. Ruvolo, Phelps Phelps, Carl Pack, Fred A. Young and James W. Riley changed from the Assembly to the Senate at the beginning of this Legislature. Assemblymen Daniel Gutman and Chauncey B. Hammond were elected to fill vacancies in the Senate.

Note: For brevity, the chairmanships omit the words "...the Committee on (the)..."

District	Senator	Party	Notes
1st	George L. Thompson*	Republican	Chairman of Finance
2nd	Joseph D. Nunan Jr.*	Democrat	
3rd	Peter T. Farrell*	Democrat	
4th	Philip M. Kleinfeld*	Dem./Am. Labor	
5th	John J. Howard*	Democrat	
6th	Edward J. Coughlin*	Democrat	
7th	Jacob J. Schwartzwald*	Democrat	
8th	Joseph A. Esquirol*	Dem./Progr.	
9th	Peter H. Ruvolo*	Dem./C.F./Progr.	resigned on September 30, 1939
9th	Daniel Gutman	Democrat	on November 7, 1939, elected to fill vacancy
10th	Jeremiah F. Twomey*	Democrat	
11th	James J. Crawford*	Dem./Rep.	
12th	Elmer F. Quinn*	Democrat	
13th	Phelps Phelps*	Democrat	
14th	William J. Murray*	Dem./Progr.	
15th	John L. Buckley*	Dem./Lib.	
16th	John J. McNaboe*	Democrat	
17th	Frederic R. Coudert Jr.	Rep./City F.	
18th	John T. McCall*	Democrat	
19th	Charles D. Perry	Democrat	
20th	A. Spencer Feld*	Democrat	
21st	Lazarus Joseph*	Dem./Lib.	
22nd	Carl Pack*	Dem./City F.	
23rd	John J. Dunnigan*	Dem./City F.	Minority Leader
24th	Rae L. Egbert*	Democrat	
25th	Pliny W. Williamson*	Republican	
26th	William F. Condon	Republican	Chairman of Labor and Industry
27th	Thomas C. Desmond*	Republican	
28th	Allan A. Ryan Jr.	Republican	
29th	Arthur H. Wicks*	Rep./Soc.	
30th	Erastus Corning 2nd*	Democrat	
31st	Clifford C. Hastings*	Republican	
32nd	Gilbert T. Seelye	Republican	Chairman of Pensions
33rd	Benjamin F. Feinberg*	Republican	Chairman of Judiciary
34th	Rhoda Fox Graves*	Rep./Am. Labor	
35th	Fred A. Young	Republican	
36th	William H. Hampton*	Republican	
37th	Perley A. Pitcher*	Republican	elected Temporary President; died on February 20, 1939
37th	Isaac B. Mitchell	Republican	elected on March 28, 1939, to fill vacancy
38th	William C. Martin	Republican	
39th	Walter W. Stokes*	Republican	
40th	Roy M. Page*	Republican	
41st	C. Tracey Stagg*	Republican	committed suicide on July 14, 1939
41st	Chauncey B. Hammond	Republican	on November 7, 1939, elected to fill vacancy
42nd	Henry W. Griffith	Republican	
43rd	Earle S. Warner*	Republican	
44th	Joe R. Hanley*	Republican	on February 27, 1939, elected Temporary President
45th	Rodney B. Janes	Republican	
46th	Karl K. Bechtold	Republican	Chairman of Civil Service
47th	William Bewley	Republican	
48th	Walter J. Mahoney*	Republican	
49th	Stephen J. Wojtkowiak*	Dem./Am. Labor	
50th	Arthur L. Swartz	Republican	died on May 14, 1940
51st	James W. Riley*	Republican	Chairman of Penal Institutions

=== Employees ===
- Clerk: William S. King
- Assistant Clerk: Fred J. Slater

== State Assembly ==
=== Assemblymen ===
Note: For brevity, the chairmanships omit the words "...the Committee on (the)..."

District		Assemblymen	Party	Notes
Albany	1st	George W. Foy*	Democrat	
Albany	2nd	John P. Hayes*	Democrat	
Albany	3rd	John McBain	Republican	
Allegany		William H. MacKenzie*	Republican	
Bronx	1st	Matthew J. H. McLaughlin*	Dem./City F.	
Bronx	2nd	Patrick J. Fogarty*	Dem./Lib.	
Bronx	3rd	Arthur Wachtel	Dem./City F.	
Bronx	4th	Isidore Dollinger*	Dem./City F.	
Bronx	5th	Julius J. Gans	Dem./City F.	
Bronx	6th	Peter A. Quinn*	Dem./City F.	
Bronx	7th	Louis Bennett	Dem./City F.	
Bronx	8th	John A. Devany Jr.*	Democrat	
Broome	1st	Edward F. Vincent*	Republican	died on October 26, 1940
Broome	2nd	Edward W. Walters	Republican	
Cattaraugus		William B. Kingsbury	Republican	
Cayuga		James H. Chase	Republican	
Chautauqua	1st	Lloyd J. Babcock*	Republican	Chairman of Pensions
Chautauqua	2nd	Carl E. Darling*	Republican	
Chemung		Chauncey B. Hammond*	Republican	Chairman of Penal Institutions; resigned on July 27, 1939
Chemung		Harry J. Tifft	Republican	on November 7, 1939, elected to fill vacancy
Chenango		Irving M. Ives*	Republican	Majority Leader
Clinton		Leslie G. Ryan	Republican	
Columbia		Frederick A. Washburn*	Republican	Chairman of Labor and Industries
Cortland		Harold L. Creal	Republican	
Delaware		William T. A. Webb*	Republican	
Dutchess	1st	Howard N. Allen*	Republican	
Dutchess	2nd	Emerson D. Fite*	Republican	Chairman of Civil Service
Erie	1st	Frank A. Gugino*	Republican	
Erie	2nd	Harold B. Ehrlich*	Rep./Am. Labor	
Erie	3rd	William J. Butler*	Republican	
Erie	4th	Anthony J. Canney*	Democrat	
Erie	5th	Joseph S. Kaszubowski	Democrat	
Erie	6th	Jerome C. Kreinheder*	Republican	
Erie	7th	Charles O. Burney Jr.*	Republican	
Erie	8th	R. Foster Piper*	Republican	
Essex		Sheldon F. Wickes	Republican	
Franklin		William L. Doige	Republican	
Fulton and Hamilton		Denton D. Lake*	Republican	Chairman of Aviation
Genesee		Herbert A. Rapp*	Republican	
Greene		Paul Fromer*	Republican	resigned on August 7, 1939
Greene		William E. Brady	Republican	on November 7, 1939, elected to fill vacancy
Herkimer		Leo A. Lawrence*	Republican	
Jefferson		Russell Wright*	Rep./Am. Labor	
Kings	1st	Crawford W. Hawkins*	Democrat	
Kings	2nd	Leo F. Rayfiel	Democrat	
Kings	3rd	Michael J. Gillen*	Democrat	
Kings	4th	Bernard Austin*	Democrat	
Kings	5th	Charles R. McConnell*	Democrat	
Kings	6th	Robert J. Crews*	Rep./Am. Labor	
Kings	7th	William Kirnan*	Democrat	
Kings	8th	Charles J. Beckinella*	Dem./City F.	
Kings	9th	Edgar F. Moran*	Democrat	
Kings	10th	William C. McCreery*	Dem./City F.	
Kings	11th	Bernard J. Moran*	Democrat	
Kings	12th	James W. Feely	Democrat	
Kings	13th	Ralph Schwartz*	Democrat	
Kings	14th	Aaron F. Goldstein	Dem./Lib.	
Kings	15th	John Smolenski*	Democrat	
Kings	16th	Carmine J. Marasco	Democrat	
Kings	17th	Fred G. Moritt*	Democrat	
Kings	18th	Irwin Steingut*	Dem./Am. L./Progr.	Minority Leader
Kings	19th	Max M. Turshen*	Democrat	
Kings	20th	Roy H. Rudd*	Dem./Rep./Progr.	
Kings	21st	Charles H. Breitbart*	Democrat	resigned on October 7, 1939, to run for Municipal Court
Kings	21st	Thomas A. Dwyer	Democrat	on November 7, 1939, elected to fill vacancy
Kings	22nd	Daniel Gutman	Dem./C. F./Progr.	resigned on October 4, 1939, to run for the State Senate
Kings	22nd	James A. Corcoran	Democrat	on November 7, 1939, elected to fill vacancy
Kings	23rd	Robert Giordano	Dem./City F.	
Lewis		Benjamin H. Demo	Republican	
Livingston		James J. Wadsworth*	Republican	
Madison		Wheeler Milmoe*	Republican	
Monroe	1st	Frank J. Sellmayer Jr.*	Republican	
Monroe	2nd	Abraham Schulman*	Republican	
Monroe	3rd	George T. Manning	Republican	
Monroe	4th	Pat E. Provenzano*	Republican	
Monroe	5th	Walter H. Wickins*	Republican	resigned on October 2, 1939
Monroe	5th	William B. Mann	Republican	on November 7, 1939, elected to fill vacancy
Montgomery		L. James Shaver*	Republican	
Nassau	1st	John D. Bennett*	Republican	
Nassau	2nd	Norman F. Penny	Republican	
New York	1st	James J. Dooling*	Democrat	
New York	2nd	Louis J. Capozzoli	Democrat	on November 5, 1940, elected to the 77th U.S. Congress
New York	3rd	Maurice E. Downing	Democrat	
New York	4th	Leonard Farbstein*	Dem./Progr./Lib.	
New York	5th	Owen McGivern	Democrat	
New York	6th	Meyer Goldberg*	Rep./Am. Labor	
New York	7th	Irwin D. Davidson	Democrat	
New York	8th	Stephen J. Jarema*	Democrat	
New York	9th	Ira H. Holley*	Dem./City F.	
New York	10th	MacNeil Mitchell*	Republican	
New York	11th	Patrick H. Sullivan*	Democrat	
New York	12th	Edmund J. Delany*	Democrat	
New York	13th	William J. Sheldrick*	Democrat	
New York	14th	Francis J. McCaffrey Jr.*	Dem./C. F./Progr.	
New York	15th	Abbot Low Moffat*	Rep./City F.	Chairman of Ways and Means
New York	16th	Robert F. Wagner Jr.*	Dem./Am. Labor	
New York	17th	Oscar Garcia Rivera*	Am. Labor	
New York	18th	Joseph A. Boccia	Rep./Am. Labor	
New York	19th	Daniel L. Burrows	Dem./City F.	
New York	20th	Anthony Guida	Dem./Am. L./C. F.	
New York	21st	William T. Andrews*	Dem./Am. Labor	
New York	22nd	Daniel Flynn*	Democrat	
New York	23rd	William J. A. Glancy*	Democrat	
Niagara	1st	Fayette E. Pease*	Republican	
Niagara	2nd	Harry D. Suitor*	Republican	
Oneida	1st	John J. Walsh*	Dem./Am. Labor	
Oneida	2nd	William R. Williams*	Republican	
Oneida	3rd	C. Dean Williams*	Republican	
Onondaga	1st	Leo W. Breed*	Republican	
Onondaga	2nd	George B. Parsons*	Republican	
Onondaga	3rd	Frank J. Costello*	Republican	
Ontario		Harry R. Marble*	Republican	
Orange	1st	Lee B. Mailler*	Republican	
Orange	2nd	Charles N. Hammond*	Republican	
Orleans		John S. Thompson*	Republican	
Oswego		Ernest J. Lonis*	Republican	
Otsego		Chester T. Backus*	Republican	
Putnam		D. Mallory Stephens*	Republican	
Queens	1st	Mario J. Cariello*	Democrat	
Queens	2nd	George F. Torsney	Democrat	
Queens	3rd	John V. Downey*	Democrat	
Queens	4th	Daniel E. Fitzpatrick*	Democrat	
Queens	5th	John H. Ferril	Democrat	
Queens	6th	Joseph P. Teagle*	Democrat	
Rensselaer	1st	Philip J. Casey*	Democrat	
Rensselaer	2nd	Maurice Whitney*	Republican	
Richmond	1st	Charles Bormann*	Democrat	
Richmond	2nd	Albert V. Maniscalco	Democrat	
Rockland		Lawrence J. Murray Jr.*	Democrat	seat vacated on April 4, 1940, when convicted for embezzlement, sentenced to 5 to 10 years in prison
St. Lawrence	1st	Grant F. Daniels	Republican	
St. Lawrence	2nd	Warren O. Daniels*	Republican	
Saratoga		Richard J. Sherman*	Republican	
Schenectady	1st	Oswald D. Heck*	Republican	re-elected Speaker; Chairman of Rules
Schenectady	2nd	Harold Armstrong*	Republican	
Schoharie		Arthur L. Parsons*	Republican	
Schuyler		Dutton Peterson*	Republican	
Seneca		Lawrence W. Van Cleef*	Republican	
Steuben	1st	Guy W. Cheney*	Republican	died on April 18, 1939
Steuben	1st	Edith C. Cheney	Rep./Am. Labor	on November 7, 1939, elected to fill vacancy
Steuben	2nd	William M. Stuart*	Republican	
Suffolk	1st	Edmund R. Lupton*	Republican	
Suffolk	2nd	Elisha T. Barrett*	Republican	
Sullivan		James G. Lyons	Democrat	
Tioga		Myron D. Albro*	Republican	
Tompkins		Stanley C. Shaw*	Republican	
Ulster		J. Edward Conway*	Republican	
Warren		Harry A. Reoux*	Republican	Chairman of Judiciary
Washington		Herbert A. Bartholomew*	Republican	
Wayne		Harry L. Averill*	Republican	
Westchester	1st	Christopher H. Lawrence*	Republican	
Westchester	2nd	Theodore Hill Jr.*	Republican	
Westchester	3rd	James E. Owens*	Republican	
Westchester	4th	Jane H. Todd*	Republican	
Westchester	5th	Malcolm Wilson	Republican	
Wyoming		Harold C. Ostertag*	Republican	Chairman of Affairs of Villages
Yates		Fred S. Hollowell*	Republican	

=== Employees ===
- Clerk: Ansley B. Borkowski

== Sources ==
- N.Y. State Legislature—1939–40 in The State Employee (November 1938, Vol. 7, No. 8, pg. 14 and 16)
- Members of the New York Senate (1930s) at Political Graveyard
- Members of the New York Assembly (1930s) at Political Graveyard
- Standing Committees of Legislature in The State Employee (February 1939, Vol. 8, No. 2, pg. 34)
