= Eugene Keogh =

American politician (1907–1989)

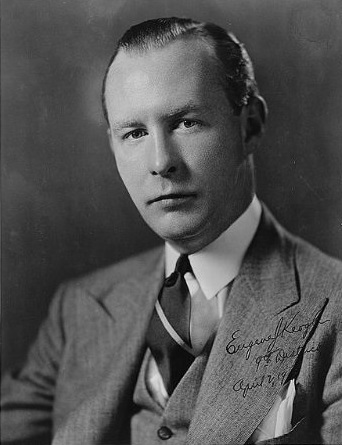
- Keogh in 1943

Member of the U.S. House of Representatives from New York
- In office January 3, 1937 – January 3, 1967
- Preceded by: Stephen A. Rudd
- Succeeded by: Frank J. Brasco
- Constituency: 9th district (1937–63); 11th district (1963–67)

Member of the New York State Assembly from the 20th Kings County district
- In office January 1, 1936 – December 31, 1936
- Preceded by: Joseph J. Monahan
- Succeeded by: Roy H. Rudd

Personal details
- Born: Eugene James Keogh; August 30, 1907 Brooklyn, New York, U.S.
- Died: May 26, 1989 (aged 81) New York City, U.S.
- Resting place: Gate of Heaven Cemetery
- Party: Democratic
- Education: New York University; Fordham University School of Law

Eugene James Keogh (August 30, 1907 – May 26, 1989) was an American lawyer and politician who served as a member of the United States House of Representatives from New York. He served 15 terms from 1937 to 1967.

== Background ==
Keogh was born on August 30, 1907, in Brooklyn, New York City. He graduated from New York University in 1927 and from Fordham University School of Law in 1930.

== Career ==
He was a member of the New York State Assembly (Kings Co., 20th D.) in 1936.

=== Congress ===
He was elected as a Democrat to the 75th through the 89th United States Congresses, holding office from January 3, 1937, to January 3, 1967. He served on the House Ways and Means committee and sponsored the original legislation for the Keogh plan, a type of pension plan. In 1947-8, he served on the Herter Committee.

He was also a member of the New York State Racing and Wagering Board from 1973 until 1976.

== Death ==
He died on May 26, 1989, in New York City and was buried at Gate of Heaven Cemetery in Hawthorne, New York.

== Sources ==
- United States Congress. "Eugene Keogh (id: K000130)". Biographical Directory of the United States Congress.

New York State Assembly
Preceded by Joseph J. Monahan	New York State Assembly; Kings County, 20th District; 1936	Succeeded by Roy H. Rudd
U.S. House of Representatives
Preceded by Stephen A. Rudd	Member of the U.S. House of Representatives from New York's 9th congressional district 1937–1963	Succeeded by James J. Delaney
Preceded by Emanuel Celler	Member of the U.S. House of Representatives from New York's 11th congressional district 1963–1967	Succeeded by Frank J. Brasco
