= John H. Ferril =

American politician

John Henry Ferril (December 29, 1873 – February 23, 1945) was an American businessman and politician from New York.

== Biography ==
Ferril was born on December 29, 1873, in Brooklyn. He engaged in the real estate business. He was Secretary of the Long Island Real Estate Board. He was President of the Board of Real Estate Brokers of Rockaway Park, Belle Harbor and Neponsit.

Ferril was a member of the New York State Assembly from 1939 until his death in 1945, sitting in the 162nd, 163rd, 164th and 165th New York State Legislatures.

He died on February 23, 1945, in Queens, New York City.

== Sources ==
New York State Assembly
Preceded by William F. Dailey	New York State Assembly; Queens County, 5th District; 1939–1944	Succeeded by Thomas F. Hurley
Preceded by new district	New York State Assembly; Queens County, 12th District; 1945	Succeeded by James J. Crisona
