= James A. Corcoran (Brooklyn) =

American politician

James A. Corcoran (c. 1880 – January 10, 1949) was an American politician from New York.

== Life ==
He was born about 1880. In 1905, he married Mary Genevieve DeLacy, and they had two children. He engaged in the real estate and insurance business.

Corcoran was elected on November 7, 1939, to the New York State Assembly (Kings Co., 22nd D.), to fill the vacancy caused by the resignation of Daniel Gutman, and took his seat in the 162nd New York State Legislature in January 1940. He was re-elected in 1940 and 1942, and remained in the Assembly until 1943, sitting in the 163rd and 164th New York State Legislatures. He resigned his seat on August 6, 1943, to run for the State Senate seat vacated by the resignation of Daniel Gutman.

Corcoran was elected on November 2, 1943, to the New York State Senate, and took his seat in the 164th New York State Legislature in January 1944. He was re-elected in 1944, and remained in the Senate until 1946, sitting in the 165th New York State Legislature. In 1946, he ran for re-election, but was defeated by American Laborite Kenneth Sherbell.

Corcoran died on January 10, 1949, at his home at 167 Barbey Street in Brooklyn.

== Sources ==
New York State Assembly
Preceded by Daniel Gutman	New York State Assembly; Kings County, 22nd District; 1940–1943	Succeeded by Anthony J. Travia
New York State Senate
Preceded by Daniel Gutman	New York State Senate; 9th District; 1944	Succeeded by Roy H. Rudd
Preceded by Jeremiah F. Twomey	New York State Senate; 10th District; 1945–1946	Succeeded by Kenneth Sherbell
