= Isaac B. Mitchell =

American farmer and politician

Member of the New York State Senate from the 42nd district
- In office January 1, 1945 – June 12, 1947
- Preceded by: Henry W. Griffith
- Succeeded by: Henry A. Wise

Member of the New York State Senate from the 37th district
- In office 1939 – December 31, 1944
- Preceded by: Perley A. Pitcher
- Succeeded by: Thomas F. Campbell

Personal details
- Born: Isaac Beardsley Mitchell; 1888 near La Fargeville, New York, U.S.
- Died: 1977 (aged 88–89)
- Resting place: Grove Cemetery, La Fargeville, New York, U.S.
- Party: Republican
- Spouse: Florence Staley (m. 1908; died 1967)
- Children: 2
- Occupation: Politician, farmer

Isaac Beardsley Mitchell (1888–1977) was an American farmer and politician from New York.

== Life ==
He was born in 1888 on the family farm near La Fargeville, Jefferson County, New York, the son of Hiram B. Mitchell (1845–1921) and Minnie (Beardsley) Mitchell (1846–1928). In 1908, he married Florence Staley (1885–1967), and they had two children. He raised Holstein Friesian cattle, and engaged in the dairy business.

He was elected on March 28, 1939, to the New York State Senate, to fill the vacancy caused by the death of Perley A. Pitcher. He remained in the State Senate until 1947, sitting in the 162nd, 163rd, 164th, 165th and 166th New York State Legislatures. He resigned his seat on June 12, 1947.

He died in 1977; and was buried at the Grove Cemetery in La Fargeville.

== Sources ==
New York State Senate
Preceded by Perley A. Pitcher	New York State Senate; 37th District; 1939–1944	Succeeded by Thomas F. Campbell
Preceded by Henry W. Griffith	New York State Senate; 42nd District; 1945–1947	Succeeded by Henry A. Wise
