= Charles Muzzicato =

American physician and politician

Charles Muzzicato (March 1, 1901 – December 1968) was an American physician and politician from New York.

== Life ==
He was born on March 1, 1901. He attended the public schools in Manhattan and Rhodes Preparatory School. He graduated from Alfred University, and M.D. from Loyola University Chicago. Then he interned at the Metropolitan Hospital Center, and later specialised in radiology, studying at the New York Post Graduate Hospital and Columbia College of Physicians and Surgeons.

Muzzicato was a member of the New York State Senate (18th D.) in 1941 and 1942. At the New York state election, 1942, he ran on the Republican ticket for one of New York's at-large congressional seats, but was defeated by Democrat Matthew J. Merritt.

He died in December 1968; and was buried at the Ascension Cemetery in Monsey, New York.

== Sources ==
New York State Senate
| Preceded by John T. McCall | New York State Senate; 18th District; 1941–1942 | Succeeded by Richard A. DiCostanzo |
