= Christopher D. Sullivan =

American politician

Christopher Daniel Sullivan
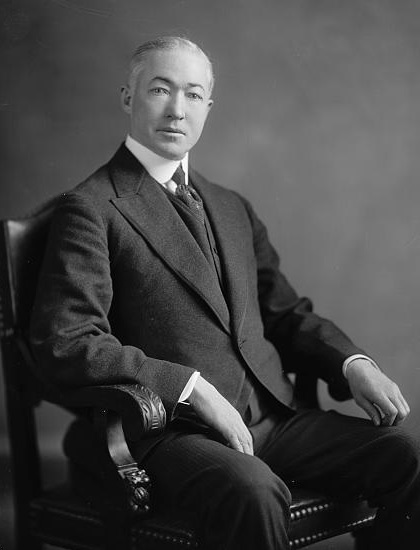

Member of the U.S. House of Representatives from New York's 13th district
- In office March 4, 1917 – January 3, 1941
- Preceded by: George W. Loft
- Succeeded by: Louis J. Capozzoli

Member of the New York Senate from the 11th district
- In office January 1, 1909 – November 7, 1916
- Preceded by: Dominick F. Mullaney
- Succeeded by: Bernard Downing

Member of the New York Senate from the 13th district
- In office January 1, 1907 – December 31, 1908
- Preceded by: Bernard F. Martin
- Succeeded by: William J. A. Caffrey

Personal details
- Born: July 14, 1870 New York City, U.S.
- Died: August 3, 1942 (aged 72) New York City, U.S.
- Party: Democratic
- Spouse: Helen Sullivan (1875–1907)
- Children: Christopher Sullivan Jr (1897), Isabel Sullivan (1899), Helen Sullivan (1902), Estelle Sullivan (1903), Vincent Sullivan (1905–1910)
- Occupation: Real Estate, State Senator, United States Congressman

Christopher Daniel Sullivan (July 14, 1870 – August 3, 1942) was an American politician from New York who served twelve terms as a United States congressman from 1917 to 1941.

== Life ==
Born in New York City, he attended the public schools, St. James Parochial School, and St. Mary's Academy. Then he engaged in the real-estate business, and entered politics, joining Tammany Hall.

=== Political career ===
==== State Senate ====
He was a member of the New York State Senate from 1907 to 1916, sitting in the 130th through 139th New York State Legislatures.

==== Congress ====
In 1916, Sullivan was elected as a Democrat to the 65th United States Congress. He was subsequently re-elected 11 times, serving through the 76th Congress. In all, he held office from March 4, 1917, to January 3, 1941.

While in the House he was Chairman of the Committee on Expenditures in the Department of Labor (65th Congress).

Sullivan did not seek re-election in 1940.

=== Retirement and death ===
He resided in New York City until his death in 1942. He was interred at Calvary Cemetery in Woodside, New York.

=== Family ===
State Senator Charles D. Perry (1907–1964) was his nephew. Charles was the son of Christopher's half-brother Henry Charles Perry, known as Harry Perry. (Harry was also involved in New York politics.)

New York State Senate
Preceded by Bernard F. Martin	New York State Senate; 13th District; 1907–1908	Succeeded by William J. A. Caffrey
Preceded by Dominick F. Mullaney	New York State Senate; 11th District; 1909–1916	Succeeded by Bernard Downing
U.S. House of Representatives
Preceded by George W. Loft	Member of the U.S. House of Representatives from New York's 13th congressional district 1917–1941	Succeeded by Louis Capozzoli
