= Peter H. Ruvolo =

American politician

Peter H. Ruvolo

Peter H. Ruvolo (August 31, 1895 – January 27, 1943) was an American lawyer and politician from New York.

== Life ==
He was born on August 31, 1895, in Alcamo, Sicily, Italy. In 1906, when he was only eleven years old, his family moved to Brooklyn on the ship Sicllian Prince. In 1909 he won a scholarship to Brooklyn Prep and, some years later, he got a scholarship for a full course at St. St. Francis Xavier College, where he graduated magna cum laude. besides he won a scholarship for post-graduate studies at the Catholic University in Washington, D. C.

After the outbreak of World War I he served in the U.S. Army, as a major in the infantry. In 1921 he graduated from Fordham Law School, in 1922 was admitted to the bar, as a lawyer, and practiced in Brooklyn. He married Catherine Foran, and they had four children.

After the abolition of the Board of Aldermen, where he was a member for more than two terms, Peter H. Ruvolo, ran for the Assembly in the 22nd District in 1938 and was elected.

He was an active member, for more than 10 years, of the Democratic club in that district, and its vice-president, Ruvolo first entered public office when in 1934 he was named in substitution of the Alderman James J. Morris. He was elected for two more mandates and was very helpful in obtaining parks, playgrounds and other changes for East New York.

In 1938, after being elected to New York State Assembly, he became famous for his debating ability. The next year he struggled for the extension of allowances to the blind, widows and orphans.

He died of heart disease on January 27, 1943, in the Lutheran Hospital in Brooklyn, and was buried at St. John Cemetery in Middle Village, Queens.

=== Career ===
- alderman of New York City in November 1934, to fill the vacancy caused by the death of James J. Morris.
- Re-elected in 1935, and remained on the Board of Aldermen until 1937.
- Member of New York State Assembly from Kings County 22nd District, 1938, in 1938
- Member of New York State Senate (9th D.) in 1939, 1939,
- Resigned his seat on September 30, 1939, to run for the Municipal Court.
- Municipal judge in New York City Municipal Court (7th D.), from 1940 until 1943

New York State Assembly
Preceded by Clement A. Shelton	New York State Assembly; Kings County, 22nd District; 1938	Succeeded by Daniel Gutman
New York State Senate
Preceded by Jacob H. Livingston	New York State Senate; 9th District; 1939	Succeeded by Daniel Gutman

== See also ==
- Alcamo
- Charley Fusari
- Pietro Montana

== Sources ==
- Shadow box
- SENATOR RUVOLO RESIGNS; Brooklyn Candidate for Bench Quits His State Post
