= Dutton Peterson =

American politician (1894–1964)

Dutton Stiles Peterson (December 10, 1894 – October 20, 1964) was an American Methodist minister and politician from New York.

== Background ==
He was born in Costello, Potter County, Pennsylvania. His father, Chris Peterson, was an immigrant from Hollen Municipality in Telemark county, Norway. The family removed in 1911 to Steuben County, New York. In 1917, he enlisted in the U.S. Marine Corps and fought in World War I in France. After the war he graduated from Practical Bible Training School (now Davis College) in 1922 and King's School of Oratory. He graduated B.A. from Ohio Wesleyan University in 1924; and from Boston University School of Theology in 1927. He became a Methodist minister, and was the pastor of the Methodist Church in Odessa, Schuyler County, New York, from 1937 to 1960.

== Political career ==
He entered politics as a Republican. Peterson was a member of the New York State Assembly (Schuyler Co.) in 1937, 1938, 1939–40 and 1941–42. He was a member of the New York State Senate from 1953 until his death in 1964, sitting in the 169th, 170th, 171st, 172nd, 173rd and 174th New York State Legislatures.

== Personal life ==
In 1922, he married Martha Melintha Robinson (1899–1985). The couple had six children. He died in Schuyler Hospital in Montour Falls, New York, of a heart attack; and was buried at the Laurel Hill Cemetery in Odessa.

== Sources ==
New York State Assembly
Preceded by Floyd E. Meeks	New York State Assembly; Schuyler County; 1937–1942	Succeeded by Edward K. Corwin
New York State Senate
Preceded by Chauncey B. Hammond	New York State Senate; 46th District; 1953–1954	Succeeded by Wheeler Milmoe
Preceded by George T. Manning	New York State Senate; 50th District; 1955–1964	Succeeded by Bryce Barden
