= Chauncey B. Hammond =

American politician

Chauncey Brainerd Hammond (November 5, 1882 – February 11, 1952) was an American politician from New York.

== Life ==
He was born on November 5, 1882, on the family's farm in the town of Elmira, Chemung County, New York. He worked for the Erie Railroad.

He was a member of the New York State Assembly (Chemung Co.) in 1935, 1936, 1937, 1938 and 1939; and was Chairman of the Committee on Penal Institutions from 1938 to 1939. He resigned his seat on July 27, 1939, to run for the senate seat vacated by the suicide of C. Tracey Stagg. He would win the election by 18,412 votes over W. Harry McConnell.

Hammond was a member of the New York State Senate from 1940 until his death in 1952, sitting in the 162nd, 163rd, 164th, 165th, 166th, 167th and 168th New York State Legislatures.

Hammond died on February 11, 1952 at his hotel room in Albany, age 69. He had the hotel get a physician around 9:00 p.m. that evening and the responding doctor declared him dead two hours later due to natural causes. After a funeral service was held in Binghamton, Hammond was buried in the afternoon of February 15 at Woodlawn Cemetery in Elmira under Episcopal and Masonic honors.

== Sources ==
New York State Assembly
Preceded by Thomas Jacob Banfield	New York State Assembly; Chemung County; 1935–1939	Succeeded by Harry J. Tifft
New York State Senate
Preceded by C. Tracey Stagg	New York State Senate; 41st District; 1940–1944	Succeeded by Vincent R. Corrou
Preceded by Allen J. Oliver	New York State Senate; 46th District; 1945–1952	Succeeded by Dutton Peterson
