= Daniel Gutman =

American politician

Daniel Gutman (July 1, 1901 – September 1993) was an American lawyer, politician, judge, and law school dean from New York.

== Early life ==
Gutman was born on July 1, 1901, in New York. He attended Boys High School. He received his degree from Brooklyn Law School in 1922.

== Prosecutor ==
He then served as Assistant United States Attorney for the Eastern District of New York, Assistant United States Attorney General, and an Assistant District Attorney of Kings County.

== Political career ==
Gutman was a member of the New York State Assembly (Kings Co., 22nd D.) in 1939. He resigned his seat on October 4, 1939, to run for the State Senate. He was a member of the New York State Senate (9th D.) from 1940 to 1943, sitting in the 162nd, 163rd, and 164th New York State Legislatures. He resigned his seat on August 9, 1943, to run for the Municipal Court.

== Judge ==
He was a justice of the New York City Municipal Court from 1944 to 1954; and during the latter year was appointed by New York City Mayor Robert F. Wagner, Jr. as Presiding Justice of the Municipal Court. He resigned at the end of 1954.

== Counsel to governor ==
He was appointed as Counsel to the Governor by W. Averell Harriman in 1955. He remained on that post until the end of Harriman's term in 1958.

== Law school dean ==
Gutman was Dean of New York Law School from 1959 to 1968.

After hearing highly decorated 45-year-old policeman Mario Biaggi speak at an event, Dean Gutman offered him a full scholarship to New York Law School. The American Bar Association granted Biaggi a special dispensation to study law due to his distinguished police career, even though he had never gone to college and a college degree was a prerequisite for law school. In 1965, Biaggi graduated from the law school with an LLB. In 1966, at the age of 49, he was admitted to the New York State Bar and founded the law firm Biaggi & Ehrlich, and thereafter he became a US Congressman.

Gutman died in September 1993 at his home in Carmel in Putnam County, New York.

New York State Assembly
Preceded by Peter H. Ruvolo	New York State Assembly; Kings County, 22nd District; 1939	Succeeded by James A. Corcoran
New York State Senate
Preceded by Peter H. Ruvolo	New York State Senate; 9th District; 1940–1943	Succeeded by James A. Corcoran
