= John L. Buckley =

American lawyer and politician

John L. Buckley (born March 9, 1900) was an American lawyer and politician from New York.He served as a state senator in New York and was a leader of the “Irish bloc” in Tammany Hall.

== Biography ==
Born in New York City, Buckley attended Xavier High School and Fordham University. He graduated from Fordham University School of Law in 1923, and practiced law in New York City.

Buckley was a member of the New York State Assembly (New York Co., 7th D.) in 1925 and 1926.

He was a member of the New York State Senate (15th D.) from 1927 to 1942, sitting in the 150th, 151st, 152nd, 153rd, 154th, 155th, 156th, 157th, 158th, 159th, 160th, 161st, 162nd and 163rd New York State Legislatures.

He was the Tammany Hall district leader of the 7th, and later the 5th (after re-apportionment in 1943) assembly district from 1939 to 1949.

He was a delegate to the New York State Convention to Ratify the 21st Amendment in 1933; and to the 1940, 1944 and 1948 Democratic National Conventions.

New York State Assembly
Preceded by Victor R. Kaufmann	New York State Assembly; New York County, 7th District; 1925–1926	Succeeded by Saul S. Streit
New York State Senate
Preceded by Nathan Straus Jr.	New York State Senate; 15th District; 1927–1942	Succeeded by Lester Baum
