= Simon J. Liebowitz =

American politician (1905–1998)

Member of the New York State Senate
- In office January 1, 1960 – December 31, 1968
- Preceded by: Herbert I. Sorin
- Succeeded by: A. Frederick Meyerson
- Constituency: 10th district (1960-1965); 18th district (1966); 15th district (1967-1968)

Personal details
- Born: June 5, 1905 Brooklyn, New York, U.S.
- Died: May 24, 1998 (aged 92) Palm Beach, Florida, U.S.
- Party: Democratic

Simon J. Liebowitz (June 5, 1905 – May 24, 1998) was an American lawyer and politician from New York.

== Life ==
He was born on June 5, 1905, in Brooklyn, New York City. He attended Public School No. 129 and Boys High School. He graduated from the City College of New York, and from Brooklyn Law School in 1926. He practiced law in New York City. He married Esther Nitzburg and together they had two children. They remained married until Esther's death at age 43. He thereafter married Elsie Chasanoff (1908–2007), who was a widow and had one daughter and together they formed a new family with all three of their offspring.

Liebowitz was a member of the New York State Senate from 1960 to 1968, sitting in the 172nd, 173rd, 174th, 175th, 176th and 177th New York State Legislatures.

In November 1968, he was elected to the New York City Civil Court; and in November 1969, to the New York Supreme Court. He remained on the bench until the end of 1975 when he reached the constitutional age limit. Afterwards he resumed the practice of law and remained active in various capacities of the law until his death.

He died on May 24, 1998, in Good Samaritan Hospital in Palm Beach, Florida.

== Sources ==
New York State Senate
Preceded by Herbert I. Sorin	Member of the New York State Senate from the 10th district 1960–1965	Succeeded by Irving Mosberg
Preceded by Edward S. Lentol	Member of the New York State Senate from the 18th district 1966	Succeeded by William C. Thompson
Preceded by Martin J. Knorr	Member of the New York State Senate from the 15th district 1967–1968	Succeeded by A. Frederick Meyerson
