= Martin J. Knorr =

American politician (1906–1989)

Member of the New York State Senate
- In office January 1, 1969 – December 31, 1988
- Preceded by: William C. Brennan
- Succeeded by: Serphin R. Maltese
- Constituency: 12th district (1969-1972); 15th district (1973-1988)
- In office January 1, 1966 – December 31, 1966
- Preceded by: Irwin Brownstein
- Succeeded by: William C. Brennan
- Constituency: 15th district

Member of the New York State Assembly from the Queens County 3rd district
- In office January 1, 1953 – December 31, 1954
- Preceded by: Anthony R. Carus
- Succeeded by: Charles T. Eckstein

Personal details
- Born: January 31, 1906 Brooklyn, New York, U.S.
- Died: October 7, 1989 (aged 83) Long Beach, New York, U.S.
- Party: Republican

Martin J. Knorr (January 31, 1906 – October 7, 1989) was an American lawyer and politician from New York.

== Early life and education ==
He was born on January 31, 1906, in Williamsburg, Brooklyn, New York City. He graduated from Dartmouth College and Brooklyn Law School. He practiced law, and lived in Ridgewood, Queens.

== Career ==
Knorr was a member of the New York State Assembly (Queens Co., 3rd D.) in 1953 and 1954.

He was a member of the New York State Senate (15th D.) in 1966. In November 1966, after re-apportionment, he ran in the 12th District for re-election, but was defeated by Democrat William C. Brennan.

Knorr was again a member of the State Senate from 1969 to 1988, sitting in the 178th, 179th, 180th, 181st, 182nd, 183rd, 184th, 185th, 186th and 187th New York State Legislatures. In January 1985, he became Assistant Majority Whip.

== Death ==
He died on October 7, 1989, at the home of one of his daughters in Long Beach, New York.

== Sources ==
New York State Assembly
| Preceded by Anthony R. Carus | Member of the New York State Assembly from the Queens County 3rd district 1953–1954 | Succeeded by Charles T. Eckstein |
New York State Senate
| Preceded by Irwin Brownstein | Member of the New York State Senate from the 15th district 1966 | Succeeded by Simon J. Liebowitz |
| Preceded by William C. Brennan | Member of the New York State Senate from the 12th district 1969–1972 | Succeeded by Jack E. Bronston |
| Preceded by A. Frederick Meyerson | Member of the New York State Senate from the 15th district 1973–1988 | Succeeded by Serphin R. Maltese |
