= Kenneth Sherbell =

American politician (1917–1998)

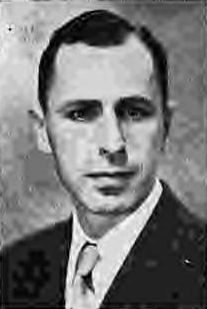
- Sherbell c. 1946

Member of the New York Senate from the 10th district
- In office January 1, 1947 – December 31, 1948
- Preceded by: James A. Corcoran
- Succeeded by: Herbert I. Sorin

Kenneth Sherbell (April 12, 1917 – January 23, 1998) was an American labor union leader and politician from New York, known for his contributions to labor rights and public service.

== Life ==
He was born on April 12, 1917, in South Coventry, Tolland County, Connecticut. The family removed to East New York, Brooklyn. He attended the public schools and graduated from Brooklyn College. While still in college, he began to work in a dry-goods store, and joined Local 65 of the Wholesale and Warehouse Workers Union, affiliated with the CIO. Later he became a union leader and became active in politics as a member of the American Labor Party. In 1939, he married Evelyn Berkowitz, and they had two children. From May 1943 to December 1945, he served in the U.S. Navy as an aviation machinist's mate, 2nd class.

In November 1946, Sherbell was elected on the American Labor ticket, with Republican endorsement, to the New York State Senate (10th D.), defeating the Democratic incumbent James A. Corcoran. Sherbell was a member of the State Senate in 1947 and 1948. During the 1948 United States presidential election, he supported Henry A. Wallace and ran on the American Labor/Wallace–Progressive ticket for re-election, but was defeated by Democrat Herbert I. Sorin.

Afterwards he remained active in organized labor, worked in group insurance, and was president of a company which offered health insurance plans for unions.

He died on January 23, 1998, in Parkway Hospital in Queens, New York City. He was Jewish.

== Sources ==
New York State Senate
| Preceded by James A. Corcoran | New York State Senate; 10th District; 1947–1948 | Succeeded by Herbert I. Sorin |
