= Arthur Wachtel =

American lawyer and politician (1904–1997)

Arthur Wachtel (September 24, 1904 – June 26, 1997) was an American lawyer and politician from New York.

== Early life and education ==
He was born on September 24, 1904, in New York City. He graduated LL.B. from Columbia Law School in 1928.

== Career ==
Wachtel was a member of the New York State Assembly from 1939 to 1945, sitting in the 162nd, 163rd, 164th and 165th New York State Legislatures. In 1945, he resigned his seat to run for the State Senate seat vacated by the death of Carl Pack.

Wachtel was a member of the New York State Senate from 1946 to 1954, sitting in the 165th, 166th, 167th, 168th and 169th New York State Legislatures. In 1954, he resigned his seat and was appointed to the Municipal Court (Bronx, 1st D.). In November 1954, he was elected to succeed himself and, in 1964, was re-elected. He retired from the Civil Court bench at the end of 1974.

== Personal life ==
On June 26, 1932, he married Elizabeth (born c. 1910), and they had one son: Daniel Leonard Wachtel (born c. 1937).

== Death ==
He died on June 26, 1997; and was buried at the Riverside Cemetery in Saddle Brook, New Jersey. He was Jewish.

== Sources ==
New York State Assembly
Preceded by Carl Pack	New York State Assembly; Bronx County, 3rd District; 1939–1944	Succeeded by Edward T. Galloway
Preceded by Julius J. Gans	New York State Assembly; Bronx County, 5th District; 1945	Succeeded by Joseph A. Martinis
New York State Senate
Preceded by Carl Pack	New York State Senate; 25th District; 1946–1954	Succeeded by Francis J. Mahoney
