= Jeremiah F. Twomey =

American politician (1874–1963)

Jeremiah F. Twomey (June 16, 1874 in Brooklyn, Kings County, New York – October 3, 1963 in Jamaica, Queens, New York City) was an American politician from New York.

== Life ==
He attended school in Long Island City, and then became a pharmacist. He married Mary J. Monahan (1884–1963), and their only child was Palma J. (Twomey) Sullivan (born c.1907).

Twomey was a member of the New York State Assembly (Kings Co., 15th D.) in 1916, 1917 and 1918.

He was a member of the New York State Senate (10th D.) from 1919 to 1944, sitting in the 142nd, 143rd, 144th, 145th, 146th, 147th, 148th, 149th, 150th, 151st, 152nd, 153rd, 154th, 155th, 156th, 157th, 158th, 159th, 160th, 161st, 162nd, 163rd and 164th New York State Legislatures; and was Chairman of the Committee on Finance from 1933 to 1938.

He died on October 3, 1963, in Queens General Hospital in Jamaica, Queens.

== Sources ==
- "Guide for Voters by Citizens Union" (PDF). The New York Times. October 28, 1917.
- "Palma J. Twomey's Plans; State Senator's Daughter to Be Wed to W. A. Sullivan Dec. 28". The New York Times. November 24, 1935.
- "J. F. Twomey, 89, Ex-State Senator". The New York Times. October 4, 1963.
- Twomey family at Ancestry.com
- The State Employee (Vol. 6, No. 5; June 1937; with portrait on pg. 9)

New York State Assembly
Preceded by James J. Phelan	New York State Assembly; Kings County, 15th District; 1916–1918	Succeeded by Christian J. McWilliams
New York State Senate
Preceded by Alfred J. Gilchrist	New York State Senate; 10th District; 1919–1944	Succeeded by James A. Corcoran
