= George H. Pierce =

American politician

George H. Pierce (June 27, 1872 – October 22, 1967) was an American lawyer and Senator from New York.

== Life ==
He was born on June 27, 1872, in Humphrey, Cattaraugus County, New York, the son of Harlow Pierce (1833–1910) and Lydia (Stevens) Pierce. He attended the district schools and Ten Broeck Academy in Franklinville. Then he read law, was admitted to the bar in 1898, and practiced law in Olean. On May 8, 1902, he married Caroline L. Smith, and their only son was Harlow William Pierce (1905–1948).

He was a Justice of the Peace in the Town of Allegany; Police Justice of the Village of Allegany; President of the Board of Education of Allegany; Village Attorney of Allegany for four years; and Mayor of Olean from 1924 to 1929.

Pierce was a member of the New York State Senate from 1943 to 1962, sitting in the 164th, 165th, 166th, 167th, 168th, 169th, 170th, 171st, 172nd and 173rd New York State Legislatures. He was Chairman of the Committee on the Judiciary from 1959 to 1962.

He died on October 22, 1967, in St. Francis Hospital in Olean, New York; and was buried at the Allegany Cemetery in Allegany.

== Sources ==
New York State Senate
Preceded by James W. Riley	New York State Senate; 51st District; 1943–1944	Succeeded by Allen J. Oliver
Preceded by new district	New York State Senate; 56th District; 1945–1954	Succeeded by Stanley J. Bauer
Preceded by new district	New York State Senate; 58th District; 1955–1962	Succeeded by Jeremiah J. Moriarty
