= Roy H. Rudd =

American lawyer and politician

Roy H. Rudd (July 17, 1906 – November 1, 1997) was an American lawyer and politician from New York.

== Life ==
He was born on July 17, 1906, in Brooklyn, New York City, the son of Congressman Stephen A. Rudd (1874–1936) and Martha (Lindsay) Rudd. He married Rose Ann Murphy, and their only child was Roy H. Rudd Jr.

Rudd was a member of the New York State Assembly (Kings Co., 20th D.) in 1937, 1938, 1939–40, 1941–42 and 1943–1944; and a member of the New York State Senate (9th D.) in 1945 and 1946. In 1946, he ran for re-election, but was defeated by Republican Richard McCleery.

He was an Assistant District Attorney of Kings County until August 1951.

In October 1960, he was appointed by New York City Schools Superintendent John J. Theobald as the Legislative Representative of the School Board.

He died in November 1997; and was buried at the Cemetery of the Evergreens in Brooklyn.

Assemblyman Robert J. Rudd and Congressman George H. Lindsay (1837–1916) were his grandfathers; and Congressman George W. Lindsay (1865–1938) was his uncle.

== Sources ==
New York State Assembly
Preceded by Eugene J. Keogh	New York State Assembly; Kings County, 20th District; 1937–1944	Succeeded by John E. Beck
New York State Senate
Preceded by James A. Corcoran	New York State Senate; 9th District; 1945–1946	Succeeded by Richard McCleery
