= A. Frederick Meyerson =

American politician (1918–2009)

Member of the New York State Senate
- In office January 1, 1969 – March 1976
- Preceded by: Simon J. Liebowitz
- Succeeded by: Howard E. Babbush
- Constituency: 16th district (1969-1972); 15th district (1973-1976)

Personal details
- Born: February 2, 1918
- Died: June 29, 2009 (aged 91)
- Party: Democratic
- Spouse: Shirley
- Children: 2
- Education: Thomas Jefferson High School; St. John's University; St. John's University School of Law
- Profession: Politician, lawyer

A. Frederick Meyerson (February 2, 1918 – June 29, 2009) was an American lawyer and politician from New York.

== Life ==
He was born on February 2, 1918. He attended Thomas Jefferson High School. He graduated from St. John's College of Liberal Arts and Sciences, and from St. John's University School of Law. He was admitted to the bar in 1944, and was employed by the Bureau of Internal Revenue. Later he was law clerk to a Supreme Court Justice. He married Shirley, and they had two children.

Meyerson was a member of the New York State Senate from 1969 to 1976, sitting in the 178th, 179th, 180th and 181st New York State Legislatures. In the evening of July 17, 1969, he tried to assist two policemen and got stabbed in the back twice by members of a youth gang. He resigned his seat in March 1976, and was appointed to the New York City Criminal Court.

In November 1982, he was elected to the New York Supreme Court (2nd D.).

He died on June 29, 2009.

New York State Senate
| Preceded by Simon J. Liebowitz | New York State Senate; 15th District; 1969–1972 | Succeeded by Martin J. Knorr |
| Preceded by Donald Halperin | New York State Senate; 16th District; 1973–1976 | Succeeded by Howard E. Babbush |
