= Edward J. Coughlin =

American civil engineer and politician

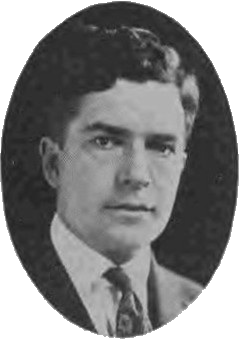
Coughlin in 1923

Edward Joseph Coughlin (July 25, 1885 – October 10, 1945) was an American civil engineer and politician from New York.

== Life ==
Coughlin was born in Valley Falls, New York. He attended the public schools and St. Patrick's Academy in Troy, Albany Business College, the City College of New York, and Heffley Institute in Brooklyn. Coughlin then worked as an assistant civil engineer. During World War I, he served with the American Expeditionary Forces in France as a sergeant first class in the 20th Engineers. Coughlin was wounded four times. In 1933, he married Minnie Baumann (February 14, 1892 – April 3, 1975). Coughlin had one daughter.

Coughlin was a member of the New York State Assembly (Kings Co., 11th D.) in 1923, 1924, 1925, 1926, 1927, 1928, 1929, 1930, 1931, 1932, 1933 and 1934. On April 14, 1930, he was hurt in an airplane wreck in Albany.

He was a member of the New York State Senate (6th D.) from 1935 to 1944, sitting in the 158th, 159th, 160th, 161st, 162nd, 163rd and 164th New York State Legislatures. On February 21, 1941, he was badly injured when he fell down a stairway and crashed through a glass door.

He died on October 10, 1945 from heart disease, in Veterans Hospital in the Bronx; and was buried at the Cypress Hills National Cemetery in Brooklyn.

== Sources ==
New York State Assembly
Preceded by James F. Bly	New York State Assembly; Kings County, 11th District; 1923–1934	Succeeded by Bernard J. Moran
New York State Senate
Preceded by Marcellus H. Evans	New York State Senate; 6th District; 1935–1944	Succeeded by John V. Downey
