= John V. Downey =

American politician

John Valentine Downey (February 14, 1895 – March 1, 1960) was an American lawyer and politician from New York.

== Life ==
He was born on Valentine's Day, February 14, 1895, in Millerton, Dutchess County, New York, the son of Patrick Downey and Catherine (Shanahan) Downey. He attended the public schools in Millerton. During World War I he served in the U.S. Army.

He graduated from Fordham Law School, practiced law in New York City, and lived in Jackson Heights, Queens. He married Willilena Burns, and they had four children.

Downey was a member of the New York State Assembly (Queens Co., 3rd D.) in 1937, 1938, 1939–40, 1941–42 and 1943. He resigned his seat on August 19, 1943, to run for the State Senate seat vacated by the resignation of Peter T. Farrell.

Downey was elected on November 2, 1943, to the New York State Senate (3rd D.), and took his seat in the 164th New York State Legislature in January 1944. He was re-elected in 1944, and remained in the Senate until 1946, sitting in the 165th New York State Legislature. In 1946, he ran for re-election, but was defeated by Republican Charles T. Corey.

He was a member of the Queens Tax Commission from 1948 to 1951. In December 1951, he was appointed to the New York City Municipal Court, to fill a vacancy. In November 1952, he ran to succeed himself, but was defeated and left the bench at the end of the year.

He died on March 1, 1960, in Boulevard Hospital in Astoria, Queens.

== Sources ==
New York State Assembly
Preceded by Peter T. Farrell	New York State Assembly; Queens County, 3rd District; 1937–1943	Succeeded by Maurice Adda
New York State Senate
Preceded by Peter T. Farrell	New York State Senate; 3rd District; 1944	Succeeded by William S. Hults Jr.
Preceded by Edward J. Coughlin	New York State Senate; 6th District; 1945–1946	Succeeded by Charles T. Corey
