= Jeremiah J. Moriarty =

American lawyer and politician

Jeremiah John Moriarty (July 5, 1914 – December 2, 1995) was an American lawyer and politician from New York.

== Life ==
He was born on July 5, 1914, in Buffalo, New York, the son of Jeremiah Moriarty (born 1885) and Bridget (Foley) Moriarty (born 1887). He attended Lafayette High School. He graduated B.A. from Canisius College in 1936, and LL.B. from University of Buffalo Law School in 1939. In 1942, he married Helen Marie Rott (1922–2008), and they had five children. During World War II he served in the U.S. Navy, attaining the rank of lieutenant commander. After the war he practiced law in Franklinville.

Moriarty was a member of the New York State Assembly (Cattaraugus Co.) in 1961 and 1962; and a member of the New York State Senate from 1963 to 1965, sitting in the 174th and 175th New York State Legislatures. He was a delegate to the New York State Constitutional Convention of 1967. In 1974, he was appointed to the New York Court of Claims, and remained on the bench until the end of 1984 when he reached the constitutional age limit.

He died on December 2, 1995; and was buried at the Mount Prospect Cemetery in Franklinville.

== Sources ==
New York State Assembly
Preceded by Leo P. Noonan	New York State Assembly; Cattaraugus County; 1961–1962	Succeeded by James F. Hastings
New York State Senate
Preceded by George H. Pierce	New York State Senate; 58th District; 1963–1965	Succeeded by Frank E. Van Lare
