= Herbert I. Sorin =

American lawyer and politician (1900–1994)

Member of the New York State Senate
- In office 1949–1959
- Preceded by: Kenneth Sherbell
- Succeeded by: Simon J. Liebowitz

Personal details
- Born: August 1, 1900 New York City, U.S.
- Died: August 26, 1994 (aged 94) U.S.
- Resting place: Mount Judah Cemetery, Ridgewood, Queens
- Party: Democratic
- Education: New York University School of Commerce (B.C.S.); New York University School of Law (LL.B.)
- Occupation: Lawyer, politician

Herbert I. Sorin (August 1, 1900 – August 26, 1994) was an American lawyer and politician from New York.

== Life ==
He was born on August 1, 1900, in New York City, the son of Herbert Sorin (died 1930) and Rae Goldberg Sorin (1882–1966). He attended Public School No. 149 and Brooklyn Commercial High School. He graduated B.C.S. from New York University School of Commerce; and LL.B. from New York University School of Law. He was an Assistant U.S. Attorney for the Eastern District of New York for nine years.

Sorin was a member of the New York State Senate (10th D.) from 1949 to 1959, sitting in the 167th, 168th, 169th, 170th, 171st and 172nd New York State Legislatures. On September 18, 1959, he was appointed as a City Magistrate; and in 1962 became a Judge of the New York City Criminal Court.

He died on August 26, 1994; and was buried at the Mount Judah Cemetery in Ridgewood, Queens.

New York State Senate
Preceded by Kenneth Sherbell	New York State Senate; 10th District; 1949–1959	Succeeded by Simon J. Liebowitz
