= Richard A. DiCostanzo =

American politician

Richard Albert DiCostanzo (born January 10, 1908) was an American lawyer and politician from New York.

== Life ==
He was born on January 10, 1908, in Manhattan, the son of Angelo DiCostanzo and Modestina (Ferrante) DiCostanzo. He graduated from DeWitt Clinton High School in 1926; B.S. from New York University College of Arts and Science in 1929; and J.D. from New York University School of Law.

DiCostanzo was a member of the New York State Senate from 1943 to 1946, sitting in the 164th and 165th New York State Legislatures.

== Sources ==
New York State Senate
Preceded by Charles Muzzicato	New York State Senate; 18th District; 1943–1944	Succeeded by Elmer F. Quinn
Preceded by Carl Pack	New York State Senate; 22nd District; 1945–1946	Succeeded by Alfred E. Santangelo
