= Charles D. Perry =

American politician

Charles Dennis Perry (March 12, 1907 – September 18, 1964) was an American politician from New York.

== Life ==
He was born in 1907, the son of Henry Charles Perry (1882–1941) who was Chief Clerk of the New York City Court. Harry Perry was a half-brother of Congressman Christopher D. Sullivan (1870–1942).

Charles D Perry was a member of the New York State Senate (19th D.) from 1939 to 1944, sitting in the 162nd, 163rd and 164th New York State Legislatures.

He was Secretary to New York City Commissioner of Water Supply, Gas and Electricity Armand D'Angelo from 1957 to 1959, and Executive Assistant to the Commissioner from January 1959 until his death in 1964.

He died in September 1964.

== Sources ==
New York State Senate
Preceded by Duncan T. O'Brien	New York State Senate; 19th District; 1939–1944	Succeeded by Francis J. Mahoney
