= Perley A. Pitcher =

American politician

Perley A. Pitcher (January 27, 1877 in Pamelia, Jefferson County, New York – February 20, 1939 in Albany, New York) was an American lawyer and politician from New York. He was Temporary President of the New York State Senate in 1939.

== Life ==
He was the son of John P. Pitcher and Mary Olive Delia (Root) Pitcher. He graduated from Watertown High School. He studied law in Watertown in the offices of Joseph A. McConnell and later graduated from Albany Law School. He was admitted to the bar in 1898. He married Louella Northup Cox (1876–1947).

He was a member of the New York State Senate (37th D.) from 1925 until his death in 1939, sitting in the 148th, 149th, 150th, 151st, 152nd, 153rd, 154th, 155th, 156th, 157th, 158th, 159th, 160th, 161st and 162nd New York State Legislatures. He was the Republican Floor Leader at the New York State Constitutional Convention of 1938 and was elected Temporary President of the State Senate at the beginning of the session, in 1939.

Less than two months into the legislative session, he died in his hotel room in Albany, New York. He was buried at the North Watertown Cemetery in Watertown.

== Sources ==
- Obituary in New York Times on February 21, 1939 (subscription required)
- The Pitcher Book:A Genealogical History of the Descendants of Andrew Pitcher and Margaret Russell Who Settled in Milton, Massachusetts, 1634-2007 by William Richard Phipps (pages 301f; Heritage Books, 2007, ISBN 0-7884-4482-4, ISBN 978-0-7884-4482-1 ) (stating wrong birthplace and dying place)

New York State Senate
Preceded by Willard S. Augsbury	New York State Senate; 37th District; 1925–1939	Succeeded by Isaac B. Mitchell
Political offices
Preceded by George R. Fearon	Minority Leader in the New York State Senate; 1937–1938	Succeeded by John J. Dunnigan
Preceded by John J. Dunnigan	Temporary President of the New York State Senate; 1939	Succeeded by Joe R. Hanley
