= Karl K. Bechtold =

American lawyer and politician

Karl Kondolf Bechtold (July 9, 1910 – June 13, 1970) was an American lawyer and politician from New York.

== Early life and education ==
Bechtold was born on July 9, 1910, in Rochester, New York, the son of Charles B. Bechtold and Kate (Kondolf) Bechtold. He attended Choate School. He graduated B.A. from Yale University in 1933, and LL.B. from Yale Law School in 1937.

== Career ==
Bechtold was a member of the New York State Senate (46th D.) from 1939 to 1942, sitting in the 162nd and 163rd New York State Legislatures.

In 1942, Bechtold joined the U.S. Navy and eventually became a lieutenant commander.

== Personal life and death ==
On August 29, 1942, he married Catherine (Haight) Fowler (died 1964), daughter of Justice Thomas Griffith Haight (1879–1942), and they had two daughters, Karyl Bechtold and Susan Bechtold. Susan died as an infant, Karyl has two children, Timothy Karl and Catharine Ann and 7 grandchildren.

He died on June 13, 1970, at his home in Kennebunkport, Maine; and was buried at the Riverside Cemetery in Rochester.

== Sources ==
New York State Senate
Preceded by George F. Rogers	New York State Senate; 46th District; 1939–1942	Succeeded by Allen J. Oliver
