= William Kirnan =

American politician (1880–1948)

Member of New York State Assembly for New York's 7th district
- In office 1931–1941
- Preceded by: John J. Howard
- Succeeded by: John F. Furey

Member of New York State Senate for New York's 5th district
- In office 1941–1944
- Preceded by: John J. Howard
- Succeeded by: Frederic E. Hammer

Member of New York State Senate for New York's 13th district
- In office 1945–1946
- Preceded by: Francis J. Mahoney
- Succeeded by: C. Corey Mills

Personal details
- Born: January 4, 1880 Brooklyn, New York, United States
- Died: January 30, 1948 (aged 68) Brooklyn, New York, United States

William Kirnan (January 4, 1880 – January 30, 1948) was an American politician from New York.

== Life ==
He was born on January 4, 1880, in Brooklyn. He attended Holy Name Parochial School. During the Spanish–American War he served in the U.S. Army.

Kirnan was a member of the New York State Assembly (Kings Co., 7th D.) in 1931, 1932, 1933, 1934, 1935, 1936, 1937, 1938, 1939–40 and 1941. He resigned his seat on January 31, 1941, to run for the State Senate seat vacated by the death of John J. Howard.

Kirnan was elected on March 11, 1941, to the New York State Senate, and remained in the Senate until 1946, sitting in the 163rd, 164th (both 5th D.) and 165th New York State Legislatures (13th D.).

He died on January 30, 1948, at his home at 516 Seventeenth Street in Brooklyn.

== Sources ==
New York State Assembly
Preceded by John J. Howard	New York State Assembly; Kings County, 7th District; 1931–1941	Succeeded by John F. Furey
New York State Senate
Preceded by John J. Howard	New York State Senate; 5th District; 1941–1944	Succeeded by Frederic E. Hammer
Preceded by Francis J. Mahoney	New York State Senate; 13th District; 1945–1946	Succeeded by C. Corey Mills
