= William C. Thompson (New York judge) =

American politician

William Colridge Thompson Sr. (October 26, 1924 – December 24, 2018) was a New York State Senator and justice of the New York Supreme Court, Appellate Division.

== Biography ==
He was born on October 26, 1924, in New York City. He graduated from Brooklyn College, and in 1954 from Brooklyn Law School. Thompson served in the United States Army during World War II.

He was a member of the New York State Senate from 1965 to 1968, sitting in the 175th, 176th and 177th New York State Legislatures. He was a Democrat. He was Brooklyn's first African-American State Senator.

He was a member of the New York City Council from 1969 to 1973. In November 1973, he was elected to the New York Supreme Court.

In November 1974 he was designated as an associate justice of the Appellate Term, 2nd and 11th Districts. In December 1980, he was designated an associate justice of the Appellate Division, Second Department. He retired from the bench at the end of 2000 when he reached the constitutional age limit, and then became of counsel to the law firm of Roger Victor Archibald, PLLC.

Thompson died on December 24, 2018, at the age of 94. New York City Comptroller Bill Thompson (born 1953) was his son.

New York State Senate
Preceded by Walter E. Cooke	New York State Senate; 11th District; 1965	Succeeded by Jack E. Bronston
Preceded by John J. Marchi	New York State Senate; 19th District; 1966	Succeeded by Samuel L. Greenberg
Preceded by Simon J. Liebowitz	New York State Senate; 18th District; 1967–1968	Succeeded by Waldaba Stewart
