= Allen J. Oliver =

American politician

Allen James Oliver (May 18, 1903 – July 9, 1953) was an American politician from New York.

== Life ==
He was born on May 18, 1903, in Rochester, New York. He was a tax consultant and CPA.

Oliver was a member of the New York State Senate, from 1943 to 1948, sitting in the 164th, 165th and 166th New York State Legislatures. In November 1948, he ran for re-election, but was defeated by Democrat Ray. B. Tuttle.

He died on July 9, 1953, in Rochester, New York, of a heart attack; and was buried at the Riverside Cemetery there.

== Sources ==
New York State Senate
Preceded by Karl K. Bechtold	New York State Senate; 46th District; 1943–1944	Succeeded by Chauncey B. Hammond
Preceded by George H. Pierce	New York State Senate; 51st District; 1945–1948	Succeeded by Ray B. Tuttle
