= Walter G. McGahan =

American lawyer and politician

Walter G. McGahan (August 21, 1902 – January 17, 1981) was an American lawyer and politician from New York.

== Life ==
He was born on August 21, 1902, in Greenwich Village, New York City. He attended St. James Academy and Brooklyn Preparatory School. He graduated from Fordham Law School in 1926, and practiced law in New York City. He married Edna Salisbury, and they had one daughter.

McGahan was a member of the New York City Council from 1947 to 1954.

He was a member of the New York State Senate from 1955 to 1958, sitting in the 170th and 171st New York State Legislatures. In November 1957, he ran on the Republican ticket for New York City Comptroller, but was defeated by the incumbent Democrat Lawrence E. Gerosa. In November 1958, McGahan ran for re-election to the State Senate, but was defeated by Democrat Jack E. Bronston.

He was Deputy State Superintendent of Insurance from May 1959 to October 1967.

He died on January 17, 1981, at his home in Bayside, Queens.

== Sources ==
New York State Senate
Preceded by Milton Koerner	New York State Senate; 5th District; 1955–1958	Succeeded by Jack E. Bronston
