= Jack E. Bronston =

American politician

Member of the New York State Senate
- In office January 1, 1959 – December 31, 1978
- Preceded by: Walter G. McGahan
- Succeeded by: Gary Ackerman
- Constituency: 5th district (1957-1965); 11th district (1966); 9th district (1967-1972); 12th district (1973-1978)

Personal details
- Born: January 10, 1922 Plainfield, New Jersey, U.S.
- Died: December 7, 2017 (aged 95)
- Party: Democratic

Jack E. Bronston (January 10, 1922 – December 7, 2017) was an American lawyer and politician from New York.

== Life ==
He was born in Plainfield, New Jersey, the son of Harry E. Bronston (1892–1972). He attended Plainfield High School and graduated A.B. from Harvard College in 1942. During World War II he served in the U.S. Marine Corps. He graduated from Harvard Law School in 1948, and received an LL.M. in taxation from New York University School of Law. He was admitted to the bar in 1949, and practiced in New York City. He married Adele Schwartz.

He entered politics as a Democrat, and was a member of the New York State Senate from 1959 to 1978, sitting in the 172nd, 173rd, 174th, 175th, 176th, 177th, 178th, 179th, 180th, 181st and 182nd New York State Legislatures. He remarried to Sandra Krasne in 1979.

On January 2, 1981, he was sentenced by Milton Pollack, of the U.S. District Court for the Southern District of New York, to four months in prison for fraud. Bronston had helped one company to get a contract for New York City bus shelters while having been retained by, and thus legally representing, a competing company. On August 19, 1981, the conviction was upheld by the United States Court of Appeals for the Second Circuit.

On June 18, 1981, Bronston's license to practice law was suspended by the New York Supreme Court, Appellate Division effective July 17. On March 5, 1985, the suspension was declared as terminated, effectively from September 17, 1984.

== Sources ==
New York State Senate
Preceded by Walter G. McGahan	New York State Senate; 5th District; 1959–1965	Succeeded by Edward J. Speno
Preceded by William C. Thomson	New York State Senate; 11th District; 1966	Succeeded by Irving Mosberg
Preceded by Murray Schwartz	New York State Senate; 9th District; 1967–1972	Succeeded by Karen Burstein
Preceded by Martin J. Knorr	New York State Senate; 12th District; 1973–1978	Succeeded by Gary Ackerman
