= Elmer F. Quinn =

American lawyer and politician

Elmer Francis Quinn (June 16, 1895 – September 2, 1952) was an American lawyer and politician from New York.

== Life ==
He was born in Manhattan, New York City, on June 16, 1895, and attended Grove Street Grammar School No.3 and Townsend Harris High school. He graduated from City College of New York and Fordham University School of Law. He practiced law in New York City, and for some time was confidential secretary to George W. Olvany.

On January 7, 1926, Quinn was elected to the New York State Senate to fill the vacancy caused by the resignation of Jimmy Walker who had been elected Mayor of New York City. Quinn remained in the State Senate until his death in 1952, serving in the 149th through the 168th New York State Legislatures. He was Minority Leader in the State Senate from 1945 to 1952.

He died on September 2, 1952, at St. Luke's Hospital in Manhattan, New York City.

New York State Senate
Preceded by Jimmy Walker	New York State Senate; 12th District; 1926–1944	Succeeded by Samuel L. Greenberg
Preceded by Richard A. DiCostanzo	New York State Senate; 18th District; 1945–1952	Succeeded by Joseph R. Marro
Political offices
Preceded by John J. Dunnigan	Minority Leader in the New York State Senate; 1945–1952	Succeeded by Francis J. Mahoney
