= Richard Mohun =

American explorer and diplomat, born 1864

Richard D Mohun
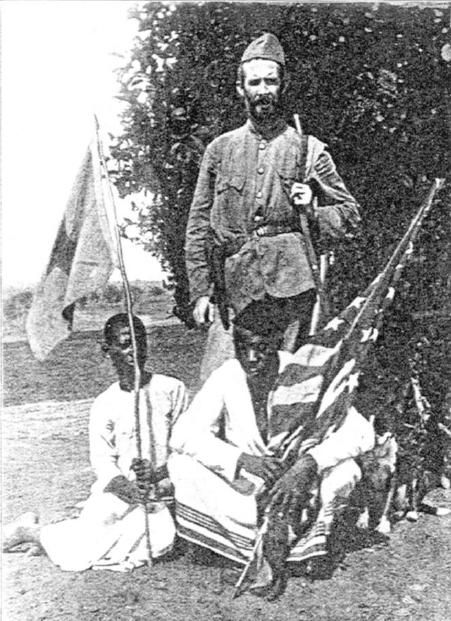
- Mohun in the Congo c.1895. Seated at right is Sergeant Omari bo Hamise.
- Born: April 12, 1864; Washington, D.C., U.S.
- Died: July 13, 1915 (aged 51); Royal Oak, Maryland, U.S.
- Occupations: Explorer and soldier of fortune

Richard Dorsey Loraine Mohun (April 12, 1864 – July 13, 1915) was an American explorer, diplomat, mineral prospector and mercenary. Mohun worked for the United States government as a commercial agent in Angola and the Congo Free State. During his time as commercial agent, he volunteered to command a unit of Belgian artillery in a campaign to force Arab slavers from the colony.

Mohun remained in the service of the US government during this time and was subsequently posted as consul to Zanzibar. In this capacity, he was called upon to act as an intermediary between the combatants in the Anglo-Zanzibar War. Following the conclusion of his three-year posting, Mohun returned to the Congo to prospect for minerals, and later worked with the Belgian authorities.

His most ambitious undertaking was a three-year expedition, beginning in 1898, that laid a telegraph line from Lake Tanganyika to Stanley Falls. He then spent some time prospecting in South Africa before returning to the Congo to reform the Abir Congo Company on behalf of Leopold II of Belgium.

== Early life ==
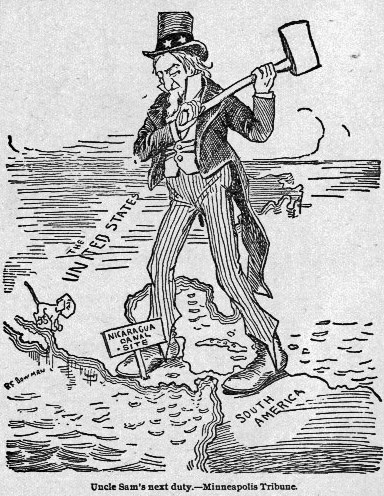
A contemporary cartoon depicting the US-funded Nicaragua canal

Richard Dorsey Mohun was born in Washington, D.C., on April 12, 1864. Mohun's family had a long association with Africa - his grandfather, William McKenny, had been a prominent figure during the colonisation of the continent and built up a comprehensive collection of photographs during his time there. Mohun, who was privately tutored at the family home, is known to have seen these photographs whilst growing up. Mohun developed an interest in the slave trade, which continued under Arab control in Eastern and Southern Africa, and became the fourth member of his family to campaign for its eradication. Mohun's sister, Lee intended to train as a nun to join a Catholic mission in the Congo, where the slavers were active, and was only dissuaded by her family who asked her to minister to African-Americans in Washington instead.

Mohun received a commission in the Pay Corps of the United States Navy in 1881 and served on a four-year cruise in the Mediterranean. His grandmother, religious writer Anna Hanson Dorsey, arranged for him to meet her acquaintance, Denis J. O'Connell, at the Pontifical North American College in Rome in 1885. Mohun was appointed Assistant Paymaster in 1885 and served with the United States Department of the Navy upon his return from the cruise. He was promoted to the rank of lieutenant in 1889, the same year he resigned his navy commission to join the United States Department of State.

Mohun and his brother, Louis, were involved in the short-lived Nicaragua Canal Construction Company, a private American enterprise seeking link the Pacific and Atlantic oceans. Louis had been on survey expeditions with the company since 1888 and construction works began at Corinto in 1890. Richard secured a position as an auditor with the company's transportation division by 1891 but the project was hit by tropical disease and the Mohuns returned home to Washington by January 1892.

== United States agent in the Congo ==
On surviving the Congolese climate

Wear woolen undershirts and flannel overshirts; always to have a good thick coat ready to put on while on the march .. to keep from catching cold; keep out of all draughts. Eat wholesome food with very little fat to it, accompanied by a glass of good Bordeaux or Vino Tinto ... Keep regular hours; take quinine and iron when you feel run down; do not allow yourself to become constipated ... If you wish to drink spirits, do so in the evening, but not to excess, and then take only the very best you can find.

— Richard Mohun, quoted in Jampoler 2013, p. 17

The well-connected Anna Hanson Dorsey was close friends with the mother of the American Secretary of State James Blaine and Blaine and Dorsey shared ties with Notre Dame University. Dorsey was able to use this influence to arrange the appointment of Mohun as US commercial agent to the Congo Free State on 22 January 1892, filling a vacancy caused by the death-in-post of US Navy Lieutenant Emory Taunt the previous year. The US had maintained an agent in the Congo ever since it had been formally recognised and the commercial agent also acted as the nation's diplomatic representative to the Free State. The post came with a $5,000 annual budget and a remit to investigate the commercial potential of Congo and to promote trade between the two countries, which previously had been almost non-existent. Mohun was appointed ahead of the missionary Samuel Norvell Lapsley who had been championed by a state senator from Alabama.

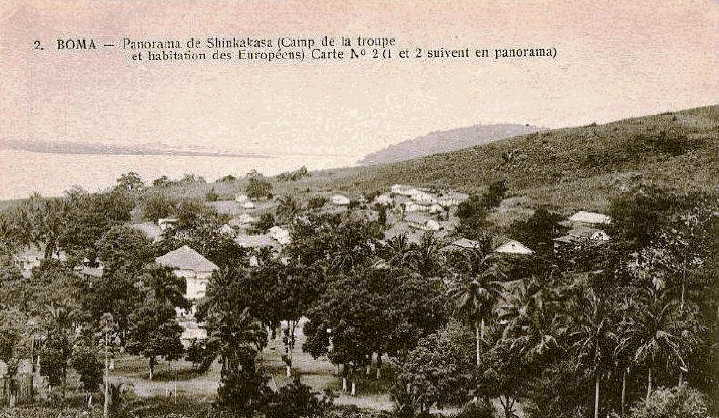
Boma, c. 1900

Mohun left America for Genoa, Italy with Louis and their sister, Laura. The three travelled in Europe for 2–3 months before Mohun reported to Brussels to meet with King Leopold II who, in spite of his callous reputation, impressed him with his apparent ambition to bring peace and western civilization to the Congo. Mohun then journeyed to the Congo with Louis, who was to act as his sub-agent. The US commercial post in the Free State was then at Boma near the Atlantic coast, but Mohun also operated from Léopoldville, further inland. In July 1892 he assisted US citizen Warren C. Unckless in establishing a rubber factory on the Sankuru River near Lusambo for the Société anonyme belge pour le commerce du Haut-Congo. Unckless, a plantation manager in Costa Rica, had imported experienced rubber cutters from South America to begin the enterprise but came under attack from tribesmen and a Belgian force had to be dispatched to provide security. Mohun spent much of his time in exploration of the country's interior, visiting several areas where no white man had ever ventured and making a survey of the quality of the agricultural land and the crops grown by the native population.

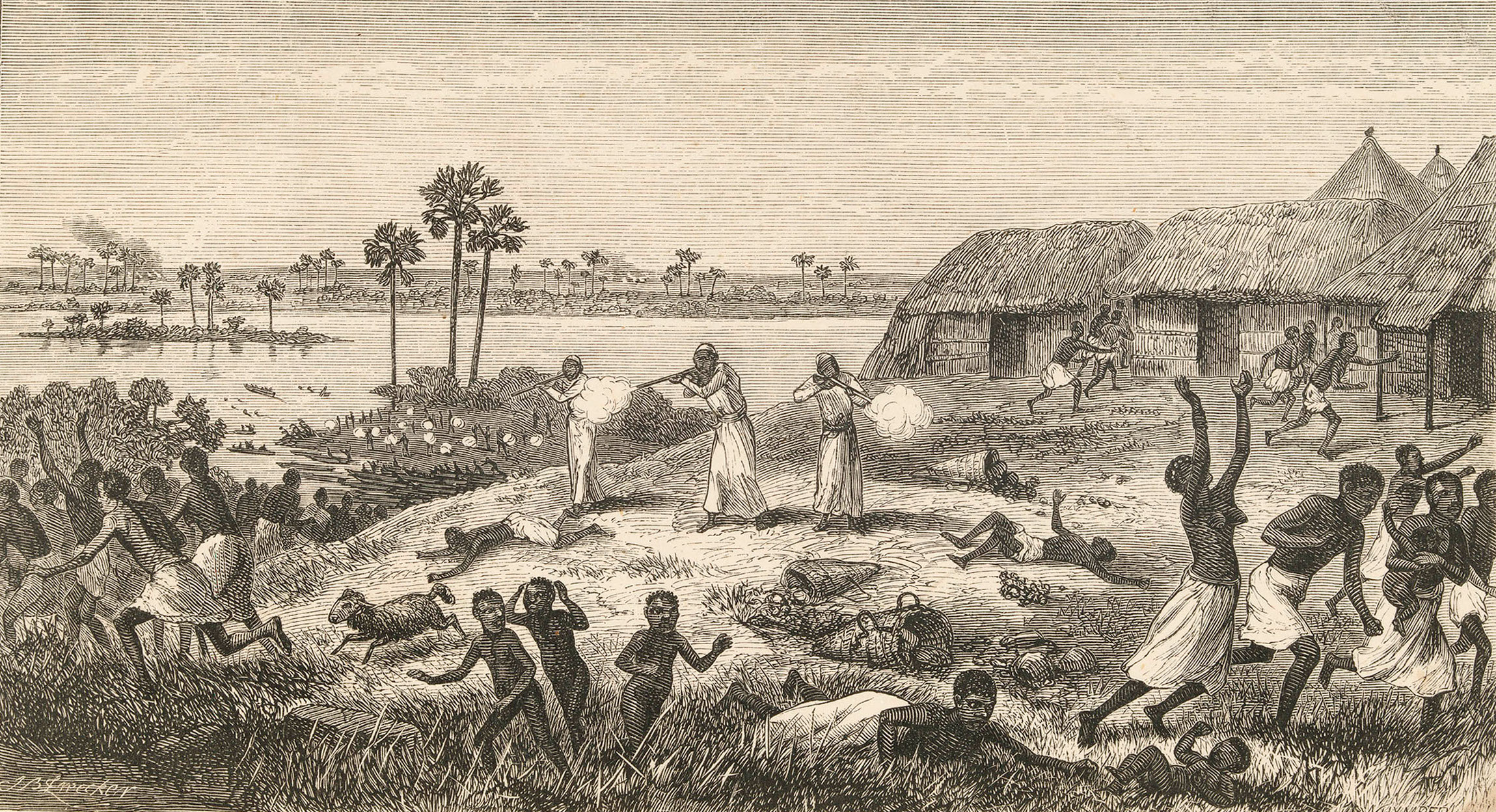
An Arab slaver attack on a Congolese village

Mohun frequently came into conflict with the native tribesmen. When his mail bag and personal papers were stolen and a local chief refused to return them he proceeded to wage war on the chief accompanied by four gunmen and a steamboat. Mohun attacked and burnt at least ten villages before he captured the chief's son whom he threatened to hang. In return for his son's life the chief returned the mail bag, alongside a second that Mohun had not noticed was missing. Another time, seeking to view the native method of making cloth, he visited a remote town accompanied by only six followers covertly armed with revolvers. The party came under attack by spears and poisoned arrows. Having fought off their assailants Mohun captured the town and "burned it to the ground to teach them a lesson". Mohun was always conscious of his public image and wrote a diary with a view to later publication. Mohun's diary contains little in the way of self-criticism and he reflects upon his responsibility for this incident by stating that he was "satisfied in my own conscience that I had rid the country of a brute and unnecessary member of society." On another occasion he witnessed the funeral of a local chief who had four of his wives and 10 slaves buried alive with him. Mohun was unable to intervene, in spite of his horror at the situation, as he had only a small escort and was heavily outnumbered.

Mohun, who came under attack five or six times within six months, blamed much of the violence on Arab slavers who Mohun claimed had directed the killing of all of the white men in the east of the country and allowed their bodies to be eaten by cannibals. The slavers, who originated from the East coast of Africa, were in conflict with the heavily outnumbered Belgian authorities in the Congo Arab War. Francis, Baron Dhanis, vice-governor general to the Free State, had been leading an expedition against slavers - who were led by Sefu, the son of Tippu Tip - since July 1892.

== Chaltin Expedition ==
The steamer Bruxelles in the Congo, 1890

In 1893 Mohun was appointed commander of the artillery attached to a Belgian expedition, commanded by Louis Napoléon Chaltin, sent against the slavers led by Rumaliza. Mohun had risen to the position owing to the illness of the original Chief of Artillery, a Belgian Army officer, and joined the expedition via the steamer Bruxelles sometime after it had started off from Basoko. Just prior to his joining the expedition had destroyed entirely the 1,200-house village of Tchari. Mohun accompanied the expedition to Bena-Kamba where the party suffered an outbreak of smallpox before 555 of the survivors continued on towards Riba Riba. The expedition passed through Ikhamba, entirely deserted except for an array of 16 severed heads left as a warning by the slavers. Around this time Mohun led part of the expedition into a village where he disturbed a cannibal feast, he arrested the village chief who was tried and hanged. On another occasion he was traversing the jungle alone when he came across six armed Arab slavers in a clearing. In the subsequent fight he killed four of the slavers before the remaining two fled.

On March 29 the Chaltin Expedition reached a deep stream and, in searching for a fording place, came across a large group of Arab slavers. The expedition launched a surprise attack on the camp, supported by an artillery piece, and routed them after several hours fighting. The expedition found only one dead body left on the field, though it was supposed that the Arabs had lost more men and carried the bodies away with them in retreat. Mohun was with a force of 150 men sent over the stream to Riba Riba with the intention of reaching the town before the retreating slavers could give warning. Once again they encountered a deserted town, except for two hands nailed to a flagstaff taken from the corpses of two European men killed the week before. Mohun's group burned the town to the ground before returning to the main party of the expedition. The force suffered another outbreak of smallpox and it was decided to send the sick back to the steamer at Bene-Kamba. The main force rested for a number of days before following on. During the three-day march the expedition encountered the bodies of the sick that had died on the return journey and a roll call at Bene-Kamba revealed some 104 men had died in the first two weeks of the expedition.

The expedition proceeded by the steamer to Stanley Falls and split into two detachments. One attacked the slaver's factory and the other their nearby boma under supporting artillery fire from the steamer. Some 75 slavers were killed, including their chief, and a further 100 slaves, soldiers, women and retainers taken prisoner. The slavers, comprehensively defeated, were driven from the country and the war effectively brought to a close. Mohun accompanied a force sent to investigate the slavers town of Romie and discovered it to already be in the hands of Congo State forces. At Romie Mohun encountered several of the Belgian native troops engaging in cannibalism of the dead Arabs. This practice had been outlawed by Chaltin and was punishable by death. Mohun recorded that he fired a single shot which put an end to the matter.

Mohun then marched 500 miles with the expedition to Kasongo, the former home of Tippu Tip, in January 1894. There his force of 1,400 native auxiliaries and porters and 150 soldiers joined with Dhanis' 26,000 men for an assault on the fortified town. In the subsequent fighting the Belgian forces, assisted by artillery, killed 3,000 of the slaver's men, blew up their powder magazines and burnt the town. Still in Kasongo by February Mohun had intended to take a force of some sixty soldiers, 100 porters and 90 others to Tanganyika where he planned to catch a steamer to South Africa to arrange passage to the Congolese coast. From there he planned to settle his affairs, resign his post and return to America. He hoped in the process to intercept a slave caravan that had been fleeing eastwards from the expedition loaded with slaves, ivory and gold.

Instead Mohun, recognised for the leading role he played in many of the engagements, was in March 1894 appointed by Dhanis to be second-in-command of an expedition to determine whether there was a navigable watercourse between Lake Tanganyika and the upper Lualaba River. The expedition encountered difficulties in traversing the terrain and waterways of the country and with hostile natives. Mohun discovered the confluence of the Luabala and Lumbridgi rivers and was able to disprove the existence of Lake Lanchi, which had been marked on many maps at this location. The river itself proved to be highly variable ranging from 2500m to just 90m in width, contained in gorges up to 1,200m deep and with one 110 km stretch proving entirely unnavigable by canoe. Mohun recorded that the soil in the valley was highly fertile, the local Barua people quite numerous and named two new peaks Mount Dhanis and Mount Cleveland.

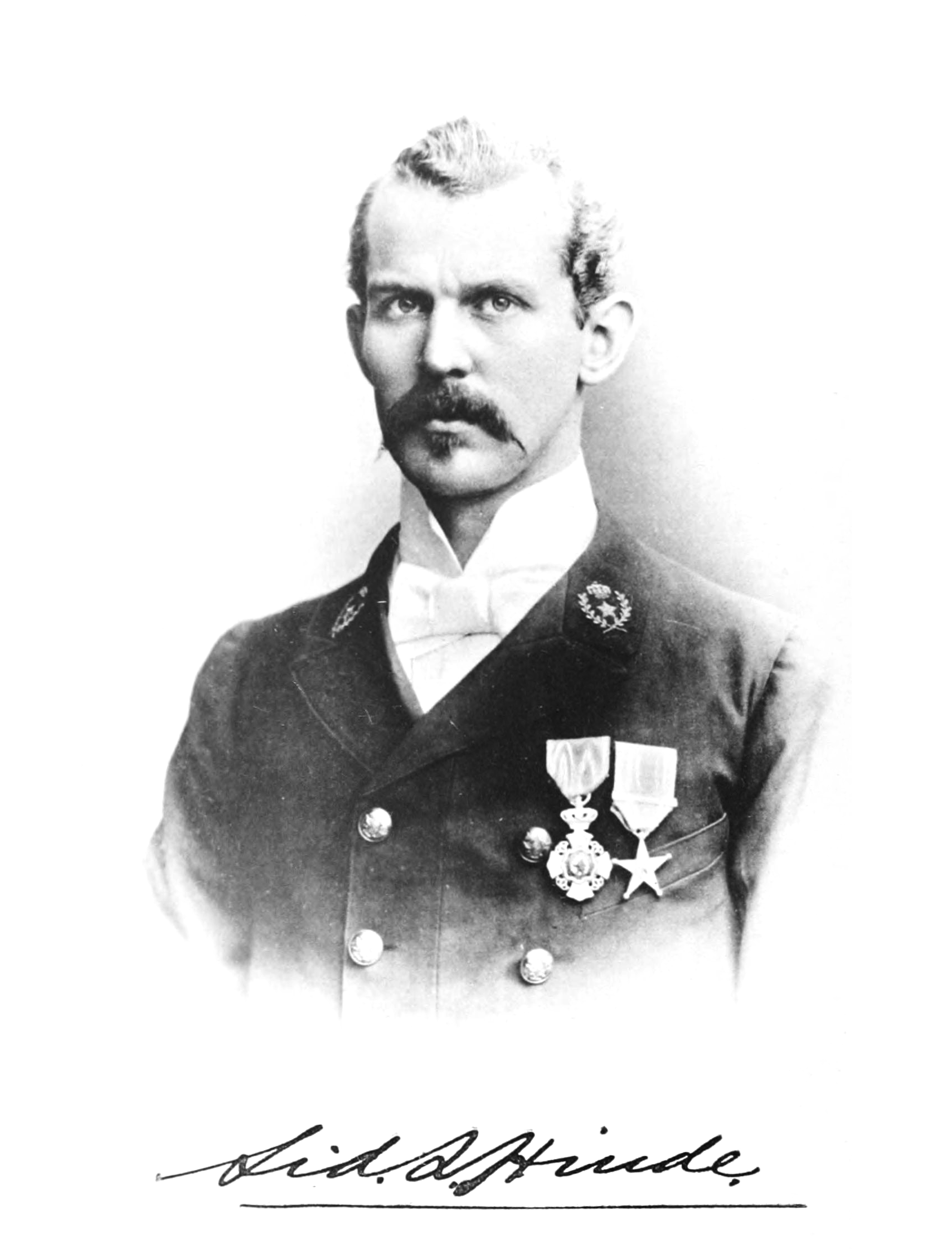
Expedition commander Dr Hinde, depicted in 1897

The expedition reached as far as Mount Buli on the Lukuga River when its commander, Dr Sidney Langford Hinde, fell ill with an abscess on the liver, Mohun assumed command from 11 April and successfully completed the remainder of the task. Mohun delivered Hinde, who was incapable even of sitting upright or eating, through native attacks to Kasongo on 25 April. Hinde's abscess, which could not be treated as there was no other doctor nearer than Basoko, successfully resolved itself by bursting during travel and saved his life.

In April 1894 whilst at Kasongo Mohun's sergeant Omari bo Hamise, who had been Stanley's chief sergeant in the Emin Pasha Relief Expedition, identified two men who had murdered Emin Pasha on the orders of the slaver Kibonge. Mohun questioned the pair, garnered their confessions and sent them for trial after which they were hanged. During his time in the Congo Mohun also took part in big-game hunting killing 20 elephants and 50 leopards within two years.

In this role Mohun was given responsibility for the government of some five million natives and tasked with improving internal markets in the country.

Mohun continued his work to eradicate the slave trade, made several surveying expeditions, established new trade markets, and assisted in the suppression of cannibalism. He estimated that there were 20 million cannibals in the Free State, and spoke of witnessing both a cannibal feast, and the practice of burying people alive. Mohun's work in the Congo has been described as the last "spectacular contribution" by an American in opening up the country. The record he kept of this expedition was used by Belgian author and cartographer AJ Wauters to compose a map of the Lomami River, which was published in 1901.

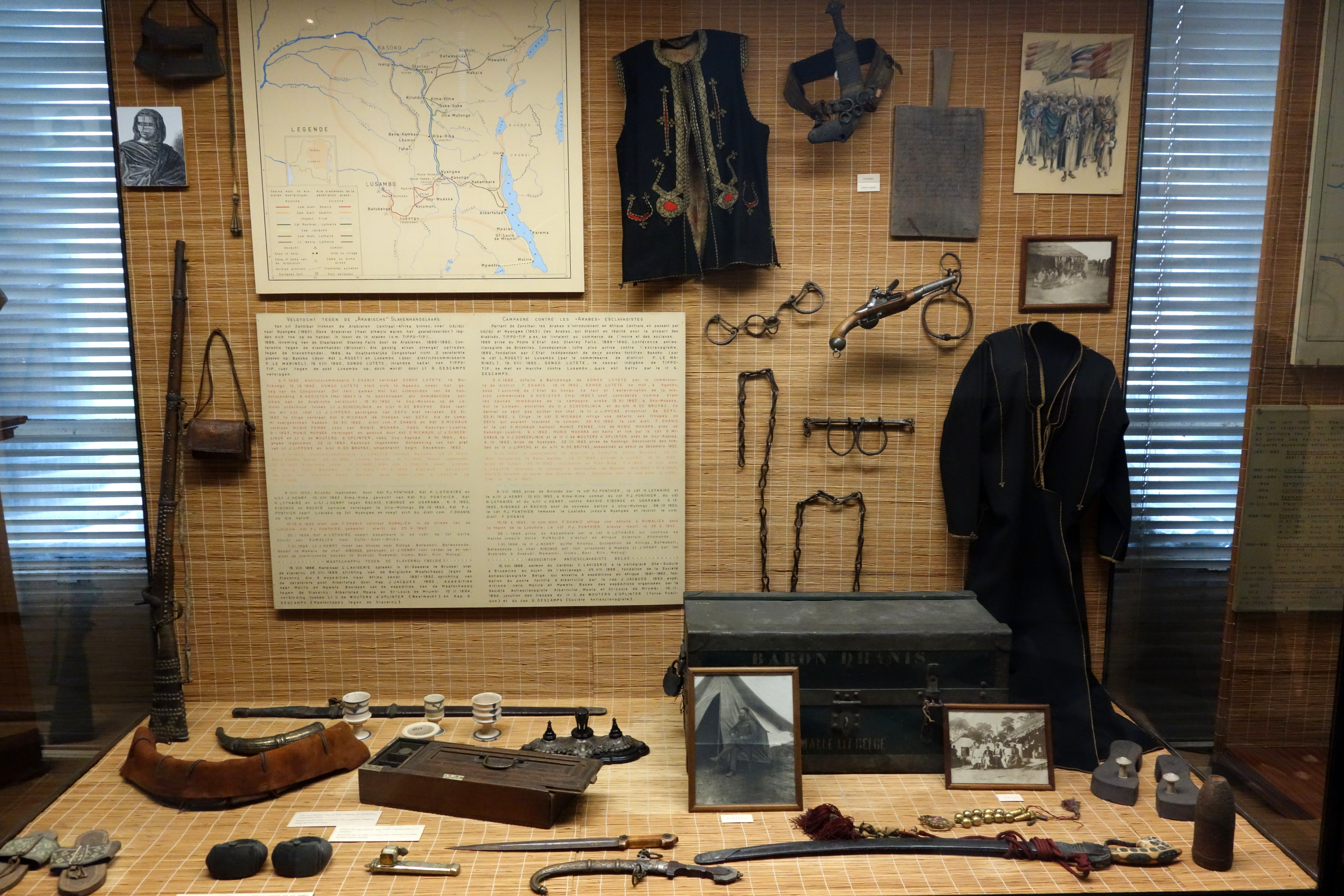
A display of articles from the Congo Arab War

Mohun had remained US commercial agent throughout this time, and insisted on drawing no pay from the Belgian government for his services, though he did receive $5000 from the Société Anonyme Belge pour le commerce du Haut-Congo. Although he never held a commission in the Belgian Army during this, and later expeditions, he would often wear a uniform to maintain discipline amongst his men. Mohun is quoted as saying, of the reason for choosing to assist the Belgian military operations, that "I prefer killing Arabs in the interior to killing time at Boma". In 1894, he was awarded honorary membership of the Société Royale Belge de Géographie (Royal Belgian Geographical Society), and Leopold I appointed him a chevalier of the Royal Order of the Lion for his accomplishments in the slaver war. Mohun also received decorations from the United Kingdom and France for his work in the Congo. Mohun's stated priority in the Congo was to improve conditions for the inhabitants by bringing them within the Belgian sphere of influence. He also claimed that the popular image of Belgian brutality in the region was a lie spread by missionaries—a statement contradicted by evidence of unnecessary cruelty by Belgian troops.

It seems that Mohun later had second thoughts about the removal of the Arab slavers from the Congo and their replacement by pro-Belgian Congolese village chiefs. In the late 1890s he made his views known to Roger Casement, the British-Irish diplomat who was then campaigning for reform in the Congo. Mohun stated "we were all called upon to admire as an achievement of civilisation over barbarism" the removal of the Arab slavers but that "I believe the Arabs when they permanently occupied a country did a very great deal of good, much more than they will ever be given credit for". It was then his, and Casement's, belief that "slavery still exists ... For the native I believe the change has been for the worst as they certainly don't have the same respect for a dirty native chief as they had for the powerful Arab always clean, and even the worst of them with the manners of gentlemen". Mohun also recounts the case of Nyangwe, a town of 3,000 houses and up to 45,000 inhabitants that he encountered, within a year of a Free State army post being established there the town had been completely destroyed. In 1896 he noted that one of the Belgian generals had encouraged the cruelty and that the situation improved after he was recalled by King Leopold.

== Zanzibar ==
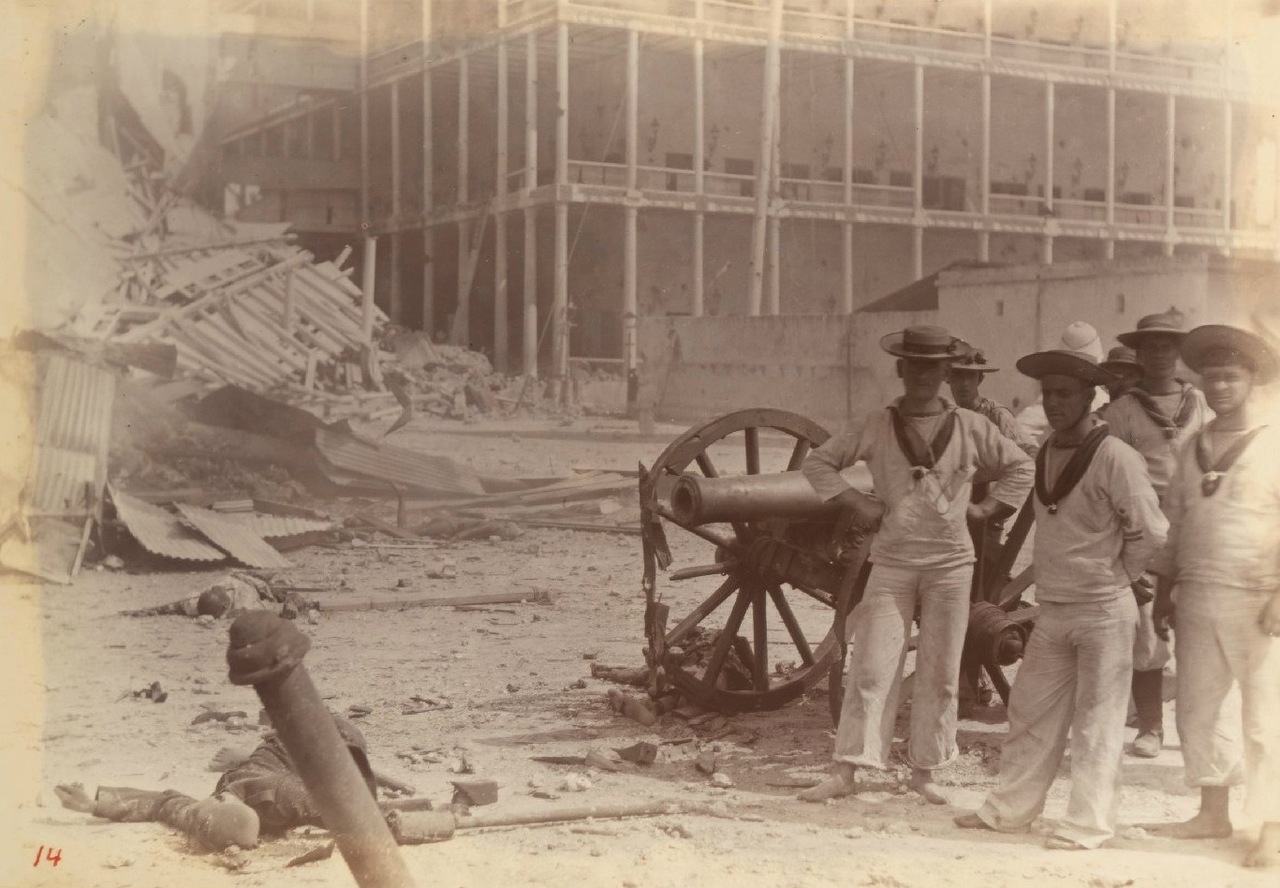
The front cover of Mohun's photographic portfolio of the Anglo-Zanzibar War.

Due to the frequent expeditions Mohun carried out in the Congo, Mohun was unable to spend much time on his duties as commercial agent. The US State Department was, perhaps surprisingly, pleased with Mohun's undiplomatic conduct in assisting the Belgians. This may have been because he did not receive a salary for his work and assisted in making the Congo more commercially stable. Mohun left the Congo and returned to the United States where he married Harriette Louise Barry from New York City and had his Congo report presented to Congress. After a short period of leave Mohun was appointed to be the State Department's Consul to Zanzibar on May 24, 1895. His appointment, which he then held until November 22, 1897, may have been a reward for his work in the Free State. Mohun was not replaced as commercial agent and the office ceased to exist in July 1895 - the next US government appointment to the Free State was not until 1906 when a consul-general was appointed. Mohun arranged a period of five minutes between his resignation as commercial agent and acceptance of the post of consul so that he could accept his Order of the Lion without contravening the US constitutions Title of Nobility Clause that prohibits those holding public office from accepting gifts from foreign powers. Harriette accompanied Mohun to Zanzibar and, on April 18, 1896, gave birth to their first son, Reginald Dorsey Mohun. Casement served as Reginald's godfather and, shortly after his birth, sent him an autographed copy of his "Careless Chicken" fable.

During his time on the island, he became involved in the Anglo-Zanzibar War of 27 August 1896, as an intermediary between the Sultan of Zanzibar and the British authorities. He reported the outcome of the war and the safety of all American subjects to the State Department on the same morning. In return for his services and conduct during the engagement, he was decorated by the new Sultan. During the course of the war Mohun compiled a portfolio of photographs that he later published. After the war Mohun served as a mediator between the Sultan and the British authorities. On 6 July 1897 he informed his superiors of an outbreak of smallpox on the island among the Indian and native population and that an English missionary had been attacked for carrying a victim around in his arms. Mohun was concerned that the outbreak might spread to the white population and noted that vaccination doses had been ordered from Marseilles for the native population.

During his time in Africa Mohun had acquired a leopard cub after killing its mother, who was attacking the livestock of a native village. He named the young male Dijini ("Devil") and raised him in his house. During a visit to Europe Dijini accompanied his master in his carriage. After terrifying the staff and residents of a hotel in Antwerp Mohun was forced to cage the leopard. Despite receiving several bids from menagerie-owners Mohun made a gift of the animal to the Washington Zoo and arranged to have him shipped to his hometown. Mohun returned to Washington six months layer, upon completion of his posting in Zanzibar, and visited his former pet. Mohun amazed staff at the zoo by jumping the railings and passing his hand between the bars of Dijini's enclosure to allow the animal to lick his hand.

== Tanganyika-Nile telegraph expedition ==
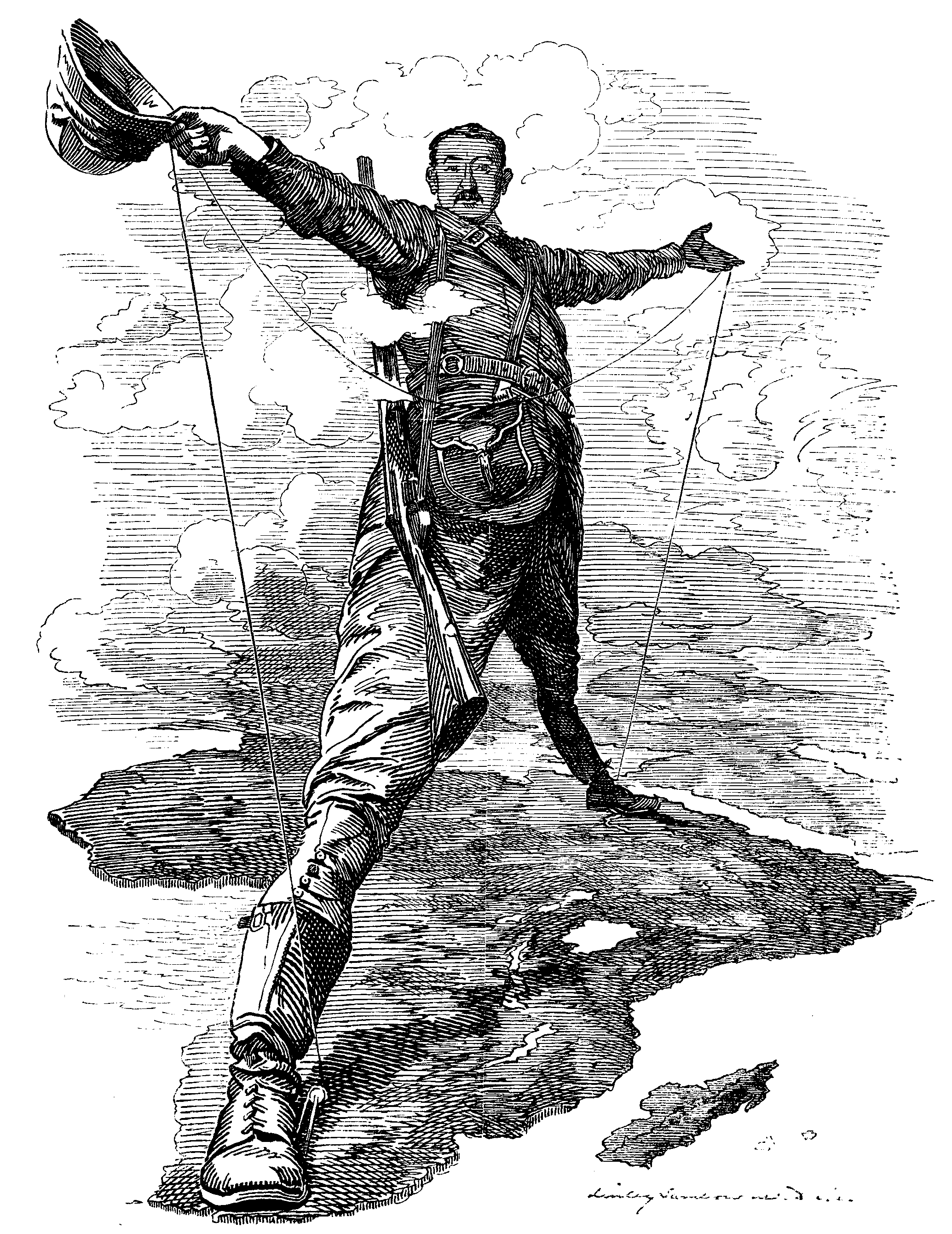
Mohun's expedition may have been intended to form a link in the grand "Cape to Cairo" telegraph earlier proposed by Cecil Rhodes

Mohun's appointment at Zazibar ended in November 1897 and he returned to Belgium with Harriette, purchasing a house in Brussels. Harriette remained at this house during the rest of Mohun's subsequent postings in Africa. Mohun was contacted by the Belgian government, which had been impressed by his work on behalf of the United States, and was appointed a district commissioner (1st class) in their colonial service in June 1898. In July King Leopold commissioned Mohun to lay a telegraph line from Lake Tanganyika to Wadelai on the White Nile. Mohun accepted the position despite, just months before, condemning the region as a "wretched country in the heart of Africa". Mohun left Antwerp, Belgium for Africa at the end of August 1898.

The overhead telegraph may have been intended as a link in the proposed line from the Cape to Cairo, it was to be supported by 7m-high poles at 150m spacings and had been allocated a budget of three million francs. Mohun was allowed free rein to choose his own staff and set out with five electricians/engineers (including some from Britain and France), Dr. Raan Horace Castellote as medical officer and a military escort commanded by Belgian Captain Verhellen. He advertised among the Askari of Zanzibar for volunteers to provide the escort required by the expedition, and received more than one thousand responses. From these, he selected one hundred men to accompany him, twenty of whom had served with him in the Congo expedition of 1894. The work was hoped to have been completed by 1900.

In order to negotiate with the local population along his route, Mohun took "100 boxes [of] trade goods consisting of bells, knives, locks, mirrors, music boxes, watches, clocks, fezzes, and other odds and ends". His diary also notes that spectacles, Arab-made incense and American-made cloth were popular, and that he used the latter to pay his Askari escort. The expedition also included porters to carry the equipment and to lay the telegraph line. In addition to laying the telegraph Mohun was instructed by Dhanis to use his askaris against parties of Batetela mutineers that still plagued the region in the aftermath of the rebellion of 1897-8.

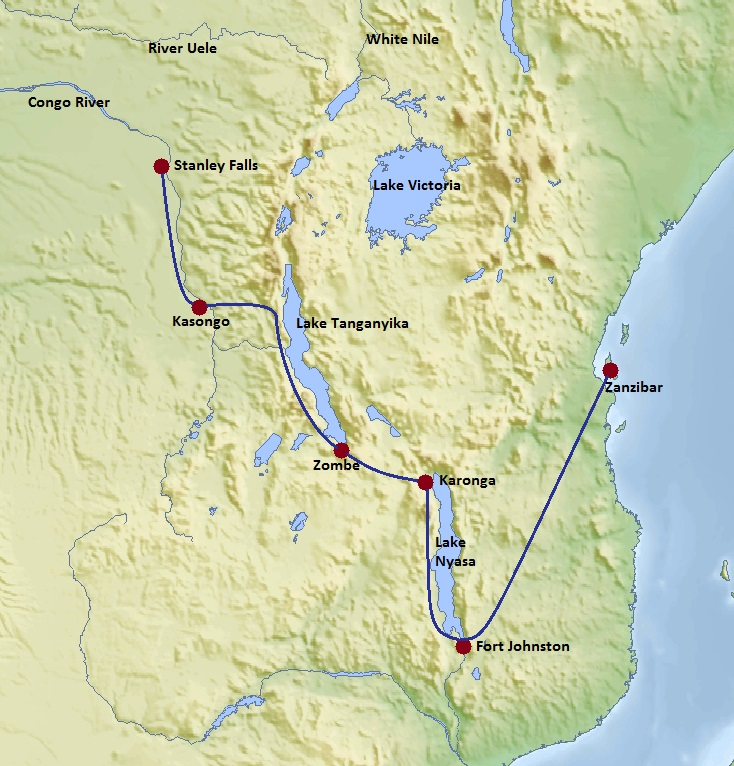
The approximate route taken by the expedition to lay the telegraph line.

A ship named Sir Harry Johnson took them from Zanzibar to the African mainland in the German colony of Tanganyika. The expedition then proceeded to the settlement of Fort Johnston at the southern tip of Lake Nyasa where they replenished their food stocks with fish from the Shire River. Mohun's party then proceeded along the western bank of the lake to the settlement of Karonga in North-Eastern Rhodesia. The expedition probably used the Stevenson Road which connected Karonga to Zombe at the southern tip of Lake Tanganyika. At Longwe the group encountered Ewart Grogan, the British explorer then in the process of completing the first crossing of Africa from south to north. Captain Verhellen drew Grogan's attention to a group of pale Southern Reedbucks. Grogan shot one and sent its pelt to the Zoological Society of London where it was regarded as potentially the first sighting of a new form of the species.

Mohun's group then began laying the telegraph line (starting at Albertville), heading north along the western bank of the Lake and entering the Congo Free State before turning west to meet the River Congo at Kasongo. Shortly after entering the Congo in July 1899 the party, then comprising just ten European men, came under attack by a force of cannibal tribesmen. Mohun estimated that his opponents numbered some 1,500 men and claimed to have inflicted 300 dead and 600 wounded in exchange for 9 men killed and 47 wounded in his party. Mohun was said to have contributed much to the party's defence with his Winchester rifle and was reinforced part way through the engagement by three companies of native infantry sent by Dhanis. The cannibals subsequently fled towards Lake Tanganyika. Castellote died on the expedition on 26 September. In December 1900 Mohun's family contacted the US ambassador to Belgium, Lawrence Townsend, to ask him to investigate rumours of his death which had been announced at a lecture in Washington.

Mohun's party followed the river north to Stanley Falls where, after three years, the expedition completed the line some distance short of the Nile. The telegraph was some 286 miles (460 km) long and enabled the transmission of messages across the African interior for the first time. As a result, Mohun claimed to be known amongst the indigenous peoples along the route as "Big master of the telephone". Mohun, the only white survivor of the expedition, returned to Belgium from the west coast Congo ports and thus completed an east–west traverse of the continent. Mohun claimed to be the first American to achieve the feat, a credit usually given to Henry Morton Stanley for his 1874-77 expedition. Mohun's claim may have been due to knowing Stanley was a naturalised American citizen born in Wales. He is regarded as one of three Americans who played key roles in opening the Belgian Congo to outsiders, alongside Stanley and the missionary William Henry Sheppard.

== After the expedition ==
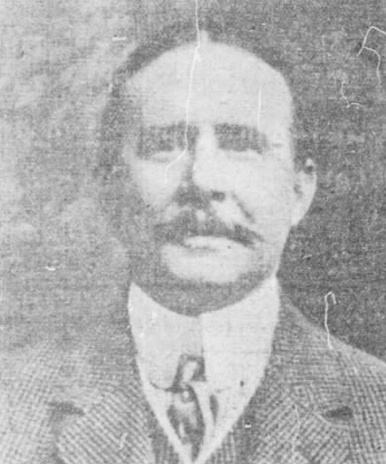
Mohun pictured in 1907

Mohun's contract with the Belgian crown came to an end in October 1901 and he returned to Harriette in Brussels where he acted as an advisor to King Leopold on the management of the Congo. His second son, Cecil Peabody Mohun, who later became a stockbroker, was born in Brussels on March 27, 1904. Not wishing to embark upon another long appointment in Africa, Mohun wrote a request for employment to former US State Department official Thomas W. Cridler, commissioner for the 1904 Louisiana Purchase Exposition. Mohun suggested the inclusion of an anthropological exhibit featuring, in his words,

a few pygmies, from the Congo. Cannibals of course would be amongst the Congo lot, as it would be impossible to bring natives from interior Africa without finding a large percentage of man eaters amongst them ... I am not proposing any dime Museum, or Midway Plaisance sort of show. Make it a part of the Equatorial African Section, an integral part of the Exhibition itself.

Mohun was unsuccessful and never received a formal position with the exposition, though his suggestion might have led to the inclusion of the pygmy Ota Benga and other African tribesmen as part of the exhibition. He is believed to have written to Roger Casement during this time in an attempt to counter the accounts of Belgian abuses in the Congo that Casement was then compiling for publication in his 1905 Casement Report.

In December 1905, on the recommendation of King Leopold, he was appointed director of the Abir Congo Company. The Abir Rubber Company was the only company mentioned by name in a Congo Commission report, which reported: "the imprisonment of women as hostages, flogging to excess, and various acts of brutality are not contested. It is the black spot on the history of Central African settlement." Mohun was appointed to institute reforms addressing these practices. He enjoyed some success in this regard and also devoted much time to an attempt to exterminate the tsetse fly. In 1906 successfully proposed that Leopold II buy out Abir and take the concession under direct control of the crown. He appears to have left Abir around the same time and was, in March 1907, proposed by the Congo Free State government to assume the role of African manager for the American Congo Company.

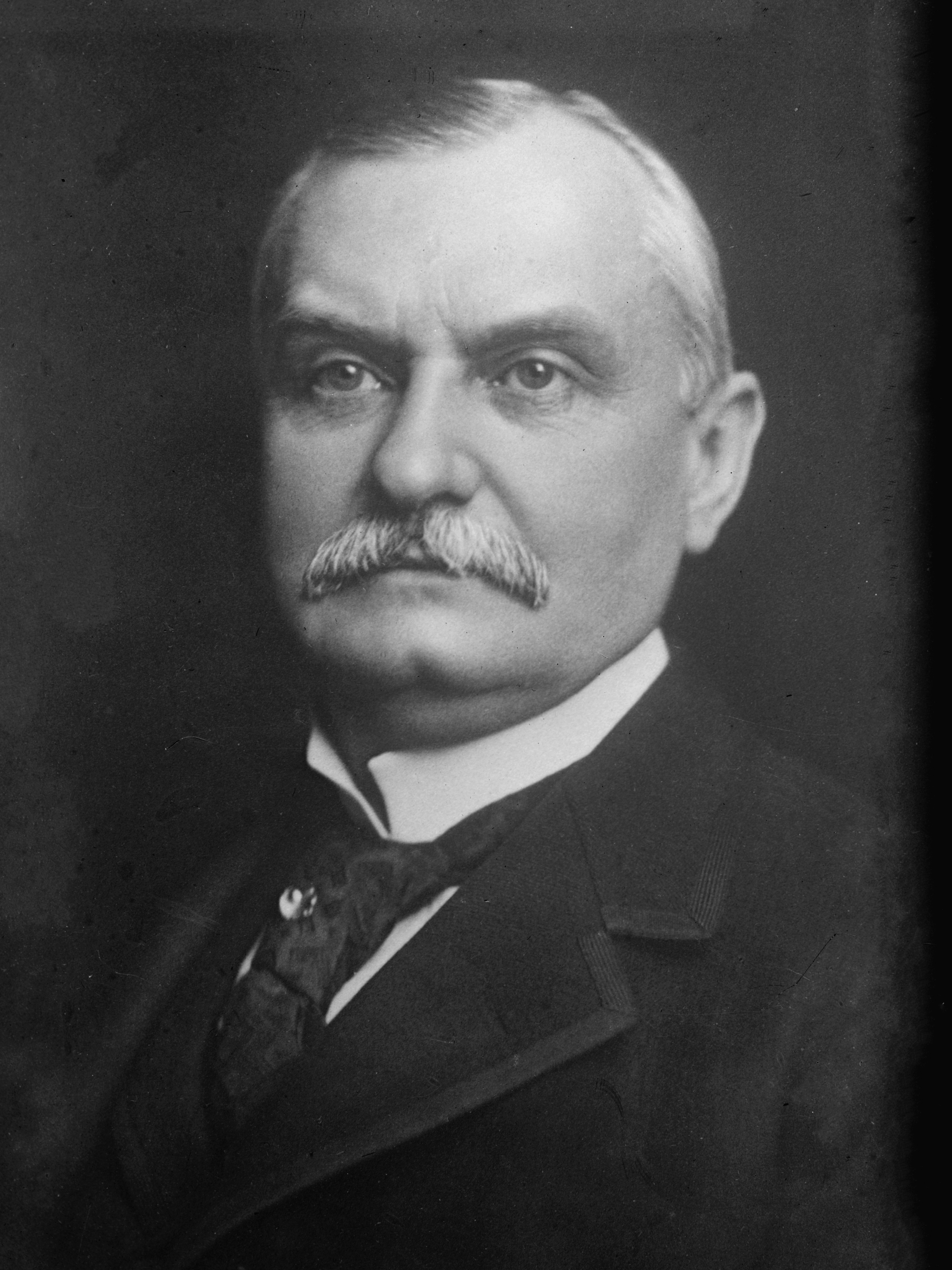
Thomas Fortune Ryan

Mohun was selected, in May 1907, by Thomas Fortune Ryan and Daniel Guggenheim, founders of the Forminière company to undertake a prospecting operation on the Uele River in the Kasai and Maniema regions. The result was the 1908 Ryan-Guggenheim Expedition, a rubber and mineral prospecting party funded by American capital and accompanied by a member of the US Geological Service. This was in two parts, a scientific expedition led by SP Verner for the American Congo Company that sought to trial the "Mexican Process" of utilising acetone for rubber extraction in the Congo, and a mineral prospecting party, the Mohun-Ball Expedition (also known as the Mission de Recherches Minières), with mineralogist Sydney Hobart Ball and mining engineer Alfred Chester Beatty, that sought out new gold, copper and coal deposits. The expedition was also tasked with capturing a live specimen of the Okapi for which a wealthy resident of Paris had offered a $5,000 reward. Mohun was appointed chief of the Mohun-Ball expedition when it set out in 1907.

Late that year the party came under attack by a force of flintlock-armed cannibals and, with the assistance of a 25-strong unit of Belgian native soldiers, repelled the attack—inflicting 125 dead for the loss of five native porters. In press reports of the time Mohun was described as an ex-US Army officer who had been involved in revolutions in several South American countries. The incident became locally known as the "Battle of Ball's Run". A further attack in January 1908 was more successful, causing the party to flee the area. Mohun's men eventually reached safety at Kamgamyka in March.

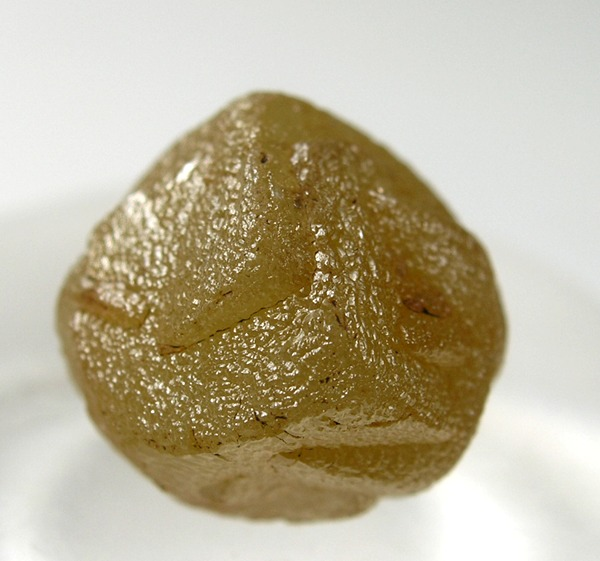
A raw diamond from the Kasai region

The expedition ended in 1909, by which time it had uncovered valuable diamond deposits at Tshikapa, the first such to be located in the country, and recommended the mineral-rich Kasai region to Forminière for further investigation The expedition was judged favourably in relation to Verner's party, who were forced to abandon their attempts to introduce the Mexican process. The discovery of diamonds opened a new source of revenue for the colony and many subsequent American expeditions were carried out in search of further deposits. Mohun's contract with Forminière expired in November 1909 and he returned briefly to his family in the USA. In 1910 he was commissioned by the Rubber Exploration Company to inspect rubber concessions in South Africa, Rhodesia, Mozambique, Madagascar and Equatorial Africa and to negotiate their purchase on behalf of the company. Although Mohun left the company early the next year, the concessions proved successful with the first shipments of rubber arriving in the US in August 1911.

== Later life and legacy ==
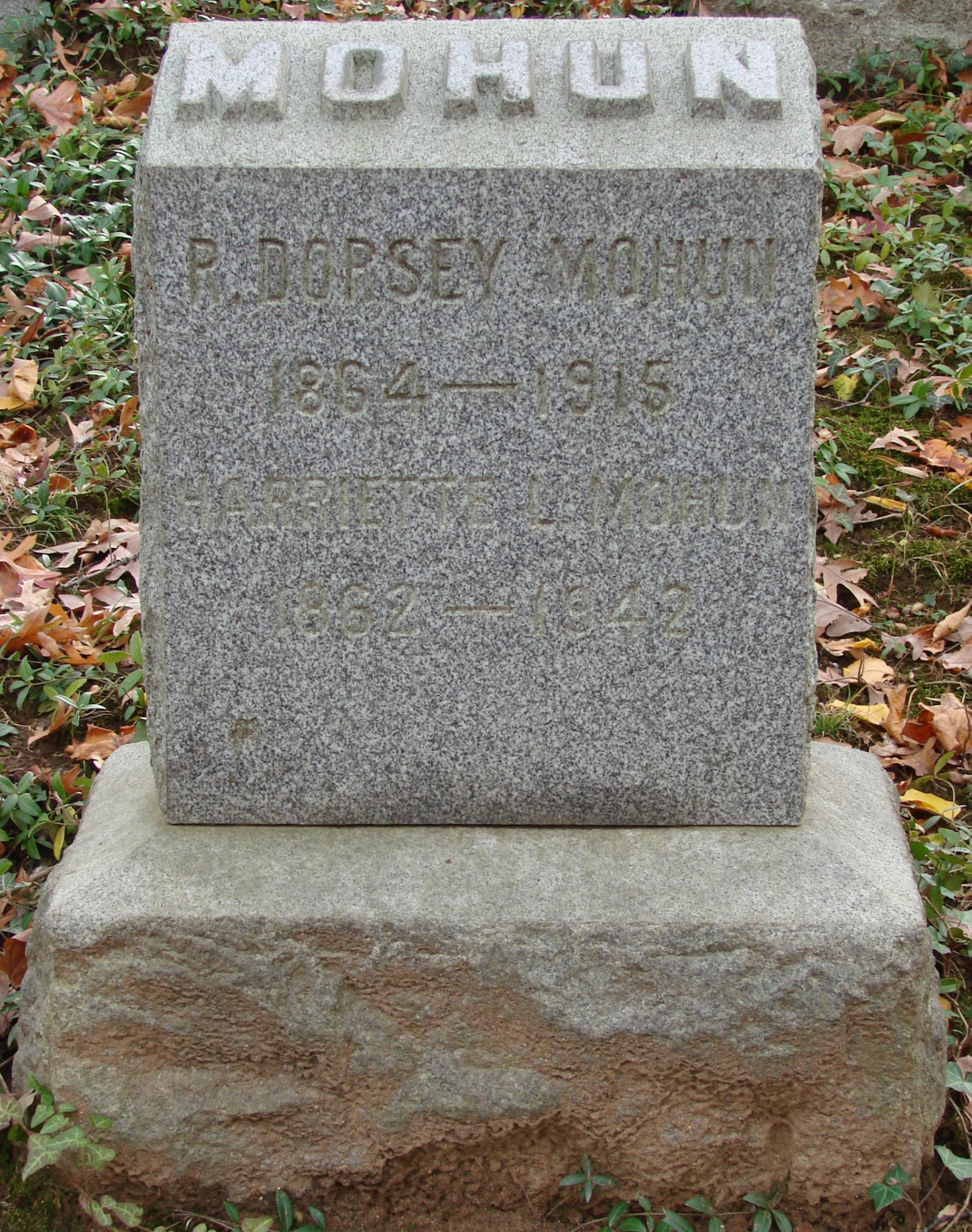
Grave of Richard and Harriette Mohun in Oak Hill Cemetery, Washington, D.C.

In August 1911 Mohun returned to his home at Royal Oak, Maryland, to recover from wounds he had received during his twenty years service in Africa. His convalescence included a period spent in the Virginia mountains. He served as paymaster for the American Red Cross expedition aboard SS Red Cross (former SS Hamburg) sent in 1914 under command of Admiral Aaron Ward to Belgium carrying first aid supplies to assist those wounded during World War I. Aged 50 and without any prior signs of illness, he died of a fever on July 13, 1915. Although he was alone when he fell ill at two o'clock in the morning a non-Catholic woman made a 26 miles (42 km) journey to fetch a priest to conduct the Last Rites. Mohun's funeral service was held at the Cathedral of St. Matthew the Apostle and he was interred in the family plot at Oak Hill Cemetery. During his postings in Africa he had returned to the USA only three times.

During his career Mohun received honours from the British, French and Belgian governments and was a member of the Royal Geographical Societies of Britain, France and Belgium. He was a fluent speaker of Arabic and Swahili in addition to his native English. A sizeable collection of ethnographic information and objects that Mohun collected in Africa is now held in the collection of the Smithsonian Museum and many of his papers are held by the Belgian Royal Museum for Central Africa and the US National Archives and Records Administration. Harriette Mohun died on October 6, 1942, in Stamford, Connecticut and was buried alongside her husband.
