= Sydney H. Ball =

American geologist and mining engineer

- Born: December 11, 1877; Chicago, United States
- Died: April 3, 1949 (aged 71); New York City, United states
- Education: University of Wisconsin
- Spouse: Eleanor Moffatt
- Engineering career
- Discipline: Mining engineering, geology
- Practice name: Rogers, Mayer & Ball
- Significant advance: Discovery of the Congo-Angola diamond field

Sydney Hobart Ball (December 11, 1877 – April 3, 1949) was an American geologist and mining engineer. Educated at the University of Wisconsin, Ball spent his early career in public service. In 1907 he left the US to prospect for minerals in the Belgian Congo for the Forminière company. Ball discovered the first part of the Congo-Angola diamond field, which proved a valuable source of revenue. Returning to America, Ball established a private practice and acted as consultant to a number of public bodies.

== Early life and career ==
Ball was born in Chicago on December 11, 1877, and attended the University of Wisconsin. His later success as a geologist was recognised in a 1909 list of distinguished alumni by William Herbert Hobbs, who taught at the university from 1889 to 1906. Ball worked as a geologist for the Missouri Bureau of Mines and Geology from 1901–2 before returning to the University to lecture in geology from 1902 to 1903. He became an assistant geologist to the United States Geological Survey (USGS) in 1903 and in this role was one of the first researchers to investigate prehistoric Native American gem mining. He authored a USGS bulletin on copper deposits in Hartville, Wyoming, in 1906. Ball's 1907 work A Geologic Reconnaissance in Southwestern Nevada and Eastern California may have been responsible for starting a myth that Death Valley was named "Tomesha" ("Ground Afire") by the Paiute, a story often repeated by subsequent publications. He also contributed to a study of the geology of Georgetown, Kentucky, carried out by Josiah Edward Spurr and George Garrey that was published as a book in 1908.

== In the Congo ==
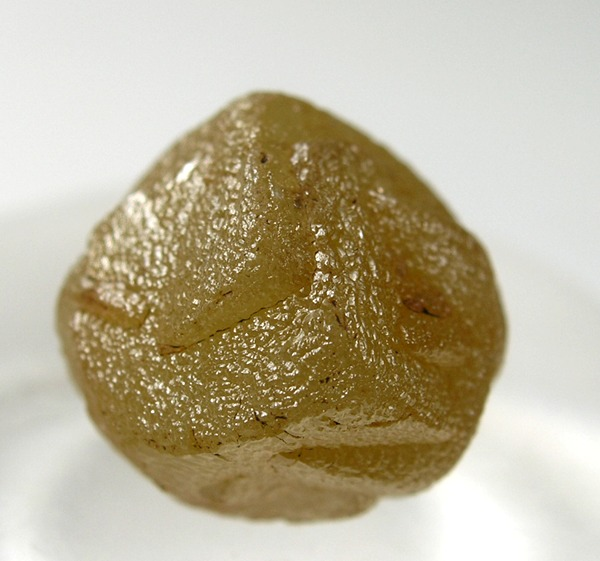
A raw diamond from the Kasai region

In 1907 Ball left the USGS and was appointed to the 1908 Ryan-Guggenheim Expedition (also known as the "Mission de Recherches Minières"), a rubber and mineral prospecting expedition funded by Thomas Fortune Ryan and Daniel Guggenheim. Ball, with United States explorer Richard Mohun and mining engineer Alfred Chester Beatty, were tasked with finding deposits of gold, copper and coal in the Forminière concession in the Belgian Congo.

Late in 1907 the party came under attack by a force of flintlock-armed cannibals and, with the assistance of a 25-strong unit of Belgian native soldiers, repelled the attack—inflicting 125 dead for the loss of five native porters. The incident became known locally as the "Battle of Ball's Run". A further attack in January 1908 was more successful, causing the party to flee the area temporarily.

== Later life ==
The expedition ended in 1909, by which time it had uncovered valuable diamond deposits at Tshikapa (the first discovery of the vast Congo-Angola diamond field), the first such to be located in the country, and recommended the mineral-rich Kasai region to Forminière for further investigation. The discovery of diamonds opened a new source of revenue for the colony and many subsequent American expeditions were carried out in search of further deposits.

Ball co-authored Economic Geology of the Belgian congo, Central Africa in 1914 and co-founded Rogers, Mayer & Ball consulting engineers in 1917, of which he remained a member until his death. In 1931 he published a paper in Economic Geology on the history of gem mining. Ball worked as a consultant mineralogist to the United States Bureau of Mines and, from 1942 to 1944, served as a mining consultant to the War Production Board. He died on April 3, 1949, in New York City. His work on Roman precious stones was published posthumously by the Gemological Institute of America in 1950.
