= Clendenin J. Ryan =

American businessman (1905–1957)

- Born: Clendenin James Ryan Jr. July 16, 1905; New York City, United States
- Died: September 12, 1957 (aged 52); New York City, US
- Education: Princeton University
- Spouses: Countess Etti von Wurmbrand-Stuppach (m. 1935; div. 1935) Jean Harder (m. 1937)
- Children: 5
- Relatives: Thomas Fortune Ryan (grandfather); Ida Mary Barry Ryan (grandmother)

Clendenin James Ryan Jr. (July 16, 1905 – September 12, 1957) was an American businessman best known as the publisher and owner of The American Mercury magazine, published in Baltimore, Maryland.

== Early life ==
He was the eldest son of Clendenin James Ryan and Caroline S. (née O'Neil) Ryan. His brothers were George Francis Ryan, Richard Nelson Ryan and his sister was Caroline Clendenin Ryan (who was engaged to Ronald Lambert Basset, (Note: Basset later married Lady Elizbaeth Legge, a daughter of the 7th Earl of Dartmouth in 1931.) before marrying John K. Shaw Jr. Stuart K. Hotchkiss, and Calvin Pardee Foulke). His father committed suicide by gas poisoning on August 21, 1939.

His maternal grandfather was George Francis O'Neil and his paternal grandparents were Thomas Fortune Ryan and Ida Mary (née Barry) Ryan (a daughter of John Smith Barry, a prosperous dry goods merchant who mentored his grandfather). In 1922, his uncle, banker Allan A. Ryan, declared bankruptcy with liabilities of $32,435,477.28 and assets of $643,533 in what was described as "the biggest failure in New York in recent years, and one of the biggest on record." Through Allan, he was a first cousin of New York State Senator Allan A. Ryan Jr. Upon the death of his grandfather in 1928, he inherited a part of the fortune of more than $141,000,000 left in trust.

Ryan attended St. George's School in Newport, Rhode Island before attending Princeton University, where he graduated with the class of 1928.

== Career ==
Ryan once served as an assistant to Mayor Fiorello H. La Guardia of New York City, ran for New York mayor himself on an independent ticket and later campaigned for New Jersey Governor. Ryan served in the United States Navy during World War II under Admiral James Forrestal.

He and Godfrey Stillman Rockefeller were stockholders in the Enterprise Development Corporation, a closed end investment trust for the heirs of William Rockefeller and Thomas Fortune Ryan, Clendenin's entrepreneurial grandfather, who invested heavily in Copper Mining and ore smelting. The Directors of EDC included Ryan, Frederic W. Lincoln IV, who married into the Rockefeller family, and Morehead Patterson of American Machine and Foundry (AMF).

=== Newspaper career ===
In May 1949, Ryan began publishing a weekly newspaper known as The Public Guardian. Just one month later in June 1949, after withdrawing from the New York City mayoral campaign against incumbent mayor William O'Dwyer, he announced that he would cease publication of the newspaper.

In 1950, Ryan headed a group that purchased The American Mercury magazine, published in Baltimore, Maryland, from Lawrence Spivak which Ryan renamed The New American Mercury.

== Personal life ==
In 1935, Ryan was introduced to Countess Maria Anna Paula Ferdinandine von Wurmbrand-Stuppach (1914–2003), known as Etti, by Prince Chlodwig Hohenlohe. By their third date, Ryan proposed to her and they were married on February 20, 1935, in Saint Patrick's Cathedral in New York. Mayor Fiorello La Guardia was best man. The marriage only lasted three months; they divorced in July 1935 and she returned to Europe with "a settlement of only $35,000."

In 1937, he married Jean Harder (1915–1991), a daughter of George Achilles Harder Sr., a Titanic survivor and, his first wife, Dorothy (née Annan) Harder. Jean, whose younger half-brother was actor James Harder, attended the Ethel Walker School in Simsbury, Connecticut and at the time of their marriage, served on the staff of the Civic Information Bureau. At the time of their wedding, he was living at 834 Fifth Avenue. Together, they were the parents of:

- Clendenin James Ryan III (1939–1978), who married Ann Johnson, a daughter of Thomas Johnson, in 1961
- Robert Harder Ryan, who married Shelley Ann Beck in 1981
- Cyr Annan Ryan, president of Fiber Optic Systems, Inc. who married Mary Frances O'Hara in 1974
- Caryn Ryan, who married Roger Wolcott Tuckerman in 1960; they later divorced
- Jean Ryan Sadler

In 1949, he purchased The Cliffs, a forty-three-acre estate in Oyster Bay held by the Beekman family for more than a century. The property was "on the West Bay Harbor, overlooking Oyster Bay Harbor," and included "a main residence with seventeen rooms, superintendent's cottage, barns, a storage house and boathouse" and fronted "2,000 feet on the harbor" and had "a bathing beach and deep-water anchorage for yachts." After his death, his 2,000 acre estate in Allamuchy, New Jersey was sold to Robert Conahay III.

Ryan committed suicide at the age of 52 in 1957 "in the same five-story, gray stone town house at 32 East Seventieth Street where his father, Clendenin James Ryan Sr., committed suicide by gas poisoning on August 21, 1939." After a funeral at St. Jean Baptiste Roman Catholic Church, located on Lexington Avenue at 76th Street, he was buried in the family plot at St. Andrew-on-Hudson in Poughkeepsie, New York. His net estate was valued at $689,686 in 1961. In 1969, his widow married William Shields Jr., a senior partner in the Coudert Brothers law firm.
