= Charles Hoffbauer =

French-American painter (1875–1957)

- Charles and Henrietta Hoffbauer in Richmond, Virginia, 1938
- Born: Charles Constantin Joseph Hoffbauer; June 28, 1875; Paris, France
- Died: July 26, 1957 (aged 82); Boston, Massachusetts
- Education: École des Beaux-Arts
- Known for: Painting
- Spouse: Henrietta Brownell Hoffbauer (married June 17, 1930)
- Awards: Bronze Medal (Exposition Universelle); Gold Medal, Prix Rosa Bonheur, and Prix National du Salon (Paris Salon); Croix de Guerre; Doctor of Fine Arts (University of Richmond)

Charles Constantin Joseph Hoffbauer (June 28, 1875 – July 26, 1957) was a French-born artist who became a United States citizen. He painted a wide variety of subjects, including many that depicted scenes of historical interest.

== Early life and education ==
Charles Hoffbauer was born in Paris. His parents, Féodor Hubert Hoffbauer and Marie Clemence Belloc Hoffbauer, were of Alsatian origin. Féodor Hoffbauer was a well-known archeologist, architect, and artist, and likely influenced his son's interest in history. As a child, Charles sometimes assisted his father in conducting research. The elder Hoffbauer's 1882 book on Paris architecture, Paris à Travers les Ages, has been updated over the years and remains in print with the latest edition published in 2007.

After receiving a traditional elementary and secondary education in French schools, Hoffbauer attended the École des Beaux-Arts for three years. He studied under Fernand Cormon, François Flemeng, and symbolist painter Gustave Moreau. Classmates of Hoffbauer included Paul Baignères, Charles Camoin, Henri Evenepoel, Raoul du Gardier, Henri Manguin, Albert Marquet, Henri Matisse and Georges Rouault. Shortly before his 21st birthday, Hoffbauer reported for his mandatory French military service. He trained at Falaise, Normandy for 18 months. Completing his military service in September 1897, he returned to Paris and began his career as an artist.

== Early career and awards ==
Hoffbauer's early works received recognition and awards. In 1898 his painting Reunion de bourgeois aux XIVe siècle earned an honorable mention at his first exhibition at the Paris Salon. The following year, he received a gold medal for Les Gueux, becoming the youngest artist to receive this award. The Musée de Rouen in France purchased the painting. In 1900 he received a bronze medal at the Paris Exposition Universelle. At the 1902 Paris Salon his painting Revolte des Flamandes earned the Prix Rosa Bonheur and was purchased by the Philadelphia Museum of Art. The French government awarded a traveling fellowship for this painting, which allowed Hoffbauer to spend the summer of 1903 in Italy. In 1904, he exhibited Champs de bataille at the Paris Salon. Although it received no awards, the painting earned favorable comments and was purchased by the Musée de Luxembourg.

At the 1905 Paris Salon, Hoffbauer entered his painting Sur les toits, which depicts several well-dressed diners at an upscale New York City rooftop restaurant. Although he had never visited the United States, Hoffbauer had chanced to see some photographs of New York skyscrapers in a bookstore window while visiting Rome. Based on his memory of the photographs, he imagined what a rooftop dining scene would look like and painted a preliminary study after returning to Paris in 1904, using his friends and fellow artists Raoul du Gardier and Rudulph Evans as models. Shortly before the opening of the Paris Salon, Hoffbauer became dissatisfied with his work and decided to withdraw and revise the painting for resubmission. The new version, which was completed in 10 days, earned no awards but received significant critical acclaim. According to one reviewer, "'Sur les toits' is without question the most interesting picture of the year; it is accepted as the 'nail' of the Old Salon.... After this picture...there is not at this Salon any other which can be described as more than pleasing." The Art Gallery of New South Wales (Sydney, Australia) purchased the painting, and it remains in their collection today. It was also displayed in London at the 1908 Franco-British Exhibition. Hoffbauer painted a smaller, rearranged version, which he renamed Roof Garden, New York, and sold to the Carnegie Institute.

Hoffbauer's 1906 painting of Triomphe d'un Condottiere was a significant step in his career. The painting depicts victorious warriors returning triumphantly to Florence, Italy, in the 15th century. Hoffbauer entered the work in the Paris Salon, where it earned the Prix National du Salon. The award, the highest prize of the Salon, provided a substantial 10,000 franc traveling fellowship. Over the next few years, Hoffbauer visited Great Britain, Belgium, the Netherlands, Milan, Cairo, Luxor, Aswan, Athens, Rome, Venice, and the United States. He also continued to enter paintings in the Paris Salon, including A Londres, which depicts a couple in evening attire preparing to leave a stylish restaurant. The painting was purchased (and is currently owned) by the Hermitage Museum in St. Petersburg, Russia.

Hoffbauer first arrived in the United States in New York City on December 21, 1909. His friend and fellow artist Charles Dana Gibson met him as he arrived and helped establish Hoffbauer in the New York art community. For the first time he was able to visit the skyscrapers that he had used in Sur les Toits and later wrote to his mother that he had accurately depicted the rooftop setting. He painted watercolors while visiting the Adirondacks, and in Boston he made drawings of local airplane races. In New York City, he began a long-term professional relationship with Roland Knoedler of Knoedler Galleries. Knoedler became Hoffbauer's U.S. representative and held numerous exhibitions of the artist's work, including a 1912 repainting of Triomphe d'un Condottiere. By the following year, Hoffbauer had established himself as a well-regarded artist with an international reputation.

== Confederate Memorial Association murals ==
=== Contract and initial development ===
One of the attendees at the exhibition of the repainted Triomphe d'un Condottiere was James Wall Finn. Finn, a painter himself, was searching for an artist for a large project on behalf of Thomas Fortune Ryan and James Taylor Ellyson. Ellyson, lieutenant governor of Virginia and a former private in the Confederate army, was president of the Confederate Memorial Association. In 1912, the Association had nearly completed its headquarters building, the Confederate Memorial Institute (popularly known as Battle Abbey (Note: Founded in 1896, the association was established to honor Confederate soldiers who died in the Civil War. In 1946, the Virginia Historical Society absorbed the association and became the owner of Battle Abbey and its contents. See "About VHS-Our History.")), in Richmond, Virginia. Ellyson's goal was to decorate the south wing of the building as a memorial to the valor of the fallen Confederacy. He stated, "I have for several years had the ambitious desire to have a collection of mural paintings similar to those to be found in the great gallery at Versailles." He secured $20,000 in funding from Ryan, a native Virginian and wealthy New York financier. Finn was impressed with Hoffbauer and his work and recommended the artist to Ryan and Ellyson. On July 27, 1912, Ellyson and Hoffbauer signed a four-page contract requiring the artist to "... provide all material and perform all work for the Mural decorations of the four walls of the south wing of the Confederate Memorial Institute." The artist's compensation was $20,000, and he was to complete the project within 2 years. The contract specified that Hoffbauer would "guarantee the performance and good condition of his work" for 20 years after completion. He also agreed to copyright the murals and retain the copyright in his possession.

In January 1913, Hoffbauer began work at the Institute. He used thousands of Mathew Brady photographs as a means of visualizing scenes from over a decade before his birth, and ready access to Civil War veterans next door at the R.E. Lee Camp provided a source of living history. To produce the murals, Hoffbauer drew hundreds of small pen-and-ink sketches. From these, he created 60 larger pastel and crayon drawings. Most of the sketches and drawings were created on grids so that the images could be proportionately enlarged for final painting on the mural walls. He also prepared over a dozen three-dimensional clay models, which allowed him to test perspectives and the arrangement of characters and equipment in order to determine the optimal staging of scenes. For human models, Hoffbauer chose local citizens, including Bob Campbell, a local stonemason whose likeness was used for many of the common soldiers; sculptor Edward Valentine for a doctor; Patterson Avenue resident Julian Garthright for a wounded soldier on a hospital cot; Garthright's aunt, a United Daughters of the Confederacy librarian, for a nurse; a Jefferson Hotel bellman for a black soldier; and James Ellyson for an artilleryman.

=== War service ===
Hoffbauer had worked for over 18 months on his 2-year contract, when on August 8, 1914, he departed for France with the murals only partially completed. Although he had met his military obligation, he was a reservist in the French army and decided to return to his homeland to fight in World War I. He enlisted as a private in the 274th Infantry Regiment. In a January 27, 1915, letter to Ellyson, Hoffbauer reported, "I volunteered to go to the front, and was sent near Rheims.... After a period of most bloody battles ... my regiment is now checking the Germans before Rheims. We live in trenches, and are rapidly returning to the state of civilization of the cave man. I am writing this letter in a little hole ... six feet underground.... My fountain pen and the telephone apparatus hanging near me (for I am a telephonist) are the only remains of civilization ... thousands and thousands of men will die...." In a later letter he wrote, "I went to Soissons too. Soissons is entirely ruined and the battle field was awful to look on. Everywhere tanks and airplanes battered down and out of order, dead horses and men and guns and ammunition spread over the fields, an awful sight." Hoffbauer also wrote an article for Leslie's Illustrated Weekly, titled "Horrors of Trench Life in France." For a time, he served as an official war artist and also worked as a liaison between the Camouflage Section of his unit and the American camouflage unit. He was promoted to sergeant and received the Croix de Guerre for bravery in the Battle of the Somme.

=== Completion ===
His war service concluded, Hoffbauer spent a few months at his home in France and vacationed in Italy. He returned to Richmond to resume work on the murals in May 1919. To the astonishment of the Confederate Memorial Association, Hoffbauer completely removed all of his prior work and began anew. He stated, "Not being satisfied with the work already done in the Confederate Memorial, [I] scrap[p]ed over the whole thing and started all over again on a new design." His battlefield experience had provided a new perspective on armed conflict that he desired to capture in his Civil War scenes. Hoffbauer completed the project in January 1921 and shortly thereafter commented, "I have given the best that is within me to the work." Hoffbauer's completed artwork, the Memorial Military Murals (Note: In 2010, the Virginia Historical Society began a multi-year program to clean and conserve the murals, which had been damaged by water and environmental contaminants. The murals are the largest artifact held by the society. See "Restoring the Hoffbauer Murals. ") (also known as the Four Seasons of the Confederacy), consists of four large panels reflecting progressive stages of the war from the perspective of the Confederate military (artillery, infantry, and cavalry) along with four smaller panels along the east and west walls with complementary scenes. The Association's display of the murals to the public on February 1, 1921, was met with praise and earned Hoffbauer considerable recognition.

== Later career ==
After leaving Richmond, Hoffbauer obtained additional mural and other art commissions. In May 1921, he received a commission to paint a mural at the recently completed Missouri State Capitol (the prior building was destroyed by fire in 1911). The large mural, located in the House of Representatives, shows Missouri troops in France during World War I. Hoffbauer painted the mural in a studio in France and shipped it to the United States. Hoffbauer's link to obtaining the mural commission may have been Evarts Tracy, who was the commander of the American Camouflage Corps and one of the architects of the Missouri capitol. In 1923, the Hotel des Invalides in Paris commissioned Hoffbauer to paint decorations in the Salle d'Honneur, for which he later received the Prix de l'Institut de France. He exhibited several works in Canada, France, and the United States. He extensively decorated the Château d'Artigny' ballroom and library for perfume magnate François Coty. In 1930, he painted a large mural for the town hall of Arras, France.

In 1935, Hoffbauer attended in Paris a showing of the Walt Disney movie The Three Little Pigs. After viewing the movie, it occurred to him that his artistic ability would be a good match for the animation field and that motion pictures could provide an excellent venue for conveying history. With the idea of making an historical animated movie, over the next two years Hoffbauer researched Napoleon's 1812 invasion of Russia and drew thousands of sketches. From these sketches, he created 120 temperas, which he titled Napoleon's Russian Campaign. In April 1938, Hoffbauer returned to the United States to repair some damage to the Confederate murals and to accept an honorary doctor of fine arts degree awarded by the University of Richmond. He visited New York in July and arranged a meeting with Walt Disney. Hoffbauer presented the temperas and the idea of an animated historical motion picture. Disney was impressed but explained that the Napoleonic theme was not consistent with the typical subject matter of his movies. He stated, "Mr. Hoffbauer, I'll never be the artist you are, but ... I deal in whimsy." However, he offered to assist the artist if Hoffbauer came to Hollywood.

In 1939, Hoffbauer and his wife, Henrietta, moved from Paris to Hollywood. To assist Hoffbauer, Disney prepared a technicolor filmstrip of the 120 Napoleonic campaign temperas. Hoping to further interest in a motion picture based on the paintings, Hoffbauer exhibited the temperas at the Los Angeles Museum and stated, "We artists must ... use this great contemporary medium [animation]." Despite contacts with several motion picture personnel, including actor Douglas Fairbanks, Jr., and producer Walter Wanger, Hoffbauer was unable to generate interest in the material as a movie. Hoffbauer also painted a set of temperas titled The History of Williamsburg in the hope of making an educational filmstrip for the Colonial Williamsburg Foundation. Even though Dr. Douglas Southall Freeman, the Pulitzer Prize-winning editor of the Richmond News Leader, encouraged and endorsed the project, the foundation showed no interest.

Disney hired Hoffbauer as a research artist for his studio in January 1940. Hoffbauer worked on The Life and Stories of Hans Christian Andersen, which combined animation and live action, a technique pioneered by Disney. Hoffbauer painted a series of watercolors on Joan of Arc but was unsuccessful in gaining interest for an animated movie on the subject. In July, the New England Life Insurance Company engaged Hoffbauer to paint eight murals at their headquarters in Boston. The murals depict Boston history from 1622 to 1798. Hoffbauer spent five months in Boston researching the area's history and, as he had done with the Confederate murals, preparing numerous sketches. He painted the murals in Hollywood and shipped them to Boston when nearly complete. The company installed them in May 1942 for a convention, and then removed them for four months of on-site finishing by Hoffbauer. His work garnered positive comments, with one reviewer stating, "This artist, who so loves history, has managed to present it, not as a series of theatrical events, but as something alive and breathing today."

Hoffbauer, who became a U.S. citizen in 1941, continued his association with Disney for several years. The studio executive sent the Napoleon filmstrip and a project summary to British movie producers Alexander and Vincent Korda. While not opting for the Napoleon endeavor, they offered to employ Hoffbauer on a production of War and Peace. However, World War II soon ensued, and the project was cancelled. Hoffbauer later worked for Paramount Studios as a technical consultant on the movie Monsieur Beaucaire. In 1948, the Fairbanks Company hired him as a technical advisor and artist. In 1951, at the request of the University of California, Hoffbauer gave a lecture in French based on his father's book Paris à Travers les Ages to commemorate the 2,000th anniversary of the founding of Paris. Reviving the possibility of a production of War and Peace, Hoffbauer contacted director Fred Zinneman about working on an upcoming Mike Todd film based on the novel. To Hoffbauer's disappointment, Italian producer Dino De Laurentiis acquired the rights to the story and made the movie without the artist's assistance. Hoffbauer and his wife left California and moved to Rockport, Massachusetts in May 1952. In nearby Boston, Hoffbauer painted an additional mural for the New England Life Insurance Company. For the Hayden Planetarium, he painted one of his most unusual works—a tempera showing the surface of the Moon with the Earth just above the Moon's horizon. Hoffbauer continued an active painting career for the remainder of his life.

== Death ==
In July 1957, Hoffbauer visited with Rockport officials and reviewed the new town hall under construction. He offered to decorate the new building with a mural depicting the town's history. The painting would be a gift to the town, and he requested no commission. A week later in Boston he suffered a ruptured aorta. He died at Massachusetts General Hospital the following day, July 26, 1957.
