= Sally Ryan =

American sculptor (1916–1968)

- Born: Sarah Tack Ryan; July 13, 1916; New York City, New York
- Died: June 29, 1968 (aged 51); London, England
- Occupation: Artist
- Relatives: Allan A. Ryan Jr. (brother); Thomas Fortune Ryan (grandfather); Ida Mary Barry Ryan (grandmother)

Sarah "Sally" Tack Ryan (July 13, 1916 – June 29, 1968) was an American artist and sculptor best known for portrait style pieces and her association with the Garman Ryan Collection.

== Biography ==
Sally Ryan was born in New York City, the daughter of Allan Aloysius Ryan (1880–1940) and Sarah Tack Ryan. She was the granddaughter of Thomas Fortune Ryan, a successful Irish-American entrepreneur. Allan A. Ryan, Jr. was her elder brother. Fortune Ryan had commissioned a portrait bust of himself by Auguste Rodin, now in the Tate collection in London.

Sally Ryan went to school in Montreal and her artistic career began in 1933, when she exhibited her first sculpture at the Royal Canadian Academy of Arts in Toronto. The following year she went on to study with the sculptor Jean Camus in Paris, where she achieved an 'honourable mention' at the annual Salon. She exhibited work at The Royal Academy of Arts in London in 1935. Ryan was an associate of the poet Ralph Gustafson and sculptor Jacob Epstein. Epstein made a portrait bust of Ryan, who for a brief time became his only pupil. Ryan would later purchase several important works by Epstein. Aged twenty, Ryan had a successful solo show at the Cooling Gallery which included her portrait busts of Ellen Ballon, Paul Robeson and Arturo Toscanini. After four years in London, Ryan returned to the United States in 1938. Dividing her time between Connecticut and London, her work featured in exhibitions in both Europe and the United States. In 1940, Ryan's work was included in Philadelphia's International Sculpture Exhibition, prior to her second solo show in New York the following autumn.

Ryan used much of the inheritance she received from her grandfather to build a wide-ranging art collection, alongside her life-long friend, Kathleen Garman. Ryan died of cancer of the throat (squamous cell epithelioma of the larynx) in 1968 while staying at The Dorchester in London. Variously described as "aloof", "private" and androgynous in appearance, Ryan was gay and lived with another woman, who became the chief beneficiary of her will. She also bequeathed $50,000 and her art collection to Kathleen Garman to establish the Garman-Ryan collection, now housed at The New Art Gallery Walsall. As well as several works by Ryan, the collection also contains many works by Jacob Epstein, Garman's husband.

== Gallery of works ==
These four works by Ryan are part of the Garman-Ryan collection at The New Art Gallery Walsall.

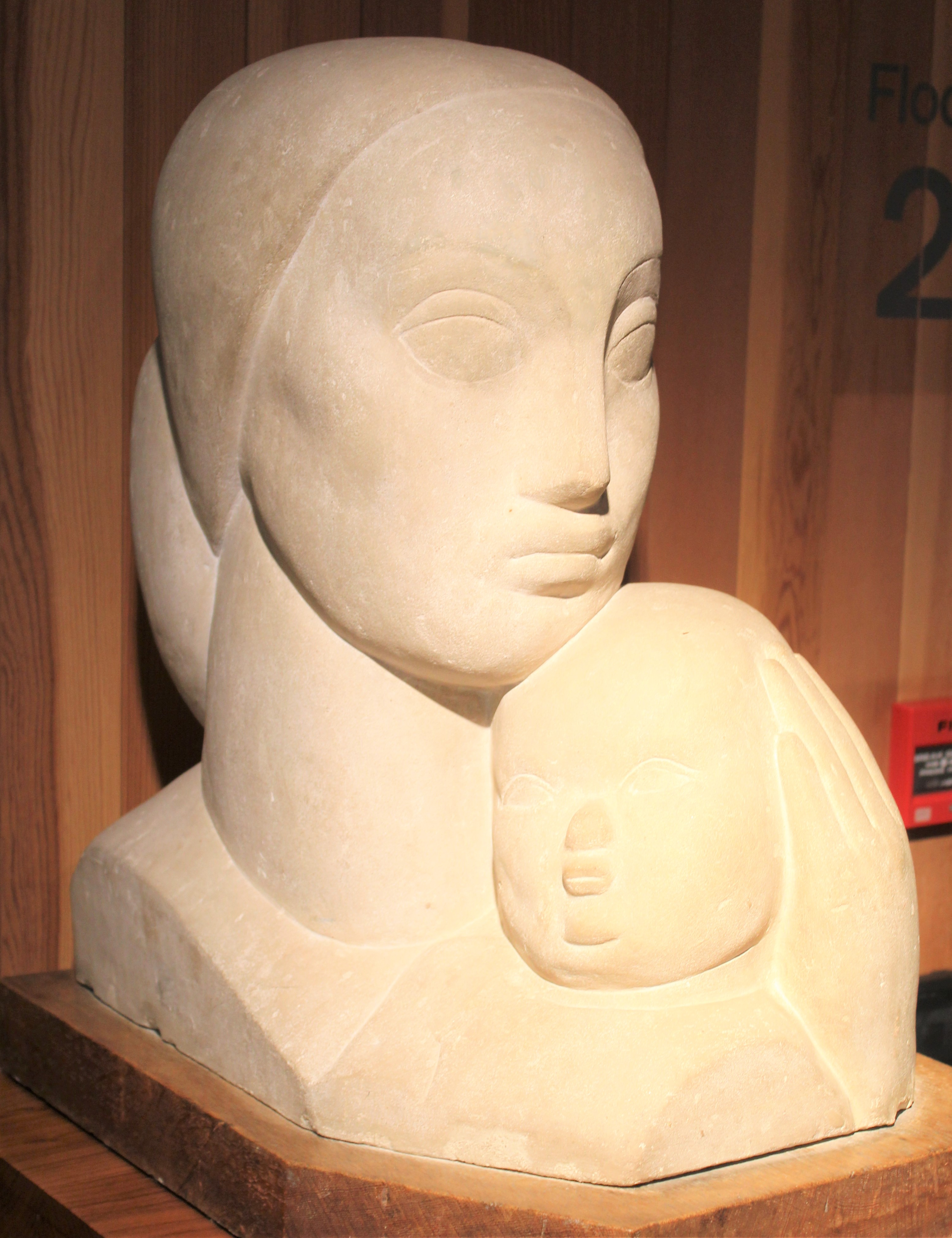
Mother and Child

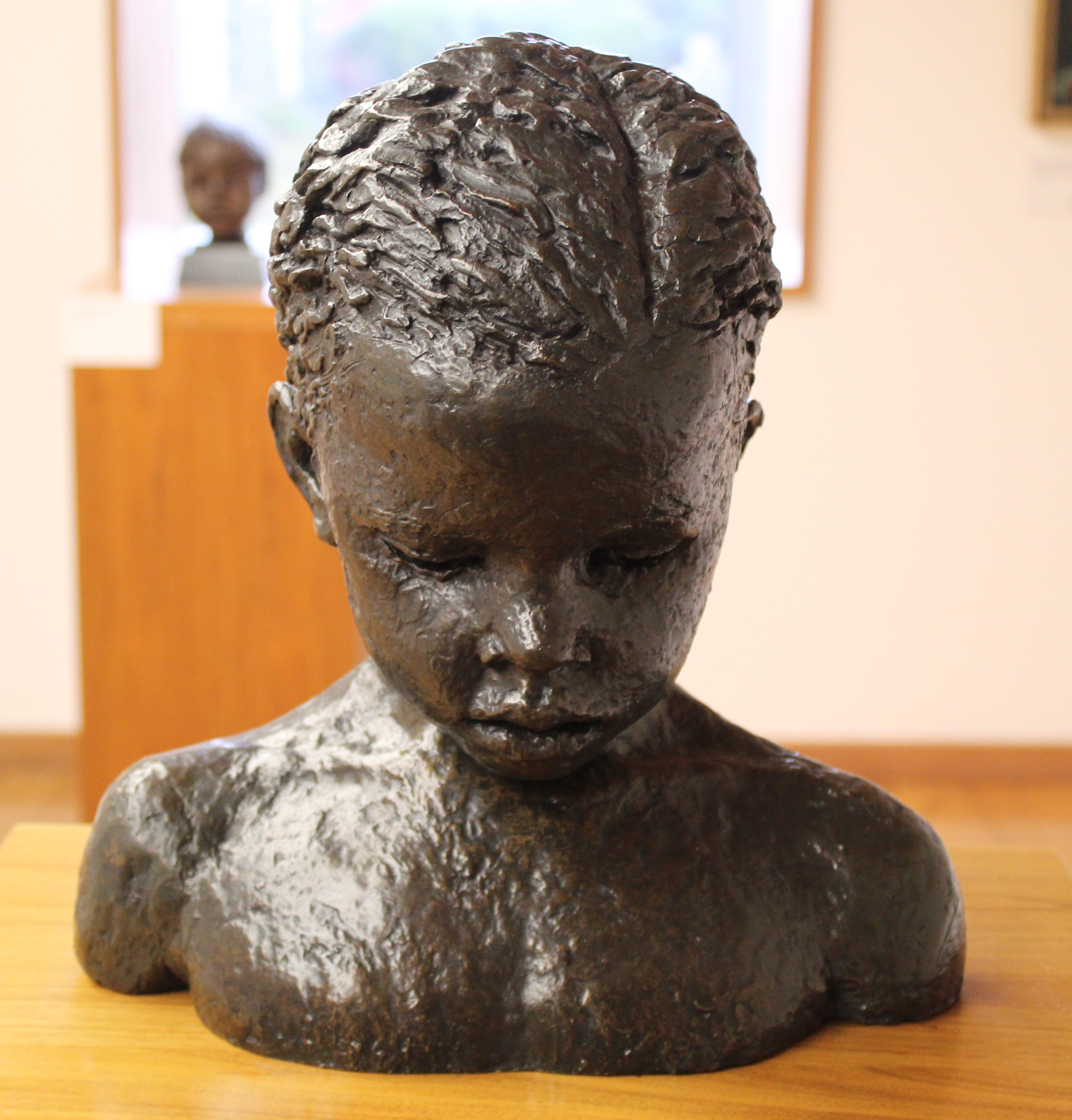
Nathaniel

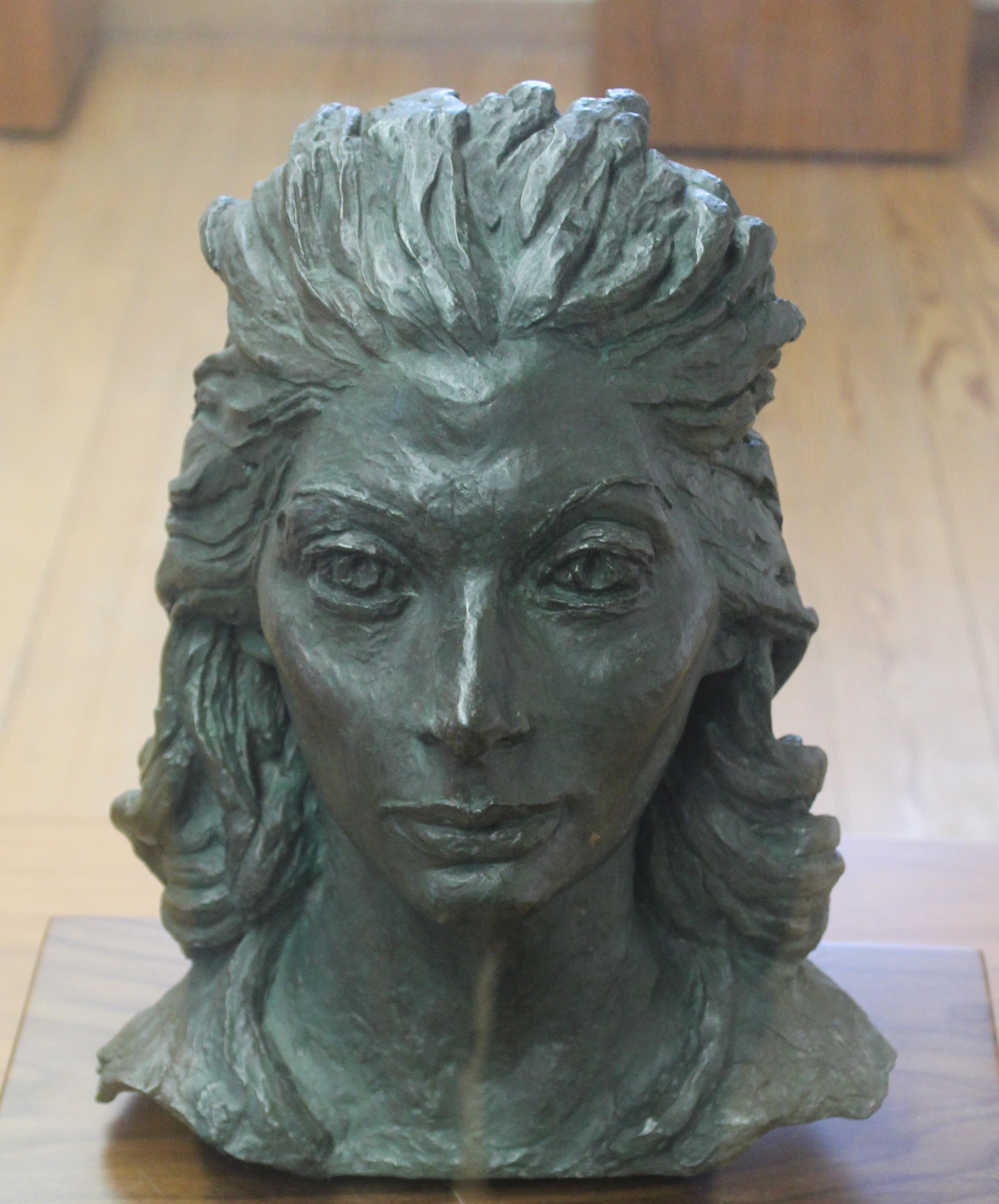
Head of Valentina

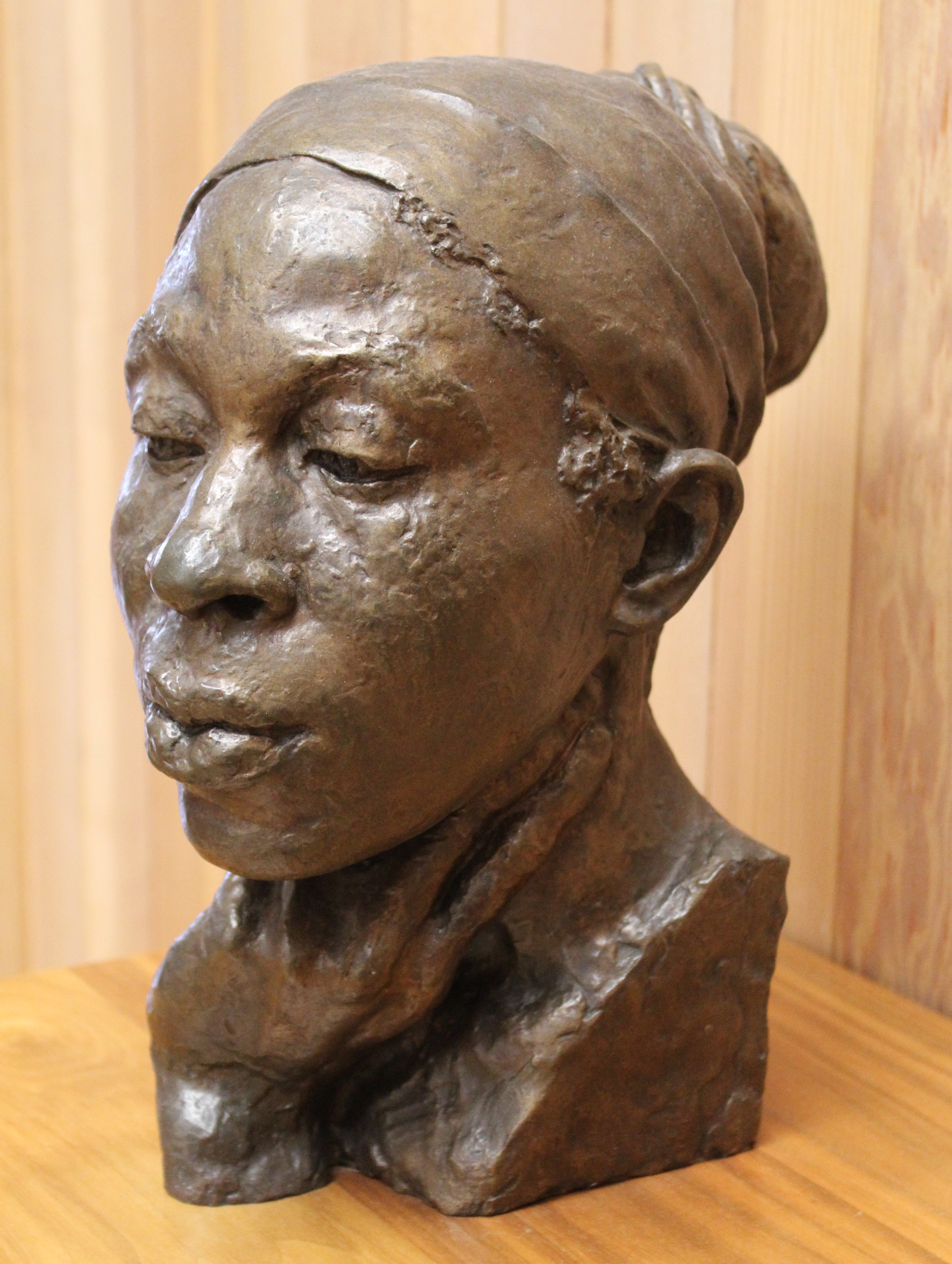
The Martinique, (1934)
