= Frederic H. Bontecou =

American politician and equestrian

Frederic Holdrege Bontecou

Member of the New York Senate from the 33rd district
- In office 1945–1947

Member of the New York Senate from the 28th district
- In office: 1943–1944; 1934–1938

Personal details
- Born: November 30, 1893 Kansas City, Missouri, U.S.
- Died: September 17, 1959 (aged 65) Washington, New York, U.S.

Frederic Holdrege Bontecou (November 30, 1893 – September 17, 1959) was an American farmer and politician from New York.

Bontecou was elected on July 5, 1934, to the New York State Senate (28th D.), to fill the vacancy caused by the death of J. Griswold Webb,[6] and took his seat in the 157th New York State Legislature during the special session which began on July 10. He was re-elected twice, and remained in the State Senate until 1938, sitting in the 158th, 159th, 160th and 161st New York State Legislatures. He was a delegate to the New York State Constitutional Convention of 1938. At the New York state election, 1938, he ran on the Republican and Independent Progressive tickets for Lieutenant Governor of New York, with Thomas E. Dewey for Governor, but was defeated by Democrat Charles Poletti.

Bontecou was again a member of the State Senate from 1943 to 1947, sitting in the 164th, 165th and 166th New York State Legislatures. He was a delegate to the 1944, 1952 and 1956 Republican National Conventions. On May 9, 1947, he resigned his seat, effective June 1.[7]

== Life ==
He was born on November 30, 1893, in Kansas City, Missouri, the son of Daniel Bontecou (1851–1924) and Nathalie (Holdrege) Bontecou (1857–1941). He attended Brown University. In 1916, he served with the Rhode Island National Guard on the Mexican border. On August 17, 1917, he married Cornelia Thurston Metcalf (died 1965), daughter of U.S. Senator Jesse H. Metcalf (1860–1942), and they had four children. He served during World War I overseas in the U.S. Army as a lieutenant. After the war he engaged in the breeding of Aberdeen Angus cattle and thoroughbred horses. He was a member of the American equestrian team which competed at the 1924 Summer Olympics in Paris. Bontecou, riding Bally McShane, won the King George Gold Cup in 1926, and the Brooks-Bryce Foundation Cup in 1927.

Bontecou was elected on July 5, 1934, to the New York State Senate (28th D.), to fill the vacancy caused by the death of J. Griswold Webb, and took his seat in the 157th New York State Legislature during the special session which began on July 10. He was re-elected twice, and remained in the State Senate until 1938, sitting in the 158th, 159th, 160th and 161st New York State Legislatures. He was a delegate to the New York State Constitutional Convention of 1938. At the New York state election, 1938, he ran on the Republican and Independent Progressive tickets for Lieutenant Governor of New York, with Thomas E. Dewey for Governor, but was defeated by Democrat Charles Poletti.

Bontecou was again a member of the State Senate from 1943 to 1947, sitting in the 164th, 165th and 166th New York State Legislatures. He was a delegate to the 1944, 1952 and 1956 Republican National Conventions. On May 9, 1947, he resigned his seat, effective June 1.

He died on September 17, 1959, at his home in Mabbettsville, New York; and was buried at the Nine Partners Burial Ground in Millbrook.

== Sources ==
Party political offices
Preceded by Ralph K. Robertson	Republican nominee for Lieutenant Governor of New York; 1938	Succeeded by Thomas W. Wallace
New York State Senate
Preceded by J. Griswold Webb	New York State Senate; 28th District; 1934–1938	Succeeded by Allan A. Ryan Jr.
Preceded by Allan A. Ryan Jr.	New York State Senate; 28th District; 1943–1944	Succeeded by Lowell H. Brown
Preceded by Benjamin F. Feinberg	New York State Senate; 33rd District; 1945–1947	Succeeded by Ernest I. Hatfield
