= Société Royale Belge de Géographie =

The Société Royale Belge de Géographie (In English, the Royal Belgian Geographical Society) or SRBG, is a Belgian learned society which works to promote geographical sciences.

== History ==
The Société was founded on 27 August 1876 as the Belgian Society of Geography a few days before the opening of the Brussels Geographic Conference to promote the exploration of various parts of the world. It was initially involved with commercial investment in Belgian colonies. In 1882 King Leopold II authorised the society to use the prefix "Royal". Although it was later funded privately Adrien de Gerlache first unveiled his plans for the Belgian Antarctic Expedition to the society in 1894.

In 1900 the society had more than one thousand members including several explorers such as the American, Richard Mohun. By the middle of the twentieth century the society had changed its objectives from exploration to scientific research and study. The SRBG represents Belgium in the European Society of Geography and publishes the Belgian Journal of Geography, now branded as Belgeo (ISSN 2294-9135). The SRBG awards a gold medal to noted geographers and explorers.

== Presidents ==
- Count Hippolyte d'Ursel.

== See also ==
- Royal Geographical Society of Antwerp

== Bibliography ==
issued by the society

- Bulletin de la Société Belge de Géographie, 1876-1881
- Bulletin de la Société Royale Belge de Géographie, 1882-1961
- Revue belge de géographie, 1962-1999

about the society

- Modern Geography: An Encylopaedic Survey. 1991.
- Barrett-Gaines, Kathryn (1997), "Travel Writing, Experiences, and Silences: What Is Left out of European Travelers' Accounts: The Case of Richard D. Mohun", History in Africa, 24, African Studies Association: 53–70, doi:10.2307/3172018, JSTOR 3172018, S2CID 164350271
- Riffenburgh, Beau (2007), Encyclopedia of the Antarctic, CRC Press, ISBN 978-0-415-97024-2
