= Ida Mary Barry Ryan =

American philanthropist (1854–1917)

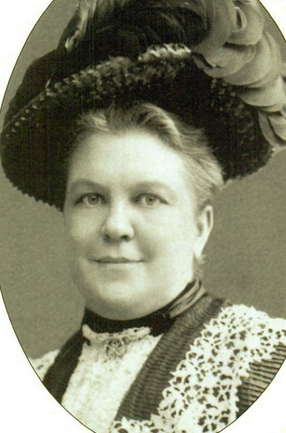
- Born: Ida Mary Barry; December 21, 1854; Baltimore, Maryland, U.S.
- Died: October 17, 1917 (aged 62); Suffern, New York, U.S.
- Occupation: philanthropist
- Spouse: Thomas Fortune Ryan (m. 1873)
- Children: 8
- Relatives: Allan A. Ryan Jr. (grandson); Clendenin J. Ryan (grandson); Sally Ryan (granddaughter); Virginia Ogilvy, Countess of Airlie (great-granddaughter); Peter Ryan (great-grandson)

Ida Mary Barry Ryan (December 21, 1854 – October 17, 1917) was an American philanthropist. She was active in building, endowing, and assisting over 100 churches, chapels, hospitals, and various charities, to which she gave more than US$3,000,000.

== Early life ==
Ida Mary Barry was born in Baltimore, Maryland, December 21, 1854. Her father, Captain John Smith Barry (1829–1872), was a prominent merchant and the owner of a line of vessels plying between Baltimore and the West Indies. Captain Barry was the son of Robert Barry, who married Amelia, daughter of Col. Dennis Ramsay, of Alexandria, Virginia, a colonel in the Revolutionary Army. Her mother was Rosalie (Hillard) Barry (1832–1905). Ida had ten siblings: Benjamin Hillard Barry (1849–1850), Robert Barry (1851–1854), John S. Barry (1853–1854), Anna Hillard Barry (1857–1857), Rosalie C Barry (1859–?), John S. Barry (1861–1862), Amelia R. Barry (1862–1863), Henry A. Barry (1863–1892), J. Bardwell Barry (1866–1867), and Joseph Allen Barry (1869–1939).

== Career ==
On November 25, 1873, she married Thomas Fortune Ryan. She and her husband were generous contributors to many of the charitable institutions and philanthropic work of the church, especially in Virginia. They furnished the interior of the Cathedral of the Sacred Heart of Richmond, Virginia which had been given to the city by her husband, at a cost of US$500,000. They built the Sacred Heart Church, Washington Ward, and Sacred Heart Cathedral School at Richmond; and the church and convent at Falls Church, Virginia. They contributed to churches at Hot Springs, Virginia, Harrisburg, Virginia, and Keyser, West Virginia; the chapel at Suffern, New York, where their summer home was located, and together gave Ryan Hall and a wing to Georgetown University, Georgetown, Washington, D.C. She built a hospital annex for Sisters of Charity in New York City.

== Personal life and legacy ==
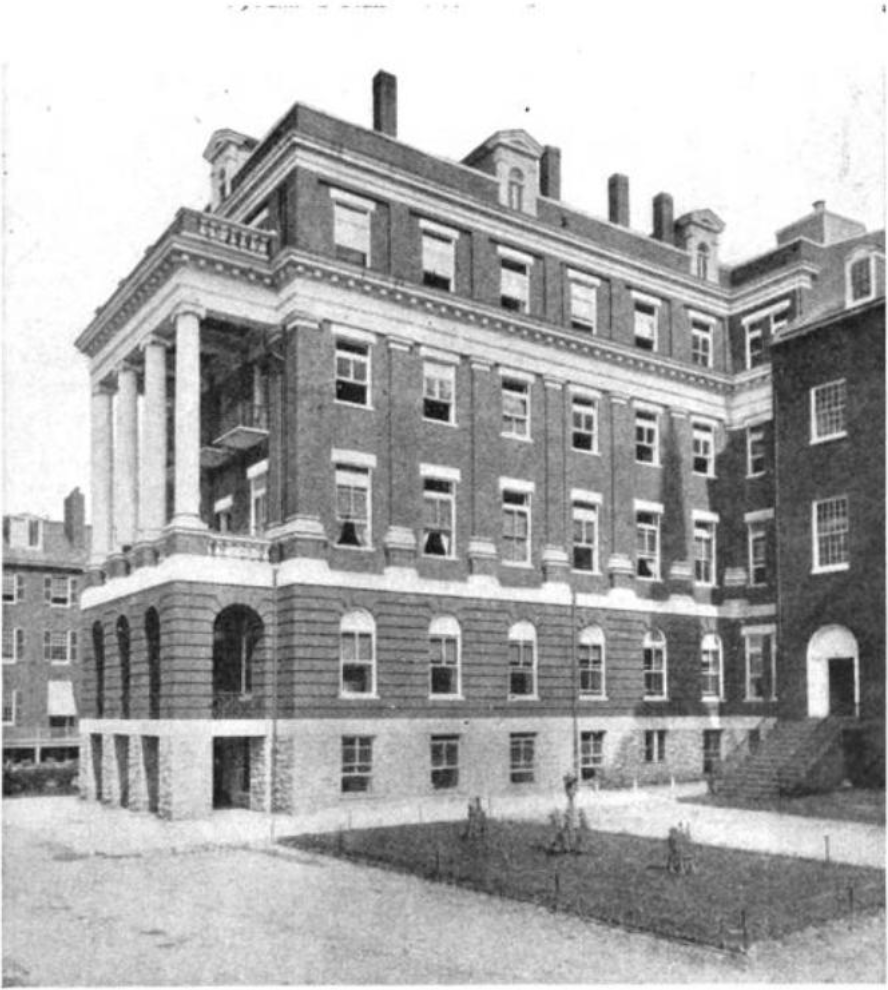
Ida Ryan Hall, Georgetown University after opening (between 1903 and 1907)

Mr. and Mrs. Ryan had eight children:

John Barry Ryan Sr. (1874–1942)

Thomas Fortune Ryan Jr. (1876–1882)

William Keane Ryan (1878–1906)

Allan Aloysius Ryan Sr. (1880–1940)

Clendenin James Ryan Sr. (1882–1939)

Mary Loretta Ryan (1884–1889)

James Joseph Ryan (1890–1920)

Mary Ryan (1892–?)

In 1915, Mr. and Mrs. Ryan visited California.

Ida Mary Barry Ryan died from heart disease after being taken suddenly ill at her country home at Suffern, October 17, 1917. Interment was at St. Andrew-on-Hudson.

== Awards and honors ==
She was decorated with the Cross of St. Gregory and made a Countess by Pope Pius X for her philanthropic work.
