= Château d'Artigny =

Coordinates: 47°16′51″N 0°41′24″E

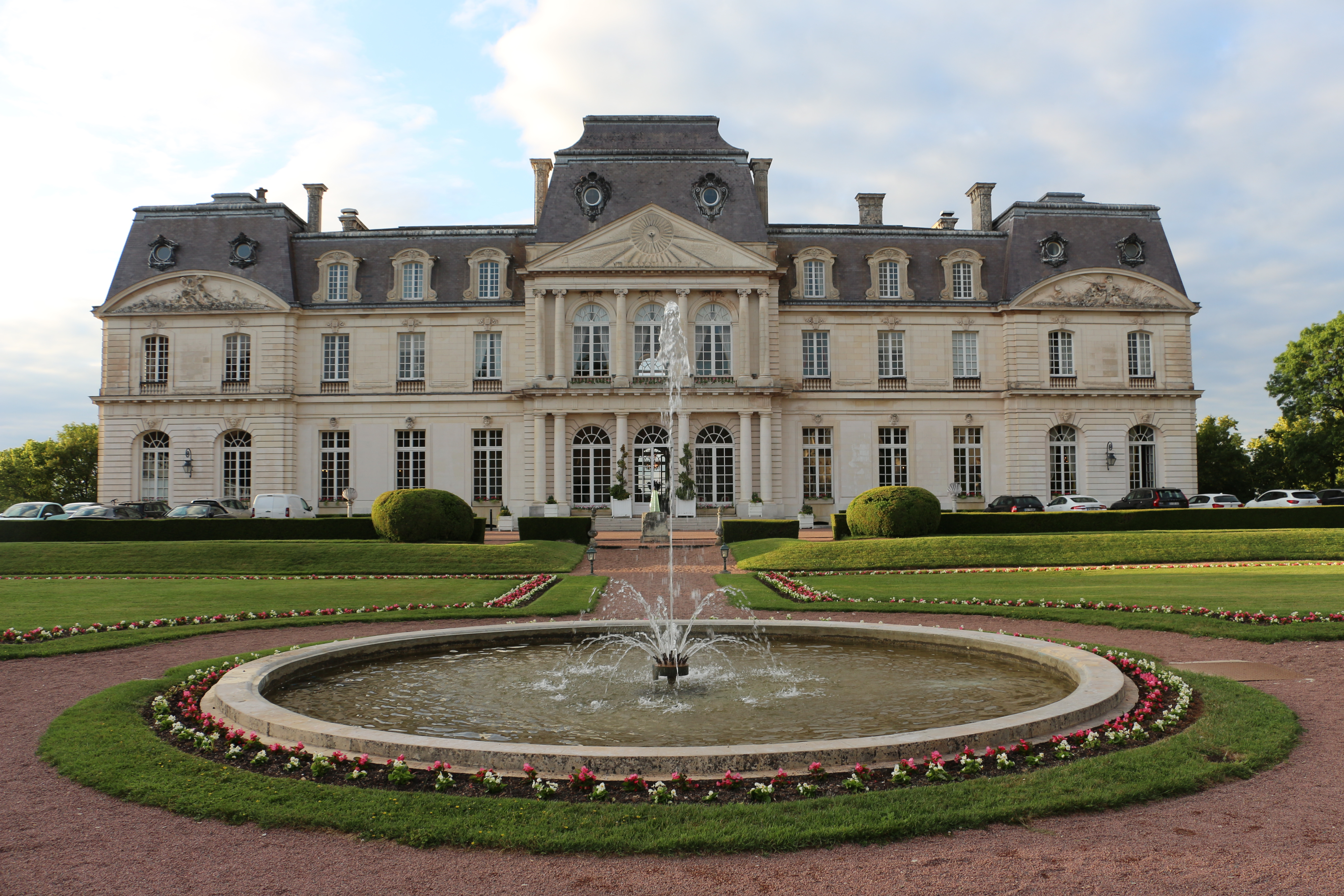
Château d'Artigny.

Château d'Artigny or Château Le Puy d'Artigny is a French castle located in the commune of Montbazon, in the department of Indre-et-Loire in the Centre-Val de Loire region of France. The current structure was built between 1912 and 1928 to serve as residence to perfumer François Coty. Since the late 1950s, the castle has been converted into a hotel.

== The first castles ==
Having originally been constructed as a fortress around the keep of Montbazon, an advanced bastion, during the Hundred Years' War, the Château d'Artigny was incorporated into the line of defences established along the river Indre. Jean d’Artannes captain governor of Montbazon, after whom a nearby village is named, owned it in the fifteen century. The name d’Artannes became over the centuries d’Artigny. It was subsequently altered in the Renaissance style during the 18th century. In the following century it passed in the hands of Joseph Testard de Bouranis, the king's treasurer, who replaced it with a new construction which survived the Revolution and was later modified into a Neo Renaissance style in the 19th Century.

== François Coty ==
On 30 July 1912 perfumer François Coty, bought the château.

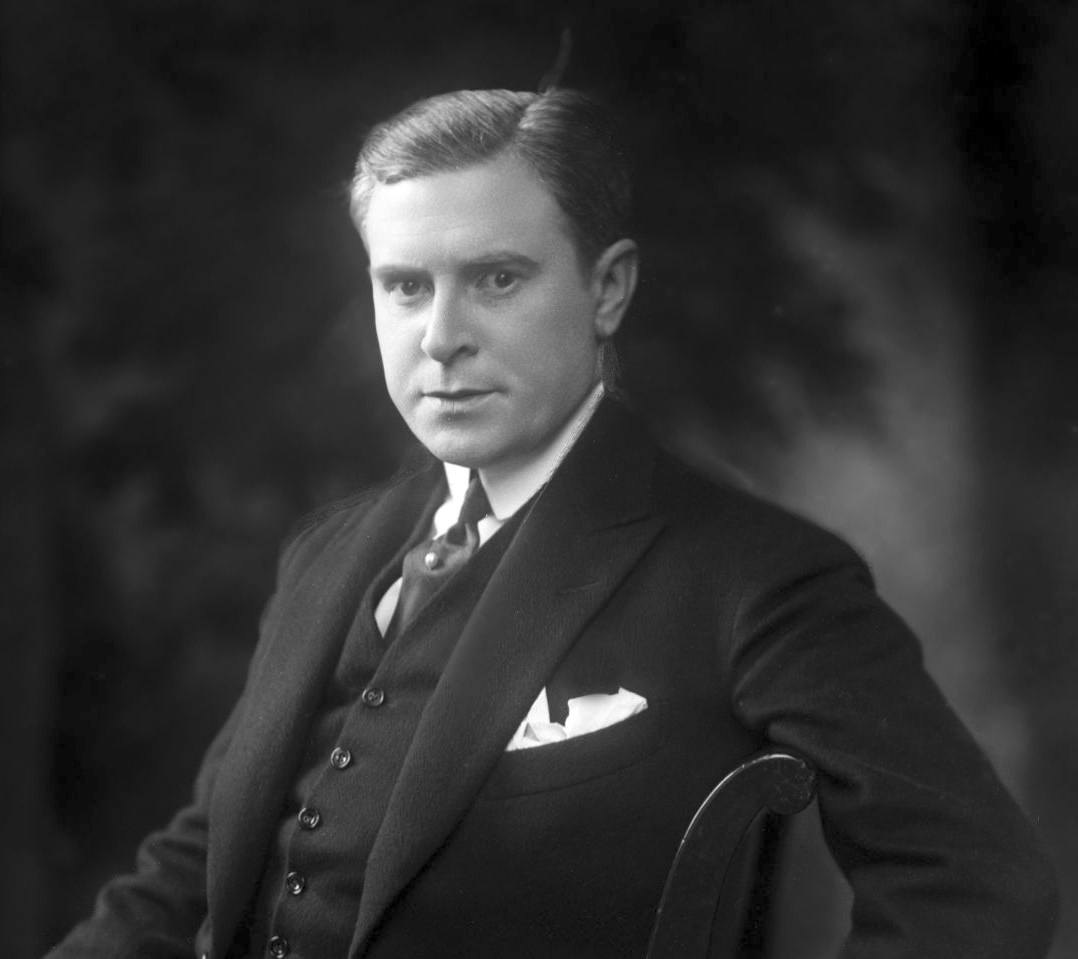
François Coty (Circa 1930).

On a journey around Touraine he was captivated by the location but, feeling the building to be unbalanced and badly placed on the cliff overlooking the Indre, he had the château pulled down and rebuilt 12 metres further away on new foundations. Measuring 60 metres by 18 metres and 27 tall. On the outside, it was almost a mirror image of the château at Épinay-Champlâtreux which was constructed by the architect Jean-Michel Chevotet between 1751 and 1757. The interior plan of the château, however, was inspired by the Château de Voisins, near Rambouillet, where a long gallery gives on to a series of huge rooms all linked to each other. There was a grand reception room, a library, a small salon, a dining room and the main stairwell. A chapel, a copy of the one at the Palace of Versailles, albeit a quarter of the size, was connected to the main building by an underground passage.

The main construction work was completed between 1913 and 1928, and the fittings and interior decoration followed. Apart from his perfumes, Coty's finest creation was the Château d’Artigny. Coty, employed architects, Emmanuel Pontremoli, was just one of the architects who along with many draftsmen, was subjected to Coty's active participation in every aspects of the plans and execution. Over one hundred workers labored for twelve years, and still the château was not finished. Master builders, sculptors, carvers, tile setters, painters, craftsmen and labourers. Denys Puech, the official sculptor (a receiver of the Prix de Rome) constructed an 18th-century style allegory on the tympanum of the pediment of the central front section overlooking the Indre valley. Nothing was too fine or too luxurious: the polished stone stairway from Lens, the dining room with its marble floor from Carrare, inlaid with a variety of bronze motifs, the Regency woodwork and the carved columns gilded with gold leaf.

From 1929 up until Coty's death in 1934 at his residence at Louveciennes, he lived for half of the year at Artigny with his family. During this time, About 40 employees and bodyguards were employed on the estate, which encompassed seven kilometres of river, French gardens, orchard greenhouses, several farms, three mills, a hunting lodge, a rectory and some abandoned school buildings.

The most important room, the most original and most beautiful room of the château is the rotunda on the first floor. This reception room with its high windows overlooking the Indre valley and opening on to François Coty's study is crowned at a height of 9.2 metres by a cupola decorated with a trompe-l'œil by Charles Hoffbauer, a receiver of the Grand Prix de Rome 1924, and depicted a costume ball with friends and family; among them Coty's son-in-law, Paul Dubonnet, actresses Mary Marquet, Edwige Feuillère and Cécile Sorel, the ballet masters Serge Lifar and Serge Diaghilev, the painter Foujita, and the Aga Khan.

== After Coty ==
Following the crash of 1929, and due to a costly lifestyle, a disastrous divorce, and the expense of his press empire, Coty's fortune in liquid assets was much diminished. After his death, the château is temporarily escrowed as security for his creditors and his art collections were sold at auction in 124 lots at the Galerie Charpentier in Paris on 30 November and 1 December 1936.

In 1940, at the time when the French capital was relocated to Tours, the château had been identified as a potential shelter by a local aide-de-camp of Admiral Darlan and was subsequently occupied by the Department of the Navy. In 1941 it lay empty for a few months before being occupied by German troops until 1942, who in the meantime had painted the château brown to act as camouflage. Finally, it served as an annexe of Tours hospital, catering for the seriously wounded.

Coty's family once again took possession of the château in 1947 and were made several offers. The projects to convert it into the head office of Indre-et-Loire's general council or into a holiday park were not followed.

After two years, in the course of which the library was converted into a lounge bar offering a unique collection of cognac, armagnac, port and whisky, it was opened at the end of 1961, under the name of the "Relais d'Artigny", becoming the first hotel company in Centre-Val de Loire. The wine cellar holds around 45,000 bottles of French wine, the finest collection in the world of Touraine wines. Since opening, Artigny has welcomed a number of personalities such as the Queen Mother and in 1963 Haile Selassie I, the last emperor of Ethiopia.

On 24–25 November 1973, under the guise of the establishment's annual closing, the finance ministers of the G5 countries met in the château, with Valéry Giscard d'Estaing presiding for France.

In April 1976, an inconspicuous meeting took place between the French President and his future successor, François Mitterrand.

Artigny still belongs to the family hotel group, "Grandes Étapes Françaises", whose president is Pierre Traversac. The château-hotel has 65 bedrooms, two dining rooms and a spa.

== Bibliography ==
- Toledano, Roulhac (2009). François Coty: Fragrance, Power, Money. Pelican Publishing. ISBN 978-1-58980-639-9.
- Stern, Steven (2006). Stern's Guide to the Greatest Resorts of the World. Stern's Travel Guides, Ltd. ISBN 9780977860807.
