= American Congo Company =

Defunct forestry company in Belgian Congo

- Industry: Resource extraction
- Founded: October 22, 1906 in Albany, New York, United States
- Founders: Thomas Fortune Ryan and Daniel Guggenheim
- Area served: Belgian Congo

The American Congo Company was a US-owned concessionary company that was active in the Congo Free State and its successor, the Belgian Congo. At first it was focused on rubber extraction, but that soon shifted to diamond mining.

== Formation ==
The American Congo Company was founded by Thomas Fortune Ryan and Daniel Guggenheim. Other participants included Edwin B. Aldrich, J. P. Morgan and John D. Rockefeller Jr. The company was incorporated in Albany, New York on 22 October 1906. It was originally capitalized at $510,000, a sum that was soon increased to $25,000,000. Also in 1906, King Leopold II arranged the creation of the Sociètè Internationale Forestière et Minière du Congo (Forminière). Americans took 25% to 50% of Forminière shares, with Leopold, the Congo Free State and Belgian investors holding the rest. One of the purposes of the American Congo Company was to explore and exploit Forminière's mineral resources.

In November 1906 the American Congo Company was granted a 99-year licence to gather rubber and other vegetable products over a tract of land covering 4,000 square miles (10,000 km^{2}). It was also given a 10-year option to buy 2,000 square miles (5,200 km^{2}) of land. The company was to plant 50 feet (15 m) of guayule (Parthenium argentatum) for every 200 pounds (91 kg) of rubber extracted. It planned to conduct experiments on different varieties of rubber plants. The region was along the Congo River up to the confluence of the Kasai River. Leopold was to receive half the profits of the company.

== History ==
Soon after the American Congo Company was formed it was the subject of an exposé by the New York American which claimed that the owners had influenced Secretary of State Elihu Root to keep the United States government from meddling in the Congo Free State. The result of the exposé was that the American government now had good reason to look into what Leopold II of Belgium was doing in the Congo Free State. The treaty of 28 November 1908 ceding the Congo Free State to Belgium included a clause in which Belgium respected the concessions granted to the American Congo Company and Forminière, two companies in which the Congo Free State had large holdings The American Congo Company became a subsidiary of Forminière. Through these two companies Americans owned up to half of the Belgian Congo's diamond operations.

In 1912 the American Congo Company established rubber processing factories in Kimpoko and Black River. In practice, the rapid development of Malayan rubber plantations meant that the Congo development was unsuccessful, and the guayule process was never thoroughly tested. In 1921 the American Congo Company forfeited its forest products license in exchange for full ownership of 386 square miles (1,000 km^{2}) and exclusive rights for 91 years to diamond mines it found elsewhere. By 1926 Forescom was operating the establishments of the American Congo Company in Bolobo and Kwamouth as a tenant.

In the early 1950s, the Brussels office of the American Congo Company was located together with that of Forescom in Brussels, at Rue Royale 54 in a building belong to the Forminière.

In a convention of 6 February 1965 for settling the portfolio of the former Belgian Congo Colony, Article 15 transferred ownership of securities to the Democratic Republic of the Congo. These included 2,500 preferred shares of $100 and 100 common shares of $100 of the American Congo Company. 177,750 shares of Forminière were also transferred.

== Sources ==
- Cana, Frank Richardson (1911). "Congo Free State" . Encyclopædia Britannica. Vol. 6 (11th ed.). pp. 917–928.
- Clay, Dean (May 2019), The Congo Reform Association and the beginning of Transnational Humanitarianism, 1904-1913 (PDF) (Thesis), Liverpool John Moores University
- Convention pour le règlement des questions relatives à la dette publique et au portefeuille de la Colonie du Congo belge (PDF), February 6, 1965
- Davis, Richard Harding (1907), The Congo and Coasts of Africa, New York: Charles Scribner's Sons
- Ergo, André-Bernard, La Société forestière et commerciale du Congo belge FORESCOM (PDF)
- Hartnell, Cameron C. (2009), Arctic Network Builders: The Arctic Coal Company's Operations On Spitsbergen And Its Relationship With The Environment (thesis), Michigan Technological University
- McStallworth, Paul (1955), The United States and the Congo Question, 1884-1914 (thesis), Ohio State University
- Wuliger, Robert (October 10, 2007), "America's Early Role in the Congo Tragedy", The Nation
- Zimmermann, Emil (1918), The German Empire of Central Africa (PDF), New York: George H. Doran Co.
