= Allan A. Ryan Jr. =

American politician

Allan A. Ryan

Member of the New York State Senate from the 28th District
- In office 1939–1942
- Preceded by: Frederic H. Bontecou
- Succeeded by: Frederic H. Bontecou

Personal details
- Born: July 4, 1903 New York City, US
- Died: October 13, 1981 (aged 78) New York City, US
- Resting place: Locust Valley Cemetery, Locust Valley, New York, U.S.
- Spouses: Janet Newbold (m. 1929; div. 1936) Eleanor Barry (m. 1937; div. 1941) Priscilla St. George (m. 1941; div. 1950) Grace Amory (m. 1950)
- Children: 2
- Relatives: Sally Ryan (sister); Thomas Fortune Ryan (grandfather); Ida Mary Barry Ryan (grandmother)
- Occupation: Financier and politician

Allan Aloysius Ryan Jr. (July 4, 1903 – October 13, 1981) was an American financier and politician from New York.

== Early life ==
He was born on July 4, 1903, in Manhattan, New York City, the son of Allan Aloysius Ryan (1880–1940) and Sarah (née Tack) Ryan (1879–1957). His father was a son of Thomas Fortune Ryan (1851–1928), and was a stock broker like his father. Ryan Sr. speculated heavily on the stock exchange, went bankrupt in 1922, and was disinherited by his father.

Ryan Jr. attended Canterbury School, and graduated from Princeton University in 1924.

== Career ==
After graduating from Princeton, he worked in Wall Street, to learn the stock business from the bottom up. In 1928, he inherited a fortune from his grandfather, and opened an investment banking firm with Charles H. Sabin Jr. (only son of Charles H. Sabin, former president and chairman of the Guaranty Trust Company of New York). He got a seat on the New York Stock Exchange in 1930.

Ryan Jr. had a country estate in Rhinebeck and bred Aberdeen Angus cattle in Dutchess County. He was a member of the New York State Senate, representing the 28th district (Columbia, Dutchess and Putnam counties) from 1939 to 1942, sitting in the 162nd and 163rd New York State Legislatures.

During World War II he became a major in the U.S. Army, and served with the Allied Military Government in Europe. After the war, he was chairman of the Board of the Royal Typewriter Company and, after a merger in 1954, became chairman of the Board of Royal McBee.

== Personal life ==
On February 5, 1929, Ryan Jr. married Janet Newbold. Before they divorced in June 1936, they were the parents of:

- Nancy Newbold Ryan (1930–1987), who married English journalist and novelist Alan Brien.

On January 19, 1937, he married Eleanor Barry, a fashion editor of Harper's Bazaar.

On May 29, 1941, Ryan was divorced from his wife Eleanor.

On August 5, 1941, he married Priscilla (née St. George) Duke, daughter of Congresswoman Katharine St. George and ex-wife of Angier Biddle Duke. Before they divorced on September 2, 1950, they were the parents of:

- Katharine Delano Ryan (1942–2015), who married American film and television producer Daniel Selznick.

On December 13, 1950, he married Grace Amory, a noted amateur golfer.

He died on October 13, 1981, in New York Hospital in Manhattan. Allan is buried in Locust Valley Cemetery, Locust Valley, New York.

== Sources ==
New York State Senate
Preceded by Frederic H. Bontecou	New York State Senate; 28th District; 1939–1942	Succeeded by Frederic H. Bontecou
