= Thomas Fortune Ryan =

American businessman and philanthropist

Thomas F. Ryan
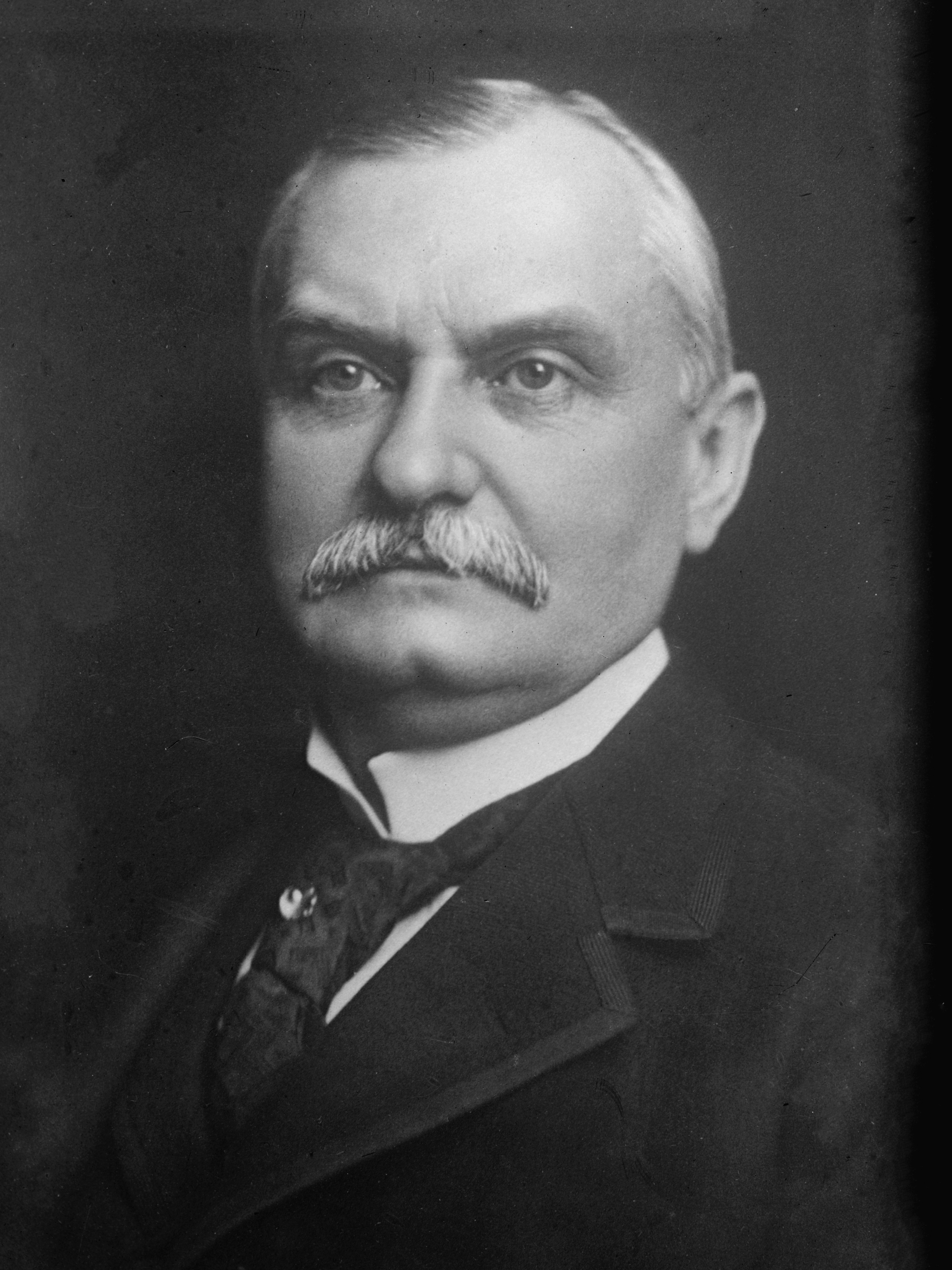
- Thomas Fortune Ryan in the 1910s
- Born: October 17, 1851; Nelson County, Virginia, U.S.
- Died: November 23, 1928 (aged 77); New York City, U.S.
- Occupation: Financier
- Political party: Democrat
- Spouses: Ida Mary Barry (m. 1873; died 1917); Mary Townsend Nicoll Lord Cuyler (m. 1917)
- Children: 8
- Relatives: Allan A. Ryan Jr. (grandson); Clendenin J. Ryan (grandson); Sally Ryan (granddaughter); Virginia Ogilvy, Countess of Airlie (great-granddaughter); Peter Ryan (great-grandson)

Thomas Fortune Ryan (October 17, 1851 – November 23, 1928) was an American tobacco, insurance and transportation magnate. Although he lived in New York City for much of his adult career, Ryan was perhaps the greatest benefactor of the Roman Catholic Diocese of Richmond in the decades before the Great Depression. In addition to paying for schools, hospitals and other charitable works, Ryan's donations paid for the construction of the Cathedral of the Sacred Heart in Richmond, Virginia. Ryan also made significant donations to Catholic institutions in New York City and Washington, D.C.

== Early days ==
Thomas Fortune Ryan was born on October 17, 1851, near Lovingston, Virginia, the county seat of Nelson County. Despite a myth promulgated by Cleveland Amory regarding his background, Ryan was neither orphaned nor penniless as a youth, nor did his ancestors flee the Great Famine of Ireland as did many who worked on or rode his streetcars. Rural Virginia where Ryan grew up attracted few of those emigrants. Ryan's father was a tailor and managed a small hotel. He traced his ancestry to Protestant Anglo-Irish settlers who came to North America in the seventeenth century.

Ryan's mother, Lucinda Fortune Ryan, died in 1856 when he was five years old. His father remarried and moved to Tennessee two years later. Ryan was raised as a Protestant by his mother's extended family in Lovingston, south of Charlottesville in Virginia's Piedmont. Local Baptist ministers taught the youth to read and write, but Ryan did not attend college. Before the American Civil War, Ryan and his younger brother owned three slaves.

== Conversion ==
Aged 17, three years after the war ended, Ryan fled the lack of economic opportunity in post-war Virginia and moved to the nearest big city, Baltimore, Maryland, with $100 in his pocket. En route, Ryan converted to Catholicism, purportedly after long discussions with the conductor.

In Baltimore, John S. Barry, a prosperous dry goods merchant and Catholic, hired young Ryan. By 1872, Barry helped Ryan secure a brokerage assistant position on Wall Street where he would be tutored by William Collins Whitney.

== Fortune building ==
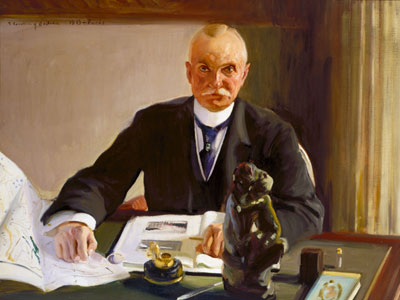
1913 painting by Joaquín Sorolla

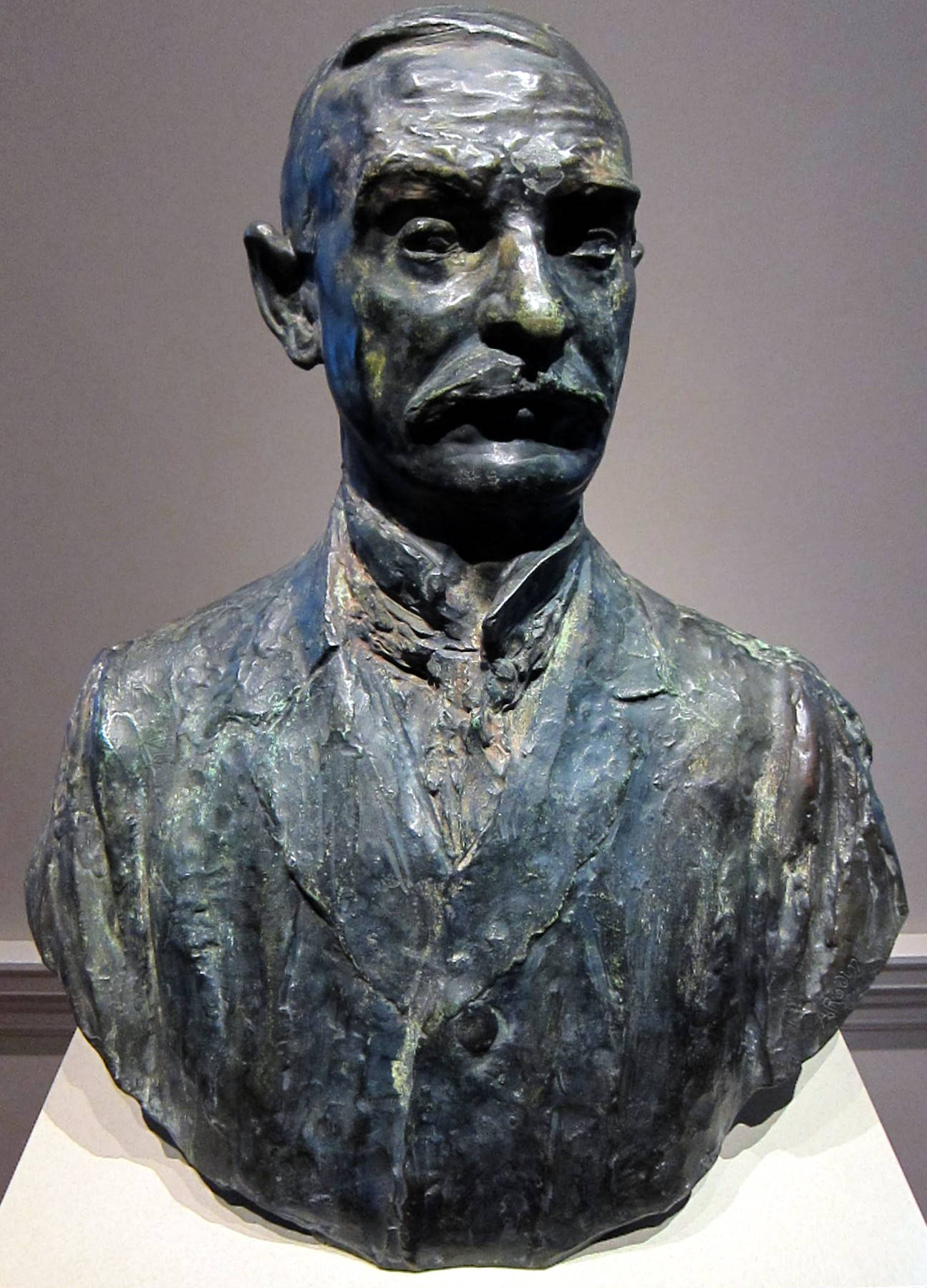
1910 bust of Thomas Fortune Ryan, by Auguste Rodin

Ryan opened a brokerage firm with two partners, Lee, Ryan & Warren, the following year.

In 1873 Ryan married his former boss's daughter, Ida Mary Barry, whose family were devout Roman Catholics. They had eight children. In 1874, his firm purchased Ryan a seat on the New York Stock Exchange. At the same time, Ryan became active in politics, especially with the Tammany Hall machine that controlled much of the city's operations, giving him political and industrial contacts across the city.

Ryan's fortune began in public transit. In 1883, he founded the New York Cable Railroad and bid on the proposed route from lower Manhattan to Midtown. After numerous legal and financial problems, in 1886 Ryan reorganized his cable railroad as the Metropolitan Traction Company. By 1893, construction of Ryan's rail system was underway on Broadway. Metropolitan continually acquired additional lines so that by 1900 it controlled 3,000 cars and 300 miles of track, the majority of New York's streetcar operations.

Ryan's most profitable investment was tobacco. Having invested in its stocks throughout the 1890s, Ryan joined tobacco assets in 1898, forming The Union Tobacco Company. Shortly thereafter, he merged Union Tobacco with his greatest competitor, James Duke of North Carolina, forming the American Tobacco Company. Together Ryan and Duke developed the British-American Tobacco Company to protect the American tobacco trade in Europe. Upon his death, Ryan also had major holdings in R. J. Reynolds and Liggett & Myers.

In 1905, amid public outcry, Ryan purchased the $400-million-strong Equitable Life Assurance Society, a major factor in the insurance industry. Although Ryan strove to make Equitable more responsive to its policy holders, public reaction to his purchase was overwhelmingly negative. His reputation for cutthroat business dealings in the streetcar and subway businesses made the public distrustful. In 1909, Ryan sold his Equitable stock. Also in 1905, Ryan's Metropolitan street car system was threatened by New York's increasingly popular subway system. He merged Metropolitan with August Belmont Jr.'s Interborough Rapid Transit Company. But the joint company's finances were shaky, and Ryan pulled out. Meanwhile, some $35 million that Ryan had raised in a bond issue were misappropriated. Ryan was investigated for corruption in 1908, but the grand jury brought no charges.

Ryan also invested in King Leopold II's Congo Free State. In 1906, he cofounded the American Congo Company with Daniel Guggenheim. He was also an investor in other Belgian colonial concession companies, including the diamond and lumber conglomerate Forminière.

Meanwhile, Ryan was making fortunes with coal mines, banks, public utilities and railroads. He owned Royal Typewriter and backed the maker of the Thompson submachine gun. At one time Ryan had controlling interest in 30 corporations.

== Philanthropy ==
As her husband's wealth grew exponentially, Ida Barry Ryan began making large benefactions to Catholic charitable organizations in New York, Virginia, and across the country. The Ryans funded churches, convents and hospitals in Manhattan, including the architecturally important St. Jean Baptiste Catholic Church on the Upper East Side. In Washington, D.C., they paid for a gymnasium and dormitory at the Jesuit-founded Georgetown University.

In 1901, the Ryans funded the construction of Sacred Heart Church and Sacred Heart School on Perry Street in Manchester, Virginia (now part of Richmond). In the same year, the Ryans donated $250,000 to build a new cathedral in Richmond and soon doubled that donation to ensure that the interior would be of the highest workmanship. The Cathedral of the Sacred Heart, whose cornerstone was laid by the apostolic delegate on June 4, 1903, was dedicated by the same nuncio on November 29, 1906, and remains one of the metropolitan area's architectural landmarks. Other Ryan gifts in Virginia included the Cathedral High and the Cathedral Primary schools in Richmond.

In October 1903, Ryan and his wife donated a two-story brick and steam heated building near the Newport News Shipyard to the Sisters of Charity of Nazareth so they could start a Catholic girls school (to be named St. Vincent's de Paul School and later renamed Peninsula Catholic High School). In June 1904, they donated a new building for the Sisters and their 104 students in their charge. The Ryans also financed construction of Catholic churches in Harrisonburg and Charlottesville.

Pope Pius X recognized the couple's generosity by naming him to the papal nobility and giving Ida Ryan the cross Pro Ecclesia et Pontifice for her work in the Diocese. The couple's lifetime contributions to Catholic charities around the country totalled $20 million. However, Mrs. Ryan refused to allow any funds to be used for "colored work" (including schools and hospitals for Virginia's freed blacks, despite diocesan missionary priorities of the time).

The Ryans' philanthropy also extended to Southern history, the fine arts and exploration. Ryan financed and selected Charles Hoffbauer to create a series of paintings, "The Four Seasons of the Confederacy", commissioned for a major gallery in what is now the Virginia Historical Society. For Jamestown's 300th anniversary in 1907, Ryan donated a collection of portraits of key players in Virginia's settlement. Thomas Ryan also helped finance Virginia explorer Richard E. Byrd's flight to the South Pole.

In 1887, the Ryans bought the Groesbeck mansion near Suffern, New York in what is today the village of Montebello in the Town of Ramapo, a major municipality on the Erie Railroad, and rebuilt it into a summer home they called "Montebello". During the three decades before her death, Ida Barry Ryan funded the construction of the Catholic Church of the Sacred Heart of Jesus, as well as the Good Samaritan Hospital.

== Later years ==
Ryan announced his intention to retire in 1912. Re-establishing his roots in his native state of Virginia, he had since 1901 maintained "Oak Ridge" in Nelson County, formerly the estate of tobacco trader William Rives and later of former Confederate and U.S. Congressman William Porcher Miles. Ryan also became a Virginia delegate to the Democratic National Convention in 1912, which selected fellow Virginian Woodrow Wilson as the party's presidential candidate.

In 1916, Thomas Fortune Ryan was also the principal financial backer of John T. Thompson's Auto-Ordnance Company for the purpose of developing his "auto rifle" and the Thompson Submachine-Gun.

On October 17, 1917, on his 66th birthday, his wife Ida died from heart disease. Twelve days later, Ryan married widow Mary Townsend Lord Cuyler. The resulting scandal did not deter Belgian Cardinal Desire-Joseph Mercier from accepting Ryan's proffered private railway car in 1919, which he used in touring the United States and accepting honorary degrees and awards concerning his country's defense against the invading Germans.

== Death and legacy ==
On November 23, 1928, Thomas Fortune Ryan died, the South's wealthiest native son and the nation's 10th wealthiest man. He left a fortune of more than $200 million. He was buried on his Oak Ridge estate, as was his second wife, Mary. Although a place had been reserved for Ida Barry Ryan in the crypt of Richmond's Sacred Heart Cathedral, she was ultimately interred in the cemetery at St. Andrews-on-Hudson Seminary in Hyde Park, New York (now The Culinary Institute of America).

Ryan's eldest son John Barry Ryan (1874–1942) became a financier and writer. Another son, Alan A. Ryan was bankrupted in 1922 after a spectacular 1920 effort to corner the market in the Stutz Motor Car Company, of which he was President. Alan A. Ryan was expelled from his seat on the New York Stock Exchange as a result. His grandson Allan A. Ryan Jr. (1903–1981) was a New York State Senator from 1939 to 1942. His granddaughter Sally Ryan was a noted art collector. A great-granddaughter was Virginia Fortune Ryan Ogilvy, Countess of Airlie (1933–2024), wife of David Ogilvy, 13th Earl of Airlie. Grandson Joseph Bondurant Ryan (1906–1950) was the developer of the Mont Tremblant ski resort in Quebec. Joseph's son Peter (1940–1962) was the first Canadian to compete in Formula 1 auto racing and the winner of the first Canadian Grand Prix in 1961. Grandson Clendenin J. Ryan Jr. (1905–1957) was an American businessman best known as the publisher and owner of The American Mercury magazine.
