= 167th New York State Legislature =

New York state legislative session

←	166th	168th	→
- New York State Capitol (2009)

Overview
- Legislative body: New York State Legislature
- Jurisdiction: New York, United States
- Term: January 1, 1949 – December 31, 1950

Senate
- Members: 56
- President: Lt. Gov. Joe R. Hanley (R)
- Temporary President: Benjamin F. Feinberg (R), until March 30, 1949; Arthur H. Wicks (R), from March 30, 1949
- Party control: Republican (31–25)

Assembly
- Members: 150
- Speaker: Oswald D. Heck (R)
- Party control: Republican (87–63)

Sessions
- 1st: January 5 – March 31, 1949
- 2nd: January 4 – March 22, 1950

The 167th New York State Legislature, consisting of the New York State Senate and the New York State Assembly, met from January 5, 1949, to March 22, 1950, during the seventh and eighth years of Thomas E. Dewey's governorship, in Albany.

== Background ==
Under the provisions of the New York Constitution of 1938, re-apportioned in 1943, 56 Senators and 150 assemblymen were elected in single-seat districts for two-year terms. The senatorial districts consisted either of one or more entire counties; or a contiguous area within a single county. The counties which were divided into more than one senatorial district were Kings (nine districts), New York (six), Bronx (five), Queens (four), Erie (three), Westchester (three), Monroe (two) and Nassau (two). The Assembly districts consisted either of a single entire county (except Hamilton Co.), or of contiguous area within one county.

At this time there were two major political parties: the Republican Party and the Democratic Party. The Liberal Party and the American Labor Party also nominated tickets.

== Elections ==
The 1948 New York state election was held on November 2. No statewide elective offices were up for election.

Seven of the eight women members of the previous legislature—Assemblywomen Gladys E. Banks (Rep.), of the Bronx; Mary A. Gillen (Dem.), of Brooklyn; Janet Hill Gordon (Rep.), a lawyer of Norwich; Elizabeth Hanniford (Rep.), a statistician of the Bronx; Genesta M. Strong (Rep.), of Plandome Heights; Mildred F. Taylor (Rep.), a coal dealer of Lyons; and Maude E. Ten Eyck (Rep.), of Manhattan—were re-elected.

The 1949 New York state election was held on November 8. Both statewide elective offices up for election were carried by the Democratic/Liberal nominees. The approximate party strength at this election, as expressed by the vote for U.S. Senator, was: Republicans 2,378,000; Democrats 2,149,000; and Liberals 426,000. Two vacancies in the State Senate, and two vacancies in the Assembly were filled.

== Sessions ==
The Legislature met for the first regular session (the 172nd) at the State Capitol in Albany on January 5, 1949; and adjourned in the morning of March 31.

Oswald D. Heck (Rep.) was re-elected Speaker.

Benjamin F. Feinberg (Rep.) was re-elected Temporary President of the State Senate. On March 30, 1949, Feinberg was appointed as Chairman of the New York Public Service Commission, and Arthur H. Wicks (Rep.) was elected Temporary President of the State Senate.

The Legislature met for the second regular session (the 173rd) at the State Capitol in Albany on January 4, 1950; and adjourned on March 22.

== State Senate ==
=== Districts ===
- 1st District: Suffolk County
- 2nd and 3rd District: Parts of Nassau County
- 4th, 5th, 6th and 7th District: Parts of Queens County, i.e. the Borough of Queens
- 8th, 9th, 10th, 11th, 12th, 13th, 14th, 15th and 16th District: Parts of Kings County, i.e. the Borough of Brooklyn
- 17th District: Richmond County, i.e. the Borough of Richmond (now the Borough of Staten Island)
- 18th, 19th, 20th, 21st, 22nd and 23rd District: Parts of New York County, i.e. the Borough of Manhattan
- 24th, 25th, 26th, 27th and 28th District: Parts of Bronx County, i.e. the Borough of the Bronx
- 29th, 30th and 31st District: Parts of Westchester County
- 32nd District: Orange and Rockland counties
- 33rd District: Columbia, Dutchess and Putnam counties
- 34th District: Delaware, Greene, Sullivan and Ulster counties
- 35th District: Albany County
- 36th District: Rensselaer and Saratoga counties
- 37th District: Montgomery and Schenectady counties
- 38th District: Clinton, Essex, Warren and Washington counties
- 39th District: St. Lawrence and Franklin counties
- 40th District: Fulton, Hamilton, Herkimer and Lewis counties
- 41st District: Oneida County
- 42nd District: Jefferson and Oswego counties
- 43rd District: Onondaga County
- 44th District: Chenango, Cortland, Madison, Otsego and Schoharie counties
- 45th District: Broome County
- 46th District: Chemung, Schuyler, Tioga and Tompkins counties
- 47th District: Cayuga, Seneca and Wayne counties
- 48th District: Ontario, Steuben and Yates counties
- 49th District: Allegany, Genesee, Livingston and Wyoming counties
- 50th and 51st District: Parts of Monroe County
- 52nd District: Niagara and Orleans counties
- 53rd, 54th and 55th District: Parts of Erie County
- 56th District: Cattaraugus and Chautauqua counties

=== Senators ===
The asterisk (*) denotes members of the previous Legislature who continued in office as members of this Legislature. Harry Gittleson and Louis Bennett changed from the Assembly to the Senate at the beginning of this Legislature. Assemblyman Henry Neddo was elected to fill a vacancy in the Senate.

Note: For brevity, the chairmanships omit the words "...the Committee on (the)..."

District	Senator	Party	Notes
1st	S. Wentworth Horton*	Republican	
2nd	John D. Bennett*	Republican	
3rd	William S. Hults Jr.*	Republican	
4th	Seymour Halpern*	Republican	
5th	James F. Fitzgerald	Democrat	
6th	Frank D. O'Connor	Democrat	
7th	William N. Conrad	Democrat	
8th	James J. Crawford*	Dem./Lib.	
9th	Harry Gittleson*	Dem./Am. Labor	
10th	Herbert I. Sorin	Dem./Lib.	
11th	Fred G. Moritt*	Dem./Am. Labor	
12th	Samuel L. Greenberg*	Dem./Am. Labor	
13th	John F. Furey	Dem./Lib.	
14th	Mario M. DeOptatis	Dem./Am. Labor	
15th	Louis L. Friedman*	Dem./Lib.	
16th	William Rosenblatt*	Dem./Am. Labor	
17th	John M. Braisted Jr.*	Democrat	
18th	Elmer F. Quinn*	Democrat	Minority Leader
19th	Francis J. Mahoney*	Democrat	
20th	MacNeil Mitchell*	Republican	
21st	Harold I. Panken*	Democrat	
22nd	Alfred E. Santangelo*	Dem./Am. Labor	
23rd	Joseph Zaretzki*	Dem./Lib.	
24th	Sidney A. Fine*	Democrat	on November 7, 1950, elected to the 82nd U.S. Congress
25th	Arthur Wachtel*	Dem./Rep.	
26th	Louis Bennett*	Democrat	resigned on July 22, 1949, to run for the Municipal Court
26th	Nathaniel T. Helman	Democrat	on November 8, 1949, elected to fill vacancy
27th	Paul A. Fino*	Republican	on May 29, 1950, appointed to the Municipal Civil Service Commission
28th	Charles V. Scanlan*	Rep./Dem.	
29th	William F. Condon*	Republican	
30th	J. Raymond McGovern*	Republican	on November 7, 1950, elected New York State Comptroller
31st	Pliny W. Williamson*	Republican	Chairman of Judiciary
32nd	Thomas C. Desmond*	Republican	
33rd	Ernest I. Hatfield*	Republican	
34th	Arthur H. Wicks*	Republican	until March 30, 1949, Chairman of Finance; on March 30, 1949, elected Temporary President
35th	Peter J. Dalessandro*	Democrat	
36th	Gilbert T. Seelye*	Republican	
37th	Thomas F. Campbell*	Republican	
38th	Benjamin F. Feinberg*	Republican	re-elected Temporary President; on March 30, 1949, appointed as Chairman of the New York Public Service Commission
38th	Henry Neddo*	Republican	on November 8, 1949, elected to fill vacancy
39th	Paul D. Graves	Republican	
40th	(Fred A. Young)*	Republican	on January 5, 1949, appointed to the Court of Claims
40th	Walter Van Wiggeren	Republican	on February 8, 1949, elected to fill vacancy
41st	John T. McKennan	Democrat	
42nd	Henry A. Wise*	Republican	Chairman of General Laws (1950)
43rd	John H. Hughes*	Republican	
44th	Walter W. Stokes*	Republican	
45th	Floyd E. Anderson*	Republican	
46th	Chauncey B. Hammond*	Republican	
47th	Henry W. Griffith*	Republican	
48th	Fred S. Hollowell*	Republican	
49th	Austin W. Erwin*	Republican	
50th	George T. Manning*	Republican	
51st	Ray B. Tuttle	Democrat	
52nd	Earl W. Brydges	Republican	
53rd	Walter J. Mahoney*	Republican	Chairman of Finance, from March 30, 1949
54th	Edmund P. Radwan*	Republican	on November 7, 1950, elected to the 82nd U.S. Congress
55th	Benjamin Miller	Democrat	
56th	George H. Pierce*	Republican	Chairman of Affairs of Villages (1950)

=== Employees ===
- Clerk (1949), office renamed Secretary (1950): William S. King

== State Assembly ==
=== Assemblymen ===
Note: For brevity, the chairmanships omit the words "...the Committee on (the)..."

District		Assemblymen	Party	Notes
Albany	1st	D-Cady Herrick 2nd*	Dem./Lib.	
Albany	2nd	George W. Foy*	Dem./Lib.	
Albany	3rd	James F. Dillon	Dem./Lib.	
Allegany		William H. MacKenzie*	Republican	
Bronx	1st	Bernard C. McDonnell*	Dem./Rep.	
Bronx	2nd	Richard M. Goldwater*	Dem./Rep.	
Bronx	3rd	Edward T. Galloway*	Dem./Rep.	
Bronx	4th	A. Joseph Ribustello*	Republican	
Bronx	5th	Joseph A. Martinis*	Democrat	resigned on February 11, 1950, appointed as a City Magistrate
Bronx	6th	Julius J. Gans*	Democrat	
Bronx	7th	Louis Peck*	Democrat	
Bronx	8th	John T. Satriale	Democrat	
Bronx	9th	Elizabeth Hanniford*	Republican	
Bronx	10th	John J. DePasquale*	Republican	
Bronx	11th	Gladys E. Banks*	Republican	
Bronx	12th	Nathan A. Lashin*	Democrat	
Bronx	13th	William J. Drohan*	Republican	
Broome	1st	Richard H. Knauf*	Republican	
Broome	2nd	Orlo M. Brees*	Republican	
Cattaraugus		Leo P. Noonan*	Republican	
Cayuga		Charles A. Cusick*	Republican	
Chautauqua		E. Herman Magnuson*	Republican	
Chemung		Harry J. Tifft*	Republican	
Chenango		Janet Hill Gordon*	Republican	
Clinton		James A. FitzPatrick*	Republican	
Columbia		Willard C. Drumm*	Republican	
Cortland		Harold L. Creal*	Republican	
Delaware		Elmer J. Kellam*	Republican	
Dutchess		Robert Watson Pomeroy*	Republican	
Erie	1st	Leonard S. Capizzi	Democrat	
Erie	2nd	Justin C. Morgan*	Republican	Chairman of Judiciary from July 7, 1950
Erie	3rd	William J. Butler*	Republican	
Erie	4th	Frank J. Caffery	Democrat	
Erie	5th	Philip V. Baczkowski*	Democrat	
Erie	6th	George F. Dannebrock*	Republican	
Erie	7th	Julius Volker*	Republican	
Erie	8th	John R. Pillion*	Republican	
Essex		L. Judson Morhouse*	Republican	
Franklin		William L. Doige*	Republican	
Fulton and Hamilton		Joseph R. Younglove*	Republican	
Genesee		John E. Johnson*	Republican	
Greene		William E. Brady*	Republican	
Herkimer		Leo A. Lawrence*	Republican	
Jefferson		Orin S. Wilcox*	Republican	
Kings	1st	Max M. Turshen*	Democrat	
Kings	2nd	J. Sidney Levine*	Democrat	
Kings	3rd	Mary A. Gillen*	Democrat	
Kings	4th	Bernard Austin*	Democrat	
Kings	5th	Harry Morr	Democrat	
Kings	6th	John J. Ryan*	Democrat	
Kings	7th	Louis Kalish*	Democrat	
Kings	8th	Arthur A. Low	Democrat	resigned on August 31, 1949, to run for the New York City Council
Kings	8th	Frank Composto	Dem./Lib.	on November 8, 1949, elected to fill vacancy
Kings	9th	Frank J. McMullen*	Republican	
Kings	10th	Lewis W. Olliffe*	Republican	
Kings	11th	Eugene F. Bannigan*	Democrat	
Kings	12th	James W. Feely	Democrat	
Kings	13th	Lawrence P. Murphy*	Democrat	
Kings	14th	Edward S. Lentol	Democrat	
Kings	15th	John Smolenski*	Democrat	
Kings	16th	Frank J. Pino*	Democrat	
Kings	17th	Bertram L. Baker	Democrat	
Kings	18th	Irwin Steingut*	Democrat	Minority Leader
Kings	19th	Philip J. Schupler*	Democrat	
Kings	20th	Joseph R. Corso	Democrat	
Kings	21st	Thomas A. Dwyer*	Democrat	
Kings	22nd	Anthony J. Travia	Democrat	
Kings	23rd	Alfred A. Lama*	Democrat	
Kings	24th	Ben Werbel	Democrat	
Lewis		Benjamin H. Demo*	Republican	
Livingston		Joseph W. Ward*	Republican	
Madison		Wheeler Milmoe*	Republican	
Monroe	1st	J. Eugene Goddard	Republican	
Monroe	2nd	A. Gould Hatch	Republican	
Monroe	3rd	Raymond H. Combs*	Republican	
Monroe	4th	Charles F. Stockmeister	Democrat	
Montgomery		John F. Bennison*	Republican	
Nassau	1st	Frank J. Becker*	Republican	
Nassau	2nd	Joseph F. Carlino*	Republican	
Nassau	3rd	Genesta M. Strong*	Republican	
Nassau	4th	David S. Hill Jr.*	Republican	
New York	1st	Maude E. Ten Eyck*	Republican	
New York	2nd	Louis DeSalvio*	Democrat	
New York	3rd	Owen McGivern*	Democrat	
New York	4th	Leonard Farbstein*	Democrat	
New York	5th	vacant	Irwin D. Davidson (D) was re-elected, but resigned on December 31, 1948	
New York	5th	Monroe Flegenheimer	Dem./Lib.	on February 15, 1949, elected to fill vacancy
New York	6th	Francis X. McGowan*	Democrat	
New York	7th	James T. McNamara	Democrat	
New York	8th	Archibald Douglas Jr.*	Republican	
New York	9th	John R. Brook*	Republican	
New York	10th	Herman Katz	Democrat	
New York	11th	Thomas Dickens	Democrat	
New York	12th	Elijah Crump	Democrat	
New York	13th	Harold A. Stevens*	Democrat	on November 7, 1950, elected to the Court of General Sessions
New York	14th	Hulan E. Jack*	Democrat	
New York	15th	Samuel Roman*	Republican	
New York	16th	Louis A. Cioffi*	Democrat	
Niagara	1st	Jacob E. Hollinger*	Republican	
Niagara	2nd	Ernest Curto*	Republican	
Oneida	1st	Ira Francis Domser	Democrat	
Oneida	2nd	Jeremiah J. Ashcroft	Democrat	
Onondaga	1st	Searles G. Shultz*	Republican	
Onondaga	2nd	Donald H. Mead	Republican	
Onondaga	3rd	Lawrence M. Rulison*	Republican	
Ontario		Harry R. Marble*	Republican	
Orange	1st	Lee B. Mailler*	Republican	Majority Leader
Orange	2nd	Wilson C. Van Duzer*	Republican	
Orleans		Alonzo L. Waters	Republican	
Oswego		Henry D. Coville*	Republican	
Otsego		Paul L. Talbot*	Republican	
Putnam		D. Mallory Stephens*	Republican	Chairman of Ways and Means
Queens	1st	Alexander Del Giorno*	Democrat	
Queens	2nd	William E. Clancy*	Democrat	
Queens	3rd	Anthony R. Carus	Democrat	
Queens	4th	Thomas A. Duffy	Democrat	
Queens	5th	William G. Giaccio	Democrat	
Queens	6th	William F. Bowe	Democrat	
Queens	7th	Anthony P. Savarese Jr.	Republican	
Queens	8th	Samuel Rabin*	Republican	
Queens	9th	Fred W. Preller*	Republican	
Queens	10th	Angelo Graci*	Republican	
Queens	11th	Thomas Fitzpatrick	Democrat	
Queens	12th	J. Lewis Fox	Democrat	
Rensselaer		Thomas H. Brown	Republican	
Richmond	1st	William N. Reidy	Democrat	
Richmond	2nd	Edward V. Curry	Democrat	
Rockland		Robert Walmsley*	Republican	
St. Lawrence		Allan P. Sill*	Republican	
Saratoga		John L. Ostrander*	Republican	
Schenectady		Oswald D. Heck*	Republican	re-elected Speaker
Schoharie		Sharon J. Mauhs	Dem./Lib.	
Schuyler		Jerry W. Black*	Republican	
Seneca		Lawrence W. Van Cleef*	Republican	
Steuben		William M. Stuart*	Republican	
Suffolk	1st	Edmund R. Lupton*	Republican	
Suffolk	2nd	Elisha T. Barrett*	Republican	
Sullivan		James G. Lyons*	Democrat	
Tioga		Myron D. Albro*	Republican	
Tompkins		Ray S. Ashbery	Republican	
Ulster		John F. Wadlin*	Republican	
Warren		Harry A. Reoux*	Republican	Chairman of Judiciary; resigned in June 1950 to become Counsel to the Joint Legislative Committee on Re-Apportionment
Washington		Henry Neddo*	Republican	resigned to run for the State Senate
Washington		William J. Reid	Republican	on November 8, 1949, elected to fill vacancy
Wayne		Mildred F. Taylor*	Republican	
Westchester	1st	Malcolm Wilson*	Republican	
Westchester	2nd	Fred A. Graber*	Republican	died on March 22, 1950
Westchester	3rd	Harold D. Toomey*	Republican	
Westchester	4th	Frank S. McCullough*	Republican	
Westchester	5th	Samuel Faile	Republican	
Westchester	6th	Theodore Hill Jr.*	Republican	
Wyoming		Harold C. Ostertag*	Republican	on November 7, 1950, elected to the 82nd U.S. Congress
Yates		Vernon W. Blodgett*	Republican	

=== Employees ===
- Clerk: Ansley B. Borkowski
- Sergeant-at-Arms: Joseph C. Williams

== Sources ==
- Your Representatives in Merit (Winter 1948, Vol. 17, No. 4, pg. 118f)
- Members of the New York Senate (1940s) at Political Graveyard
- Members of the New York Assembly (1940s) at Political Graveyard
