= 166th New York State Legislature =

New York state legislative session

| ← | 165th | 167th | → |
- New York State Capitol (2009)

Overview
- Legislative body: New York State Legislature
- Jurisdiction: New York, United States
- Term: January 1, 1947 – December 31, 1948

Senate
- Members: 56
- President: Lt. Gov. Joe R. Hanley (R)
- Temporary President: Benjamin F. Feinberg (R)
- Party control: Republican; 1947: (41–14–1); 1948: (40–15–1)

Assembly
- Members: 150
- Speaker: Oswald D. Heck (R)
- Party control: Republican; 1947: (109–40–1); 1948: (107–42–1)

Sessions
- 1st: January 8 – March 18, 1947
- 2nd: January 7 – March 13, 1948

The 166th New York State Legislature, consisting of the New York State Senate and the New York State Assembly, met from January 8, 1947, to March 13, 1948, during the fifth and sixth years of Thomas E. Dewey's governorship, in Albany.

== Background ==
Under the provisions of the New York Constitution of 1938, re-apportioned in 1943, 56 Senators and 150 assemblymen were elected in single-seat districts for two-year terms. The senatorial districts consisted either of one or more entire counties; or a contiguous area within a single county. The counties which were divided into more than one senatorial district were Kings (nine districts), New York (six), Bronx (five), Queens (four), Erie (three), Westchester (three), Monroe (two) and Nassau (two). The Assembly districts consisted either of a single entire county (except Hamilton Co.), or of contiguous area within one county.

At this time there were two major political parties: the Republican Party and the Democratic Party. The American Labor Party, the Liberal Party and the Communist Party also nominated tickets.

== Elections ==
The 1946 New York state election was held on November 5. Governor Thomas E. Dewey and Lieutenant Governor Joe R. Hanley were re-elected, both Republicans. The other five statewide elective offices up for election were carried by four Republicans, and the Democratic Chief Judge with Republican, American Labor and Liberal endorsement. The approximate party strength at this election, as expressed by the vote for Governor, was: Republicans 2,826,000; Democrats 1,532,000; American Labor 429,000; Liberals 177,000; and Communists 90,000.

All four women members of the previous legislature—State Senator Rhoda Fox Graves (Rep.), of Gouverneur; and Assemblywomen Mary A. Gillen (Dem.), of Brooklyn; Gladys E. Banks (Rep.), of the Bronx; and Genesta M. Strong (Rep.), of Plandome Heights—were re-elected. Janet Hill Gordon (Rep.), a lawyer of Norwich; Elizabeth Hanniford (Rep.), a statistician of the Bronx; Mildred F. Taylor (Rep.), a coal dealer of Lyons; and Maude E. Ten Eyck (Rep.), of Manhattan; were also elected to the Assembly.

The 1947 New York state election was held on November 4. No statewide elective offices were up for election. Four vacancies in the State Senate, and four vacancies in the Assembly were filled.

== Sessions ==
The Legislature met for the first regular session (the 170th) at the State Capitol in Albany on January 8, 1947; and adjourned on March 18.

Oswald D. Heck (Rep.) was re-elected Speaker.

Benjamin F. Feinberg (Rep.) was re-elected Temporary President of the State Senate.

The Legislature met for the second regular session (the 171st) at the State Capitol in Albany on January 7, 1948; and adjourned on March 13.

== State Senate ==
=== Districts ===
- 1st District: Suffolk County
- 2nd and 3rd District: Parts of Nassau County
- 4th, 5th, 6th and 7th District: Parts of Queens County, i.e. the Borough of Queens
- 8th, 9th, 10th, 11th, 12th, 13th, 14th, 15th and 16th District: Parts of Kings County, i.e. the Borough of Brooklyn
- 17th District: Richmond County, i.e. the Borough of Richmond (now the Borough of Staten Island)
- 18th, 19th, 20th, 21st, 22nd and 23rd District: Parts of New York County, i.e. the Borough of Manhattan
- 24th, 25th, 26th, 27th and 28th District: Parts of Bronx County, i.e. the Borough of the Bronx
- 29th, 30th and 31st District: Parts of Westchester County
- 32nd District: Orange and Rockland counties
- 33rd District: Columbia, Dutchess and Putnam counties
- 34th District: Delaware, Greene, Sullivan and Ulster counties
- 35th District: Albany County
- 36th District: Rensselaer and Saratoga counties
- 37th District: Montgomery and Schenectady counties
- 38th District: Clinton, Essex, Warren and Washington counties
- 39th District: St. Lawrence and Franklin counties
- 40th District: Fulton, Hamilton, Herkimer and Lewis counties
- 41st District: Oneida County
- 42nd District: Jefferson and Oswego counties
- 43rd District: Onondaga County
- 44th District: Chenango, Cortland, Madison, Otsego and Schoharie counties
- 45th District: Broome County
- 46th District: Chemung, Schuyler, Tioga and Tompkins counties
- 47th District: Cayuga, Seneca and Wayne counties
- 48th District: Ontario, Steuben and Yates counties
- 49th District: Allegany, Genesee, Livingston and Wyoming counties
- 50th and 51st District: Parts of Monroe County
- 52nd District: Niagara and Orleans counties
- 53rd, 54th and 55th District: Parts of Erie County
- 56th District: Cattaraugus and Chautauqua counties

=== Members ===
The asterisk (*) denotes members of the previous Legislature who continued in office as members of this Legislature. MacNeil Mitchell, Sidney A. Fine and George T. Manning changed from the Assembly to the Senate at the beginning of this Legislature. Assemblyman Ernest I. Hatfield was elected to fill a vacancy in the Senate.

Note: For brevity, the chairmanships omit the words "...the Committee on (the)..."

| District | Senator | Party | Notes |
|---|---|---|---|
| 1st | S. Wentworth Horton | Republican | |
| 2nd | John D. Bennett* | Republican | |
| 3rd | William S. Hults Jr.* | Republican | |
| 4th | Seymour Halpern* | Republican | |
| 5th | Frederic E. Hammer* | Republican | |
| 6th | Charles T. Corey | Republican | |
| 7th | Irwin Pakula | Republican | |
| 8th | James J. Crawford* | Dem./Lib. | |
| 9th | Richard McCleery | Republican | |
| 10th | Kenneth Sherbell | Am. Labor/Rep. | |
| 11th | Fred G. Moritt* | Dem./Am. Labor | |
| 12th | Samuel L. Greenberg* | Dem./Am. Labor | |
| 13th | C. Corey Mills | Rep./Am. Labor | |
| 14th | Joseph E. Parisi* | Rep./Am. Labor | |
| 15th | Louis L. Friedman* | Democrat | |
| 16th | William Rosenblatt* | Democrat | |
| 17th | Robert E. Johnson | Republican | in August 1947, appointed as D.A. of Richmond Co. |
| 17th | John M. Braisted Jr. | Democrat | on November 4, 1947, elected to fill vacancy |
| 18th | Elmer F. Quinn* | Dem./Am. Labor | Minority Leader |
| 19th | Francis J. Mahoney* | Dem./Am. labor | |
| 20th | MacNeil Mitchell* | Republican | |
| 21st | Harold I. Panken | Democrat | |
| 22nd | Alfred E. Santangelo | Democrat | |
| 23rd | Alexander A. Falk* | Democrat | in May 1947, appointed to the New York Civil Service Commission |
| 23rd | Joseph Zaretzki | Democrat | on November 4, 1947, elected to fill vacancy |
| 24th | Sidney A. Fine* | Democrat | |
| 25th | Arthur Wachtel* | Democrat | |
| 26th | Isidore Dollinger* | Democrat | on November 2, 1948, elected to the 81st U.S. Congress |
| 27th | Paul A. Fino* | Republican | |
| 28th | Charles V. Scanlan | Republican | |
| 29th | William F. Condon* | Republican | |
| 30th | J. Raymond McGovern* | Republican | |
| 31st | Pliny W. Williamson* | Republican | Chairman of Judiciary |
| 32nd | Thomas C. Desmond* | Republican | Chairman of Affairs of Cities |
| 33rd | Frederic H. Bontecou* | Republican | on May 9, 1947, tendered his resignation, effective June 1 |
| 33rd | Ernest I. Hatfield* | Republican | on November 4, 1947, elected to fill vacancy |
| 34th | Arthur H. Wicks* | Republican | Chairman of Finance |
| 35th | Peter J. Dalessandro | Democrat | |
| 36th | Gilbert T. Seelye* | Republican | |
| 37th | Thomas F. Campbell* | Republican | |
| 38th | Benjamin F. Feinberg* | Republican | re-elected Temporary President |
| 39th | Rhoda Fox Graves* | Republican | |
| 40th | Fred A. Young* | Republican | |
| 41st | Robert C. Groben | Republican | |
| 42nd | Isaac B. Mitchell* | Republican | Chairman of Internal Affairs; resigned on June 12, 1947 |
| 42nd | Henry A. Wise | Republican | on November 4, 1947, elected to fill vacancy |
| 43rd | John H. Hughes | Republican | |
| 44th | Walter W. Stokes* | Republican | Chairman of Conservation |
| 45th | Floyd E. Anderson* | Republican | |
| 46th | Chauncey B. Hammond* | Republican | |
| 47th | Henry W. Griffith* | Republican | |
| 48th | Fred S. Hollowell* | Republican | |
| 49th | Austin W. Erwin* | Republican | |
| 50th | George T. Manning | Republican | |
| 51st | Allen J. Oliver* | Republican | Chairman of Aviation |
| 52nd | William Bewley* | Republican | |
| 53rd | Walter J. Mahoney* | Republican | |
| 54th | Edmund P. Radwan* | Republican | |
| 55th | Charles O. Burney Jr.* | Republican | |
| 56th | George H. Pierce* | Republican | |

=== Employees ===
- Clerk: William S. King
- Sergeant-at-Arms: Harold W. Cole

== State Assembly ==
=== Assemblymen ===
Note: For brevity, the chairmanships omit the words "...the Committee on (the)..."

| District | | Assemblymen | Party | Notes |
|---|---|---|---|---|
| Albany | 1st | D-Cady Herrick 2nd | Democrat | |
| Albany | 2nd | George W. Foy* | Democrat | |
| Albany | 3rd | John McBain | Republican | |
| Allegany | | William H. MacKenzie* | Republican | |
| Bronx | 1st | Patrick J. Fogarty* | Democrat | on October 28, 1947, appointed to the Domestic Relations Court |
| Bronx | 1st | Bernard C. McDonnell | Democrat | on February 17, 1948, elected to fill vacancy |
| Bronx | 2nd | Richard M. Goldwater | Democrat | |
| Bronx | 3rd | Edward T. Galloway* | Democrat | |
| Bronx | 4th | A. Joseph Ribustello | Republican | |
| Bronx | 5th | Joseph A. Martinis | Democrat | |
| Bronx | 6th | Julius J. Gans* | Democrat | |
| Bronx | 7th | Louis Peck* | Democrat | |
| Bronx | 8th | Louis Bennett* | Democrat | |
| Bronx | 9th | Elizabeth Hanniford | Republican | |
| Bronx | 10th | John J. DePasquale* | Republican | |
| Bronx | 11th | Gladys E. Banks* | Republican | |
| Bronx | 12th | Nathan A. Lashin* | Democrat | |
| Bronx | 13th | William J. Drohan | Republican | |
| Broome | 1st | Richard H. Knauf* | Republican | |
| Broome | 2nd | Orlo M. Brees* | Republican | |
| Cattaraugus | | Leo P. Noonan* | Republican | |
| Cayuga | | Charles A. Cusick | Republican | |
| Chautauqua | | E. Herman Magnuson* | Republican | |
| Chemung | | Harry J. Tifft* | Republican | |
| Chenango | | Janet Hill Gordon | Republican | |
| Clinton | | James A. FitzPatrick | Republican | |
| Columbia | | Willard C. Drumm | Republican | |
| Cortland | | Harold L. Creal* | Republican | |
| Delaware | | Elmer J. Kellam* | Republican | |
| Dutchess | | Ernest I. Hatfield* | Republican | on June 18, 1947, resigned to run for the State Senate |
| Dutchess | | Robert Watson Pomeroy | Republican | on November 4, 1947, elected to fill vacancy |
| Erie | 1st | Frank A. Gugino* | Republican | |
| Erie | 2nd | Justin C. Morgan* | Republican | |
| Erie | 3rd | William J. Butler* | Republican | |
| Erie | 4th | Gerald F. Sullivan | Republican | |
| Erie | 5th | Philip V. Baczkowski* | Democrat | |
| Erie | 6th | George F. Dannebrock* | Republican | |
| Erie | 7th | Julius Volker* | Republican | |
| Erie | 8th | John R. Pillion* | Republican | |
| Essex | | L. Judson Morhouse* | Republican | |
| Franklin | | William L. Doige* | Republican | |
| Fulton and Hamilton | | Joseph R. Younglove* | Republican | |
| Genesee | | John E. Johnson | Republican | |
| Greene | | William E. Brady* | Republican | |
| Herkimer | | Leo A. Lawrence* | Republican | |
| Jefferson | | Orin S. Wilcox* | Republican | |
| Kings | 1st | Max M. Turshen* | Democrat | |
| Kings | 2nd | J. Sidney Levine* | Democrat | |
| Kings | 3rd | Mary A. Gillen* | Democrat | |
| Kings | 4th | Bernard Austin* | Democrat | |
| Kings | 5th | Seymour Brener | Republican | |
| Kings | 6th | Robert J. Crews* | Republican | resigned |
| Kings | 6th | John J. Ryan | Democrat | on November 4, 1947, elected to fill vacancy |
| Kings | 7th | Louis Kalish | Democrat | |
| Kings | 8th | Thomas A. Carney | Republican | |
| Kings | 9th | Frank J. McMullen* | Republican | |
| Kings | 10th | Lewis W. Olliffe* | Republican | |
| Kings | 11th | Eugene F. Bannigan* | Democrat | |
| Kings | 12th | Frank P. Davern | Republican | |
| Kings | 13th | Lawrence P. Murphy* | Democrat | |
| Kings | 14th | Harry Gittleson* | Democrat | |
| Kings | 15th | John Smolenski* | Democrat | |
| Kings | 16th | Frank J. Pino* | Democrat | |
| Kings | 17th | John J. Walsh* | Democrat | |
| Kings | 18th | Irwin Steingut* | Democrat | Minority Leader |
| Kings | 19th | Philip J. Schupler* | Democrat | |
| Kings | 20th | John E. Beck* | Republican | |
| Kings | 21st | Thomas A. Dwyer* | Democrat | |
| Kings | 22nd | Joseph Soviero | Republican | |
| Kings | 23rd | Alfred A. Lama* | Democrat | |
| Kings | 24th | Samuel Kaplan | Am. Labor | |
| Lewis | | Benjamin H. Demo* | Republican | |
| Livingston | | Joseph W. Ward* | Republican | |
| Madison | | Wheeler Milmoe* | Republican | |
| Monroe | 1st | Joseph W. Bentley | Republican | |
| Monroe | 2nd | Abraham Schulman* | Republican | |
| Monroe | 3rd | Raymond H. Combs | Republican | |
| Monroe | 4th | Thomas F. Riley* | Republican | |
| Montgomery | | John F. Bennison* | Republican | |
| Nassau | 1st | Frank J. Becker* | Republican | |
| Nassau | 2nd | Joseph F. Carlino* | Republican | |
| Nassau | 3rd | Genesta M. Strong* | Republican | |
| Nassau | 4th | David S. Hill Jr.* | Republican | |
| New York | 1st | Maude E. Ten Eyck | Republican | |
| New York | 2nd | Louis DeSalvio* | Democrat | |
| New York | 3rd | Owen McGivern* | Democrat | |
| New York | 4th | Leonard Farbstein* | Democrat | |
| New York | 5th | Irwin D. Davidson* | Democrat | |
| New York | 6th | Francis X. McGowan* | Democrat | |
| New York | 7th | Howard Henig | Republican | |
| New York | 8th | Archibald Douglas Jr.* | Republican | |
| New York | 9th | John R. Brook* | Republican | |
| New York | 10th | John P. Morrissey* | Democrat | |
| New York | 11th | William E. Prince* | Democrat | |
| New York | 12th | William T. Andrews* | Democrat | |
| New York | 13th | Harold A. Stevens | Democrat | |
| New York | 14th | Hulan E. Jack* | Democrat | |
| New York | 15th | Samuel Roman | Republican | |
| New York | 16th | Louis A. Cioffi | Democrat | |
| Niagara | 1st | Jacob E. Hollinger* | Republican | |
| Niagara | 2nd | Ernest Curto* | Republican | |
| Oneida | 1st | Harlow E. Bacon* | Republican | |
| Oneida | 2nd | Richard R. Griffith | Republican | |
| Onondaga | 1st | Searles G. Shultz | Republican | |
| Onondaga | 2nd | Clellan S. Forsythe* | Republican | |
| Onondaga | 3rd | Lawrence M. Rulison* | Republican | |
| Ontario | | Harry R. Marble* | Republican | |
| Orange | 1st | Lee B. Mailler* | Republican | Majority Leader |
| Orange | 2nd | Wilson C. Van Duzer* | Republican | |
| Orleans | | John S. Thompson* | Republican | |
| Oswego | | Henry D. Coville* | Republican | |
| Otsego | | Paul L. Talbot* | Republican | |
| Putnam | | D. Mallory Stephens* | Republican | Chairman of Ways and Means |
| Queens | 1st | Alexander Del Giorno* | Democrat | |
| Queens | 2nd | William E. Clancy* | Democrat | |
| Queens | 3rd | Joseph H. Brinster* | Republican | |
| Queens | 4th | George T. Clark | Republican | |
| Queens | 5th | Thomas F. Hurley* | Republican | |
| Queens | 6th | Meyer Wilen | Republican | |
| Queens | 7th | George Archinal* | Republican | resigned on July 31, 1947, and was appointed as Deputy; Chief Clerk of the Surrogate's Court of Queens County |
| Queens | 7th | George P. Stier | Dem./A.L./Lib. | on November 4, 1947, elected to fill vacancy |
| Queens | 8th | Samuel Rabin* | Republican | |
| Queens | 9th | Fred W. Preller* | Republican | |
| Queens | 10th | Angelo Graci* | Republican | |
| Queens | 11th | Sidney Paymer | Republican | |
| Queens | 12th | Henry Schneider Jr. | Republican | |
| Rensselaer | | John S. Finch* | Republican | |
| Richmond | 1st | Arthur T. Berge* | Republican | |
| Richmond | 2nd | Edmund P. Radigan* | Republican | |
| Rockland | | Robert Walmsley* | Republican | |
| St. Lawrence | | Allan P. Sill* | Republican | |
| Saratoga | | John L. Ostrander* | Republican | |
| Schenectady | | Oswald D. Heck* | Republican | re-elected Speaker |
| Schoharie | | Arthur L. Parsons* | Republican | |
| Schuyler | | Jerry W. Black* | Republican | |
| Seneca | | Lawrence W. Van Cleef* | Republican | |
| Steuben | | William M. Stuart* | Republican | |
| Suffolk | 1st | Edmund R. Lupton* | Republican | |
| Suffolk | 2nd | Elisha T. Barrett* | Republican | |
| Sullivan | | James G. Lyons* | Democrat | |
| Tioga | | Myron D. Albro* | Republican | |
| Tompkins | | Stanley C. Shaw* | Republican | |
| Ulster | | John F. Wadlin* | Republican | |
| Warren | | Harry A. Reoux* | Republican | Chairman of Judiciary |
| Washington | | Henry Neddo* | Republican | |
| Wayne | | Mildred F. Taylor | Republican | |
| Westchester | 1st | Malcolm Wilson* | Republican | |
| Westchester | 2nd | Fred A. Graber* | Republican | |
| Westchester | 3rd | P. Raymond Sirignano* | Republican | resigned to run for City Judge of Mount Vernon |
| Westchester | 3rd | Harold D. Toomey | Republican | on November 4, 1947, elected to fill vacancy |
| Westchester | 4th | Frank S. McCullough* | Republican | |
| Westchester | 5th | Christopher H. Lawrence* | Republican | |
| Westchester | 6th | Theodore Hill Jr.* | Republican | |
| Wyoming | | Harold C. Ostertag* | Republican | |
| Yates | | Vernon W. Blodgett* | Republican | |

=== Employees ===
- Clerk: Ansley B. Borkowski

== Sources ==
- Know Your Legislators in The State Employee (January 1947, Vol. 16, No. 1, pg. 16f and 23)
- Members of the New York Senate (1940s) at Political Graveyard
- Members of the New York Assembly (1940s) at Political Graveyard
