= Eugene F. Bannigan =

American lawyer and politician

Eugene F. Bannigan (December 16, 1911 – July 4, 1958) was an American lawyer and politician from New York.

== Life ==
He was born on December 16, 1911, in Brooklyn, New York City. He attended St. Theresa's Parochial School and Xavier High School. He graduated from Manhattan College and St. John's University School of Law. He was admitted to the bar, practiced law in Brooklyn, and entered politics as a Democrat.

Bannigan was a member of the New York State Assembly from 1941 until his death in 1958, sitting in the 163rd, 164th, 165th, 166th, 167th, 168th, 169th, 170th and 171st New York State Legislatures. He was Minority Leader from 1953 to 1958.

He died on July 4, 1958, of heart disease.

== Sources ==
New York State Assembly
Preceded by Bernard J. Moran	New York State Assembly; Kings County, 11th District; 1941–1958	Succeeded by George A. Cincotta
Preceded by Irwin Steingut	Minority Leader in the New York State Assembly; 1953–1958	Succeeded by Anthony J. Travia
