= E. Herman Magnuson =

American politician

Earnest Herman Magnuson (October 9, 1894 – July 15, 1955) was an American politician from New York.

== Life ==
He was born on October 9, 1894, in Halmstad, Sweden. The family emigrated to the United States in 1901, and settled in Wilcox, Pennsylvania. In 1907, they removed to Jamestown, Chautauqua County, New York. He engaged in the insurance business and entered politics as a Republican.

Magnuson was a member of the New York State Assembly from 1941 until his death in 1955, sitting in the 163rd, 164th, 165th, 166th, 167th, 168th, 169th and 170th New York State Legislatures.

He died suddenly on July 15, 1955, while on vacation in Visby, Gotland, Sweden; and was buried at the Lake View Cemetery in Jamestown.

== Sources ==
New York State Assembly
Preceded by Lloyd J. Babcock	New York State Assembly; Chautauqua County, 1st District; 1941–1944	Succeeded by district abolished
Preceded by new district	New York State Assembly; Chautauqua County; 1945–1955	Succeeded by A. Bruce Manley
