= Thomas C. Desmond =

American politician

Thomas Charles Desmond
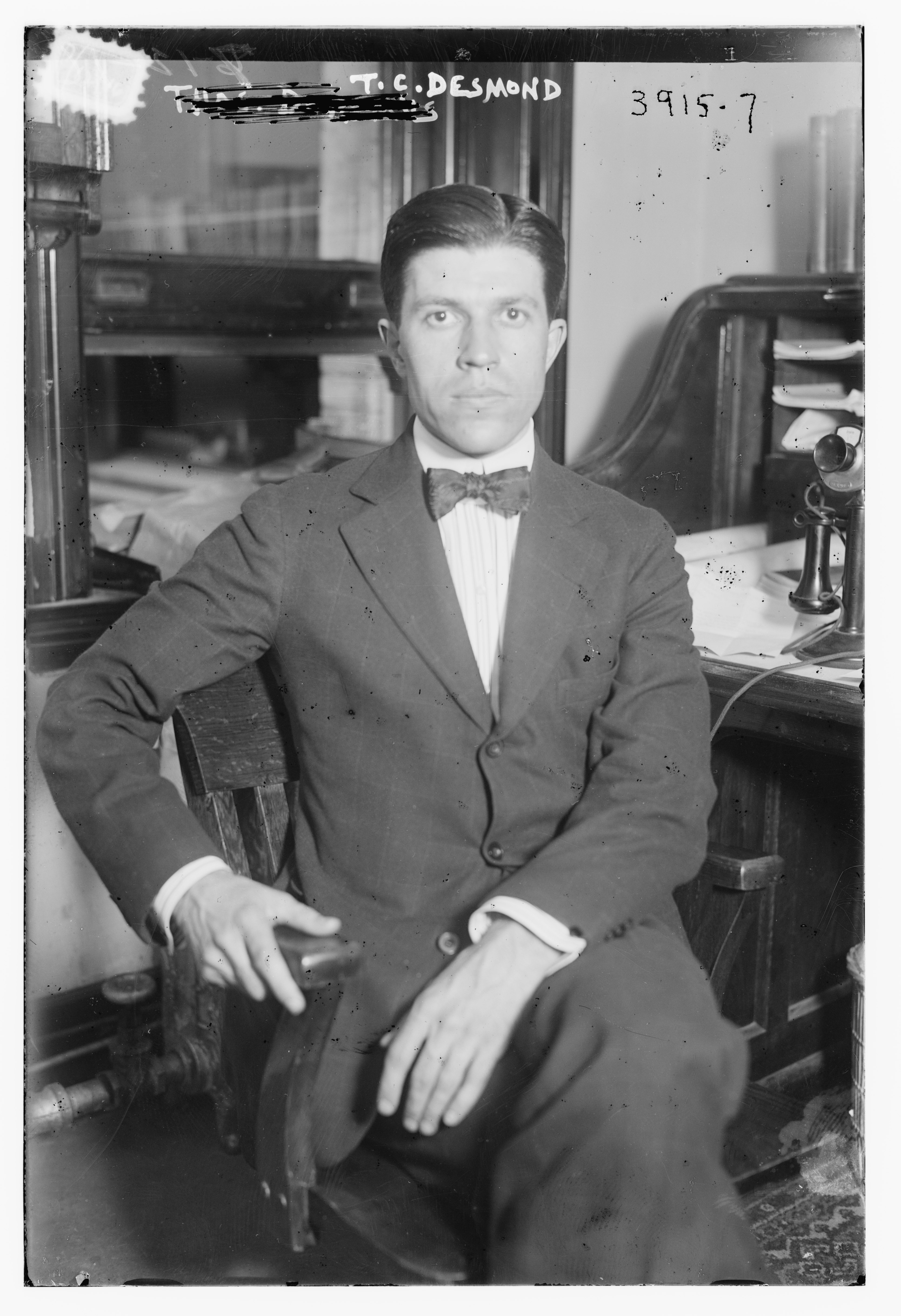
- Desmond c. 1915

Member of the New York Senate from the 27th district
- In office 1931–1944
- Preceded by: Caleb H. Baumes
- Succeeded by: Paul A. Fino

Member of the New York Senate from the 32nd district
- In office 1945–1954
- Preceded by: Gilbert T. Seelye
- Succeeded by: William F. Condon

Member of the New York Senate from the 33rd district
- In office 1955–1958
- Preceded by: Ernest I. Hatfield
- Succeeded by: D. Clinton Dominick III

Personal details
- Born: September 15, 1887 Middletown, New York, U.S.
- Died: October 6, 1972 (aged 85) Boston, Massachusetts, U.S.
- Party: Republican

Thomas Charles Desmond (September 15, 1887 – October 6, 1972) was an American engineer and politician from New York.

== Early life ==
He was born on September 15, 1887, in Middletown, Orange County, New York. He was the son of Thomas Henry Desmond and Katharine (née Safried) Desmond. He graduated from Harvard University in 1908, and from the Massachusetts Institute of Technology in 1909.

== Career ==
He was president and chief engineer of the Newburgh Ship Yards in Newburgh, New York, which built ships for the United States Navy, among them in 1918 the USS Newburgh.

He was President of The New York Young Republican Club; and a delegate to the 1928 and 1940 Republican National Conventions. Desmond was a member of the New York State Senate from 1931 to 1958, sitting in the 154th, 155th, 156th, 157th, 158th, 159th, 160th, 161st, 162nd, 163rd, 164th, 165th, 166th, 167th, 168th, 169th, 170th and 171st New York State Legislatures; and was chairman of the Committee on Public Printing in 1931, and of the Committee on Military Affairs in 1932.

== Personal life ==
On August 16, 1923, he married Alice B. Curtis, an author of biographies, and travel and children's books. They had no children. In 1976, Alice Curtis Desmond (1897–1990) married Hamilton Fish III (1888–1991).

He was a life member of the MIT Corporation, and died on October 6, 1972, in Boston, Massachusetts, while on a visit to the MIT.

New York State Senate
Preceded by Caleb H. Baumes	New York State Senate; 27th District; 1931–1944	Succeeded by Paul A. Fino
Preceded by Gilbert T. Seelye	New York State Senate; 32nd District; 1945–1954	Succeeded by William F. Condon
Preceded by Ernest I. Hatfield	New York State Senate; 33rd District; 1955–1958	Succeeded by D. Clinton Dominick III
