= Fred A. Graber =

American businessman and politician

Member of the New York State Assembly from the Westchester County 2nd district
- In office January 1, 1945 – March 22, 1950
- Preceded by: Theodore Hill Jr.
- Succeeded by: Edward H. Innet

Mayor of Tarrytown, New York
- In office 1941–1944

Personal details
- Born: January 4, 1895 New York City, U.S.
- Died: March 22, 1950 (aged 55) Albany, New York, U.S.
- Spouse: Mildred Ruth McBride (m. 1917)
- Children: 1
- Occupation: Politician, businessman

Military service
- Allegiance: United States
- Branch/service: United States Army

Fred A. Graber (January 4, 1895 – March 22, 1950) was an American businessman and politician from New York.

== Life ==
He was born on January 4, 1895, in New York City, the son of Fred A. Graber and Elizabeth (Kaiser) Graber (died 1950). The family removed to Irvington, Westchester County, New York in 1900, and he attended the public school and high school there. From 1912 to 1922, he worked for the New York Central Railroad as a clerk in the freight audit office. On July 30, 1917, he married Mildred Ruth McBride, and their only child was Fred A. Graber Jr. During World War I he served in the U.S. Army. In 1922, he became a partner in an ice-cream wholesale and retail business in Tarrytown.

He was a trustee of Tarrytown from 1933 to 1940; Mayor of Tarrytown from 1941 to 1944; and a member of the New York State Assembly (Westchester Co., 2nd D.) from 1945 until his death in 1950, sitting in the 165th, 166th and 167th New York State Legislatures.

He was found dead in the morning of March 22, 1950, the last day of the annual legislative session, in his bed at the DeWitt Clinton Hotel in Albany, New York. He had died during the night of a heart attack.

New York State Assembly
Preceded by Theodore Hill, Jr.	New York State Assembly; Westchester County, 2nd District; 1945–1950	Succeeded by Edward H. Innet
