= Paul A. Fino =

American lawyer and politician

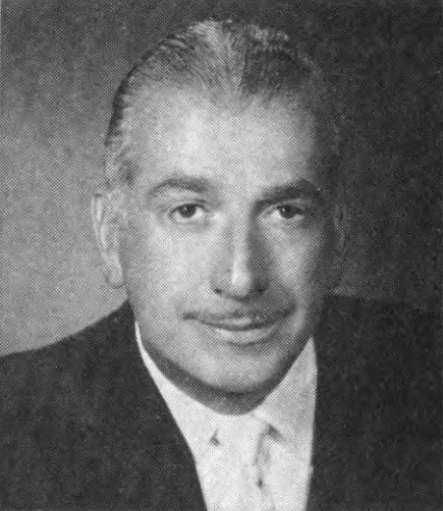

Member of the New York State Senate from the 27th district
- In office January 1, 1945 – December 31, 1950
- Preceded by: Thomas C. Desmond
- Succeeded by: Enzo Gaspari

Member of the U.S. House of Representatives from New York
- In office January 3, 1953 – December 31, 1968
- Preceded by: Charles A. Buckley
- Succeeded by: Mario Biaggi
- Constituency: 25th district (1953–63); 24th district (1963–68)

Justice of the New York Supreme Court
- In office January 1, 1969 – December 31, 1972

Personal details
- Born: Paul Albert Fino; December 15, 1913 New York City, U.S.
- Died: June 16, 2009 (aged 95)
- Resting place: Woodlawn Cemetery
- Party: Republican
- Education: St. John's University School of Law

Paul Albert Fino (December 15, 1913 – June 16, 2009) was an American lawyer and liberal politician from New York. A member of the Republican Party, he served as a New York state senator, a member of the United States House of Representatives and a justice of the New York Supreme Court.

== Early life ==
Fino was born on December 15, 1913, in the Bronx to Isidore and Lucia Fino. He graduated from St. John's University School of Law in 1937.

== Legislative career ==
He ran unsuccessfully for the New York State Assembly in 1940 and the New York State Senate in 1942. In 1944, Fino ran in the 27th district and defeated the Minority Leader of the State Senate, John J. Dunnigan. He represented the 27th from 1945 to 1950, sitting in the 165th, 166th and 167th New York State Legislatures.

=== Congress ===
In 1952, he defeated Bernard O'Connell to win a seat in the 83rd Congress. He went on to win seven more terms, serving in the 84th, 85th, 86th, 87th, 88th, 89th and 90th United States Congresses, holding office from January 3, 1953, until his resignation on December 31, 1968.

In Congress, Fino leaned conservative and opposed racial busing and abortion. However, Fino voted in favor of the Civil Rights Acts of 1957, 1960, 1964, and 1968, as well as the 24th Amendment to the U.S. Constitution and the Voting Rights Act of 1965. He championed the creation of a "national lottery," which he believed would allow the federal government to raise additional revenue to fund crucial programs without raising taxes. At one point, he introduced a bill to outlaw the Communist Party. His positions also included support for traditionally liberal programs such as Medicare (he favored national health insurance), Social Security, and mass transit. In 1964, he proposed changes to the Social Security that would allow recipients to draw benefits at age 60 with no income limits. This was more generous than what the Democratic Party proposed.

Fino became an opponent of John Lindsay when the two served in Congress. After Lindsay became the Mayor of New York City in 1966, Fino continued to feud with him. The New York Times reported that Fino asked Lindsay for the appointment of a law partner as sanitation commissioner and was denied by the new mayor. Afterwards, he criticized Lindsay's more liberal legislative initiatives and mocked him for promoting New York as "Fun City". Lindsay countered by tacitly supporting efforts to remove Fino as the Bronx Republican leader.

He was a delegate to the 1960, 1964 and 1968 Republican National Conventions. From 1961 to 1968, he was also the Republican leader in The Bronx.

In 1961 Fino ran unsuccessfully for City Council president together with Louis J. Lefkowitz, who ran against Mayor Robert F. Wagner. The ticket included John J. Gilhooley of Brooklyn, a former assistant secretary of labor, for city comptroller, thus producing the ethnic trifecta of an Italian, a Jew and an Irishman. It is mainly remembered for the memorable campaign jingle which included:

 Let's make a note
 To get out and vote
 For Lefkowitz, Gilhooley and Fino[13]

== Later career ==
Fino won election to a newly created seat on the New York Supreme Court in 1968, and resigned from Congress on December 31; his seat was next filled by Mario Biaggi.

Fino served on the Court until 1972 and built a reputation for tough sentencing. In one case, he sentenced an addict to 30 years in prison for possession of 1/73 of an ounce of heroin.

On December 31, 1972, he resigned from the bench in order to run for a seat on the New York City Council. He stated at the time that a goal of returning to politics was to push out State Senator John D. Calandra from his post as the Bronx Republican leader. Fino lost in the Republican primary election to Pasquale Mele.

== Later life ==
In 1986, Fino published his autobiography, My Life in Politics and Public Service.

He was a resident of Atlantic Beach, New York, when he died on June 16, 2009, in North Woodmere, New York. He was buried at the Woodlawn Cemetery in the Bronx.

== General Reference ==
- Paul A. Fino Papers, 1933-1968. M.E. Grenander Department of Special Collections and Archives, University Libraries, University at Albany, State University of New York (hereafter referred to as the Fino Papers).

== Sources ==
- United States Congress. "Paul A. Fino (id: F000137)". Biographical Directory of the United States Congress.

New York State Senate
Preceded by Thomas C. Desmond	New York State Senate; 27th District; 1945–1950	Succeeded by Enzo Gaspari
U.S. House of Representatives
Preceded by Charles A. Buckley	Member of the U.S. House of Representatives from New York's 25th congressional district 1953–1963	Succeeded by Robert R. Barry
Preceded by Charles A. Buckley	Member of the U.S. House of Representatives from New York's 24th congressional district 1963–1968	Succeeded by Mario Biaggi
Party political offices
Preceded by Harry Uviller	Republican Nominee for New York City Comptroller; 1953	Succeeded by Walter McGahan
Preceded by Caroline Simon; 1957	Republican Nominee for New York City Council President; 1961	Succeeded by Timothy Costello
