= Oswald D. Heck =

American politician

Oswald David Heck (February 13, 1902 – May 21, 1959) was an American lawyer and politician. To date he has been the longest-serving Speaker of the New York State Assembly, and he was the last Speaker from Upstate New York.

== Life ==
He was born on February 13, 1902, in Schenectady, New York. In 1933, he married Beulah W. Slocum.

He was a member of the New York State Assembly in 1932, 1933, 1934, 1935, 1936, 1937, 1938, 1939–40, 1941–42, 1943–44, 1945–46, 1947–48, 1949–50, 1951–52, 1953–54, 1955–56, 1957–58 and 1959; and was Majority Leader in 1936, and Speaker from 1937 until his death in 1959.

He was a delegate to the 1944, 1948, 1952 and 1956 Republican National Conventions.

He died on May 21, 1959, in Schenectady, New York, of a heart attack; and was buried at the Vale Cemetery there.

== Sources ==
- Political Graveyard
- Obit notice in TIME magazine on June 1, 1959

New York State Assembly
Preceded by Charles W. Merriam	New York State Assembly; Schenectady County, 1st District; 1932–1944	Succeeded by district abolished
Preceded by new district	New York State Assembly; Schenectady County; 1945–1959	Succeeded by Joseph F. Egan
Political offices
Preceded by John F. Killgrew	Majority Leader of the New York State Assembly; 1936	Succeeded by Irving M. Ives
Preceded by Irving M. Ives	Speaker of the New York State Assembly; 1937–1959	Succeeded by Joseph F. Carlino
