= John Smolenski (politician) =

American businessman & politician (1891–1953)

John Smolenski (1891 – May 31, 1953) was an American businessman and politician from New York.

== Life ==
He was born in 1891 in Poland. The family emigrated to the United States when John was still a small boy, and settled in Greenpoint, Brooklyn. Later he opened a funeral home at 1044 Manhattan Avenue there. He married Charlotte Garstkiewicz (1897–1961), and their only child was Irene (Smolenski) Imperatore.

Smolenski was a member of the New York State Assembly (Kings Co., 15th D.) in 1938, 1939–40, 1941–42, 1943–44, 1945–46, 1947–48, 1949–50, 1951–52 and 1953.

He died on May 31, 1953; and was buried at the First Calvary Cemetery in Queens.

== Sources ==
New York State Assembly
Preceded by Edward P. Doyle	New York State Assembly; Kings County, 15th District; 1938–1953	Succeeded by James J. Amelia
