= John F. Wadlin =

American politician

John Joshua Foale Wadlin (May 31, 1901 – April 30, 1953) was an American lawyer and politician from New York.

== Life ==
He was born on May 31, 1901, in Brooklyn, New York City, the son of John Joshua Foale Wadlin (1860–1926) and Charlotte Isabel (Voight) Wadlin (1864–1937). He practiced law in Highland, Ulster County, New York. On August 8, 1935, he married lawyer Beatrice Hasbrouck (1910–1985), and they had three children.

Wadlin was Supervisor of the Town of Lloyd from 1938 to 1940, and Chairman of the Board of Supervisors of Ulster County in 1940. He was a member of the New York State Assembly (Ulster Co.) from 1941 until his death in 1953, sitting in the 163rd, 164th, 165th, 166th, 167th, 168th and 169th New York State Legislatures. In 1947, he co-sponsored the Condon-Wadlin Act which prohibited public employees to strike.

He died on April 30, 1953, at the Saulpaugh Hotel in Catskill, Greene County, New York, of a heart attack.

He was interred in Highland Cemetery. His wife was a historian for the Town of Lloyd and Highland for many years, and is buried alongside her husband. Her grandfather, Abraham E. Hasbrouck, served as a New York State Assemblyman, and her first cousin, once removed is Harcourt J. Pratt, U.S. Congressman and Lloyd supervisor.

His children are John Jay Wadlin, Elizabeth Wadlin Symonds (1936-2018), and Diane Hasbrouck Wadlin DeRoos.

== Sources ==
New York State Assembly
Preceded by J. Edward Conway	New York State Assembly; Ontario County; 1941–1953	Succeeded by Kenneth L. Wilson
Preceded by Unknown	Lloyd Supervisor; Ulster County; 1938-1940	Succeeded by Jacob J. Donovan
Preceded by Robert A. Snyder	Ulster County Board of Supervisors Chairman; Ulster County; 1940	Succeeded by Albert Cashdollar
