= Enzo Gaspari =

American politician and lawyer

Member of the New York Assembly for Bronx County, 11th District
- In office January 1, 1955 – December 31, 1956

Member of the New York State Senate for the 27th District
- In office January 1, 1951 – December 31, 1952

Personal details
- Born: February 26, 1915 The Bronx, New York City, U.S.
- Died: April 13, 1989 (aged 74) Albany, New York, U.S.
- Party: Democratic
- Education: St. John's University (BA, JD)

Enzo Gaspari (February 26, 1915 – April 13, 1989) was an American politician and lawyer from New York.

== Life and political career ==
Enzo Gaspari was born on February 26, 1915, in The Bronx. He attended St. John's University as an undergraduate and for law school. After this, he was elected to the New York State Senate's 27th district, and served from 1951 to 1952 as a part of the 168th New York State Legislature. He then served in the New York State Assembly as the representative for Bronx County's 11th district from 1955 to 1956.

In 1958, he was appointed counsel to the New York State Lottery Control Commission. In 1963, he became an assistant legislative representative for New York City's legislative lobbying office in Albany, where he served for 20 years. After his political career, he joined the law firm Shaw & Gould in 1983.

He died in Albany, New York, on April 13, 1989, after suffering a stroke.

New York State Assembly
Preceded by Paul A. Fino	New York State Senate; 27th District; 1951–1952	Succeeded by Joseph F. Periconi
Preceded by Gladys E. Banks	New York State Assembly; Bronx County, 11th District; 1955–1956	Succeeded by Thomas E. Ferrandina
