= James A. FitzPatrick (politician) =

American politician

James Anthony FitzPatrick (June 29, 1916 – February 13, 1988) was an American lawyer and politician from New York.

== Life ==
He was born on June 29, 1916, in Plattsburgh, Clinton County, New York. He attended the parochial schools, and for one year Villanova College. He graduated B.A. from The Catholic University of America in 1938; and LL.B. from Columbia Law School in 1941. During World War II he served in the U.S. Navy, and attained the rank of lieutenant commander. In 1948, he married Joan Frances Manning, and they had five children.

FitzPatrick was a member of the New York State Assembly (Clinton Co.) from 1947 to 1956, sitting in the 166th, 167th, 168th, 169th, 170th and 171st New York State Legislatures. He was an alternate delegate to the 1952 Republican National Convention.

FitzPatrick was Chairman of the New York Power Authority from 1963 to 1977. The James A. FitzPatrick Nuclear Power Plant in Scriba was named in his honor in 1975.

He died on February 13, 1988, in Champlain Valley Hospital in Plattsburgh, New York, of leukemia.

== Sources ==
New York State Assembly
Preceded by Leslie G. Ryan	New York State Assembly; Clinton County; 1947–1956	Succeeded by Robert J. Feinberg
