= Charles A. Buckley =

American politician

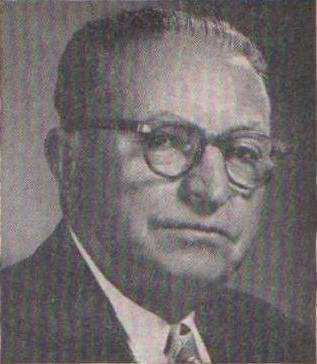

Chair of the Committee on Public Works
- In office January 3, 1951 – January 3, 1953
- In office January 3, 1955 – January 3, 1965

Chair of the House Committee on Pensions
- In office January 3, 1943 – January 3, 1947

Member of the U.S. House of Representatives from New York
- In office January 3, 1935 – January 3, 1965
- Preceded by: Frank A. Oliver
- Succeeded by: Jonathan Bingham
- Constituency: 23rd district (1935–1945); 25th district (1945–1953); 24th district (1953–1963); 23rd district (1963–1965)

New York City Chamberlain
- In office 1929–1933

New York City Board of Alderman
- In office 1918–1923

Personal details
- Born: June 23, 1890 New York City, New York, U.S.
- Died: January 22, 1967 (aged 76) New York City, New York, U.S.
- Party: Democratic
- Spouse: Marion Cowan
- Children: 2
- Occupation: contractor, builder

Charles Anthony Buckley (June 23, 1890 – January 22, 1967) was a Democratic Party politician from The Bronx, New York. An Irish-American, he served as Chairman of the Executive Committee of the Bronx County Democratic Party and a member of the United States House of Representatives, serving 15 terms from 1935 to 1965.

== Early life and career ==
Buckley was born in New York City. He was educated in the public schools, and became involved in the construction and contracting business. In 1911, at the age of 21, he became involved in party politics as a block captain in The Bronx. This led to his election to the Board of Aldermen, now the New York City Council, in 1918. He held his seat on the board until his appointment as a state tax appraiser in 1923. In 1929, Mayor Jimmy Walker appointed him as chamberlain, now a part of the city treasurer's office, to take succeed Edward J. Flynn, the Bronx party leader and a political mentor.

== Congress and party leader ==
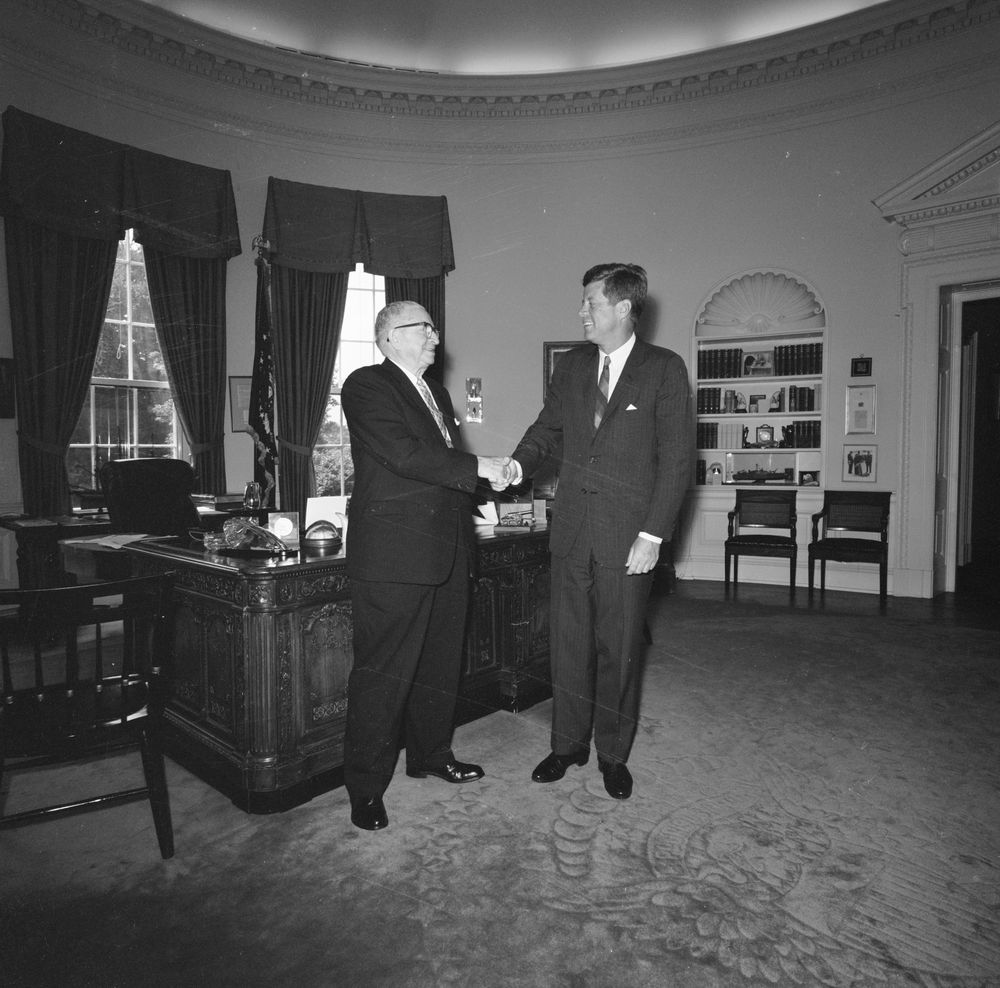
Buckley with President John F. Kennedy in 1962

In 1934, Buckley won a seat in Congress where he served for 30 years. In 1953, he succeeded Ed Flynn as the "boss" or Chairman of the Executive Committee of the Bronx County Democratic Party, a post from which he derived at least as much influence as his position on Capitol Hill. He used his influence to marshal delegates for John F. Kennedy in his 1960 campaign and developed a friendship with the president.

He rose to become the chairman of the House Committee on Pensions in the 78th Congress and 79th Congress and chairman of the Committee on Public Works in the 82nd Congress and from the 84th Congress through the 88th Congress. His chairmanship of the Public Works Committee gave him substantial power in allocating federal funds. A member of the House reported that when a congressman voted against a bill supported by President Kennedy, a federal office building that was scheduled for that district "disappeared" from the appropriations, only to reappear once the congressman changed his position. He also used his position to secure jobs for loyalists from The Bronx, helping him maintain power. However, The New York Times criticized him for his absenteeism, showing up for less than half of the votes in some years when it endorsed his opponent in 1964.

In his later years, he battled with reformist Democrats that sought to reduce the power of political bosses. He opposed Mayor Robert F. Wagner Jr. who, in 1961, was bidding for a third term in office and had broken with Tammany Hall. This began a feud with the mayor that ultimately led to Buckley's downfall. The mayor and reform Democrats supported David Levy in the Democratic primary in 1962. While Buckley won the race, the margin was only 2,940 votes out of 37,000 cast.

The 1964 Democratic primary election was the beginning of the end of his career in politics. He faced Jonathan Bingham, whom Mayor Wagner supported in an effort to remove him from office. Robert F. Kennedy, who received the Democratic nomination, in part due to Buckley's support, and President Lyndon Johnson endorsed the incumbent. The race was bitter with Buckley charging that Bingham was anti-Semitic, having been a member of the America First Committee. Bingham fired back with allegations that Buckley received work from a contractor free of charge at his home in Rockland County. On Election Day, Bingham won by 4,000 votes, ending Buckley's career in Congress.

Despite his defeat, he maintained his post as the head of the Bronx Democratic Party. Rumors swirled that he intended to arrange an appointment of Rep. Jacob H. Gilbert from the neighboring 22nd Congressional District to a judgeship. This would allow the local committee to nominate Buckley to replace Gilbert on the ballot in November. The plan would require votes from some members of the Manhattan Democratic Committee as well, and party leaders there rejected the idea.

== Personal life ==
He was married to the former Marion Cowan and had two children, a daughter, Eileen Buckley, and a son, Charles Anthony Buckley, Jr. He died on January 22, 1967, at his home in The Bronx from lung cancer.

== Sources ==
- United States Congress. "Charles A. Buckley (id: B001024)". Biographical Directory of the United States Congress.

U.S. House of Representatives
Preceded by Frank A. Oliver	Member of the U.S. House of Representatives from New York's 23rd congressional district 1935–1945	Succeeded by Walter A. Lynch
Preceded by Ralph A. Gamble	Member of the U.S. House of Representatives from New York's 25th congressional district 1945–1953	Succeeded by Paul A. Fino
Preceded by Isidore Dollinger	Member of the U.S. House of Representatives from New York's 24th congressional district 1953–1963	Succeeded by Paul A. Fino
Preceded by Jacob H. Gilbert	Member of the U.S. House of Representatives from New York's 23rd congressional district 1963–1965	Succeeded by Jonathan B. Bingham
Party political offices
Preceded by Edward J. Flynn	Chairman of the Executive Committee of the Bronx County Democratic Committee; 1953 – 1967	Succeeded by Patrick J. Cunningham
