= Joseph F. Carlino =

American lawyer and politician

Joseph Francis Carlino (June 23, 1917 – August 13, 2006) was an American lawyer and politician.

== Life ==
He was born on June 23, 1917, on the Lower East Side of Manhattan. His father Lorenzo Carlino became the Republican leader of Long Beach, New York in 1937. When his father died in 1943, Joseph succeeded to his father's position in the party. Joseph had then just graduated from Fordham University School of Law.

He was a member of the New York State Assembly from 1945 to 1964, sitting in the 165th, 166th, 167th, 168th, 169th, 170th, 171st, 172nd, 173rd and 174th New York State Legislatures. He was Majority Leader from 1955 to 1959, and was elected Speaker after the death of Oswald D. Heck in 1959. He held this post until 1964 when, as the sitting Speaker, he lost his seat at the 1964 Democratic landslide election after the death of John F. Kennedy.

He was an alternate delegate to the 1956 Republican National Convention, and a delegate to the 1960 and 1964 Republican National Conventions.

After leaving the Assembly, he resigned as Nassau County's Republican Party chairman and started a second career as one of Albany's best-paid lobbyists. In 1969, Governor Nelson Rockefeller sent him to Panama to advise General Omar Torrijos, who had taken power in a coup, on the wisdom of forming a more representative government.

Carlino's first wife, Joanne F. Hefferon, whom he had met in high school, died in 1988. His second wife, Annelisa, died in 1994. His son, Joseph Jr., died in 1977.

Carlino suffered a stroke in 1998, and died on August 13, 2006, at his home in Syosset, New York.

== Sources ==
- Obit in NYT on August 16, 2006
- Political Graveyard

New York State Assembly
Preceded by William S. Hults Jr.	New York State Assembly; Nassau County, 2nd District; 1945–1964	Succeeded by Jerome R. McDougal Jr.
Political offices
Preceded by Lee B. Mailler	Majority Leader of the New York State Assembly; 1955–1959	Succeeded by Charles A. Schoeneck Jr.
Preceded by Oswald D. Heck	Speaker of the New York State Assembly; 1959–1964	Succeeded by Anthony J. Travia
