= Matthew T. Abruzzo =

American judge

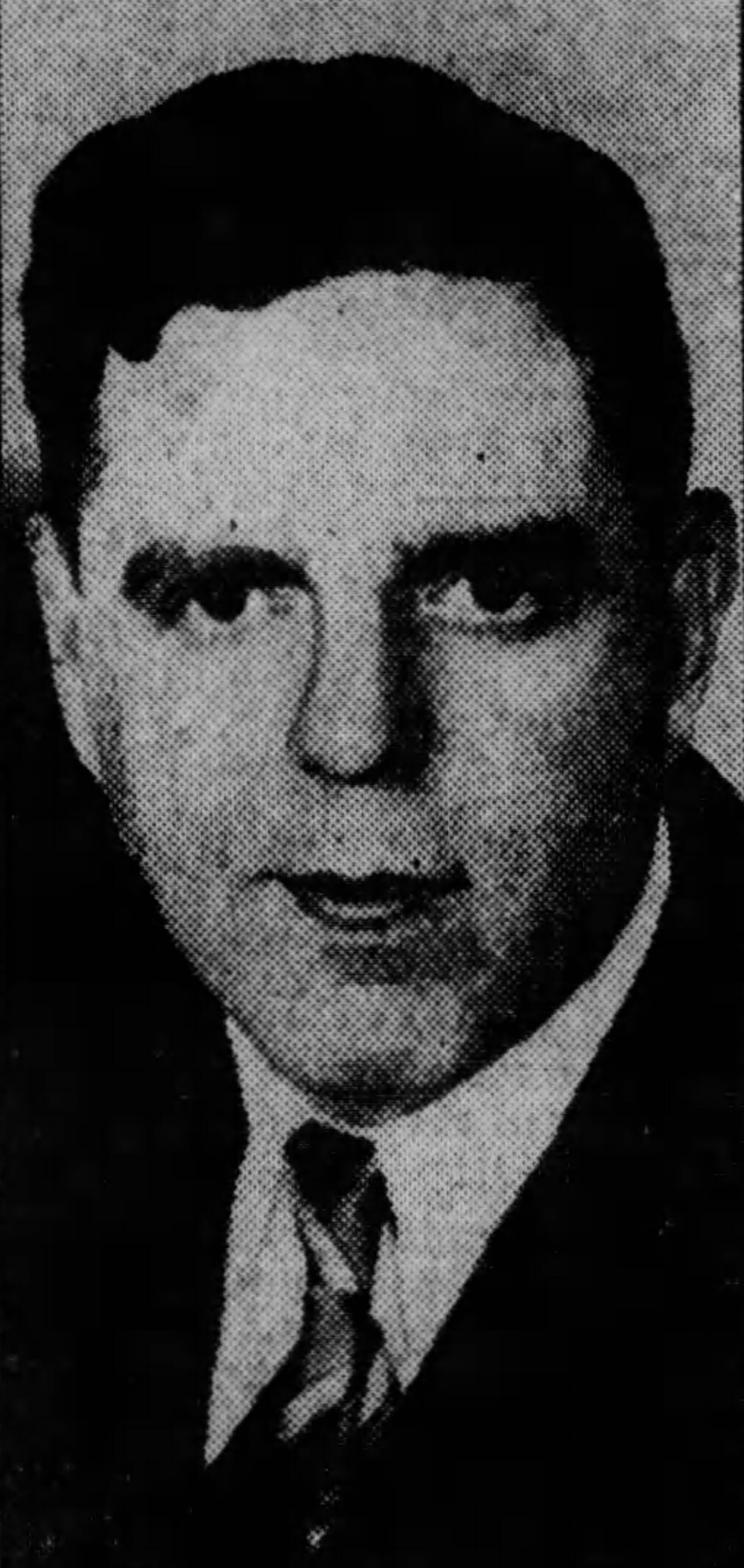

Senior Judge of the United States District Court for the Eastern District of New York
- In office February 15, 1966 – May 28, 1971

Judge of the United States District Court for the Eastern District of New York
- In office February 15, 1936 – February 15, 1966
- Appointed by: Franklin D. Roosevelt
- Preceded by: Seat established by 49 Stat. 659
- Succeeded by: Anthony J. Travia

Personal details
- Born: Matthew T. Abruzzo; April 30, 1889 Brooklyn, New York
- Died: May 28, 1971 (aged 82) Potomac, Maryland
- Education: Brooklyn Law School (LL.B.)

Matthew T. Abruzzo (April 30, 1889 – May 28, 1971) was a United States district judge of the United States District Court for the Eastern District of New York. He was the first Italian American to be appointed as a federal judge.

== Education and career ==
Born in Brooklyn, New York, Abruzzo received a Bachelor of Laws from Brooklyn Law School in 1910, and was in private practice in Brooklyn from then until 1936.

== Federal judicial service ==
Abruzzo was nominated by President Franklin D. Roosevelt on February 3, 1936, to the United States District Court for the Eastern District of New York, to a new seat authorized by 49 Stat. 659. He was confirmed by the United States Senate on February 12, 1936, and received his commission on February 15, 1936. He assumed senior status on February 15, 1966. His service terminated on May 28, 1971, due to his death in Potomac, Maryland.

== Sources ==
Legal offices
Preceded by Seat established by 49 Stat. 659	Judge of the United States District Court for the Eastern District of New York; 1936–1966	Succeeded by Anthony J. Travia
