= Irwin Steingut =

American politician (1893–1952)

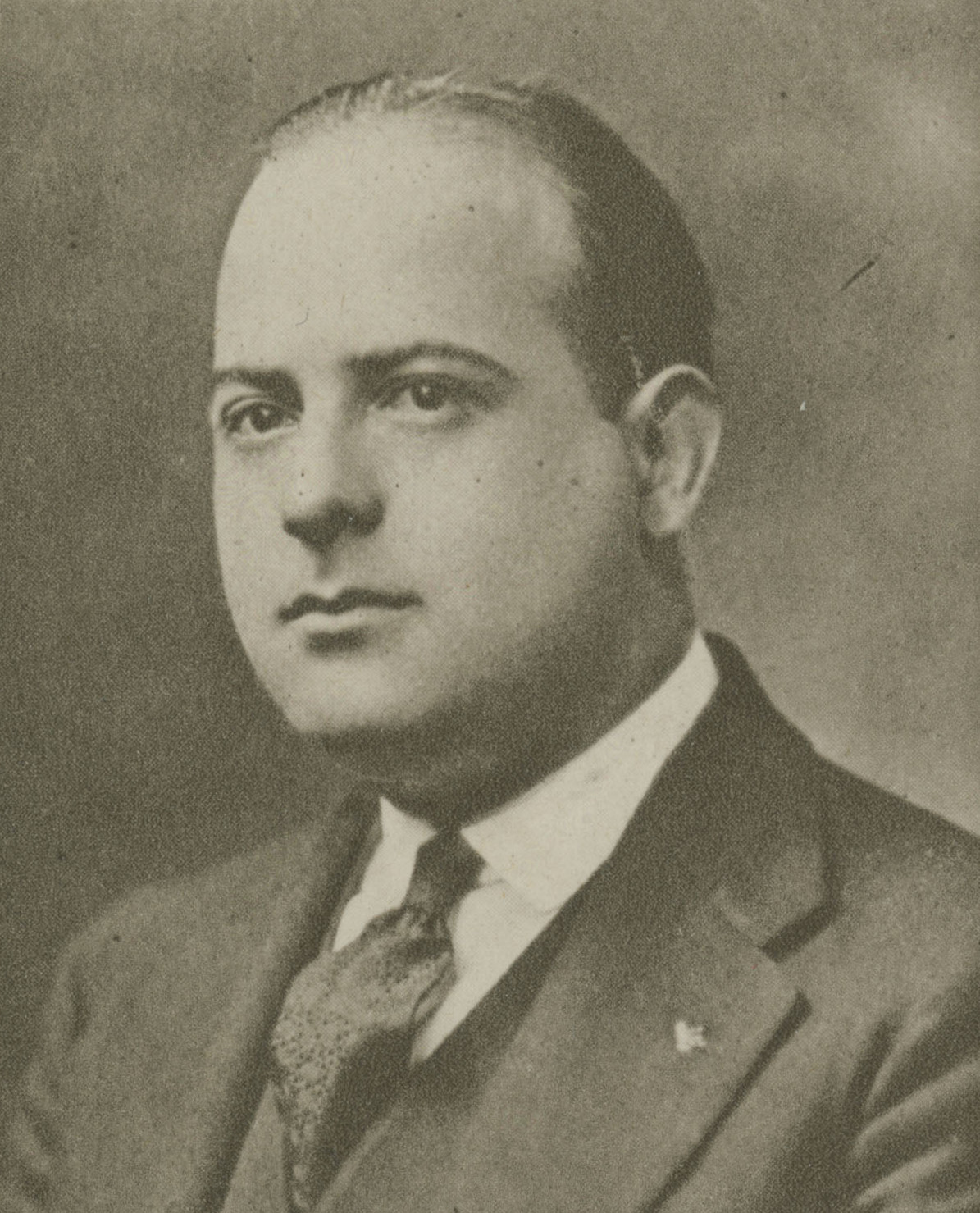

107th Speaker of the New York State Assembly
- In office January 2, 1935 – December 31, 1935
- Governor: Herbert H. Lehman
- Preceded by: Joseph A. McGinnies
- Succeeded by: Irving McNeil Ives

Member of the New York State Assembly from the 18th district
- In office January 1, 1922 – September 26, 1952
- Preceded by: Theodore Stitt
- Succeeded by: Stanley Steingut

Personal details
- Born: October 19, 1893 New York City, US
- Died: September 26, 1952 (aged 58) New York City, US
- Party: Democratic
- Spouse: Rea Kaufmann
- Children: 2, including Stanley
- Education: St. John's College, School of Law
- Profession: Insurance

Irwin Steingut (October 19, 1893 – September 26, 1952) was an American lawyer, businessman and politician. At the time of his death he had served as a member of the New York Assembly longer than anyone in history. Early in his career he teamed with Brooklyn boss John H. McCooey, who turned Brooklyn into a solidly Democratic power base and dominated its politics for a quarter of a century until his death in 1934. Steingut thereafter became the de facto leader of the Brooklyn Democratic Party. Throughout almost all of his legislative career Republicans held a majority in the New York Assembly, and much of that time Steingut was the Minority Leader. In 1935 for the one year the Democrats had the majority, Steingut was Speaker of the Assembly.

Steingut stoutly defended the Democratic party machine in Brooklyn and when consistent with the Brooklyn machine's interests also Tammany. He faced spirited primary opposition several times by independent Democrats but never lost a race. He was a key legislative ally of both Governors Franklin Delano Roosevelt and Herbert H. Lehman and considered his roles in the passage of unemployment relief under the former and the creation of Brooklyn College his greatest legislative achievements.

His son, Stanley Steingut, filled his Assembly seat at his death and became Speaker forty years after Irwin Steingut held the gavel. Brooklyn sent either Irwin or Stanley Steingut to the New York Assembly for 56 consecutive years.

== Early life and education ==
Irwin Steingut was born on October 19, 1893 (not 1891, as in Schlegel), on Manhattan's Lower East Side, the first of two sons to Simon and Lena Steingut. His mother, formerly Lena Wolbach, was born in Kiev, then in the Russian Empire. Simon Steingut was born on December 24, 1856, in Hamburg, one of three sons of Joseph Steingut, a banker who founded the banking house of Steingut & Son. He emigrated to the United States, sometime before 1881, where he took up residence in the portion of New York's Lower East Side known as Klein Deutschland (little Germany). Simon Steingut obtained a position as a Tammany Hall captain and as a result an auctioneer. Eventually he developed a real estate and insurance business as a broker and investor, building a successful firm, S. Steingut Company, first on Second Avenue, later at 47 West 42 Street, Manhattan. He was more famous, however, for his activities as a minor political operative and neighborhood fixer, begun when he opened an office at 31 Second Avenue in 1888, activities in which he engaged as an informally elected community "little mayor" for over a quarter of a century, for which he was referred to as the "Mayor of Second Avenue."

Irwin Steingut's obituary says that he "moved to Brooklyn as a young man and was educated in the public schools there." The move was in fact away from his father and involved the turbulent relations between his parents, which resulted in their eventual divorce amid much ridicule in the press. Simon Steingut had been married earlier to a woman named Mary. The divorce decree in 1881 prohibited Simon (although not Mary) from remarrying until she died. After Lena Woldach gave birth to Irwin, Simon obtained a modification of the decree from Judge Miles Beach. He then married Lena on April 10, 1894.

Within two years Lena Steingut had engaged a lawyer to seek support from Simon pending divorce. Steingut agreed but objected to the allegations of cruelty, telling all that his wife (at six feet, almost 14 inches taller than him) regularly beat him. A reconciliation occurred and the couple had another son, Edward (born April 20, 1900; he went to Commercial High School in Brooklyn). But at a high society ball in 1901, Simon had a jealous outburst. Lena retaliated by hiring detectives who eventually discovered Simon's relations with a singer ("Blond Cora" Brown) who Lena sued for $100,000 and then instituted divorce proceedings on May 22, 1902. Testimony was taken in the beginning of 1903, before Justice Hall. The Sun claimed that the action was a "shock" to the East Side, which looked on their marriage as a "model." The divorce decree became absolute on April 16. Like the earlier one, it also prohibited Steingut from remarrying, but he claimed he could remarry in New Jersey. Four months later, just as he was about to fulfill his promise by marrying an "actress" with "a position at the Metropolitan Opera," he learned that a divorced wife still had a dower interest in any real estate he purchased. He vowed to have this law changed. Divorce reform was a legislative goal for his son Irwin as well.

After Simon's death, the fact that Irwin's parents divorced was almost never mentioned, not even in the obituary of his mother, who was called the widow of Simon Steingut. But it came up again in 1945 when Irwin Steingut faced his most serious investigation into possible corruption.

In Brooklyn Irwin Steingut attended and graduated from Public School 19, then at the corner of South Second Street and Keap Avenue in Brooklyn. After public school he attended the Dwight School, on West Forty-Third Street in Manhattan. More than a decade later, while he was in the Assembly, he studied law at St. John's College, School of Law graduating in 1929. Irwin Steingut never practiced law, however.

Irwin was reluctant to follow his father's political career and after graduating law school became a reporter for Associated Press. After a year working in journalism, Irwin entered his father's real estate and insurance business on Forty-Second Street, which became S. Steingut & Son. Within a year he married Rea Kaufmann, daughter of Israel and Sophia Kaufman.

== Political apprenticeship ==
=== Tammany Hall ===
Simon Steingut's role as "Mayor of Second Avenue" was as one of 35 to 40 ethnic community leaders on the Lower East Side of Manhattan, who provided liaisons between government (and other institutions and persons of influence) and insular ethnic groups, usually made up of new immigrants or first generation Americans too ignorant or timid to deal with authority. Local "mayors" helped distribute patronage and favors, provide a means of access for new immigrants to government and party machines, and enforce party or political club discipline. The East Side mayors organized themselves into a group called "The East Side Mayors Association," which included both Democrat and Republican "mayors," each providing uncompensated services to his constituents. The "mayor" could then expect personal loyalty at the ballot box. Since the total voting pool from these three dozen fiefdoms amounted to seventy-six thousand, the mayors could expect handsome patronage or other favors from the victors for whom they delivered votes. It was yet another means by which Tammany Hall was part of the political fabric of the city.

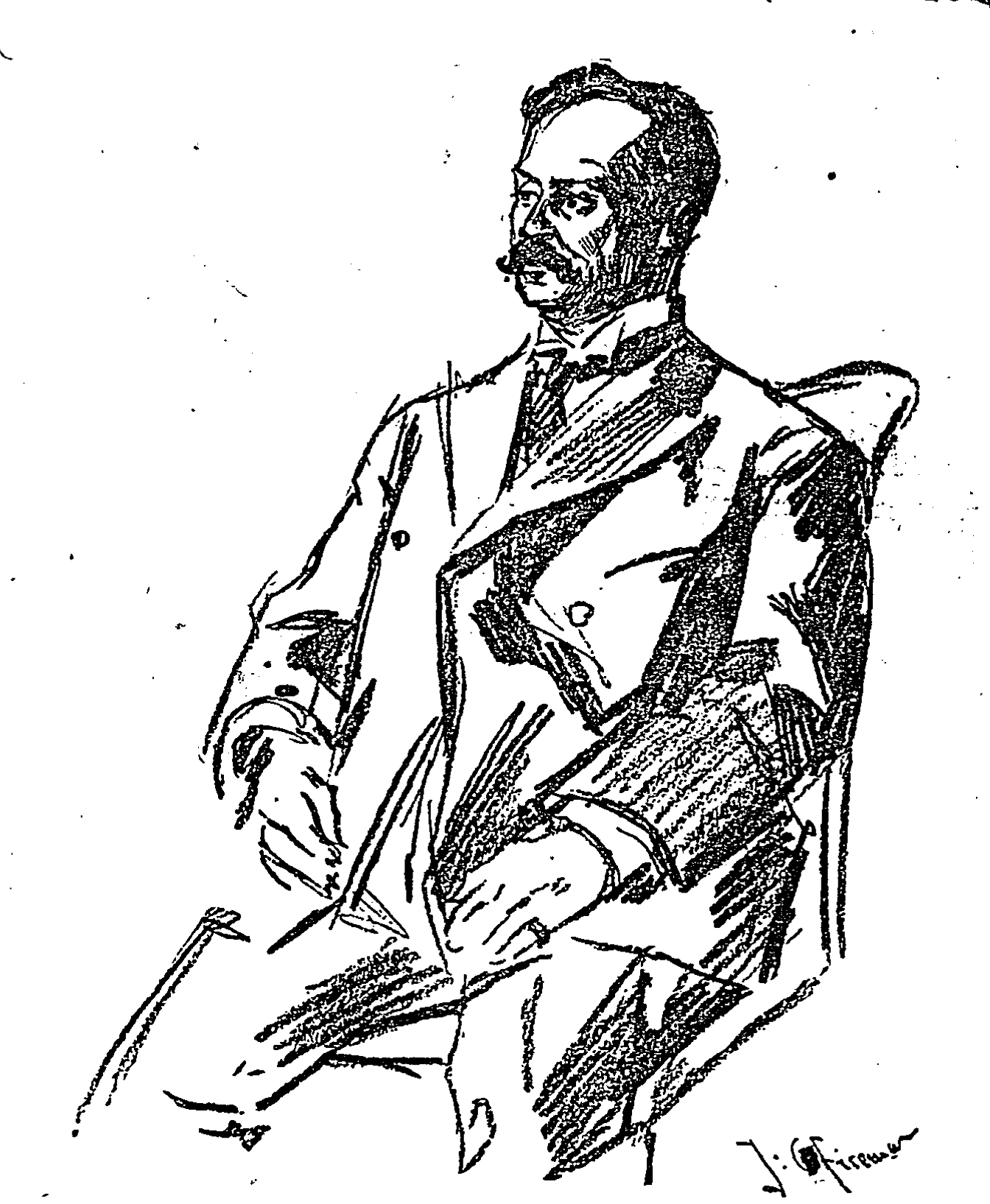
Simon Steingut, "Mayor of Second Avenue"

"Mayors" had no influence on party policy, and in many cases organized relief or benefits outside of government or party structure. They often used their own funds to help those in need. Constituents sought a wide range of services from mayors, one of the most common was to adjudicate local disputes. "Mayors" often provided legal advice or unauthorized representation. Simon Steingut was twice prosecuted for unauthorized practice of law. In one case, he argued that he was merely exercising the normal duties of a notary public. The case was dismissed on the condition he take down the law office sign which Steingut claimed was put in his office by an old tenant. In 1915 Simon was convicted of unauthorized practice of law at the beginning of a major sweep, in which "hundreds" of unlicensed lawyers were under surveillance. Steingut was sentenced to 30 days in jail, but his supporters raised the $250 fine in lieu of imprisonment.

The services these little mayors undertook ranged from explaining government, legal or business usages to constituents to intervening with institutions like banks to providing holiday food or winter coal for the poor. Simon Steingut made it a practice to distribute Christmas baskets to the poor of Second Avenue, and even on his death bed he instructed his son Irwin to distribute the usual number of baskets.

Simon Steingut was a loyal Tammany soldier, and only one time acted contrary to Tammany interests. That time was just before the divorce from Lena, and Steingut exacted revenge from the highly connected Harburger clan (which included Tammany politicians and officials) by arranging for the sale of the building which contained the Tammany clubhouse for the Harburger 10th district. Evicting the Tammany Club was Steingut's retaliation for Leopold Harburger acting as Lena's counsel. But Tammany was above such petty squabbles, and Steingut was back in its good graces and rewarded with the commission for acquiring property for a new theatre to be built on Second Avenue between Fourteenth and Twenty-Third Streets. The $350,000 real estate transaction was for a syndicate led by Timothy ("Big Tim") Sullivan and included other Tammany politicians.

Working for his father in a business so intimately connected with the favors of Tammany Hall, Irwin Steingut had to become involved in Tammany political work. But Simon also introduced his son to electoral politics of sorts. Simon himself never ran for government office. (He once announced his candidacy for Alderman of the 10th ward in 1911, but decided against it.) But each year he went before his constituents and stood for election at Ike Hirschborn's saloon at First Street and Second Avenue, and for 30 consecutive years he was elected "Mayor." Only in 1911 did he come dangerously close to losing. It was then that the new courthouse was built at the beginning of Second Avenue, and no one apprised Steingut of the decision. Since the court was attached to Joe Levy, the "Duke of Essex Street," the implication was that the powers were throwing their weight behind Levy, Steingut's archrival. That year Levy came within five votes, the closest he ever got until 1918 when he defeated Steingut outright in the year before Steingut's death. But back in 1911 Steingut showed his strength again later in the year. In May it was announced that Steingut was to sail to Europe to attend (at whose invitation Steingut refused to reveal) the coronation of King George V (as well as obtain the $5,000 inheritance his father left him). A lavish parade was planned to escort him to the Hoboken piers on June 8, with police escort, attended by other Little Mayors, but more importantly by Big Tim Sullivan and step-brother Larry Mulligan as well as a variety of Tammany judges and politicians. When Simon arrived at Hirschorn's, dressed in silk hat and morning clothes on June 4, Levy was ready to argue that Steingut was forfeiting his "office" by so long an absence. The crowd suggested that Irwin Steingut be elected temporary mayor, and in the ensuing voting he bested Levy by a 44-vote majority. The rebuff to Levy vindicated Simon's years of service, and provided a launching pad for Irwin's later electoral career.

Simon involved Irwin in projects and events involving close contact with Tammany figures. In 1912, Simon Steingut collected a group of Jewish bankers and realtors to form a corporation (in which Big Tim Sullivan also had an interest) for the construction of a building on Second Avenue for two theaters as well as offices, lofts and a place for a dramatic school, for the production of Yiddish and German drama. The ground floor theater was to be devoted to "high class drama," while the rooftop theater was to be designed for cinema and vaudeville. The best European actors were to be sought for a professional resident company, and "an experienced manager will be engaged." Irwin was designated to supervise the project, because Simon was concentrating on real estate work.

Irwin's association with his father now got him noticed by both the press (the Tribune, for example, noted his presence at the following year's election by calling him a "slick young feller") and Tammany (at the large funeral of the Republican leader of the 8th Assembly District, Irwin was mentioned between Thomas H. Smith, secretary of Tammany and Samuel Gompers). When Simon Steingut eventually died in 1919, he had impressed Irwin and most observers with his deep commitment for the community and especially the poor, a perspective that Irwin did not lose during his long legislative career.

After Simon died on March 11, 1919, Irwin Steingut, now the principal of S. Steingut & Son, began a spurt of activity, soliciting apartment building owners in Manhattan, Brooklyn and The Bronx wishing to sell as well as garage owners. His break with the style of his father seemed complete when he began his campaign to have 1,000 businesses raise $50,000 to combat "radicalism" on the Lower East Side. It was a move to improve the image of the neighborhood and the citizen Jews who lived there. Irwin soon transitioned from a real estate to an insurance dealer business and move to Brooklyn, although he still listed the Manhattan address as his place of business right before his Brooklyn assembly campaign in his Board of Elections filing.

=== John McCooey and the Madison Club of Brooklyn ===
After his father's death, Irwin Steingut's move back to Brooklyn, which became his political base for the next three decades, was facilitated by Tammany Leader Charles Murphy, who introduced Steingut to John H. McCooey, the political boss of Brooklyn. The introduction proved the most fortuitous event in Steingut's life, for McCooey became his mentor, sponsor, and eventually closest friend.

McCooey was a self-made man, having taken on the role of head of a family (of a widow and six children) at the age of 13 when his father died in an accident. For seven years he worked at the shipbuilding firm in which his father had worked Chester, Pennsylvania, while teaching himself mechanical engineering. At 20 he moved to New York eventually obtaining a job in the Brooklyn Navy Yard, a job in the suffrage of the local political machine. In 1878 he obtained a position in the Post Office. Although he mastered all aspects of the service and was promoted to a more lucrative postmaster position, he was cashiered for political reasons when the Republicans regained control. He threw in with the local Brooklyn Democratic organization (for which he had been acting as a district leader) and obtained a post as deputy treasurer of King's County. Through his association with Patrick H. McCarren, he obtained the position as secretary of the Civil Service Commission (located in Manhattan) in the new consolidated City of New York. He worked his way to chairmanship, all the while acquainting himself with men and ways of Tammany. In the early days of consolidation there was considerable hostility between Brooklyn democrats and Tammany, but McCooey remained friendly with Tammany (while siding with Brooklyn). McCarren became head of the Brooklyn party, and was eventually squeezed out of state party affairs by Charles Murphy, who not only controlled Tammany but had dominating influence over the state party. McCooey was selected by the Brooklyn party's executive committee as a caretaker chairman until the conflicting factions of Brooklyn democrats could settle on a leader.

McCooey's personal political base was the 18th Assembly District, which in 1910 comprised Crown Heights, East Flatbush, Flatbush, Prospect Park, Windsor Terrace and parts of Kensington, Midwood and Flatlands. McCooey moved whenever necessary to stay within the district. His personal political club was the Madison Club, an organization he founded with four others in 1905. Before Steingut's arrival, notwithstanding the efforts of the Madison Club, Democrats were rarely successful in sending a representative to Albany. In the 13 elections between 1908 and 1920 the Democrats only won twice.

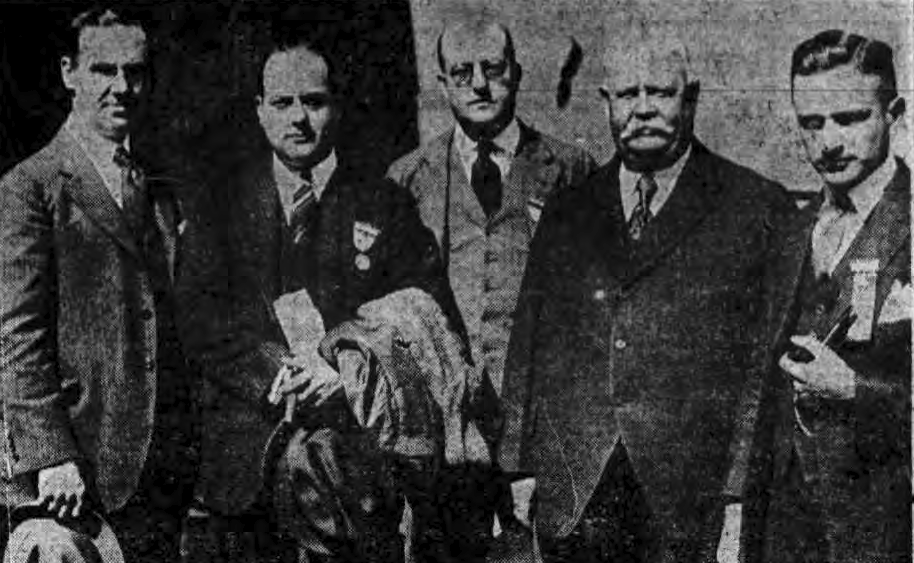
(l to r) W.B. Vause, Irwin Steingut, John J. Campbell, John H. McCooey, W.A. Hyman in 1922.

Steingut family tradition has it that his place on the 1921 ticket for assemblyman was secured when his mother-in-law, Sophia Kaufman, and his own mother, Lena Steingut, approached McCooey and asked "Why not run a Jew for Assemblyman?" McCooey is supposed to have said that it was a "good thought." The fact was, however, that although McCooey himself was of Irish descent and connected with all important Brooklyn Irish associations and although the Irish district often nominated an Irish-American, the Madison Club twice before 1921 had secured the nomination of Jews for the Assembly race (Edward Baruch in 1910 and Jacob Friedman in 1917). It is likely that Tammany's recommendation was more persuasive in Irwin's case than his mother-in-law's. In any event, the Madison Club ran Irwin Steingut for Assembly in 1921. Steingut beat his Republican opponent (Mortimer J. Wohl, also Jewish) 46% to 38%, with the Socialist candidate receiving 14%. The votes were 10,267, 8,537 and 3,143, respectively (and less than 300 to the Farmer-Labor and Prohibition candidates).

== Assembly career ==
Steingut's 1921 election began a career in the Assembly which lasted for the rest of his life. (Note: He was a member of the New York State Assembly (Kings Co., 18th D.) in 1922, 1923, 1924, 1925, 1926, 1927, 1928, 1929, 1930, 1931, 1932, 1933, 1934, 1935, 1936, 1937, 1938, 1939–40, 1941–42, 1943–44, 1945–46, 1947–48, 1949–50 and 1951–52; and was Minority Leader from 1930 to 1934, Speaker in 1935, and again Minority Leader from 1936 to 1952. He also served as a delegate to the 1936, 1940, 1944 and 1948 Democratic National Conventions. In addition, he was a member of the New York State Democratic Committee in 1936 and 1948.) His election in 1921, however, was largely on the coattails of Mayor Hylan who won re-election with a resounding majority. Hylan's overall majority in the city was 64.2% with a plurality of 417,986 votes; in Brooklyn his majority was 62.1%, and in Steingut's 18th Assembly District his majority was 53.5%. The Democratic sweep was felt throughout the city. Democrats picked up fourteen seats on the Board of Aldermen, for example, making their majority over Republicans 50-15. A victory had been expected for some time. Assistant District Attorney James Gallagher in August assured the largest crowd in Madison Club history that it was a safe year for the mayor, while Steingut himself spoke to the same standing room only crowd. Active club members could be expected to be remembered for services, especially given that McCooey was a close friend of the mayor's dating back to a favor he long ago conferred on the mayor when the latter was a simple working man. (Note: McCooey cashed a money order at the Post Office, even though Hylan had no identification.) If there was any question about the relation of the mayor and John McCooey after the election, it was dispelled when a surprise tribute to McCooey was organized in December 1921 at which the mayor spoke warmly of McCooey's work in the district; all affirmed Democratic loyalty. It was clear to Steingut even before he was sworn in to whom his allegiance belonged, and as long as McCooey lived, Steingut was a loyal lieutenant.

At the beginning of his career Steingut was not heard on the big issues—those that affected Brooklyn and the city and Democratic political generally, all of which were matters for the machine. He campaigned on generic Brooklyn Democratic issues. (Note: His 1921 election handbill emphasized Brooklyn Home Rule, a soldier bonus for World War I vets, maintenance of the 5¢ transit fare with free transfers and telephone, gas and electric rates.) During the session Steingut introduced three bills, none of which emerged from their respective committees. By the end of the first term, with an eye toward re-election, Steingut made a play for popularity by championing the interests of boxing fans. He called for a cap on ticket prices to bouts (Note: In August 1922 Steingut wrote to the New York State Athletic Commission to support a letter by Assemblyman McKee to cap boxing ticket prices at $7 per seat for championship fights and $5 for other bouts. He suggested that he would introduce a bill to that effect if the Commission did not act. Steingut introduced such legislation in the next session.) and demanded an investigation into one of Harry Wills's fights to determine if it was "set up," He won re-election in November 1922 by a wide margin (53.5% to his Republican rival's 33%). Once again Steingut benefitted from strong up-ticket performance. This time it was the governor's race, in which Catholic Al Smith, overwhelmingly carried the heavily Catholic Kings County, taking over 70% of the vote.

In his second legislative term, Steingut continued to generate publicity for himself on "leisure" and "entertainment" issues. Like most of the New York City delegation, Steingut supported repeal of the New York prohibition act and for amendment of the federal Volstead Act to the extent of permitting the sale of light wine and beer. (Note: Steingut argued that repeal would "rid ourselves of violence and the bootlegger.) He introduced the bill he promised before his re-election to limit the price of boxing tickets. He introduced a bill permitting the use of portable movie projectors by non-licensed, private operators. The bill was widely supported by educational and fraternal organizations and passed the legislature. But Governor Smith believed the highly flammable film was too dangerous when used by untrained persons and vetoed the bill. Steingut also introduced a bill which called for an investigation into aeronautic stunts above populated areas and provided funds for legislative remedy. Another of Steingut's bills was directed at the Ku Klux Klan. It would have required all unincorporated associations with more than 20 members to send its membership list to the Secretary of State, together with its constitution, by-laws and membership oath. Steingut also proposed one of five Democratic bills seeking to increase compensation to certain New York City officials—proposals which Republicans dismissed as "a raid on the treasury."

Despite twice elected by sizeable pluralities, Steingut remained mindful that the religious and ethnic majorities of the district were not his own. In the 1923 race he highlighted the fact that his Republican opponent had changed his name to Allan Lane from Abraham Levine, evidently to point out that his opponent was no less Jewish than he was. He also made efforts to associate himself with Catholic charities. (Note: In 1923, for example, he was able to get himself appointed to the Irish committee, The Emerald Association, which held an annual ball at the Waldorf-Astoria to benefit a Catholic orphanage and other Catholic charities.) He also continued to labor to build McCooey's Madison Club. In 1923 heading up the reception committee, the club's annual dinner-dance produced record, over-flowing attendance, and it produced enough funds to allow the club to begin its planned three-story upgrade. He won his 1923 election with 53% of the vote (over Lane and a Socialist opponent).

The third term that Steingut served was much like the previous two. The Democrats were still the minority party and so even with Democrat Al Smith as governor, Democrats were not major players in the Assembly. Brooklyn Democrats specifically received none of the important committee assignments or chairmanships. Steingut himself served on the insurance and revision committees. The most important bill he proposed was simply to exempt certain low rent landlords from municipal property taxes. In addition to being shut out of power, the New York City delegation felt oppressed in light of the pay raise given to New York City Aldermen, making their salary more than three times an assemblyman's for what amounted to one day's work a week. Many assemblymen therefore cut down their time in Albany to tend to their own businesses at home. It was during this period that Steingut contemplated leaving the Assembly. The congressional seat soon became vacant because the Democrats had no intention to re-nominate Charles I. Stengle who had moved to New Jersey and was not heard from in the district. On June 10, over 1,500 Democrats, practically all of the Madison Club membership and more, together with John McCooey, senator Jimmy Walker and paint magnate Arthur S. Somers as toastmaster, turned out for a dinner at Brighton Beach designed to create a "boom" for Steingut-for-Congress. The boom failed to gain momentum, and McCooey eventually endorsed Andrew L. Somers, Arthur's son, in the Democratic primary. Somers represented the district until his death in 1949.

== Family ==
On June 12, 1914, he married Rea Kaufmann (b. June 12, 1893, in New York City). They had two children, Jeanne Eleanor Weiss (b. August 12, 1917) and Speaker Stanley Steingut (1920–1989).

== Death ==
Steingut died in Brooklyn on September 26, 1952, and was buried in Montefiore Cemetery in Springfield Gardens, Queens.

=== Notes ===
New York State Assembly
Preceded by Theodore Stitt	New York State Assembly; Kings County, 18th District; 1922–1952	Succeeded by Stanley Steingut
Political offices
Preceded by Peter J. Hamill	Minority Leader in the New York State Assembly; 1930–1934	Succeeded by Irving Ives
Preceded by Joseph A. McGinnies	Speaker of the New York State Assembly; 1935	Succeeded by Irving Ives
Preceded by Irving Ives	Minority Leader in the New York State Assembly; 1936–1952	Succeeded by Eugene F. Bannigan
