= Maude E. Ten Eyck =

New York politician

- In office 1947–1954

Personal details
- Born: August 21, 1902 Brookline, Massachusetts
- Died: March 7, 1977 (aged 74) Cohoes, New York
- Party: Republican

Maude E. Ten Eyck (August 21, 1902 – March 7, 1977) was an American politician from New York.

== Life ==
She was born Maude Edwards on August 21, 1902, in Brookline, Massachusetts. She married Lansing V. Ten Eyck (1898–1977), and their son was Lansing Ten Eyck Jr.

She became active in politics as a Republican, was President of the Young Women's Republican Club of New York City, was appointed as clerk to several State Senate committees, and was an alternate delegate to the 1940 Republican National Convention and a delegate to the 1944 Republican National Convention.

She was a member of the New York State Assembly (New York Co., 1st D.) from 1947 to 1954, sitting in the 166th, 167th, 168th and 169th New York State Legislatures. In November 1954, she ran for re-election, but was defeated.

She was a Deputy Journal Clerk of the State Assembly from 1955 to 1964.

Later she removed to Waterford, New York.

She died on March 7, 1977, in Cohoes Memorial Hospital in Cohoes, New York.

Speaker of the New York State Assembly Truman G. Younglove (1815–1882) was her great-grandfather.

== Sources ==
New York State Assembly
Preceded by MacNeil Mitchell	New York State Assembly; New York County, 1st District; 1947–1954	Succeeded by William F. Passannante
