= Anthony J. Travia =

American judge (1911–1993)

Anthony John Travia

Judge of the United States District Court for the Eastern District of New York
- In office July 17, 1968 – November 30, 1974
- Appointed by: Lyndon B. Johnson
- Preceded by: Matthew T. Abruzzo
- Succeeded by: George C. Pratt

114th Speaker of the New York State Assembly
- In office January 1, 1965 – July 17, 1968
- Preceded by: Joseph F. Carlino
- Succeeded by: Perry B. Duryea Jr.

Minority Leader of the New York State Assembly
- In office January 1, 1959 – December 31, 1964
- Preceded by: Eugene F. Bannigan
- Succeeded by: George L. Ingalls

Member of the New York State Assembly
- In office January 1, 1949 – July 17, 1968
- Preceded by: Joseph M. Soviero
- Succeeded by: Vito P. Battista
- Constituency: Kings County's 22nd district (1949-1965); 38th district (1966-1968)
- In office November 2, 1943 – December 31, 1946
- Preceded by: James A. Corcoran
- Succeeded by: Joseph M. Soviero
- Constituency: Kings County's 22nd district

Personal details
- Born: Anthony John Travia; February 26, 1911 Milwaukee, Wisconsin, U.S.
- Died: December 7, 1993 (aged 82) Poughkeepsie, New York, U.S.
- Party: Democratic
- Education: St. John's University School of Law (LL.B.)

Anthony John Travia (February 26, 1911 – December 7, 1993) was a lawyer and politician who served as Speaker of the New York State Assembly and a United States district judge of the United States District Court for the Eastern District of New York.

== Education and career ==
Born in Milwaukee, Wisconsin, Travia received a Bachelor of Laws from St. John's University School of Law in 1932. He was in private practice of law in New York from 1933 to 1968. He was a Member of the New York State Assembly from 1943 to 1946 and from 1948 to 1968.

=== State assembly and other political service ===
On November 2, 1943, he was elected as a Democrat to the New York State Assembly (Kings Co., 22nd D.), to fill the vacancy caused by the resignation of James A. Corcoran. He was re-elected in 1944, and remained in the Assembly until 1946, sitting in the 164th and 165th New York State Legislatures.

Travia was again a member of the State Assembly from 1949 to 1968, sitting in the 167th, 168th, 169th, 170th, 171st, 172nd, 173rd, 174th, 175th, 176th and 177th New York State Legislatures; and was Minority Leader from 1959 to 1964, and Speaker of the New York State Assembly from 1965 to 1968.

Travia faced a divisive 1965 leadership contest with fellow Brooklyn Democrat Stanley Steingut, where he depended on the support of the Rockefeller Republicans along with the smaller Tammany Hall faction of Democrats. His reliance on Republican votes ended, and a rematch with Steingut was avoided, once the emergent New York State Black and Puerto Rican Legislative Caucus made a deal to support him in 1966.

He was President of the New York State Constitutional Convention of 1967.

==== Notable legislation ====
Travia is the author of Travia Leave, Law 3107 of the NYS Education Law, which specifies that public employees who are members of a retirement system "…shall upon application be granted a retirement leave with full pay consisting of one half of their accumulated unused sick leave up to a maximum of one semester."

== Federal judicial service ==
Travia was nominated by President Lyndon B. Johnson on April 25, 1968, to a seat on the United States District Court for the Eastern District of New York vacated by Judge Matthew T. Abruzzo. He was confirmed by the United States Senate on June 24, 1968, and received his commission on July 17, 1968. His service was terminated on November 30, 1974, due to his resignation.

== Post judicial service and death ==
Following his resignation from the federal bench, Travia returned to the private practice of law in New York until his death. He died on December 7, 1993, at the Vassar Brothers Medical Center in Poughkeepsie, New York.

== Personal ==
In 1935, Travia married Rita A. Sorrentino and they had two sons.

New York State Assembly
Preceded by James A. Corcoran	New York State Assembly Kings County, 22nd District; 1944–1946	Succeeded by Joseph M. Soviero
Preceded by Joseph M. Soviero	New York State Assembly Kings County, 22nd District; 1949–1965	Succeeded by District abolished
Preceded by District established	New York State Assembly 38th District; 1966–1968	Succeeded by Vito P. Battista
Political offices
Preceded by Eugene F. Bannigan	Minority Leader of the New York State Assembly; 1959–1964	Succeeded by George L. Ingalls
Preceded by Joseph F. Carlino	Speaker of the New York State Assembly; 1965–1968	Succeeded by Moses M. Weinstein (Acting)
Legal offices
Preceded by Matthew T. Abruzzo	Judge of the United States District Court for the Eastern District of New York; 1968–1974	Succeeded by George C. Pratt
