= Mildred F. Taylor =

American politician

Mildred F. Taylor (April 21, 1905 – January 4, 1981) was an American politician from New York.

== Life ==
She was born Mildred Frick on April 21, 1905, in Lyons, Wayne County, New York, the daughter of Louis Frick and Belle (Everhart) Frick (1874–1954). She attended the public schools, Lyons High School, and Rochester Business Institute. On September 22, 1937, she married Elijah Paul Taylor (1903–1969) with whom she ran a coal retailing business in Lyons.

She became active in politics as a Republican. She was a delegate to the 1940, 1948 and 1960 Republican National Conventions, and an alternate delegate to the 1952 Republican National Convention; and Chairwomen of the Wayne County Republican Committee from 1943 to 1956.

She was a member of the New York State Assembly (Wayne Co.) from 1947 to 1960, sitting in the 166th, 167th, 168th, 169th, 170th, 171st and 172nd New York State Legislatures. In 1953, she became the first woman appointed to the Assembly Committee on Ways and Means. She was a presidential elector in 1956, voting for Dwight D. Eisenhower and Richard Nixon.

She died on January 4, 1981, in Clifton Springs Hospital in Clifton Springs, New York; and was buried at the South Lyons Cemetery in Lyons.

== Sources ==
New York State Assembly
| Preceded by Henry V. Wilson | New York State Assembly; Wayne County; 1947–1960 | Succeeded by Joseph C. Finley |
