= Arthur H. Wicks =

American politician (1887–1985)

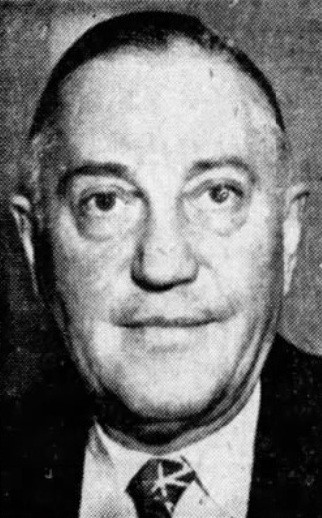
Wicks in 1956

Arthur H. Wicks (December 24, 1887 – February 18, 1985) was an American politician from New York.

== Life ==
He was born on December 24, 1887, in New York City. He owned a steam laundry in Kingston, New York.

He was a member of the New York State Senate from 1927 to 1956, sitting in the 150th, 151st, 152nd, 153rd, 154th, 155th, 156th, 157th, 158th, 159th, 160th, 161st, 162nd, 163rd, 164th, 165th, 166th, 167th, 168th, 169th and 170th New York State Legislatures; and was Temporary President of the State Senate from 1949 to 1953. He was an alternate delegate to the 1940 and 1944, and a delegate to the 1948, 1952 and 1956 Republican National Conventions.

On October 1, 1953, he became Acting Lieutenant Governor of New York, but was forced to resign on November 18, 1953, as temporary president and acting lieutenant governor when it became known that he had made frequent visits to convicted labor leader Joseph S. Fay while the latter was incarcerated at Sing-Sing prison.

He died in February 18, 1985.

== Sources ==
- William J. Keating, with Richard Carter: The Man Who Rocked the Boat (Harper & Brothers Publishers, New York, 1956, Library of Congress catalog card number: 56-6025)

New York State Senate
Preceded by Arthur F. Bouton	New York State Senate; 29th District; 1927–1944	Succeeded by William F. Condon
Preceded by Rhoda Fox Graves	New York State Senate; 34th District; 1945–1956	Succeeded by E. Ogden Bush
Political offices
Preceded by Benjamin F. Feinberg	Temporary President of the New York State Senate; 1949–1953	Succeeded by Walter J. Mahoney
Preceded by Frank C. Moore	Lieutenant Governor of New York; Acting; 1953	Succeeded by Walter J. Mahoney; Acting
