= Gladys E. Banks =

American politician (1897–1972)

Member of the New York State Assembly (Bronx County, 11th District)
- In office 1945–1950

Member of the New York State Assembly (Bronx County, 11th District)
- In office 1953–1954

Personal details
- Born: July 2, 1897 Bronx, New York, U.S.
- Died: November 5, 1972 (aged 75) Greene County, New York, U.S.
- Party: Republican
- Spouse: John W. Banks

Gladys E. Banks (July 2, 1897 – November 5, 1972) was an American politician from New York.

== Life ==
She was born on July 2, 1897, in the Bronx. She married John W. Banks.

She was a member of the New York State Assembly (Bronx Co., 11th D.) from 1945 to 1950, sitting in the 165th, 166th and 167th New York State Legislatures. In November 1950, she ran for re-election, but was defeated by Democrat Clarke S. Ryan. In November 1952, she defeated Ryan who ran for re-election.

She was again a member of the State Assembly in 1953 and 1954. In 1954, after redistricting, she ran for re-election in the 12th Bronx District, but was defeated by Democrat Fred W. Eggert, Jr.

She was an alternate delegate to the 1948, 1952 and 1956 Republican National Conventions, and a delegate to the 1960 Republican National Convention. She was a member of the New York State Republican Committee in 1950.

She died on November 5, 1972, in Greene County, New York.

== Sources ==
New York State Assembly
Preceded by new district	New York State Assembly; Bronx County, 11th District; 1945–1950	Succeeded by Clarke S. Ryan
Preceded by Clarke S. Ryan	New York State Assembly; Bronx County, 11th District; 1953–1954	Succeeded by Enzo Gaspari
