= Elizabeth Hanniford =

American politician

Elizabeth Hanniford (January 1, 1909 – December 9, 1977) was an American politician from New York.

== Life ==
Elizabeth Hanniford was born on January 1, 1909, in New York City. She attended public schools, and then became a statistician. She married Kenneth Hanniford (1901–1964), and they had a son: Kenneth Hanniford (born c. 1935).

Hanniford was a Republican member of the New York State Assembly (Bronx Co., 9th D.) from 1947 to 1950, sitting in the 166th and 167th New York State Legislatures.

She died in December 1977.

== Sources ==
New York State Assembly
Preceded by Francis T. Murphy	New York State Assembly; Bronx County, 9th District; 1947–1950	Succeeded by James J. O'Brien
