= Harold D. Toomey =

American lawyer and politician

Harold Dean Toomey (January 20, 1898 – March 11, 1953) was an American lawyer and politician from New York.

== Life ==
He was born on January 20, 1898, in Bridgeport, Connecticut, the son of J. D. Toomey (1868–1932). The family removed to Mount Vernon, New York where Harold attended the public schools and A. B. Davis High School. During World War I he served in the U.S. Army, attaining the rank of lieutenant in the field artillery. He graduated from Yale University and Fordham Law School. He was admitted to the bar, and practiced law in Mount Vernon in partnership with his father.

Toomey was a member of the Board of Supervisors of Westchester County. He was a member of the New York State Assembly (Westchester Co., 3rd D.) from 1948 until his death in 1953, sitting in the 166th, 167th, 168th and 169th New York State Legislatures.

He died during the legislative session on March 11, 1953, in his hotel room in Albany, New York, of a heart attack.

== Sources ==
New York State Assembly
Preceded by P. Raymond Sirignano	New York State Assembly; Westchester County, 3rd District; 1948–1953	Succeeded by Frances K. Marlatt
