= Louis Bennett (politician) =

American lawyer and politician

Louis Bennett (died March 30, 1959) was an American lawyer and politician from New York.

== Life ==
Bennett was an Assistant U.S. Attorney for the Southern and Eastern Districts of New York, and the District of New Jersey.

He was a member of the New York State Assembly from 1939 to 1948, sitting in the 162nd, 163rd, 164th, 165th and 166th New York State Legislatures.

He was a member of the New York State Senate (26th D.) in 1949. He resigned his seat on July 22, 1949, to run for the New York City Municipal Court.

He was a justice of the Municipal Court from 1950 until his death in 1959.

He died on March 30, 1959 and was buried in Mount Carmel Cemetery in Flushing, Queens.

== Sources ==
New York State Assembly
Preceded by Gerard J. Muccigrosso	New York State Assembly; Bronx County, 7th District; 1939–1944	Succeeded by Louis Peck
Preceded by John A. Devany, Jr.	New York State Assembly; Bronx County, 8th District; 1945–1948	Succeeded by John T. Satriale
New York State Senate
Preceded by Isidore Dollinger	New York State Senate; 26th District; 1949	Succeeded by Nathaniel T. Helman
