= MacNeil Mitchell =

New York politician

MacNeil Mitchell (July 18, 1904 – December 17, 1996) was an American lawyer and Republican politician from New York.

== Life ==
He was born on July 18, 1904, in Lime Rock, Litchfield County, Connecticut, the son of George Henry Mitchell and Harriet (MacNeil) Mitchell. He graduated from Yale College in 1926; attended Columbia Law School, and graduated from UC Berkeley School of Law in 1929. He practiced law in New York City. In 1938, he married Katherine McGowin, and they had three children.

Mitchell was a member of the New York State Assembly from 1938 to 1946, sitting in the 161st, 162nd, 163rd, 164th and 165th New York State Legislatures.

He was a member of the New York State Senate (20th district) from 1947 to 1964, sitting in the 166th, 167th, 168th, 169th, 170th, 171st, 172nd, 173rd and 174th New York State Legislatures; and was Chairman of the Committee on the Judiciary in 1963 and 1964.

He was a delegate to the 1960 and 1964 Republican National Conventions.

He died on December 17, 1996, in Cornell Medical Center in Manhattan, of pneumonia; and was buried at the Salisbury Cemetery in Salisbury, Connecticut.

U.S. Patent Commissioner Charles Elliott Mitchell (1837–1911) was his grandfather.

== Sources ==
New York State Assembly
Preceded by Herbert Brownell Jr.	New York State Assembly; New York County, 10th district 1938–1944	Succeeded by John P. Morrissey
Preceded by John J. Lamula	New York State Assembly; New York County, 1st district 1945–1946	Succeeded by Maude E. Ten Eyck
New York State Senate
Preceded by Frederic René Coudert Jr.	New York State Senate; 20th district 1947–1964	Succeeded by Frederic S. Berman
