= Janet Hill Gordon =

American lawyer and politician (1915–1990)

New York State Senate
- In office 1962–1959

New York State Assembly
- In office 1942–1946

Personal details
- Born: Janet Hill; January 11, 1915 New York City, New York, US
- Died: September 17, 1990 (aged 75) Syracuse, New York, US
- Resting place: Mount Hope Cemetery, Norwich, New York
- Education: Syracuse University, BFA; Brooklyn Law School, J.D.
- Profession: Attorney

Janet Hill Gordon (January 11, 1915 – September 17, 1990) was an American attorney and politician. She served in the New York State Legislature and the New York State Senate. She was the first woman to be a county attorney in New York.

== Early life ==
Janet Hill was born in New York City, New York on January 11, 1915. She was the daughter of Florine (née Hall) and James P. Hill. Her father was a lawyer and the presiding Justice of the New York Supreme Court, Appellate Division (3rd Dept.) from 1933 to 1948. She grew up in Norwich, New York.

She graduated from Norwich High School in 1931. She graduated from Syracuse University with a Bachelor of Fine Arts degree, intending to become an illustrator. She was a member of Gamma Phi Beta sorority and Delta Kappa Gamma.

After working for the John Wanamakera department store in New York City where she had hoped to become an advertising illustrator, she attended Brooklyn Law School, graduating magna cum laude in 1940. She became the youngest woman to be admitted to the New York Bar in 1941.

== Career ==
Gordon practiced law in Norwich, New York, for sixty years. She shared a practice with her husband. From 1944 to 1945, she was the Chenango County Attorney, becoming the first woman county attorney in New York. She was a member of the American Bar Association.

Gordon served on the New York Republican State Committee from 1942 to 1946. She was elected to the New York State Assembly for Chenango County, serving from 1947 to 1958 and sitting in the 166th, 167th, 168th, 169th, 170th and 171st assemblies. For her first and second terms, she was sworn in by her father. She was a member of the assembly's Conservation Committee, General Laws Committee, Local Finance Committee, Panel Institutions Committee, and Revision Committee.

Gordon served in the New York State Senate from 1959 to 1962, sitting in the 172nd and 173rd New York State Legislatures. She was a member of the senate's Agriculture Committee, Civil Service and Pensions Committee, Conservation Committee, National Defense and Military Affairs Committee, Public Health Committee, and Taxation Committee. From 1955 to 1962, Gordon was the chairman of the Joint Legislative Committee on Matrimonial and Family Law. She ran for a third term in the Senate, but was defeated.

In November 1962, Gordon unsuccessfully ran for the United States House of Representatives for the 35th District. In 1967, she was a delegate to the New York State Constitutional Convention. From 1967 to 1970, she was a conciliation commissioner for the Sixth Judicial District of the State Conciliation Bureau. She was a delegate to the White House Conference on Children in 1970.

== Honors ==
In 2025, Gordon was added to the inaugural class of the Norwich High School Hall of Fame.

== Personal life ==
During World War II, Hill married William J. Gordon, who was an attorney and became the judge and surrogate of Chenango County. They lived in Norwich, New York. They had one daughter, Gail Hill Gordon (born 1950). At the time, she was the first woman to give birth while serving in a state legislature.

Gordon was a director of the Chenango National Bank and Trust Company of Norwich. She was a member of the American Legion Auxiliary, the Chenango County Pomona Grange, the Daughters of the American Revolution, the Order of the Eastern Star, and the Plymouth Grange. She was a member of the Emmanuel Protestant Episcopal Church.

Gordon died on September 17, 1990, in Upstate Medical Center in Syracuse, New York, of a heart attack. She was buried in the Mount Hope Cemetery in Norwich, New York.

New York State Assembly
Preceded by Irving M. Ives	New York State Assembly; Chenango County; 1947–1958	Succeeded by Guy L. Marvin
New York State Senate
Preceded by Wheeler Milmoe	New York State Senate; 46th District; 1959–1962	Succeeded by Leighton A. Hope
