= Leighton A. Hope =

American politician (1921–1998)

Member of the New York State Senate from the 46th district
- In office January 1, 1963 – December 31, 1965
- Preceded by: Janet Hill Gordon
- Succeeded by: Robert E. Lynch

Personal details
- Born: December 9, 1921 Washington, D.C., U.S.
- Died: February 14, 1998 (aged 76)
- Party: Republican
- Spouse: Polly Pierce Gochenour
- Children: 3
- Parent: Claude Allison Hope (father)
- Education: Taft School; DePauw University
- Profession: Politician

Military service
- Allegiance: United States
- Branch/service: United States Air Force
- Battles/wars: World War II

Leighton A. Hope (December 9, 1921 – February 14, 1998) was an American politician from New York.

== Life ==
He was born on December 9, 1921, in Washington, D.C., the son of Claude Allison Hope (1893–1970). He attended Taft School. During World War II he served in the U.S. Army Air Force. He graduated from DePauw University in 1946. In 1950, he moved to Cortland, New York, and operated radio station WKRT there. He also entered politics as a Republican. He married Polly Pierce Gochenour (born 1924), and they had three sons.

Hope was a member of the New York State Senate (46th D.) from 1963 to 1965, sitting in the 174th and 175th New York State Legislatures. On January 8, 1966, he was appointed as Secretary of the New York State Department of Conservation. Afterwards he was a Deputy New York State Park Commissioner.

He died on February 14, 1998.

The Hope Lake in Virgil, New York, was named in his honor.

== Sources ==
New York State Senate
Preceded by Janet Hill Gordon	New York State Senate; 46th District; 1963–1965	Succeeded by Robert E. Lynch
