= James A. FitzPatrick Nuclear Power Plant =

Nuclear power plant near Oswego, New York

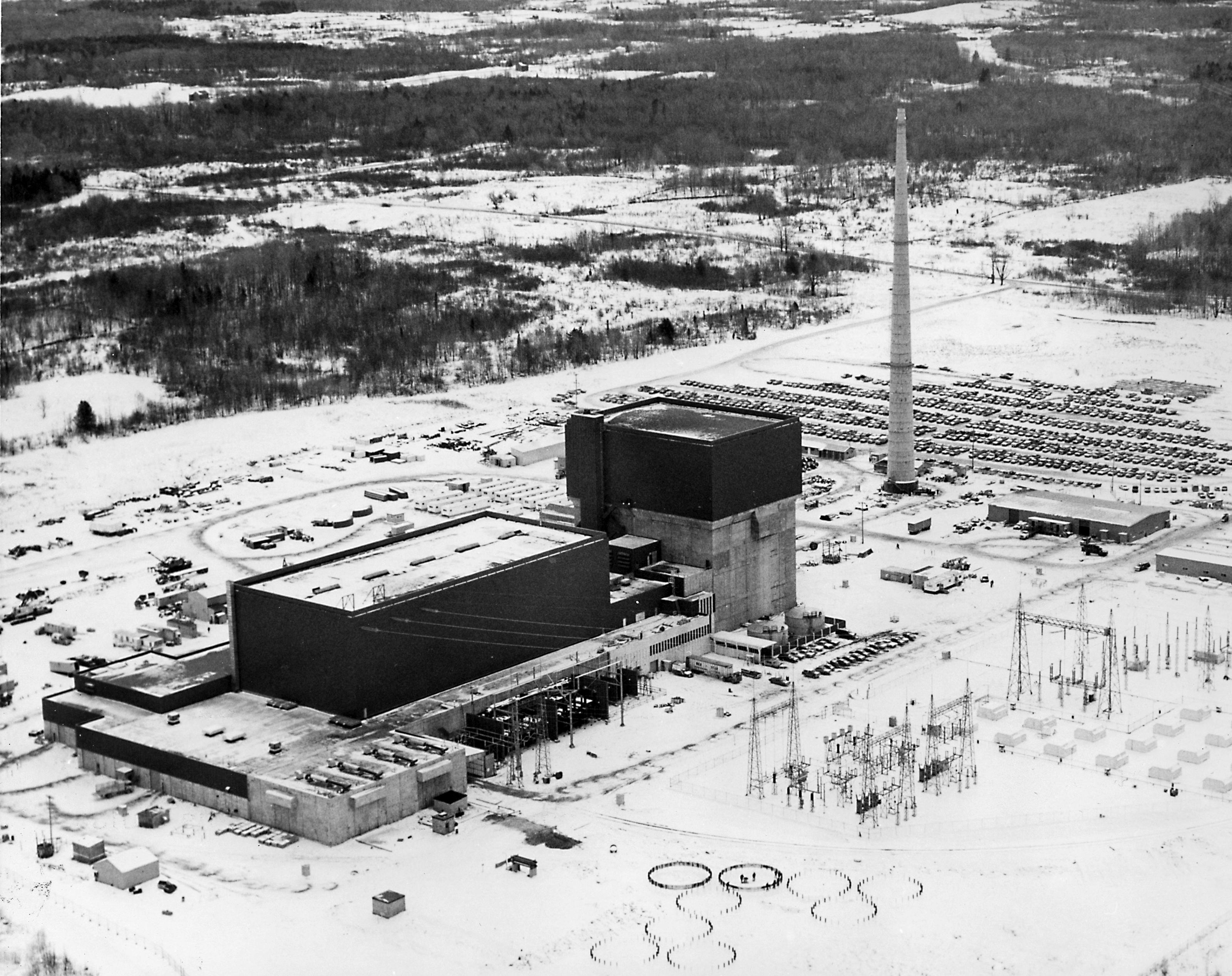
- James A. FitzPatrick Nuclear Power Plant
- Country: United States
- Location: Scriba, Oswego County, near Oswego, New York
- Coordinates: 43°31.4′N 76°23.9′W
- Status: Operational
- Construction began: September 1, 1968
- Commission date: July 28, 1975
- Construction cost: $1.065 billion (2007 USD)
- Owner: Constellation Energy
- Operator: Constellation Energy

Nuclear power station
- Reactor type: BWR
- Reactor supplier: General Electric
- Cooling source: Lake Ontario
- Thermal capacity: 1 × 2536 MW_{th}

Power generation
- Units operational: 1 × 813 MW
- Make and model: BWR-4 (Mark 1)
- Nameplate capacity: 813 MW
- Capacity factor: 86.82% (2017); 77.3% (lifetime)
- Annual net output: 6183 GWh (2017)

External links
- Website: James A. FitzPatrick Nuclear Power Plant
- Commons: Related media on Commons

The James A. FitzPatrick (JAF) Nuclear Power Plant is located in the Town of Scriba, near Oswego, New York, on the southeast shore of Lake Ontario. The nuclear power plant has one General Electric boiling water reactor. The 900-acre (360 ha) site is also the location of two other units at the Nine Mile Point Nuclear Generating Station.

The power plant was originally built by Niagara Mohawk Power Corporation. FitzPatrick and half of the Nine Mile Point site were transferred to the Power Authority of the State of New York (PASNY), now called the New York Power Authority (NYPA). It was named after Power Authority Chairman James A. FitzPatrick, and the NYPA operated the plant until November 2000 when it was sold to Entergy Corporation. On November 2, 2015, Entergy announced its plans to shut down FitzPatrick at the time of its next fuel change in 2016 but instead elected to sell the plant to Exelon Generation for $110 million.

On April 1, 2017, Exelon's generation division, Constellation Energy assumed ownership and continues to operate the plant.

== Surrounding population ==
The Nuclear Regulatory Commission defines two emergency planning zones around nuclear power plants: a plume exposure pathway zone with a radius of 10 miles (16 km), concerned primarily with exposure to, and inhalation of, airborne radioactive contamination, and an ingestion pathway zone of about 50 miles (80 km), concerned primarily with ingestion of food and liquid contaminated by radioactivity.

The 2010 U.S. population within 10 miles (16 km) of FitzPatrick was 35,136, an increase of 17.0 percent in a decade, according to an analysis of U.S. Census data for msnbc.com. The 2010 U.S. population within 50 miles (80 km) was 909,798, an increase of 3.2 percent since 2000. Cities within 50 miles include Syracuse (36 miles to city center). Canadian population is not included in these figures, such as Kingston, Ontario, 49 miles to the city center.

== Seismic risk ==
The Nuclear Regulatory Commission's estimate of the risk each year of an earthquake intense enough to cause core damage to the reactor at FitzPatrick was 1 in 163,934, according to an NRC study published in August 2010.

== Announced closure ==
On November 2, 2015, Entergy Corporation announced that it intended to close the James A. FitzPatrick Nuclear Power Plant because it is becoming too costly to operate. The nuclear industry's profits had been squeezed out by cheaper energy from natural gas plants. "Given the financial challenges our merchant power plants face from sustained wholesale power price declines and other unfavorable market conditions, we have been assessing each asset," Chief Executive Officer Leo Denault said in the statement. "Market conditions require us to also close the FitzPatrick nuclear plant."

In 2016, Cuomo directed the Public Service Commission to consider ratepayer-financed subsidies similar to those for renewable sources to keep carbon free nuclear power stations profitable in the competition against carbon based natural gas.

In August 2016, Exelon agreed to buy the plant pending regulatory approval and formally acquired ownership and operation on March 31, 2017.

== Electricity production ==
Generation (MWh) of James A. FitzPatrick Nuclear Power Plant
Year	Jan	Feb	Mar	Apr	May	Jun	Jul	Aug	Sep	Oct	Nov	Dec	Annual (Total)
2001	597,968	597,968	509,185	595,092	619,284	599,220	612,745	602,328	568,545	593,355	599,600	625,670	7,120,960
2002	621,431	562,360	609,315	601,263	610,755	525,900	606,748	604,562	577,833	76,459	559,592	629,316	6,585,534
2003	607,100	477,671	440,371	609,042	628,627	606,649	620,585	533,662	581,680	628,339	602,262	629,917	6,565,905
2004	626,620	511,118	599,961	601,822	621,004	596,663	593,341	523,177	410,343	122,108	612,230	637,537	6,055,924
2005	623,299	575,732	637,362	615,503	611,251	605,551	341,740	615,909	545,209	632,303	613,884	633,488	7,045,231
2006	623,636	573,222	629,548	583,621	627,680	609,240	619,587	616,671	585,962	140,831	508,101	640,170	6,758,269
2007	639,284	542,849	637,738	617,189	584,379	615,692	630,361	561,609	542,769	477,499	430,705	638,276	6,918,350
2008	611,178	596,709	635,678	523,100	599,707	604,352	584,963	606,886	250,801	422,111	618,103	637,317	6,290,905
2009	623,093	571,825	636,975	591,987	635,258	612,763	628,418	621,154	604,523	634,498	616,268	621,312	7,397,072
2010	632,313	540,686	627,170	564,123	618,763	594,667	603,544	551,272	200,852	261,832	536,709	629,552	6,361,483
2011	616,045	569,714	609,653	602,196	593,796	601,251	616,003	615,121	599,542	628,561	606,268	585,846	7,244,996
2012	581,329	587,033	624,134	568,936	624,685	573,942	598,563	596,352	265,314	217,963	214,439	617,836	6,070,526
2013	629,859	550,803	476,716	611,141	591,758	455,245	605,452	591,505	521,294	612,648	586,535	606,866	6,839,822
2014	607,587	522,494	576,116	569,537	590,926	451,497	513,760	364,577	0	389,025	614,072	629,103	5,828,694
2015	629,345	573,014	633,663	611,799	633,889	611,642	615,205	610,411	591,840	627,095	611,874	632,460	7,381,237
2016	460,731	579,127	629,672	602,817	629,112	459,963	392,503	474,401	448,474	459,076	387,335	350,915	5,273,126
2017	133,463	48,057	616,848	548,238	601,890	601,601	611,525	580,556	594,858	626,179	577,977	633,032	6,174,224
2018	634,103	566,493	629,921	611,683	548,101	588,609	575,493	526,735	140,864	456,819	614,460	634,500	7,027,781
2019	634,323	572,376	612,362	611,980	626,571	608,087	611,954	609,104	601,328	625,999	610,765	630,257	7,354,106
2020	613,124	391,146	624,651	608,367	626,146	598,314	602,963	564,094	202,485	516,827	615,471	625,088	6,488,676
2021	635,106	573,588	629,668	614,060	632,815	604,689	622,585	615,430	618,205	626,443	609,344	634,130	7,415,063
2022	633,425	552,986	626,134	605,064	619,020	588,019	585,888	514,810	368,412	277,252	608,559	633,176	6,612,745
2023	633,624	572,516	629,408	612,198	628,822	603,351	614,162	614,427	598,617	626,139	612,650	627,155	7,072,069
2024	633,398	592,363	629,119	611,157	627,012	597,678	608,457	394,690	226,629	626,359	611,602	631,227	6,789,691
2025	635,993	574,410	634,570	609,032	634,511	609,663	610,961	620,631	600,438	631,375	612,462	635,160	7,409,206
2026	635,384	573,296	610,249	612,797	629,664	595,061	611,371	556,387					--

== See also ==
- Darlington Nuclear Generating Station — located on the opposite side of Lake Ontario
- List of nuclear reactors
- New York energy law
- Nuclear power
- Nuclear power plant
- Pickering Nuclear Generating Station — located on the opposite side of Lake Ontario
