= William F. Condon =

American politician

William F. Condon (September 29, 1897 – March 19, 1972) was an American politician from New York.

== Life ==
He was born on September 29, 1897, in Yonkers, New York. He attended New York Preparatory School. From 1917 to 1919, he served in the Yonkers Naval Militia. Later he became a contractor.

Condon was a member of the New York State Assembly (Westchester Co., 5th D.) in 1928, 1929, 1930, 1931, 1932, 1933, 1934 and 1935.

He was Register of Westchester County from 1936 to 1938.

He was a member of the New York State Senate from 1939 to 1964, sitting in the 162nd, 163rd, 164th, 165th, 166th, 167th, 168th, 169th, 170th, 171st, 172nd, 173rd and 174th New York State Legislatures. In 1947, he co-sponsored the Condon-Wadlin Act which prohibited public employees to strike. Repealed in 1967, the Act was replaced by the Public Employees Fair Employment Act,

In November 1964, he ran for re-election, but was defeated by Democrat Royden A. Letsen.

He died on March 19, 1972, in Yonkers, New York.

== Sources ==
New York State Assembly
Preceded by Arthur I. Miller	New York State Assembly; Westchester County, 5th District; 1928–1935	Succeeded by William T. Grieve
New York State Senate
Preceded by James A. Garrity	New York State Senate; 26th District; 1939–1944	Succeeded by Isidore Dollinger
Preceded by Arthur H. Wicks	New York State Senate; 29th District; 1945–1954	Succeeded by Francis J. McCaffrey
Preceded by Thomas C. Desmond	New York State Senate; 32nd District; 1955–1964	Succeeded by Royden A. Letsen
