= Bernard C. McDonnell =

American lawyer and politician

Bernard C. McDonnell (1911 – August 1, 1959) was an American lawyer and politician from New York.

== Life ==
He was born in 1911. He attended St. Jerome's School, All Hallows High School, and Georgetown University. He graduated from New York University School of Law in 1934. He was admitted to the bar in 1935, and practiced law in New York City.

McDonnell was elected on February 17, 1948, to the New York State Assembly (Bronx Co., 1st D.), to fill the vacancy caused by the appointment of Patrick J. Fogarty to the Domestic Relations Court. McDonnell was re-elected several times, and remained in the Assembly until his death in 1959, sitting in the 166th, 167th, 168th, 169th, 170th, 171st and 172nd New York State Legislatures.

He died on August 1, 1959, at his home at 262 Alexander Avenue in the Bronx;

== Sources ==
New York State Assembly
Preceded by Patrick J. Fogarty	New York State Assembly; Bronx County, 1st District; 1949–1959	Succeeded by Donald J. Sullivan
