= Benjamin F. Feinberg =

American politician (1888–1959)

Benjamin Franklin Feinberg (October 23, 1888 – February 6, 1959) was an American lawyer and politician from New York. He was temporary president of the New York State Senate from 1944 to 1949.

== Life ==
He was born on October 23, 1888, in Malone, Franklin County, New York. Later, he lived in Plattsburgh.

He was a member of the New York State Senate from 1933 to 1949, sitting in the 156th, 157th, 158th, 159th, 160th, 161st, 162nd, 163rd, 164th, 165th, 166th, and 167th New York State Legislatures; and was temporary president from 1944 to 1949.

He was a delegate to the New York State Constitutional Convention of 1938. He was an alternate delegate to the 1940 Republican National Convention, and a delegate to the 1944 and 1948 Republican National Conventions.

== Feinberg Law ==
In 1949, he sponsored the Feinberg Bill, an act to purge communist and fellow traveler teachers from the state public-school system. The bill required the Regents of the State School Board to draw up a list of all subversive organizations. Membership in such organizations was sufficient grounds for summary removal. Although the law focused on organizational membership, in its implementation it would delve into people's reading preferences, social activities, rallies attended, petitions signed, and beliefs on current political issues. The regents were also empowered to dismiss school employees for the "utterance of any treasonable or seditious word ... or the doing of any treasonable or seditious act" regardless of their affiliations. The law was struck down in 1967 as unconstitutional in its violations of individual liberties.

== Later career ==
On March 30, 1949, Feinberg was appointed chairman of the New York State Public Service Commission, and remained in office until 1958.

== Legacy and death ==
Feinberg was instrumental in the founding of the State University of New York, and the library at SUNY Plattsburgh is named after him.

He died on February 6, 1959, in Royal Victoria Hospital in Montreal, Quebec, Canada, of kidney disease.

New York State Senate
Preceded by Henry E. H. Brereton	New York State Senate; 33rd District; 1933–1944	Succeeded by Frederic H. Bontecou
Preceded by G. Frank Wallace	New York State Senate; 38th District; 1945–1949	Succeeded by Henry Neddo
Political offices
Preceded by Joe R. Hanley	Temporary President of the New York State Senate; 1944–1949	Succeeded by Arthur H. Wicks
