= Isidore Dollinger =

American politician

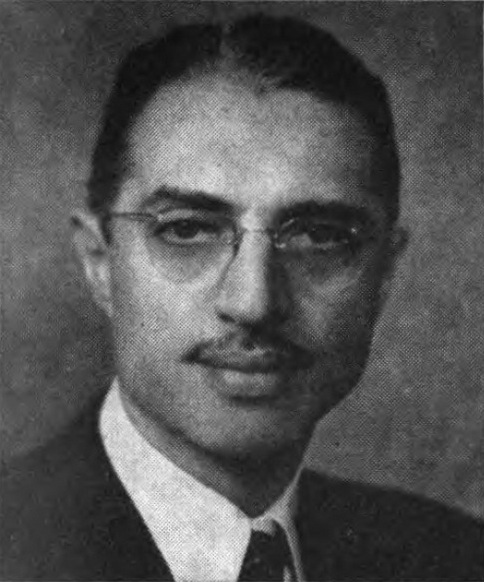

Justice of the New York Supreme Court
- In office 1969–1975

Bronx County District Attorney
- In office January 1, 1960 – December 31, 1968
- Preceded by: Daniel V. Sullivan
- Succeeded by: Burton B. Roberts

Member of the U.S. House of Representatives from New York
- In office January 3, 1949 – December 31, 1959
- Preceded by: Leo Isacson
- Succeeded by: Jacob H. Gilbert
- Constituency: 24th district (1949–53); 23rd district (1953–59)

Member of the New York Senate from the 26th district
- In office January 1, 1945 – December 31, 1948
- Preceded by: William F. Condon
- Succeeded by: Louis Bennett

Member of the New York State Assembly from the 4th Bronx district
- In office January 1, 1937 – December 31, 1944
- Preceded by: Samuel Weisman
- Succeeded by: Matthew J. H. McLaughlin

Personal details
- Born: November 13, 1903 New York City, U.S.
- Died: January 30, 2000 (aged 96) White Plains, New York, U.S.
- Party: Democratic
- Spouse: Rose
- Children: Edmund Dollinger
- Education: New York University; New York Law School

Isidore Dollinger (November 13, 1903 – January 30, 2000) was an American lawyer, jurist, and politician who served six terms in the U.S. House of Representatives, representing New York from 1949 to 1959.

== Life ==
Dollinger was born on November 13, 1903, in New York City. He graduated from New York University in 1925, and from New York Law School in 1928. He was admitted to the bar in 1929.

== State assembly ==
He was a member of the New York State Assembly (Bronx County, 4th District) in 1937, 1938, 1939–40, 1941–42 and 1943–44.

He was a member of the New York State Senate (26th District) from 1945 to 1948, sitting in the 165th and 166th New York State Legislatures.

=== Congress ===
Dollinger was elected as a Democrat to the 81st, 82nd, 83rd, 84th, 85th and 86th United States Congresses, holding office from January 3, 1949, to December 31, 1959, when he resigned to take office as District Attorney of Bronx County.

=== New York Supreme Court ===
He was a Justice of New York Supreme Court (1st District) from 1969 to 1973, and an Official Referee (i.e. a senior judge on an additional seat) of the Supreme Court from 1974 to 1975.

== Death ==
He died on January 30, 2000, in White Plains, New York.

== See also ==
- List of Jewish members of the United States Congress

New York State Assembly
Preceded by Samuel Weisman	New York State Assembly; Bronx County, 4th District; 1937–1944	Succeeded by Matthew J. H. McLaughlin
New York State Senate
Preceded by William F. Condon	New York State Senate; 26th District; 1945–1948	Succeeded by Louis Bennett
U.S. House of Representatives
Preceded by Leo Isacson	Member of the U.S. House of Representatives from New York's 24th congressional district 1949–1953	Succeeded by Charles A. Buckley
Preceded by Sidney A. Fine	Member of the U.S. House of Representatives from New York's 23rd congressional district 1953–1959	Succeeded by Jacob H. Gilbert
Legal offices
Preceded by Daniel V. Sullivan	Bronx County District Attorney; 1960–1968	Succeeded by Burton B. Roberts
