= Samuel Rabin =

American judge

Samuel Rabin (1905 – May 7, 1993) was an American lawyer and politician.

== Life ==
He was born in 1905 in Manhattan, New York City. He graduated from Cornell University, and in 1928 from New York University School of Law. He was admitted to the bar, and practiced law in Jamaica, Queens. In 1938, he married Florence Mittlemann, and they had two children. He entered politics as a Republican.

He was a member of the New York State Assembly (Queens Co., 8th D.) from 1945 to 1954, sitting in the 165th, 166th, 167th, 168th and 169th New York State Legislatures.

In 1954, he was elected to the New York Supreme Court, and re-elected in 1968. From 1962 on, he sat on the Appellate Division (2nd Dept.), and Presiding Justice from 1971 on.

In January 1974, he was appointed by Governor Malcolm Wilson to the New York Court of Appeals, to fill the vacancy caused by the resignation of Adrian P. Burke. In June 1974, he was designated by the Republican State Committee to run for one of the vacancies on the Court of Appeals but he declined to run, being already 69 years old, just one year short of the constitutional age limit. In 1975, he returned to the Appellate Division, and retired from the bench in 1981. Afterwards he resumed the practice of law.

He died on May 7, 1993, in Floral Park, Queens. Rabin, who was Jewish, was buried in Montefiore Cemetery.

== Sources ==
- The History of the New York Court of Appeals, 1932-2003 by Bernard S. Meyer, Burton C. Agata & Seth H. Agata (page 29)

New York State Assembly
Preceded by new district	New York State Assembly; Queens County, 8th District; 1945–1954	Succeeded by ?
