= Robert Walmsley (New York) =

American politician and lawyer (c. 1885–1979)

Member of the New York State Assembly from the Rockland County district
- In office 1942–1960

Personal details
- Born: c. 1885
- Died: June 29, 1979 New York City, New York, U.S.
- Party: Republican
- Education: Columbia University; Harvard Law School
- Occupation: Lawyer, banker, politician

Robert Walmsley (c. 1885 – June 29, 1979) was an American lawyer, banker, and Republican politician from New York. He served in the New York State Assembly from 1942 to 1960, representing Nyack and Rockland County.

== Early life and education ==
Walmsley graduated from Columbia University and earned his law degree from Harvard Law School. Prior to and alongside his political career, he worked as an attorney and banker.
