= George F. Dannebrock =

American politician

Member of the New York State Assembly from Erie's 6th district
- In office January 1, 1945 – December 31, 1960
- Preceded by: Jerome C. Kreinheder
- Succeeded by: Albert J. Hausbeck

Personal details
- Born: March 28, 1906 Buffalo, New York
- Died: July 27, 1989 (aged 83)
- Party: Republican

George F. Dannebrock (March 28, 1906 – July 27, 1989) was an American politician who served in the New York State Assembly from Erie's 6th district from 1945 to 1960.
