= John L. Ostrander =

American politician

Member of the New York State Assembly from the Saratoga district
- In office January 1, 1946 – December 31, 1962
- Preceded by: Richard J. Sherman
- Succeeded by: Stanley L. Van Rensselaer

Personal details
- Born: July 15, 1908 Schuylerville, New York
- Died: June 29, 1988 (aged 79)
- Party: Republican

John L. Ostrander (July 15, 1908 – June 29, 1988) was an American politician who served in the New York State Assembly from the Saratoga district from 1946 to 1962.
