= Senator Burney =

Senator Burney may refer to:

- Charles O. Burney Jr. (1907–1972), New York State Senate
- Dwight Burney (1892–1987), Nebraska State Senate
