= Senator Pino =

Senator Pino may refer to:

- Frank J. Pino (1909–2007), New York State Senate
- Jerry Ortiz y Pino (born 1942), New Mexico Senate
