= Fred S. Hollowell =

American farmer and politician (1883–1960)

Member of the New York State Senate
- In office 1945–1952
- Preceded by: Earle S. Warner
- Succeeded by: Harry K. Morton

Member of the New York State Assembly
- In office 1932–1945
- Preceded by: Edwin C. Nutt
- Succeeded by: Vernon W. Blodgett

Personal details
- Born: January 18, 1883 Milo, New York, U.S.
- Died: April 19, 1960 (aged 77) Milo, New York, U.S.
- Resting place: Lakeview Cemetery, Penn Yan, New York, U.S.
- Party: Republican
- Spouse: Eleanor Brundage (m. 1909)
- Children: 3
- Occupation: Politician, farmer, educator

Fred S. Hollowell (January 18, 1883 – April 19, 1960) was an American farmer and politician from New York.

== Life ==
He was born on January 18, 1883, at his family's farm in Milo, Yates County, New York. On July 21, 1909, he married Eleanor Brundage (1883–1979), and they had three children. He was a school principal in Leicester, Heuvelton and Kingston until 1914, when he returned to take care of the family farm.

Hollowell was a member of the New York State Assembly (Yates Co.) in 1932, 1933, 1934, 1935, 1936, 1937, 1938, 1939–40, 1941–42, 1943–44 and 1945. He was Chairman of the Committee on Excise from 1936 to 1938.

On March 6, 1945, he was elected to the New York State Senate (48th D.), to fill the vacancy caused by the resignation of Earle S. Warner. Hollowell was re-elected three times and remained in the State Senate until 1952, sitting in the 165th, 166th, 167th and 168th New York State Legislatures.

He died on April 19, 1960, at his farm in Milo, New York, of a heart attack; and was buried at the Lakeview Cemetery in Penn Yan.

== Sources ==
New York State Assembly
Preceded by Edwin C. Nutt	New York State Assembly; Yates County; 1932–1945	Succeeded by Vernon W. Blodgett
New York State Senate
Preceded by Earle S. Warner	New York State Senate; 48th District; 1945–1952	Succeeded by Harry K. Morton
