= Earle S. Warner =

American politician (1880–1971)

Justice of the New York Supreme Court
- In office 1945–1950

Member of the New York State Senate from the 48th district
- In office January 1, 1945 – January 22, 1945
- Preceded by: Walter J. Mahoney
- Succeeded by: Fred S. Hollowell

Member of the New York State Senate from the 43rd district
- In office January 1, 1933 – December 31, 1944
- Preceded by: Leon F. Wheatley
- Succeeded by: Richard P. Byrne

Personal details
- Born: Earle Spear Warner; August 12, 1880 Phelps, New York, U.S.
- Died: December 1971 (aged 91)
- Party: Republican
- Spouse: Selma L. Holbrook (m. 1907)
- Education: Hobart College (BLitt); Cornell University (LLB)
- Occupation: Politician, lawyer

Earle Spear Warner (August 12, 1880 – December 1971) was an American lawyer and politician from New York.

== Life ==
He was born on August 17, 1880, on a farm in the Town of Phelps, Ontario County, New York, the son of Henry D. Warner (1844–1908) and Frances Belle (Spear) Warner. He graduated B.Litt. from Hobart College in 1902, and LL.B. from Cornell Law School in 1905. He was admitted to the bar the same year, and practiced in Phelps. On November 26, 1907, he married Selma L. Holbrook (born 1885). In 1908, he was appointed as Attorney of the Village of Phelps and held this office until 1945.

Warner was a member of the New York State Senate from 1933 to 1945, sitting in the 156th, 157th, 158th, 159th, 160th, 161st, 162nd, 163rd, 164th and 165th New York State Legislature. He was a delegate to the 1940 Republican National Convention. He resigned his senate seat on January 22, 1945, and was appointed to the New York Supreme Court.

He was a justice of the Supreme Court (7th D.) from 1945 to 1950, and an Official Referee (i.e. a senior judge on an additional seat) of the Supreme Court from 1951 to 1956. In June 1954, he decided to annul a marriage after thirteen years, and give custody of the two daughters to the wife, because the husband had committed a fraud by hiding from his wife his belief in communism.

He died in December 1971.

== Sources ==
New York State Senate
Preceded by Leon F. Wheatley	New York State Senate; 43rd District; 1933–1944	Succeeded by Richard P. Byrne
Preceded by Walter J. Mahoney	New York State Senate; 48th District; 1945	Succeeded by Fred S. Hollowell
