= Henry W. Griffith =

American businessman and politician (1897–1956)

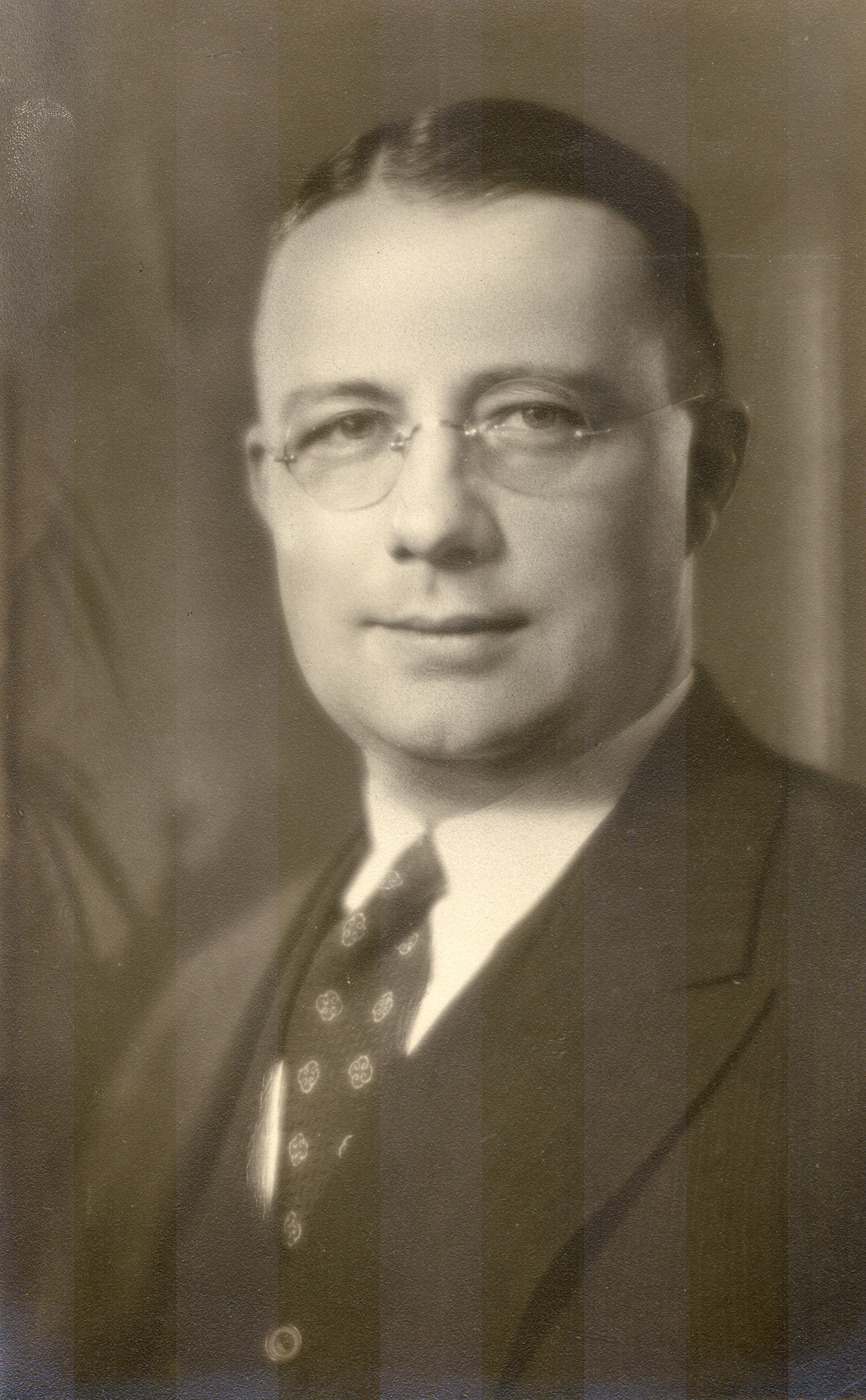

Member of the New York State Senate from the 47th district
- In office January 1, 1945 – December 31, 1950
- Preceded by: William Bewley
- Succeeded by: George R. Metcalf

Member of the New York State Senate from the 42nd district
- In office January 1, 1939 – December 31, 1944
- Preceded by: Charles J. Hewitt
- Succeeded by: Isaac B. Mitchell

Personal details
- Born: Henry Watson Griffith; January 11, 1897 Palmyra, New York, U.S.
- Died: July 21, 1956 (aged 59) Ontario, Canada
- Party: Republican
- Spouse: Agnes Stuart McLouth (m. 1925)
- Children: 4
- Parent: Frederick W. Griffith (father)
- Education: Hamilton College
- Occupation: Politician, businessman, newspaper publisher

Military service
- Allegiance: United States
- Branch/service: United States Army
- Rank: Second lieutenant

Henry Watson Griffith (January 11, 1897 – July 21, 1956) was an American businessman, newspaper publisher and politician from New York.

== Life ==
He was born on January 11, 1897, in Palmyra, Wayne County, New York, the son of State Senator Frederick W. Griffith (1858–1928) and Mary (Adams) Griffith. He graduated from Palmyra High School in 1914, and in absentia from Hamilton College in 1918. During World War I he was a second lieutenant of field artillery of the U.S. Army. In 1925, he married Agnes Stuart McLouth (1899-1986) and built his bride a home at 353 Canandaigua Street in Palmyra, New York. They had four daughters: Mary Adams Griffith (1928-2007); Carolyn McLouth Griffith (1930-1998); Agnes Elizabeth Griffith (1931-2023); and Margaret Malette Griffith (1933-2018). He published the Palmyra Courier–Journal, a weekly newspaper.

Griffith was a member of the New York State Senate from 1939 to 1950, sitting in the 162nd, 163rd, 164th, 165th, 166th and 167th New York State Legislatures. In 1950, he ran for re-nomination, but was defeated in the Republican primary by George R. Metcalf.

He died on July 21, 1956, while on a fishing trip at his lodge on Weslemkoon Lake in Ontario, Canada, of a heart attack.

== Sources ==
New York State Senate
Preceded by Charles J. Hewitt	New York State Senate; 42nd District; 1939–1944	Succeeded by Isaac B. Mitchell
Preceded by William Bewley	New York State Senate; 47th District; 1945–1950	Succeeded by George R. Metcalf
