= Clifford C. Hastings =

American electrical engineer, businessman and politician

Clifford Cornelius Hastings (June 25, 1882 – September 28, 1946) was an American electrical engineer, businessman and politician from New York.

== Life ==
He was born on June 25, 1882, in Rensselaer County, New York, the son of Milon S. Hastings and Edith R. (Snyder) Hastings. He attended the public schools, and then learned electrical engineering by correspondence course. He worked for the Troy City Railway Company, and later for United Traction. In his leisure time, he built a hydro-electric power station in West Sand Lake. He incorporated the Wynantskill Hydro-Electric Company, and supplied electric light to the surrounding areas. He was President of the company until 1926 when he sold out, and retired from business.

He then entered politics as a Republican, and was Supervisor of the Town of Sand Lake from 1927 to 1936.

Hastings was a member of the New York State Senate (31st D.) from 1937 to 1944, sitting in the 160th, 161st, 162nd, 163rd and 164th New York State Legislatures. On June 3, 1944, he was appointed by Gov. Thomas E. Dewey as Treasurer of Rensselaer County, to fill the vacancy caused by the resignation of Avery G. Hall. In November 1944, he was elected to a full term, and remained in office until his death.

He died on September 28, 1946, at his home in West Sand Lake, New York.

== Sources ==
New York State Senate
Preceded by Ogden J. Ross	New York State Senate; 31st District; 1937–1944	Succeeded by Pliny W. Williamson
