= Hanford Struble =

American politician

Member of the New York State Assembly from Yates County
- In office 1875–1875
- Preceded by: George William Spencer Lyttelton
- Succeeded by: John Southerland

Personal details
- Born: May 14, 1842 Milo, New York, U.S.
- Died: October 25, 1903 (aged 61) Penn Yan, New York, U.S.
- Resting place: Lake View Cemetery, Penn Yan, New York
- Party: Republican
- Education: Genesee College, Albany Law School
- Occupation: Lawyer, judge, politician

Military service
- Branch/service: Union Army
- Years of service: 1862–1865
- Rank: Brevet Major
- Unit: 148th New York Infantry Regiment
- Battles/wars: American Civil War

Hanford Struble (May 14, 1842 – October 25, 1903) was an American lawyer, politician, and judge from New York.

== Early life and education ==
Struble was born on May 14, 1842, in Milo, New York, the son of Levi Struble and Mary Misner. He grew up on a farm.

Struble attended the Starkey Seminary from 1853 to 1857, followed by Genesee College, where he graduated with honors in 1861. From 1861 to 1862, he worked as principal of Dundee Academy.

== Military service ==
In July 1862, during the American Civil War, Struble enlisted in Company B of the 148th New York Infantry Regiment and was chosen as first lieutenant. A few months later, he was appointed to General Egbert Viele's staff with the rank of major and served as provost-marshal of Portsmouth, Virginia. He later served as provost-marshal in Norfolk and was successively on the staff of Generals Barnes, Potter, Wild, and Voges. Struble then became a permanent aide on General George F. Shipley's staff. In February 1865, he was on duty before Richmond under General Weitzel and entered the city with President Lincoln on April 3, 1865. He was discharged from service in July 1865, ending his military service with the rank of Brevet Major.

== Legal and political career ==
After the war, Struble spent a year studying law under James Spicer in Dundee. He then attended Albany Law School, graduating in 1868. He began practicing law in Penn Yan with Abraham V. Harpending. When Harpending died in 1871, Struble practiced law on his own until forming a partnership with Charles Baker. In 1877, he formed a partnership with James Spicer, which lasted until Spicer moved to Dundee.

Struble was elected District Attorney of Yates County in 1868 and re-elected in 1871. In 1874, he was elected to the New York State Assembly as a Republican, representing Yates County. He served in the Assembly in 1875. He was also clerk of the Board of Supervisors in 1868 and 1869, and in 1869, he was chosen chairman of the Republican County Committee, a position he held for several years. In 1883, he was elected county judge and surrogate, a position he was re-elected to in 1889. He served as county judge until 1896.

== Personal life ==
Struble was a charter member and commander of the local Grand Army of the Republic post. He was also a member of the Freemasons. In 1868, he married Laura Backus. They had one child, Clinton Backus Struble.

== Death ==
Struble died at home from Bright's disease on October 25, 1903. He was buried in Lake View Cemetery.

New York State Assembly
| Preceded by George W. Spencer | New York State Assembly; Yates County; 1875 | Succeeded by John Southerland |
