= S. Wentworth Horton =

American politician

Schuyler Wentworth Horton

Member of the New York State Senate from the 1st district
- In office January 1, 1947 – December 31, 1956
- Preceded by: W. Kingsland Macy
- Succeeded by: Elisha T. Barrett

Personal details
- Born: October 16, 1885 Greenport, Suffolk County, New York
- Died: October 2, 1960 (aged 74) Patchogue, New York
- Party: Republican
- Education: Syracuse University

Schuyler Wentworth Horton (October 16, 1885 – October 2, 1960) was an American businessman and politician from New York.

== Life ==
He was born on October 16, 1885, in Greenport, Suffolk County, New York. He attended Greenport High School and Syracuse University. He was a funeral director. He married Martha Mattice (1901–1984), and they had two sons: David Barnabas Horton (1932–2010) and Stewart Horton.

Horton was a member of the New York State Senate (1st D.) from January 1, 1947 to December 31, 1956, sitting in the 166th, 167th, 168th, 169th and 170th New York State Legislatures.

He was an alternate delegate to the 1948 Republican National Convention.

He died on October 2, 1960, in the South Shore Convalescent Home in Patchogue, New York; and was buried at the Central Cemetery in Orient.

== Sources ==
New York State Senate
Preceded by W. Kingsland Macy	Member of the New York State Senate from the 1st district January 1, 1947 – December 31, 1956	Succeeded by Elisha T. Barrett
