= Mortimer A. Cullen =

American politician

Mortimer Aloysius Cullen (January 15, 1891 – June 26, 1954) was an American politician from New York.

== Life ==
He was born on January 15, 1891, in Harvel, Illinois. He attended school and high school in St. Johnsville, New York. In 1913, he went to live in Albany. He worked for the New York Central Railroad. On February 26, 1916, he married Flora Argersinger, and they had several children.

Cullen was a member of the New York State Assembly (Albany Co., 2nd D.) from 1941 to 1944, sitting in the 163rd and 164th New York State Legislatures, and a member of the New York State Senate (35th D.) in 1945 and 1946. He was Fire Commissioner of Albany from May 1947 until his death in 1954.

He died on June 26, 1954, in St. Peter's Hospital in Albany, New York.

== Sources ==
New York State Assembly
| Preceded by John P. Hayes | New York State Assembly; Albany County, 2nd District; 1941–1944 | Succeeded by George W. Foy |
New York State Senate
| Preceded by Fred A. Young | New York State Senate; 35th District; 1945–1946 | Succeeded by Peter J. Dalessandro |
