= Pliny W. Williamson =

American politician (1876–1958)

Member of the New York State Senate from the 31st district
- In office January 1, 1945 – October 31, 1958
- Preceded by: Clifford C. Hastings
- Succeeded by: George W. Cornell

Member of the New York State Senate from the 25th district
- In office January 1, 1935 – December 31, 1944
- Preceded by: Walter W. Westall
- Succeeded by: Carl Pack

Personal details
- Born: Pliny Wilson Williamson; September 24, 1876 Russellville, Ohio, U.S.
- Died: October 21, 1958 (aged 82) Scarsdale, New York, U.S.
- Party: Republican
- Spouse: Jane Louise Humes (m. 1904; died 1941)
- Children: 2
- Education: Oberlin College; Columbia University
- Occupation: Politician, lawyer

Pliny Wilson Williamson (September 24, 1876 – October 21, 1958) was an American lawyer and politician from New York.

== Life ==
He was born on September 24, 1876, in Russellville, Brown County, Ohio, the son of Albert M. Williamson and Emma (Salisbury) Williamson. He graduated from Steele High School in Dayton, Ohio; from Oberlin College; and from Columbia Law School in 1903. He practiced law in New York City. In 1904, he married Jane Louise Humes (died 1941), and they had two children.

Among his clients were the Wright brothers and the Wright Company.

He was Supervisor of the Town of Scarsdale from 1929 to 1934; and was Majority Leader of the Board of Supervisors of Westchester County until 1931.

Williamson was a member of the New York State Senate from 1935 until his death in 1958, sitting in the 158th, 159th, 160th, 161st, 162nd, 163rd, 164th, 165th, 166th, 167th, 168th, 169th, 170th and 171st New York State Legislatures.

He died on October 21, 1958, at his home in Scarsdale, New York.

== Sources ==
New York State Senate
| Preceded by Walter W. Westall | New York State Senate; 25th District; 1935–1944 | Succeeded by Carl Pack |
| Preceded by Clifford C. Hastings | New York State Senate; 31st District; 1945–1958 | Succeeded by George W. Cornell |
