= 164th New York State Legislature =

New York state legislative session

←	163rd	165th	→
- New York State Capitol (2009)

Overview
- Legislative body: New York State Legislature
- Jurisdiction: New York, United States
- Term: January 1, 1943 – December 31, 1944

Senate
- Members: 51
- President: Lt. Gov. Thomas W. Wallace (R), until July 17, 1943; Lt. Gov. Joe R. Hanley [1944]
- Temporary President: Joe R. Hanley (R) [1943]; Benjamin F. Feinberg (R) [1944]
- Party control: Republican (31–20)

Assembly
- Members: 150
- Speaker: Oswald D. Heck (R)
- Party control: Republican (90–59–1)

Sessions
- 1st: January 6 – March 26, 1943
- 2nd: January 5 – March 18, 1944
- 3rd: October 30, 1944 –

The 164th New York State Legislature, consisting of the New York State Senate and the New York State Assembly, met from January 6, 1943, to October 30, 1944, during the first and second years of Thomas E. Dewey's governorship, in Albany.

== Background ==
Under the provisions of the New York Constitution of 1894, re-apportioned in 1917, and amended in 1937, 51 Senators and 150 assemblymen were elected in single-seat districts for two-year terms. The senatorial districts consisted either of one or more entire counties; or a contiguous area within a single county. The counties which were divided into more than one senatorial district were New York (nine districts), Kings (eight), Bronx (three), Erie (three), Monroe (two), Queens (two) and Westchester (two). The Assembly districts were made up of contiguous area, all within the same county.

At this time there were two major political parties: the Republican Party and the Democratic Party. The American Labor Party, the Communist Party, the Socialist Party and the Socialist Labor Party (running under the name of "Industrial Government Party") also nominated tickets.

== Elections ==
The 1942 New York state election was held on November 3. Thomas E. Dewey and Thomas W. Wallace were elected Governor and Lieutenant Governor, both Republicans. Of the other four statewide elective offices, three were also carried by Republicans, and one by a Democrat with American Labor endorsement. The approximate party strength at this election, as expressed by the vote for Governor, was: Republicans 2,149,000; Democrats 1,501,000; American Labor 404,000; Communists 45,000; Socialists 22,000; and Industrial Government 3,500.

All four women legislators—State Senator Rhoda Fox Graves (Rep.), of Gouverneur; and Assemblywomen Jane H. Todd (Rep.), of Tarrytown; Edith C. Cheney (Rep.), of Corning; and Mary A. Gillen (Dem.), of Brooklyn—were re-elected.

Lt. Gov. Thomas W. Wallace died on July 17, 1943.

The 1943 New York state election was held on November 2. Temporary President of the State Senate Joe R. Hanley (Rep.) was elected Lieutenant Governor; and Thomas D. Thacher (Rep.) was elected unopposed to succeed himself as Judge of the New York Court of Appeals. Two vacancies in the State Senate and seven vacancies in the Assembly were filled.

== Sessions ==
The legislature met for the first regular session (the 166th) at the State Capitol in Albany on January 6, 1943; and adjourned on March 26.

Oswald D. Heck (Rep.) was re-elected Speaker.

Joe R. Hanley (Rep.) was re-elected temporary president of the state Senate.

The legislature finally re-apportioned the Senate and Assembly districts. Re-apportionment was overdue since the figures of the 1925 state census had been published, but the Assembly, the Senate and the governor had been at odds over the question ever since. Now, for the first time since then, both houses of the legislature had majorities of the same party of which the governor was a member, all Republican. The Re-Apportionment Bill was introduced in the Legislature on March 8; and signed by Gov. Dewey on April 8. The re-apportionment was contested in the courts by the Democrats, but was upheld unanimously by the New York Court of Appeals on November 18, 1943.

The total number of state senators was increased to 56. Chautauqua, Dutchess, Monroe, Oneida, Rensselaer, St. Lawrence, Schenectady and Steuben counties lost one Assembly seat each; and New York County lost seven seats. Kings and Westchester counties gained one seat each; Nassau County gained two; Bronx County gained five; and Queens County gained six seats.

The legislature met for the second regular session (the 167th) at the State Capitol in Albany on January 5, 1944; and adjourned on March 18.

Benjamin F. Feinberg (Rep.) was elected Temporary President of the state Senate.

The legislature met for a special session at the State Capitol in Albany on October 30, 1944. This session was held to enact an extension of the voting time on the next election day, and to increase the pay for election workers.

== State Senate ==
=== Districts ===
- 1st District: Nassau and Suffolk counties
- 2nd and 3rd District: Parts of Queens County, i.e. the Borough of Queens
- 4th, 5th, 6th, 7th, 8th, 9th, 10th and 11th District: Parts of Kings County, i.e. the Borough of Brooklyn
- 12th, 13th, 14th, 15th, 16th, 17th, 18th, 19th and 20th District: Parts of New York County, i.e. the Borough of Manhattan
- 21st, 22nd and 23rd District: Parts of Bronx County, i.e. the Borough of the Bronx
- 24th District: Richmond County, i.e. the Borough of Richmond (now the Borough of Staten Island), and Rockland County
- 25th District: Part of Westchester County
- 26th District: Cortlandt, Greenburgh, Mount Pleasant, Ossining and part of Yonkers; in Westchester County
- 27th District: Orange and Sullivan counties
- 28th District: Columbia, Dutchess and Putnam counties
- 29th District: Delaware, Greene and Ulster counties
- 30th District: Albany County
- 31st District: Rensselaer County
- 32nd District: Saratoga and Schenectady counties
- 33rd District: Clinton, Essex, Warren and Washington counties
- 34th District: Franklin and St. Lawrence counties
- 35th District: Fulton, Hamilton, Herkimer and Lewis counties
- 36th District: Oneida County
- 37th District: Jefferson and Oswego counties
- 38th District: Onondaga County
- 39th District: Madison, Montgomery, Otsego and Schoharie counties
- 40th District: Broome, Chenango and Cortland counties
- 41st District: Chemung, Schuyler, Tioga and Tompkins counties
- 42nd District: Cayuga, Seneca and Wayne counties
- 43rd District: Ontario, Steuben and Yates counties
- 44th District: Allegany, Genesee, Livingston and Wyoming
- 45th and 46th District: Monroe County
- 47th District: Niagara and Orleans counties
- 48th, 49th and 50th District: Erie County
- 51st District: Cattaraugus and Chautauqua counties

=== Members ===
The asterisk (*) denotes members of the previous Legislature who continued in office as members of this Legislature. Floyd E. Anderson changed from the Assembly to the Senate at the beginning of this Legislature. Assemblymen John V. Downey and James A. Corcoran were elected to fill vacancies in the Senate.

Note: For brevity, the chairmanships omit the words "...the Committee on (the)..."

District	Senator	Party	Notes
1st	Perry B. Duryea Sr.*	Republican	
2nd	Seymour Halpern*	Rep./Am. Labor	
3rd	Peter T. Farrell*	Dem./Am. Labor	resigned on August 11, 1943, to run for the Queens Co. Court
3rd	John V. Downey*	Democrat	on November 2, 1943, elected to fill vacancy
4th	Carmine J. Marasco*	Democrat	on November 7, 1944, elected to the Kings County Court
5th	William Kirnan*	Democrat	
6th	Edward J. Coughlin*	Democrat	
7th	Louis B. Heller	Dem./Am. Labor	
8th	Samuel L. Greenberg	Democrat	
9th	Daniel Gutman*	Dem./Am. Labor	resigned on August 6, 1943, to run for the Municipal Court
9th	James A. Corcoran*	Democrat	on November 2, 1943, elected to fill vacancy
10th	Jeremiah F. Twomey*	Democrat	
11th	James J. Crawford*	Democrat	
12th	Elmer F. Quinn*	Democrat	
13th	Francis J. Mahoney	Democrat	
14th	William J. Murray*	Dem./Am. Labor	
15th	Lester Baum	Rep./Am. Labor	
16th	James G. Donovan	Democrat	
17th	Frederic R. Coudert Jr.*	Republican	
18th	Richard A. DiCostanzo	Rep./Am. Labor	
19th	Charles D. Perry*	Democrat	
20th	Alexander A. Falk*	Dem./Am. Labor	
21st	Lazarus Joseph*	Democrat	
22nd	Carl Pack*	Democrat	
23rd	John J. Dunnigan*	Democrat	Minority Leader
24th	Robert S. Bainbridge	Republican	
25th	Pliny W. Williamson*	Republican	
26th	William F. Condon*	Republican	
27th	Thomas C. Desmond*	Rep./Am. Labor	
28th	Frederic H. Bontecou	Republican	
29th	Arthur H. Wicks*	Republican	Chairman of Finance
30th	Julian B. Erway*	Democrat	
31st	Clifford C. Hastings*	Rep./Am. Labor	on June 3, 1944, appointed as Treasurer of Rensselaer Co.
32nd	Gilbert T. Seelye*	Republican	
33rd	Benjamin F. Feinberg*	Republican	on January 5, 1944, elected Temporary President
34th	Rhoda Fox Graves*	Rep./Am. Labor	
35th	Fred A. Young*	Rep./Dem.	
36th	William H. Hampton*	Rep./Am. Labor	
37th	Isaac B. Mitchell*	Republican	
38th	G. Frank Wallace*	Republican	
39th	Walter W. Stokes*	Republican	Chairman of Conservation
40th	Floyd E. Anderson*	Republican	
41st	Chauncey B. Hammond*	Republican	
42nd	Henry W. Griffith*	Republican	
43rd	Earle S. Warner*	Republican	
44th	Joe R. Hanley*	Rep./Dem.	on January 6, 1943, re-elected Temporary President; on November 2, 1943, elected Lieutenant Governor
44th	Austin W. Erwin	Republican	on February 15, 1944, elected to fill vacancy
45th	Rodney B. Janes*	Republican	
46th	Allen J. Oliver	Republican	
47th	William Bewley*	Republican	
48th	Walter J. Mahoney*	Rep./Am. Labor	
49th	Stephen J. Wojtkowiak*	Dem./Am. Labor	
50th	Charles O. Burney Jr.*	Republican	
51st	George H. Pierce	Rep./Dem.	

=== Employees ===
- Clerk: William S. King
- Assistant Clerk: Fred J. Slater, died on August 20, 1943

== State Assembly ==
=== Assemblymen ===
Note: For brevity, the chairmanships omit the words "...the Committee on (the)..."

District		Assemblymen	Party	Notes
Albany	1st	George W. Foy*	Democrat	
Albany	2nd	Mortimer A. Cullen*	Democrat	
Albany	3rd	John McBain*	Republican	
Allegany		William H. MacKenzie*	Republican	
Bronx	1st	Matthew J. H. McLaughlin*	Democrat	
Bronx	2nd	Patrick J. Fogarty*	Democrat	
Bronx	3rd	Arthur Wachtel*	Democrat	
Bronx	4th	Isidore Dollinger*	Democrat	
Bronx	5th	Julius J. Gans*	Democrat	
Bronx	6th	Peter A. Quinn*	Democrat	on November 7, 1944, elected to the 79th U.S. Congress
Bronx	7th	Louis Bennett*	Democrat	
Bronx	8th	John A. Devany Jr.*	Democrat	
Broome	1st	Richard H. Knauf	Republican	
Broome	2nd	Orlo M. Brees*	Republican	
Cattaraugus		Leo P. Noonan*	Republican	
Cayuga		James H. Chase*	Republican	
Chautauqua	1st	E. Herman Magnuson*	Republican	
Chautauqua	2nd	Herman B. Graf	Republican	
Chemung		Harry J. Tifft*	Republican	
Chenango		Irving M. Ives*	Republican	Majority Leader
Clinton		Leslie G. Ryan*	Rep./Am. Labor	
Columbia		Frederick A. Washburn*	Republican	
Cortland		Harold L. Creal*	Republican	
Delaware		Elmer J. Kellam	Republican	
Dutchess	1st	Howard N. Allen*	Rep./Dem.	
Dutchess	2nd	Ernest I. Hatfield	Republican	
Erie	1st	Frank A. Gugino*	Republican	
Erie	2nd	Harold B. Ehrlich*	Rep./Am. Labor	
Erie	3rd	William J. Butler	Republican	
Erie	4th	John P. Quinn	Dem./Am. Labor	
Erie	5th	Philip V. Baczkowski*	Dem./Am. Labor	
Erie	6th	Jerome C. Kreinheder*	Republican	
Erie	7th	Justin C. Morgan*	Republican	
Erie	8th	John R. Pillion*	Republican	
Essex		Sheldon F. Wickes*	Republican	
Franklin		William L. Doige*	Republican	
Fulton and Hamilton		Joseph R. Younglove*	Republican	
Genesee		Herbert A. Rapp*	Republican	
Greene		William E. Brady*	Rep./Am. Labor	
Herkimer		Leo A. Lawrence*	Rep./Am. Labor	
Jefferson		Russell Wright*	Republican	
Kings	1st	Lewis W. Olliffe*	Rep./Am. Labor	
Kings	2nd	Leo F. Rayfiel*	Democrat	on November 7, 1944, elected to the 79th U.S. Congress
Kings	3rd	Mary A. Gillen*	Democrat	
Kings	4th	Bernard Austin*	Dem./Am. Labor	
Kings	5th	John R. Starkey*	Dem./Am. Labor	
Kings	6th	Robert J. Crews*	Rep./Am. Labor	
Kings	7th	John F. Furey*	Dem./Am. Labor	
Kings	8th	Charles J. Beckinella*	Democrat	
Kings	9th	Edgar F. Moran*	Democrat	
Kings	10th	Walter E. Cooke	Democrat	
Kings	11th	Eugene F. Bannigan*	Democrat	
Kings	12th	James W. Feely*	Democrat	
Kings	13th	Ralph Schwartz*	Dem./Am. Labor	
Kings	14th	Harry Gittleson*	Democrat	
Kings	15th	John Smolenski*	Democrat	
Kings	16th	Louis L. Friedman*	Democrat	
Kings	17th	Fred G. Moritt*	Dem./Am. Labor	
Kings	18th	Irwin Steingut*	Dem./Am. Labor	Minority Leader
Kings	19th	Max M. Turshen*	Democrat	
Kings	20th	Roy H. Rudd*	Democrat	
Kings	21st	Thomas A. Dwyer*	Democrat	
Kings	22nd	James A. Corcoran*	Democrat	resigned on August 6, 1943, to run for the State Senate
Kings	22nd	Anthony J. Travia	Democrat	on November 2, 1943, elected to fill vacancy
Kings	23rd	Alfred A. Lama	Democrat	
Lewis		Benjamin H. Demo*	Republican	
Livingston		Joseph W. Ward*	Republican	
Madison		Wheeler Milmoe*	Republican	Chairman of Public Education
Monroe	1st	Frank J. Sellmayer Jr.*	Republican	
Monroe	2nd	Abraham Schulman*	Republican	
Monroe	3rd	George T. Manning*	Republican	
Monroe	4th	Thomas F. Riley	Republican	
Monroe	5th	William B. Mann*	Republican	
Montgomery		John F. Bennison*	Republican	
Nassau	1st	John D. Bennett*	Republican	
Nassau	2nd	William S. Hults Jr.	Republican	
New York	1st	John J. Lamula	Republican	
New York	2nd	Louis DeSalvio*	Democrat	
New York	3rd	Maurice E. Downing*	Democrat	
New York	4th	Leonard Farbstein*	Democrat	
New York	5th	Owen McGivern*	Democrat	
New York	6th	Sidney Moses	Democrat	
New York	7th	Irwin D. Davidson*	Democrat	
New York	8th	Stephen J. Jarema*	Democrat	
New York	9th	Ira H. Holley*	Democrat	
New York	10th	MacNeil Mitchell*	Republican	
New York	11th	Patrick H. Sullivan*	Democrat	
New York	12th	Francis X. McGowan	Democrat	
New York	13th	James T. McNamara*	Democrat	
New York	14th	Warren J. McCarron*	Democrat	
New York	15th	Abbot Low Moffat*	Republican	Chairman of Ways and Means; resigned on August 16, 1943, to accept a post in the U.S. Department of State
New York	15th	John R. Brook	Republican	on November 2, 1943, elected to fill vacancy
New York	16th	John P. Morrissey*	Democrat	
New York	17th	Hulan E. Jack*	Democrat	
New York	18th	Hamlet O. Catenaccio*	Republican	
New York	19th	Daniel L. Burrows*	Democrat	
New York	20th	Frank G. Rossetti	Democrat	
New York	21st	William T. Andrews*	Democrat	
New York	22nd	Daniel Flynn*	Democrat	
New York	23rd	William J. A. Glancy*	Democrat	
Niagara	1st	Jacob E. Hollinger*	Republican	
Niagara	2nd	Harry D. Suitor*	Republican	
Oneida	1st	Frank A. Emma*	Democrat	
Oneida	2nd	William R. Williams*	Republican	on November 2, 1943, elected Sheriff of Oneida Co.
Oneida	2nd	Harry G. Converse	Republican	on November 2, 1943, elected to fill vacancy
Oneida	3rd	C. Dean Williams*	Republican	
Onondaga	1st	Leo W. Breed*	Republican	
Onondaga	2nd	George B. Parsons*	Republican	
Onondaga	3rd	Frank J. Costello*	Republican	
Ontario		Harry R. Marble*	Republican	
Orange	1st	Lee B. Mailler*	Republican	
Orange	2nd	Wilson C. Van Duzer	Republican	
Orleans		John S. Thompson*	Republican	
Oswego		Hadwen C. Fuller	Republican	resigned on September 21, 1943, to run for the 78th U.S. Congress
Oswego		Henry D. Coville	Republican	on November 2, 1943, elected to fill vacancy
Otsego		Chester T. Backus*	Republican	
Putnam		D. Mallory Stephens*	Republican	from August 18, 1943, Chairman of Ways and Means
Queens	1st	Charles J. Dalzell*	Democrat	
Queens	2nd	vacant	George F. Torsney (Dem.) was re-elected, but died on December 28, 1942	
Queens	2nd	William E. Clancy	Democrat	on March 2, 1943, elected to fill vacancy
Queens	3rd	John V. Downey*	Democrat	resigned on August 19, 1943, to run for the State Senate
Queens	3rd	Maurice Adda	Democrat	on November 2, 1943, elected to fill vacancy
Queens	4th	William F. Bowe	Democrat	
Queens	5th	John H. Ferril*	Democrat	
Queens	6th	George Archinal*	Republican	
Rensselaer	1st	J. Eugene Zimmer*	Am. Labor/Rep.	
Rensselaer	2nd	Maurice Whitney*	Republican	resigned on April 22, 1943, and joined the armed forces
Rensselaer	2nd	John S. Finch	Rep./Am. Labor	on November 2, 1943, elected to fill vacancy
Richmond	1st	Charles Bormann*	Democrat	
Richmond	2nd	S. Robert Molinari	Republican	
Rockland		Robert Walmsley	Republican	
St. Lawrence	1st	Grant F. Daniels*	Republican	
St. Lawrence	2nd	Allan P. Sill*	Republican	
Saratoga		Richard J. Sherman*	Republican	
Schenectady	1st	Oswald D. Heck*	Republican	re-elected Speaker
Schenectady	2nd	Harold Armstrong*	Republican	resigned on August 21, 1943, to run for Sheriff of Schenectady Co.
Schenectady	2nd	Wendell C. Wilber	Republican	on November 2, 1943, elected to fill vacancy
Schoharie		Arthur L. Parsons*	Republican	
Schuyler		Edward K. Corwin	Republican	
Seneca		Lawrence W. Van Cleef*	Republican	
Steuben	1st	Edith C. Cheney*	Republican	
Steuben	2nd	William M. Stuart*	Republican	
Suffolk	1st	Edmund R. Lupton*	Republican	
Suffolk	2nd	Elisha T. Barrett*	Republican	
Sullivan		Ronald M. Albee	Republican	
Tioga		Myron D. Albro*	Republican	
Tompkins		Stanley C. Shaw*	Republican	
Ulster		John F. Wadlin*	Republican	
Warren		Harry A. Reoux*	Republican	Chairman of Judiciary
Washington		Henry Neddo*	Republican	
Wayne		Henry V. Wilson*	Republican	
Westchester	1st	Christopher H. Lawrence*	Republican	
Westchester	2nd	Theodore Hill Jr.*	Republican	
Westchester	3rd	James E. Owens*	Republican	
Westchester	4th	Jane H. Todd*	Republican	
Westchester	5th	Malcolm Wilson*	Republican	served in the U.S. Navy but did not resign his seat
Wyoming		Harold C. Ostertag*	Republican	
Yates		Fred S. Hollowell*	Republican	

=== Employees ===
- Clerk: Ansley B. Borkowski

== Sources ==
- You and the Legislature in The State Employee (January 1943, Vol. 12, No. 1, pg. 24, 25 and 34)
- Members of the New York Senate (1940s) at Political Graveyard
- Members of the New York Assembly (1940s) at Political Graveyard
- LEGISLATIVE MIRROR, weekly newsletter by Assemblyman Wheeler Milmoe, in the Madison County Leader, of Morrisville, on January 20, 1944
