= Charles J. Hewitt =

American businessman, banker and politician (1867–1940)

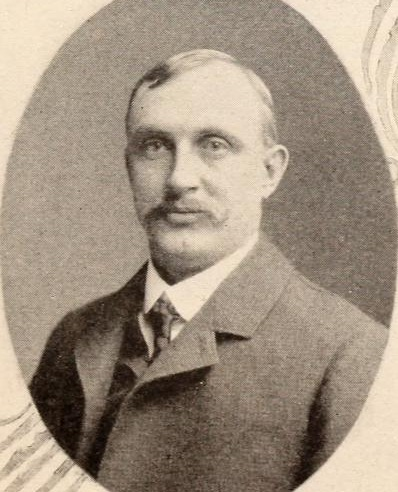
Charles J. Hewitt (1902)

Charles J. Hewitt (July 15, 1867 – July 22, 1940) was an American businessman, banker and politician from New York. He was the first politician to complete 30 years sitting in the New York State Senate.

== Life ==
He was born on July 15, 1867, in Navarino, Onondaga County, New York, the son of Jefferson Smith Hewitt (1839–1894) and Melinda (Johnson) Hewitt (1845–1922). The family removed to a farm in Locke in 1870. He attended the graded school in Locke, and Moravia High School. He married Adina Hart (born 1869). He engaged in the produce business; and later also in the cold storage business. He was President of the Locke Citizens' Bank.

Hewitt was Supervisor of the Town of Locke in 1899 and 1900; and a member of the New York State Assembly (Cayuga Co., 2nd D.) in 1902, 1903 and 1904.

On October 5, 1908, he was nominated as a compromise candidate for the State Senate after a week of deadlock and the retirement of both previous candidates. Hewitt was a member of the New York State Senate from 1909 to 1938, sitting in the 132nd, 133rd, 134th, 135th, 136th, 137th, 138th, 139th, 140th, 141st, 142nd, 143rd, 144th, 145th, 146th, 147th, 148th, 149th, 150th, 151st, 152nd, 153rd, 154th, 155th, 156th, 157th, 158th, 159th, 160th and 161st New York State Legislatures; and was for many years Chairman of the Senate Committee on Finance.

He died suddenly on June 22, 1940, at his home in Locke, Cayuga County, New York; and was buried at the Indian Mound Cemetery in Moravia.

== Sources ==
New York State Assembly
Preceded by George S. Fordyce	New York State Assembly; Cayuga County, 2nd District; 1902–1904	Succeeded by J. Guernsey Allen
New York State Senate
Preceded by Owen Cassidy	New York State Senate; 40th District; 1909–1918	Succeeded by Clayton R. Lusk
Preceded by William A. Carson	New York State Senate; 42nd District; 1919–1938	Succeeded by Henry W. Griffith
