= Floyd E. Anderson =

American lawyer and politician (1891–1976)

Member of the New York Senate from the 45th district
- In office 1945–1951
- Preceded by: Rodney B. Janes
- Succeeded by: Orlo M. Brees

Member of the New York Senate from the 40th district
- In office 1943–1944
- Preceded by: Roy M. Page
- Succeeded by: Fred A. Young

Member of the New York State Assembly from the Broome County, 1st district
- In office 1941–1942
- Preceded by: Edward F. Vincent
- Succeeded by: Richard H. Knauf

Personal details
- Born: Floyd Eugene Anderson; January 24, 1891 Bainbridge, New York, U.S.
- Died: February 17, 1976 (aged 85) Binghamton, New York, U.S.
- Party: Republican
- Spouse: Edna Madeline Mattice (m. 1914)
- Children: Warren M.
- Education: Amherst College; Syracuse University College of Law (LLB)
- Occupation: Politician; lawyer; judge

Floyd Eugene Anderson (January 24, 1891 – February 17, 1976) was an American lawyer, judge and politician from New York.

== Life ==
He was born on January 24, 1891, in Bainbridge, Chenango County, New York, the son of Jesse L. Anderson and Abbie (Holcomb) Anderson. He graduated from Bainbridge High School; from Amherst College; and LL.B. from Syracuse University College of Law in 1914. He was admitted to the bar the same year, practiced law in Binghamton, and was an Assistant District Attorney of Broome County from 1919 to 1921. On November 26, 1914, he married Edna Madeline Mattice (born 1889), and their son was State Senator Warren M. Anderson (1915–2007).

Floyd Anderson was a member of the New York State Assembly (Broome Co., 1st D.) in 1941 and 1942. He was a member of the New York State Senate from 1943 to 1952, sitting in the 164th, 165th, 166th, 167th and 168th New York State Legislatures. He was appointed to the New York Supreme Court (6th D.), to fill a vacancy, on January 3; and resigned his seat on January 5, 1952. In November 1952, he was elected to succeed himself.

He died on February 17, 1976, at a nursing home in Binghamton, New York.

The Floyd E. Anderson Center for the Performing Arts at Binghamton University was named in his honor.

== Sources ==
New York State Assembly
Preceded by Edward F. Vincent	New York State Assembly; Broome County, 1st District; 1941–1942	Succeeded by Richard H. Knauf
New York State Senate
Preceded by Roy M. Page	New York State Senate; 40th District; 1943–1944	Succeeded by Fred A. Young
Preceded by Rodney B. Janes	New York State Senate; 45th District; 1945–1951	Succeeded by Orlo M. Brees
