= Michael J. Kernan =

American politician (1884–1953)

Michael Jenkins Kernan (March 13, 1884 – December 15, 1953) was an American politician from New York.

== Life ==
He was born on March 13, 1884, in Utica, New York, the son of Nicholas Edward Kernan (1845–1902) and Harriet Anne (Jenkins) Kernan (1846–1923). He was an investment broker.

Kernan was a member of the New York State Assembly (Oneida Co., 1st D.) in 1923. On September 25, 1925, he married Katharine Covenhoven Clarke (1886–1969), and they had three children, among them journalist Michael Kernan (1927–2005).

He was a member of the New York State Senate (36th D.) in 1933 and 1934; and was Chairman of the Committee on Affairs of Villages.

He died on December 15, 1953, at his home in Manhattan Beach, California.

U.S. Senator Francis Kernan (1816–1892) was his grandfather.

== Sources ==
New York State Senate
Preceded by Hartwell W. Booth	New York State Senate; Oneida County, 1st District; 1923	Succeeded by John C. Devereux
New York State Senate
Preceded by Charles B. Horton	New York State Senate; 36th District; 1933–1934	Succeeded by William H. Hampton
