= Frederick Sheide =

American politician (1876–1944)

Frederick Sheide (June 1, 1876 – March 12, 1944) was an American politician from Lindenhurst, New York.

== Life ==
Sheide was born on June 1, 1876, in Brooklyn, New York, the son of Peter Scheide and Mary Wernsdorfer. He attended parochial schools in Brooklyn and St. John's College.

Sheide moved to Lindenhurst in 1900 and began manufacturing carbonated beverages there. In 1907, he was elected Town Clerk of Babylon. He was re-elected to the office unopposed in 1909. In 1908, he was the Democratic candidate for the New York State Assembly in the Suffolk County 2nd District. He lost the election to Republican George L. Thompson by 301 votes. In 1910, he was elected Chairman of the Suffolk County Democratic County Committee. In that year, he again ran for the Assembly against Thompson and was able to win by 800 votes, making him the first Democrat elected to the Assembly from that district. He served in the Assembly in 1911.

Sheide lost the 1911 re-election to Thompson. He was a delegate to the 1912 Democratic National Convention. He was elected Town Supervisor of Babylon in 1913 and served in that position until 1917. He was the Democratic leader of Babylon when he died. He worked in his bottling beverage business until 1924, when he entered the hotel business and ran the Plaza Hotel. In 1917, he was appointed Deputy Collector of Internal Revenue. In 1931, during the Prohibition, he was arrested while delivering 10 half barrels of beer. The Plaza was also raided and 102 barrels of beer were found, which led Judge Mortimer W. Byers to issue a padlock injunction against the grill room a few months later.

Sheide was a member of Our Lady of Perpetual Help Church, and in 1903 he founded a Knights of Columbus chapter with the same name. He was also a member and foreman of the Liberty Hose Company and chief of the Lindenhurst Fire Department. In 1896, he married Agnes Wessel. She died in 1933. Their daughter was Lindenhurst Postmaster Arthur Cosgrove.

Sheide died from a cerebral hemorrhage at the Nassau-Suffolk Hospital in Copiague on March 12, 1944. He was buried in the Lindenhurst Catholic Cemetery.

New York State Assembly
Preceded by George L. Thompson	New York State Assembly; Suffolk County, 2nd District; 1911	Succeeded by George L. Thompson
