= Edwin C. Nutt =

American farmer and politician (1868–1933)

Edwin Cheney Nutt (January 12, 1868 – May 24, 1933) was an American farmer and politician from Yates County, New York.

== Life ==
Nutt was born on January 12, 1868, in Torrey, New York, the son of Edwin H. Nutt.

Nutt attended rural schools, the Starkey Seminary, and Penn Yan Academy. He worked as a farmer since boyhood and was active in the Grange, serving as Master of the Benton Grange and the Yates County Pomona Grange. He was also secretary-treasurer and president of the Torrey Telephone Company, president of the Yates County Agricultural Society, a director of the Yates County Farm Bureau, and a member of the Torrey Town Board.

In 1925, Nutt was elected to the New York State Assembly as a Republican, representing Yates County. He served in the Assembly in 1926, 1927, 1928, 1929, 1930, and 1931. He left the Assembly the latter year and was succeeded by Fred S. Hollowell.

Nutt was a member of the Odd Fellows and the Dresden Methodist Episcopal Church. He was married. His daughter was Mrs. John A. Hatch of Penn Yan.

Nutt died at the Soldiers and Sailors Hospital Memorial Hospital from a long illness on May 24, 1933. His funeral was held at his home in Torrey, with Rev. Boyd A. Little of Clifton Springs officiating and Rev. E. B. Brewster of the Dresden Methodist Episcopal Church officiating. He was buried in Lake View Cemetery.

New York State Assembly
Preceded by James H. Underwood	New York State Assembly; Yates County; 1926–1931	Succeeded by Fred S. Hollowell
