= Fred A. Young =

American politician (1904–1973)

Member of the New York Senate from the 35th district
- In office January 1, 1939 – December 31, 1944
- Preceded by: Harry F. Dunkel
- Succeeded by: Mortimer A. Cullen

Member of the New York Senate from the 40th district
- In office January 1, 1945 – December 31, 1949
- Preceded by: Floyd E. Anderson
- Succeeded by: Walter Van Wiggeren

Member of the New York House of Representatives from the Lewis County district
- In office January 1, 1936 – December 31, 1938
- Preceded by: Edward M. Sheldon
- Succeeded by: Benjamin H. Demo

Chairman of the New York State Republican Committee
- In office April 1963 – January 1965
- Preceded by: L. Judson Morhouse
- Succeeded by: Carl Spad

Personal details
- Born: August 27, 1904 Whitehall, New York, U.S.
- Died: October 16, 1973 (aged 69) Albany, New York, U.S.
- Resting place: Lowville Rural Cemetery
- Party: Republican

Fred Anthony Young (August 27, 1904 – October 16, 1973) was an American lawyer and politician from New York.

== Life ==
He was born on August 27, 1904, in Whitehall, Washington County, New York, the son of Dominick Young (1872–1958) and Isabel (Izzo) Young (1882–1947). He graduated B.S. from St. Lawrence University, and LL.B. from Albany Law School. On June 6, 1929, he married Marjorie Farrington (1907–1988), of Lowville, and they had two children. In 1931, he began to practice law in his wife's hometown.

Young was a member of the New York State Assembly (Lewis Co.) in 1936, 1937 and 1938.

He was a member of the New York State Senate from 1939 to 1949, sitting in the 162nd, 163rd, 164th, 165th and 166th New York State Legislatures. He was a delegate to the 1944 and 1948 Republican National Conventions. He was re-elected to the 167th New York State Legislature, but on the opening day of the legislative session, January 5, 1949, he resigned his seat and took office as a justice of the New York Court of Claims. He was appointed as Presiding Justice of the Court of Claims in 1962, and retired from the bench in 1972.

He was Chairman of the New York State Republican Committee and a member of the Republican National Committee from 1963 to 1965; and a delegate to the 1964 Republican National Convention.

He died on October 15, 1973, in Albany Medical Center in Albany, New York, of cancer; and was buried at the Lowville Rural Cemetery.

== Sources ==
New York State Assembly
Preceded by Edward M. Sheldon	New York State Assembly; Lewis County; 1936–1938	Succeeded by Benjamin H. Demo
New York State Senate
Preceded by Harry F. Dunkel	New York State Senate; 35th District; 1939–1944	Succeeded by Mortimer A. Cullen
Preceded by Floyd E. Anderson	New York State Senate; 40th District; 1945–1949	Succeeded by Walter Van Wiggeren
Party political offices
Preceded by L. Judson Morhouse	Chairman of the New York State Republican Committee; 1963–1965	Succeeded by Carl Spad
