= Edith C. Cheney =

American politician

Edith C. Cheney (July 12, 1888 – January 1955) was an American politician from New York.

== Life ==
She was born Edith Madison Costello on July 12, 1888, in Elmira, Chemung County, New York, the daughter of William Edward Costello and Virginia (Earle) Costello.

On February 22, 1911, she married Guy W. Cheney (1886–1939), and they had four sons. Her husband was District Attorney of Steuben County from 1921 to 1931; and a member of the New York State Assembly (Steuben Co., 1st D.) from 1937 until his death, after an appendectomy, on April 18, 1939.

On April 29, 1939, Edith Cheney announced her candidature to succeed her husband in the Assembly. In November 1939, Edith Cheney was elected to the State Assembly, to fill the vacancy caused by the death of her husband, and took her seat in the 162nd New York State Legislature at the beginning of the session in January 1940. She was re-elected twice and remained in the Assembly until 1944, sitting in the 163rd and 164th New York State Legislatures. She was President of the New York State Federation of Women's Clubs from 1940 to 1942.

In 1943, the assembly seats were re-apportioned, and Steuben County lost its second seat. William M. Stuart—who at that time represented the 2nd district—was re-elected in the whole county in November 1944. In December 1944, Edith Cheney was appointed to the Nutrition Board of the State Education Department.

She died on August 31, 1953; and was buried at the Hope Cemetery in Corning.

== Sources ==
New York State Assembly
Preceded by Guy W. Cheney	New York State Assembly; Steuben County, 1st District; 1940–1944	Succeeded by William M. Stuart all of Steuben County
