= Edgar A. Sharp =

American politician (1876–1948)

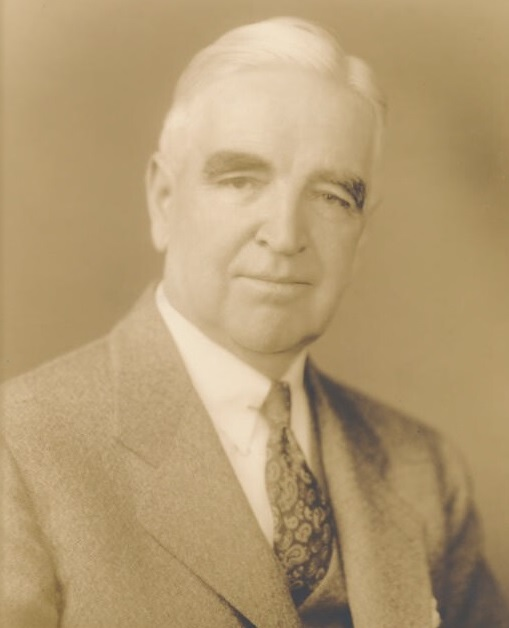

Member of the U.S. House of Representatives from New York's 1st district
- In office January 3, 1945 – January 3, 1947
- Preceded by: Leonard W. Hall
- Succeeded by: W. Kingsland Macy

Supervisor of the Town of Brookhaven
- In office January 1, 1935 – January 1, 1943
- Preceded by: Claude C. Neville
- Succeeded by: Philipp A. Hattemer

Personal details
- Born: June 3, 1876 Patchogue, New York, US
- Died: November 27, 1948 (aged 72) Patchogue, New York, US
- Resting place: Holy Sepulchre Cemetery (Coram, New York)
- Party: Republican

Edgar Allan Sharp (June 3, 1876 – November 27, 1948) was a United States representative from New York. Born in Patchogue, Suffolk County, he attended the public and high schools, engaged as a clerk in the post office at Patchogue from 1898 to 1906, and served as assistant postmaster from 1906 to 1918. He was in charge of construction work for the Knights of Columbus in France and England from April 1918 to January 1920 and engaged in the real estate and insurance business in Patchogue and as a real estate appraiser for Suffolk County from 1920 to 1944. He was an auctioneer from 1929 to 1944 and was also interested in banking.

From 1930 to 1933, he was a member of the zoning and planning board of the Town of Brookhaven and was supervisor of Brookhaven from 1935 to 1943. Sharp was elected as a Republican to the Seventy-ninth Congress, holding office from January 3, 1945, to January 3, 1947. He was not a candidate for renomination in 1946 and resumed his former business pursuits; in 1948, he died in Patchogue. Interment was in Saint Frances Cemetery, Patchogue, New York.

U.S. House of Representatives
Preceded by Leonard W. Hall	Member of the U.S. House of Representatives from New York's 1st congressional district 1945–1947	Succeeded by W. Kingsland Macy
