= W. Kingsland Macy =

American politician (1889–1961)

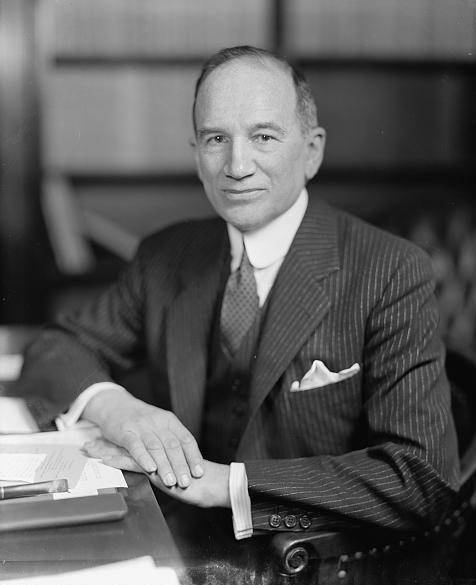

Member of the U.S. House of Representatives from New York's 1st district
- In office January 3, 1947 – January 3, 1951
- Preceded by: Edgar A. Sharp
- Succeeded by: Ernest Greenwood

Chairman of the Suffolk County Republican Committee
- In office 1926–1951

Member of the New York Senate from the 1st district
- In office November 6, 1945 – November 5, 1946
- Preceded by: Perry B. Duryea Sr.
- Succeeded by: S. Wentworth Horton

Chairman of the New York State Republican Committee
- In office 1930–1934
- Preceded by: William J. Maier
- Succeeded by: Melvin C. Eaton

Personal details
- Born: November 21, 1889 New York City
- Died: July 15, 1961 (aged 71) Islip, New York
- Resting place: Oakwood Cemetery (Bay Shore, New York)
- Party: Republican

William Kingsland "King" Macy (November 21, 1889 – July 15, 1961) was an American politician from New York.

== Background ==
He was born on November 21, 1889, in New York City. He graduated from Groton School (in Groton, Massachusetts) in 1908, and from Harvard University in 1912.

== Career ==
He engaged in wholesaling and importing from 1912 to 1915, served with the United States Food Administration and War Trade Board from 1917 to 1919, was president of the Union Pacific Tea Co. from 1919 to 1922, was a member of a stock brokerage firm from 1922 to 1938, and was a banker and publisher.

He was Chairman of the Suffolk County Republican Committee from 1926 to 1951; Chairman of the New York State Republican Committee from 1930 to 1934; a delegate to the 1928, 1932, 1940, 1944 and 1948 Republican National Conventions and a delegate to all Republican State Conventions from 1928 to 1946.

He was active in the investigation of the New York State Banking Department in 1929; and also in promoting the Seabury inquiry into the affairs of New York City in 1931 and 1932. He was a Regent of the University of the State of New York from 1941 to 1953, and a member of the New York State Senate (1st D.) in 1946. Macy's hold over the Suffolk Republican party organization was so complete that he was called "The Little King of Suffolk County".

Macy was elected as a Republican to the 80th and 81st United States Congresses, holding office from January 3, 1947, to January 3, 1951. In 1947–8, he served on the Herter Committee. His political empire crumbled when he disseminated papers accusing Gov. Thomas E. Dewey of heading off a potential opponent with money and a public job. He was defeated for re-election in 1950, the only incumbent Republican representative to lose to a Democrat (who was a previous Republican candidate). And then the Suffolk County Republican Committee removed him from the chair. Afterwards he was Chairman of the Board of the Suffolk Consolidated Press Company and of the Suffolk Broadcasting Corporation.

== Death ==
He died on July 15, 1961, in Islip in 1961, and his remains were placed in a receiving vault at Oakwood Cemetery.

Party political offices
Preceded by William J. Maier	Chairman of the New York Republican State Committee; 1930–1934	Succeeded by Melvin C. Eaton
New York State Senate
Preceded by Perry B. Duryea Sr.	Member of the New York State Senate from the 1st district November 6, 1945 - November 5, 1946	Succeeded by S. Wentworth Horton
U.S. House of Representatives
Preceded by Edgar A. Sharp	Member of the U.S. House of Representatives from New York's 1st congressional district 1947–1951	Succeeded by Ernest Greenwood
