= Michael Kernan =

American author and journalist (1927–2005)

- Born: Michael Jenkins Kernan Jr. April 29, 1927; Utica, New York, US
- Died: May 4, 2005 (aged 78); Bennington, Vermont, US
- Occupation: Journalist
- Years active: 1949–1994
- Employer: The Washington Post
- Parent: Michael J. Kernan (father)
- Relatives: Francis Kernan (great-grandfather)

Michael Jenkins Kernan Jr. (April 29, 1927 – May 4, 2005) was an American author and journalist.

== Background ==
Kernan was born on April 29, 1927, in Utica, New York, and grew up outside Clinton, Oneida County, New York. His father, Michael J. Kernan (1884–1953), was a stockbroker and member of the New York State Senate. His great-grandfather Francis Kernan (1816–1892) was a U.S. Senator. Kernan graduated from Harvard University in 1949.

== Career ==
Kernan worked for the Watertown Daily Times from 1949 until 1953. From 1953 to 1966, he was an editor and reporter for the Redwood City Tribune, a paper in California.

In 1967, Kernan began work at The Washington Post. In 1969, he became one of the founding journalists of the new Post's Style section. He would remain at the Post in the Style section for the rest of his primary career, writing articles on a wide variety of subjects, including about his speech impediment of stuttering. Kernan's final story as a staff writer was on June 18, 1989.

Benjamin C. Bradlee, executive editor of The Post, described Kernan as a "poet in newspaperman's clothing". Mary Hadar, former editor of the Post's Style section, said "He was a glorious writer who could make anything interesting". The Post published a special appreciation for Kernan. He died on May 4, 2000, aged 78, in Bennington, Vermont.

== Works ==
Kernan published a work of non-fiction The Violet Dots (1978) about a British soldier who fought in the Battle of the Somme, and the novels The Lost Diaries of Frans Hals (1994) and Before (2001), a prequel to Robert Louis Stevenson's Treasure Island.

He published more than 100 articles for the Smithsonian Magazine, including seven years writing the "Around the Mall and Beyond" column.

Some of his articles for the Washington Post include:

- "A Literary Skirmish Over Hiss" (review of Perjury by Allen Weinstein)
- "War Casualty" (review of Let There Be Light by John Huston, republished in 2012 from 1981)
- "Mortal Thoughts" (review of Enter Sandman by Stephanie Williams)
