= Perry B. Duryea (state senator) =

American politician

Perry B. Duryea Sr.

Commissioner of the New York State Department of Conservation
- In office April 11, 1945 – December 31, 1954
- Governor: Thomas E. Dewey
- Preceded by: John A. White
- Succeeded by: Louis A. Wehle

Member of the New York State Senate from the 1st district
- In office January 1, 1942 – April 11, 1945
- Preceded by: George L. Thompson
- Succeeded by: W. Kingsland Macy

Personal details
- Born: June 9, 1891 New York City
- Died: November 9, 1968 (aged 77) Amityville, New York
- Party: Republican

Perry Belmont Duryea (June 9, 1891 – November 9, 1968) was an American businessman and politician from New York.

== Life ==
He was born on June 9, 1891, in New York City, the son of Carll Smith Duryea (1859–1911) and Almyra J. Howell (1858–1913). He ran a seafood wholesale business in Montauk, New York. On January 2, 1920, he married Jane T. Stewart (1889–1978), and they had two children: Speaker of the New York State Assembly Perry B. Duryea, Jr. (1921–2004) and Jane Duryea.

Duryea was elected on November 4, 1941, to the New York State Senate (1st D.), to fill the vacancy caused by the death of George L. Thompson, and took his seat in the 163rd New York State Legislature in January 1942. He was re-elected in 1942 and 1944, and remained in the State Senate until 1945, sitting in the 164th and 165th New York State Legislatures. He resigned his seat on April 11, 1945, and was appointed by Governor Thomas E. Dewey as New York State Commissioner of Conservation. He remained in that office until the end of the Dewey administration in 1954; and was appointed by Dewey on December 31, 1954, as one of the employers' representatives to the New York State Advisory Council on Employment and Unemployment Insurance.

He was an alternate delegate to the 1952 Republican National Convention.

He died on November 9, 1968, in South Oaks Hospital in Amityville, New York.

== Sources ==
New York State Senate
Preceded by George L. Thompson	Member of the New York State Senate from the 1st district January 1, 1942 - April 11, 1945	Succeeded by W. Kingsland Macy
