= Rodney B. Janes =

American politician (1892–1973)

Rodney Berdett Janes (October 21, 1892 – May 26, 1973) was an American businessman and politician from New York.

== Life ==
He was born on October 21, 1892, in Rochester, New York. He attended Public School No. 4, and West High School. During World War I he served in the U.S. Navy. He ran a greeting card business in Rochester.

Janes was a member of the New York State Senate from 1939 to 1946, sitting in the 162nd, 163rd, 164th and 165th New York State Legislatures. He was an alternate delegate to the 1944 Republican National Convention.

He died on May 26, 1973; and was buried at the Mount Hope Cemetery in Rochester.

== Legacy ==
He left an estate, assessed at about $3,500,000 at the time of his death, partly to his widow Cynthia W. Janes (c.1901–1986), partly to charity trust funds. About 70% of the estate consisted of shares of Eastman Kodak evaluated in 1973 at $135 a share. When the executors finally sold the Eastman Kodak stock to set up the trust funds, the value had dropped below $50 a share, and the case went to court. The New York Attorney General, on behalf of the charities which would have received much more money, claimed that Janes's highly concentrated stock portfolio should have been sold and diversified as soon as possible. Eventually the case was decided by the New York Court of Appeals in 1997, ordering the executor (Lincoln First Bank of Rochester) to pay damages of more than $4,000,000.

The Rochester Area Community Foundation hands out the Rodney B. Janes Award for Private or Parochial High School and the Rodney B. Janes Business, Vocational or Technical Award.

== Sources ==
New York State Senate
Preceded by Emmett L. Doyle	New York State Senate; 45th District; 1939–1944	Succeeded by Floyd E. Anderson
Preceded by Charles O. Burney, Jr.	New York State Senate; 50th District; 1945–1946	Succeeded by George T. Manning
