= Bernard Haber =

American politician

Bernard Haber (1920 – February 26, 1959) was an American lawyer and politician from New York.

== Life ==
Haber was born in the Coney Island section of Brooklyn, New York, in 1920. He attended Thomas Jefferson High School, Brooklyn College and Brooklyn Law School. During World War II he served in the U.S. Air Force, rising to the rank of first lieutenant. He practiced law in New York City. He married Mildred Levine, and they had two daughters, Francine and Cheryl.

He was a member of the New York State Assembly (Kings Co., 16th D.) from 1956 until his death in 1959, sitting in the 170th, 171st and 172nd New York State Legislatures, and serving on the Canals and Waterways, Public Institutions, Villages, and Printing and Engrossed Bills Committees.

On February 23, 1959, Haber, State Senator Frank J. Pino, Assemblyman Joseph Kottler and Kottler's 14-year-old son Harry were driving in a snowstorm on the New York State Thruway, on the way to Albany, when their car collided near Tuxedo Park with another car and then crashed into a rock ledge. Pino broke a leg, and the Kottlers suffered only minor injuries. Haber suffered a skull fracture and brain injuries, was brought to Good Samaritan Hospital in Suffern, and died there three days later.

Haber Houses, an NYCHA senior citizen development in Coney Island, Brooklyn was named in his honor. He was Jewish.

== Sources ==
New York State Assembly
Preceded by Frank J. Pino	New York State Assembly; Kings County, 16th District; 1956–1959	Succeeded by Irwin Brownstein
