= Ralph Wilson Hoyt =

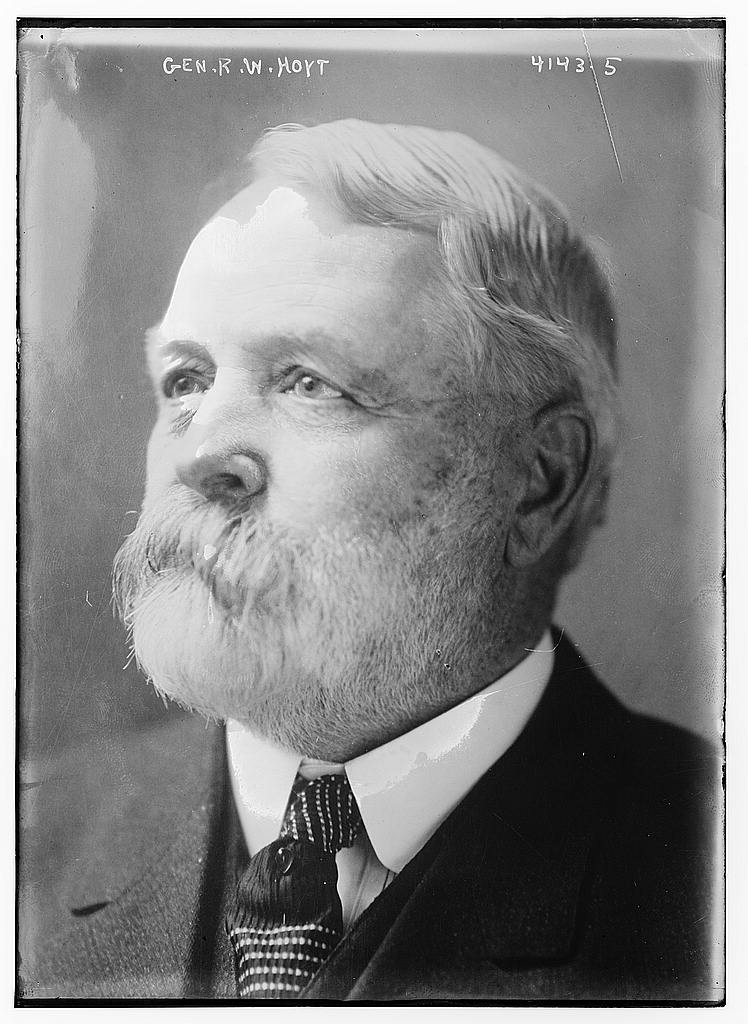
Ralph Wilson Hoyt In 1917

Brigadier General Ralph Wilson Hoyt (October 8, 1849 - November 3, 1920) was commander of the Department of the Lakes.

== Biography ==
He was born on October 8, 1849, in Milo, New York, to Benjamin Levi Hoyt and Celestia Ursula Mariner. He was admitted to the United States Military Academy at West Point, New York, in 1868, and he graduated in 1872.

He married Mary C. Cravens Hoyt (1860–1910), and she died in 1910.

On August 15, 1911, he replaced William Harding Carter in command of the maneuver brigade in Texas.

On October 10, 1911, he married Cora McKeever Harbold (1879–1946), a nurse, in Philadelphia, Pennsylvania.

He died on November 3, 1920, in Penn Yan, New York. He was buried in Lakeview Cemetery in Penn Yan, New York.
