= Harold A. Jerry Jr. =

American politician (1920–2001)

Member of the New York State Senate from the 49th district
- In office January 1, 1959 – December 31, 1962
- Preceded by: Harry K. Morton
- Succeeded by: William T. Smith

Personal details
- Born: Harold Anderson Jerry Jr. March 2, 1920 Plattsburgh, New York, U.S.
- Died: June 9, 2001 (aged 81) Albany, New York, U.S.
- Cause of death: Cancer
- Spouse: Jocelyn Rogers
- Children: 4
- Education: Princeton University; Harvard Law School
- Profession: Politician, lawyer

Military service
- Allegiance: United States
- Branch/service: United States Army
- Rank: Lieutenant colonel
- Battles/wars: World War II

Harold Anderson Jerry Jr. (March 2, 1920 – June 9, 2001) was an American lawyer and politician from New York.

== Life ==
He was born on March 2, 1920, in Plattsburgh, New York. He graduated from Princeton University in 1941. During World War II he served with the U.S. Army in Europe, and attained the rank of lieutenant colonel. He graduated from Harvard Law School in 1948. He was admitted to the bar, and practiced law in Elmira. He married Jocelyn Rogers, and they had four children. They lived in Southport.

Jerry was a member of the New York State Senate (49th D.) from 1959 to 1962, sitting in the 172nd and 173rd New York State Legislatures. In 1963, he was appointed as Director of the Office of Regional Development; later as Director of the Office of Planning Coordination; and in 1967 as Executive Director of the Temporary Commission on the Future of the Adirondacks. In 1970, the commission proposed legislation to preserve the environment of the area, and the creation of the Adirondack Park Agency. He was a member of the New York Public Service Commission from 1973 to 1997; and was Chairman in 1995.

He died on June 9, 2001, at his home in Albany, New York, of cancer.

His son Philip C. R. Jerry (1955–1996) was a dancer and choreographer who in 1994 choreographed a balletic adaptation of Our Town set to music by Aaron Copland.

== Sources ==
New York State Senate
Preceded by Harry K. Morton	New York State Senate; 49th District; 1959–1962	Succeeded by William T. Smith
