= William T. Smith =

American politician (1916–2010)

William T. Smith II

Member of the New York State Senate
- In office January 1, 1963 – December 31, 1986
- Preceded by: Harold A. Jerry, Jr.
- Succeeded by: Randy Kuhl
- Constituency: 49th district (1963-1965); 56th district (1966); 48th district (1967-1972); 51st district (1973-1982); 52nd district (1983-1986)

Personal details
- Born: January 25, 1916 Corning, New York, U.S.
- Died: March 30, 2010 (aged 94) Corning, New York, U.S.
- Party: Republican

William T. Smith II (January 25, 1916 – March 30, 2010) was an American farmer and politician from New York.

== Life ==
He was born on January 25, 1916, in Corning, New York. He attended the public schools in Big Flats, and Corning Free Academy. He graduated from the New York State College of Agriculture, Cornell University in 1938. Afterwards he farmed in Big Flats.

In 1961, he bought a Cadillac for $6,100 using money he gained from farm subsidies, which were intended to prop up crop prices by paying farmers not to grow crops. Smith, a fourth-generation farmer, drove the Cadillac around the district as a campaign prop demonstrating the largesse of the federal government's entitlement programs, and the next year managed to win the Republican primary in the 49th District, defeating the incumbent State Senator Harold A. Jerry, Jr. Afterwards he was nicknamed sometimes as Bill "Cadillac" Smith. He was a member of the New York State Senate from 1963 to 1986, sitting in the 174th, 175th, 176th, 177th, 178th, 179th, 180th, 181st, 182nd, 183rd, 184th, 185th and 186th New York State Legislatures.

Smith led a campaign against drunk driving, which stemmed from his daughter's death in a drunk driving related incident in 1973. Smith was noted for his staunch fiscal conservatism, pushed for cost estimates on state bills, and voted against the state enrolling in Medicaid (the only member of the entire New York legislature to do so) because he believed the cost would be much more than estimated. At one point he had reached the position of deputy majority leader.

He died on March 30, 2010, at the Founders Pavilion nursing home in Corning, New York.

New York State Senate
Preceded by Harold A. Jerry, Jr.	New York State Senate; 49th District; 1963–1965	Succeeded by Dalwin J. Niles
Preceded by Frank J. Glinski	New York State Senate; 56th District; 1966	Succeeded by James D. Griffin
Preceded by Ronald B. Stafford	New York State Senate; 48th District; 1967–1972	Succeeded by Edwyn E. Mason
Preceded by James E. Powers	New York State Senate; 51st District; 1973–1982	Succeeded by Warren M. Anderson
Preceded by L. Paul Kehoe	New York State Senate; 52nd District; 1983–1986	Succeeded by Randy Kuhl
