= Warren M. Anderson =

American politician (1915–2007)

Warren Mattice Anderson
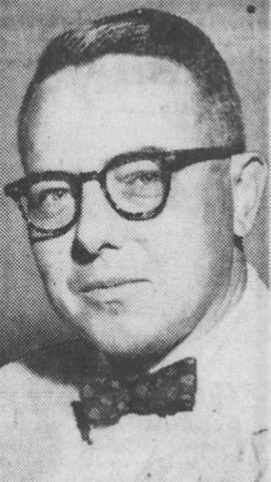
- The Binghamton Press, 8 September 1954

Acting Lieutenant Governor of New York
- In office December 18, 1973 – December 31, 1974
- Governor: Malcolm Wilson
- Preceded by: Malcolm Wilson
- Succeeded by: Mary Anne Krupsak
- In office February 1, 1985 – December 31, 1986
- Governor: Mario Cuomo
- Preceded by: Alfred DelBello
- Succeeded by: Stan Lundine

Temporary President and Majority Leader of the New York State Senate
- In office January 1, 1973 – December 31, 1988
- Preceded by: Earl Brydges
- Succeeded by: Ralph J. Marino

Member of the New York State Senate
- In office January 1, 1953 – December 31, 1988
- Preceded by: Orlo M. Brees
- Succeeded by: Thomas W. Libous
- Constituency: 45th district (1953-1954); 47th district (1955-1965); 55th district (1966); 47th district (1967-1982); 51st district (1983-1988)

Personal details
- Born: October 16, 1915 Bainbridge, New York, U.S.
- Died: June 1, 2007 (aged 91) Johnson City, New York, U.S.
- Party: Republican
- Parent: Floyd E. Anderson (father)
- Education: Colgate University; Albany Law School

Warren Mattice Anderson (October 16, 1915 – June 1, 2007) was an American lawyer and politician from New York. He was Temporary President and Majority Leader of the New York State Senate from 1973 to 1988.

== Life ==
He was born on October 16, 1915, in Bainbridge, Chenango County, New York, the son of Floyd E. Anderson (1891–1976), later a State Senator and Supreme Court Justice, and Edna Madeline (Mattice) Anderson (born 1889).

Anderson graduated from Colgate University in 1937, and from Albany Law School where he was an associate editor of the Albany Law Review. He served in the United States Army during World War II, attaining the rank of Second Lieutenant in the Judge Advocate General's Corps.

Following the war he served as Assistant County Attorney for Broome County, and then joined the Binghamton law firm of Hinman, Howard & Kattell.

A Republican, Anderson was a member of the New York State Senate from 1953 to 1989, sitting in the 169th, 170th, 171st, 172nd, 173rd, 174th, 175th, 176th, 177th, 178th, 179th, 180th, 181st, 182nd, 183rd, 184th, 185th, 186th and 187th New York State Legislatures. He was Chairman of the Committee on Finance from 1966 to 1972. In this capacity he was the unofficial deputy to Temporary President Earl Brydges. After Brydges retired, Anderson succeeded him as Temporary President and Majority Leader. Anderson worked with Governor Hugh Carey and Assembly Speaker Stanley Steingut to put together a package to rescue New York City from bankruptcy in 1975.

Anderson served in the Senate's top post until 1989, when he re-joined the law firm of Hinman, Howard & Kattell, LLP in Binghamton, New York. In May 2006, Anderson announced his endorsement of former Assembly Minority Leader John Faso for the Republican nomination for governor.

In his role as Temporary President of the Senate, Anderson twice performed the duties of the Lieutenant Governor of New York. The first was from December 18, 1973, to December 31, 1974, after the resignation of Gov. Nelson Rockefeller elevated Lt. Gov. Malcolm Wilson to the governorship. The second was from February 1, 1985, to December 31, 1986, after Lt. Gov. Alfred DelBello resigned.

In 1978, Anderson was a candidate for the Republican nomination for Governor of New York, but lost the nomination to Perry Duryea.

He died on June 1, 2007.

Interstate 88, which runs from the Southern Tier to the Capital District, was named in his honor.

New York State Senate
Preceded by Orlo M. Brees	New York State Senate; 45th District; 1953–1954	Succeeded by John H. Hughes
Preceded by George R. Metcalf	New York State Senate; 47th District; 1955–1964	Succeeded by Nathan Proller
Preceded by John H. Doerr	New York State Senate; 55th District; 1966	Succeeded by Frank J. Glinski
Preceded by Nathan Proller	New York State Senate; 47th District; 1967–1982	Succeeded by James H. Donovan
Preceded by William T. Smith	New York State Senate; 51st District; 1983–1988	Succeeded by Thomas W. Libous
Political offices
Preceded by Earl W. Brydges	Majority Leader of the New York State Senate; 1973–1988	Succeeded by Ralph J. Marino
Preceded by Malcolm Wilson	Lieutenant Governor of New York; Acting; 1973–1974	Succeeded by Mary Anne Krupsak
Preceded by Alfred DelBello	Lieutenant Governor of New York; Acting; 1985–1986	Succeeded by Stan Lundine
