= Roy M. Page =

American lawyer and politician

Roy Miller Page (September 7, 1890 – October 8, 1958) was an American lawyer and politician from New York.

== Life ==
He was born on September 7, 1890, in Fosterdale, Sullivan County, New York. He practiced law in Binghamton. He married Mary (1892–1955).

Page was a member of the New York State Senate (40th D.) from 1937 to 1942, sitting in the 160th, 161st, 162nd and 163rd New York State Legislatures. Then he was Surrogate of Broome County.

On April 19, 1944, he was indicted for grand larceny and was accused of retaining part of the salaries of persons he appointed to offices while being a state senator. He was tried before Supreme Court Justice Ely W. Personius in Kingston, and on July 18, 1944, was acquitted by the jury on all counts.

He died on October 8, 1958, in Roswell Park Memorial Institute in Buffalo, New York; and was buried at the Vestal Hills Memorial Park in Vestal.

== Sources ==
New York State Senate
Preceded by Martin W. Deyo	New York State Senate; 40th District; 1937–1942	Succeeded by Floyd E. Anderson
