= George L. Thompson =

American politician

Member of the New York State Senate from the 1st district
- In office January 1, 1915 – September 1, 1941
- Preceded by: Thomas H. O'Keefe
- Succeeded by: Perry B. Duryea

Personal details
- Born: November 22, 1864 Smithtown, New York
- Died: September 1, 1941 (aged 76) Kings Park, New York
- Party: Republican

George Lincoln Thompson (November 22, 1864 – September 1, 1941) was an American politician from New York.

== Life ==
He was the son of Richmond Ansel Thompson and Annie Elizabeth (Handshaw) Thompson. On June 12, 1894, he married Lottie F. Scott.

Thompson was a member of the New York State Assembly (Suffolk Co., 2nd D.) in 1909, 1910 and 1912; and was Chairman of the Committee on Public Institutions in 1912.

He was a member of the New York State Senate (1st D.) from 1915 until his death in 1941, sitting in the 138th, 139th, 140th, 141st, 142nd, 143rd, 144th, 145th, 146th, 147th, 148th, 149th, 150th, 151st, 152nd, 153rd, 154th, 155th, 156th, 157th, 158th, 159th, 160th, 161st, 162nd and 163rd New York State Legislatures.

He died on September 1, 1941, at his home in Kings Park, New York, of a heart attack; and was buried at the Episcopal Church Graveyard in St. James, New York.

== Sources ==
- Official New York from Cleveland to Hughes by Charles Elliott Fitch (Hurd Publishing Co., New York and Buffalo, 1911, Vol. IV; pg. 358f)
- G. THOMPSON DIES; STATE SENATOR, 76 in NYT on September 2, 1941 (subscription required)
- Thompson genealogy at Long Island genealogy

New York State Assembly
Preceded by Orlando Hubbs	New York State Assembly; Suffolk County, 2nd District; 1909–1910	Succeeded by Frederick Sheide
Preceded by Frederick Sheide	New York State Assembly; Suffolk County, 2nd District; 1912	Succeeded by John J. Robinson
New York State Senate
Preceded by Thomas H. O'Keefe	New York State Senate; 1st District; January 1, 1915 – September 1, 1941	Succeeded by Perry B. Duryea
