= Guy W. Cheney =

American politician

Guy Warren Cheney (February 26, 1886 – April 18, 1939) was an American lawyer and politician from New York.

== Life ==
He was born on February 26, 1886, in Fort Covington, Franklin County, New York, the son of Warren J. Cheney (1862–1921) and Elizabeth (Southwick) Cheney (died 1886). Warren Cheney was at the time a school principal in Fort Covington, and Elizabeth Cheney died a few days after Guy's birth. Warren Cheney then studied law, practiced in Corning, and eventually became County Judge of Steuben County.

Guy Cheney attended Corning Free Academy. He graduated Ph.B. from Syracuse University in 1908, and LL.B. from Syracuse University College of Law in 1910. He was admitted to the bar the same year, and practiced law in partnership with his father. On February 22, 1911, he married Edith Madison Costello (1888–1953), and they had four sons.

He was secretary of Congressman Alanson B. Houghton from 1919 to 1921. On November 27, 1921, Cheney was appointed as District Attorney of Steuben County, to fill a vacancy. He was elected to succeed himself in 1922, and re-elected in 1925 and 1928, remaining in office until the end of 1931.

He was a member of the New York State Assembly (Steuben Co., 1st D.) in 1937, 1938 and 1939.

He died during the legislative session on April 18, 1939, in Corning, New York, after an appendectomy; and was buried at the Hope Cemetery there. In November 1939, his widow was elected to succeed to his assembly seat.

== Sources ==
New York State Assembly
| Preceded by Wilson Messer | New York State Assembly; Steuben County, 1st District; 1937–1939 | Succeeded by Edith C. Cheney |
