= Salvatore T. DeMatteo =

American lawyer and politician (1911–2003)

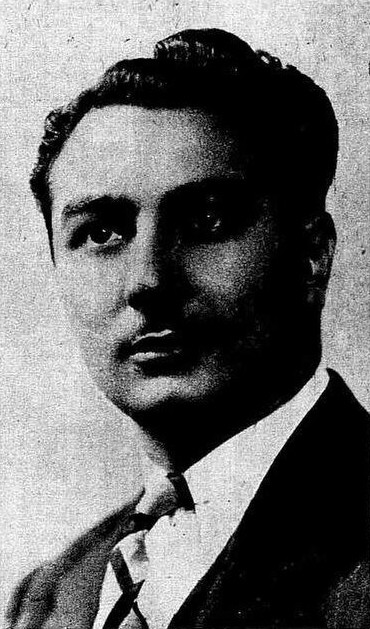
- DeMatteo c. 1940

Justice of the New York Supreme Court
- In office 1974–1981

Member of the New York State Assembly from the 16th Kings district
- In office January 1, 1938 – December 31, 1938
- Preceded by: Carmine J. Marasco
- Succeeded by: Carmine J. Marasco

Personal details
- Born: July 14, 1911
- Died: August 8, 2003 (aged 92)
- Party: American Labor; Liberal
- Education: St. John's University

Salvatore T. DeMatteo (July 14, 1911 – August 8, 2003) was an American lawyer and politician from New York.

== Life ==
He was born on July 14, 1911. He attended Brooklyn Technical High School, St. John's College and St. John's Law School. While studying, he worked as a telegraph messenger, as a newspaper copyboy, and wrote articles for an Italian-language paper. He was admitted to the bar and practiced law in Brooklyn.

DeMatteo was a member of the New York State Assembly in 1938, having been elected in November 1937 on the American Labor ticket in the 16th assembly district of Brooklyn. He was defeated for re-election in 1938, 1940 and 1941.

In February 1960, he was elected as Executive Secretary of the Liberal Party in Brooklyn.

He served as a justice of the Brooklyn Civil Court from 1969 to 1973, a justice of the New York Supreme Court from 1974 to 1981, and then as an Official Referee (i.e. a senior judge on an additional seat) of the Supreme Court.

He died on August 8, 2003, and was buried at the St. Charles Cemetery in Farmingdale.

== Sources ==
New York State Assembly
Preceded by Carmine J. Marasco	New York State Assembly; Kings County, 16th District; 1938	Succeeded by Carmine J. Marasco
