= Lake View Cemetery (Penn Yan, New York) =

Historic cemetery in New York, United States

- U.S. National Register of Historic Places
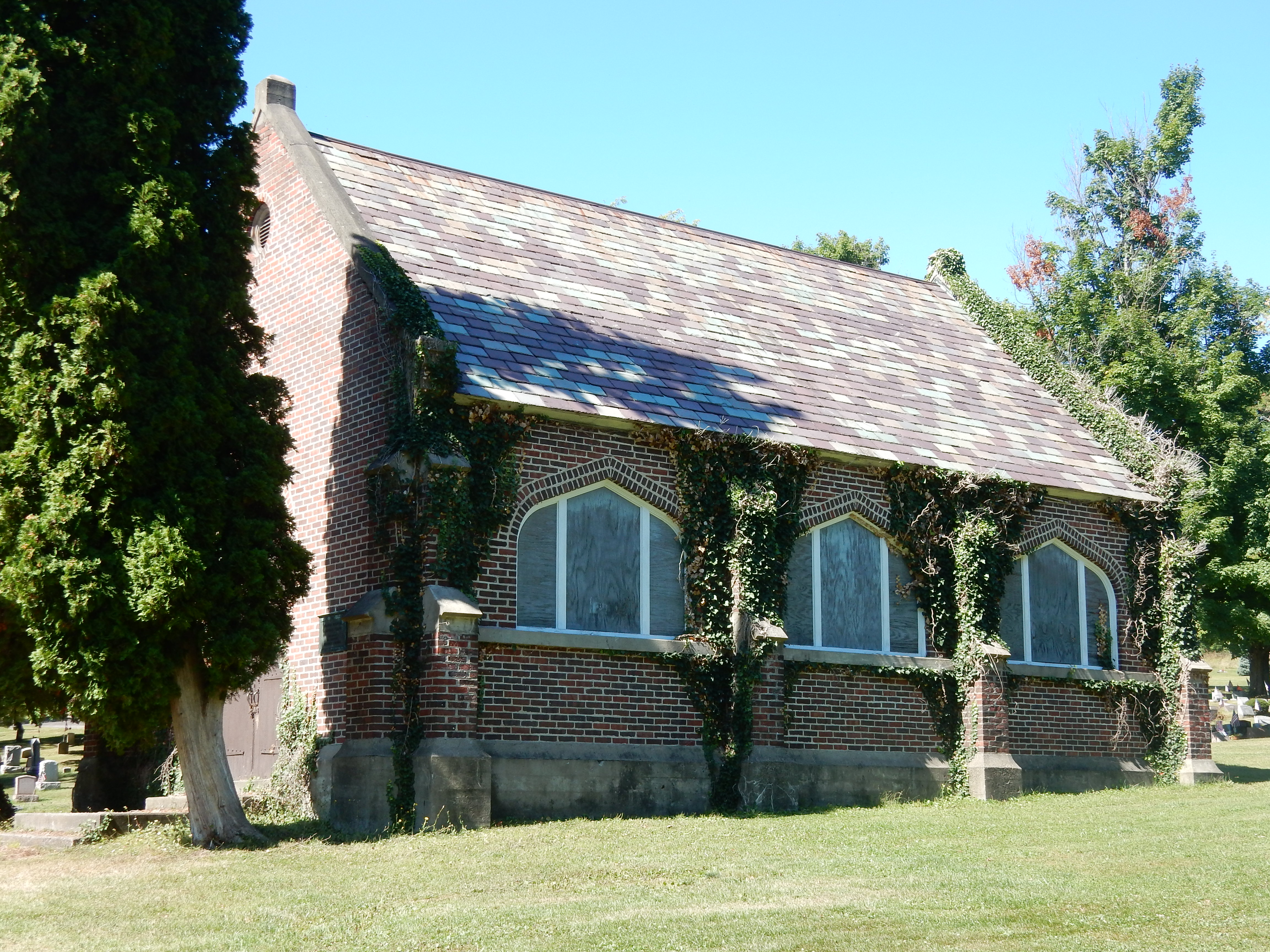
- Lake View Cemetery. Abraham Wagener Memorial Chapel.

- Location within New York Location within the United States
- Location: W. Lake Rd., Penn Yan, New York
- Coordinates: 42°39′41″N 77°3′51″W
- Area: 50 acres (20 ha)
- Architect: Taylor, Albert Davis
- NRHP reference No.: 96000137
- Added to NRHP: February 23, 1996

Lake View Cemetery is a historic cemetery located at Penn Yan in Yates County, New York. It is a 50-acre (20 ha) cemetery property that includes wooded and open acres included in the cemetery's historic landscape plan and developed in two phases between about 1855 and 1906. The property includes the Abraham Wagener Memorial Chapel, a two-story brick Gothic Revival structure built in 1923–1924. It was listed on the National Register of Historic Places in 1996.

== Notable burials ==
- Morris Brown, Jr. (1842–1864), Civil War Medal of Honor Recipient
- Samuel S. Ellsworth (1790–1863), New York's 26th District in the United States House of Representatives from 1845 to 1847
- Brigadier General Ralph Wilson Hoyt (1849–1920), commander of the Department of the Lakes
- Edward Johnston (1844–1920), Indian Wars Medal of Honor Recipient
- Joshua Lee (1783–1841), New York's 27th District in the United States House of Representatives from 1835 to 1837
- Daniel Morris (1812–1889), Civil War US Congressman
- Edwin C. Nutt (1868–1933), farmer and politician
- Andrew Oliver (1815–1889), US Congressman
- Brevet Major General John Morrison Oliver (1828–1872), Civil War general
- William Morrison Oliver (1792–1863), New York's 27th District in the United States House of Representatives from 1841 to 1843
- Elijah Spencer (1775–1852), US Congressman from 1821–1823
- Hanford Struble (1842–1903), lawyer, politician, and judge

== Gallery ==
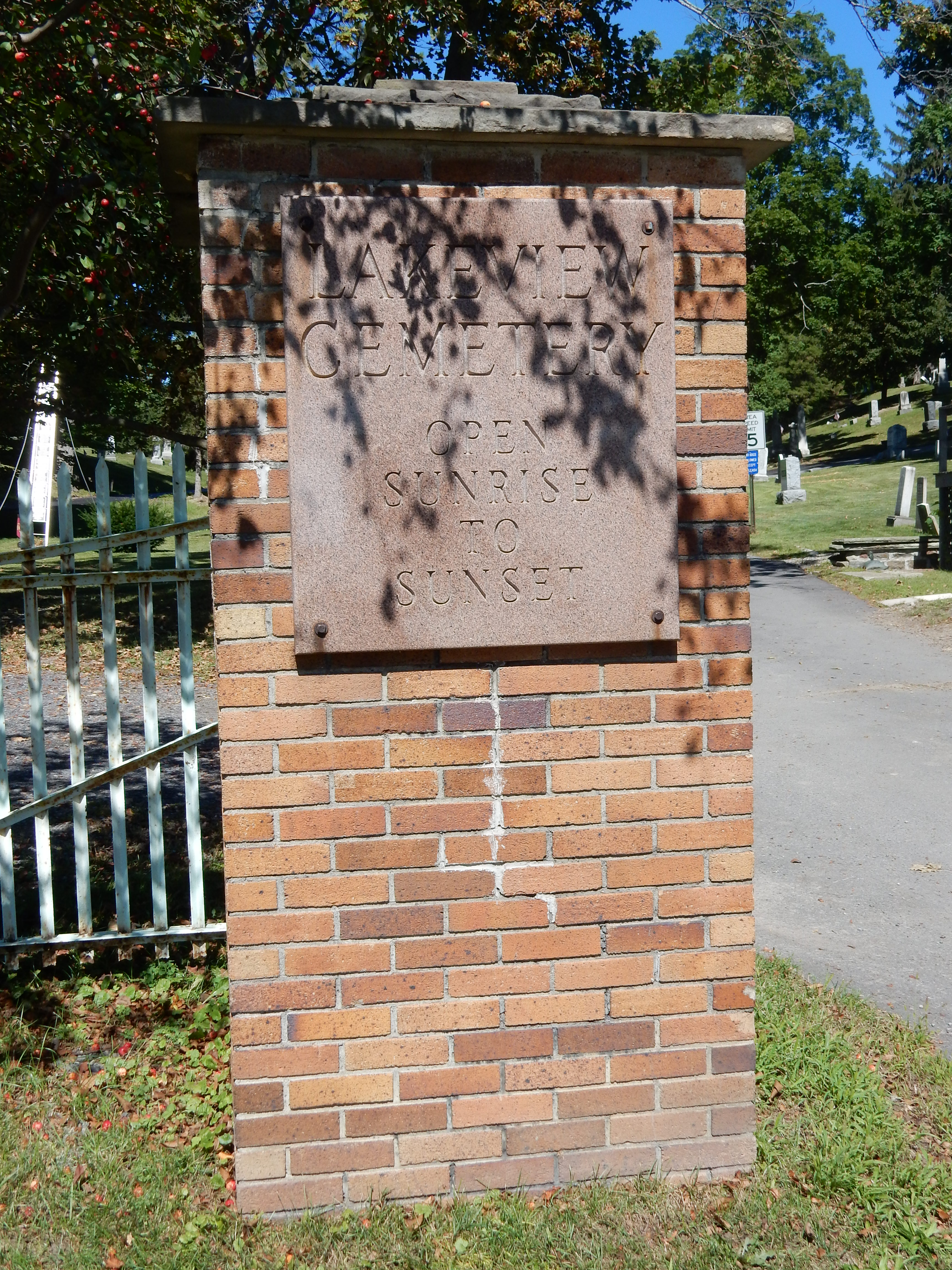
South gate.

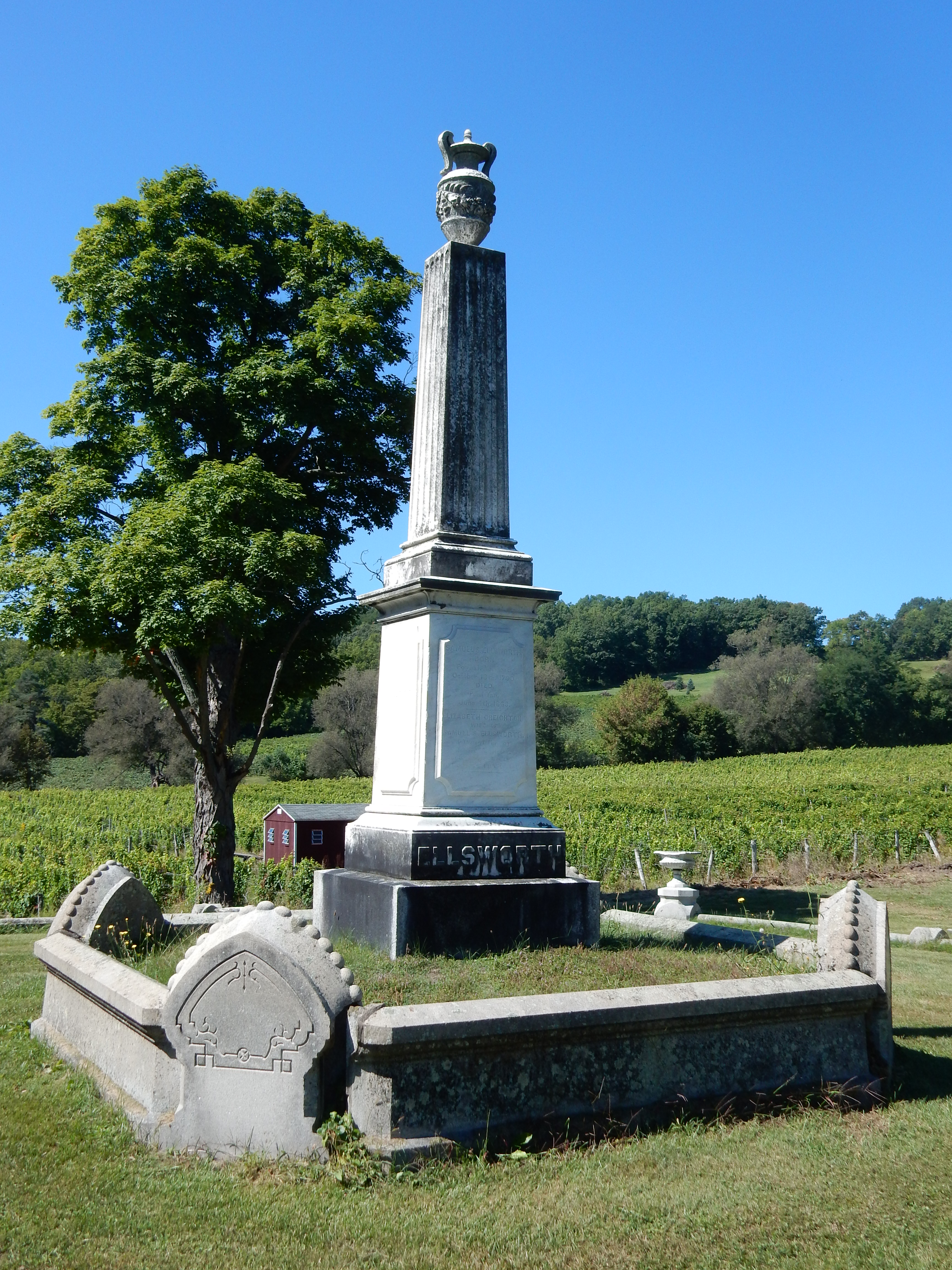
Ellsworth burial.

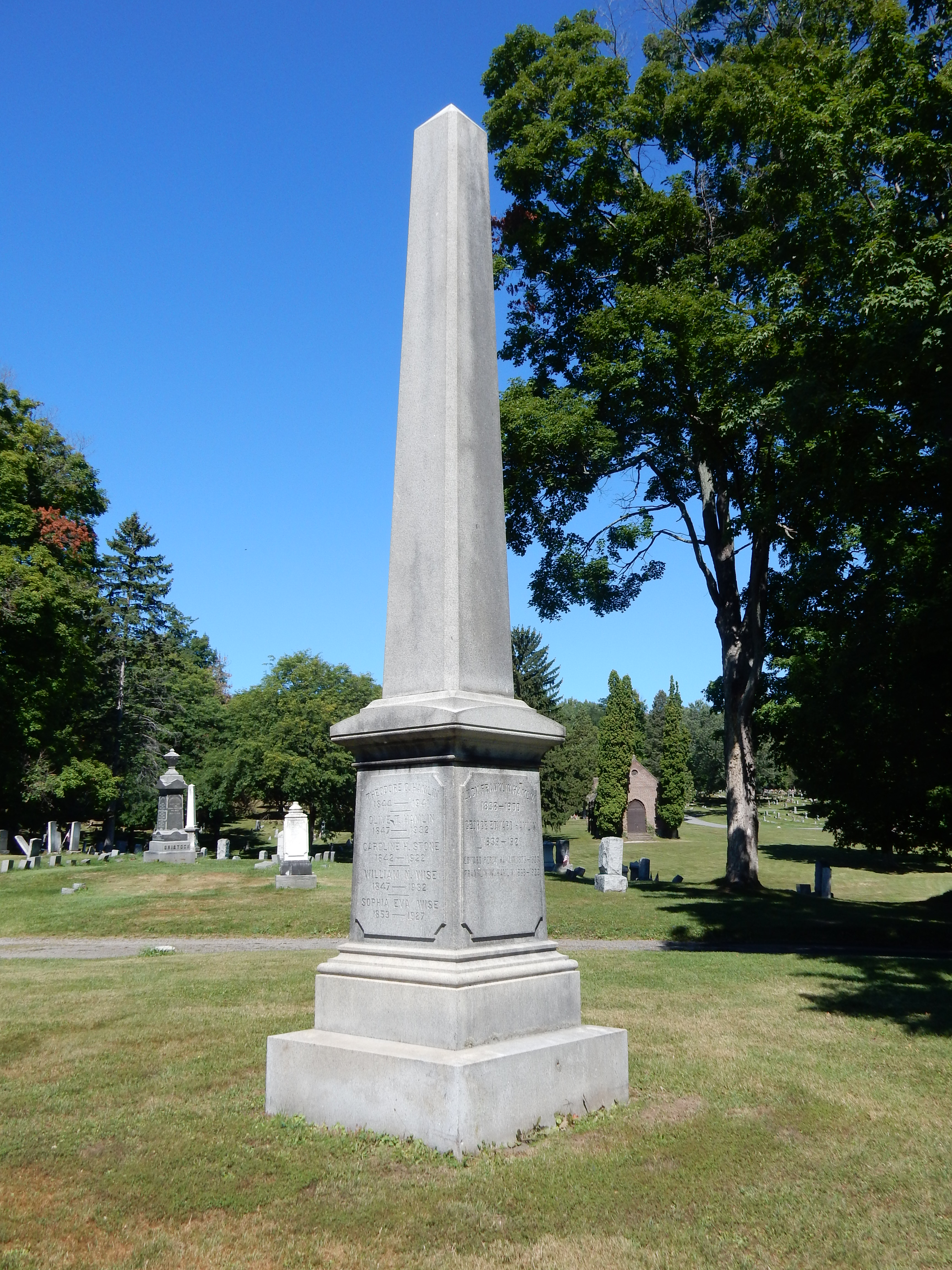
Hamlin burial.

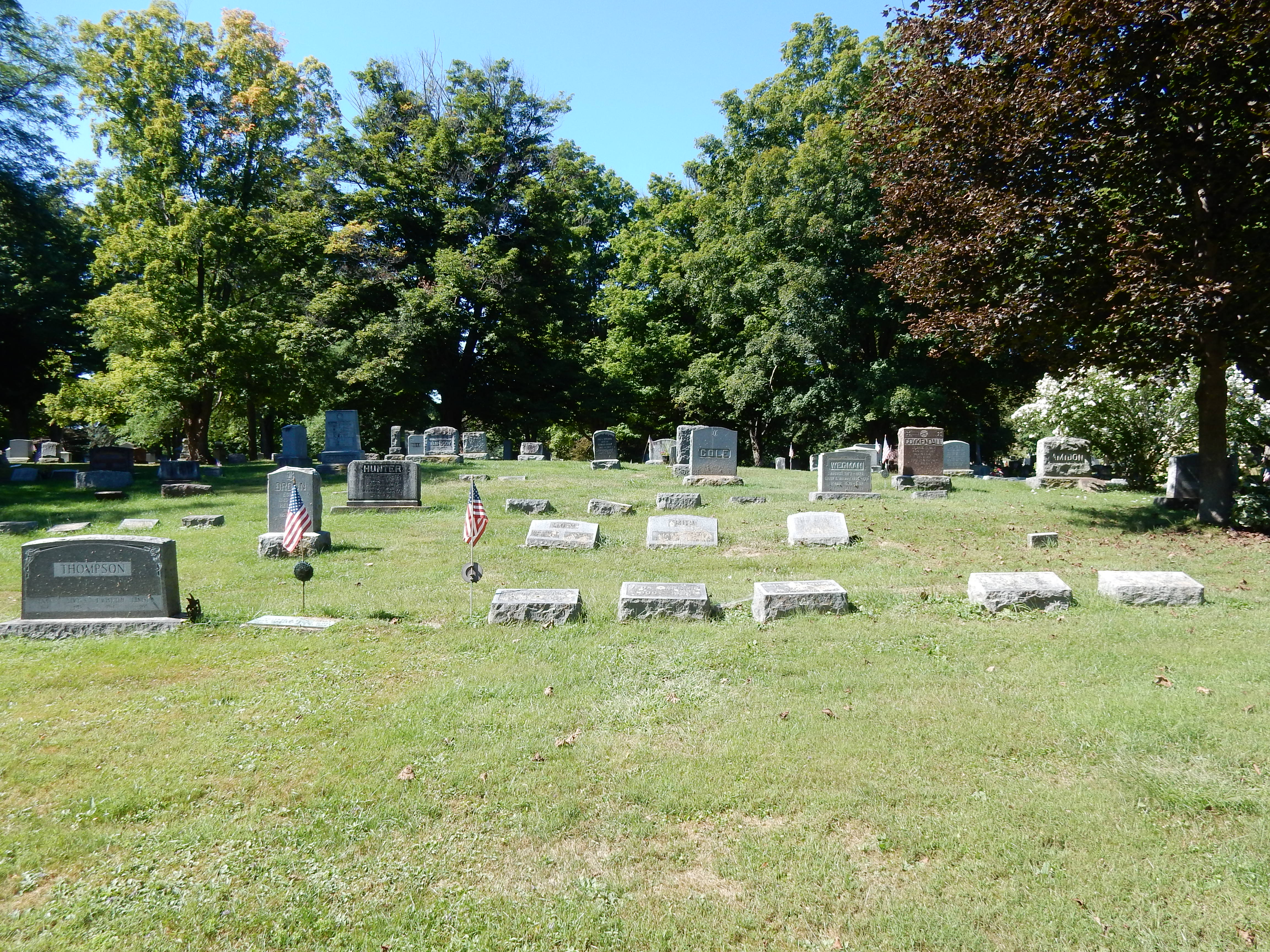
View of the Cemetery.
