= Orlo M. Brees =

American politician (1896–1980)

- Born: Orlo Marion Brees; April 13, 1896; Canton, Illinois, U.S.
- Died: November 1, 1980 (aged 84); Santa Clara, California, U.S.
- Occupations: Editor, author, lecturer, poet and politician
- Notable work: Spudville Philosophy and Phoolosophy; Endicott, NY: Endicott Printing, 1945
- Political party: Republican Party

Orlo Marion Brees (April 13, 1896 – November 1980) was an American newspaper editor, author, lecturer, poet, and politician from New York.

== Life ==
He was born on April 13, 1896, in Canton, Fulton County, Illinois, the son of Basil V. Brees and Maria (Orline) Brees. He attended the public schools in Glasford, Illinois; Shurtleff Academy in Alton, Illinois; Shurtleff College; Brown University; Columbia University; and University College in Southampton, England. He worked as a coal miner, textile worker, salesman, teacher, printer, editor, and publisher; and eventually settled in Endicott, Broome County, New York. In 1924, he married his second wife, Nina Vivian McBride of Ava, Illinois. Their daughter Vivian Ella was born on January 17, 1927. In 1933, he married Frances Willard Freeman, and their only child was Orlo Manford Brees (born 1939).

Brees was a member of the New York State Assembly (Broome Co., 2nd D.) from 1941 to 1952, sitting in the 163rd, 164th, 165th, 166th, 167th, and 168th New York State Legislatures. He resigned his seat after his election to the State Senate.

On February 13, 1952, Brees was elected to the New York State Senate (45th D.), to fill the vacancy caused by the appointment of Floyd E. Anderson to the New York Supreme Court.
He took his seat on February 18, 1952. and remained in the State Senate until the end of the session of the 168th New York State Legislature. In August 1952, Brees ran for re-nomination in the Republican primary, but was defeated by Floyd Anderson's son Warren M. Anderson.

Brees died in November 1980 in Santa Clara, California.

New York State Assembly
Preceded by Edward W. Walters	New York State Assembly; Broome County, 2nd District; 1941–1952	Succeeded by George L. Ingalls
New York State Senate
Preceded by Floyd E. Anderson	New York State Senate; 45th District; 1952	Succeeded by Warren M. Anderson
