= Philip M. Kleinfeld =

American lawyer and politician (1894–1971)

Philip M. Kleinfeld (June 19, 1894 – January 11, 1971) was an American lawyer and politician from New York.

== Early life ==
Kleinfeld was born to Max and Bertha Kleinfeld on the Lower East Side of New York City. He graduated from New York Law School in 1916, was admitted to the New York bar, and practiced with Samuel Kramer under the firm name of Kramer & Kleinfeld in New York City. He married Rose Meyers. He was the brother of Clara Kleinfeld and Yette Levine and the Uncle of New York Superior Court Justice Joseph Levine.

== Political and judicial career ==
Kleinfeld was elected to the New York State Assembly (Kings County, 16th District) in 1922. He was also a member of the New York State Senate (4th District) from 1923 to 1941, sitting in the 146th, 147th, 148th, 149th, 150th, 151st, 152nd, 153rd, 154th, 155th, 156th, 157th, 158th, 159th, 160th, 161st, 162nd and 163rd New York State Legislatures. During his tenure as senator, he wrote a bill to extend the right of jury service to women. He was also a delegate to the New York State Constitutional Convention of 1938.

On January 13, 1941, New York Governor Herbert H. Lehman appointed Kleinfeld to the New York Supreme Court (2nd District) to fill the vacancy caused by the election of Albert Conway to the New York Court of Appeals. After the removal of the prohibition on sitting state senators being nominated to judicial posts at the 1938 New York State Constitutional Convention, Kleinfeld became the first to be so appointed. In November 1941, he was elected to a fourteen-year term. He was re-elected in November 1955, but on December 31, 1955, was designated by Governor Averell Harriman to the Appellate Division Second Department.

== Later life ==
Kleinfeld retired from the bench at the end of 1970 and died of heart disease on January 11, 1971, in New York Hospital in Manhattan. He was buried in Montefiore Cemetery in Queens.

New York State Assembly
Preceded by Leon G. Moses	New York State Assembly; Kings County, 16th District; 1922	Succeeded by James F. Kiernan
New York State Senate
Preceded by Maxwell S. Harris	New York State Senate; 4th District; 1923–1941	Succeeded by Carmine J. Marasco

== Sources ==
- Bio at New York Court History
