= 163rd New York State Legislature =

New York state legislative session

←	162nd	164th	→
- New York State Capitol (2009)

Overview
- Legislative body: New York State Legislature
- Jurisdiction: New York, United States
- Term: January 1, 1941 – December 31, 1942

Senate
- Members: 51
- President: Lt. Gov. Charles Poletti (D)
- Temporary President: Joe R. Hanley (R)
- Party control: Republican (30–21)

Assembly
- Members: 150
- Speaker: Oswald D. Heck (R)
- Party control: Republican (87–62–1)

Sessions
- 1st: January 8 – April 4, 1941
- 2nd: January 7 – April 24, 1942

The 163rd New York State Legislature, consisting of the New York State Senate and the New York State Assembly, met from January 8, 1941, to April 24, 1942, during the ninth and tenth years of Herbert H. Lehman's governorship, in Albany.

== Background ==
Under the provisions of the New York Constitution of 1894, re-apportioned in 1917, and amended in 1937, 51 Senators and 150 assemblymen were elected in single-seat districts for two-year terms. The senatorial districts consisted either of one or more entire counties; or a contiguous area within a single county. The counties which were divided into more than one senatorial district were New York (nine districts), Kings (eight), Bronx (three), Erie (three), Monroe (two), Queens (two) and Westchester (two). The Assembly districts were made up of contiguous area, all within the same county.

At this time there were two major political parties: the Democratic Party and the Republican Party. The American Labor Party endorsed the whole Democratic ticket, which included one Republican judge of the Court of Appeals. The Prohibition Party also nominated a ticket.

== Elections ==
The 1940 New York state election was held on November 5. All six statewide elective offices were carried by the nominees on the Democratic-American Labor fusion ticket. The approximate party strength at this election, as gathered from the results, was: Democrats 2,843,000; Republicans 2,837,000; American Labor 365,000; and Prohibition 5,000.

All three women legislators—State Senator Rhoda Fox Graves (Rep.), of Gouverneur; and Assemblywomen Jane H. Todd (Rep.), of Tarrytown, and Edith C. Cheney (Rep.), of Corning—were re-elected.

The 1941 New York state election was held on November 4. Two vacancies in the State Senate and two vacancies in the State Assembly were filled.

On March 10, 1942, Mary A. Gillen, the widow of Assemblyman Michael J. Gillen, was elected to the seat previously held by her husband.

== Sessions ==
The Legislature met for the first regular session (the 164th) at the State Capitol in Albany on January 8, 1941; and adjourned at 2.30 a.m. on April 4.

Oswald D. Heck (Rep.) was re-elected Speaker.

Joe R. Hanley (Rep.) was re-elected Temporary President of the State Senate.

On December 7, 1941, happened the Attack on Pearl Harbor, and the United States entered World War II. Subsequently, some legislators resigned their seats to join the armed forces, among them Robert F. Wagner Jr., Phelps Phelps, Francis E. Dorn and Henry J. Latham.

The Legislature met for the second regular session (the 165th) at the State Capitol in Albany on January 7, 1942; and adjourned on April 24.

== State Senate ==
=== Districts ===
- 1st District: Nassau and Suffolk counties
- 2nd and 3rd District: Parts of Queens County, i.e. the Borough of Queens
- 4th, 5th, 6th, 7th, 8th, 9th, 10th and 11th District: Parts of Kings County, i.e. the Borough of Brooklyn
- 12th, 13th, 14th, 15th, 16th, 17th, 18th, 19th and 20th District: Parts of New York County, i.e. the Borough of Manhattan
- 21st, 22nd and 23rd District: Parts of Bronx County, i.e. the Borough of the Bronx
- 24th District: Richmond County, i.e. the Borough of Richmond (now the Borough of Staten Island), and Rockland County
- 25th District: Part of Westchester County
- 26th District: Cortlandt, Greenburgh, Mount Pleasant, Ossining and part of Yonkers; in Westchester County
- 27th District: Orange and Sullivan counties
- 28th District: Columbia, Dutchess and Putnam counties
- 29th District: Delaware, Greene and Ulster counties
- 30th District: Albany County
- 31st District: Rensselaer County
- 32nd District: Saratoga and Schenectady counties
- 33rd District: Clinton, Essex, Warren and Washington counties
- 34th District: Franklin and St. Lawrence counties
- 35th District: Fulton, Hamilton, Herkimer and Lewis counties
- 36th District: Oneida County
- 37th District: Jefferson and Oswego counties
- 38th District: Onondaga County
- 39th District: Madison, Montgomery, Otsego and Schoharie counties
- 40th District: Broome, Chenango and Cortland counties
- 41st District: Chemung, Schuyler, Tioga and Tompkins counties
- 42nd District: Cayuga, Seneca and Wayne counties
- 43rd District: Ontario, Steuben and Yates counties
- 44th District: Allegany, Genesee, Livingston and Wyoming
- 45th and 46th District: Monroe County
- 47th District: Niagara and Orleans counties
- 48th, 49th and 50th District: Erie County
- 51st District: Cattaraugus and Chautauqua counties

=== Members ===
The asterisk (*) denotes members of the previous Legislature who continued in office as members of this Legislature. Francis J. McCaffrey Jr and Charles O. Burney Jr changed from the Assembly to the Senate at the beginning of this Legislature. Assemblymen Carmine J. Marasco and William Kirnan were elected to fill vacancies in the Senate.

Note: For brevity, the chairmanships omit the words "...the Committee on (the)..."

District	Senator	Party	Notes
1st	George L. Thompson*	Republican	Chairman of Finance; died on September 1, 1941
1st	Perry B. Duryea Sr.	Republican	on November 4, 1941, elected to fill vacancy
2nd	Seymour Halpern	Republican	
3rd	Peter T. Farrell*	Democrat	
4th	Philip M. Kleinfeld*	Democrat	on January 13, 1941, appointed to the NY Supreme Court
4th	Carmine J. Marasco	Democrat	on February 18, 1941, elected to fill vacancy
5th	John J. Howard*	Democrat	died on January 24, 1941
5th	William Kirnan	Democrat	on March 11, 1941, elected to fill vacancy
6th	Edward J. Coughlin*	Democrat	
7th	Jacob J. Schwartzwald*	Democrat	on September 9, 1942, appointed to the NYC City Court
8th	Joseph A. Esquirol*	Democrat	
9th	Daniel Gutman*	Democrat	
10th	Jeremiah F. Twomey*	Democrat	
11th	James J. Crawford*	Democrat	
12th	Elmer F. Quinn*	Democrat	
13th	Phelps Phelps*	Democrat	on February 16, 1942, gave notice of his return to active duty in the U.S. Army
14th	William J. Murray*	Democrat	
15th	John L. Buckley*	Democrat	
16th	Francis J. McCaffrey Jr.*	Democrat	on November 4, 1941, elected to the NYC Municipal Court
16th	Thomas G. Brennan	Democrat	on January 13, 1942, elected to fill vacancy; and took his seat on January 26
17th	Frederic R. Coudert Jr.*	Republican	
18th	Charles Muzzicato	Rep./Am. Labor	Chairman of Public Health
19th	Charles D. Perry*	Democrat	
20th	Alexander A. Falk	Democrat	
21st	Lazarus Joseph*	Democrat	
22nd	Carl Pack*	Democrat	
23rd	John J. Dunnigan*	Democrat	Minority Leader
24th	Robert E. Johnson	Republican	
25th	Pliny W. Williamson*	Republican	
26th	William F. Condon*	Republican	
27th	Thomas C. Desmond*	Republican	
28th	Allan A. Ryan Jr.*	Republican	
29th	Arthur H. Wicks*	Republican	Chairman of Civil Service; Chairman of Finance, from September 17, 1941
30th	Erastus Corning 2nd*	Democrat	resigned on August 1, 1941, to run for Mayor of Albany
30th	Julian B. Erway	Democrat	on November 4, 1941, elected to fill vacancy
31st	Clifford C. Hastings*	Republican	Chairman of Civil Service, from January 7, 1942
32nd	Gilbert T. Seelye*	Republican	
33rd	Benjamin F. Feinberg*	Republican	
34th	Rhoda Fox Graves*	Republican	
35th	Fred A. Young*	Republican	
36th	William H. Hampton*	Republican	
37th	Isaac B. Mitchell*	Republican	
38th	G. Frank Wallace	Republican	
39th	Walter W. Stokes*	Rep./Am. Labor	
40th	Roy M. Page*	Republican	
41st	Chauncey B. Hammond*	Republican	
42nd	Henry W. Griffith*	Republican	
43rd	Earle S. Warner*	Republican	
44th	Joe R. Hanley*	Republican	re-elected Temporary President
45th	Rodney B. Janes*	Republican	
46th	Karl K. Bechtold*	Republican	resigned in April 1942, and joined the USNR
47th	William Bewley*	Republican	Chairman of Taxation and Retrenchment
48th	Walter J. Mahoney*	Republican	
49th	Stephen J. Wojtkowiak*	Dem./Am. Labor	
50th	Charles O. Burney Jr.*	Republican	Chairman of Affairs of Villages
51st	James W. Riley*	Republican	

=== Employees ===
- Clerk: William S. King
- Assistant Clerk: Fred J. Slater
- Sergeant-at-Arms: Harold W. Cole
- Assistant Sergeant-at-Arms: Henry Whitbeck
- Principal Doorkeeper: Lynn Corman
- Assistant Doorkeeper: Irving Hoag
- Stenographer: John K. Marshall

== State Assembly ==
=== Assemblymen ===
Note: For brevity, the chairmanships omit the words "...the Committee on (the)..."

District		Assemblymen	Party	Notes
Albany	1st	George W. Foy*	Democrat	
Albany	2nd	Mortimer A. Cullen	Democrat	
Albany	3rd	John McBain*	Rep./Am. Labor	
Allegany		William H. MacKenzie*	Republican	
Bronx	1st	Matthew J. H. McLaughlin*	Democrat	
Bronx	2nd	Patrick J. Fogarty*	Democrat	
Bronx	3rd	Arthur Wachtel*	Democrat	
Bronx	4th	Isidore Dollinger*	Democrat	
Bronx	5th	Julius J. Gans*	Democrat	
Bronx	6th	Peter A. Quinn*	Democrat	
Bronx	7th	Louis Bennett*	Democrat	
Bronx	8th	John A. Devany Jr.*	Democrat	
Broome	1st	Floyd E. Anderson	Republican	
Broome	2nd	Orlo M. Brees	Republican	
Cattaraugus		Leo P. Noonan	Republican	
Cayuga		James H. Chase*	Republican	
Chautauqua	1st	E. Herman Magnuson	Rep./Am. Labor	
Chautauqua	2nd	Carl E. Darling*	Republican	
Chemung		Harry J. Tifft*	Republican	
Chenango		Irving M. Ives*	Republican	Majority Leader
Clinton		Leslie G. Ryan*	Republican	
Columbia		Frederick A. Washburn*	Republican	
Cortland		Harold L. Creal*	Republican	
Delaware		William T. A. Webb*	Republican	
Dutchess	1st	Howard N. Allen*	Republican	
Dutchess	2nd	Emerson D. Fite*	Republican	
Erie	1st	Frank A. Gugino*	Republican	
Erie	2nd	Harold B. Ehrlich*	Republican	
Erie	3rd	Fred Hammer	Dem./Am. Labor	
Erie	4th	Frank J. Caffery	Dem./Am. Labor	resigned on November 16, 1942, and went to war
Erie	5th	Philip V. Baczkowski	Dem./Am. Labor	
Erie	6th	Jerome C. Kreinheder*	Republican	
Erie	7th	Justin C. Morgan	Republican	
Erie	8th	John R. Pillion	Republican	
Essex		Sheldon F. Wickes*	Republican	
Franklin		William L. Doige*	Republican	
Fulton and Hamilton		(Denton D. Lake)*	Republican	died on January 5, 1941, before the Legislature met
Fulton and Hamilton		Joseph R. Younglove	Republican	on February 18, 1941, elected to fill vacancy
Genesee		Herbert A. Rapp*	Republican	
Greene		William E. Brady*	Republican	
Herkimer		Leo A. Lawrence*	Republican	
Jefferson		Russell Wright*	Republican	
Kings	1st	Lewis W. Olliffe	Republican	
Kings	2nd	Leo F. Rayfiel*	Democrat	
Kings	3rd	Michael J. Gillen*	Democrat	died on February 1, 1942
Kings	3rd	Mary A. Gillen	Dem./Rep.	on March 10, 1942, elected to fill vacancy
Kings	4th	Bernard Austin*	Democrat	
Kings	5th	John R. Starkey	Dem./Am. Labor	
Kings	6th	Robert J. Crews*	Rep./Am. Labor	
Kings	7th	William Kirnan*	Democrat	resigned on January 31, 1941, to run for the State Senate
Kings	7th	John F. Furey	Democrat	on March 11, 1941, elected to fill vacancy
Kings	8th	Charles J. Beckinella*	Democrat	
Kings	9th	Edgar F. Moran*	Democrat	
Kings	10th	Francis E. Dorn	Republican	resigned on April 1, 1942, and went to war
Kings	11th	Eugene F. Bannigan	Democrat	
Kings	12th	James W. Feely*	Democrat	
Kings	13th	Ralph Schwartz*	Dem./Am. Labor	
Kings	14th	Harry Gittleson	Dem./Am. Labor	
Kings	15th	John Smolenski*	Dem./Am. Labor	
Kings	16th	Carmine J. Marasco*	Democrat	resigned on January 14, 1941, to run for the State Senate
Kings	16th	Louis L. Friedman	Democrat	on February 18, 1941, elected to fill vacancy
Kings	17th	Fred G. Moritt*	Dem./Am. Labor	
Kings	18th	Irwin Steingut*	Dem./Am. Labor	Minority Leader
Kings	19th	Max M. Turshen*	Democrat	
Kings	20th	Roy H. Rudd*	Democrat	
Kings	21st	Thomas A. Dwyer*	Democrat	
Kings	22nd	James A. Corcoran*	Democrat	
Kings	23rd	Robert Giordano*	Democrat	
Lewis		Benjamin H. Demo	Republican	
Livingston		James J. Wadsworth*	Republican	resigned on May 27, 1941
Livingston		Joseph W. Ward	Republican	on November 4, 1941, elected to fill vacancy
Madison		Wheeler Milmoe*	Republican	
Monroe	1st	Frank J. Sellmayer Jr.*	Republican	
Monroe	2nd	Abraham Schulman*	Republican	
Monroe	3rd	George T. Manning*	Republican	
Monroe	4th	Nelson E. Owen Jr.	Democrat	
Monroe	5th	William B. Mann*	Republican	
Montgomery		John F. Bennison	Republican	
Nassau	1st	John D. Bennett*	Republican	
Nassau	2nd	Norman F. Penny*	Republican	
New York	1st	James J. Dooling*	Democrat	
New York	2nd	Louis DeSalvio	Democrat	
New York	3rd	Maurice E. Downing*	Democrat	
New York	4th	Leonard Farbstein*	Democrat	
New York	5th	Owen McGivern*	Democrat	
New York	6th	Morris M. Mintz	Democrat	
New York	7th	Irwin D. Davidson*	Democrat	
New York	8th	Stephen J. Jarema*	Democrat	
New York	9th	Ira H. Holley*	Democrat	
New York	10th	MacNeil Mitchell*	Republican	
New York	11th	Patrick H. Sullivan*	Democrat	
New York	12th	Edmund J. Delany*	Democrat	
New York	13th	James T. McNamara	Democrat	
New York	14th	Warren J. McCarron	Democrat	
New York	15th	Abbot Low Moffat*	Republican	Chairman of Ways and Means
New York	16th	Robert F. Wagner Jr.*	Dem./Am. Labor	resigned on January 13, 1942, and went to war
New York	16th	John P. Morrissey	Dem./Am. Labor	on March 10, 1942, elected to fill vacancy
New York	17th	Hulan E. Jack	Democrat	
New York	18th	Hamlet O. Catenaccio	Rep./Am. Labor	
New York	19th	Daniel L. Burrows*	Democrat	
New York	20th	Anthony Guida*	Democrat	
New York	21st	William T. Andrews*	Democrat	
New York	22nd	Daniel Flynn*	Democrat	
New York	23rd	William J. A. Glancy*	Democrat	
Niagara	1st	Jacob E. Hollinger	Republican	
Niagara	2nd	Harry D. Suitor*	Republican	
Oneida	1st	Frank A. Emma	Democrat	
Oneida	2nd	William R. Williams*	Republican	
Oneida	3rd	C. Dean Williams*	Republican	
Onondaga	1st	Leo W. Breed*	Republican	
Onondaga	2nd	George B. Parsons*	Republican	
Onondaga	3rd	Frank J. Costello*	Republican	
Ontario		Harry R. Marble*	Republican	
Orange	1st	Lee B. Mailler*	Republican	
Orange	2nd	Charles N. Hammond*	Republican	
Orleans		John S. Thompson*	Republican	
Oswego		Ernest J. Lonis*	Republican	
Otsego		Chester T. Backus*	Republican	
Putnam		D. Mallory Stephens*	Republican	
Queens	1st	Mario J. Cariello*	Democrat	resigned on September 25, 1941, to run for Municipal Court
Queens	1st	Charles J. Dalzell	Democrat	on November 4, 1941, elected to fill vacancy
Queens	2nd	George F. Torsney	Democrat	died on December 28, 1942
Queens	3rd	John V. Downey*	Democrat	
Queens	4th	Henry J. Latham	Republican	in July 1942, joined the U.S. Navy
Queens	5th	John H. Ferril*	Democrat	
Queens	6th	George Archinal	Republican	
Rensselaer	1st	J. Eugene Zimmer	Am. Labor/Rep.	
Rensselaer	2nd	Maurice Whitney*	Republican	Chairman of Taxation
Richmond	1st	Charles Bormann*	Democrat	
Richmond	2nd	Albert V. Maniscalco*	Democrat	
Rockland		Robert Doscher	Republican	
St. Lawrence	1st	Grant F. Daniels*	Republican	
St. Lawrence	2nd	Allan P. Sill	Republican	
Saratoga		Richard J. Sherman*	Republican	
Schenectady	1st	Oswald D. Heck*	Republican	re-elected Speaker
Schenectady	2nd	Harold Armstrong*	Republican	
Schoharie		Arthur L. Parsons*	Republican	
Schuyler		Dutton Peterson*	Republican	
Seneca		Lawrence W. Van Cleef*	Republican	
Steuben	1st	Edith C. Cheney*	Republican	
Steuben	2nd	William M. Stuart*	Republican	
Suffolk	1st	Edmund R. Lupton*	Republican	
Suffolk	2nd	Elisha T. Barrett*	Republican	
Sullivan		James G. Lyons*	Democrat	
Tioga		Myron D. Albro*	Republican	
Tompkins		Stanley C. Shaw*	Republican	
Ulster		John F. Wadlin	Republican	
Warren		Harry A. Reoux*	Republican	Chairman of Judiciary
Washington		Henry Neddo	Republican	
Wayne		Henry V. Wilson	Republican	previously a member from Ontario Co.
Westchester	1st	Christopher H. Lawrence*	Republican	
Westchester	2nd	Theodore Hill Jr.*	Republican	
Westchester	3rd	James E. Owens*	Republican	
Westchester	4th	Jane H. Todd*	Republican	
Westchester	5th	Malcolm Wilson*	Republican	
Wyoming		Harold C. Ostertag*	Republican	
Yates		Fred S. Hollowell*	Republican	

=== Employees ===
- Clerk: Ansley B. Borkowski
- Sergeant-at-Arms: Richard Schnor
- First Assistant Doorkeeper: Joseph G. Bates
- Second Assistant Doorkeeper: M. C. Mansolillo
- Stenographer: Walter F. Berry

== Sources ==
- Your Representatives in the Legislature and in Congress; Legislature for 1941–1942 in The State Employee (November 1940, Vol. 9, No. 8, pg. 264f)
- Members of the New York Senate (1940s) at Political Graveyard
- Members of the New York Assembly (1940s) at Political Graveyard
- GOP LEGISLATORS RETAIN LEADERS in the Daily Sentinel, of Rome, on January 8, 1941
