= William H. Hampton =

American lawyer and politician (1893–1957)

Member of the New York State Senate from the 36th district
- In office January 1, 1935 – December 31, 1944
- Preceded by: Michael J. Kernan
- Succeeded by: Gilbert T. Seelye

Personal details
- Born: 1893 Scotland
- Died: February 27, 1957 (aged 63–64) Utica, New York, U.S.
- Spouse: Esther Kolpien (m. 1923)
- Children: 2
- Parent(s): Edward Mackie Hampton; Agnes Hately
- Education: Syracuse University College of Law
- Profession: Politician, lawyer

Military service
- Allegiance: United States
- Branch/service: United States Army
- Rank: Lieutenant
- Battles/wars: World War II

William H. Hampton (1893 – February 27, 1957) was an American lawyer and politician from New York.

== Life ==
He was born in 1893 in Scotland, the son of Edward Mackie Hampton (1862–1934) and Agnes (Hately) Hampton (1866–1961). He graduated from Gouverneur High School, in Gouverneur, New York, in 1913; and from Syracuse University College of Law in 1916. During World War I, he served with the 301st Engineers of the U.S. Army, and finished the war as a lieutenant.

After the war, he practiced law in Utica, and was a Justice of the Peace. On September 4, 1923, he married Esther Kolpien, and they had two sons. He was a U.S. Commissioner for the Northern District of New York from 1927 to 1934.

Hampton was a member of the New York State Senate (36th D.) from 1935 to 1944, sitting in the 158th, 159th, 160th, 161st, 162nd, 163rd and 164th New York State Legislatures.

He died on February 27, 1957, in Faxton Hospital in Utica, New York, after a heart attack.

== Sources ==
New York State Senate
Preceded by Michael J. Kernan	New York State Senate; 36th District; 1935–1944	Succeeded by Gilbert T. Seelye
