= Irwin Brownstein =

American lawyer and politician (1930–1996)

Irwin R. Brownstein

New York Supreme Court
- In office November 1968 – 1980

New York State Senate
- In office 1964–1966
- Preceded by: Frank J. Pino
- Succeeded by: Martin J. Knorr

New York State Assembly
- In office 1960–1963
- Preceded by: Bernard Haber
- Succeeded by: Salvatore J. Grieco

Personal details
- Born: November 4, 1930 New York City, New York, U.S.
- Died: March 24, 1996 (aged 66) Miami Beach, Florida, U.S.
- Children: 1+
- Education: Brooklyn College; Brooklyn Law School

Irwin R. Brownstein (November 4, 1930 – March 24, 1996) was an American lawyer and politician from New York.

== Early life and education ==
He was born on November 4, 1930, in New York City. He attended the public schools in Brooklyn. He graduated from Brooklyn College in 1950, and from Brooklyn Law School in 1953. He was admitted to the bar in 1953, and practiced law in New York City.

== Career ==
He was a member of the New York State Assembly (Kings Co., 16th D.) from 1960 to 1963, sitting in the 172nd, 173rd and 174th New York State Legislatures. He resigned his seat in 1963 to run for the State Senate seat vacated by Frank J. Pino.

He was a member of the New York State Senate from 1964 to 1966, sitting in the 174th, 175th and 176th New York State Legislatures. In November 1966, he was elected to the New York City Civil Court.

In November 1968, he was elected to the New York Supreme Court. In June 1973, he was one of the three party designees for Chief Judge of the New York Court of Appeals who were defeated by challenger Jacob D. Fuchsberg in the Democratic primary. Brownstein resigned from the bench in 1980, and resumed his private practice instead, specialising in matrimonial and real estate law.

== Personal life ==
In February 1979, Brownstein's son, aged 16, died in a fire while staying with friends over the weekend in Salisbury, Vermont.

He died on March 24, 1996, while on a family visit in Miami Beach, Florida, of a heart attack.

== Sources ==
New York State Assembly
Preceded by Bernard Haber	New York State Assembly; Kings County, 16th District; 1960–1963	Succeeded by Salvatore J. Grieco
New York State Senate
Preceded by Frank J. Pino	New York State Senate; 15th District; 1964–1965	Succeeded by Martin J. Knorr
Preceded by Joseph Zaretzki	New York State Senate; 23rd District; 1966	Succeeded by John J. Marchi
