= Carmine J. Marasco =

American lawyer and politician (1891–1960)

Carmine J. Marasco (April 26, 1891 – July 2, 1960) was an American lawyer and politician from New York.

== Life ==
He was born on April 26, 1891, in New York City.

Marasco was a member of the New York State Assembly (New York Co., 3rd D.) in 1915. The same year he graduated from Fordham Law School, and then practiced law in New York City.

He was again a member of the State Assembly (Kings Co., 16th D.) in 1935, 1936 and 1937. In November 1937, he ran for re-election, but was defeated by American Laborite Salvatore T. DeMatteo.

Marasco was again a member of the State Assembly in 1939–40 and 1941. He resigned his seat on January 14, 1941, to run for the State Senate seat vacated by the appointment of Philip M. Kleinfeld to the New York Supreme Court.

Marasco was elected on February 18, 1941, to the New York State Senate (4th D.), was re-elected in 1942, and remained in the Senate until 1944, sitting in the 163rd and 164th New York State Legislatures.

He was a Judge of the Kings County Court from 1945 until his death in 1960.

He died on July 2, 1960, in Bay Ridge Hospital in Brooklyn.

== Sources ==
New York State Assembly
Preceded by John B. Golden	New York State Assembly; New York County, 3rd District; 1915	Succeeded by Caesar B. F. Barra
Preceded by Rudolph Bauer	New York State Assembly; Kings County, 16th District; 1935–1937	Succeeded by Salvatore T. DeMatteo
Preceded by Salvatore T. DeMatteo	New York State Assembly; Kings County, 16th District; 1939–1941	Succeeded by Louis L. Friedman
New York State Senate
Preceded by Philip M. Kleinfeld	New York State Senate; 4th District; 1941–1944	Succeeded by Seymour Halpern
