= Ernest Greenwood (politician) =

American politician

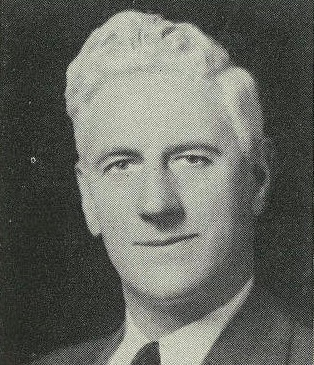

Member of the U.S. House of Representatives from New York's 1st district
- In office January 3, 1951 – January 3, 1953
- Preceded by: W. Kingsland Macy
- Succeeded by: Stuyvesant Wainwright

Personal details
- Born: Ernest Greenwood; November 25, 1884 Barnsley, Yorkshire, England
- Died: June 15, 1955 (aged 70) Bay Shore, New York, US
- Resting place: Oakwood Cemetery, Bay Shore, New York
- Party: Democratic
- Education: City College of New York; Columbia University
- Profession: Educator

Ernest Greenwood (November 25, 1884 – June 15, 1955) was an American schoolteacher and principal. He is most notable for his one term of service as a United States representative from New York from 1951 to 1953.

== Early life ==
Greenwood was born in Barnsley, Yorkshire, England on November 25, 1884. He attended the public schools of Halifax and the Evening Technical Institute and College, and was employed with engineering firms in Sheffield from 1905 to 1906 and Halifax from 1907 to 1910.

== Education career ==
He immigrated to the United States in 1910 and worked for the General Electric Co. in Schenectady from 1910 to 1914. Deciding on a career in education, Greenwood attended City College of New York and Columbia University, and then taught in the Schenectady public schools from 1914 to 1916. He later relocated to Islip, and he taught at Islip High School from 1916 to 1920.

During World War I, Greenwood was a member of committee on Census and Inventory of Military Resources and from 1920 to 1922 he was supervisor of the Federal Board of Vocational Education. He was associate headmaster of the Dwight School for Boys and New York Preparatory School for Adults from 1922 to 1927, and headmaster from 1927 to 1946. He served as chairman of the board of trustees from 1946 until his death. During World War II, Greenwood served on Islip's Rationing Board. From 1947 to 1948, he was chairman of the planning commission for the Bay Shore Board of Education, and he was the board's treasurer from 1947 to 1950. In 1949, he was an unsuccessful Republican candidate for the Suffolk County Board of Supervisors.

== Congressman ==
In 1950, Greenwood was elected to the Eighty-second Congress as a Democrat, defeating Republican incumbent W. Kingsland Macy. He served in the House from January 3, 1951 to January 3, 1953, and was an unsuccessful candidate for reelection in 1952. He ran unsuccessfully in 1954, after which he lived in retirement.

== Death and burial ==
Greenwood died in Bay Shore on June 15, 1955. He was buried at Oakwood Cemetery in Bay Shore.

U.S. House of Representatives
Preceded by W. Kingsland Macy	Member of the U.S. House of Representatives from New York's 1st congressional district 1951–1953	Succeeded by Stuyvesant Wainwright
