= Harry Kemp Morton =

New York politician

Harry Kemp Morton (October 14, 1905 – June 9, 1994) was an American lawyer and politician from New York.

== Life ==
He was born on October 14, 1905, in Hornell, Steuben County, New York, the son of Harry Laverne Morton and May (Kemp) Morton. He attended the public schools, and graduated from the University of Buffalo Law School in 1926. He was admitted to the bar in 1927, and practiced law in Hornell. He was District Attorney of Steuben County from 1945 to 1952.

Morton was a member of the New York State Senate from 1953 to 1958, sitting in the 169th, 170th and 171st New York State Legislatures. In 1958, Morton was challenged by Harold A. Jerry, Jr. in the Republican primary for re-nomination, but the result was disputed. Morton's claim to the nomination was upheld by the Appellate Division, but overturned by the New York Court of Appeals.

He died on June 9, 1994; and was buried at the Townline Cemetery in Rathbone.

== Sources ==
New York State Senate
Preceded by Fred S. Hollowell	New York State Senate; 48th District; 1953–1954	Succeeded by George R. Metcalf
Preceded by Austin W. Erwin	New York State Senate; 48th District; 1955–1958	Succeeded by Harold A. Jerry, Jr.
