= Louis L. Friedman =

American lawyer and politician (1906–1997)

Louis L. Friedman (December 29, 1906 – December 12, 1997) was an American lawyer and politician from New York.

== Life ==
He was born on December 29, 1906, in New York City. He attended the public schools and Commercial High School. He was Jewish.

On February 18, 1941, Friedman was elected to the New York State Assembly (Kings Co., 16th D.), to fill the vacancy caused by the resignation of Carmine J. Marasco. He was re-elected in 1942, and remained in the Assembly until the end of 1944, sitting in the 163rd and 164th New York State Legislatures.

He was a member of the New York State Senate (15th D.) from 1945 to 1955, sitting in the 165th, 166th, 167th, 168th, 169th and 170th New York State Legislatures. In 1953, he married actress Beth Holland, and they had two daughters: Ellen Lynn (Friedman) Silverman and Cathy Jayne Friedman. He resigned his seat on October 5, 1955, and was appointed to one of the trial divisions of the New York Supreme Court level of non-appellate trial courts, to fill a vacancy. In November 1956, he was elected to succeed himself.

On July 2, 1962, Friedman was accused of obstructing an inquiry into ambulance chasing in Brooklyn. He admitted having destroyed some records of the inquiry. On August 17, he was charged by the Court on the Judiciary with unethical conduct, and his trial was set for October 19. On October 6, he denied having done anything unethical, and questioned the constitutionality of the State's proceedings against him. On February 26, 1963, Friedman was removed from the bench by the Court on the Judiciary.

On July 12, 1963, Friedman filed a suit against the City of New York for back pay. In October, his claim was rejected. On January 23, 1968, the New York Supreme Court, Appellate Division allowed Friedman to proceed with his suit for back-pay since his removal.

He died on December 12, 1997. In 2006, his widow Beth Holland married Richard Joseph Kuh (c.1931–2011).

New York State Assembly
Preceded by Carmine J. Marasco	New York State Assembly; Kings County, 16th District; 1941–1944	Succeeded by Frank J. Pino
New York State Senate
Preceded by Lester Baum	New York State Senate; 15th District; 1945–1955	Succeeded by Frank J. Pino
