= Frank J. Pino =

American lawyer and politician (1909–2007)

Frank J. Pino (June 5, 1909 – November 10, 2007) was an American lawyer and politician from New York.

== Life ==
He was born on June 5, 1909, in Brooklyn, New York City, to Joseph Pino and Angela (Merlino) Pino. He attended Public School No. 80, and graduated from Erasmus Hall High School. He went on to graduate from St. John's University School of Law, and practice law in Brooklyn. In 1938, he married Concetta LoRe, and they had three daughters.

Pino was a member of the New York State Assembly from 1945 to 1955, sitting in the 165th, 166th, 167th, 168th, 169th and 170th New York State Legislatures. He resigned his seat on October 6, 1955, to run for the State Senate seat vacated by the appointment of Louis L. Friedman to the New York Supreme Court.

Pino was a member of the New York State Senate from 1956 to 1963, sitting in the 170th, 171st, 172nd, 173rd and 174th New York State Legislatures. In November 1963, he was elected to the New York Supreme Court.

He was a Justice of the Supreme Court from 1964 to 1979, and a Senior Justice from 1980 to 1981. In 1975, St. John's University conferred an honorary degree of LL.D. on him.

In 1989, he moved to Rossmoor, Middlesex County, New Jersey, and died there on November 10, 2007. He was buried at the Holy Cross Burial Park Mausoleum in South Brunswick.

== Sources ==
New York State Assembly
Preceded by Louis L. Friedman	New York State Assembly; Kings County, 16th District; 1945–1955	Succeeded by Bernard Haber
New York State Senate
Preceded by Louis L. Friedman	New York State Senate; 15th District; 1956–1963	Succeeded by Irwin Brownstein
