= Charles O. Burney Jr. =

American lawyer and politician

Charles Orson Burney Jr. (May 28, 1907 – October 1972) was an American lawyer and politician from New York.

== Life ==
He was born on May 28, 1907, in Buffalo, New York, the son of Charles O. Burney. He attended the University of Buffalo.

In May 1935, he married Helen B. Clode. He was Village Attorney of Williamsville.

Burney Jr was a member of the New York State Assembly (Erie Co., 7th D..) in 1937, 1938 and 1939–1940.

He was a member of the New York State Senate from 1941 to 1948, sitting in the 163rd, 164th, 165th and 166th New York State Legislatures. He was a delegate to the 1944 Republican National Convention. In 1948, he ran for re-election, but was defeated by Democrat Benjamin Miller.

Burney died in October 1972.

== Sources ==
New York State Assembly
Preceded by Arthur L. Swartz	New York State Assembly; Erie County, 7th District; 1937–1940	Succeeded by Justin C. Morgan
New York State Senate
Preceded by Arthur L. Swartz	New York State Senate; 50th District; 1941–1944	Succeeded by Rodney B. Janes
Preceded by new district	New York State Senate; 55th District; 1945–1948	Succeeded by Benjamin Miller
