= Department of the Lakes =

The Department of the Lakes was a military department of the United States Army that existed from 1866 to 1873 and again from 1898 to 1913. It was subordinate to the Military Division of the Atlantic and comprised posts in the Midwestern United States as the successor to the Northern Department and the Department of the Ohio.

== Commanders ==
=== First creation ===
- Bvt. Major General Joseph Hooker, August 23, 1866, to June 1, 1867
- Brigadier General John Pope, January 13, 1868, to April 30, 1870
- Bvt. Major General Philip St. George Cooke May 6, 1870, to Oct. 29, 1873

=== Second creation ===
- Brigadier General Joseph Wheeler, June 18 to Sept. 10, 1900.
- Brigadier General Elwell Stephen Otis, October 29, 1900 to March 25, 1902.
- Brigadier General Frederick Dent Grant, January 15, 1904 to September 28, 1904.
- Major General Frederick Dent Grant, November 12, 1908, to July 23, 1910.
- Major General Charles L. Hodges, July 24, 1910 to March 13, 1911.
- Brigadier General Ralph Wilson Hoyt, 1911.
