= John Fleming (New York judge) =

American judge

John Fleming (June 1, 1842 – April 19, 1918) was an Irish-American lawyer and judge.

== Life ==
Fleming was born on June 1, 1842, in County Monaghan, Ireland, the son of William Fleming and Mary O'Neill. His parents died when he was five, after which he was raised and educated by his maternal uncle James O'Neill.

In 1856, he immigrated to America and settled in Jamaica, Queens, New York, with his four sisters. He attended public school for two years, after which he became a clerk for Watson & Mears. He briefly attended Rev. Matthew Hunting's private school. At the encouragement of Judge Armstrong, he began to study law in the office of Armstrong & Fosdick until the American Civil War interrupted his studies.

In August 1862, Fleming enlisted as a private in Company A. of the 165th New York Infantry Regiment. In September 1862, he was promoted to corporal. In November 1862, he was promoted to sergeant. In November 1863, he was promoted to first sergeant. He was honorably discharged in September 1865. He participated in movements along the James River and was in the Battles of Cedar Creek, Winchester, Plains Store, Ponchatoula, Sabine Cross Roads, Pleasant Hill, Cane River, Mausura Plains, and Port Hudson. He responded to General Banks' call for volunteers for the last assault on Port Hudson.

After the war, Fleming returned to studying law with Armstrong & Fosdick and was admitted to the bar in 1866. He continued working in the same office until 1870, when he made a visit to Ireland. Upon his return, he opened his own law office and started a general law practice. He served as village trustee for six years. In 1883, after Governor Grover Cleveland removed District Attorney Benjamin W. Downing for bribery, the governor appointed him Queens County District Attorney. A few days later, the Democratic Party nominated him as their candidate for the office and he won the election against Republican William J. Youngs. As district attorney, he prosecuted a large number of murder trials. After his first term, the Democratic Party gave their nomination to Thomas F. McGowan. McGowan won the election, but a few months later it was revealed that as town supervisor he was defaulter of $40,000, and he fled. The District Attorney position now vacant, Judge Bartlett of the court of oyer and toyer appointed Fleming to handle the criminal business of the term. Governor Hill officially appointed him as District Attorney in August 1887, and he was elected to the office in 1887 and re-election in 1890. During this term, he fought against pool selling and gambling in Long Island City and had Mayor Gleason arrested for an assault. In response, Gleason used his influence to ensure Fleming's defeat in the 1893 election. He also prosecuted officers of the Western Union Telegraph Company for permitting its wires to be used for illegal enterprises. In 1896, he unsuccessfully ran as the Democratic candidate for the New York Supreme Court.

In 1898, Mayor Van Wyck appointed Fleming Justice of Special Sessions for the Second District. He served as Justice until December 31, 1915, when he retired as Justice after 17 years on the bench.

Fleming was an executive member of the Society of the 19th Army Corps as well as commander and charter member of the local Grand Army of the Republic post. He was also a founder of the Jamaica Club, a prime mover in preserving King Manor, and president of the St. Patrick's Society of Queens. He was a member of the Roman Catholic Church.

Fleming died at home from pneumonia on April 19, 1918.

Legal offices
Preceded by Benjamin W. Downing	Queens County District Attorney; 1883–1886	Succeeded by Thomas F. McGowan
Preceded by Thomas F. McGowan	Queens County District Attorney; 1887–1893	Succeeded by Daniel Noble
