= Onderdonk =

Onderdonk is a surname. Notable people with the surname include:

- Andrew Onderdonk (1848–1905), construction contractor
- Benjamin T. Onderdonk (1791–1861), bishop of the Episcopal Diocese of New York
- Henry Onderdonk (1789–1858), second Episcopal bishop of Pennsylvania
- Julian Onderdonk (1882–1922), American Impressionist painter
- Robert Jenkins Onderdonk (1852–1917), American painter and art teacher
- Virginia Onderdonk (1908–1994), American philosopher and college dean
- William H. Onderdonk (1820–1882), American lawyer
