= James Hallinan =

James Hallinan may refer to:

- Jimmy Hallinan, Irish-American baseball player
- James T. Hallinan, American lawyer and judge from New York
