= Robert Tripp Ross =

American politician

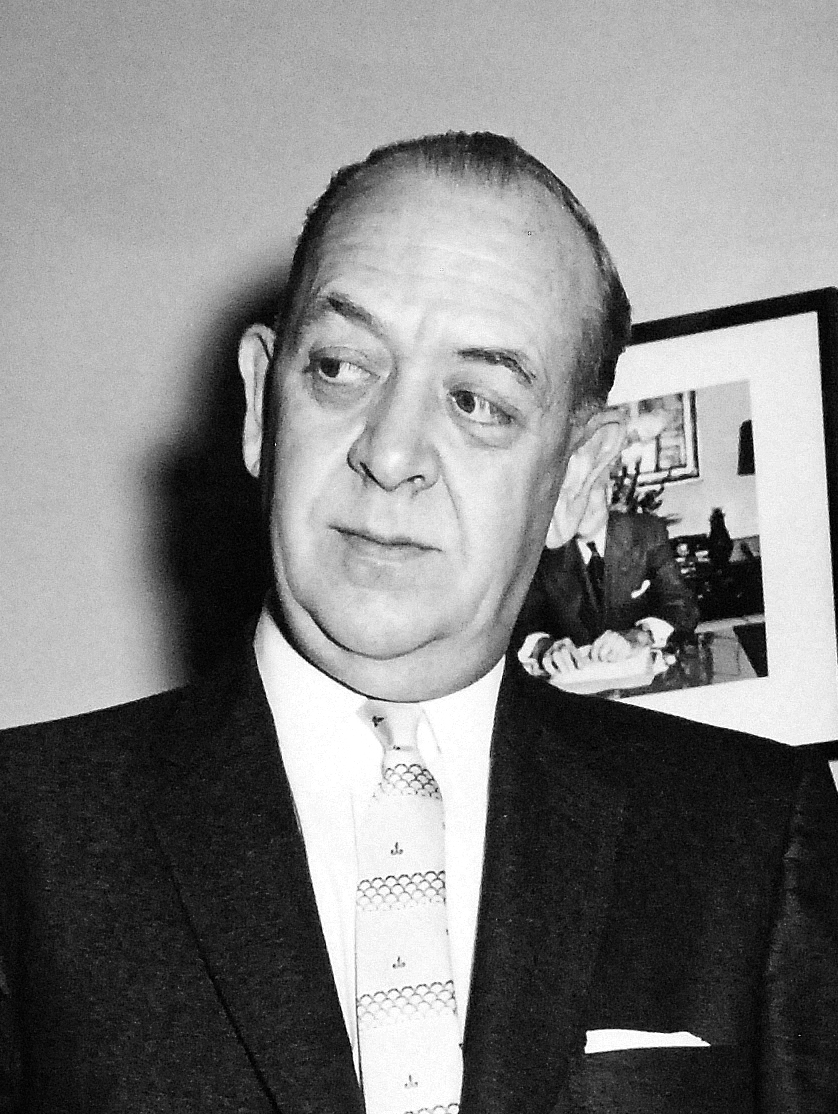
- Robert Tripp Ross in 1955

Member of the U.S. House of Representatives from New York's 5th district
- In office January 3, 1947 – January 3, 1949
- Preceded by: James A. Roe
- Succeeded by: T. Vincent Quinn
- In office February 19, 1952 – January 3, 1953
- Preceded by: T. Vincent Quinn
- Succeeded by: Albert H. Bosch

Personal details
- Born: June 4, 1903 Washington, North Carolina, U.S.
- Died: October 1, 1981 (aged 78) Jackson Heights, New York City, New York, U.S.
- Party: Republican Party

Robert Tripp Ross (June 4, 1903 – October 1, 1981) was an American politician from New York. He served in two non-consecutive terms to the United States House of Representatives and an assistant secretary of defense.

== Early life ==
Ross was born in Washington, Beaufort County, North Carolina and attended the public schools there, subsequently attending Northeastern University. Later, he tried several professions including real estate investment in Florida, advertising sales in Florida and Texas, and auto sales in North Carolina. He moved to New York City in 1929, and engaged as a druggist. He took a job at a pharmacy in Queens where he became the manager. By 1946, he was an assistant to the president of a drug company.

== Political career ==
In 1946, Ross ran for a seat in Congress from New York's 5th congressional district. Previously a Democratic district, Ross won election as one of 55 Republicans who swept to victory in the 1946 elections. His time in Congress was short, as he was defeated by T. Vincent Quinn in the 1948 elections and again in 1950. From 1949 until 1952, he was a director of sales and marketing for the Southern Athletic Company, which was owned by his brother-in-law.

At the end of 1951, Quinn resigned his seat in Congress to become the Queens County District Attorney and Ross won the February 1952 special election to replace him. Ross was defeated in the general election in 1952 by Lester Holtzman.

=== Defense Department ===
After his defeat, Ross became the Washington liaison for the New York Republican State Committee. Later, he worked for Assistant Secretary of Defense for Legislative Affairs, Fred A. Seaton. When Seaton left to work as an assistant to President Dwight Eisenhower in 1955, Ross was appointed to Seaton’s position.

Ross’ initial months in the post were tumultuous. Ross was directed by Secretary of Defense, Charles E. Wilson to ensure that all releases made a “constructive contribution” to national defense. Congressional committees and reporters charged him with censorship when he made significant edits to speeches by staffers, service secretaries and the Joint Chiefs of Staff. A congressional subcommittee found that the Department of Defense’s policies were the most restrictive of any agency.

He also incorrectly confirmed a 1956 report that three senators, including John L. McClellan, had requested the Air Force to send a pair of planes to Europe for them. The Defense department ultimately apologized to the senators for the slip-up.

In January 1957, Ross took a leave of absence in response to a congressional investigation into possible conflicts of interest involving a clothing business run by his wife and owned by his brother-in-law. The subcommittee, headed by Senator McClellan, looked into an $835,150 contract for Army trousers that was awarded to Wynn Enterprises. The Senators also looked into an allegation that Ross set up a meeting for his brother-in-law with an army officer to ostensibly discuss clothes procured under another defense contract. The committee also looked into information that Ross was still affiliated with the company, despite assurances that he severed all ties.

Ross denied all the allegations and an investigation by the Defense Department found no violations of the law and no improper use of influence. Nevertheless, Ross concluded that the charges would affect his ability to serve and resigned in February 1957.

== Later career ==
After leaving the Defense Department, he worked as an assistant borough works commissioner in Queens, New York from March 1957 to January 1958, and then as vice president of the Merchandising Apparel Company from 1959 to 1968.

== Personal life ==
Ross married twice. He had two sons, Robert, Jr. and Ford, from his first marriage, which ended in divorce. His second wife was Claire (Wynn) Ross. He resided in Jackson Heights until his death there on October 1, 1981; interment was at Oakdale Cemetery in Washington, North Carolina.

U.S. House of Representatives
| Preceded by James A. Roe | Member of the U.S. House of Representatives from New York's 5th congressional district 1947–1949 | Succeeded by T. Vincent Quinn |
| Preceded by T. Vincent Quinn | Member of the U.S. House of Representatives from New York's 5th congressional district 1952–1953 | Succeeded by Albert H. Bosch |
