= Charles P. Sullivan =

American politician

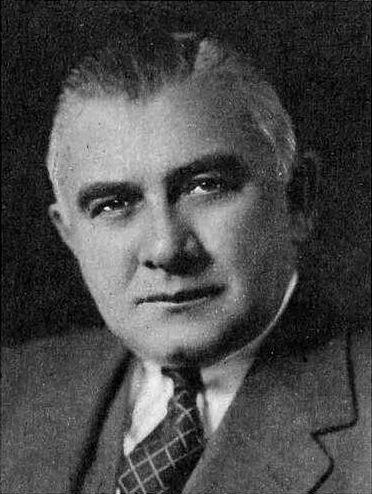
Sullivan c. 1951

Charles P. Sullivan (February 3, 1886 – July 18, 1956) was an American lawyer and politician from New York.

== Life ==
Sullivan was born on February 3, 1886, in Louisville, New York, the son of Jeremiah and Mary Sullivan. His father was a farmer.

Sullivan graduated from the Potsdam Normal School, after which he worked as a teacher for three years. He then went to New York City and attended the New York Law School. He was admitted to the bar in 1913, after which he began practicing in New York City. Nine years later, he moved to Flushing, Queens and practiced law there.

In 1922, Sullivan was elected to the New York State Assembly as a Democrat, representing the Queens County 4th District. He served in the Assembly in 1923. A year later, he was named counsel to the Queens County Clerk. In 1925, he was appointed a deputy assistant district attorney. Five years later, he became chief assistant prosecutor.

In 1935, after District Attorney Charles S. Colden was appointed to the County Court, Governor Herbert H. Lehman appointed Sullivan Queens County District Attorney. He was then and elected and re-elected to the position several times. In 1936, a newspaper accused him of laxity in prosecuting a homicidal case, although Governor Lehman refused to supersede Sullivan as the paper demanded and he was re-elected to office in 1938. In the first six months of 1938, he led the city in percentage of felony convictions, with 88.32%. He was especially active in prosecuting gamblers in his later years. In 1951, he fell out of favor with James A. Roe, the leader of the Queens Democratic Party, and after failing to get the Democratic nomination for County Judge he formed an alliance with Rudolph Halley and unsuccessfully ran for re-election on the Liberal and independent ticket.

Sullivan attended St. Andrew's Roman Catholic Church of Flushing. He was a member of the Knights of Columbus and the Fraternal Order of Eagles. In 1918, he married Catherine O'Sullivan. Their children were Charles J., Honoria, and Lawrence.

Sullivan died in Flushing Hospital on July 18, 1956. He was buried in Mount Saint Mary Cemetery in Flushing.

New York State Assembly
Preceded by Joseph H. S. Thomas	New York State Assembly; Queens County, 4th District; 1923	Succeeded by D. Lacy Dayton
Legal offices
Preceded by Charles S. Colden	Queens County District Attorney; 1935–1951	Succeeded by T. Vincent Quinn
