= Nat H. Hentel =

Nat Herbert Hentel (born March 29, 1919, The Bronx; died Jan. 31, 2007 Tucson, Arizona) was a New York Supreme Court justice and an interim Queens County District Attorney, appointed by Governor Nelson Rockefeller.

== Biography ==
Hentel is a 1939 graduate of the City College of New York. His service in the Pacific as a member of the United States Army interrupted his studies at the New York University School of Law for five years but he returned and graduated in 1946.

In January 2007, Diana Klebanow, his wife, announced he died at home due to Parkinson's Disease. They had been married for 64 years and he was also survived by two daughters, four grandchildren and three great-grandchildren.

== Career ==
Hentel was appointed District Attorney in January 1966 replacing Frank D. O'Connor who was elected the President of the New York City Council. The following November, the Republican candidate lost to Democrat Thomas J. Mackell by more than 71,000 votes. To improve his chances at the polls in November, he decided he would try to “rid the city of top hoodlums” and in September 1966, ordered the 13 mafiosi arrested at La Stella Restaurant. none were indicted but each was held on $100,000 bail as material witnesses in a grand jury investigation that yielded no indictments.

Mayor John Lindsay appointed him a Civil Court judge in 1969, where he served until 1987. That was when he was elected to the Supreme Court, as a Democrat. He retired in 1992.

Legal offices
| Preceded by Frank D. O'Connor | District Attorney of Queens County; 1966 | Succeeded by Michael F. Armstrong |
