= Charles Colden =

Charles Colden may refer to:

- Charles J. Colden (1870–1938), U.S. representative from California
- Charles S. Colden (1885–1960), American lawyer and judge from New York
