= Daniel Noble (New York judge) =

American judge

- Born: December 25, 1859; Brooklyn, New York, U.S.
- Died: May 30, 1937 (aged 77); Brentwood, New York, U.S.
- Education: Columbia College, Columbia Law School
- Occupations: Lawyer, Judge
- Political party: Democratic
- Spouse: Annie F. Moran (m. 1888)
- Parent(s): Solomon B. Noble, Agnes Nicolson
- Relatives: Daniel Noble (great-grandfather)

Daniel Noble (December 25, 1859 – May 30, 1937) was an American lawyer and judge from New York.

== Life ==
Noble was born on December 25, 1859, in Brooklyn, New York, the son of Solomon B. Noble, a lawyer and member of the New York State Assembly, and Agnes Nicolson. His great-grandfather Daniel Noble was a Justice on the Massachusetts Supreme Court.

Noble attended private schools in Brooklyn until 1870, when he and two brothers went to study in Germany until 1876. When he returned to America, he entered Columbia College. This was followed by Columbia Law School, from which he graduated in 1881 with a Bachelor of Laws. He then formed a practice with his father in Long Island City called S. B. & D. Noble. After his father died in 1895, he practiced law alone.

In 1892, Noble was elected justice of the peace of Long Island City with the help of Patrick Gleason. A year, later, Gleason's faction elected him Queens County District Attorney. He later came to oppose Gleason. A Democrat, he lost re-election to Republican William J. Youngs in 1896. In 1898, he was elected Surrogate of Queens County. He was repeatedly re-elected to the post and served until 1929, when he retired due to the age limit. He then served as official referee of the Court. Following his retirement, he moved to and practiced law in Jamaica, Queens.

Noble attended the Episcopal Church. He was librarian of the Queens County Bar Association and a member of the Freemasons. In 1888, he married Annie F. Moran.

Noble died at his summer home in Brentwood on May 30, 1937. He was buried in Mount Olivet Cemetery in Maspeth.

Legal offices
Preceded by John Fleming	Queens County District Attorney; 1894–1896	Succeeded by William J. Youngs
