= Laura Bornholdt =

American historian and academic administrator

Laura Anna Bornholdt
- Born: February 11, 1919; Peoria, Illinois, U.S.
- Died: April 16, 2012 (aged 93); Bloomington, Indiana, U.S.
- Occupations: Historian, college administrator

Laura Anna Bornholdt (February 11, 1919 – April 16, 2012) was an American historian and academic administrator. She served as a dean or trustee at several prominent colleges and universities and an official at three non-profit organizations pursuing progress in higher education.

== Early life and education ==
Bornholdt was born in Peoria, Illinois. She earned her bachelor's degree from Smith College in 1940 and her PhD in history from Yale University in 1945. Her dissertation was revised and published as a monograph, Baltimore and Early Pan-Americanism: a Study in the Background of the Monroe Doctrine. The book was well-received, described as "well-balanced and judicious."

== Career ==
Bornholdt returned to Smith as a faculty member in 1945, and taught there until 1952, when she took a position as Higher Education Associate in International Relations at the American Association of University Women. In 1957 she returned to academia as Dean of Sarah Lawrence College, the first of a rapid series of administrative appointments: she was named Dean of Women at the University of Pennsylvania in 1959 and Dean of Wellesley College the following year. She remained at Wellesley until 1964, when she was replaced by Virginia Onderdonk. Following her departure, she worked for the Danforth Foundation and the Lilly Endowment, at both of the which she was the first woman vice president, and pushed both charities to do more to empower women. She was appointed to the board of trustees of the College of Wooster in 1977. She later served as special assistant to the president of the University of Chicago.

As an administrator, Bornholdt was a proponent of creating opportunities for women as well as people of color; at Wellesley, she insisted on the need for a flexible and inclusive model, drawing on her experience as a consultant to universities in Ghana and Tunisia. Her long career in academia gave her a distinctive perspective on the changing condition of women at American universities. In 1979, she recalled about her time at Yale in the '40s, "There was never the slightest sense of intellectual condescension at Yale. Apart from the classroom and library, however, we women were second-class citizens. The gyms were closed, Mory's ale house, college commons. Not one member of the liberal arts faculty was a woman. There was not a single administrator. There was not a single role model for hundreds of miles around for what we wanted to do with our degrees." When, in a 1987 editorial in Change, she described the efforts to diversify higher education of the 1960s and 1970s as having "fizzled," she wrote from experience. In a 1993 review for the same journal, she wrote of the need to recognize "why the old leadership we all grew up with can't lead us anymore, and why women and minority members will take their rightful place among the new leaders—or else."
