= Thomas A. Duffy =

American lawyer and politician

Member of the New York State Senate from the 8th district
- In office January 1, 1957 – December 31, 1965
- Preceded by: Bernard Tompkins
- Succeeded by: John D. Caemmerer

Member of the New York State Assembly from the Queens County's 4th district
- In office January 1, 1949 – December 31, 1956
- Preceded by: George T. Clark
- Succeeded by: Frank R. McGlynn, Jr.

Personal details
- Born: April 6, 1906 Brooklyn, New York
- Died: April 11, 1979 (aged 73) Bronx, New York
- Party: Democratic

Thomas A. Duffy (April 6, 1906 – April 11, 1979) was an American lawyer and politician from New York.

== Life ==
He was born on April 6, 1906, in Brooklyn, New York City. The family moved to Astoria, Queens, when Thomas was still a child. He graduated from Regis High School in 1926. In 1938, he married Helen M. Fisher (born 1908), and they had three children. The couple lived in Jackson Heights, Queens.

Duffy was a member of the New York State Assembly (Queens Co., 4th D.) from 1949 to 1956, sitting in the 167th, 168th, 169th and 170th New York State Legislatures. On February 7, 1956, he ran in a special election for the State Senate seat vacated by the resignation of Frank D. O'Connor, but was defeated by Republican Bernard Tompkins. In November 1956, Duffy defeated Tompkins who ran for re-election.

Duffy was a member of the New York State Senate (8th D.) from 1957 to 1965, sitting in the 171st, 172nd, 173rd, 174th and 175th New York State Legislatures.

He was a justice of the New York City Civil Court from 1967 to 1976.

He died on April 11, 1979, in Calvary Hospital in the Bronx.

== Sources ==
New York State Assembly
| Preceded by George T. Clark | New York State Assembly; Queens County, 4th District; 1949–1956 | Succeeded by Frank R. McGlynn, Jr. |
New York State Senate
| Preceded by Bernard Tompkins | New York State Senate; 8th District; 1957–1965 | Succeeded by John D. Caemmerer |
