= Samuel Youngs (New York politician) =

New York politician

Member of the New York State Assembly from Queens County
- In office 1843–1844
- Preceded by: John W. Lawrence
- Succeeded by: Elbert Floyd-Jones

Personal details
- Born: c. 1813 Queens, New York, U.S.
- Died: after 1863
- Resting place: Youngs Memorial Cemetery, Oyster Bay, New York
- Occupation: Politician

Samuel Youngs (born c. 1813 – after 1863) was an American politician from New York. He served as a member of the New York State Assembly in 1843 and 1844, representing Queens County.

== Early life ==
Youngs was born about 1813 in Queens, New York. He was the grandson of Samuel Youngs (1753–1797), who had also served in the New York State Assembly in 1794.

== Political career ==
Youngs was elected to the New York State Assembly and served in 1843 and 1844, representing Queens County. He succeeded John W. Lawrence and was succeeded by Elbert Floyd-Jones.

== Later life ==
After his time in the Assembly, Youngs moved westward. He became a member of the city council of Sacramento, California, and later a member of the Nevada Territorial Legislature in 1862. He was a delegate to the Nevada state constitutional convention in 1863, and served as an Esmeralda County Commissioner.

His burial location is unknown, but he is interred at Youngs Memorial Cemetery in Oyster Bay, Long Island.

New York State Assembly
Preceded by John W. Lawrence	New York State Assembly; Queens County; 1843–1844	Succeeded by Elbert Floyd-Jones
