= Albert H. Bosch =

American politician

Albert Henry Bosch
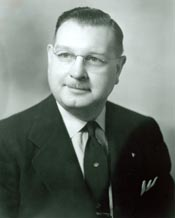

Member of the U.S. House of Representatives from New York's 5th district
- In office January 3, 1953 – December 31, 1960
- Preceded by: Robert Tripp Ross
- Succeeded by: Joseph P. Addabbo

Personal details
- Born: October 30, 1908 New York City, U.S.
- Died: November 21, 2005 (aged 97) Amityville, New York, U.S.
- Party: Republican Party
- Spouse: Theresa Hoenig Bosch (1908–1995)
- Education: St. John's University School of Law
- Occupation: Attorney, Politician

Albert Henry Bosch (October 30, 1908 – November 21, 2005) was an American jurist and politician who served as a Republican member of the United States House of Representatives from New York from 1953 to 1960. From 1962 to 1974 he served on the New York Supreme Court.

== Early life and education ==
Bosch was born in New York City the son of Henry and Margaretha (Hamburger) Bosch. He attended the public schools and graduated with an LL.B from St. John's University School of Law in 1933. He married Theresa Hoenig on July 19, 1936, was admitted to the bar in 1938, and commenced the practice of law in New York City.

Bosch was admitted to practice before the Treasury Department and the Supreme Court of the United States, and became trustee of Hamburg Savings Bank, Ridgewood, New York.

== Tenure ==
Elected as a Republican to the Eighty-third Congress in 1952, and reelected to the three succeeding Congresses, Bosch served from January 3, 1953, until his resignation on December 31, 1960. Bosch voted in favor of the Civil Rights Acts of 1957 and 1960.

== Judicial career ==
Bosch was elected judge of Queens County court and served from December 31, 1960, until September 1, 1962. He was elected justice of the New York Supreme Court, eleventh judicial district, and served from 1962 until his retirement on December 31, 1974.

== Retirement and death ==
Bosch lived for nearly 30 years after retiring from the Court. A German-American, he was active in the Steuben Society, including serving as the group's national chairman on two occasions. He also was a member of the Bushwick Club business association, among other service groups to which he belonged.

After living in Jamaica Estates in the early 1970s, he moved with his wife to Whiting, New Jersey in 1976. Following his wife's death in 1995, he moved to Amityville, Suffolk County, Long Island, New York. He died there on November 21, 2005 (age 97 years, 22 days). He is interred at Maple Grove Cemetery.

U.S. House of Representatives
Preceded by Robert Tripp Ross	Member of the U.S. House of Representatives from New York's 5th congressional district January 3, 1953 – December 31, 1960	Succeeded by Joseph P. Addabbo
