= Thomas J. Mackell =

New York lawyer and politician (1914–1992)

District Attorney of Queens County
- In office January 1, 1967 – April 23, 1973
- Preceded by: Nat H. Hentel (interim)
- Succeeded by: Michael F. Armstrong

Member of the New York State Senate
- In office January 1, 1955 – December 31, 1966
- Preceded by: Harry Gittleson
- Succeeded by: Edward S. Lentol
- Constituency: 9th district (1955-1965); 14th district (1966)

Personal details
- Born: July 19, 1914 New York City, US
- Died: January 27, 1992 (aged 77) Douglaston, Queens, New York, U.S.
- Party: Democratic Party
- Children: 1+
- Education: City College of New York; St. John's University School of Law

Thomas J. Mackell (July 19, 1914 – January 27, 1992) was an American lawyer and Democratic politician from New York.

== Life ==
He was born on July 19, 1914, in New York City. He worked as a power maintainer in the subways while attending college and law school. He graduated from the City College of New York in 1938, and from St. John's University School of Law in 1942. The same year he joined the police force and became a detective in 1946. He left the police in 1952, and practiced law instead. He also entered politics as Democrat.

Mackell was a member of the New York State Senate (Ninth District) from 1955 to 1966, sitting in the 170th, 171st, 172nd, 173rd, 174th, 175th and 176th New York State Legislatures. In September 1959, he challenged Borough President of Queens John T. Clancy in the Democratic primary, but was defeated. In September 1961, he ran in the Democratic primary for President of the New York City Council, but was defeated by Paul R. Screvane. At the beginning of the session of 1965, the Democrats had a majority over the Republicans, but were split into two factions: the followers of Mayor Robert F. Wagner Jr. and the followers of U.S. Senator Robert F. Kennedy. During part of the month-long deadlock, Mackell received the 14 votes of the Wagner men for Temporary President, but was eventually replaced with Joseph Zaretzki.

He was District Attorney of Queens County from 1967 to 1973.

=== Ponzi scheme ===
On August 1, 1972, Mackell announced that nine of his assistant D.A.s, among them his son-in-law James D. Robertson, were cited in a federal investigation for income tax evasion as having invested money in a Ponzi scheme. In September 1972, Maurice H. Nadjari was appointed as a special prosecutor to probe into corruption in the law enforcement and judicial system of New York City. On October 10, the defence of Joseph Ferdinando, the operator of the Ponzi scheme, asked the Appellate Division to remove Mackell from the case, because his assistants were involved in it. On October 22, it became known that, when the first complaint against the Ponzi scheme operator had been made, Mackell assigned his son-in-law to the case, knowing that he had invested in the scheme. The case dragged on for months, Mackell himself testified before the grand jury and on February 26, 1973, Mackell transferred the case to the Nassau County D.A.

Nevertheless, Nadjari continued his inquiry into Mackell's office for some months until the special grand jury indicted Mackell for several misdemeanors, and he was arrested on April 12. On April 23, Mackell resigned as district attorney. His trial began on January 14, 1974, and ended on March 2 with his conviction for conspiracy, hindering prosecution and official misconduct. On April 23, he was sentenced to six months in jail. On March 28, 1975, the New York Supreme Court, Appellate Division overturned the conviction and dismissed all charges, for lack of evidence, saying that "Nadjari was guilty of constant and patent disregard of the basic rules of evidence". Nadjari tried to have the Appellate Division overruled by the New York Court of Appeals, but on June 10, the latter upheld the Appellate decision. Afterwards Mackell resumed the practice of law.

Mackell died on January 27, 1992, in Douglaston, Queens, of stomach cancer.

== Sources ==
New York State Senate
Preceded by Harry Gittleson	New York State Senate; 9th District; 1955–1965	Succeeded by Murray Schwartz
Preceded by William T. Conklin	New York State Senate; 14th District; 1966	Succeeded by Edward S. Lentol
Legal offices
Preceded by Nat H. Hentel	District Attorney of Queens County; 1967–1973	Succeeded by Michael F. Armstrong
