= Harry Gittleson =

American politician

Harry Gittleson (September 27, 1899 – October 1979) was an American lawyer and politician from New York.

== Life ==
He was born on September 27, 1899, in Halifax, Nova Scotia, Canada. He attended school in Glace Bay, Nova Scotia. He practiced law in New York City.

Gittleson was a member of the New York State Assembly (14th D.) in 1938; and again from 1941 to 1948, sitting in the 163rd, 164th, 165th and 166th New York State Legislatures.

He was a member of the New York State Senate from 1949 to 1962, sitting in the 167th, 168th, 169th, 170th, 171st, 172nd and 174th New York State Legislatures. In November 1962, he was elected to the New York City Civil Court.

He was a judge of the Civil Court from 1963 to 1968; and was Administrative Judge of the Civil Court (i.e. administrative head of the citywide Civil Court system) from 1967 to 1969. In November 1968, he was elected to the New York Supreme Court. He was a justice of the Supreme Court in 1969 (while remaining in office as Administrative Judge of the Civil Court), and—after reaching the constitutional age limit—was an Official Referee (i.e. a senior judge on an additional seat) of the Supreme Court from 1970 to 1975.

In 1977, he was appointed by the court as temporary guardian of serial killer "Son of Sam" David Berkowitz.

He died in October 1979.

== Sources ==
New York State Assembly
Preceded by Rudolph Zimmerman	New York State Assembly; Kings County, 14th District; 1938	Succeeded by Aaron F. Goldstein
Preceded by Aaron F. Goldstein	New York State Assembly; Kings County, 14th District; 1941–1948	Succeeded by Edward S. Lentol
New York State Senate
Preceded by Richard McCleery	New York State Senate; 9th District; 1949–1954	Succeeded by Thomas J. Mackell
Preceded by Joseph R. Marro	New York State Senate; 18th District; 1955–1962	Succeeded by Edward S. Lentol
