= T. Vincent Quinn =

American politician (1903–1982)

Thomas Vincent Quinn
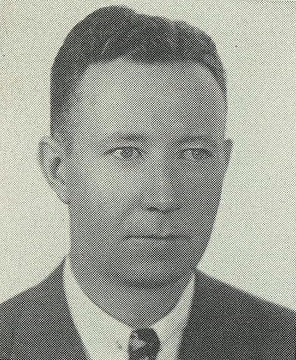

Member of the U.S. House of Representatives from New York's 5th district
- In office January 3, 1949 – December 31, 1951
- Preceded by: Robert Tripp Ross
- Succeeded by: Robert Tripp Ross

Personal details
- Born: March 16, 1903 Long Island City, New York, U.S.
- Died: March 1, 1982 (aged 78) Venice, Florida, U.S.
- Party: Democratic
- Education: Fordham University School of Law
- Occupation: Attorney

Thomas Vincent Quinn (March 16, 1903 – March 1, 1982) was an American jurist and politician from New York. He served as an assistant U.S. attorney general and was elected to one term in the United States House of Representatives. He left Congress to become the Queens County District Attorney and was defeated for re-election after being indicted on Federal corruption charges. He was not convicted and was later appointed as a criminal court judge.

== Early life and career ==
T. Vincent Quinn was born in Long Island City, New York on March 16, 1903. He attended schools in Queens, graduated from William Cullen Bryant High School, and received his LL.B. degree from Fordham University School of Law in 1924.

Quinn practiced in New York City. Active in the Democratic Party, he served as Assistant District Attorney of Queens County from September 1931 to August 1934. From 1934 to 1947 he was an Assistant United States Attorney for the Eastern District of New York, and he twice served as Acting U.S. Attorney.

== Political career ==
In July 1947 Quinn was appointed by President Harry Truman as a United States Assistant Attorney General for the Criminal Division and was confirmed in September. In the post, he worked on the post-war cases of World War II propagandists Iva Toguri D'Aquino, better known as Tokyo Rose and Robert Henry Best.

After 13 months at the Justice Department, Quinn resigned in August 1948 to run for Congress from New York's 5th congressional district. In the 1948 election, Quinn defeated freshman Republican Robert Tripp Ross. He defeated Ross in a rematch in 1950; but ran successfully for Queens County's District Attorney in 1951 and resigned from Congress in December.

== Criminal Charges ==
In 1953, Quinn and his former law partners were indicted for allegedly enabling Quinn to accept legal fees for advising clients with business before the federal government while he was serving in Congress, and taking steps to conceal this activity. Despite the charges and the Queens Democratic Party's refusal to endorse him, he ran for re-election as district attorney in 1955 with former state Senator Frank D. O'Connor challenging him in the Democratic primary. O’Connor prevailed by 1,452 votes after a recount. Quinn and his associates were acquitted on some charges in 1956. The judge ruled that prosecutors had presented no evidence that Quinn was aware the legal fees in question were from cases that took place during his time in Congress. In 1957, the remaining charges were dismissed.

== Later career ==
In 1957, Quinn was appointed to the New York City Magistrates' Court. He served as a magistrate until 1962, when the court was merged with the New York City Criminal Court. After the merger Quinn was a Judge on the criminal court until retiring in September 1972.

== Personal life ==
In retirement Quinn resided in Venice, Florida, where he died on March 1, 1982.

Legal offices
Preceded by Harold M. Kennedy	U.S. Attorney for the Eastern District of New York; Acting; 1944 - 1945	Succeeded by Miles F. McDonald
Preceded by Miles F. McDonald	U.S. Attorney for the Eastern District of New York; Acting; 1945 - 1946	Succeeded by J. Vincent Keogh
Preceded by Charles P. Sullivan	Queens District Attorney; 1952 - 1955	Succeeded by Frank D. O'Connor
U.S. House of Representatives
Preceded by Robert T. Ross	Member of the U.S. House of Representatives from New York's 5th congressional district 1949–1951	Succeeded by Robert T. Ross
