= Bernard Tompkins =

American politician

Bernard Tompkins (February 6, 1904 – February 7, 1965) was an American lawyer and politician from New York.

== Life ==
He was born on February 6, 1904, in New York City. He was an Assistant United States Attorney from 1930 to 1936 and a special assistant to the U.S. Attorney General from 1937 to 1940.

In November 1952, Tompkins defeated the incumbent Democratic Senator Frank D. O'Connor in the 6th senatorial district and was a member of the New York State Senate (6th D.) in 1953 and 1954. He was Chairman of a Joint Legislative Committee on Charitable and Philanthropic Agencies and Organizations (the "Tompkins Committee") which investigated fund-raising practices in New York. The findings of the committee led to the enactment of a law that required registration and reporting by fund-raising organizations and individuals.

In November 1954, after re-apportionment, Tompkins ran in the 8th district for re-election but was defeated by O'Connor. In November 1955, O'Connor was elected D.A. of Queens County, and a special election for the vacant Senate seat was held on February 7, 1956. Tompkins defeated the Democratic nominee Thomas A. Duffy, and was again a member of the State Senate for the remainder of the session of 1956. In November 1956, Tompkins ran for re-election but was defeated by Duffy.

He died on February 7, 1965, while being interviewed by the press on the steps of the NYPD Station House at West 68th Street in Manhattan, of a heart attack; and was buried at the Mount Hebron Cemetery in Flushing, Queens.

== Sources ==
New York State Senate
Preceded by Frank D. O'Connor	New York State Senate; 6th District; 1953–1954	Succeeded by James J. Crisona
Preceded by Frank D. O'Connor	New York State Senate; 8th District; 1956	Succeeded by Thomas A. Duffy
