= John W. Lawrence =

American politician (1800–1888)

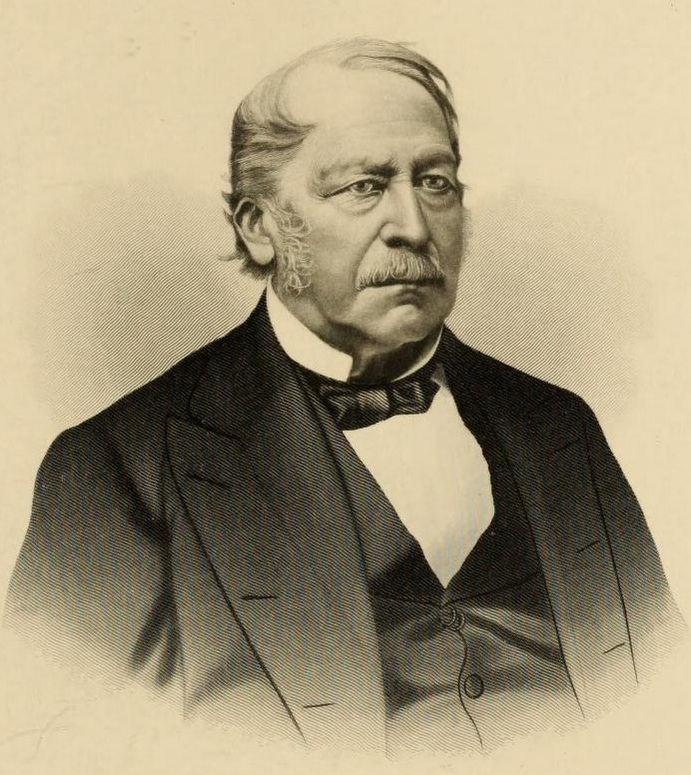

Member of the U.S. House of Representatives from New York's 1st district
- In office March 4, 1845 – March 3, 1847
- Preceded by: Selah B. Strong
- Succeeded by: Frederick William Lord

Member of the New York State Assembly from Queens County
- In office 1841–1842
- Preceded by: John A. King
- Succeeded by: Samuel Youngs

Personal details
- Born: August 19, 1800 Flushing, New York, U.S.
- Died: December 20, 1888 (aged 88) Flushing, New York, U.S.
- Resting place: Flushing Cemetery
- Party: Democratic
- Occupation: Banker, politician

John Watson Lawrence (August 19, 1800 – December 20, 1888) was an American banker and politician who served one term as a U.S. representative from New York from 1845 to 1847.

== Biography ==
Born in Flushing, New York, on August 19, 1800, Lawrence attended the local schools. He engaged as a mercantile clerk. He served as president of the village of Flushing from 1835 to 1845. He was a member of the New York State Assembly (Queens County) in 1841 and 1842. He was extensively interested in banking.

=== Congress ===
Lawrence was elected as a Democrat to the Twenty-ninth Congress (March 4, 1845 – March 3, 1847). He resumed banking pursuits after his term.

He was also a trustee of the village of Flushing from 1860 to 1875.

=== Family ===
He married Mary King Bowne, daughter of Walter Bowne, and had 10 children.

=== Death ===
He died in Flushing, New York on December 20, 1888. He was interred in Flushing Cemetery.

New York State Assembly
Preceded by John A. King	New York State Assembly; Queens County; 1841–1842	Succeeded by Samuel Youngs
U.S. House of Representatives
Preceded by Selah B. Strong	Member of the U.S. House of Representatives from New York's 1st congressional district 1845–1847	Succeeded by Frederick W. Lord
