= Elbert Floyd-Jones =

American politician (1817–1901)

Member of the New York State Assembly from Queens County, 1st District
- In office January 1, 1876 – December 31, 1878
- Preceded by: Townsend D. Cock
- Succeeded by: William J. Youngs

Member of the New York State Assembly from Queens County
- In office January 1, 1845 – December 31, 1845
- Preceded by: Samuel Youngs
- Succeeded by: John Willis

Personal details
- Born: February 7, 1817 South Oyster Bay, New York, U.S.
- Died: February 17, 1901 (aged 84) Park Avenue Hotel, New York City, U.S.
- Resting place: Floyd-Jones Family Cemetery, Massapequa, New York
- Party: Democratic
- Spouse(s): Emily Glentworth (m. 1838; died 1845) Mary Caroline Wingham (m. 1848; died 1867) Martha A. Thorne (m. 1869; died 1870) Elizabeth Morrison Smith (m. 1872)
- Relations: David R. Floyd-Jones (brother); Henry Floyd-Jones (uncle)
- Occupation: Politician, farmer, horse breeder

Elbert Floyd-Jones (February 7, 1817 – February 17, 1901) was an American politician who served in the New York State Assembly in 1845 and again from 1876 to 1878.

== Early life ==
A descendant of an old Long Island family, he was born at the family mansion on the Fort Neck estate in South Oyster Bay, New York (then Queens, now Nassau County). He was the youngest son of Brig.-Gen. Thomas Floyd-Jones (1788–1851) and Cornelia Haring (née Jones) Floyd-Jones (1796–1839). Among his siblings were Lt.-Gov. of New York David R. Floyd-Jones, merchant William Floyd-Jones, and Sarah Maria Floyd-Jones (wife of Coleman Williams).

His paternal grandparents were David Richard Floyd-Jones and Sarah (née Onderdonk) Floyd-Jones and his maternal grandfather was Maj. William Jones. Among his extended family was his uncle, New York State Senator Henry Floyd-Jones, and first cousin, Col. DeLancey Floyd-Jones. He was a descendant of William Floyd, signer of the Declaration of Independence, and Maj. Thomas Jones who owned what is known today as Jones Beach.

Floyd-Jones devoted his early years to "agricultural pursuits and the raising of fine trotting horses."

== Career ==
In 1845, Floyd-Jones served as a Democratic member of the New York State Assembly, representing all of Queens County, which extended from the East River to Suffolk County, during the 68th New York State Legislature. During the U.S. Civil War, Floyd-Jones was an ardent supporter of the Union, and was a "candidate for the Vice Presidency of the United States."

He was again a member of the Assembly in the years 1877 and 1878 in the 100th and 101st New York State Legislatures. By this time, Queens County was split into two districts and he represented District 1. Following the death of Benjamin D. Silliman on January 24, 1901, Floyd-Jones became the oldest living former-member of the Assembly.

== Personal life ==
During his lifetime, Floyd-Jones was married four times. His first marriage was on June 5, 1838 to Emily Glentworth (1815–1845), daughter of Dr. Plunket Fleeson Glentworth and Harriet Straker (née Budden) Glentworth. Together, they were the parents of:

- Cornelia Floyd-Jones (1839–1890), who married Richard Van Wyck Thorne.
- Thomas Floyd-Jones (1841–1919), who married Julia Haines.
- George Floyd-Jones (1842–1927), who married Antoinette Wood, a daughter of Royal and Charlotte (née Kortright) Wood, in 1868.
- Emily Glentworth Floyd-Jones (1845–1923), who married Howard Malcolm Giles in 1869.

His second marriage was on January 25, 1848 to Mary Caroline Wigham (1828–1867), a daughter of Isaac Wigham and Mary (née Seaman) Wigham of New York City. Together, they were the parents of:

- William Floyd-Jones (1851–1857), who died young.
- Mary Wigham Floyd-Jones (1853–1855), who died young.
- Elizabeth Underhill Floyd-Jones (b. 1858)
- Edward Pearsall Floyd-Jones (b. 1860)
- Arthur Floyd-Jones
- Elbert Floyd-Jones (b. 1867).

He married thirdly on October 21, 1869 to Martha A. Thorne (1836–1870), daughter of Mr. Thorne and Sarah (née Townsend) Thorne. Together, they were the parents of:

- Sarah Thorne Floyd-Jones (1870–1870), who died young.

On January 17, 1872, he married for the fourth time to Elizabeth Morrison Smith (1838–1916), daughter of Jeremiah and Emily Smith of New York. He had an estate on his family's property in Massapequa, New York (also known as South Oyster Bay), and for many years, spent his winters at the Park Avenue Hotel in New York City. He was responsible for construction of Old Grace Church in 1844.

Floyd-Jones died at the Park Avenue Hotel in New York City on February 17, 1901. He was buried in the Floyd-Jones family cemetery in Massapequa. After his death, his estate on South Country Road was sold to Senator James H. McCabe. The house was destroyed by fire in 1926 as a result of a Fourth of July fireworks celebration.

New York State Assembly
Preceded by Townsend D. Cock	New York State Assembly; Queens County, 1st District; 1876–1878	Succeeded by William J. Youngs
Preceded by Samuel Youngs	New York State Assembly; Queens County; 1845	Succeeded by John Willis
