= Edward S. Lentol =

American lawyer and politician (1909–1981)

Edward Lentol

Member of the New York State Senate
- In office January 1, 1963 – December 31, 1972
- Preceded by: George Eustis Paine
- Succeeded by: Chester Straub (redistricting)
- Constituency: 18th district (1963-1965); 20th district (1966); 14th district (1967-1972)

Personal details
- Born: December 26, 1909 Brooklyn, New York, U.S.
- Died: December 11, 1981 (aged 71) New York City, New York, U.S.
- Party: Democratic

Edward S. Lentol (December 26, 1909 – December 11, 1981) was an American lawyer and politician from New York.

== Life ==
He was born on December 26, 1909, in Brooklyn, New York City, the son of Assemblyman Joseph Lentol (born 1875). He attended Public School No. 50, Eastern District High School, and St. John's University Pre-Law School. He graduated from St. John's University School of Law. He married Matilda A. Postis (died 1978), and they had three sons.

Lentol was a member of the New York State Assembly (Kings Co., 14th D.) from 1949 to 1962, sitting in the 167th, 168th, 169th, 170th, 171st, 172nd and 173rd New York State Legislatures.

He was a member of the New York State Senate from 1963 to 1972, sitting in the 174th, 175th, 176th, 177th, 178th and 179th New York State Legislatures. In November 1972, he was elected to the New York Supreme Court. After the death of his first wife he married Marie Zaino. He remained on the bench until his death on December 11, 1981, in New York Hospital in Manhattan.

His son Joseph Lentol (born 1943) was formerly a member of the State Assembly, representing the 50th District until 2021.

== Sources ==
New York State Assembly
Preceded by Harry Gittleson	New York State Assembly; Kings County, 14th District; 1949–1962	Succeeded by Edward A. Kurmel
New York State Senate
Preceded by Harry Gittleson	New York State Senate; 18th District; 1963–1965	Succeeded by Simon J. Liebowitz
Preceded by Frederic S. Berman	New York State Senate; 20th District; 1966	Succeeded by Albert B. Lewis
Preceded by Thomas J. Mackell	New York State Senate; 14th District; 1967–1972	Succeeded by Nicholas Ferraro
