= Benjamin W. Downing =

American lawyer (1835–1894)

Queens County District Attorney
- In office 1865–1883

Personal details
- Born: April 1, 1835; Glen Head, New York, USA
- Died: December 2, 1894 (aged 59); Tampa, Florida
- Spouse: Georgina V. Underhill (m. 1858)
- Children: 1
- Education: Poughkeepsie Law School

Benjamin W. Downing (April 1, 1835 – December 2, 1894) was an American lawyer from New York.

== Early life and education ==
Downing was born on April 1, 1835, in Glen Head, New York.

Downing attended the Academy in Macedon, graduating at the top of his class. He worked as a teacher in various Long Island schools for many years. In 1856, while working as principal of the Locust Valley school, he was elected Superintendent of Schools in the Eastern District of Queens County. He was later elected School Commissioner, an office he held for nearly seven years. While working as School Commissioner, he began studying law under Elias J. Beach, the County Judge of Queens County. He then went to Poughkeepsie Law School, graduating there with high honors.

== Career ==
After he was admitted to the bar, Downing began practicing law in Flushing, where he maintained an office until he died. He served as a trustee of the village for several terms, and was at one point, the president of the board. He was also a member of the board of education, serving as its president for twenty years. He was also interested in Flushing real estate.

In 1865, Downing was elected Queens County District Attorney, an office he held for many years. As District Attorney, he prosecuted a large number of indictments. One trial and conviction under him led to the first execution in the county in many years. He served as District Attorney until 1883, when he was charged with accepting money from a murdered man's father to prosecute and convict the murderer, for which Governor Grover Cleveland removed him from office. His friends insisted he was removed for political reasons, and congressman James W. Covert defended him. He was nominated for the State Senate while the charges were pending, and he was removed from office immediately following the nomination. In 1885 and 1891, he unsuccessfully ran as a Democrat for County Judge.

In 1890, he became identified with a series of revival meetings in Staten Island held by the "boy evangelist" Harrison and converted. Shortly afterwards, he established the Holiday House, a summer home for Bayville working girls. By the time he died, his law partner was William J. Youngs.

== Personal life ==
In 1858, Downing married Georgina V. Underhill. They had a daughter, the wife of a Brooklyn physician. Downing died in Tampa, Florida, where he was staying for the previous several weeks for health reasons, on December 2, 1894. He was buried in the family plot in the Locust Valley Cemetery, Locust Valley, New York.

Legal offices
Preceded by John J. Armstrong	Queens County District Attorney; 1866–1883	Succeeded by John Fleming
