= The Dictionary Project =

- Founded: May 1995
- Type: 501(c)(3) charitable organization
- Purpose: Education
- Location: Charleston, South Carolina, U.S.
- Region served: All 50 United States, Puerto Rico, the US Virgin Islands, Canada, and various other countries
- Key people: Mary French, Director; Douglas Boggie, President; Dennis Brovarone, Board Member; Gary Pollmiller, Board Member; Terry LaCombe-Stevens, Board Member; David Carr, Board Member
- Revenue: $3,241,991 USD (Year Ending 12/31/21)
- Website: www.dictionaryproject.org

The Dictionary Project is a charitable organization based in Charleston, South Carolina, U.S.A., and was founded by Mary French in 1995 to provide personal copies of a dictionary for third grade students in the South Carolina public school system. It has grown into a national organization. To date, over 35 million dictionaries have been donated to children in the United States and internationally. It is funded through individual donations and by sponsors who implement the program in their local schools.

== Organization goals ==
The mission of The Dictionary Project is to ensure that everyone will be able to enjoy the benefits of owning a dictionary. This program assists people in becoming good writers, active readers, creative thinkers and resourceful learners by providing them with their own personal dictionary. The dictionaries are a gift. The project believes that a dictionary is an essential tool for a quality education and that a student cannot do his or her best work without one. The program is typically implemented in the third grade each year.

== Organization history and growth ==
The idea for The Dictionary Project began in 1992 when Annie Plummer of Savannah, Georgia gave 50 dictionaries to children who attended a school close to her home. In her lifetime she raised the money to buy 17,000 dictionaries for children in Savannah, Georgia. Annie Plummer died December 23, 1999. She inspired the creation of The Dictionary Project, a nonprofit organization.

The Dictionary Project was created in 1995 as a 501(c)(3) nonprofit organization based in Charleston, South Carolina. Its original goal was to provide dictionaries to third graders in the public schools in the three counties surrounding Charleston, and this was accomplished in the 1995-96 school year and every year since. In 2001 the project was expanded to cover the third graders in all of South Carolina’s public schools.

The project grew tremendously after it was featured in an article on the front page of The Wall Street Journal on March 4, 2002 This coverage brought national attention to the project and its founders, Mary and Arno French. As a result, individuals and groups from across the United States became involved with The Dictionary Project and sponsored the donation of dictionaries to children in their local schools.

The project continues to expand and now includes sponsors in all fifty United States, Puerto Rico, the US Virgin Islands, Canada, and various other countries. The program has been adopted by civic organizations and adapted to local communities through the sponsorship of Rotary Clubs, BPO Elks, Kiwanis Clubs, Granges, Pioneer Volunteer groups, Lions Clubs, the Republican Federation of Women and other service organizations, by educational groups such as PTAs, by businesses, and by individuals. Anyone can participate in this project by sponsoring a program to give dictionaries to children in their community.

Questions have arisen on the political nature of the dictionaries distributed to students. Dictionaries list the definition of the Republican Party but no mention of the Democratic Party. The definition of “female” includes the ability to have children. The excerpt on Donald Trump lists that he freed the United States from dependence on foreign oil during his first term.
