= Townsend D. Cock =

American farmer, banker, and politician (1838–1913)

Member of the New York Senate from the 1st district
- In office 1872–1873
- Preceded by: Samuel H. Frost
- Succeeded by: John A. King

Member of the New York State Assembly from the Queens County's 1st district
- In office 1876–1876
- Preceded by: L. Bradford Prince
- Succeeded by: Elbert Floyd-Jones

Member of the New York State Assembly from the Queens County's 1st district
- In office 1881–1882
- Preceded by: William J. Youngs
- Succeeded by: Louis K. Church

Personal details
- Born: Townsend Daniel Cock; December 3, 1838 Locust Valley, New York, U.S.
- Died: June 19, 1913 (aged 74) Locust Valley, New York, U.S.
- Party: Democratic
- Spouse: Jane Deall Latting (m. 1858)
- Occupation: Farmer, banker, politician

Townsend Daniel Cock (December 3, 1838 – June 19, 1913) was an American farmer, banker, and politician from New York.

== Life ==
Cock was born and died on the family farm in Locust Valley, then in Queens County, now in Nassau County, New York. He attended the common schools and then managed the family farm. In 1858, he married Jane Deall Latting. Later, he served as President of the Oyster Bay Bank.

He was Supervisor of the Town of Oyster Bay for several terms beginning in 1867.

He was a member of the New York State Senate (1st District) in 1872 and 1873, and of the New York State Assembly (Queens County, 1st District) in 1876, 1881, and 1882.

New York State Senate
Preceded by Samuel H. Frost	New York State Senate; 1st District; 1872–1873	Succeeded by John A. King
New York State Assembly
Preceded by L. Bradford Prince	New York State Assembly; Queens County, 1st District; 1876	Succeeded by Elbert Floyd-Jones
Preceded by William J. Youngs	New York State Assembly; Queens County, 1st District; 1881–1882	Succeeded by Louis K. Church
