= Frederick William Lord =

American politician

Member of the U.S. House of Representatives from New York's 1st district
- In office March 4, 1847 – March 3, 1849
- Preceded by: John W. Lawrence
- Succeeded by: John A. King

Personal details
- Born: December 11, 1800 Lyme, Connecticut
- Died: May 24, 1860 (aged 59) New York City, New York
- Party: Democratic

Frederick William Lord (December 11, 1800 – May 24, 1860) was an American educator, medical doctor, and politician who served one term as a United States representative from New York from 1847 to 1849.

== Early life and education ==
Born in Lyme, New London County, Connecticut, he attended Lyme Academy. He graduated from Yale College in 1821. He was a professor of mathematics in Washington College (in Chestertown, Maryland) for two years and was in charge of an academy at Baltimore for three years. He studied medicine in Baltimore and graduated in medicine from Yale College in 1828; he commenced the practice of medicine in Sag Harbor, New York. He was a medical doctor there for fifteen years.

== Career ==
Lord was a delegate to the Whig National Convention at Harrisburg, Pennsylvania, in 1840, and moved to Greenport in 1846 and engaged in agricultural pursuits and the cultivation of fruit and ornamental trees. He was elected as a Democrat to the Thirtieth Congress, holding office from March 4, 1847, to March 3, 1849.

He resumed his former pursuits in Greenport and was an unsuccessful candidate for election in 1854 to the Thirty-fourth Congress and in 1856 to the Thirty-fifth Congress.

== Congress and death ==
He was elected a delegate to the Republican National Convention at Chicago in 1860, but on his way to attend the convention was taken ill on the steamer Massachusetts, and died in New York City. Interment was in East Hampton Cemetery, East Hampton.

U.S. House of Representatives
Preceded by John W. Lawrence	Member of the U.S. House of Representatives from New York's 1st congressional district 1847–1849	Succeeded by John A. King
