= Charles S. Colden =

American judge

Charles Senff Colden (June 3, 1885 – September 14, 1960) was an American lawyer and judge from New York.

== Life ==
Colden was born on June 3, 1885, in Whitestone, New York, the son of David Colden and Harriet Brian. His father was a farmer who owned a prosperous ice, hay, and grain business. He was a direct descent of New York colonial governor Cadwallader Colden and a great-nephew of New York City mayor Cadwallader D. Colden.

Colden graduated from the Whitestone public school in 1900 and from Flushing High School in 1904. In 1906, he graduated from Jamaica Normal School for Teachers and worked as a teacher until 1913. He attended New York University while teaching, and in 1913 he received a Bachelor of Laws degree. He later received a Master of Laws degree from there. He began practicing law in 1913 in Whitestone independently. In 1920, he formed a partnership with Martin P. O'Leary under the firm name Colden & O'Leary, with central offices in Flushing and branch offices in Whitestone and Manhasset. During World War I, he was chairman of the local Legal Advisory Board. He served as the assistant district attorney of Queens County from 1918 to 1921.

In February 1932, after Queens County District Attorney James T. Hallinan was appointed to the New York Supreme Court, Governor Franklin D. Roosevelt appointed Colden to be the new Queens County District Attorney. He was elected for a full term of the position in November 1932. In January 1935, when Queens County Judge Thomas S. Kadien was appointed to the New York Supreme Court, Governor Herbert H. Lehman appointed Colden Queens County Judge in his place. Colden served as County Judge until 1943, when he was elected to the New York Supreme Court. He was a Democrat, but he was endorsed by the Republicans. He served as Justice on the Court until 1956, when he became the official referee of the Court. Furthermore, he was still refereeing when he died.

Colden was called the father of Queens College. In 1935, he was the organizer of the Queens College Association, which advocated for a college in the county. He was president of the association until his death. The college named its Center for Music and Speech after him, and he served as president of the Speech and Hearing Service Center until his resignation in 1949. In 1956, the college presented him an honorary Doctor of Laws degree for his leadership in founding the college.

Colden was chairman of the board of trustees of the Flushing Savings Bank, a trustee of the Bowne House Historical Society and the New York State Volunteer Fireman Home, and president of the St. David Society and the Queens County Bar Association, and a director of the Greater New York Chapter of the National Foundation for Infantile Paralysis. He was a member of Phi Delta Phi, the New York State Bar Association, the American Bar Association, the Long Island Historical Society, the New York State Historical Society, the Freemasons, the Odd Fellows, the Elks, the Flushing Bar Association, the Chamber of Commerce, and the Royal Arcanum. He was also president of the Whitestone Improvers' Association and a trustee of Flushing Hospital. He belonged to the Grace Episcopal Church of Whitestone. In 1909, he married Gunhild E. Dose. Their children were Helen and Charles Cadwallader.

Colden died in Flushing Hospital on September 14, 1960. He was buried in Flushing Cemetery.

Legal offices
Preceded by James T. Hallinan	Queens County District Attorney; 1932–1935	Succeeded by Charles P. Sullivan
