= Frank D. O'Connor =

American lawyer and politician

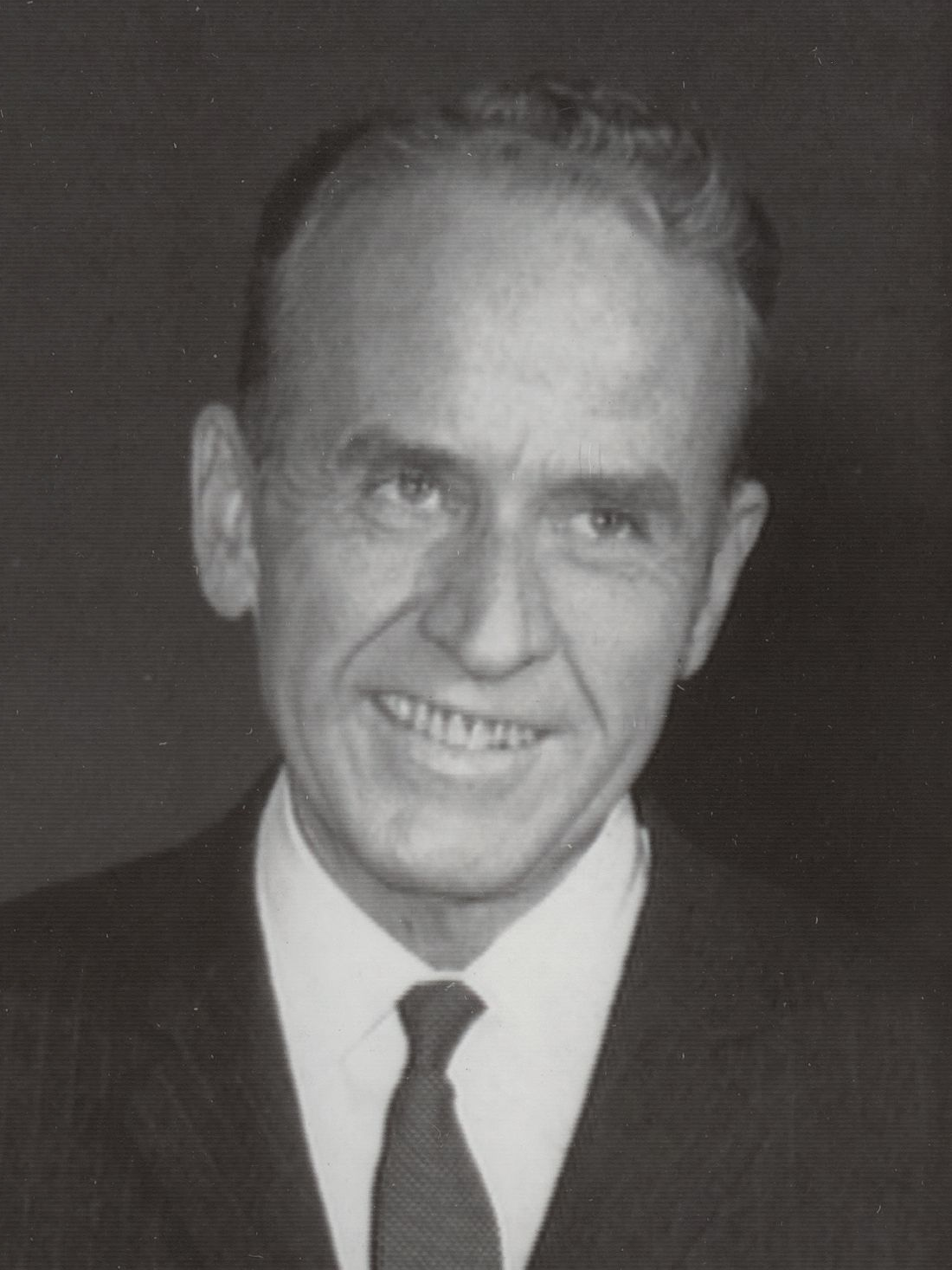
- O'Connor in 1966

6th President of the New York City Council
- In office January 1, 1966 – December 31, 1968
- Preceded by: Paul R. Screvane
- Succeeded by: Francis X. Smith

35th District Attorney of Queens County
- In office January 1, 1956 – December 31, 1965
- Preceded by: T. Vincent Quinn
- Succeeded by: Nat H. Hentel

Member of the New York State Senate
- In office January 1, 1949 – December 31, 1952
- Preceded by: Charles T. Corey
- Succeeded by: Bernard Tompkins
- Constituency: 6th district
- In office January 1, 1955 – December 31, 1955
- Preceded by: Thomas J. Cuite
- Succeeded by: Bernard Tompkins
- Constituency: 8th district

Personal details
- Born: December 20, 1909 Manhattan, New York City, New York
- Died: December 2, 1992 (aged 82) Flushing, Queens, New York City
- Party: Democratic
- Education: Newtown High School
- Alma mater: Niagara University; Brooklyn Law School

Frank D. O'Connor (December 20, 1909 – December 2, 1992) was an American lawyer and politician from New York.

== Life ==
O'Connor was born on December 20, 1909, in Manhattan, New York City, the son of Irish immigrants. He grew up in Elmhurst and graduated from Newtown High School and Niagara University in 1932, and from Brooklyn Law School in 1934. He served as a lieutenant in the U.S. Coast Guard during World War II. He later practiced law in Queens and became active in politics as a Democrat.

He was a member of the New York State Senate (6th Dist.) from 1949 to 1952, sitting in the 167th and 168th New York State Legislatures. In November 1952, he ran for re-election, but was defeated by Republican Bernard Tompkins.

O'Connor gained fame as a lawyer in 1953, when he defended Christopher Emmanuel Balestrero, a bass player at the Stork Club falsely accused of armed robbery. The story was the basis of the 1956 Alfred Hitchcock movie, The Wrong Man, in which O'Connor was portrayed by Anthony Quayle.

O'Connor was again a member of the State Senate (8th Dist.) in 1955. In November 1955, he was elected as District Attorney of Queens County, and remained in office from 1956 to 1965. He was a delegate to the 1960 and 1964 Democratic National Conventions. In 1966, he was the Democratic Party nominee for Governor of New York, losing to Nelson Rockefeller. He was President of the New York City Council from 1966 to 1968.

O'Connor was a justice of the New York Supreme Court from 1969 to 1979, and an Official Referee (i.e. a senior judge on an additional seat) of the Supreme Court from 1980 to 1985. From 1976 to 1985, he sat on the Appellate Division.

He died on December 2, 1992, in Booth Memorial Hospital in Flushing, Queens, from head injuries he had suffered 13 days earlier when he fell down a flight of stairs at his home.

New York State Senate
Preceded by Charles T. Corey	New York State Senate; 6th District; 1949–1952	Succeeded by Bernard Tompkins
Preceded by Thomas J. Cuite	New York State Senate; 8th District; 1955	Succeeded by Bernard Tompkins
Legal offices
Preceded by T. Vincent Quinn	District Attorney of Queens County; 1956–1965	Succeeded by Nat H. Hentel
Political offices
Preceded by Paul R. Screvane	President of the New York City Council; 1966–1968	Succeeded by Francis X. Smith
Party political offices
Preceded by Robert M. Morgenthau; 1962	Democratic Nominee for Governor of New York; 1966	Succeeded by Arthur Goldberg; 1970
