= Benevolent and Protective Order of Elks =

American fraternal order

- BPOE
- Founded: 1868; 158 years ago New York City, New York
- Type: Fraternal order
- Affiliation: Independent
- Status: Active
- Scope: National
- Pillars: Charity, Justice, Brotherly Love and Fidelity
- Colors: Royal Purple and White
- Symbol: Elk
- Publication: Elks Magazine
- Chapters: 1,781 local lodges
- Members: 750,000+ lifetime
- Nickname: The Elks, Elks Lodge
- Headquarters: Chicago, Illinois; United States
- Website: elks.org

The Benevolent and Protective Order of Elks (BPOE), commonly known as the Elks Lodge or simply The Elks, is an American fraternal order and charitable organization founded in 1868 in New York City. Originally established as a social club for minstrel show performers, it evolved into a nationwide brotherhood dedicated to community service, patriotism, and mutual aid. With over 750,000 members across 1,700-plus local lodges, the Elks are known for philanthropic programs supporting veterans, youth scholarships, and disaster relief. The organization upholds four pillars—Charity, Justice, Brotherly Love, and Fidelity—and maintains traditions like the nightly "Hour of Recollection" toast to absent members. Having restricted membership to white males until the late 20th century, the BPOE now admits all U.S. citizens over 21 who affirm belief in God. Its headquarters, the Elks National Veterans Memorial in Chicago, commemorates members who served in World War I.

== History ==
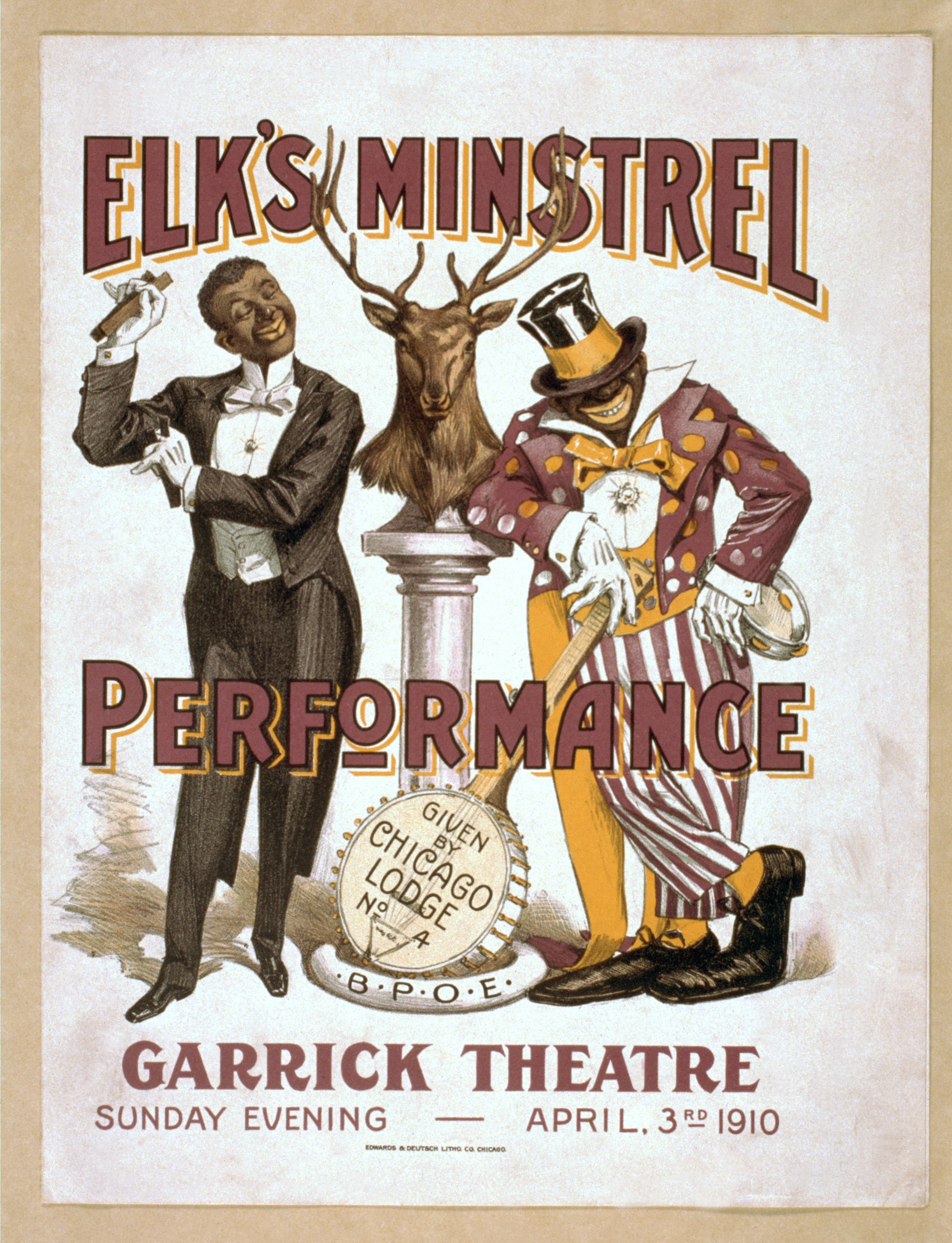
Elks charity performance poster from 1910

The Elks was established by actor Charles Algernon Sidney Vivian in New York City on February 16, 1868. Vivian was a British expatriate and member of the Royal Antediluvian Order of Buffaloes. Organized as a club for minstrel show performers, the impetus for the group's founding was the death of a fellow actor to disease due to a paucity of funds for treatment and a desire to organize communal support for fellow actors in need.

Founded as the "Jolly Corks", by December 1868, it had adopted the name Benevolent and Protective Order of Elks. By 1890, 173 lodges had been established throughout the United States. According to a late 19th century Black Book used internally by Elks, members were generally of the emerging professional managerial class such as traveling salesmen, realtors, bankers, and dentists; farmers and laborers were absent. Despite this diversification of professions, minstrelsy continued to be a major theme of Elks meetings, and amateur minstrel performances were central to Elks fundraising through the 1950s.

Like many other fraternal orders, the Elks at one point sponsored an insurance fund. The Elks Mutual Benefit Association (EMBA) was founded in 1878. At the 1885 Grand Lodge, it was reported that the EMBA was prosperous, but its finances were carelessly managed. The Association was disbanded after the 1907 Grand Lodge passed a resolution banning mutual or insurance features, as well as degrees and auxiliaries.

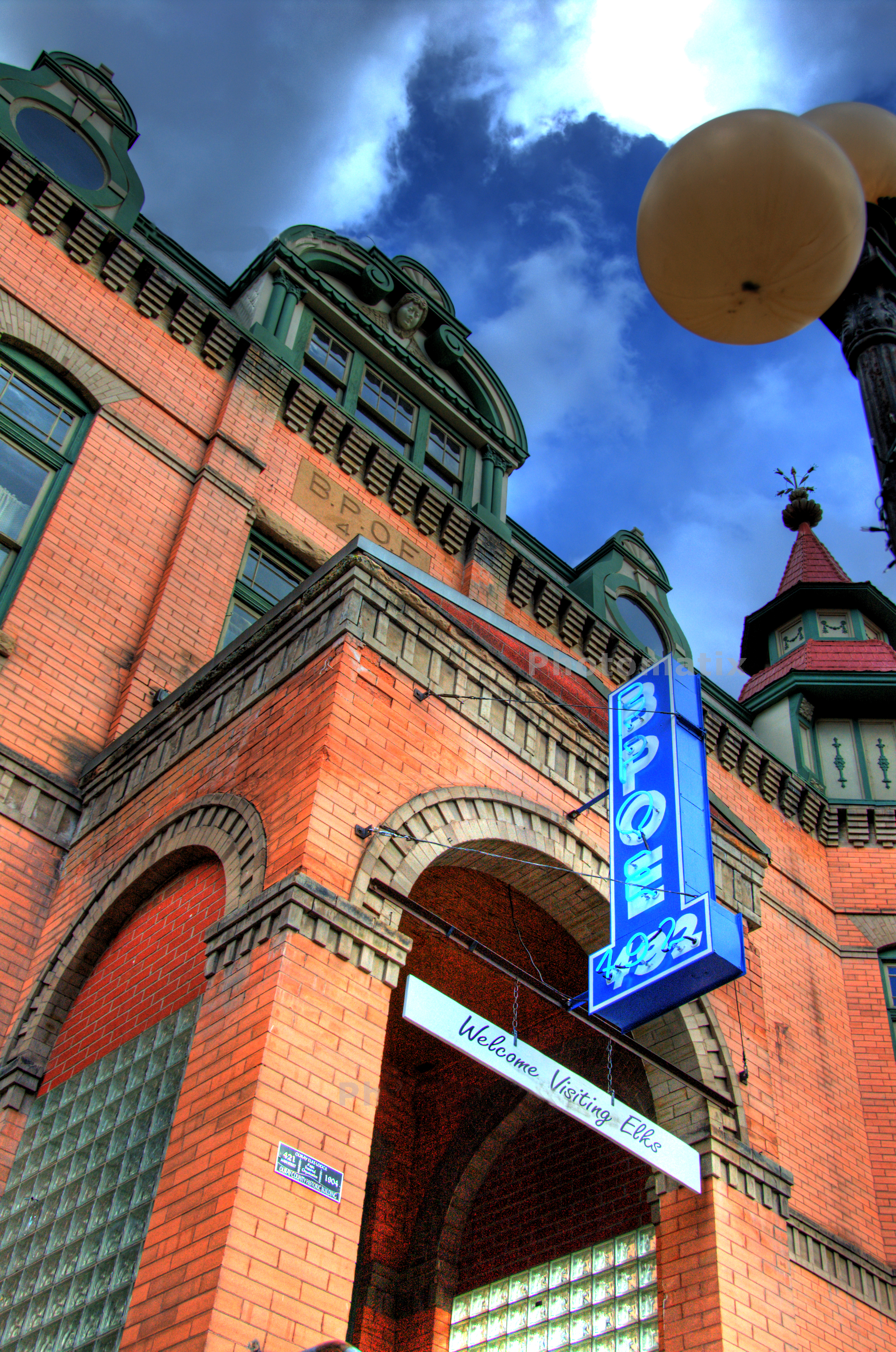
The Benevolent and Protective Order of Elks building in downtown Ouray, Colorado

The Elks National Home is a retirement home in Bedford, Virginia, built in 1916. In late 2013, the Elks sold the home to a private organization.

The Elks have shown their devotion to Americanism by conducting bond drives, promoting civil defense programs, and Flag Day observances. During World War II, they designated the week of March 15, 1942, as "Win the War Week", and helped recruit for the United States Army Air Corps. An "Elks National Service Commission" was in operation from 1946 to 1950, and the Grand Lodge adopted a "Declaration of American Principles" in 1961 in Miami.

In 1976, the Elks had 1,611,139 members. As of June 2020, it claimed to have more than 750,000 members.

== Symbols and traditions ==
The Elk was selected as a symbol for the organization because it is a herd animal that is native to America that is large and strong, yet graceful and fleet of foot. It was viewed as a noble animal. The head of a male elk was used on the fraternity's original badge and emblem.

The Elks' colors are royal purple and white. Purple represents high favor and kingship. White symbolizes purity and truth. These colors have a historic relationship with the clergy and royalty.

The fraternity's principles or pillars are Charity, Justice, Brotherly Love and Fidelity. Its anthem is "Auld Lang Syne". Elks Magazine is published 10 times a year and goes to all members.

The slogan "Hello Bill!" was coined during the Elks' National Re-Union in Minneapolis in 1897. William Goddard of Minneapolis Lodge No. 44 became known for this greeting as visiting Elks were frequently directed to him with phrases like "Go see Billy Goddard." This led to visitors greeting him with "Hello Bill!" The phrase quickly spread among attendees and became a lasting tradition within the Elks community. The slogan was used as a personal greeting and welcoming elks to the different national reunions. This can be seen in many historic photos.

=== Ritual ===
The Elks originally borrowed many rites, traditions, and regalia from the Freemasons. However, by the first decade of the twentieth century, much of this had been abandoned as the Elks sought to establish their own identity. The original two degrees required for membership were consolidated into one degree in 1890, the apron was discontinued in 1895, the secret password was gone in 1899, and the badges and secret handshake were abandoned by 1904.

=== Rites ===
Initiation and funeral rites still exist; however, the initiation rite is not considered a secret. The initiation involves an altar, with a Bible upon it, and a chaplain leading the members in prayers and psalms. The candidate must accept a "solemn and binding obligation" to never "reveal any of the confidential matters of the Order". The candidate further promises to uphold the Constitution of the United States, protect other Elks and their families, only support worthy candidates for admission, and never bring political or sectarian questions up into the Order. The funeral rite is called the "Lodge of Sorrow" and also involves prayers.

=== Hour of Recollection ===
Deceased and otherwise absent lodge members are recalled each evening at 11 p.m. Chimes or sometimes a bell will be rung 11 times and the Lodge Esquire intones, "It is the Hour of Recollection." The Exalted Ruler or a member designated by that person gives the 11 o'clock toast, of which this version is the most common:

You have heard the tolling of eleven strokes. This is to remind us that with Elks the hour of eleven has a tender significance. Wherever Elks may roam, whatever their lot in life may be, when this hour falls upon the dial of night, the great heart of Elkdom swells and throbs. It is the golden hour of recollection, the homecoming of those who wander, the mystic roll call of those who will come no more. Living or dead, Elks are never forgotten, never forsaken. Morning and noon may pass them by, the light of day sink heedlessly in the West, but ere the shadows of midnight shall fall, the chimes of memory will be pealing forth the friendly message: "To Our Absent Members."

— http://www.elks.org/

=== Memorial for "Absent Members" ===
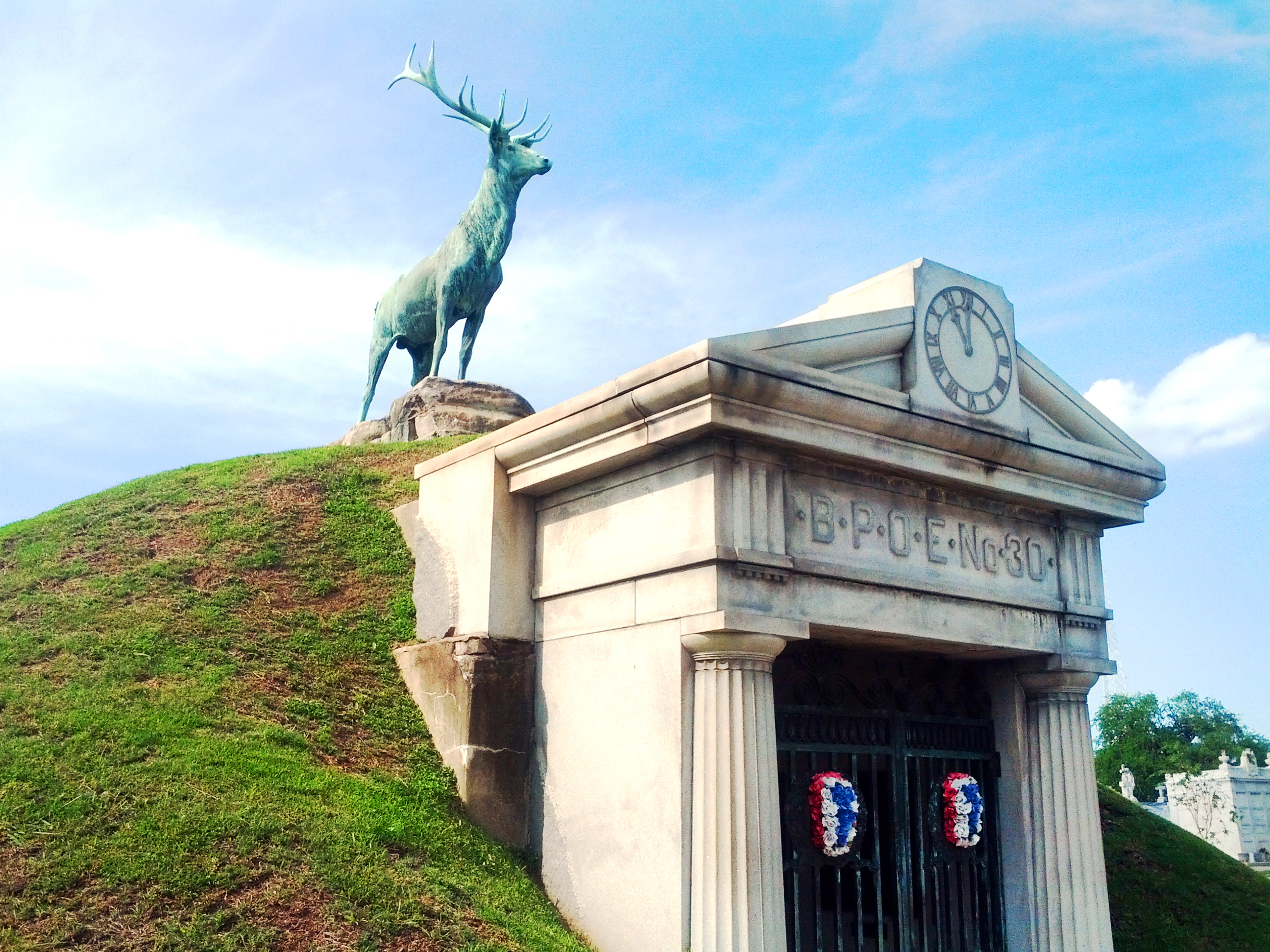
The communal tomb of Elks Lodge No. 30 in New Orleans, Louisiana.

The Lodge offers Funeral Services to members. This usually is available upon request. Details for this ceremony can be found in the "Rituals of Special Services" manual. Many Lodges have a memorial in their building or their Lodge room, dedicated to their absent members. The Elks have communal cemetery plots, which are often marked with statuary.

== Activities ==
=== Social quarters ===
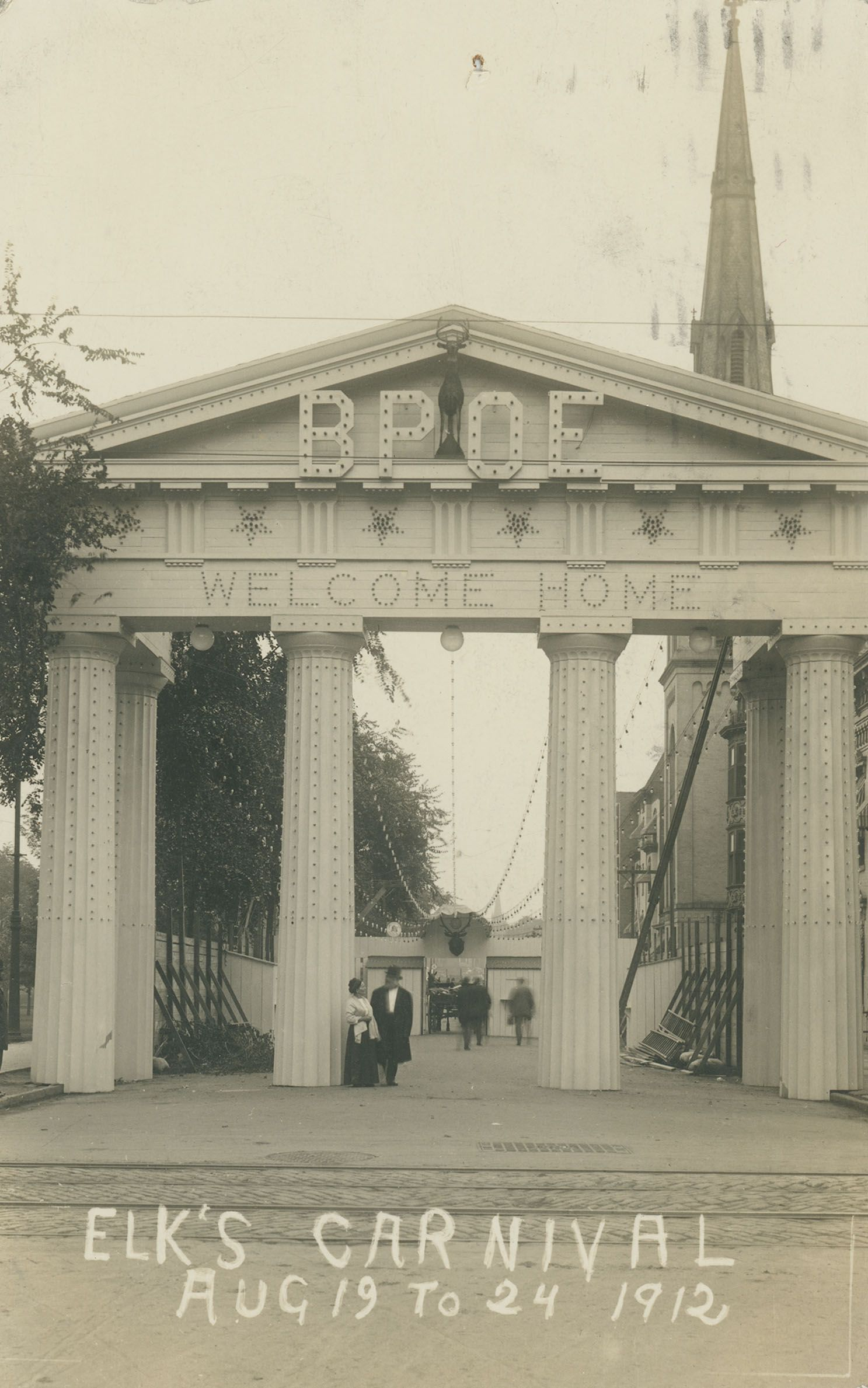
Elk's Carnival in Toledo, Ohio, 1912

Most Elks lodges operate social quarters with a private bar. According to sociologists Alvin J. Schmidt and Nicholas Babchuk, members primarily joined the Elks to be "provided with entertainment, liquor, and food at reasonable rates" in the social quarters.

=== National charity programs ===
Lodges are encouraged to participate in national Elks charity programs. There are also State Elks Association charity programs. This usually includes a State Major Project. Elks Lodges are usually involved in other local charitable efforts.

Due to the willingness of most Elks Lodges to respond to community needs and events, it has been internally common to turn the BPOE abbreviation into a backronym for "Best People on Earth".

==== Elks National Foundation ====
Established in 1928, the Elks National Foundation is the charitable arm of the BPOE. The foundation, with an endowment valued at more than $750 million, has contributed more than $500 million toward Elks' charitable projects nationwide. Since its inception, the Elks have received more than $288.7 million in contributions and bequests. As of the close of the 2021 fiscal year, they boast more than 120,000 active donors and an endowment fund valued at $833.1 million.

=== Veteran services ===
The Elks pledge that "So long as there are veterans, the Benevolent and Protective Order of Elks will never forget them."

- Elks Veterans Memorial in Chicago, Illinois
- The Army of Hope, established in 2003, primarily serves families of deployed service members.
- Adopt-A-Veteran Program
- Freedom Grants to serve veterans and/or military members in need of support or services.
- Veterans Leather Program
- Veterans Remembrance
- Playing Cards for Veterans
- Re-Creation USA

=== Youth programs ===
- Most Valuable Student scholarships
- Hoop Shoot (National free throw contest)
- Drug Awareness
- Soccer Shoot
- Junior Golf Program
- Dictionary Project
- Youth Recognition

== Membership ==
Candidates for membership must be:

- A citizen of the United States of America who will pledge allegiance to and salute the flag
- Over the age of 21
- A believer in God
- Of good character.
- Neither directly or indirectly participating in the activities of any group or organization, supporting or adhering to beliefs or tenets advocating the overthrow of the Government of the United States or any political subdivisions by force or violence.

== Organization ==
=== Headquarters ===
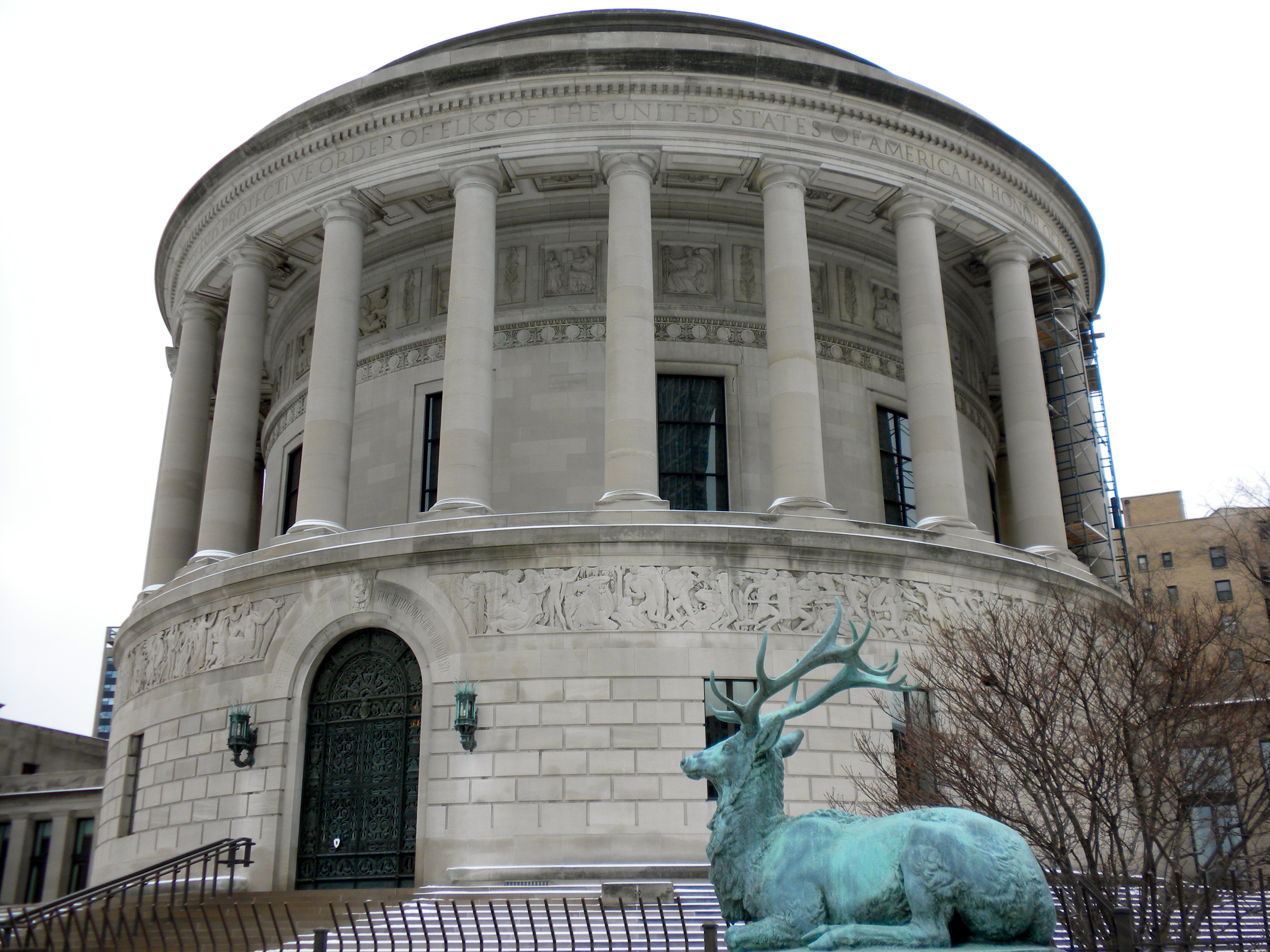
Grand Lodge in Chicago, Illinois

The Elks' national headquarters are located in Chicago at the Elks National Veterans Memorial and Headquarters, overlooking Lincoln Park, near Lake Michigan. This building was originally conceived as a memorial to the nearly 1,000 Elk brothers who were lost in World War I. The cornerstone was laid on July 7, 1924, and the building was officially dedicated on July 14, 1926.

The rotunda displays murals and statues illustrating the Elks' four cardinal virtues: charity, justice, brotherly love, and fidelity. The friezes depict the "Triumphs of War" on one side and "Triumphs of Peace" on the other. The entrance is flanked by large bronze elks.

=== Grand Lodge ===
The BPOE is organized on the national or "grand" level and the local lodge level. The Grand Lodge meets during the annual convention. Grand Lodge members nominate and elect the following officers:

- Grand Exalted Ruler—Similar to chief executive officer of an organization
- Grand Secretary
- Grand Esteemed Leading Knight
- Grand Esteemed Loyal Knight
- Grand Esteemed Lecturing Knight
- Grand Treasurer
- Grand Trustees

The three Knights assist the Grand Exalted Ruler and officiate in that person's absence; furthermore, the Grand Esteemed Loyal Knight acts as a prosecutor in cases when an Elk is accused of an offense against the order. The Grand Trustee has general authority over assets and property owned by the order. The Grand Esquire is appointed by the Grand Exalted Ruler to organize the Grand Lodges and serve as marshal of Elks' parades. The Grand Tiler, Grand Inner Guard, and Grand Chaplain are also appointed by the Grand Exalted Ruler.

=== State associations ===
The state-level organizations are called Elks State Associations. State-level officers include presidents, vice presidents, secretaries, and treasurers. Generally, state associations are set up to govern and control the State's Major Projects.

=== Lodges ===
Lodges officers are essentially the same as the ones on the national level, with the "Grand" prefix removed. Lodges also may establish dinner and recreational clubs for members. In 1979, there were 2,200 lodges. Lodges that are incorporated are required to be governed by a board of directors. Otherwise, the Lodge Trustees are the governing board.

== Antlers ==
Despite its 1907 resolution banning any auxiliaries, the Elks at one point had a youth affiliate for young men called the Antlers. The first chapter was organized in February 1922 by San Francisco Lodge #3. The 1927 Grand Lodge approved the junior order, granting the Grand Exalted Ruler the power to permit subordinate lodges to institute organizations for males under 21. In 1933, there were 45 local units of the Antlers with 3,584 members. However, the Antlers' numbers were decimated during the Second World War, with so many young men having gone off to war. Despite 86 local Antlers groups still existing in 1946, the Grand Lodge deleted all references to them in their constitution and bylaws that year. However, some local Antlers groups were still active in 1979, according to one source. Edit: Quote from the Courier Journal 10-18-1896 " The Antlers is a new orginization in Louisville [KY], but it will henceforth be a notable one................The new society is composed of members of the Louisville Lodge of Elks. It's aims conflict in no way with the parent order. It is merely a club within the order, its purpose being simply to hold social sessions and give entertainments at frequent intervals. The wives, sisters and sweethearts of the members are to figure largely in these entertainments, as was shown in the Antlers first social session held last evening..."

== Controversies and members misconduct ==
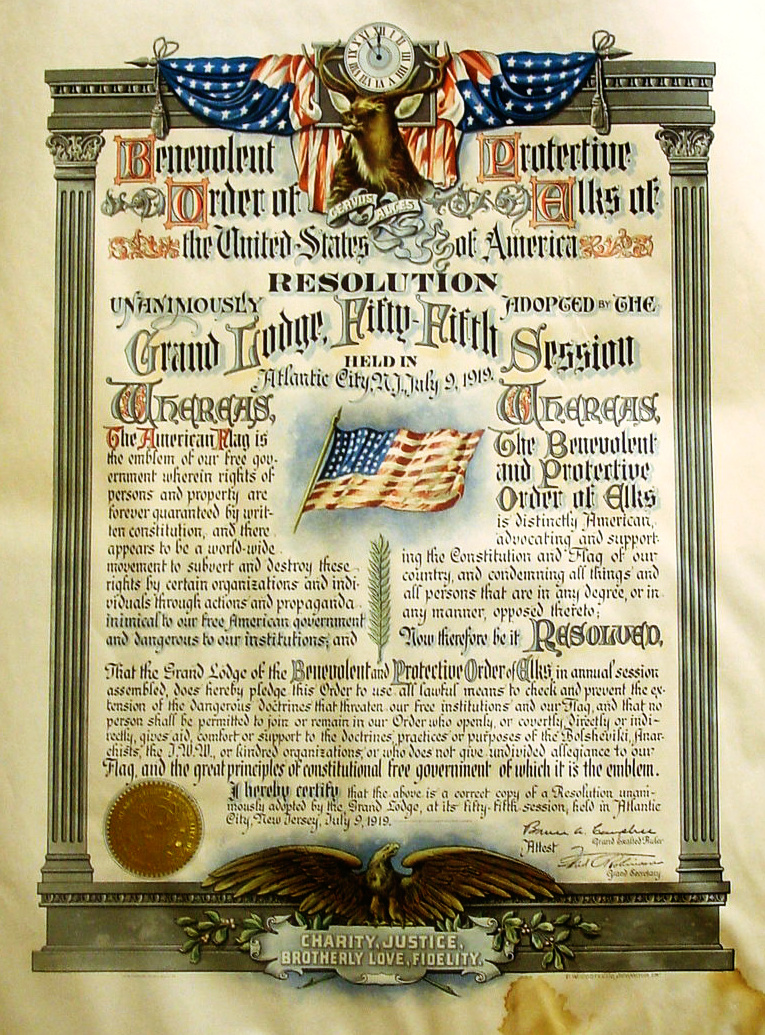
1919 Flag Day Resolution barring membership from people perceived as unpatriotic

Throughout American history, many Elks lodges have been criticized for excluding African-Americans, Jews, Italians, women, atheists, and others from membership. The Improved Benevolent and Protective Order of Elks of the World was founded in 1897 due to the exclusion of African-Americans from the BPOE.

In 1919, a "Flag Day resolution" was passed, barring membership to even passive sympathizers of the Bolsheviks, Anarchists, the I.W.W., or kindred organizations, or anyone who does not give undivided allegiance to the flag and constitution of the United States.

In 1979, the qualifications for membership included being male, at least 21 years old, of sound mind and body, a citizen of the United States, and not a member of the Communist Party.

=== Desegregation ===
In 1962, the Anti-Defamation League supported the decision by New York Elks Lodge No. 1 to eliminate their "Caucasians Only" membership criteria and expressed support for extending the BPOE's membership to other minority groups as well. A 1956 ADL study showed that nearly 15% of BPOE lodges in the survey excluded Jewish people from membership. Some lodges banned Jews from membership while other lodges made it difficult for Jews to become members.

In 1972, the Elks expelled the head of the Ridgewood, New Jersey lodge, Richard J. Zelenka, because of his advocacy against the Elks' discriminatory policies which limited membership to white men. By the following year, however, a resolution to repeal the discriminatory clause of the national constitution passed, desegregating the organization.

In Beynon v. St. George-Dixie Lodge 1743 (1993), the Utah Supreme Court ruled that while freedom of association allowed the Elks to remain a men-only organization, "the Elks may not avail itself of the benefits of a liquor license and the license's concomitant state regulation" as long as it violated the Utah State Civil Rights Act. Faced with losing their liquor licenses if they did not admit women, the Elks Lodges of Utah voted to become unisex in June 1993, which was followed by a vote at the Elks National Convention in July 1995 to remove the word "male" from the national membership requirements.

== Grand Exalted Rulers ==
This is a list of the organization's national presidents, known as the Grand Exalted Rulers (GER):

- Year - GER Name; Home Lodge Name (Lodge Number)
- 1871 – George J. Green / Charles T. White; New York, NY (#1)
- 1872 – Joseph C. Pinckney; New York, NY (#1)
- 1874 – James W. Powell; Philadelphia, PA (#2) / Henry P. O'Neil; New York, NY (#1)
- 1876 – Frank Girard; New York, NY (#1)
- 1878 – George R. Maguire; Philadelphia, PA (#2)
- 1879 – Charles E. Davies; Chicago, IL (#4) / Louis C. Waehner; New York, NY (#7)
- 1880 – Thomas E. Garrett; St Louis, MO (#9)
- 1882 – John J. Tindale; New York, NY (#1)
- 1883 – Edwin A. Perry; Boston, MA (#10)
- 1884 – Henry S. Sanderson; New York, NY (#1)
- 1885 – Daniel A. Kelly; Baltimore, MD (#7)
- 1886 – William E. English; Indianapolis, IN (#13)
- 1887 – Hamilton E. Leach; Washington, DC (#15)
- 1889 – Simon Quinlin; Chicago, IL (#4)
- 1890 – Simon Quinlin; Chicago, IL (#4)
- 1891 – Edwin B. Hay; Washington, DC (#15)
- 1892 – Edwin B. Hay; Washington, DC (#15)
- 1893 – Astley Apperly; Louisville, KY (#8)
- 1894 – Edwin B. Hay; Washington, DC (#15)
- 1895 – William G. Meyers; Philadelphia, PA (#2)
- 1896 – Meade D. Detweiler; Harrisburg, PA (#12)
- 1897 – Meade D. Detweiler; Harrisburg, PA (#12)
- 1898 – John Galvin; Cincinnati, OH (#5)
- 1899 – B.M. Allen; Birmingham, AL (#79)
- 1900 – Jerome B. Fisher; Jamestown, NY (#263)
- 1901 – Charles E. Pickett; Waterloo, IA (#290)
- 1902 – George P. Cronk; Omaha, NE (#39)
- 1903 – Joseph T. Fanning; Indianapolis, IN (#13)
- 1904 – Wm. J. O'Brien, Jr.; Baltimore, MD (#7)
- 1905 – Robert W. Brown; Louisville, KY (#8)
- 1906 – Henry A. Melvin; Oakland, CA (#171)
- 1907 – John K. Tener; Charleroi, PA (#494)
- 1908 – Rush L. Holland; Colorado Springs, CO (#309)
- 1909 – J.U. Sammis; LeMars, IA (#428)
- 1910 – August Herrmann; Cincinnati, OH (#5)
- 1911 – John P. Sullivan; New Orleans, LA (#30)
- 1912 – Thomas B. Mills; Superior, WI (#403)
- 1913 – Edward Leach; New York, NY (#1)
- 1914 – Raymond Benjamin; Napa, CA (#832)
- 1915 – James R. Nicholson; Springfield, MA (#61)
- 1916 – Edward Rightor; New Orleans, LA (#30)
- 1917 – Fred Harper; Lynchburg, VA (#321)
- 1918 – Bruce A. Campbell; Fairview Heights, IL (#664)
- 1919 – Frank L. Rain; Fairbury, NE (#1203)
- 1920 – Wm. M. Abbott; San Francisco, CA (#3)
- 1921 – W. W. Mountain; Flint, MI (#222)
- 1922 – J.E. Masters; Charleroi, PA (#494)
- 1923 – James G. McFarland; Watertown, SD (#838)
- 1924 – John G. Price; Columbus-Grove City, OH (#37)
- 1925 – William H. Atwell; Dallas, TX (#71)
- 1926 – Charles H. Grakelow; Philadelphia, PA (#2)
- 1927 – John F. Malley; Springfield, MA (#61)
- 1928 – George Murray Hulbert; New York, NY (#1)
- 1929 – Walter P. Andrews; Atlanta-Northlake, GA (#78)
- 1930 – Lawrence H. Rupp; Allentown, PA (#130)
- 1931 – John R. Coen; Sterling, CO (#1336)
- 1932 – Floyd E. Thompson; Moline, IL (#556)
- 1933 – Walter F. Meier; Seattle, WA (#92)
- 1934 – Michael F. Shannon; Los Angeles, CA (#99)
- 1935 – James T. Hallinan; Brooklyn Queensborough, NY (#878)
- 1936 – David Sholtz; Daytona Beach, FL (#1141)
- 1937 – Charles Spencer Hart; Mt Vernon, NY (#842)
- 1938 – Edward J. McCormick; Toledo, OH (#53)
- 1939 – Henry C. Warner; Dixon, IL (#779)
- 1940 – Joseph G. Buch; Trenton, NJ (#105)
- 1941 – John S. McClelland; Atlanta-Northlake, GA (#78)
- 1942 – E. Mark Sullivan; Boston, MA (#10)
- 1943 – Frank J. Lonergan; Portland, OR (#142)
- 1944 – Robert S. Barrett; Alexandria, VA (#758)
- 1945 – Wade H. Kepner; Wheeling, WV (#28)
- 1946 – Charles E. Broughton; Sheboygan, WI (#299)
- 1947 – L. A. Lewis; Anaheim, CA (#1345)
- 1948 – George I. Hall; Lynbrook, NY (#1515)
- 1949 – Emmett T. Anderson; Tacoma, WA (#174)
- 1950 – Joseph B. Kyle; Hobart, IN (#1152)
- 1951 – Howard R. Davis; Williamsport, PA (#173)
- 1952 – Sam Stern; Fargo, ND (#260)
- 1953 – Earl E. James; Oklahoma City, OK (#417)
- 1954 – William J. Jernick; Nutley, NJ (#1290)
- 1955 – John L. Walker; Roanoke, VA (#197)
- 1956 – Fred L. Bohn; Zanesville, OH (#114)
- 1957 – H. L. Blackledge; Kearney, NE (#984)
- 1958 – Horace R. Wisely; Salinas, CA (#614)
- 1959 – W. S. Hawkins; Coeur D Alene, ID (#1254)
- 1960 – John E. Fenton; Lawrence, MA (#65)
- 1961 – William A. Wall; West Palm Beach, FL (#1352)
- 1962 – Lee A. Donaldson; Etna, PA (#932)
- 1963 – Ronald J. Dunn; Oneida, NY (#767)
- 1964 – Robert G. Pruitt; Atlanta, GA (#1635)
- 1965 – R. Leonard Bush; Inglewood, CA (#1492)
- 1966 – Raymond C. Dobson; Minot, ND (#1089)
- 1967 – Robert E. Boney; Las Cruces, NM (#1119)
- 1968 – Edward W. McCabe; Nashville-Franklin, TN (#72)
- 1969 – Frank Hise; Corvallis, OR (#1413)
- 1970 – Glenn Miller; Logansport, IN (#66)
- 1971 - E. Gene Fournace; Newark, OH (#391)
- 1972 - Francis Smith; Sioux Falls, SD (#262)
- 1973 - Robert Yothers; Seattle, WA (#92)
- 1974 - Gerald Strohm; Fresno, CA (#439)
- 1975 - Willis McDonald; New Orleans, LA (#30)
- 1976 - George Klein; Lincoln, NE (#80)
- 1977 - Homer Huhn, Jr.; Mount Pleasant, PA (#868)
- 1978 - Leonard Bristol; Saranac Lake, NY (#1508)
- 1979 - Robert Grafton; North Palm Beach, FL (#2069)
- 1980 - H. Foster Sears; Macomb, IL (#1009)
- 1981 - Raymond Arnold; Jackson, MI (#113)
- 1982 – Marvin M. Lewis; Brawley, CA (#1420)
- 1983 - Kenneth Cantoli; Hasbrouck Heights, NJ (#1962)
- 1984 - Frank Garland; Centralia-Chehalis, WA (#2435)
- 1985 - Jack Traynor; Devils Lake, ND (#1216)
- 1986 - Peter Affatato; Hicksville, NY (#1931)
- 1987 - Ted Callicott; Paris, TN (#816)
- 1988 - Robert Sabin; Des Plaines, IL (#1526)
- 1989 - Donald Dapelo; Coalinga, CA (#1613)
- 1990 – James W. Damon; John Day, OR (#1824)
- 1991 – Lester C. "Ted" Hess, Jr.; Wheeling, WV (#28)
- 1992 – Vincent Collura; Lincoln, NE (#80)
- 1993 – Charles F. Williams; Plano-Richardson, TX (#2485)
- 1994 – Kenneth L. Moore; Corona, CA (#2045)
- 1995 – Edward Mahan; Framingham, MA (#1702)
- 1996 – Gerald L. Coates; Greensboro, NC (#602)
- 1997 – Carlon M. O'Malley; Wilkes-Barre/Scranton, PA (#109)
- 1998 – C. Valentine Bates; Gainesville, FL (#990)
- 1999 – James C. Varenhorst; Ludington, MI (#736)
- 2000 – Dwayne E. Rumney; Willmar, MN (#952)
- 2001 – Arthur Mayer, Jr.; Bergenfield, NJ (#1477)
- 2002 – Roger R. True; Tri-Cities, WA (#2755)
- 2003 – Amos A. McCallum; Biddeford-Saco, ME (#1597)
- 2004 – James M. McQuillan; Ogallala, NE (#1760)
- 2005 – Louis James Grillo; Stockton, CA (#218)
- 2006 – Arthur H. "Jack" Frost, III; Oak Ridge, TN (#1684)
- 2007 – F. Louis Sulsberger; Flora, IL (#1659)
- 2008 – Paul D. Helsel; Newark, DE (#2281)
- 2009 – James L. Nichelson; Ohio River Valley, OH (#231)
- 2010 – Michael F. Smith; Plant City, FL (#1727)
- 2011 – David R. Carr; Ticonderoga, New York (#1494)
- 2012 – Thomas S. Brazier; Santa Cruz, California (#824)
- 2013 – Millard C. Pickering; Sapulpa, Oklahoma (#1118)
- 2014 – John D. Amen; Denver, Colorado (#17)
- 2015 – Ronald L. Hicks; Fredericksburg, VA (#875)
- 2016 – Michael F. Zellen; Saugus-Everett, MA (#642)
- 2017 – Malcolm J. McPherson Jr.; Lyndhurst, NJ (#1505)
- 2018 – Michael T. Luhr; Petersburg, AK (#1615)
- 2019 – Robert L. Duitsman; Culver City, CA (#1917)
- 2020 – Paul R. Ryan; Willmar, MN (#952)
- 2021 – T. Keith Mills; Caldwell, ID (#1448)
- 2022 – Bruce A. Hidley; Watervliet-Colonie, NY (#1500)
- 2023 – Randy P. Shook; Lawrenceburg, TN (#2206)
- 2024 – Douglas A. Schiefer; Bucyrus, OH (#156)
- 2025 – Bryan R. Klatt; De Kalb, IL (#765)
- 2026 – Timothy F. Jaeger; Napa, CA (#832)

== See also ==
- Elks of Canada
- Improved Benevolent and Protective Order of Elks of the World
- List of Elks buildings
- Moose Lodge

== Notes and references ==
- Kelly, Mike. "Name That Elk". elks.org. Archived from the original on August 14, 2007. "Although the original Elks were actors and entertainers, members of other professions soon joined the organization. Today's Elks represent just about the full spectrum of occupations in America."
- Schmidt, Alvin J. Fraternal Orders Westport, Connecticut: Greenwood Press, 1980
