= James T. Hallinan =

American judge

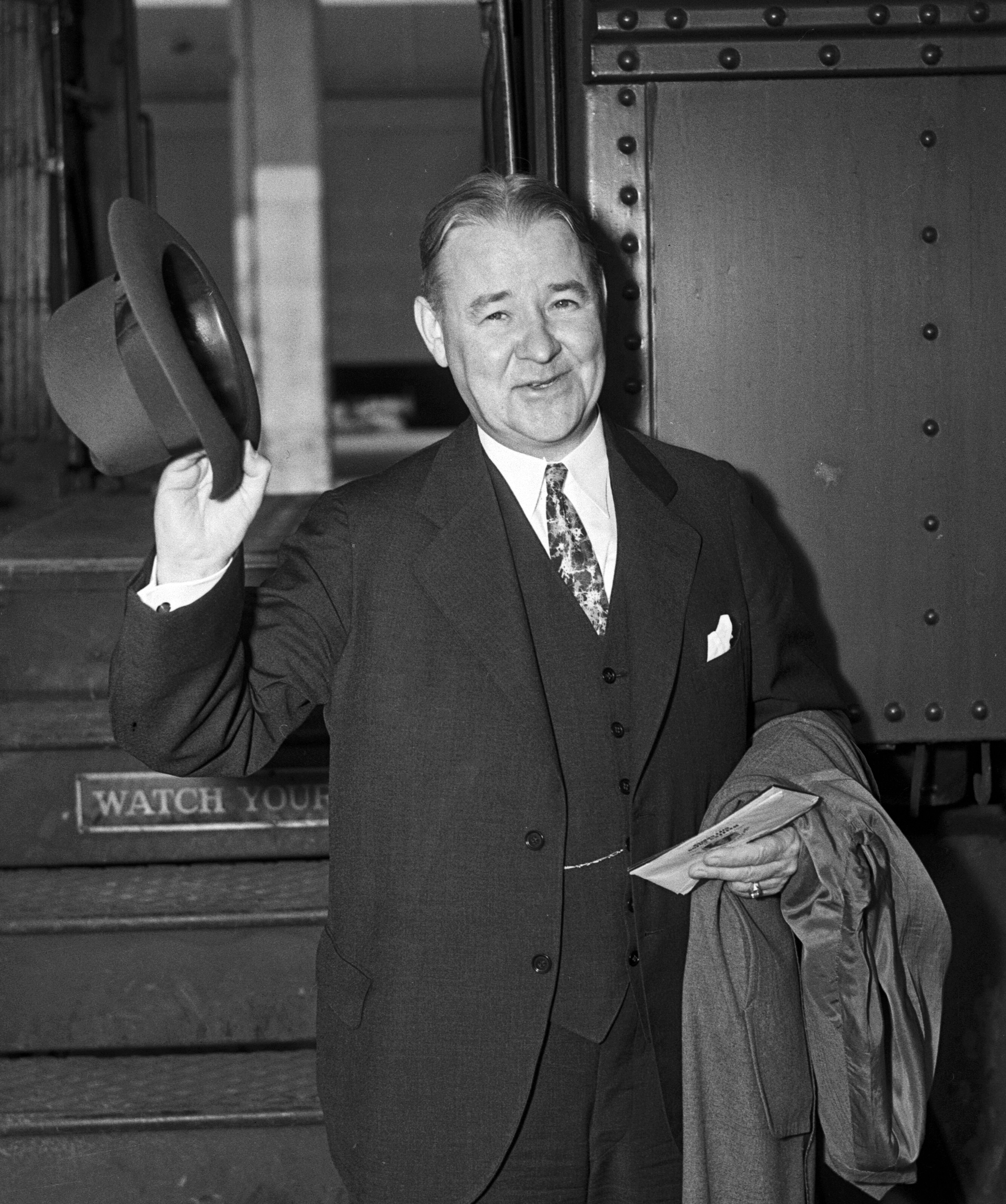
Hallinan in 1935

James T. Hallinan (June 1, 1889 – July 4, 1969) was an American lawyer and judge from New York.

== Life ==
Hallinan was born on June 1, 1889, in New York City, New York, the son of James Hallinan, a builder, and Mary Burns, an Irish immigrant from Waterford, Ireland.

Hallinan graduated from the New York Evening High School for Young Men in 1909. He then went to New York Law School, graduating from there with an LL.B. in 1911. He was admitted to the bar later that year and immediately began practicing general law as part of the firm Hallinan and Groh. He was also vice-president of the Airsota Realty Company in Astoria. In 1930, he became Queens County District Attorney. In 1931, he was elected to the New York Supreme Court. He was re-elected to the Court in 1945. In 1955, he was appointed to the Appellate Division, Second Department. He retired from the bench in 1960, although he served as an official referee until 1966.

Hallinan was Grand Exalted Ruler of the Elks in 1935 and chairman of its National Service Commission, president of the Emerald Society of Brooklyn, and state chairman of the Knights of Columbus. An active Catholic layman and supporter of the Dominican Order, he received the Bene Merente Medal from Pope Pius XI in 1926 and was made a Knight of St. Gregory by Pope Pius XII. He was a trustee of the New York Law School, the Flushing Savings Bank, St. Andrew Avelino Church in Flushing, St. John's Hospital in Elmhurst, the Roman Catholic Child Care Society of Brooklyn, St. Mary's of the Springs College in Columbus, Ohio, Albert Magnus College in New Haven, Connecticut, the Dominican Academy High School in Manhattan, and the Public Library of Queensborough. He was also a director of the American Irish Historical Society and a member of the Queens Chamber of Commerce, the Pomonok Country Club, the New York Athletic Club, the Catholic Club of New York, the New York County Bar Association, the New York State Bar Association, and the Queens County Bar Association. He attended the St. Andrew Roman Catholic Church in Flushing. He was a member of the Democratic Party. In 1916, he married Elizabeth Weeks. Their children were Joan, Richard, and Patricia.

Hallinan died at his home in Glen Cove on July 4, 1969. He was buried in Mount Saint Mary Cemetery in Flushing.

Legal offices
Preceded by Richard S. Newcombe	Queens County District Attorney; 1930–1931	Succeeded by Charles S. Colden
