= Queens County District Attorney =

State prosecutor in New York

District Attorney of Queens County

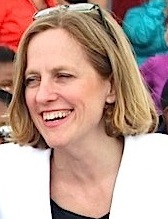
- Incumbent; Melinda Katz since January 1, 2020
- Type: District attorney
- Member of: District Attorneys Association of the State of New York
- Term length: Four years
- Formation: February 12, 1796
- First holder: Nathaniel Lawrence
- Deputy: Chief Assistant District Attorney, Shawn Clark
- Website: www.queensda.org

The District Attorney of Queens County is the elected district attorney for Queens County in New York State, coterminous with the New York City borough of Queens. The office is responsible for the prosecution of violations of New York state laws. (Federal law violations in Queens are prosecuted by the U.S. Attorney for the Eastern District of New York). The current Queens County District Attorney is Melinda Katz, who assumed the duties of the office on January 1, 2020. There was an inauguration on January 6, 2020 at her alma mater, St. Johns University.

== History ==
In a legislative act of February 12, 1796, New York State was divided into seven districts, each with its own Assistant Attorney General. Queens County was part of the First District, which also included Kings, Richmond, Suffolk, and Westchester counties. (At that time, Queens County included much of present-day Nassau County, and Westchester County included present-day Bronx County.) In 1801, the office of Assistant Attorney General was renamed District Attorney. At the same time, New York County was added to the First District. Westchester County was separated from the First District in 1813, and New York County was separated in 1815. In 1818, all 13 districts were broken up, and each county in the State of New York became a separate district.

Until 1822, the district attorney was appointed by the Council of Appointment, and held the office "during the Council's pleasure", meaning that there was no defined term of office. Under the provisions of the State Constitution of 1821, the D.A. was appointed to a three-year term by the County Court. Under the provisions of the State Constitution of 1846, the office became elective by popular ballot. The term was three years, beginning on January 1 and ending on December 31. In case of a vacancy, the Governor of New York filled the vacancy temporarily until a successor was elected, always to a full term, at the next annual election.

One year after the 1898 Consolidation of New York City, Nassau County was separated from Queens County. In case of a vacancy, a DA is appointed by the Governor to fill the office temporarily. A new DA is then elected at the next annual election in November, always to a full term. From 1847 to 1942, the term length was three years. In November 1942, a DA was elected to a one-year term. From the election of November 1943, the DA has been elected to a four-year term.

== List of district attorneys ==
| No. | District attorney | Dates in office | Party | Notes |
|---|---|---|---|---|
| 1 | Nathaniel Lawrence | February 16, 1796 – July 15, 1797 | Dem.-Rep. | died |
| | vacant | July 15, 1797 – January 16, 1798 | | |
| 2 | Cadwallader D. Colden | January 16, 1798 – August 19, 1801 | Federalist | |
| 3 | Richard Riker | August 19, 1801 – February 13, 1810 | Dem.-Rep. | |
| 4 | Cadwallader D. Colden | February 13, 1810 – February 19, 1811 | Federalist | |
| 5 | Richard Riker | February 19, 1811 – March 5, 1813 | Dem.-Rep. | |
| 6 | Barent Gardenier | March 5, 1813 – April 8, 1815 | Federalist | |
| 7 | Thomas S. Lester | April 8, 1815 – June 12, 1818 | ? | |
| 8 | Eliphalet Wickes | June 12, 1818 – 1821 | Dem.-Rep. | |
| 9 | William T. McCoun | 1821 – 1826 | | |
| 10 | Benjamin F. Thompson | 1826 – 1836 | | |
| 11 | William H. Barroll | May 3, 1836 – 1842 | | |
| 12 | Alexander Hadden | 1842 – 1845 | Whig | |
| 13 | John G. Lamberson | 1845 – December 31, 1853 | | last to be appointed by the County Court and first to be elected by popular ballot (in May 1847), total of three terms |
| 14 | William H. Onderdonk | January 1, 1854 – December 31, 1859 | | elected to two three-year terms |
| 15 | John J. Armstrong | January 1, 1860 – December 31, 1865 | | elected to two three-year terms |
| 16 | Benjamin W. Downing | January 1, 1866 – October 26, 1883 | Democratic | elected to six three-year terms; removed from office by Governor Grover Cleveland for malfeasance |
| 17 | John Fleming | October 27, 1883 – December 31, 1883 (interim); January 1, 1884 – December 31, 1886 | Democratic | appointed by Governor Cleveland to replace Downing; elected to a three-year term; lost re-election to McGowan |
| 18 | Thomas F. McGowan | January 1, 1887 – May 1, 1887 | Democratic | elected to a three-year term over Fleming; fled to Canada after it became known that as Supervisor of the Town of Newtown, he stole about $19,500 in town money to cover his losses speculating in the stock exchange |
| – | Albert F. Cornelius | May 1, 1887 – June 13, 1887 (acting) | Democratic | became acting district attorney upon McGowan's fleeing to Canada |
| 19 | John Fleming (second term) | June 13, 1887 – August 10 (acting); August 10, 1887 – December 31, 1887 (interim); January 1, 1888 – December 31, 1893 | Democratic | appointed by Judge Bartlett of the Queens County Court of Oyer and Terminer in place of McGowan; appointed by Governor David B. Hill to fill McGowan's term for the remainder of the year; elected to the remainder of McGowan's term; elected to a three-year term; lost re-election to Noble |
| 20 | Daniel Noble | January 1, 1894 – December 31, 1896 | Democratic | defeated Fleming in election to a three-year term |
| 21 | William J. Youngs | January 1, 1897 – December 14, 1898 | Republican | elected to a three year-term; resigned to become private secretary to Governor Theodore Roosevelt |
| 22 | George W. Davison | December 14, 1898 – January 2, 1899 (acting); January 2, 1899 – December 31, 1899 (interim) | Republican | became acting district attorney when Youngs resigned; appointed by Roosevelt for the remainder of Youngs' term; lost election to Merrill |
| 23 | John B. Merrill | January 1, 1900 – December 31, 1902 | Democratic | elected to a three-year term |
| 24 | George A. Gregg | January 1, 1903 – December 31, 1905 | Democratic | elected to a three-year term |
| 25 | Ira G. Darrin | January 1, 1906 – December 31, 1908 | Municipal Ownership League | elected to a three-year term; did not run for re-election |
| 26 | Frederick G. DeWitt | January 1, 1909 – December 31, 1911 | Democratic | elected to a three-year term |
| 27 | Matthew J. Smith | January 1, 1912 – December 31, 1914 | Democratic | elected to a three-year term |
| 28 | Denis O'Leary | January 1, 1915 – December 31, 1920 | Democratic | elected to two three-year terms; lost to Wallace on his re-election attempt on the Fusion and Liberal tickets |
| 28 | Denis O'Leary | January 1, 1915 – December 31, 1920 | Republican and Fusion | elected to two three-year terms; lost to Wallace on his re-election attempt on the Fusion and Liberal tickets |
| 29 | Dana Wallace | January 1, 1921 – December 31, 1923 | Republican | elected to a three-year term |
| 30 | Richard S. Newcombe | January 1, 1924 – December 31, 1929 | Democratic | elected to two three-year terms; did not run for re-election (ran for Surrogate instead, and won) |
| 31 | James T. Hallinan | January 1, 1930 – January 1, 1932 | Democratic | elected to a three-year term; resigned after election as a justice of the New York Supreme Court |
| - | Charles P. Sullivan | January 1, 1932 – February 15, 1932 (acting) | Democratic | became acting district attorney upon Hallinan's resignation |
| 32 | Charles S. Colden | February 15, 1932 – December 31, 1932 (interim); January 1, 1933 – January 7, 1935 | Democratic | appointed by Governor Franklin Roosevelt to succeed Hallinan; elected to a three-year term; appointed by Governor Herbert H. Lehman to a vacant seat on the Queens County Court |
| 33 | Charles P. Sullivan | January 7, 1935 – December 31, 1951 | Democratic | became acting district attorney again upon Colden's resignation; appointed by Governor Lehman to fill Colden's vacancy for the remainder of the year?; elected five times; denied the Democratic nomination in the primary, ran on the Liberal and No Boss lines and lost |
| 34 | T. Vincent Quinn | January 1, 1952 – December 31, 1955 | Democratic | elected to a four-year term; lost to O'Connor in the Democratic primary election |
| 35 | Frank D. O'Connor | January 1, 1956 – December 31, 1965 | Democratic | defeated Quinn in Democratic primary; elected to three four-year terms; resigned after winning election to President of the New York City Council |
| 36 | Nat H. Hentel | December 31, 1965 – December 31, 1966 (interim) | Republican | appointed by Governor Nelson A. Rockefeller for one year; lost election to Mackell |
| 37 | Thomas J. Mackell | January 1, 1967 – April 23, 1973 | Democratic | elected to serve the remainder of O'Connor's term; elected to two four-year terms; resigned after being indicted on charges of covering up an investigation into his investments and Governor Rockefeller began proceedings to remove him |
| – | Frederick J. Ludwig | April 23, 1973 – May 9, 1973 (acting) | Democratic | became acting district attorney when Mackell announced his resignation and went on vacation |
| 38 | Michael F. Armstrong | May 9, 1973 – December 31, 1973 (interim) | Democratic | appointed by Governor Rockefeller for the remainder of the year to replace Mackell; did not run for election |
| 39 | Nicholas Ferraro | January 1, 1974 – December 31, 1976 | Democratic | elected to a four-year term; resigned after winning election as a New York Supreme Court justice |
| 40 | John J. Santucci | January 1, 1977 – December 31, 1977 (interim); January 1, 1978 – June 1, 1991 | Democratic | appointed by Governor Hugh Carey for the remainder of Ferraro's term; elected to four four-year terms; resigned |
| 41 | Richard A. Brown | June 1, 1991 – December 31, 1991 (interim); January 1, 1992 – May 4, 2019 | Democratic | appointed by Governor Mario M. Cuomo for the remainder of the year; elected to seven four-year terms; died in office |
| – | John M. Ryan | May 4, 2019 – December 31, 2019 (acting) | Independent | named acting district attorney by Brown for medical reasons, although Brown continued in an official capacity until his death; did not run for election |
| 42 | Melinda Katz | January 1, 2020 – current | Democratic | elected to two four-year terms |
