= William J. Youngs =

American lawyer and politician (1851–1916)

United States Attorney for the Eastern District of New York
- In office 1902–1915
- Preceded by: George H. Pettit
- Succeeded by: Louis R. Bick

Queens County District Attorney
- In office 1897–1898
- Preceded by: Daniel Noble
- Succeeded by: George W. Davison

Member of the New York State Assembly from the Queens County's 1st district
- In office 1879–1880
- Preceded by: Elbert Floyd-Jones
- Succeeded by: Townsend D. Cock

Personal details
- Born: William Jones Youngs; June 24, 1851 Oyster Bay, New York, U.S.
- Died: April 27, 1916 (aged 64) Garden City, New York, U.S.
- Resting place: Youngs Memorial Cemetery, Oyster Bay, New York
- Party: Republican
- Spouses: Eleanor Smith Jones (m. 1879; died 1883) Helen Louise Mason (died 1889) May Benson Emory ()
- Children: 2 daughters
- Education: Cornell University (1872)
- Occupation: Lawyer, politician, editor

William Jones Youngs (June 24, 1851 – April 27, 1916) was an American lawyer and politician from New York.

== Life ==
Youngs was born on June 24, 1851, in Oyster Bay, New York, the son of Daniel Kelsey Youngs and Sarah Elizabeth Smith. He was a direct descendant of John Youngs, whose son Thomas settled in Oyster Bay in about 1650 and built the Youngs homestead the family lived in until 1913, when Youngs leased the house and moved away. On his mother's side, he was a descendant of Captain John Underhill.

Youngs graduated from Locust Valley Public School in 1864, Harrington's Academy in 1865, Huntington High School in 1868, and Cornell University in 1872. He then entered the law office of Benjamin W. Downing and was admitted to the bar in 1873. Later that year he was appointed Assistant District Attorney of Queens County, an office he held until 1875. He then began a law practice in Oyster Bay.

In 1878, Youngs was elected to the New York State Assembly as a Republican, representing the Queens County 1st District. He served in the Assembly in 1879 and 1880. In 1896, he was elected Queens County District Attorney. He resigned in 1898 to serve as newly elected governor Theodore Roosevelt's private secretary. He was Roosevelt's neighbor and an early supporter of his gubernatorial campaign. In 1901, he was appointed Deputy Superintendent of Banks. In 1902, now-President Roosevelt appointed him United States Attorney for the Eastern District of New York. He resigned from the office in 1915. He then became editor of The Hempstead Inquirer, and at the time of his death he was United States Commissioner of the Eastern District.

In 1879, Youngs married Eleanor Smith Jones, who died in 1883. He then married Helen Louise Mason, who died in 1889. He then married May Benson Emory. He had two surviving daughters, Mary and Helen. He was a member of the Freemasons, Chi Psi, and the Cornell Club of New York.

Youngs died at his home in Garden City on April 27, 1916. He was buried in Youngs Memorial Cemetery.

New York State Assembly
Preceded by Elbert Floyd-Jones	New York State Assembly; Queens County, 1st District; 1879–1880	Succeeded by Townsend D. Cock
Legal offices
Preceded by Daniel Noble	Queens County District Attorney; 1897–1898	Succeeded by George W. Davison
Preceded by George H. Pettit	U.S. Attorney for the Eastern District of New York; 1902–1915	Succeeded by Louis R. Bick
