= William H. Onderdonk =

American lawyer

William Handy Onderdonk (March 5, 1820 – December 11, 1882) was an American lawyer from New York.

== Life ==
Onderdonk was born on March 5, 1820, in New York City, New York, the son of Bishop Benjamin T. Onderdonk and Eliza Handy Moscrop. He went to Columbia Grammar & Preparatory School.

Onderdonk went to Trinity School. He began studying law under Joseph Blunt when he was 16. After he was admitted to the bar he stayed in New York City in Blunt's office. In 1846, he moved to Queens County. A Whig, he was elected Queens County District Attorney in 1853 and re-elected to the office in 1856. In 1865, he was elected surrogate of Queens County, and he served in that office until 1870. He resided in Great Neck, but maintained a law office in New York City.

Onderdonk was a member and vestryman of the Christ Episcopal Church in Manhasset. In 1843, he married Harriet S. Mott, a cousin of the surgeon Valentine Mott. Their son, Robert Mott, died at age 11. Their daughter, Harriet Cogswell Onderdonk, married Samuel Vernon Mann,

Onderdonk died at his New York City home on December 11, 1882. He was buried in Christ Church Cemetery in Manhasset.

Legal offices
Preceded by John G. Lamberson	Queens County District Attorney; 1854–1859	Succeeded by John J. Armstrong
