= Michael F. Armstrong =

American lawyer (1932–2019)

- Born: Michael Francis Armstrong; December 14, 1932; Manhattan, New York, US
- Died: October 17, 2019 (aged 86); Manhattan, New York, US
- Occupation: Lawyer

Michael Francis Armstrong (December 14, 1932 – October 17, 2019) was an American lawyer, based in New York City.

In 1991, The New York Times described him as "the consummate New York lawyer."

== Biography ==
Armstrong graduated from Yale University with a B.A. in 1954, then served in the US Air Force, and graduated from Harvard Law School in 1960.

He first worked as a lawyer as an associate at Cahill Gordon. Armstrong was an Assistant United States Attorney for the Southern District of New York from 1962 to 1967, after which he returned to Cahill Gordon as a partner in 1968.

From 1970 to 1972, Armstrong was chief counsel to the Knapp Commission on New York City police corruption. In 1973 he was named interim Queens District Attorney by Governor Nelson Rockefeller to fill out remainder of the term of Thomas J. Mackell, who had been indicted and resigned.

Armstrong represented the children of Martha "Sunny" von Bulow in a civil suit against her husband, Claus von Bülow, over her estate. The suit settled when Claus von Bülow in 1987 agreed to give up his claim to the estate.

Later, he was chairman of the review panel on the Central Park jogger case. In 2002 New York City Police Commissioner Raymond Kelly commissioned a panel of three lawyers, including him, to review the case. The panel issued a 43-page report in January 2003. The panel disputed the claim of one man, Matias Reyes, that he alone had raped the jogger. The report concluded that the five men who had been convicted, but whose convictions had been vacated, had "most likely" participated in the beating and rape of the jogger, and that the "most likely scenario" was that "both the defendants and Reyes assaulted her, perhaps successively."

In June 2005 New York City Mayor Michael Bloomberg appointed Armstrong chairman of The Commission to Combat Police Corruption. The panel was formed in 1995, and conducts audits and studies on the department's anticorruption strategies.

Armstrong died at his home in Manhattan on October 17, 2019.

Legal offices
Preceded by Thomas J. Mackell	District Attorney of Queens County (interim); 1973	Succeeded by Nicholas Ferraro
