= James A. Roe =

American politician

James A. Roe Sr.
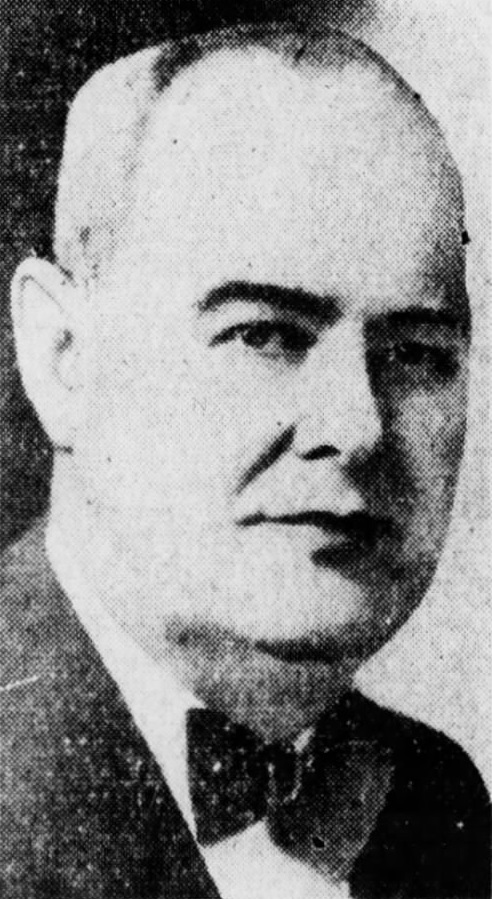

Member of the U.S. House of Representatives from New York's 5th district
- In office January 3, 1945 – January 3, 1947
- Preceded by: James J. Heffernan (redistricting)
- Succeeded by: Robert Tripp Ross

Personal details
- Born: July 9, 1896 Flushing, Queens, New York
- Died: April 22, 1967 (aged 70) Hollywood, Florida, U.S.
- Resting place: Mount Saint Mary Cemetery in Flushing
- Party: Democratic Party

James A. Roe Sr. (July 9, 1896 – April 22, 1967) was an American World War I and World War II veteran and politician from New York. He served as the leader the Queens County Democratic committee from 1938 to 1954 and a single term in the United States House of Representatives from 1945 to 1947.

== Early life and career ==
Roe was born July 9, 1896, in Flushing, Queens. His father, James A. Roe, was a clerk of the court who was descended from an Irish family. Roe attended Flushing High School and later played semi-pro baseball.

At the outset of World War I in 1917, he joined the Army and graduated from the Army's School of Military Aeronautics at Cornell University and served in the United States Army Signal Corps. After the war he worked as a real estate and insurance broker, became involved in contracting and engineering business, and was on the board of directors of the Flushing National Bank. He developed tracts of land in Flushing and Murray Hill during his real estate career.

== Political career ==
He became active in the Queens Democratic Party and supported Franklin Delano Roosevelt for president in 1932. In 1934, he lost a bid for the party leadership but continued to contest the chairmanship of James Sheridan. After four years of infighting, Roe upset Sheridan for the leadership in 1938.

=== Congress ===
After the United States entered World War II, Roe volunteered for Army service and was commissioned as a major in the Corps of Engineers. In 1944, while still serving in the Army, Roe was elected to Congress from New York's 5th congressional district. He resigned his commission to take his seat his seat in Congress and was discharged as a lieutenant colonel.

He courted controversy in 1948 when he led a movement to draft Dwight Eisenhower to run for president while the general's political affiliation was unknown. Roe believed that Harry Truman would be defeated in the 1948 election and decided that the Queens delegation would not support anyone at the 1948 Democratic National Convention. The delegation voted for Roe on the first ballot. Despite his move and calls for him to resign, Roe was re-elected as party leader.

=== Later political career ===
Roe supported the successful candidacy of Vincent R. Impellitteri for mayor in 1950 but found himself at odds with Tammany Hall when Impellitteri ran for re-election in 1953. The Tammany-backed candidate, Robert F. Wagner Jr., refused Roe's endorsement and worked to oust him from the party. His refusal to support W. Averell Harriman for Governor of New York in 1954 led to his ouster. He continued to work behind the scenes as an insurgent and supported some successful candidates; but did not return to the party leadership.

He was a delegate to the National Democratic conventions in 1940, 1948 and 1960.

== Personal life ==
During the war he met Margaret Farrell, whom he married in 1920. They had four children. His son, James A. Roe Jr., served as a justice of the New York Supreme Court. He was indicted for attempting to offer a $10 bribe to two police officers during a 1968 traffic stop, and was acquitted one day after he was killed in a plane crash.

=== Death and burial ===
After leaving politics, he resumed his former business interests. Roe died in Hollywood, Florida, on April 22, 1967, and was buried at Mount Saint Mary Cemetery in Flushing.

U.S. House of Representatives
Preceded by James J. Heffernan	Member of the U.S. House of Representatives from New York's 5th congressional district 1945–1947	Succeeded by Robert Tripp Ross
