= Patrick Gleason (politician) =

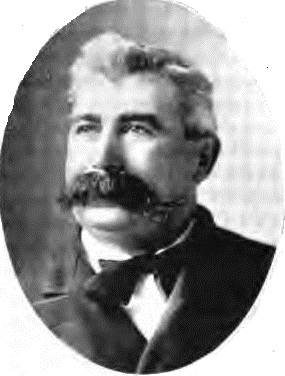
Patrick Gleason (1897)

Patrick Jerome "Paddy" "Battle-Axe" Gleason (April 25, 1844 – May 20, 1901) was an Irish-American politician born in County Tipperary, Ireland. He arrived in America with his brothers, fought in the Civil War, and made a small fortune in California. He got involved in local politics and was elected mayor of Long Island City three times, from 1887 to 1889, 1890–92 and served as its last mayor from 1896 to 1897, before it was incorporated into the City of Greater New York in 1898.

== Political life ==
Gleason held "truly remarkable sway over Long Island City's affairs" for years when his power was in its prime "by his keen personal hold on the majority of the people he ruled. By nature and by political preference he was a Democrat, but he was voted for simply as 'Paddy,' he was obeyed as 'Paddy,' and the people whom he had once autocratically governed, and a respectable portion of whom had been hostile to him, remembered him as 'Paddy' to the day of his death."

The growth of industry in Long Island City in the 1890s was accompanied by a growth of graft, and Gleason acted in Long Island City as Boss Tweed had decades earlier in Manhattan. As mayor, he owned trolley lines under city contract, leased personal property to the school district, and he formed the "Citizens Water Supply Co." and attempted to sell water to Long Island City from his wells. When the railroad installed a fence to block traffic on the ferry, he personally chopped it down, earning the nickname "Battle-Axe." Gleason's personality was legendary. Gleason's volatile temper got him arrested, and his relationship with the board of aldermen was tempestuous. The newspapers, which loathed him, refused to publish his photograph.

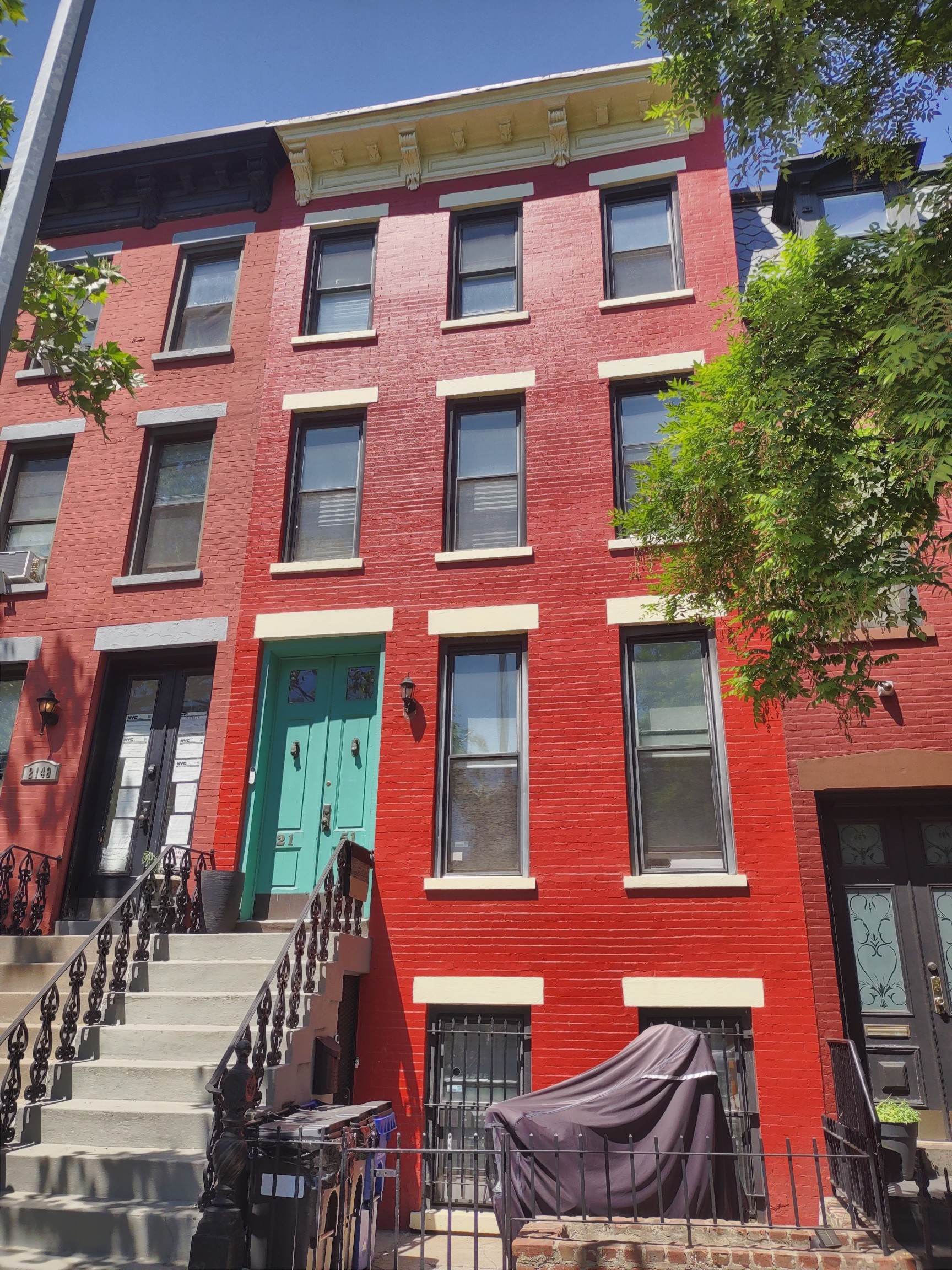
Gleason's home on 45th Avenue

When The New York Times printed an article detailing how Gleason had used to office of mayor to enrich himself, Gleason bought almost every newspaper printed to reduce the impact.

In 1890, Gleason drunkenly approached Associated Press reporter George B. Crowley in a hotel lobby and repeatedly insulted him, calling him a loafer and a thief. Crowley ignored Gleason at first and then replied that Crowley was not as much a loaf as Gleason. With that, Gleason punched Crowley in the face and kicked him repeatedly in the face. Bystanders took the bloodied Crowley into the hotel's restaurant. Crowley returned to the lobby to look for his eyeglasses, which had fallen off during the assault. Gleason grabbed him and threw him against a cigar stand, breaking the glass. Because Gleason was the mayor, police declined to arrest Gleason without a warrant from a judge. Gleason was eventually arrested and indicted for assault in the third degree. Gleason was convicted and sentenced to five days imprisonment in the county jail, with a fine of $250.

The following year, Gleason dislocated the shoulder of a man at a meeting of the Board of Health. Gleason was arrested and charged with assault in the second degree.

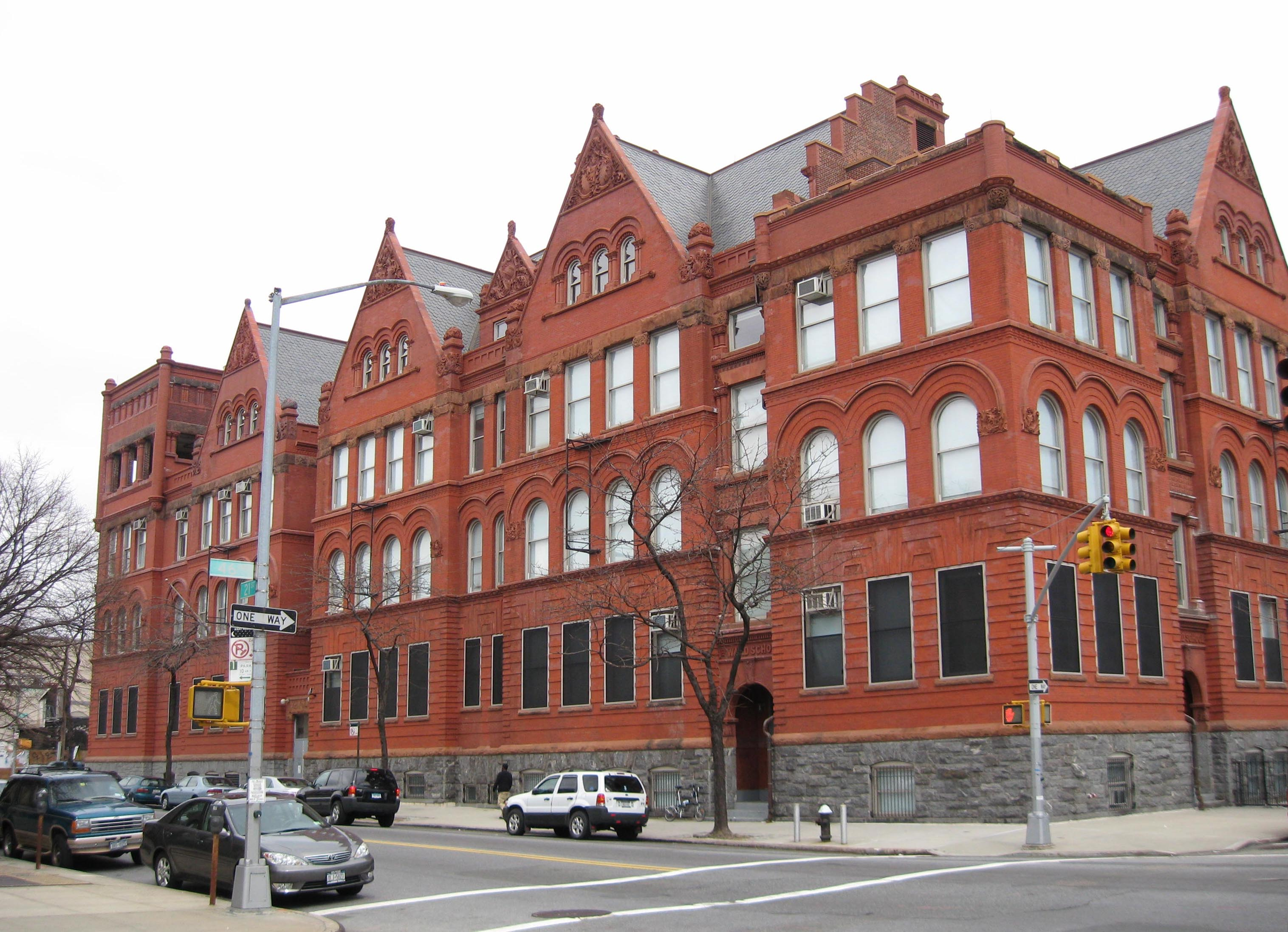
PS1, which was built during Gleason's tenure.

== Legacy ==
The school later called P.S. 1, the largest high school on Long Island when built, was Gleason's legacy to the community's children. When Gleason died bankrupt and discredited a few years out of office, hundreds lined the route to his interment in Calvary Cemetery.

Gleasonville, a former neighborhood in Woodside, Queens, north of Northern Boulevard, was named after him.
