= Virginia Onderdonk =

American philosopher

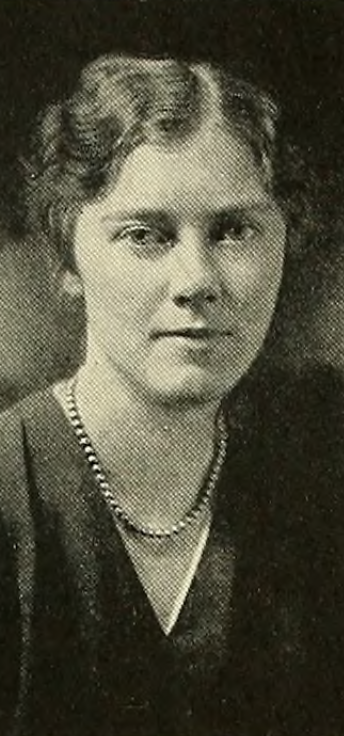
- Onderdonk, from the 1929 yearbook of Wellesley College
- Born: February 22, 1908; Evanston, Illinois, U.S.
- Died: August 1, 1994 (aged 86); Westwood, Massachusetts, U.S.
- Occupations: Philosopher, college professor, college dean

Virginia Onderdonk (February 22, 1908 – August 1, 1994) was an American philosopher, college professor and dean. She taught at Wellesley College from 1937 to 1973.

== Early life and education ==
Onderdonk was born in Evanston, Illinois, the daughter of William Holmes Onderdonk and Catherine Hamilton Onderdonk. Her father was a real estate executive in Chicago. She graduated from Deerfield High School in 1925, and from Wellesley College in 1929. She pursued graduate studies at the University of Chicago, and studied with Wittgenstein at Cambridge. At Wellesley she was president of the student government, and the campus May Queen in 1926.

== Career ==
Onderdonk returned to Wellesley College to teach philosophy, and became an assistant professor in 1939. She was named Alice Freeman Palmer Professor of Philosophy in 1957, served as dean of the college from 1964 to 1968, and retired in 1973. Richard Rorty recalled her as a helpful department chair and influential for his reading, when he was a young faculty member at Wellesley in the 1950s. She was a member of the Association for Symbolic Logic, the American Philosophical Association, and Phi Beta Kappa.

== Personal life and legacy ==
Onderdonk died in 1994, at the age of 86, in Westwood, Massachusetts. The Virginia Onderdonk Library, a book fund, and a professorship at Wellesley are named for her.
