= 169th New York State Legislature =

New York state legislative session

←	168th	170th	→
- New York State Capitol (2009)

Overview
- Legislative body: New York State Legislature
- Jurisdiction: New York, United States
- Term: January 1, 1953 – December 31, 1954

Senate
- Members: 56
- President: Lt. Gov. Frank C. Moore (R), until September 30, 1953
- Temporary President: Arthur H. Wicks (R), until November 18, 1953; Walter J. Mahoney (R), from November 18, 1953
- Party control: Republican (37–19)

Assembly
- Members: 150
- Speaker: Oswald D. Heck (R)
- Party control: Republican (97–53)

Sessions
- 1st: January 7 – March 21, 1953
- 2nd: November 17 – 18, 1953
- 3rd: January 6 – March 20, 1954
- 4th: June 10, 1954 –

The 169th New York State Legislature, consisting of the New York State Senate and the New York State Assembly, met from January 7, 1953, to June 10, 1954, during the eleventh and twelfth years of Thomas E. Dewey's governorship, in Albany.

== Background ==
Under the provisions of the New York Constitution of 1938, re-apportioned in 1943, 56 Senators and 150 assemblymen were elected in single-seat districts for two-year terms. The senatorial districts consisted either of one or more entire counties; or a contiguous area within a single county. The counties which were divided into more than one senatorial district were Kings (nine districts), New York (six), Bronx (five), Queens (four), Erie (three), Westchester (three), Monroe (two) and Nassau (two). The Assembly districts consisted either of a single entire county (except Hamilton Co.), or of contiguous area within one county.

At this time there were two major political parties: the Republican Party and the Democratic Party. The Liberal Party, the American Labor Party, the Socialist Workers Party, the Socialist Party and the Socialist Labor Party (running under the name of "Industrial Government Party") also nominated tickets.

== Elections ==
The 1952 New York state election was held on November 4. The only statewide elective office up for election was carried by the incumbent Republican U.S. Senator Irving M. Ives. The approximate party strength at this election, as expressed by the vote for U.S. Senator, was: Republicans 3,854,000; Democrats 2,522,000; Liberals 490,000; American Labor 105,000; Socialist Workers 4,300; Socialists 3,400; and Industrial Government 2,500.

All five women members of the previous legislature—Assemblywomen Mary A. Gillen (Dem.), of Brooklyn; Janet Hill Gordon (Rep.), a lawyer of Norwich; Genesta M. Strong (Rep.), of Plandome Heights; Mildred F. Taylor (Rep.), a coal dealer of Lyons; and Maude E. Ten Eyck (Rep.), of Manhattan—were re-elected. Ex-Assemblywoman Gladys E. Banks, of the Bronx, was again elected to the Assembly.

The 1953 New York state election was held on November 3. The only statewide elective office up for election was carried by the incumbent Chief Judge of the Court of Appeals Edmund H. Lewis who had been appointed temporarily to fill the vacancy caused by the death of John T. Loughran. Also, nine amendments to the State Constitution, among them one that required the voter to cast a single joint vote for the candidates for Governor and Lieutenant Governor on any ticket, were approved by the electorate. One vacancy in the State Senate and eight vacancies in the Assembly were filled.

Frances K. Marlatt, a lawyer of Mount Vernon, was elected to fill a vacancy in the Assembly, reaching again the number of seven women in the Assembly.

== Sessions ==
The Legislature met for the first regular session (the 176th) at the State Capitol in Albany on January 7, 1953; and adjourned on March 21.

Oswald D. Heck (Rep.) was re-elected Speaker.

Arthur H. Wicks (Rep.) was re-elected Temporary President of the State Senate. On September 30, 1953, Lt. Gov. Frank C. Moore (Rep.) resigned and on October 1, 1953, Wicks became Acting Lieutenant Governor.

The Legislature met for a special session at the State Capitol in Albany on November 17, 1953; and adjourned on the next day. The session was called to enact a new State Senate re-apportionment. On November 18, 1953, Wicks resigned as Temporary President, and Walter J. Mahoney was elected to succeed as Temporary President and Acting Lieutenant Governor.

The Legislature met for the second regular session (the 177th) at the State Capitol in Albany on January 6, 1954; and adjourned on March 20.

The Legislature met for another special session at the State Capitol in Albany on June 10, 1954; and adjourned on the same day. The session was called to enact legislation concerning the Long Island Rail Road, amendments to the new legislative re-apportionment, and the construction of the Moses-Saunders Power Dam.

The Legislature re-apportioned the Senate districts and the number of seats per county. The total number of senators was increased from 56 to 58; Bronx County lost one senatorial seat; and Nassau, Onondaga and Queens counties gained one senatorial seat each. Kings County lost two Assembly seats, and Albany and Bronx counties lost one seat each; Nassau County gained two seats, and Queens and Suffolk counties gained one seat each.

== State Senate ==
=== Districts ===
- 1st District: Suffolk County
- 2nd and 3rd District: Parts of Nassau County
- 4th, 5th, 6th and 7th District: Parts of Queens County, i.e. the Borough of Queens
- 8th, 9th, 10th, 11th, 12th, 13th, 14th, 15th and 16th District: Parts of Kings County, i.e. the Borough of Brooklyn
- 17th District: Richmond County, i.e. the Borough of Richmond (now the Borough of Staten Island)
- 18th, 19th, 20th, 21st, 22nd and 23rd District: Parts of New York County, i.e. the Borough of Manhattan
- 24th, 25th, 26th, 27th and 28th District: Parts of Bronx County, i.e. the Borough of the Bronx
- 29th, 30th and 31st District: Parts of Westchester County
- 32nd District: Orange and Rockland counties
- 33rd District: Columbia, Dutchess and Putnam counties
- 34th District: Delaware, Greene, Sullivan and Ulster counties
- 35th District: Albany County
- 36th District: Rensselaer and Saratoga counties
- 37th District: Montgomery and Schenectady counties
- 38th District: Clinton, Essex, Warren and Washington counties
- 39th District: St. Lawrence and Franklin counties
- 40th District: Fulton, Hamilton, Herkimer and Lewis counties
- 41st District: Oneida County
- 42nd District: Jefferson and Oswego counties
- 43rd District: Onondaga County
- 44th District: Chenango, Cortland, Madison, Otsego and Schoharie counties
- 45th District: Broome County
- 46th District: Chemung, Schuyler, Tioga and Tompkins counties
- 47th District: Cayuga, Seneca and Wayne counties
- 48th District: Ontario, Steuben and Yates counties
- 49th District: Allegany, Genesee, Livingston and Wyoming counties
- 50th and 51st District: Parts of Monroe County
- 52nd District: Niagara and Orleans counties
- 53rd, 54th and 55th District: Parts of Erie County
- 56th District: Cattaraugus and Chautauqua counties

=== Senators ===
The asterisk (*) denotes members of the previous Legislature who continued in office as members of this Legislature. Wheeler Milmoe changed from the Assembly to the Senate at the beginning of this Legislature. Assemblyman Edward P. Larkin was elected to fill a vacancy in the Senate.

Note: For brevity, the chairmanships omit the words "...the Committee on (the)..."

District	Senator	Party	Notes
1st	S. Wentworth Horton*	Republican	
2nd	John D. Bennett*	Republican	resigned to run for Surrogate of Nassau County
2nd	Edward P. Larkin*	Republican	on November 3, 1953, elected to fill vacancy
3rd	William S. Hults Jr.*	Republican	
4th	Seymour Halpern*	Republican	
5th	Milton Koerner	Republican	
6th	Bernard Tompkins	Republican	
7th	Carlo A. Lanzillotti	Republican	
8th	Thomas J. Cuite	Dem./Lib.	
9th	Harry Gittleson*	Dem./Lib.	
10th	Herbert I. Sorin*	Dem./Lib.	
11th	Fred G. Moritt*	Dem./Lib.	
12th	Samuel L. Greenberg*	Dem./Lib.	
13th	John F. Furey*	Dem./Lib.	
14th	Mario M. DeOptatis*	Dem./Lib.	
15th	Louis L. Friedman*	Dem./Lib.	
16th	William Rosenblatt*	Dem./Lib.	
17th	John G. Macdonald	Republican	
18th	Joseph R. Marro	Dem./Lib.	
19th	Francis J. Mahoney*	Dem./Lib.	Minority Leader
20th	MacNeil Mitchell*	Republican	
21st	Julius A. Archibald	Dem./Lib.	
22nd	Alfred E. Santangelo	Dem./Lib.	
23rd	Joseph Zaretzki*	Dem./Lib.	
24th	John J. Donovan Jr.*	Democrat	
25th	Arthur Wachtel*	Democrat	resigned on January 19, 1954, appointed to the Municipal Court
26th	Nathaniel T. Helman*	Democrat	
27th	Joseph F. Periconi	Republican	
28th	Francis J. McCaffrey*	Democrat	
29th	William F. Condon*	Republican	
30th	Frank S. McCullough*	Republican	
31st	Pliny W. Williamson*	Republican	Chairman of Judiciary
32nd	Thomas C. Desmond*	Republican	
33rd	Ernest I. Hatfield*	Republican	
34th	Arthur H. Wicks*	Republican	re-elected Temporary President; on November 18, 1953, resigned as Temporary President
35th	Peter J. Dalessandro*	Dem./Lib.	
36th	Gilbert T. Seelye*	Republican	
37th	Thomas F. Campbell*	Rep./Dem.	
38th	Henry Neddo*	Republican	
39th	Paul D. Graves*	Republican	on November 27, 1953, appointed to the New York Supreme Court
39th	Robert C. McEwen	Republican	on January 5, 1954, elected to fill vacancy
40th	Walter Van Wiggeren*	Republican	
41st	Fred J. Rath*	Republican	
42nd	Henry A. Wise*	Republican	
43rd	John H. Hughes*	Republican	
44th	Wheeler Milmoe*	Rep./Dem.	
45th	Warren M. Anderson	Republican	
46th	Dutton Peterson	Rep./Dem.	
47th	George R. Metcalf*	Republican	
48th	Harry K. Morton	Republican	
49th	Austin W. Erwin*	Republican	Chairman of Finance, from November 18, 1953
50th	George T. Manning*	Republican	
51st	Frank E. Van Lare*	Republican	
52nd	Earl W. Brydges*	Republican	
53rd	Walter J. Mahoney*	Republican	Chairman of Finance, until November 18, 1953; on November 18, 1953, elected Temporary President
54th	Stanley J. Bauer*	Rep./Lib.	
55th	John H. Cooke*	Republican	
56th	George H. Pierce*	Republican	

=== Employees ===
- Secretary: William S. King

== State Assembly ==
=== Assemblymen ===
Note: For brevity, the chairmanships omit the words "...the Committee on (the)..."

District		Assemblymen	Party	Notes
Albany	1st	D-Cady Herrick 2nd*	Dem./Lib.	
Albany	2nd	James J. McGuiness*	Dem./Lib.	
Albany	3rd	John W. Tabner	Republican	
Allegany		William H. MacKenzie*	Republican	Chairman of Ways and Means
Bronx	1st	Bernard C. McDonnell*	Democrat	
Bronx	2nd	Sidney H. Asch	Democrat	
Bronx	3rd	Edward T. Galloway*	Democrat	resigned on May 12, 1953, appointed as a City Magistrate
Bronx	3rd	Morris Mohr	Democrat	on November 3, 1953, elected to fill vacancy
Bronx	4th	Jacob H. Gilbert*	Democrat	
Bronx	5th	David Ross*	Democrat	resigned on July 23, 1953, to run for the City Council
Bronx	5th	Felipe N. Torres	Democrat	on November 3, 1953, elected to fill vacancy
Bronx	6th	Julius J. Gans*	Democrat	
Bronx	7th	Louis Peck*	Democrat	resigned on July 21, 1953
Bronx	7th	Walter H. Gladwin	Democrat	on November 3, 1953, elected to fill vacancy
Bronx	8th	John T. Satriale*	Democrat	
Bronx	9th	George W. Harrington	Republican	
Bronx	10th	Thomas E. Ferrandina	Republican	
Bronx	11th	Gladys E. Banks	Republican	
Bronx	12th	Mitchell J. Sherwin*	Democrat	
Bronx	13th	William Kapelman*	Democrat	
Broome	1st	Richard H. Knauf*	Republican	
Broome	2nd	George L. Ingalls	Republican	
Cattaraugus		Leo P. Noonan*	Republican	
Cayuga		Charles A. Cusick*	Republican	
Chautauqua		E. Herman Magnuson*	Republican	
Chemung		Harry J. Tifft*	Republican	
Chenango		Janet Hill Gordon*	Rep./Dem.	
Clinton		James A. FitzPatrick*	Republican	
Columbia		Willard C. Drumm*	Republican	
Cortland		Louis H. Folmer*	Republican	
Delaware		Edwyn E. Mason	Republican	
Dutchess		Robert Watson Pomeroy*	Republican	
Erie	1st	Thomas J. Runfola*	Republican	
Erie	2nd	Justin C. Morgan*	Republican	Chairman of Judiciary
Erie	3rd	William J. Butler*	Republican	
Erie	4th	Frank J. Caffery*	Democrat	
Erie	5th	Philip V. Baczkowski*	Democrat	resigned on January 5, 1954
Erie	5th	John B. Lis	Democrat	on February 16, 1954, elected to fill vacancy
Erie	6th	George F. Dannebrock*	Republican	
Erie	7th	Julius Volker*	Republican	
Erie	8th	William Sadler*	Republican	
Essex		Grant W. Johnson*	Republican	
Franklin		Robert G. Main*	Republican	
Fulton and Hamilton		Joseph R. Younglove*	Republican	
Genesee		John E. Johnson*	Republican	
Greene		William E. Brady*	Republican	
Herkimer		Leo A. Lawrence*	Republican	
Jefferson		Orin S. Wilcox*	Republican	
Kings	1st	Max M. Turshen*	Democrat	
Kings	2nd	J. Sidney Levine*	Democrat	
Kings	3rd	Mary A. Gillen*	Democrat	
Kings	4th	Bernard Austin*	Democrat	
Kings	5th	Harry Morr*	Democrat	resigned on December 24, 1953
Kings	5th	John A. Monteleone	Democrat	on February 16, 1954, elected to fill vacancy
Kings	6th	John J. Ryan*	Democrat	
Kings	7th	Louis Kalish*	Democrat	
Kings	8th	Frank Composto*	Democrat	
Kings	9th	Frank J. McMullen*	Republican	
Kings	10th	Lewis W. Olliffe*	Republican	
Kings	11th	Eugene F. Bannigan*	Democrat	Minority Leader
Kings	12th	Herbert Samuels*	Democrat	
Kings	13th	Lawrence P. Murphy*	Democrat	
Kings	14th	Edward S. Lentol*	Democrat	
Kings	15th	John Smolenski*	Democrat	died on May 31, 1953
Kings	15th	James J. Amelia	Democrat	on November 3, 1953, elected to fill vacancy
Kings	16th	Frank J. Pino*	Democrat	
Kings	17th	Bertram L. Baker*	Democrat	
Kings	18th	Stanley Steingut	Democrat	
Kings	19th	Philip J. Schupler*	Democrat	resigned on December 28, 1953
Kings	19th	Frank S. Samansky	Democrat	on February 16, 1954, elected to fill vacancy
Kings	20th	Joseph R. Corso*	Democrat	
Kings	21st	Thomas A. Dwyer*	Democrat	
Kings	22nd	Anthony J. Travia*	Democrat	
Kings	23rd	Alfred A. Lama*	Democrat	
Kings	24th	Ben Werbel*	Democrat	
Lewis		Benjamin H. Demo*	Republican	
Livingston		Joseph W. Ward*	Republican	
Madison		Harold I. Tyler	Republican	
Monroe	1st	J. Eugene Goddard*	Republican	
Monroe	2nd	A. Gould Hatch*	Republican	
Monroe	3rd	Paul B. Hanks Jr.	Republican	
Monroe	4th	Thomas F. Riley	Republican	
Montgomery		Donald A. Campbell*	Republican	
Nassau	1st	Edward P. Larkin	Republican	resigned on July 7, 1953, to run for the State Senate
Nassau	1st	John G. Herrmann	Republican	on November 3, 1953, elected to fill vacancy
Nassau	2nd	Joseph F. Carlino*	Republican	
Nassau	3rd	Genesta M. Strong*	Republican	
Nassau	4th	John J. Burns*	Republican	
New York	1st	Maude E. Ten Eyck*	Republican	
New York	2nd	Louis DeSalvio*	Democrat	
New York	3rd	John J. Mangan*	Democrat	
New York	4th	Leonard Farbstein*	Democrat	
New York	5th	Ludwig Teller*	Democrat	
New York	6th	Irving Kirschenbaum	Democrat	
New York	7th	Daniel M. Kelly*	Democrat	
New York	8th	Archibald Douglas Jr.*	Republican	
New York	9th	John R. Brook*	Republican	
New York	10th	Herman Katz*	Democrat	
New York	11th	James C. Thomas	Democrat	
New York	12th	Leslie T. Turner	Democrat	
New York	13th	Orest V. Maresca*	Democrat	
New York	14th	Hulan E. Jack*	Democrat	resigned to run for Borough President of Manhattan
New York	14th	Kenneth M. Phipps	Democrat	on February 16, 1954, elected to fill vacancy
New York	15th	Samuel Roman*	Republican	
New York	16th	Louis A. Cioffi*	Democrat	
Niagara	1st	Jacob E. Hollinger*	Republican	
Niagara	2nd	Ernest Curto*	Republican	
Oneida	1st	Francis J. Alder*	Republican	
Oneida	2nd	William S. Calli*	Republican	
Onondaga	1st	Searles G. Shultz*	Republican	
Onondaga	2nd	Donald H. Mead*	Republican	on November 3, 1953, elected Mayor of Syracuse
Onondaga	2nd	The seat remained vacant throughout the session of 1954		
Onondaga	3rd	Lawrence M. Rulison*	Republican	
Ontario		Thompson M. Scoon*	Republican	died on July 27, 1953
Ontario		Robert M. Quigley	Republican	on November 3, 1953, elected to fill vacancy
Orange	1st	Lee B. Mailler*	Republican	Majority Leader
Orange	2nd	Wilson C. Van Duzer*	Republican	
Orleans		Alonzo L. Waters*	Republican	
Oswego		Henry D. Coville*	Republican	
Otsego		Paul L. Talbot*	Republican	
Putnam		Willis H. Stephens	Republican	
Queens	1st	Thomas V. LaFauci*	Democrat	
Queens	2nd	Edward J. Riley	Republican	
Queens	3rd	Martin J. Knorr	Republican	
Queens	4th	Thomas A. Duffy*	Democrat	
Queens	5th	William G. Giaccio*	Democrat	
Queens	6th	Vincent L. Pitaro	Republican	
Queens	7th	Anthony P. Savarese Jr.*	Republican	
Queens	8th	Samuel Rabin*	Republican	on November 2, 1954, elected to the New York Supreme Court
Queens	9th	Fred W. Preller*	Republican	
Queens	10th	Angelo Graci*	Republican	
Queens	11th	Thomas Fitzpatrick*	Democrat	
Queens	12th	J. Lewis Fox*	Democrat	
Rensselaer		Thomas H. Brown*	Republican	
Richmond	1st	Edward J. Amann Jr.	Republican	
Richmond	2nd	Lucio F. Russo	Republican	
Rockland		Robert Walmsley*	Republican	
St. Lawrence		Allan P. Sill*	Republican	
Saratoga		John L. Ostrander*	Republican	
Schenectady		Oswald D. Heck*	Republican	re-elected Speaker
Schoharie		David Enders	Republican	
Schuyler		Jerry W. Black*	Republican	
Seneca		Lawrence W. Van Cleef*	Republican	
Steuben		John D. Young	Republican	
Suffolk	1st	Edmund R. Lupton*	Republican	
Suffolk	2nd	Elisha T. Barrett*	Republican	
Sullivan		Hyman E. Mintz*	Republican	
Tioga		Richard C. Lounsberry	Republican	
Tompkins		Ray S. Ashbery*	Republican	
Ulster		John F. Wadlin*	Republican	died on April 30, 1953
Ulster		Kenneth L. Wilson	Republican	on November 3, 1953, elected to fill vacancy
Warren		Stuart F. Hawley*	Republican	
Washington		William J. Reid*	Republican	
Wayne		Mildred F. Taylor*	Republican	
Westchester	1st	Malcolm Wilson*	Republican	
Westchester	2nd	Edward H. Innet*	Republican	
Westchester	3rd	Harold D. Toomey*	Republican	died on March 11, 1953
Westchester	3rd	Frances K. Marlatt	Republican	on November 3, 1953, elected to fill vacancy
Westchester	4th	Hunter Meighan*	Republican	
Westchester	5th	William F. Horan	Republican	
Westchester	6th	Theodore Hill Jr.*	Republican	
Wyoming		Harold L. Peet*	Republican	
Yates		Vernon W. Blodgett*	Republican	

=== Employees ===
- Clerk: Ansley B. Borkowski
- Sergeant-at-Arms: Herbert A. Bartholomew

== Sources ==
- These Are Your N.Y. State Senators And Assemblymen, with Addresses in Civil Service Leader (January 27, 1953, Vol. XIV, No. 20, pg. 4f)
- Members of the New York Senate (1950s) at Political Graveyard
- Members of the New York Assembly (1950s) at Political Graveyard
