= 168th New York State Legislature =

New York state legislative session

←	167th	169th	→
- New York State Capitol (2009)

Overview
- Legislative body: New York State Legislature
- Jurisdiction: New York, United States
- Term: January 1, 1951 – December 31, 1952

Senate
- Members: 56
- President: Lt. Gov. Frank C. Moore (R)
- Temporary President: Arthur H. Wicks (R)
- Party control: Republican (33–23)

Assembly
- Members: 150
- Speaker: Oswald D. Heck (R)
- Party control: Republican (87–63)

Sessions
- 1st: January 3 – March 16, 1951
- 2nd: December 6, 1951 –
- 3rd: January 9 – March 20, 1952

The 168th New York State Legislature, consisting of the New York State Senate and the New York State Assembly, met from January 3, 1951, to March 20, 1952, during the ninth and tenth years of Thomas E. Dewey's governorship, in Albany.

== Background ==
Under the provisions of the New York Constitution of 1938, re-apportioned in 1943, 56 Senators and 150 assemblymen were elected in single-seat districts for two-year terms. The senatorial districts consisted either of one or more entire counties; or a contiguous area within a single county. The counties which were divided into more than one senatorial district were Kings (nine districts), New York (six), Bronx (five), Queens (four), Erie (three), Westchester (three), Monroe (two) and Nassau (two). The Assembly districts consisted either of a single entire county (except Hamilton Co.), or of contiguous area within one county.

At this time there were two major political parties: the Republican Party and the Democratic Party. The Liberal Party, the American Labor Party, the Socialist Workers Party, and the Socialist Labor Party (running under the name of "Industrial Government Party") also nominated tickets.

== Elections ==
The 1950 New York state election was held on November 7. Governor Thomas E. Dewey (Rep.) was re-elected. New York State Comptroller Frank C. Moore (Rep.) was elected lieutenant governor. Of the other three statewide elective offices up for election, two were carried by the Republicans. The Democratic/Liberal incumbent U.S. Senator Herbert H. Lehman defeated his Republican challenger lieutenant governor Joe R. Hanley. The approximate party strength at this election, as expressed by the vote for governor, was: Republicans 2,820,000; Democrats 1,981,000; Liberals 266,000; American Labor 222,000; Socialist Workers 13,000; and Industrial Government 7,000.

Five of the seven women members of the previous legislature—Assemblywomen Mary A. Gillen (Dem.), of Brooklyn; Janet Hill Gordon (Rep.), a lawyer of Norwich; Genesta M. Strong (Rep.), of Plandome Heights; Mildred F. Taylor (Rep.), a coal dealer of Lyons; and Maude E. Ten Eyck (Rep.), of Manhattan—were re-elected.

The 1951 New York state election was held on November 6. No statewide elective offices were up for election. Four vacancies in the Assembly were filled.

== Sessions ==
The Legislature met for the first regular session (the 174th) at the State Capitol in Albany on January 3, 1951; and adjourned on March 16.

Oswald D. Heck (Rep.) was re-elected Speaker.

Arthur H. Wicks (Rep.) was re-elected Temporary President of the State Senate.

The Legislature met for a special session at the State Capitol in Albany on December 6, 1951, to enact the re-apportionment of congressional seats according to the 1950 U.S. census.

The Legislature met for the second regular session (the 175th) at the State Capitol in Albany on January 9, 1952; and adjourned on March 20.

== State Senate ==
=== Districts ===
- 1st District: Suffolk County
- 2nd and 3rd District: Parts of Nassau County
- 4th, 5th, 6th and 7th District: Parts of Queens County, i.e. the Borough of Queens
- 8th, 9th, 10th, 11th, 12th, 13th, 14th, 15th and 16th District: Parts of Kings County, i.e. the Borough of Brooklyn
- 17th District: Richmond County, i.e. the Borough of Richmond (now the Borough of Staten Island)
- 18th, 19th, 20th, 21st, 22nd and 23rd District: Parts of New York County, i.e. the Borough of Manhattan
- 24th, 25th, 26th, 27th and 28th District: Parts of Bronx County, i.e. the Borough of the Bronx
- 29th, 30th and 31st District: Parts of Westchester County
- 32nd District: Orange and Rockland counties
- 33rd District: Columbia, Dutchess and Putnam counties
- 34th District: Delaware, Greene, Sullivan and Ulster counties
- 35th District: Albany County
- 36th District: Rensselaer and Saratoga counties
- 37th District: Montgomery and Schenectady counties
- 38th District: Clinton, Essex, Warren and Washington counties
- 39th District: St. Lawrence and Franklin counties
- 40th District: Fulton, Hamilton, Herkimer and Lewis counties
- 41st District: Oneida County
- 42nd District: Jefferson and Oswego counties
- 43rd District: Onondaga County
- 44th District: Chenango, Cortland, Madison, Otsego and Schoharie counties
- 45th District: Broome County
- 46th District: Chemung, Schuyler, Tioga and Tompkins counties
- 47th District: Cayuga, Seneca and Wayne counties
- 48th District: Ontario, Steuben and Yates counties
- 49th District: Allegany, Genesee, Livingston and Wyoming counties
- 50th and 51st District: Parts of Monroe County
- 52nd District: Niagara and Orleans counties
- 53rd, 54th and 55th District: Parts of Erie County
- 56th District: Cattaraugus and Chautauqua counties

=== Senators ===
The asterisk (*) denotes members of the previous Legislature who continued in office as members of this Legislature. Frank S. McCullough changed from the Assembly to the Senate at the beginning of this Legislature. Assemblyman Orlo M. Brees was elected to fill a vacancy in the Senate.

Note: For brevity, the chairmanships omit the words "...the Committee on (the)..."

District	Senator	Party	Notes
1st	S. Wentworth Horton*	Republican	
2nd	John D. Bennett*	Republican	
3rd	William S. Hults Jr.*	Republican	
4th	Seymour Halpern*	Republican	
5th	James F. Fitzgerald*	Democrat	
6th	Frank D. O'Connor*	Democrat	
7th	William N. Conrad*	Democrat	
8th	James J. Crawford*	Democrat	
9th	Harry Gittleson*	Democrat	
10th	Herbert I. Sorin*	Democrat	
11th	Fred G. Moritt*	Democrat	
12th	Samuel L. Greenberg*	Democrat	
13th	John F. Furey*	Democrat	
14th	Mario M. DeOptatis*	Democrat	
15th	Louis L. Friedman*	Democrat	
16th	William Rosenblatt*	Democrat	
17th	John M. Braisted Jr.*	Democrat	
18th	Elmer F. Quinn*	Democrat	Minority Leader; died on September 2, 1952
19th	Francis J. Mahoney*	Democrat	on September 12, 1952, chosen Minority Leader
20th	MacNeil Mitchell*	Republican	
21st	Harold I. Panken*	Democrat	
22nd	William J. Bianchi	Rep./Am. Labor	
23rd	Joseph Zaretzki*	Democrat	
24th	John J. Donovan Jr.	Democrat	
25th	Arthur Wachtel*	Democrat	
26th	Nathaniel T. Helman*	Democrat	
27th	Enzo Gaspari	Democrat	
28th	Francis J. McCaffrey	Democrat	
29th	William F. Condon*	Republican	
30th	Frank S. McCullough*	Republican	
31st	Pliny W. Williamson*	Republican	Chairman of Judiciary
32nd	Thomas C. Desmond*	Republican	
33rd	Ernest I. Hatfield*	Republican	
34th	Arthur H. Wicks*	Republican	re-elected Temporary President
35th	Peter J. Dalessandro*	Democrat	
36th	Gilbert T. Seelye*	Republican	
37th	Thomas F. Campbell*	Republican	
38th	Henry Neddo*	Republican	
39th	Paul D. Graves*	Republican	
40th	Walter Van Wiggeren*	Republican	Chairman of Affairs of Villages
41st	Fred J. Rath	Republican	
42nd	Henry A. Wise*	Republican	Chairman of Public Relief and Welfare
43rd	John H. Hughes*	Republican	
44th	Walter W. Stokes*	Republican	
45th	Floyd E. Anderson*	Republican	on January 3, 1952, appointed to the New York Supreme Court
45th	Orlo M. Brees*	Republican	on February 13, 1952, elected to fill vacancy; took his seat on February 18, 1952
46th	Chauncey B. Hammond*	Republican	died on February 11, 1952
47th	George R. Metcalf	Republican	
48th	Fred S. Hollowell*	Republican	
49th	Austin W. Erwin*	Republican	
50th	George T. Manning*	Republican	
51st	Frank E. Van Lare	Republican	
52nd	Earl W. Brydges*	Republican	
53rd	Walter J. Mahoney*	Republican	Chairman of Finance
54th	Stanley J. Bauer	Republican	
55th	John H. Cooke	Republican	
56th	George H. Pierce*	Republican	

=== Employees ===
- Secretary: William S. King

== State Assembly ==
=== Assemblymen ===
Note: For brevity, the chairmanships omit the words "...the Committee on (the)..."

District		Assemblymen	Party	Notes
Albany	1st	D-Cady Herrick 2nd*	Democrat	
Albany	2nd	James J. McGuiness	Democrat	
Albany	3rd	James F. Dillon*	Democrat	
Allegany		William H. MacKenzie*	Republican	
Bronx	1st	Bernard C. McDonnell*	Democrat	
Bronx	2nd	Richard M. Goldwater*	Democrat	
Bronx	3rd	Edward T. Galloway*	Democrat	
Bronx	4th	Jacob H. Gilbert	Democrat	
Bronx	5th	David Ross	Democrat	
Bronx	6th	Julius J. Gans*	Democrat	
Bronx	7th	Louis Peck*	Democrat	
Bronx	8th	John T. Satriale*	Democrat	
Bronx	9th	James J. O'Brien	Democrat	
Bronx	10th	Charles H. McHugh	Democrat	
Bronx	11th	Clarke S. Ryan	Democrat	
Bronx	12th	Nathan A. Lashin*	Democrat	on July 31, 1951, appointed to the Municipal Court
Bronx	12th	Mitchell J. Sherwin	Democrat	on November 6, 1951, elected to fill vacancy
Bronx	13th	William Kapelman	Democrat	
Broome	1st	Richard H. Knauf*	Republican	
Broome	2nd	Orlo M. Brees*	Republican	on February 13, 1952, elected to the State Senate
Cattaraugus		Leo P. Noonan*	Republican	
Cayuga		Charles A. Cusick*	Republican	
Chautauqua		E. Herman Magnuson*	Republican	
Chemung		Harry J. Tifft*	Republican	
Chenango		Janet Hill Gordon*	Republican	
Clinton		James A. FitzPatrick*	Republican	
Columbia		Willard C. Drumm*	Republican	
Cortland		Louis H. Folmer	Republican	
Delaware		Elmer J. Kellam*	Republican	
Dutchess		Robert Watson Pomeroy*	Republican	
Erie	1st	Thomas J. Runfola	Republican	
Erie	2nd	Justin C. Morgan*	Republican	Chairman of Judiciary
Erie	3rd	William J. Butler*	Republican	
Erie	4th	Frank J. Caffery*	Democrat	
Erie	5th	Philip V. Baczkowski*	Dem./Lib.	
Erie	6th	George F. Dannebrock*	Republican	Chairman of Commerce and Navigation
Erie	7th	Julius Volker*	Republican	
Erie	8th	William Sadler	Republican	
Essex		L. Judson Morhouse*	Republican	resigned to become Exec. Dir. of the NY Good Roads Association
Essex		Grant W. Johnson	Republican	on November 6, 1951, elected to fill vacancy
Franklin		Robert G. Main	Republican	
Fulton and Hamilton		Joseph R. Younglove*	Republican	
Genesee		John E. Johnson*	Republican	
Greene		William E. Brady*	Republican	
Herkimer		Leo A. Lawrence*	Republican	
Jefferson		Orin S. Wilcox*	Republican	
Kings	1st	Max M. Turshen*	Democrat	
Kings	2nd	J. Sidney Levine*	Democrat	
Kings	3rd	Mary A. Gillen*	Democrat	
Kings	4th	Bernard Austin*	Dem./Lib.	
Kings	5th	Harry Morr*	Democrat	
Kings	6th	John J. Ryan*	Democrat	
Kings	7th	Louis Kalish*	Democrat	
Kings	8th	Frank Composto*	Democrat	
Kings	9th	Frank J. McMullen*	Republican	
Kings	10th	Lewis W. Olliffe*	Republican	
Kings	11th	Eugene F. Bannigan*	Democrat	
Kings	12th	James W. Feely*	Democrat	resigned to run for the Municipal Court
Kings	12th	Herbert Samuels	Democrat	on November 6, 1951, elected to fill vacancy
Kings	13th	Lawrence P. Murphy*	Democrat	
Kings	14th	Edward S. Lentol*	Democrat	
Kings	15th	John Smolenski*	Democrat	
Kings	16th	Frank J. Pino*	Democrat	
Kings	17th	Bertram L. Baker*	Democrat	
Kings	18th	Irwin Steingut*	Democrat	Minority Leader; died on September 26, 1952
Kings	19th	Philip J. Schupler*	Democrat	
Kings	20th	Joseph R. Corso*	Democrat	
Kings	21st	Thomas A. Dwyer*	Democrat	
Kings	22nd	Anthony J. Travia*	Democrat	
Kings	23rd	Alfred A. Lama*	Democrat	
Kings	24th	Ben Werbel*	Democrat	
Lewis		Benjamin H. Demo*	Republican	Chairman of Banks
Livingston		Joseph W. Ward*	Republican	
Madison		Wheeler Milmoe*	Republican	
Monroe	1st	J. Eugene Goddard*	Republican	
Monroe	2nd	A. Gould Hatch*	Republican	
Monroe	3rd	Raymond H. Combs*	Republican	
Monroe	4th	Andrew J. Schell	Republican	
Montgomery		Donald A. Campbell	Republican	
Nassau	1st	Frank J. Becker*	Republican	on November 4, 1952, elected to the 83rd U.S. Congress
Nassau	2nd	Joseph F. Carlino*	Republican	
Nassau	3rd	Genesta M. Strong*	Republican	
Nassau	4th	David S. Hill Jr.*	Republican	resigned on October 6, 1951
Nassau	4th	John J. Burns	Republican	on November 6, 1951, elected to fill vacancy
New York	1st	Maude E. Ten Eyck*	Republican	
New York	2nd	Louis DeSalvio*	Democrat	
New York	3rd	John J. Mangan	Democrat	
New York	4th	Leonard Farbstein*	Democrat	
New York	5th	Ludwig Teller	Democrat	
New York	6th	Francis X. McGowan*	Democrat	
New York	7th	Daniel M. Kelly	Democrat	
New York	8th	Archibald Douglas Jr.*	Republican	
New York	9th	John R. Brook*	Republican	
New York	10th	Herman Katz*	Democrat	
New York	11th	Joseph Pinckney	Democrat	
New York	12th	Elijah Crump*	Democrat	
New York	13th	Orest V. Maresca	Democrat	
New York	14th	Hulan E. Jack*	Democrat	
New York	15th	Samuel Roman*	Republican	
New York	16th	Louis A. Cioffi*	Democrat	
Niagara	1st	Jacob E. Hollinger*	Republican	
Niagara	2nd	Ernest Curto*	Republican	
Oneida	1st	Francis J. Alder	Republican	
Oneida	2nd	William S. Calli	Republican	
Onondaga	1st	Searles G. Shultz*	Republican	
Onondaga	2nd	Donald H. Mead*	Republican	
Onondaga	3rd	Lawrence M. Rulison*	Republican	
Ontario		Thompson M. Scoon	Republican	
Orange	1st	Lee B. Mailler*	Republican	Majority Leader
Orange	2nd	Wilson C. Van Duzer*	Republican	
Orleans		Alonzo L. Waters*	Republican	
Oswego		Henry D. Coville*	Republican	
Otsego		Paul L. Talbot*	Republican	Chairman of Canals and Waterways
Putnam		D. Mallory Stephens*	Republican	Chairman of Ways and Means
Queens	1st	Alexander Del Giorno*	Democrat	on January 1, 1952, appointed as a City Magistrate
Queens	1st	Thomas V. LaFauci	Democrat	on February 19, 1952, elected to fill vacancy
Queens	2nd	William E. Clancy*	Democrat	
Queens	3rd	Anthony R. Carus*	Democrat	
Queens	4th	Thomas A. Duffy*	Democrat	
Queens	5th	William G. Giaccio*	Democrat	
Queens	6th	William F. Bowe*	Democrat	
Queens	7th	Anthony P. Savarese Jr.*	Republican	
Queens	8th	Samuel Rabin*	Republican	
Queens	9th	Fred W. Preller*	Republican	
Queens	10th	Angelo Graci*	Republican	
Queens	11th	Thomas Fitzpatrick*	Democrat	
Queens	12th	J. Lewis Fox*	Democrat	
Rensselaer		Thomas H. Brown*	Republican	
Richmond	1st	William N. Reidy*	Democrat	
Richmond	2nd	Edward V. Curry*	Democrat	
Rockland		Robert Walmsley*	Republican	
St. Lawrence		Allan P. Sill*	Republican	
Saratoga		John L. Ostrander*	Republican	
Schenectady		Oswald D. Heck*	Republican	re-elected Speaker
Schoharie		Sharon J. Mauhs*	Dem./Lib.	
Schuyler		Jerry W. Black*	Republican	
Seneca		Lawrence W. Van Cleef*	Republican	
Steuben		William M. Stuart*	Republican	
Suffolk	1st	Edmund R. Lupton*	Republican	
Suffolk	2nd	Elisha T. Barrett*	Republican	
Sullivan		Hyman E. Mintz	Republican	
Tioga		Myron D. Albro*	Republican	
Tompkins		Ray S. Ashbery*	Republican	
Ulster		John F. Wadlin*	Republican	
Warren		Stuart F. Hawley	Republican	
Washington		William J. Reid*	Republican	
Wayne		Mildred F. Taylor*	Republican	
Westchester	1st	Malcolm Wilson*	Republican	
Westchester	2nd	Edward H. Innet	Republican	
Westchester	3rd	Harold D. Toomey*	Republican	
Westchester	4th	Hunter Meighan	Republican	
Westchester	5th	Samuel Faile*	Republican	
Westchester	6th	Theodore Hill Jr.*	Republican	Chairman of Internal Affairs
Wyoming		Harold L. Peet	Republican	
Yates		Vernon W. Blodgett*	Republican	

=== Employees ===
- Clerk: Ansley B. Borkowski
- Sergeant-at-Arms: Herbert A. Bartholomew

== Sources ==
- Members of the New York Senate (1950s) at Political Graveyard
- Members of the New York Assembly (1950s) at Political Graveyard
