= James F. Fitzgerald =

American politician

James Francis Fitzgerald (October 12, 1895 – March 1975) was an American politician from New York.

== Life ==
He was born on October 12, 1895, in Long Island City, which was then a city in Queens County, and is now a neighborhood in the Borough of Queens in New York City. He attended St. Mary's Parochial School.

Fitzgerald was a member of the New York State Senate (5th D.) from 1949 to 1952, sitting in the 167th and 168th New York State Legislatures. In November 1952, he ran for re-election, but was defeated by Republican Milton Koerner.

He died in March 1975.

New York State Senate
Preceded by Frederic E. Hammer	New York State Senate; 5th District; 1949–1952	Succeeded by Milton Koerner
