= Senator McCaffrey =

Senator McCaffrey may refer to:

- Francis J. McCaffrey Jr. (1902–1972), New York State Senate
- Francis J. McCaffrey (1917–1989), New York State Senate
- Michael McCaffrey (born 1963), Rhode Island State Senate
