= Edward P. Larkin =

American politician

Edward Paul Larkin (June 1, 1915 – August 30, 1986) was an American politician from New York.

== Life ==
He was born on June 1, 1915, in Brooklyn, New York City. He attended Hempstaed High School and Sewanhaka High School. He attended St. John's University for two years but did not graduate. Then he worked on construction sites. He was Executive Secretary to the Town of Hempstead Zoning Board from 1942 to 1952. During World War II he served in the U.S. Army as an army engineer. After the war, he entered politics as a Republican. He married Grace Marie Miller (died 1983), and they had six children.

He was a member of the New York State Assembly (Nassau Co., 1st D.) in 1953. He resigned his seat on July 7, 1953, to run for the State Senate seat vacated by the resignation of John D. Bennett. Larkin was a member of the New York State Senate (2nd D.) in 1954 and 1955. He resigned his seat on September 16, 1955, to run for Presiding Supervisor of the Town of Hempstead.

He was Presiding Supervisor of the Town of Hempstead from 1956 to 1961. On June 22, 1961, he was appointed by Gov. Nelson Rockefeller to the New York Public Service Commission. He was re-appointed several times and remained in office until his death in 1986. After the death of his first wife, he married Eleanor Isacsen.

He died on August 30, 1986, in Albany Medical Center in Albany, New York, of lung disease.

== Sources ==
New York State Assembly
| Preceded by Frank J. Becker | New York State Assembly; Nassau County, 1st District; 1953 | Succeeded by John G. Herrmann |
New York State Senate
| Preceded by John D. Bennett | New York State Senate; 2nd District; 1954–1955 | Succeeded by Daniel G. Albert |
