= Senator Albert =

Senator Albert may refer to:

- Daniel G. Albert (1901–1983), New York State Senate
- Thomas Albert (politician) (born 1985), Michigan State Senate
