= Seymour Halpern =

American politician (1913–1997)

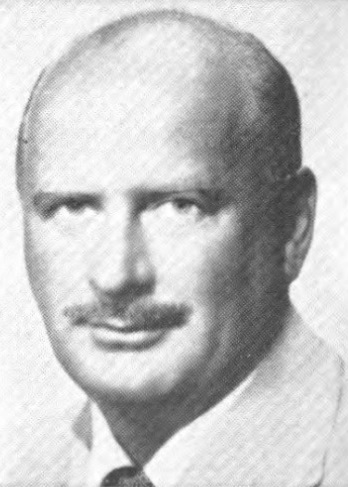
- From 1969's Pocket Congressional Directory of the Ninety-First Congress.

Member of the U.S. House of Representatives from New York
- In office January 3, 1959 – January 3, 1973
- Preceded by: Henry J. Latham
- Succeeded by: Lester L. Wolff
- Constituency: 4th district (1959–63); 6th district (1963–73)

Member of the New York State Senate
- In office January 1, 1941 – December 31, 1954
- Preceded by: Joseph D. Nunan, Jr.
- Succeeded by: Edward J. Speno
- Constituency: 2nd district (1941–44); 4th district (1945–54)

Personal details
- Born: November 19, 1913 New York City, New York, U.S.
- Died: January 10, 1997 (aged 83) Southampton, New York, U.S.
- Party: Republican
- Spouse: Barbara Olsen (m. 1959)
- Education: Columbia University

Seymour Halpern (November 19, 1913 – January 10, 1997) was an American politician from New York.

== Life ==
He was born in New York City. He graduated from Richmond Hill High School and attended Seth Low Junior College of Columbia University from 1932 to 1934. He worked as a newspaper reporter in New York and Chicago from 1931 to 1933 and also engaged in the insurance business.

Halpern was a staff assistant to Mayor Fiorello La Guardia in 1937; and an assistant to the President of the New York City Council from 1938 to 1940.

He was a member of the New York State Senate from 1941 to 1954, sitting in the 163rd, 164th, 165th, 166th, 167th, 168th and 169th New York State Legislatures. He also served as a member of the Temporary State Commission to Revise the Civil Service Laws from 1952 to 1954. He was an unsuccessful Republican candidate for election to the 84th Congress in 1954.

He was a member of Mayor's Committee on Courts from 1956 to 1958. He also served as vice president and later chairman of the board of the Insurist Corporation of America from 1948 to 1959.

He was elected as a Republican to the 86th, 87th, 88th, 89th, 90th, 91st and 92nd United States Congresses, holding office from January 3, 1959, to January 3, 1973." When Halpern's district was combined with that of Representative Lester Wolff he chose not to run for re-election in 1972. He later worked in public relations.

One of the most liberal Republicans in the House who often got endorsement from labor unions and the Liberal Party of New York, Halpern voted in favor of the Civil Rights Act of 1960, the Civil Rights Act of 1964 and the Civil Rights Act of 1968, as well as the 24th Amendment to the U.S. Constitution and the Voting Rights Act of 1965. Halpern, like his fellow New York Republicans in the House, voted in favor of the creation of Medicare, and was one of thirteen Republicans in the House of Representatives to support the Food Stamp Act of 1964 and one of twenty-two Republicans to support the Economic Opportunity Act of 1964. Born in a family of Republicans, the liberal Halpern refused suggestions to switch to the Democratic Party. Like fellow New York Republicans Jacob Javits, John Lindsay and Kenneth Keating, Halpern refused to support Senator Barry Goldwater's nomination as Republican candidate for the 1964 United States presidential election. Halpern described his co-sponsoring of the Civil Rights Act of 1964 and Medicare as two of his proudest achievements.

On January 26, 1971, alongside fellow Republicans F. Bradford Morse, Charles Adams Mosher and Ogden Reid, Halpern was one of seventy-four representatives in the House to support the House version of Ted Kennedy's Health Security Act, a bill that supported universal health coverage in America through a government-administered program.

He died in Southampton on January 10, 1997, aged 83. His wife Barbara Olsen, whom he married in 1959, died in 2015. The couple never had any children. Halpern was buried at Mount Lebanon Cemetery in the Glendale section of Queens.

== See also ==
- List of Jewish members of the United States Congress

== General Reference ==
- Seymour Halpern Papers, 1959-1965. M.E. Grenander Department of Special Collections and Archives, University Libraries, University at Albany, State University of New York (hereafter referred to as the Halpern Papers).

New York State Senate
Preceded by Joseph D. Nunan, Jr.	New York State Senate; 2nd District; 1941–1944	Succeeded by John D. Bennett
Preceded by Carmine J. Marasco	New York State Senate; 4th District; 1945–1954	Succeeded by Edward J. Speno
U.S. House of Representatives
Preceded by Henry J. Latham	Member of the U.S. House of Representatives from New York's 4th congressional district 1959–1963	Succeeded by John W. Wydler
Preceded by Benjamin Rosenthal	Member of the U.S. House of Representatives from New York's 6th congressional district 1963–1973	Succeeded by Lester L. Wolff
