= Scoon =

Scoon is a surname. Notable people with this surname include:

- Paul Scoon (1935–2013), Governor General of Grenada from 1978 to 1992
- Paula Gopee-Scoon (born 1958), politician from Trinidad and Tobago, Minister of Foreign Affairs in the Manning Administration from 2007 to 2010
- Thompson M. Scoon (1888–1953), American politician in New York

== See also ==
- 6632 Scoon, a main-belt asteroid
