= Frederic Hammer =

Frederic Hammer may refer to:

- Fred Hammer (1930–2020), or Frédéric Hammer,Luxembourgish sprinter
- Frederic E. Hammer (1909–1980), American lawyer and politician from New York
