= Senator Scanlon =

Senator Scanlon may refer to:

- Eugene Scanlon (1924–1994), Pennsylvania State Senate
- Joseph Scanlon (1924–1970), Pennsylvania State Senate
- Charles V. Scanlan (1893–1964), New York State Senate
