= Senator Archibald =

Senator Archibald may refer to:

- Frank C. Archibald (Vermont politician) (1857–1935), Vermont State Senate
- Julius A. Archibald (1901–1979), New York State Senate
