= Harold I. Panken =

American politician and politician

Harold Ira Panken (July 17, 1910 – March 1999) was an American lawyer and State Senator from New York.

== Life ==
He was born on July 17, 1910, in Manhattan, New York City, the son of Abraham Panken (born 1878). He attended the public schools and high schools. He graduated B.Sc. from New York University; and J.D. from New York University School of Law. He practiced law in New York City. In 1934, he married Sylvia, and they had three sons, Peter, Bruce, and Jeffery.

Panken was a member of the New York State Senate (21st D.) from 1947 to 1952, sitting in the 166th, 167th and 168th New York State Legislatures. In August 1952, he ran for re-election in the Democratic primary with the backing of Tammany Hall, but was defeated by Julius A. Archibald.

He died in March 1999.

== Sources ==
New York State Senate
Preceded by Gordon I. Novod	New York State Senate; 21st District; 1949–1952	Succeeded by Julius A. Archibald
