= Thomas Fitzpatrick (Queens) =

American lawyer and politician (1909–1972)

Thomas Fitzpatrick (February 6, 1909 – April 15, 1972) was an American lawyer and politician from New York.

== Early life and education ==
He was born on February 6, 1909. He attended St. Monica's School in Jamaica, Queens, and St. John's Preparatory School in Brooklyn. He graduated B.A. from St. John's College; and LL.B. and J.S.D. from St. John's University School of Law.

== Career ==
He practiced law in New York City, and entered politics as a Democrat.

Fitzpatrick was a member of the New York State Assembly (Queens Co., 11th D.) in 1945 and 1946.

He was again a member of the State Assembly from 1949 to 1954, sitting in the 167th, 168th, 169th and 170th New York State Legislatures.

In 1954, he was appointed by Mayor Robert F. Wagner, Jr. as a City Magistrate, became a justice of the Criminal Court in 1962, and remained on the bench until his death in 1972.

== Death ==
He died on April 15, 1972, at his home in Jamaica, Queens, of a heart attack.

== Sources ==
New York State Assembly
| Preceded by new district | New York State Assembly; Queens County, 11th District; 1945–1946 | Succeeded by Sidney Paymer |
| Preceded by Sidney Paymer | New York State Assembly; Queens County, 11th District; 1949–1954 | Succeeded by Daniel L. Clarke |
