= Elaine Kraf =

American novelist and painter

Elaine Joan Kraf
- Born: February 21, 1936; New York City
- Died: June 26, 2013 (aged 77)
- Occupation: Novelist
- Children: Milena Kraf Altman-London
- Writing career
- Period: 1988–2013
- Genres: Literary fiction, Avant-garde fiction
- Notable awards: National Endowment for the Arts

Elaine Joan Kraf (February 21, 1936 – June 26, 2013) was an American novelist, short story writer, and painter from New York City. She wrote I Am Clarence, The Princess of 72nd Street, and the experimental novel, Find Him!, a "brilliant spatial meditation of the abstract machine of femininity." She was the recipient of two National Endowment for the Arts awards, a 1971 fellowship at the Bread Loaf Writers' Conference, and a 1977 residency at Yaddo. Her artwork was exhibited in, among other places, the Ward-Nasse Gallery in SoHo, Manhattan.

Kraf was born on February 21, 1936, in New York City. She was the daughter of Harry Kraf and the cousin of Marvin Sylvor. Kraf and her husband, Martin Altman, had one daughter, Milena.

== Critical response ==
Kraf's novels were praised by critics for their originality, intelligence and strong voice, and she got especially positive reviews for her first novel in 1969, with one reviewer calling it "beautifully written and Miss Kraf's success in creating an intense experience for her readers demands admiration," and another stating "Elaine Kraf has a remarkable tour de force in her first novel. Brilliant and moving, its story is both sad and disturbing."

Although Find Him! is now considered a cult classic, the novel mystified some contemporary reviewers. The St. Louis Post-Dispatch's Robert Boyd, in "Novels That Are Novel," said the book "had me confused at times as to the significance of its collage-like bits and pieces, but left no doubt as to her gifts as a stylist."

== Bibliography ==
- I Am Clarence (1969)
- The House of Madelaine (1971)
- Find Him! (1977)
- The Princess of 72nd Street (1979)
- Memory House (2026)
