= Wheeler Milmoe =

American politician (1898–1972)

Wheeler Milmoe (April 18, 1898 – April 8, 1972) was an American newspaper editor and politician from New York.

== Life ==
He was born on April 18, 1898, in Canastota, Madison County, New York, the son Patrick F. Milmoe (died 1918) and Margaret M. Milmoe. He attended the public schools, and Canastota High School. He graduated A.B. from Cornell University in 1917. After the death of his father he took over he publication of The Canastota Bee–Journal. On July 6, 1927, he married Frances Veronica Tobin, and they had two children.

Milmoe was a member of the New York State Assembly (Madison Co.) in 1934, 1935, 1936, 1937, 1938, 1939–40, 1941–42, 1943–44, 1945–46, 1947–48, 1949–50 and 1951–52.

He was a member of the New York State Senate from 1953 to 1958, sitting in the 169th, 170th and 171st New York State Legislatures. He was an alternate delegate to the 1956 Republican National Convention.

He died on April 8, 1972, in Oneida City Hospital in Oneida, New York; and was buried at St. Agatha's Cemetery in Canastota.

== Sources ==
New York State Assembly
Preceded by Arthur A. Hartshorn	New York State Assembly; Madison County; 1934–1952	Succeeded by Harold I. Tyler
New York State Senate
Preceded by Walter W. Stokes	New York State Senate; 44th District; 1953–1954	Succeeded by Searles G. Shultz
Preceded by Dutton Peterson	New York State Senate; 46th District; 1955–1958	Succeeded by Janet Hill Gordon
