= Harry J. Donnelly =

American politician

Member of the New York City Council from Brooklyn's at-large district
- In office January 1, 1964 – 1966
- Preceded by: District created
- Succeeded by: Mildred P. Rosen

Member of the New York State Assembly from Kings's 3rd district
- In office January 1, 1957 – December 31, 1960
- Preceded by: Mary A. Gillen
- Succeeded by: Joseph J. Dowd

Personal details
- Born: June 24, 1922 Brooklyn, New York City, New York
- Died: May 20, 1989 (aged 66) Manhattan, New York City, New York
- Party: Republican

Harry J. Donnelly (June 24, 1922 – May 20, 1989) was an American politician who served in the New York State Assembly from Kings's 3rd district from 1957 to 1960 and in the New York City Council from Brooklyn's at-large district from 1964 to 1966.

A resident of Breezy Point, Queens, he died of cancer on May 20, 1989, in Manhattan, New York City, New York at age 66.
