= Thomas F. Campbell =

American businessman and politician

Thomas F. Campbell (August 26, 1897 – March 7, 1957) was an American businessman and politician from New York.

== Life ==
He was born on August 26, 1897, in Amsterdam, Montgomery County, New York, the son of Detective Michael Campbell (died 1902). After the death of his father, the family removed to Schenectady. There he attended St. Joseph's School. He graduated from Niagara University, and in 1920 began to work for General Electric in Schenectady. In 1932, he became a funeral director.

He entered politics as a Republican. He was a member of the Board of Supervisors of Schenectady County from the 7th Ward of the City of Schenectady from 1931 to 1935; a member of the City Council of Schenectady from 1936 to 1944; and a member of the New York State Senate from 1945 until his death in 1957, sitting in the 165th, 166th, 167th, 168th, 169th, 170th and 171st New York State Legislatures.

On February 26, 1957, he underwent an operation of a brain tumor in Albany Hospital. He died unmarried on March 7, 1957, at his home at 1503 Union Street in Schenectady, New York.

== Sources ==
- State Sen. Thomas F. Campbell, Native of Amsterdam, Dies at 59, After Surgery for Brain Tumor in the Evening Recorder, of Amsterdam, on March 8, 1957

New York State Senate
Preceded by Isaac B. Mitchell	Member of the New York State Senate from the 37th district 1945–1954	Succeeded by Henry Neddo
Preceded by Henry Neddo	Member of the New York State Senate from the 38th district 1955–1957	Succeeded by Owen M. Begley
