= Henry Neddo =

American politician

Henry Neddo (May 12, 1881 – January 11, 1957) was an American businessman, banker and politician from New York.

== Life ==
He was born on May 12, 1881, on a farm in Whitehall, Washington County, New York, the son of George Neddo (1836–1916) and Delia (Archambault) Neddo (1850–1913). He attended the public schools, and graduated from Albany Business College. Then he worked with his father in the family's century-old boat-building business. At the same time he was an adjuster for several marine insurance companies. He married Mary Barrett (1876–1971), and they had two children. In 1908, he sold the boat business and opened a general store instead. Later he also engaged in banking, and was President of the Merchants National Bank of Whitehall.

He entered politics as a Republican, and was a delegate to the 1898 Republican state convention, and much later a member of the Republican State Executive Committee. He held many local offices, being at times a canal superintendent, town clerk, postmaster, and president of the school board.

Neddo was a member of the New York State Assembly (Washington Co.) from 1941 to 1949, sitting in the 163rd, 164th, 165th, 166th and 167th New York State Legislatures. In January 1947, his 38-year-old son Francis J. Neddo, a lawyer in Saratoga Springs, was killed in a car accident. Neddo was an alternate delegate to the 1948 Republican National Convention. He resigned his seat in 1949, to run for the State Senate seat vacated by the appointment of Benjamin F. Feinberg as Chairman of the New York State Public Service Commission.

Neddo was a member of the New York State Senate from 1950 until his death in 1957, sitting in the 167th, 168th, 169th, 170th and 171st New York State Legislatures.

He died on January 11, 1957, at his home in Whitehall, New York; and was buried at the Neddo Cemetery there.

New York State Assembly
Preceded by Herbert A. Bartholomew	New York State Assembly; Washington County; 1941–1949	Succeeded by William J. Reid
New York State Senate
Preceded by Benjamin F. Feinberg	New York State Senate; 38th District; 1950–1954	Succeeded by Thomas F. Campbell
Preceded by Thomas F. Campbell	New York State Senate; 37th District; 1955–1957	Succeeded by Albert Berkowitz
