= Herbert A. Bartholomew =

American politician (1871–1958)

Herbert Almon Bartholomew (November 3, 1871 – October 26, 1958) was an American politician from New York.

== Life ==
Bartholomew was born on November 3, 1871, on a farm in Whitehall, Washington County, New York, the son of Heman Almon Bartholomew (1834–1922) and Alice Lanta (Douglass) Bartholomew (1841–1921). In 1896, he married Harriet Gibson Douglass (1874–1962), and they had two sons: Herbert Almon Bartholonew Jr MD and Corp. Harry D. Bartholomew (died 1932).

Bartholomew was a member of the New York State Assembly (Washington Co.) in 1921, 1922, 1923, 1924, 1925, 1926, 1927, 1928, 1929, 1930, 1931, 1932, 1933, 1934, 1935, 1936, 1937, 1938 and 1939–40. He was Chairman of the Committee on Canals in 1924; and of the Committee on Internal Affairs of Towns and Counties from 1927 to 1934 and from 1936 to 1940.

He was a delegate to the 1936, 1944 and 1952 Republican National Conventions; and an alternate delegate to the 1940 Republican National Convention.

He was Sergeant-at-Arms of the State Assembly from 1951 to 1955, officiating in the 168th, 169th and 170th New York State Legislatures.

He died on October 26, 1958, in Koch's Nursing Home in Glens Falls, New York; and was buried at the Brick Church Cemetery in Whitehall.

New York State Assembly
| Preceded by Eugene R. Norton | New York State Assembly; Washington County; 1921–1940 | Succeeded by Henry Neddo |
