= John D. Bennett =

American politician

Member of the New York Senate from the 2nd district
- In office 1945–1953
- Preceded by: Seymour Halpern
- Succeeded by: Edward P. Larkin

Member of the New York State Assembly from the 1st district
- In office 1938–1944
- Preceded by: Harold P. Herman
- Succeeded by: Frank J. Becker

Personal details
- Born: June 21, 1911 Rockville Centre, New York, US
- Died: February 1, 2005 (aged 93) Greenport, New York, US
- Education: Cornell University

John Davison Bennett (June 21, 1911 – February 1, 2005) was an American lawyer and politician from New York.

== Life ==
He was born on June 21, 1911, in Rockville Centre, Nassau County, New York, the son of Earl Job Bennett (1878–1965) and Edna (Davison) Bennett (1880–1960). He attended South Side High School in Rockville Centre, and graduated from Cornell Law School in 1935. He married Mildred Schwindt, and they had two children.

Bennett was a member of the New York State Assembly (Nassau Co., 1st D.) from 1938 to 1944, sitting in the 161st, 162nd, 163rd and 164th New York State Legislatures.

He was a member of the New York State Senate (2nd D.) from 1945 to 1953, sitting in the 165th, 166th, 167th and 168th and 169th New York State Legislatures. He resigned his seat in 1953, and on November 3, 1953, was elected as Surrogate of Nassau County.

He was Surrogate of Nassau County from 1954 to 1980; and a delegate to the New York State Constitutional Convention of 1967.

He died on February 1, 2005, at The Shores at Peconic Landing assisted living facility in Greenport, Suffolk County, New York; and was buried at the Greenfield Cemetery in Uniondale.

== Sources ==
New York State Assembly
Preceded by Harold P. Herman	New York State Assembly; Nassau County, 1st District; 1938–1944	Succeeded by Frank J. Becker
New York State Senate
Preceded by Seymour Halpern	New York State Senate; 2nd District; 1945–1953	Succeeded by Edward P. Larkin
