= David O'Brien Martin =

American politician

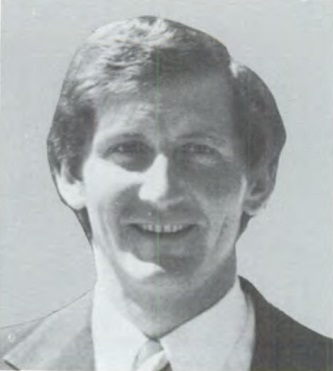

Member of the U.S. House of Representatives from New York
- In office January 3, 1981 – January 3, 1993
- Preceded by: Robert C. McEwen
- Succeeded by: Maurice D. Hinchey
- Constituency: 30th district (1981–1983); 26th district (1983–1993)

Member of the New York State Assembly from the 112th district
- In office January 1, 1977 – December 31, 1980
- Preceded by: K. Daniel Haley
- Succeeded by: John G. A. O'Neil

Personal details
- Born: David O'Brien Martin; April 26, 1944 St. Lawrence County, New York, U.S.
- Died: November 20, 2012 (aged 68) Hedgesville, West Virginia, U.S.
- Party: Republican
- Spouse(s): DeeAnn Hedlund; Dana McGee
- Education: University of Notre Dame; Albany Law School

Military service
- Allegiance: United States of America
- Branch/service: United States Marine Corps
- Years of service: 1966–1970
- Battles/wars: Vietnam War

David O'Brien Martin (April 26, 1944 – November 20, 2012) was an American lawyer, politician, and veteran of the Vietnam War who served six terms as a Republican member of the United States House of Representatives from New York from 1981 to 1993.

== Early life and education ==
Martin was born in St. Lawrence County, New York. He graduated from Hugh C. Williams High School (Canton, New York) in 1962, and the University of Notre Dame in 1966. He graduated from Albany Law School in 1973.

== Vietnam War ==
From 1966–70, he served in the United States Marine Corps as a flight officer, and deployed to Vietnam during the Vietnam War. He achieved the rank of captain.

== Political career ==
He was a member of the New York State Assembly from 1977 to 1980, sitting in the 182nd and 183rd New York State Legislature.

=== Congress ===
He was elected to the U.S. House of Representatives in 1980 and served from January 3, 1981, to January 3, 1993. He was succeeded by John M. McHugh. Due to redistricting which took effect after the 1992 elections, the geographical area Martin represented was renumbered, and McHugh took office as the representative from the 24th district of New York. Martin did not run in the 1992 election.

While in Congress, he was a member of the House Armed Services Committee, where he worked to shape national security policy in the final years of the Cold War. Martin was the primary sponsor of one successfully enacted bill in 1990 allowing the Secretary of the Air Force to purchase housing for Air Force members at the Pease Air Force Base. Overall, he introduced 6 bills.

== Later career ==
After Congress, he taught at the Naval War College from 1993 to 1994, and subsequently founded the government relations firm of Martin, Fisher, and Thompson in Washington.

== Private life ==
He married twice, first to DeeAnn Hedlund with whom he had three daughters, then to Dana McGee.

== Death ==
He resided in Hedgesville, West Virginia, where he died November 20, 2012, from cancer, aged 68. He is interred in Arlington National Cemetery.

New York State Assembly
Preceded by K. Daniel Haley	New York State Assembly; 112th District; 1977–1980	Succeeded by John G. A. O'Neil
U.S. House of Representatives
Preceded by Robert C. McEwen	Member of the U.S. House of Representatives from New York's 30th congressional district 1981–1983	Succeeded by Barber Conable
Preceded by Benjamin Gilman	Member of the U.S. House of Representatives from New York's 26th congressional district 1983–1993	Succeeded by Maurice D. Hinchey
