= Eugenio Alvarez =

American lawyer and politician (1918–1976)

Member of the New York State Assembly from the 75th district
- In office 1973–1974

Personal details
- Born: Eugenio Alfredo Alvarez; July 21, 1918 Bayamón, Puerto Rico
- Died: February 12, 1976 (aged 57) Manhattan, New York, U.S.
- Party: Democratic
- Spouse: Ines Leon (m. 1943)
- Children: 2
- Education: Baruch College (BBA)
- Occupation: Politician

Eugenio Alfredo Alvarez (July 21, 1918 – February 12, 1976) was an American politician from New York. Born in Bayamón, Puerto Rico, he served in the New York State Assembly from 1973 to 1974.

== Early life ==
Eugenio Alfredo Alvarez was born on July 21, 1918, to Juana (née Rodriguez) and Innocencio Alvarez, in Bayamón, Puerto Rico. He attended Public School No. 19 and Curtis High School. He graduated from Wagner College and New York Law School. He graduated with a Bachelor of Business Administration from Baruch School of Business and Finance (then City College of New York).

== Career ==
In the early 1940s, Alvarez moved from Puerto Rico to New York City. He was deputy director of licensing of the Taxi and Limousine Commission. He also served as vice president of the Morhan National Sales Company and the Morhan Exporting Corporation of Plainview.

Alvarez was a Democrat. He was a delegate to the 1972 Democratic National Convention. From 1973 to 1974, he served as a member of the New York State Assembly, district 75. In August 1974, he resigned his post as assemblyman to accept an appointment as Deputy Commissioner of Housing Supervision of New York City's Housing and Development Administration. He remained in that role up until his death. He also served as a member of the Mitchell-Lama Supervision Task Force.

Alvarez was a member of Boricuas Ausentes Inc., the Puerto Rican College Graduates Association, the Men's Club, Congregation Hope of Israel, and the City College Club. He was chairman of the Associated Council to Inform Our Neighbors Inc. and a member of the board of directors of the Pamela C. Torres Day Care Center. He was a member of the executive board of the Bronx unit of the American Cancer Society.

== Personal life ==
In 1943, Alvarez married Ines Leon, daughter of Carlos and Antonia Fernandez Leon. They had a son and daughter, Eugenio Jr. and Carlota. He lived in the Bronx. He was Catholic.

Alvarez died on February 12, 1976, at Beekman Downtown Hospital in Manhattan.

== See also ==
- Nuyorican
- Puerto Ricans in New York City

New York State Assembly
Preceded by Harry Kraf	New York State Assembly; 75th District; 1973–1974	Succeeded by José E. Serrano
