= A. Gould Hatch =

American politician (1896–1970)

Arthur Gould Hatch (May 31, 1896 – December 8, 1970) was an American politician from New York.

== Life ==
He was born on May 31, 1896, in Walworth, Wayne County, New York. He engaged in the insurance business in Rochester, Monroe County, New York, and entered politics as a Republican.

Hatch was a member of the New York State Assembly from 1949 to 1957, sitting in the 167th, 168th, 169th, 170th and 171st New York State Legislatures. He was elected on February 14, 1957, to the New York State Senate (52nd D.), to fill the vacancy caused by the death of George T. Manning. He resigned his seat in the Assembly on February 27, when the result of the special election was certified, and took his seat in the State Senate. He was re-elected in November 1958, and remained in the Senate until the end of the 172nd New York State Legislature in 1960.

He was Clerk of Monroe County from 1961 to 1966.

He died on December 8, 1970, at his home in Rochester, New York.

== Sources ==
New York State Assembly
Preceded by Abraham Schulman	New York State Assembly; Monroe County, 2nd District; 1949–1957	Succeeded by John J. Conway, Jr.
New York State Senate
Preceded by George T. Manning	New York State Senate; 52nd District; 1957–1960	Succeeded by Thomas Laverne
