= Nathaniel T. Helman =

American lawyer and politician

Nathaniel T. Helman (February 10, 1905 – October 31, 1993) was an American lawyer and politician from New York.

== Life ==
He was born on February 10, 1905, in New York City. He married Minnie (1910–2004), and they had two sons. He was Jewish.

Helman was a member of the New York State Senate from 1950 to 1960, sitting in the 167th, 168th, 169th, 170th, 171st and 172nd New York State Legislatures. He was a delegate to the 1956 Democratic National Convention, and an alternate delegate to the 1960 Democratic National Convention. In November 1960, he was elected to the City Court.

He was a justice of the City Court in 1961. He resigned on September 19, and in November 1961 was elected to the New York Supreme Court. He was a justice of the Supreme Court from 1962 to 1981.

He died on October 31, 1993, in Lenox Hill Hospital in Manhattan, of cancer.

New York State Senate
Preceded by Louis Bennett	New York State Senate; 26th District; 1950–1954	Succeeded by John J. Donovan, Jr.
Preceded by Francis J. McCaffrey	New York State Senate; 28th District; 1955–1960	Succeeded by Abraham Bernstein
