= Frank Composto =

American lawyer and politician

Frank Composto (May 26, 1907 – July 14, 1995) was an American lawyer and politician from New York.

== Life ==
He was born on May 26, 1907. He attended Public School No. 40, Brooklyn Vocational School, and Bay Ridge Evening High School. He graduated from St. John's College and St. John's University School of Law. He married Concetta Formica, and they had three children.

Composto was a member of the New York State Assembly (Kings Co., 8th D.) from 1950 to 1958, sitting in the 167th, 168th, 169th, 170th and 171st New York State Legislatures.

He was a member of the New York State Senate from 1959 to 1962, sitting in the 172nd and 173rd New York State Legislatures. In November 1962, he was elected to the New York City Civil Court.

He was a justice of the Civil Court from 1963 to August 1970 when he and four other judges resigned to open the way for nominating candidates for these seats for the November election while the five ran for seats on the Supreme Court at the same time. On September 28, he was appointed to fill the vacancy in the Civil Court caused by his own resignation until the end of the year. In November 1970, he was elected to the New York Supreme Court.

He died on July 14, 1995, in New City, Rockland County, New York.

== Sources ==
New York State Assembly
Preceded by Arthur A. Low	New York State Assembly; Kings County, 8th District; 1950–1958	Succeeded by Guy James Mangano
New York State Senate
Preceded by Thomas J. Cuite	New York State Senate; 13th District; 1959–1962	Succeeded by Guy James Mangano
