= Mary A. Gillen =

American politician (1894–1963)

Member of the New York State Assembly from the Kings County 3rd district
- In office 1942 – December 31, 1956
- Preceded by: Michael J. Gillen
- Succeeded by: Harry J. Donnelly

Personal details
- Born: Mary Agnes Burke; October 8, 1894
- Died: September 14, 1963 (aged 68) New York City, U.S.
- Resting place: Holy Cross Cemetery, New York City, U.S.
- Spouse: Michael J. Gillen (m. 1917; died 1942)
- Occupation: Politician

Mary A. Gillen (October 8, 1894 – September 14, 1963) was an American politician from New York.

== Life ==
She was born Mary Agnes Burke on October 8, 1894, the daughter of Michael Burke (1856–1912) and Anne Bridget (O'Gara) Burke (1858–1906). On February 4, 1917, she married Michael J. Gillen (1885–1942), and they had several children.

Her husband was a member of the New York State Assembly (Kings Co., 3rd D.) from 1926 until his death on February 1, 1942. On February 16, she was nominated to run at a special election to fill the vacancy caused by her husband's death. On March 10, 1942, she was elected to the 163rd New York State Legislature. On March 13, she took her seat for the last six weeks of the legislative session. She was re-elected several times and remained in the State Assembly until 1956, sitting in the 164th, 165th, 166th, 167th, 168th, 169th and 170th New York State Legislatures. In November 1956, she ran for re-election but was defeated by Republican Harry J. Donnelly.

She died on September 14, 1963, in St. Mary's Hospital in Brooklyn; and was buried at the Holy Cross Cemetery there.

== Sources ==
New York State Assembly
Preceded by Michael J. Gillen	New York State Assembly; Kings County, 3rd District; 1942–1956	Succeeded by Harry J. Donnelly
