= Guy James Mangano =

American politician (1930–2025)

Guy James Mangano (January 14, 1930 – June 20, 2025) was an American lawyer and politician from New York.

== Life and career ==
Mangano was born on January 14, 1930, in Brooklyn, New York City, the son of Assemblyman James V. Mangano (1905–1988) and Rose (Mancaruso) Mangano. He attended the public schools in Brooklyn, Poly Preparatory School, Carson-Long Military Academy and Fordham University. He graduated from St. John's University School of Law in 1955. He entered politics as a Democrat and became investigator and counsel to legislative committees.

He was a member of the New York State Assembly (Kings Co., 8th D.) from 1959 to 1962, sitting in the 172nd and 173rd New York State Legislatures; and a member of the New York State Senate from 1963 to 1965, sitting in the 174th and 175th New York State Legislatures. In November 1965, after re-apportionment, he was re-elected in the 24th district to the State Senate, but he did not take his seat in the 176th New York State Legislature because he was appointed by Mayor Robert F. Wagner, Jr. to the New York City Family Court in December 1965.

In November 1968, Mangano was elected to the New York Supreme Court. In January 1979, he was designated to the Appellate Division and was appointed Presiding Justice of the 2nd Department in March 1990. He retired from the bench at the end of 2000 when he reached the constitutional age limit.

In 2001, he began to work for JAMS, a mediation and arbitration firm.

On June 19, 2025, Mangano died at the age of 95.

== Sources ==
New York State Assembly
Preceded by Frank Composto	New York State Assembly; Kings County, 8th District; 1959–1962	Succeeded by William J. Ferrall
New York State Senate
Preceded by Frank Composto	New York State Senate; 13th District; 1963–1965	Succeeded by Seymour R. Thaler
