= Joseph E. Parisi =

American politician

Joseph E. Parisi (May 10, 1913 – May 29, 1990) was an American politician from New York.

== Biography ==
He was born on May 10, 1913, in Brooklyn, New York City. He engaged in the real estate business. On July 4, 1935, he married Grace Rasulo, and they had three children.

Hammer was a member of the New York State Senate (14th D.) from 1945 to 1948, sitting in the 165th and 166th New York State Legislatures. In November 1948, he ran for re-election, but was defeated by Democrat Mario M. DeOptatis. Parisi was a delegate to the 1948, 1952, 1956, 1960 and 1964 Republican National Conventions.

He was Deputy Clerk of the Kings County Court, and later Chief Clerk of the Criminal Term of the New York Supreme Court in Brooklyn. In 1973, Ex-Justice David L. Malbin, Chief Clerk Parisi and 28 others were accused of receiving bribes for abetting a scheme by trade union officials to embezzle money from the union's funds. Their trial began on June 30, 1975. On July 1, Ex-Justice Malbin was acquitted, but the trial of Parisi continued.

Later he moved to Rye, Westchester County, New York. He died on May 29, 1990, in Union Hospital in Port Chester, New York.

New York State Senate
Preceded by William J. Murray	New York State Senate; 14th District; 1945–1948	Succeeded by Mario M. DeOptatis
