= Henry J. Latham =

American politician (1908–2002)

Henry Latham
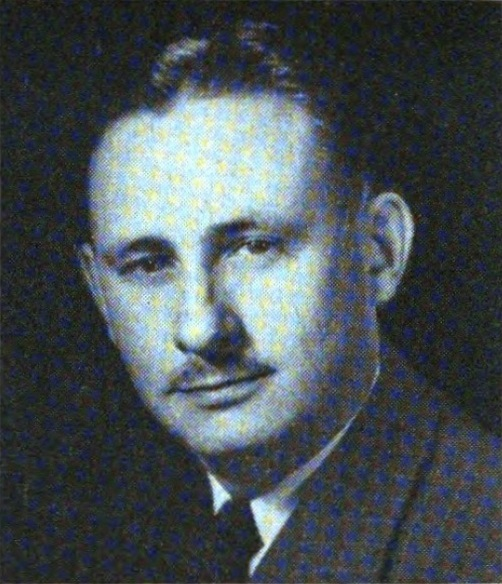
- From 1955's Pocket Congressional Directory of the Eighty-Fourth Congress

Justice of the New York Supreme Court, Appellate Division for the 2nd Department
- In office January 29, 1970 – December 31, 1978
- Preceded by: Arthur D. Brennan
- Succeeded by: Leon D. Lazer

Justice of the New York Supreme Court for the 10th District
- In office January 1, 1959 – January 28, 1970
- Preceded by: None (position created)

Member of the U.S. House of Representatives from New York
- In office January 3, 1945 – December 31, 1958
- Preceded by: Joseph L. Pfeifer
- Succeeded by: Frank J. Becker
- Constituency: 3rd district (1945–1953); 4th district (1953–1958)

Member of the New York State Assembly from the Queens County, 4th district district
- In office January 1, 1941 – December 31, 1942
- Preceded by: Daniel E. Fitzpatrick
- Succeeded by: William F. Bowe

Personal details
- Born: Henry Jepson Latham; December 10, 1908 Brooklyn, New York, U.S.
- Died: June 26, 2002 (aged 93) Southold, New York, U.S.
- Resting place: Saint Patricks Cemetery, Southold, New York, U.S.
- Party: Republican
- Spouse: Elizabeth Schwarze (m. 1937)
- Children: 2
- Education: St. John's College (attended); Brooklyn Law School (LL.B., LL.M.)
- Profession: Attorney

Military service
- Service: United States Navy
- Years of service: 1942–1945
- Wars: World War II

Henry Jepson Latham (December 10, 1908 – June 26, 2002) was an American attorney, politician, and jurist from New York. A Republican, he served in the New York State Assembly from 1941 to 1942, the United States House of Representatives from 1945 to 1958, and as a Justice of the New York Supreme Court from 1959 to 1978.

== Early life and education ==
He was born in Brooklyn on December 10, 1908. He graduated from Richmond Hill High School and attended the pre-law program at St. John's College. He graduated from Brooklyn Law School with an LL.B. degree in 1931. After graduation, Latham attained admission to the bar in 1932 and practiced in Jamaica, Queens. In 1933, he received a LL.M. from Brooklyn Law School. In 1960, Brooklyn Law School awarded Latham the honorary degree of LL.D.

== Career ==
A Republican, in 1938 he was an unsuccessful candidate for the New York State Senate. He was a member of the New York State Assembly (Queens Co., 4th D.) from 1941 to 1942. In 1942 Latham joined the United States Navy, became a pilot, and served in the Pacific Theater until February 1945. After the war, he continued to serve in the United States Navy Reserve.

In 1944, Latham was a successful candidate for the United States House of Representatives in absentia. He was reelected six times, and served in the 79th, 80th, 81st, 82nd, 83rd, 84th and 85th Congresses, January 3, 1945, to December 31, 1958. Latham voted in favor of the Civil Rights Act of 1957.

A conservative with a strong anti-communist stance, Latham served on the United States House Committee on Rules, and advocated increasing the size and capability of the United States Armed Forces. He also favored providing arms to Taiwan, then known as Formosa, so it could fight the Communist government of China.

Latham was a justice of the New York Supreme Court from 1959 to 1978.

== Death ==
He died on June 26, 2002, in Southold, New York. He was buried at Saint Patricks Cemetery in Southold.
