= Paul D. Graves =

American politician (1907–1972)

Paul D. Graves (November 23, 1907 – September 7, 1972) was an American lawyer and politician from New York.

== Life ==
He was born on November 23, 1907 in Gouverneur, St. Lawrence County, New York, the son of Perle Atwell Graves (1869–1954) and State Senator Rhoda Fox Graves (1877–1950). He attended school in Gouverneur, Storm-King Preparatory School in Cornwall-on-Hudson, and Colgate University. He graduated from Harvard Law School in 1934, was admitted to the bar in 1935, and practiced law in Buffalo. On May 4, 1940, he married Jane Anderson, and their only child was a son, Christopher Graves (1945–1975). During World War II, he served as a lieutenant in the U.S. Navy. After the war, he practiced law in Gouverneur.

In 1948, his mother retired from the State Senate, and Paul Graves was nominated to succeed her. He was a member of the New York State Senate (39th D.) from 1949 to 1953, sitting in the 167th, 168th and 169th New York State Legislatures.

On November 27, 1953, he was appointed to the New York Supreme Court (4th D.) to fill the vacancy caused by the death of O. Byron Brewster. In November 1954, he was elected to succeed himself, and remained on the bench until his death in 1972.

He underwent surgery in Mayo Clinic in Rochester, Minnesota, and died on September 7, 1972, in Methodist Hospital there. He was buried at the Riverside Cemetery in Gouverneur, New York.

New York State Senate
Preceded by Rhoda Fox Graves	New York State Senate; 39th District; 1949–1953	Succeeded by Robert C. McEwen
