= Julius J. Gans =

American lawyer, politician and judge (1896–1973)

Julius J. Gans (January 21, 1896 – April 24, 1973) was an American lawyer, politician, and judge from New York.

== Life ==
Gans was born on January 21, 1896, in New York City, New York, the son of Nathan Gans and Ida Lowenthal.

Gans attended Public School 188, DeWitt Clinton High School, and Dwight School. He then went to Brooklyn Law School, where he edited its legal publication "The Barrister," and graduated from there with a Bachelor of Laws in 1919. He was admitted to the bar in 1920 and began an active law practice. He moved to the Bronx in around 1914 and became active in political circles there, serving as a delegate to several judicial conventions and as a member of the speakers, law, and county committees of Bronx County.

In January 1936, Gans was elected to the New York State Assembly as a Democrat, representing the Bronx County 5th District. He was elected in a special election to fill a vacancy caused by the death of Benjamin Gladstone. He served in the Assembly in 1936, 1937, 1939-1940, 1941-1942, 1943-1944, 1945-1946, 1947-1948, 1949-1950, 1951-1952, and 1953-1954. He became a member of the New York State Postwar Public Works Planning Commission in 1943, ranking minority member of the Ways and Means Committee in 1947, president of the Legislative Pilots Association (an organization of Assembly members who served ten or more years) in 1952, and a member of the Commission on the Fiscal Affairs of State Government in 1953. He was also secretary of the Joint Legislative Committee on Labor and Industrial Conditions.

In the Assembly, Gans focused on labor and social security legislation. He was elected to the City Court in 1954. In 1961, he became an acting New York Supreme Court Justice. He was elected to a regular term as Justice in 1964 and served until his retirement three years later.

Gans was a social director in the Christodora House when he was sixteen, and he later served the same role in the Music School Settlement. He served as chairman Congregation Kneseth Israel Forum for at least five successive terms. He was treasurer of the Fifth Assembly District and the Unemployed Emergency Relief Drive, chairman of the district for the block-aid drive for funds to aid unemployment, vice-president of the Star Democratic Club, and a member of the Bronx Bar Association, the Freemasons, Sigma Phi Delta, the Elks, and the Grand Street Boys Association. He was married to Sylvia Tisch. Their children were Maurice George and Felice Marlyn.

Gans died in Doctors Hospital on April 24, 1973.

New York State Assembly
Preceded by Benjamin Gladstone	New York State Assembly; Bronx County, 5th District; 1936–1937	Succeeded by Nathaniel M. Minkoff
Preceded by Nathaniel M. Minkoff	New York State Assembly; Bronx County, 5th District; 1939–1944	Succeeded by Arthur Wachtel
Preceded by Peter A. Quinn	New York State Assembly; Bronx County, 6th District; 1945–1954	Succeeded by Walter Gladwin
