= George T. Manning =

American politician (1908–1956)

George T. Manning (May 30, 1908 – December 1, 1956) was an American politician from New York.

== Life ==
He was born on May 30, 1908. He attended Aquinas Institute and Rochester Business Institute. He engaged in the insurance business in Rochester, New York.

Manning was a member of the New York State Assembly (Monroe Co., 3rd D.) from 1939 to 1946, sitting in the 162nd, 163rd, 164th and 165th New York State Legislatures.

He was a member of the New York State Senate from 1947 until his death in 1956, sitting in the 166th, 167th, 168th, 169th and 170th New York State Legislatures.

He died on December 1, 1956, in Roswell Park Comprehensive Cancer Center (then known as Roswell Park Memorial Institute) in Buffalo, New York, of cancer.

== Sources ==
New York State Assembly
Preceded by Earl C. Langenbacher	New York State Assembly; Monroe County, 3rd District; 1939–1946	Succeeded by Raymond H. Combs
New York State Senate
Preceded by Rodney B. Janes	New York State Senate; 50th District; 1947–1954	Succeeded by Dutton Peterson
Preceded by Earl W. Brydges	New York State Senate; 52nd District; 1955–1956	Succeeded by A. Gould Hatch
