= Rhoda Fox Graves =

American politician (1877–1950)

- Born: Rhoda Fox; July 2, 1877; Fowler, New York
- Died: January 25, 1950 (aged 72); Hollywood, Florida
- Education: Gouverneur Wesleyan Seminary
- Occupation: Politician
- Spouse: Perle Atwell Graves (m. 1905)

Rhoda Fox Graves (July 2, 1877 – January 25, 1950) was a suffragist, women's rights activist, and early female Republican party politician from St. Lawrence County, New York in the United States. Graves was the first woman to serve in the New York State Senate, the first woman to hold office in both the upper and lower legislative houses in New York State, and the first woman to chair a New York Senate Committee.

== Early life and education ==
Rhoda Fox Graves was born on July 2, 1877, to Leander and Rhoda Martha (Burt) Austin in Fowler, New York. Her mother died from medical complications from childbirth, and her father placed her with his friends, LaFayette and Rhoda Ann (Shippee) Fox. The Foxes formally adopted her at age two.

Rhoda Fox grew up on the Fox family farm in Fowler, a small town southeast of Gouverneur, New York. She went to local public schools, the District School at Fowler, the Gouverneur High School, and Wesleyan Seminary in Gouverneur.

Prior to her marriage, Graves was a school teacher in rural public schools in the Gouverneur area.

On April 26, 1905, Fox married Perle Atwell Graves, the son of Daniel and Helen Graves. They had two sons, Mark and Paul.

== Political career ==
Graves began her political career by working with suffrage organizations in St. Lawrence County, distinguishing herself as an activist and gaining respect in the community. She remained politically active after women gained the right to vote and established herself as a successful voice for the Republican Party in an area of New York State that was slow to accept women in politics. From 1920 until 1935, Graves was Vice President of the St. Lawrence County Republican Committee, the first woman to hold the position. According to former New York assemblyman Grant Daniels, "because of her conquest of the initial resistance to women in politics, the cause of women's rights had been greatly advanced."

Graves was a member of the New York State Assembly (St. Lawrence Co., 1st D.) in 1925, 1926, 1927, 1928, 1929, 1930, 1931 and 1932. On the first day of the 1925 session of the New York State Assembly, she started her career as a legislator by introducing a bill that would allow youths who lived in rural areas and were less than 18 years of age to operate motor vehicles.

She was unsuccessful in her first attempt to attain a seat in the New York State Senate in 1932, but was elected in 1934. She was a member of the State Senate from 1935 to 1948, sitting in the 158th, 159th, 160th, 161st, 162nd, 163rd, 164th, 165th and 166th New York State Legislatures.

Graves was a trailblazer with her accomplishments as a female legislator in New York in the 1920s. She was the first woman to serve in the New York State Senate, the first woman to hold office in both the upper and lower legislative houses in New York State, and the first woman to chair a New York Senate Committee.

During her time as a New York legislator, she advocated for increased rights for females, including the right to serve on a jury.

Graves was founding member and vice chairman of a Republican State Committee council of women formed in 1929 to educate women voters about the upcoming election.

After her election to the State Senate, Graves founded the Organized Women Legislators of New York State and was its first president.

After Graves's re-election in January 1939, she became chair of the high-profile Senate Agricultural Committee.

In 1948, Graves announced that she would not seek re-election and that her son Paul D. Graves would be a candidate to succeed her for her seat. Paul Graves had a sizable win and took office in 1949. In 1953, he was appointed to the New York State Supreme Court, where he served until his death at age 64 in 1972.

Rhoda Fox Graves died on January 25, 1950, while at her winter home with her husband in Hollywood, Florida, of a heart attack. She was buried at the Riverside Cemetery in Gouverneur.

New York State Assembly
Preceded by William A. Laidlaw	New York State Assembly; St. Lawrence County, 1st District; 1925–1932	Succeeded by W. Allan Newell
New York State Senate
Preceded by Warren T. Thayer	New York State Senate; 34th District; 1935–1944	Succeeded by Arthur H. Wicks
Preceded by Walter W. Stokes	New York State Senate; 39th District; 1945–1948	Succeeded by Paul D. Graves
