= John J. Donovan Jr. =

American lawyer and politician

John J. Donovan Jr. (February 14, 1913 – March 12, 1955) was an American lawyer and politician from New York.

== Life ==
He was born on February 14, 1913, in the Bronx, New York City, the son of Dr. John J. Donovan and Harriet (O'Connor) Donovan. He attended St. Jerome's Academy. Fordham University

He was a member of the New York State Senate from 1951 to 1955, sitting in the 168th, 169th and 170th New York State Legislatures.

He died on March 12, 1955, in St. Elizabeth's Hospital in Manhattan, of a heart attack.

James B. Donovan (1916–1970), a lawyer and Cold War era negotiator, was his brother.

== Sources ==
New York State Senate
Preceded by Sidney A. Fine	New York State Senate; 24th District; 1951–1954	Succeeded by Joseph R. Marro
Preceded by Nathaniel T. Helman	New York State Senate; 26th District; 1955	Succeeded by Harry Kraf
