= Lawrence M. Rulison =

American politician (1917–1966)

Lawrence Mott Rulison (May 2, 1917 – July 23, 1966) was an American lawyer and politician from New York.

== Life ==
He was born on May 2, 1917, in Syracuse, Onondaga County, New York, the son of Howard V. Rulison (died (1947). He attended the public schools and Christian Brothers Academy. He graduated from Syracuse University in 1938, and then from Syracuse University College of Law. During World War II he served in the U.S. Marine Corps, eventually attaining the rank of lieutenant colonel. On June 5, 1943, he married Catherine Elizabeth Fox (1914–2008), and they had eight children.

Rulison was elected on December 18, 1945, to the New York State Assembly, to fill the vacancy caused by the election of Frank J. Costello as Mayor of Syracuse. Rulison was re-elected several times, and remained in the Assembly until 1958, sitting in the 165th, 166th, 167th, 168th, 169th, 170th and 171st New York State Legislatures.

He was a member of the New York State Senate (44th D.) from 1959 to 1964, sitting in the 172nd, 173rd and 174th New York State Legislatures. In 1964, the U.S. Supreme Court handed down several decisions establishing that State legislatures should follow the One man, one vote rule to apportion their election districts. A special Federal Statutory Court declared the New York apportionment formulae for both the State Senate and the State Assembly unconstitutional, and the State Legislature was ordered to re-apportion the seats by April 1, 1965. The court also ruled that the November 1964 election should be held under the 1954 apportionment, but those elected could serve only for one year (in 1965), and an election under the new apportionment should be held in November 1965. Senators John H. Hughes and Rulison questioned the authority of the federal court to shorten the term of the 1964 electees, alleging excessive costs for the additional election in an off-year. In November 1964, Rulison ran for re-election, but was defeated by Democrat Earl E. Boyle. On February 1, 1965, the U.S. Supreme Court upheld the Statutory Court's ruling.

In December 1965, Rulison was appointed to the New York Power Authority.

He died on July 23, 1966, in Upstate Medical Center in Syracuse, New York.

== Sources ==
New York State Assembly
Preceded by Frank J. Costello	New York State Assembly; Onondaga County, 3rd District; 1946–1954	Succeeded by Philip R. Chase
Preceded by Searles G. Shultz	New York State Assembly; Onondaga County, 1st District; 1955–1958	Succeeded by Don H. Brown
New York State Senate
Preceded by Searles G. Shultz	New York State Senate; 44th District; 1959–1964	Succeeded by Earl E. Boyle
