= Joseph J. Dowd =

American politician

Member of the New York State Assembly from the 52nd district
- In office January 1, 1967 – December 31, 1970
- Preceded by: George A. Cincotta
- Succeeded by: Joseph Martuscello

Member of the New York State Assembly from the 63rd district
- In office January 1, 1966 – December 31, 1966
- Preceded by: District created
- Succeeded by: William F. Passannante

Member of the New York State Assembly from Kings's 3rd district
- In office January 1, 1961 – December 31, 1965
- Preceded by: Harry J. Donnelly
- Succeeded by: District abolished

Personal details
- Born: September 3, 1927 Brooklyn, New York City, New York
- Died: October 6, 2007 (aged 80) Remsenburg, New York
- Party: Democratic

Joseph J. Dowd (September 3, 1927 – October 6, 2007) was an American politician who served in the New York State Assembly from 1961 to 1970.

He died on October 6, 2007, in Remsenburg, New York at age 80.
