= G. Frank Wallace =

American manufacturer and politician

George Franklin Wallace (May 14, 1887 – February 25, 1964) was an American manufacturer and politician from New York.

== Life ==
He was born on May 14, 1887, in Syracuse, New York, the son of tinsmith Emilus Franklin Wallace (1860–1920) and Mary (Schattle) Wallace (1858–1918). He attended the public schools. He manufactured glassware and mirrors. He married Rose M. Dershang (1885–1967).

Wallace was a member of the New York State Senate (38th D.) from 1941 to 1944, sitting in the 163rd and 164th New York State Legislatures.

He died on February 25, 1964, in Syracuse, New York; and was buried at the Oakwood Cemetery there.

== Sources ==
New York State Senate
Preceded by William C. Martin	New York State Senate; 38th District; 1941–1944	Succeeded by Benjamin F. Feinberg
