= Harry Kraf =

American lawyer and politician (1907–1989)

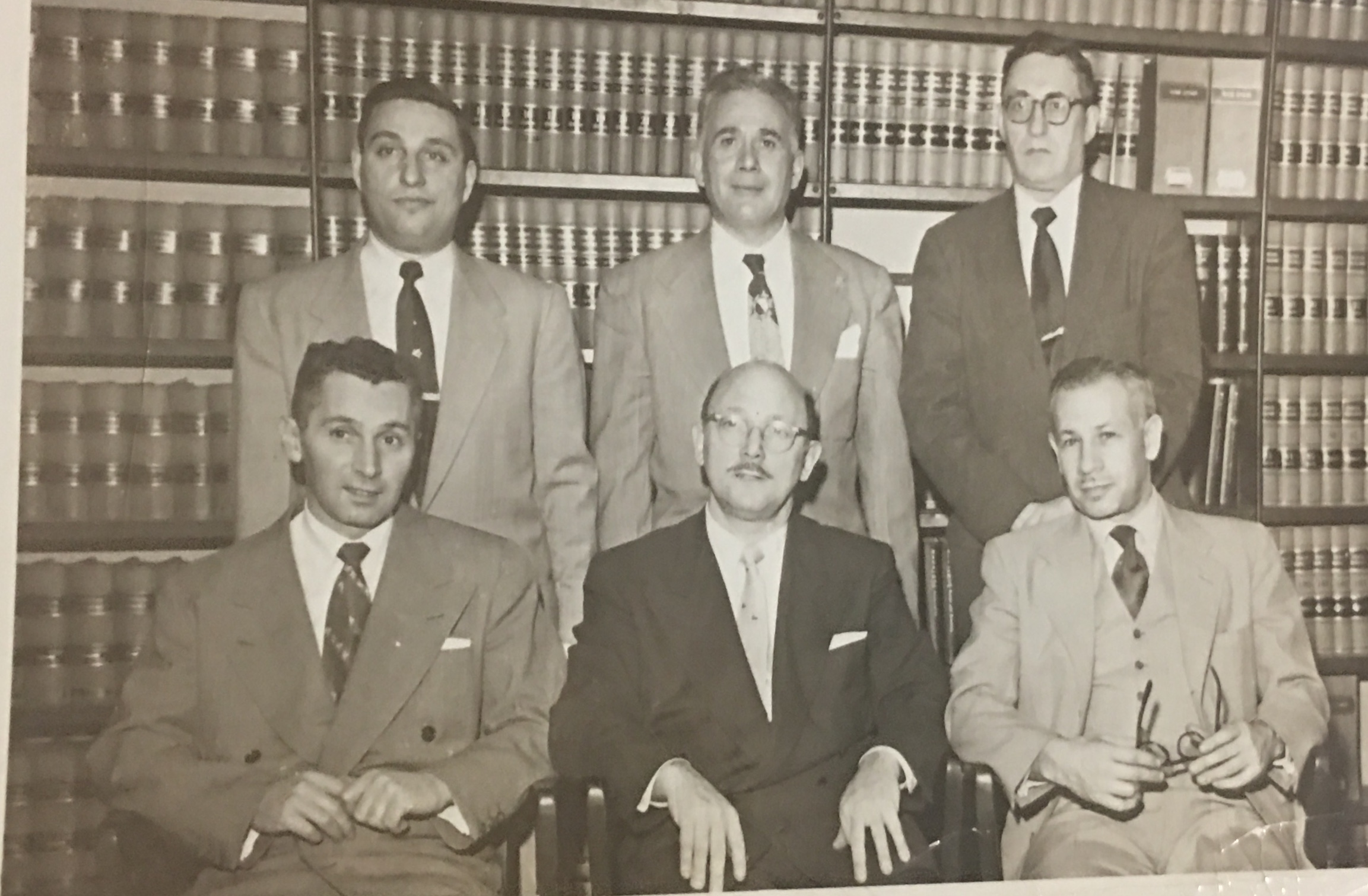
- Harry Kraf (bottom row, center)

Member of the New York State Senate
- In office 1956–1965

Member of the New York State Assembly
- In office 1967–1972

Judge of the New York City Civil Court
- In office 1972–?

Personal details
- Born: January 1, 1907 New York City, U.S.
- Died: December 22, 1989 (aged 82) Bronx, New York, U.S.
- Party: Democratic
- Spouse: Lena Ruth Rosenfeld (m. 1931)
- Children: Elaine Kraf
- Profession: Lawyer, politician

Harry Kraf (January 1, 1907 – December 22, 1989) was an American lawyer, judge, and Democratic politician from New York. Over the course of his career, he served in both the New York State Senate and the New York State Assembly, where he focused on issues such as traffic safety and air pollution. Later, he was elected to the New York City Civil Court, where he served until his retirement.

== Life ==
He was born on January 1, 1907, in New York City. He attended Public School No. 3 and Morris High School, both in the Bronx. He graduated LL.B. from Fordham Law School, and was admitted to the bar in 1929. He practiced law in New York City, and entered politics as a Democrat. He married Lena Ruth Rosenfeld on June 10, 1931, in New York City. They had one daughter, the novelist Elaine Kraf and one granddaughter, Milena Altman Kraf.

Kraf was elected in November 1955 to the New York State Senate, to fill the vacancy caused by the death of John J. Donovan, Jr., and took his seat in the 170th New York State Legislature at the beginning of the session of 1956. He was re-elected several times and remained in the Senate until 1965, sitting in the 171st, 172nd, 173rd, 174th and 175th New York State Legislatures. In September 1965, after re-apportionment, Kraf ran for re-nomination in the 37th District, but was defeated in the Democratic primary by Archie A. Gorfinkel. In January 1966, Kraf was appointed as counsel to a legislative committee.

He was a member of the New York State Assembly (75th D.) from 1967 to 1972, sitting in the 177th, 178th and 179th New York State Legislatures. In the Assembly, Kraf was known for working on traffic and air pollution problems. He also joined with his Bronx legislative colleagues in 1967 in an attempt to save St. Francis Hospital. In November 1972, he was elected to the New York City Civil Court.

He died on December 22, 1989, in Montefiore Medical Center in the Bronx. He was Jewish.

== Sources ==
New York State Senate
Preceded by John J. Donovan, Jr.	New York State Senate; 26th District; 1956–1965	Succeeded by Whitney North Seymour, Jr.
New York State Assembly
Preceded by Jose Ramos-Lopez	New York State Assembly; 75th District; 1967–1972	Succeeded by Eugenio Alvarez
