= Mario M. DeOptatis =

American lawyer and politician

Mario M. DeOptatis (January 26, 1903 – January 28, 1979) was an American lawyer and politician from New York.

== Life ==
He was born on January 26, 1903, in New York City. He attended Public School No. 112, New York University, Fordham Law School and Brooklyn Law School.

DeOptatis was a member of the New York State Senate (14th D.) from 1949 to 1954, sitting in the 167th, 168th and 169th New York State Legislatures.

He died on January 28, 1979.

New York State Senate
Preceded by Joseph E. Parisi	New York State Senate; 14th District; 1949–1954	Succeeded by John F. Furey
