= Robert C. McEwen =

American politician

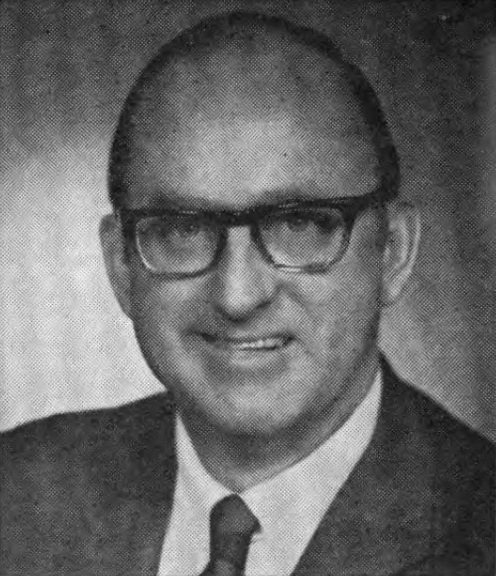

Member of the U.S. House of Representatives from New York
- In office January 3, 1965 – January 3, 1981
- Preceded by: Clarence E. Kilburn
- Succeeded by: David O'Brien Martin
- Constituency: 31st district (1965–73); 30th district (1973–81)

Member of the New York State Senate from the 40th district
- In office January 1, 1955 – December 31, 1964
- Preceded by: Walter Van Wiggeren
- Succeeded by: John E. Quinn

Member of the New York State Senate from the 39th district
- In office January 1, 1954 – December 31, 1954
- Preceded by: Paul D. Graves
- Succeeded by: Gilbert T. Seelye

Personal details
- Born: January 5, 1920 Ogdensburg, New York, U.S.
- Died: June 15, 1997 (aged 77) Ogdensburg, New York, U.S.
- Party: Republican

Robert Cameron McEwen (January 5, 1920 – June 15, 1997) was a Republican member of the United States House of Representatives from New York.

== Biography ==
McEwen was born on January 5, 1920, in Ogdensburg, St. Lawrence County, New York. He attended the University of Vermont and the Wharton School of the University of Pennsylvania, He served in the United States Army Air Forces from 1942 to 1946, and attained the rank of sergeant. McEwen graduated from Albany Law School in 1947, was admitted to the bar and practiced in Ogdensburg.

He was elected to the New York State Senate on January 5, 1954, and remained in the State Senate until 1964, sitting in the 169th, 170th, 171st, 172nd, 173rd and 174th New York State Legislatures. He was elected as a Republican to the 89th, 90th, 91st, 92nd, 93rd, 94th, 95th and 96th United States Congresses, holding office from January 3, 1965, to January 3, 1981. He did not run for reelection in 1980. In 1981, McEwen was appointed by Ronald Reagan to the International Joint Commission, and he served until 1989.

McEwen died in Ogdensburg on June 15, 1997.

New York State Senate
Preceded by Paul D. Graves	New York State Senate; 39th District; 1954	Succeeded by Gilbert T. Seelye
Preceded by Walter Van Wiggeren	New York State Senate; 40th District; 1955–1964	Succeeded by John E. Quinn
U.S. House of Representatives
Preceded by Clarence E. Kilburn	Member of the U.S. House of Representatives from New York's 31st congressional district 1965–1973	Succeeded by Donald J. Mitchell
Preceded by Carleton J. King	Member of the U.S. House of Representatives from New York's 30th congressional district 1973–1981	Succeeded by David O'Brien Martin
