= Searles G. Shultz =

American lawyer and politician (1897–1976)

Searles Gregory Shultz (April 29, 1897 – January 23, 1976) was an American lawyer and Republican politician from New York. He served in the New York State Assembly from 1947 to 1954 and in the New York Senate from 1955 to 1958. Before entering the legislature, he held several local civic and legal offices in Onondaga County. He was a veteran of World War I and contributed to the home front effort during World Ward II.

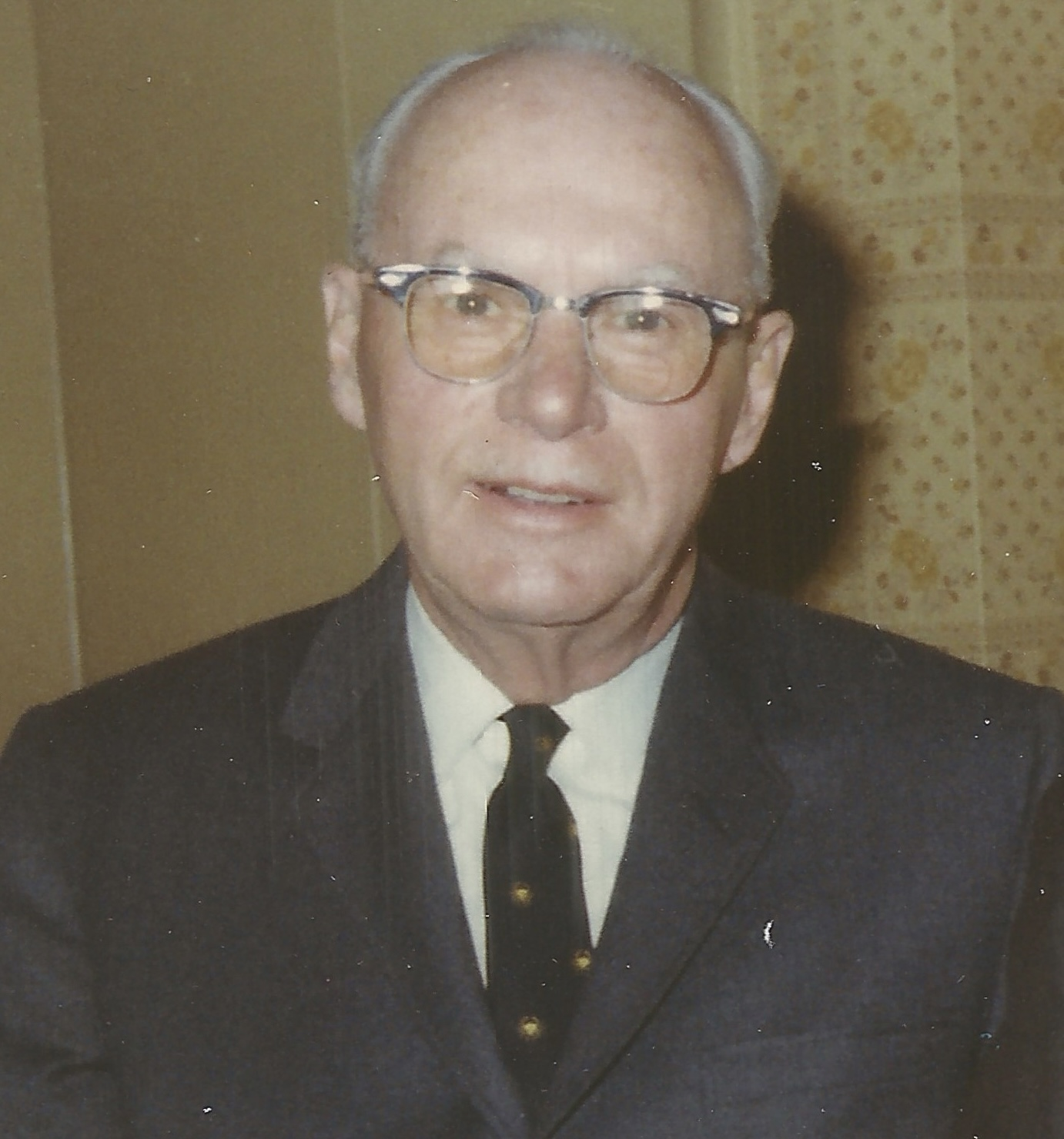
Searles G. Shultz, family photograph.

== Early life and education ==
He was born on April 29, 1897, in Skaneateles, Onondaga County, New York. He graduated from Skaneateles High School in 1916. During World War I he served in the U.S. Army. He earned his law degree from Cornell Law School in 1921.

== Career ==
Shultz practiced law and served as a town attorney and justice of the peace, taking part in local government and small town judicial work. He married Dorothy Hall (1898–1978), and they had three children.

He was elected to the New York State Assembly as a Republican, representing Onondoga County. He served in the Assembly from 1947 to 1954, sitting in the 166th, 167th, 168th and 169th New York State Legislatures.

He was a member of the New York State Senate representing the 44th District from 1955 to 1958, sitting in the 170th and 171st New York State Legislatures. In January 1957 he was named chairman of the Senate Committee on Revision and Engrossed Bills, succeeding Senator Harry K. Morton in that role.

He died on January 23, 1976, after being struck by a vehicle during winter storm conditions and was buried at the Lakeview Cemetery in Skaneateles.

His daughter Juanita (Shultz) Newell (1929–2013) was for 28 years the Town Clerk of Skaneateles.

== Sources ==
New York State Assembly
Preceded by Leo W. Breed	New York State Assembly; Onondaga County, 1st District; 1947–1954	Succeeded by Lawrence M. Rulison
New York State Senate
Preceded by Wheeler Milmoe	New York State Senate; 44th District; 1955–1958	Succeeded by Lawrence M. Rulison
