= Charles V. Scanlan =

American lawyer and politician (1893–1964)

Member of the New York Senate from the 28th district
- In office January 1, 1947 – December 31, 1950

Personal details
- Born: January 22, 1893 New York City
- Died: May 2, 1964 (aged 71) The Bronx, New York City

Military service
- Allegiance: United States
- Branch/service: United States Navy
- Years of service: 1917–1918
- Battles/wars: World War I

Charles V. Scanlan (January 22, 1893 – May 2, 1964) was an American lawyer and politician from New York.

== Personal life ==
He was born on January 22, 1893, in New York City. He grew up in the Bronx. During World War I, he served in the U.S. Navy. He practiced law in New York City and entered politics as a Republican.

In 1939, he ran unsuccessfully for the New York City Council. He was a member of the New York State Senate (28th D.) from 1947 to 1950, sitting in the 166th and 167th New York State Legislatures. In November 1950, he ran for re-election, but was defeated by Democrat Francis J. McCaffrey. Scanlan was also defeated in 1952 running for the State Senate; and in 1954 and 1958 running for Congress in New York's 24th congressional district.

He died on May 2, 1964, in Calvary Hospital in the Bronx, of cancer.

New York State Senate
Preceded by Lowell H. Brown	New York State Senate; 28th District; 1947–1950	Succeeded by Francis J. McCaffrey
