= Frank J. Becker =

American politician from New York State (1899–1981)

Frank John Becker
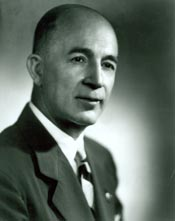

Member of the U.S. House of Representatives from New York
- In office January 3, 1953 – January 3, 1965
- Preceded by: Henry J. Latham
- Succeeded by: Herbert Tenzer
- Constituency: 3rd district (1953–63); 5th district (1963–65)

Member of the New York State Assembly from the 1st Nassau district
- In office January 1, 1945 – December 31, 1952
- Preceded by: John D. Bennett
- Succeeded by: John G. Herrmann

Personal details
- Born: August 27, 1899 Brooklyn, New York, US
- Died: October 4, 1981 (aged 82) Lynbrook, New York, US
- Party: Republican Party
- Spouse: Anne Claire Ferris Becker
- Children: 3
- Education: Brown's Business College

Military service
- Allegiance: United States
- Branch/service: United States Army
- Battles/wars: World War I

Frank John Becker (August 27, 1899 – September 4, 1981) was an American business executive and politician. A member of the Republican Party, he served five terms in the New York State Assembly and six terms in the United States House of Representatives from New York.

== Early life ==
Becker was born in Brooklyn to Maximilian and Eva (Sperling) Becker. He moved with his parents to Lynbrook, Nassau County, Long Island, in November 1905. He attended the public schools of Lynbrook and Brown's Business College, Jamaica, Long Island.

During World War I, Becker enlisted in the United States Army on July 22, 1918, and served until September 22, 1919. He founded a real estate and insurance business in Lynbrook, New York, and was also chairman emeritus of the board of directors of the Suburbia Federal Savings and Loan Association in Garden City.

== Political career ==
Becker was elected to the New York State Assembly in 1944, representing the 1st district in Nassau County and won four more elections before running for the United States House of Representatives. He served in the 165th, 166th, 167th and 168th New York State Legislatures.

In 1952, he was elected to Congress with a 67,000-vote margin. The following election, he was re-elected by more than 45,000 votes. He made headlines in 1964 when he introduced an amendment to the United States Constitution that would allow prayer in schools. In 1962 and 1963, the United States Supreme Court ruled in Engel v. Vitale and Abington School District v. Schempp that mandatory prayer in public schools was unconstitutional. Becker spoke about the amendment saying that he wanted to save the nation from a “curse which has befallen all civilizations that forgot and disobeyed God Almighty.” His measure was voted down.

He later introduced legislation to allow American military courts to try members of the armed services for crimes committed overseas rather than in foreign courts.

He retired from Congress and did not run for re-election in 1964, citing a desire to spend more time with his family and to make room for younger candidates. His margins of victory narrowed in the years leading to his retirement.

Becker voted in favor of the Civil Rights Acts of 1957, 1960, and 1964, as well as the 24th Amendment to the U.S. Constitution.

Becker was a delegate to the 1952, 1956, 1960 and 1964 Republican National Conventions.

== Personal life ==
He married Anne Claire Ferris on June 30, 1923, and they had three children: Francis X. Becker, who became a justice of the New York Supreme Court on Long Island, Robert G., and Elizabeth Ann. He was an active member in the Veterans of Foreign Wars, the American Legion, and the Knights of Columbus.

Becker died in Lynbrook, New York, on September 4, 1981 (age 82 years, 8 days). He is interred at Long Island National Cemetery, near Farmingdale, Long Island, New York. His family became involved in politics. In addition to his son Francis, his son Robert was the head of the Nassau County Republican Party for 25 years, his grandson, Gregory Becker, was a member of the New York Assembly while another grandson, Francis X. Becker Jr., was a member of the Nassau County Legislature who ran for both the New York State Senate and the U.S. House of Representatives against Rep. Carolyn McCarthy.

New York State Assembly
Preceded by John D. Bennett	New York State Assembly; Nassau County, 1st District; 1945–1952	Succeeded by John G. Herrmann
U.S. House of Representatives
Preceded by Henry J. Latham	Member of the U.S. House of Representatives from New York's 3rd congressional district 1953–1963	Succeeded by Steven Derounian
Preceded by Joseph P. Addabbo	Member of the U.S. House of Representatives from New York's 5th congressional district 1963–1965	Succeeded by Herbert Tenzer
