= Richmond Hill High School (Queens) =

Public school in New York City

Coordinates: 40°41′42″N 73°50′01″W

- 89-30 114th Street; Richmond Hill, Queens, New York City, NY 11418

Information
- Superintendent: David Norment
- Principal: Tarek Alamarie
- Grades: 9–12
- Enrollment: 1,576 _{(2018–2019)}
- Color
- Mascot: Lion
- Newspaper: Domino, Dome
- Yearbook: Archway
- Website: www.richmondhillhs.org

Richmond Hill High School is a four-year public high school in Richmond Hill, Queens, New York City, part of the New York City Department of Education.

== History ==
Richmond Hill High School was founded in 1899, one year after Queens became part of New York City, in the then-bucolic setting of Richmond Hill. As such, it is the oldest high school south of Jamaica Avenue in Queens, New York City. Its first principal was Isaac Newton Failor (1851 to 1925), author of the longtime school book "Inventional Geometry" in 1904. He built an observatory on top of the building open to the students. The high school shared its facility with a local elementary school on the then Johnson Avenue. In 1899, the first students were admitted to the Johnson Avenue site, and in 1919 the current site was opened on 114th street. It has been voted the 100 U.S. Best High School in 2005. Today, the school is identified by the New York State Department of Education as one of the most persistently low achieving schools within the Department of Education. In 2024, the school, with its new principal, Tarek Alamarie, implemented new programs, such as a hydroponics lab, an Army JROTC program and a culinary class. The school also offers many CollegeNOW courses to make students college and career ready. It has since been striving to prove that it is one of the top High Schools, not only in Richmond Hill alone, but in New York City.

The school, built to accommodate 1,800 students, had reached an enrollment of 3,600 for the 2007–2008 school year, severely straining the school's ability to serve its students. The school's population has declined to 2,300 students.

Richmond Hill High School was among over two dozen schools due to be closed from June 2012 due to persistently low academic performance. According to the schools last progress report, only 58% of all students were able to graduate on time, leaving many students to drop out. Responding to low academic performance, the Department of Education hired a company called "High Schools that Work" at a cost of $700,000 to help "turn around" the schools performance with little or no results. In addition to hiring a company to manage "turnaround", the Department of Education planned to develop a new school at the site called the 21st Century School of Richmond Hill to improve the school. The new school would have a literacy and technology focus designed to interest students in internet based academic work.

== Recognition ==
- Rudolph Giuliani, Mayor of New York, proclaimed September 24, 1997, as "Richmond Hill High School Day".

== Notable alumni ==
- Fred Trump (1905–1999), American real estate developer and businessman
- John G. Trump (1907-1985), American electrical engineer, inventor, physicist and professor at the Massachusetts Institute of Technology
- Pauli Murray (1910–1985) class of 1927, pioneer in Civil & Women's Rights. Inspired Ruth Bader Ginsburg & Thurgood Marshall
- Anthony Joseph Cardinal Bevilacqua (1923–2012), the Bishop of Pittsburgh from 1983 to 1987 and Archbishop of Philadelphia from 1987 to 2003, and was raised to the cardinalate in 1991.
- Pop Smoke (July 20, 1999 – February 19, 2020), Rapper
- Rodney Dangerfield (1921–2004), comedian, graduated in 1939.
- Albert Dekker (1905–1968), actor and politician
- Seymour Halpern (1913–1997), represented New York in Congress from 1959 to 1973.
- Frank Kameny (1925–2011, class of 1941), LGBT rights activist.
- Herb Karpel, Major League Baseball player
- Cyndi Lauper (born 1953), singer and composer (expelled)
- Michael R. Long (1940–2022), former chairman of the Conservative Party of New York State
- Phil Rizzuto (1917–2007), baseball player and commentator
- Marius Russo (1914–2005), baseball player
