= Thompson M. Scoon =

American farmer and politician

Thompson Maxwell Scoon (August 29, 1888 – July 27, 1953) was an American farmer and politician from New York.

== Life ==
He was born on August 29, 1888, in Geneva, Ontario County, New York. He graduated from Cornell University. He was President of the Geneva Preserving Company and a director of the Geneva Trust Company. Later he engaged in farming in Seneca. He married Elizabeth Bacon, and their only child was Thompson M. Scoon Jr. (1924–2003).

Scoon was for eight years Chairman of the Ontario County Civil Service Commission; and a member of the New York State Assembly (Ontario Co.) from 1951 until his death in 1953, sitting in the 168th and 169th New York State Legislatures.

He died on July 27, 1953, in Thompson Hospital in Canandaigua, New York.

== Sources ==
New York State Assembly
| Preceded by Harry R. Marble | New York State Assembly; Ontario County; 1951–1953 | Succeeded by Robert M. Quigley |
