= Daniel G. Albert =

American lawyer and politician

Justice of the New York Supreme Court
- In office 1963–1977

Member of the New York State Senate from the 2nd district
- In office 1956–1962
- Preceded by: Edward P. Larkin
- Succeeded by: Norman F. Lent

Personal details
- Born: September 14, 1901 New York City, U.S.
- Died: August 14, 1983 (aged 81)
- Resting place: New Montefiore Cemetery, West Babylon, New York, U.S.
- Spouse: Sally
- Children: 2
- Profession: Politician, lawyer, judge

Daniel G. Albert (September 14, 1901 – August 14, 1983) was an American lawyer and politician from New York.

== Life ==
He was born on September 14, 1901, in Brooklyn, New York City. The family removed to Ellenville, Ulster County, New York, when Daniel was eight years old. He married Sally, and they had two daughters. Later he practiced law in Rockville Centre.

Albert was a member of the New York State Senate (2nd D.) from 1956 to 1962, sitting in the 170th, 171st, 172nd and 173rd New York State Legislatures. In November 1962, he was elected to the New York Supreme Court.

He was a justice of the Supreme Court (10th D.) from 1963 to 1977.

He died on August 14, 1983, and was buried at the New Montefiore Cemetery in West Babylon.

== Sources ==
New York State Senate
| Preceded by Edward P. Larkin | New York State Senate; 2nd District; 1956–1962 | Succeeded by Norman F. Lent |
