= Frederic E. Hammer =

American lawyer and politician

Frederic E. Hammer (April 7, 1909 – September 3, 1980) was an American lawyer and politician from New York.

== Life ==
He was born on April 7, 1909, in New York City. He attended the public schools and graduated from St. John's University.

Hammer was a member of the New York State Senate (5th D.) from 1945 to 1948, sitting in the 165th and 166th New York State Legislatures. In November 1948, he ran for re-election, but was defeated by Democrat James F. Fitzgerald.

He was an alternate delegate to the 1960 and 1964 Republican National Conventions. In September 1960, he was appointed by Governor Nelson Rockefeller to the Workmen's Compensation Board. In November 1963, he ran for D.A. of Queens County, but was defeated by Democrat Frank D. O'Connor.

Hammer was a judge of the New York City Civil Court until 1971, and a justice of the New York Supreme Court (11th D.) from 1972 until his death in 1980.

He died on September 3, 1980, at his home in Neponsit, Queens.

== Sources ==
New York State Senate
Preceded by William Kirnan	New York State Senate; 5th District; 1945–1948	Succeeded by James F. Fitzgerald
