= Francis J. McCaffrey =

American politician

Francis J. McCaffrey (September 16, 1917 – November 29, 1989) was an American lawyer and politician from New York.

== Life ==
He was born on September 16, 1917, in the Bronx, New York City. He attended Holy Spirit Parochial School and Fordham Preparatory School. He graduated from Cornell Law School in 1942. During World War II he served as an air gunner in the U.S. Army Air Force. He was an Assistant D.A. of Bronx County from 1946 to 1948. He married Irene B. O'Hara (1921–2000), and they had four children.

McCaffrey was a member of the New York State Senate from 1951 to 1956, sitting in the 168th, 169th and 170th New York State Legislatures. In November 1956, he ran for re-election, but was defeated by Republican Joseph F. Periconi.

McCaffrey was Commissioner of Records of the Surrogate Court of Bronx County until 1961, and afterwards engaged in private practice until his retirement in 1985.

He died on November 29, 1989, at his home in Riverdale, Bronx, of a stroke.

== Sources ==
New York State Senate
Preceded by Charles V. Scanlan	New York State Senate; 28th District; 1951–1954	Succeeded by Nathaniel T. Helman
Preceded by William F. Condon	New York State Senate; 29th District; 1955–1956	Succeeded by Joseph F. Periconi
