= Julius A. Archibald =

American lawyer and politician

- Born: 1901; Trinidad
- Died: 1979 (aged 77–78)
- Occupations: Lawyer, politician
- Known for: First African-American member of the New York Senate

Julius A. Archibald (1901 – 1979) was an American lawyer and politician from New York City. Archibald was a Democratic State Senator for one term (169th New York State Legislature) from 1953 to 1954. He ran on a civil rights platform and was a member of the NAACP. He was born in Trinidad. Archibald defeated Harold I. Panken in the Democratic primary for the 21st district, which covered part of New York City. He won the general election and was the first African-American member of the New York Senate. He was replaced by James Lopez Watson.
