= Thomas J. Runfola =

American politician

Member of the New York State Assembly from Erie's 1st district
- In office January 1, 1951 – December 31, 1958
- Preceded by: Leonard S. Capizzi
- Succeeded by: Stephen R. Greco

Personal details
- Born: April 12, 1907 Buffalo, New York
- Died: March 1980 (aged 72)
- Party: Republican

Thomas J. Runfola (April 12, 1907 – March 1980) was an American politician who served in the New York State Assembly from Erie's 1st district from 1951 to 1958.
