= Milton Koerner =

American politician (1910–1980)

Milton Koerner (1910-1980) was a Republican State Senator for the New York State Senate 5th District from 1953 to 1954. Running for re-election in the 6th district in 1954, he lost to Democrat and Liberal candidate James J. Crisona.

In 1955, he ran for Municipal Court in the 5th district, but lost to the Democratic candidate, A. R. Margulies.

He graduated from Brooklyn Law School in 1931.

From 1960 to 1969 he was associate counsel for the New York State Liquor Authority. A Queens resident, in 1970, he was the New York State Tax Commissioner and until shortly before his death a member of the New York State Tax Commission.
