= William G. Giaccio =

American politician

Member of the New York State Assembly from Queens's 5th district
- In office January 1, 1949 – December 31, 1962
- Preceded by: Thomas F. Hurley
- Succeeded by: Martin M. Psaty

Personal details
- Born: March 8, 1924 Queens, New York City, New York
- Died: January 30, 2000 (aged 75)
- Party: Democratic

William G. Giaccio (March 8, 1924 – January 30, 2000) was an American politician who served in the New York State Assembly from Queens's 5th district from 1949 to 1962.
