= New York State Council on the Arts =

Arts council serving the U.S. state of New York

The New York State Council on the Arts (NYSCA) serves to foster and advance the arts, culture, and creativity throughout New York State, according to its website. The goal of the council is to allow all New Yorkers to benefit from the contributions the arts give to the state of New York through its communities, education, economic growth, and daily life. Its funding encompasses various artistic fields, such as literary, visual, media, performing arts, specifically focusing on art education and the underserved communities.

The NYSCA prioritizes diverse communities, providing inclusive and fair participation in the arts for people of all ages and backgrounds, opportunities for those who want to experience the arts and cultural offerings, the impacts of arts and culture on all aspects of life, the transformation of art and its creative practices, and creativity as an asset.

It was established in 1960 through a bill introduced in the New York State Legislature by New York State Senator MacNeil Mitchell (1905–1996), with backing from Governor Nelson Rockefeller, and began its work in 1961. It awards more than 1,600 grants annually to arts, culture, and heritage non-profits and artists throughout the state. Its headquarters are in Manhattan, New York City.

== Values ==
- The diversity within New York's communities
- Equitable participation for people of all ages and backgrounds
- The ability for everyone to access the arts and culture
- Valuing the arts and the culture as they play a crucial role in the economy and health of the people
- The progression and growth of the arts and creativity.
- Treating creativity as a shared, beneficial asset within the community

=== Budget system ===
The New York State's annual budget accounts for NYSCA's funding, and operates on a fiscal year of April - March. In the fiscal year of 2023 (FY2023) was a total of $222.50 million in funding, with $90 million grants towards organizations and artists. These grants cover general operating costs for creative projects, performances, activities, programs, and artist's individual work. The remaining amount, $132.5 million, is funded towards capital projects for long-term assets such as physical infrastructures that involve supporting and sustaining related organizations and programs. In FY2025, a total of $162 million in grants were awarded, with $82 million towards organizations and artists, and $80 million towards capital project funds.

New York State Council on the Arts Board
Name	Occupation	County
Monica Angle	Artist, Educator	Erie
Lisa Baker	Art Director, Curator, Non-Profit Founder	Westchester/Fairfield
Lawrence H. Cook II	Senior Vice President of Programs, John R. Oishei Foundation	Erie
Carolee Fink	Principal, MSquared	New York
Aaron Flagg	Musician. Chair and Associate Director of Juilliard Jazz Studies	Westchester
Janet Kagan	Theater Producer	New York
Joan Hornig	Designer & entrepreneur	New York
Eric Latzky	Founder, Eric Latzky Culture Communications NY	New York
James Lemons	Executive Director, Lake Placid Center for the Arts	Essex
Laudelina Martinez	Gallery owner, Consultant, Professor	Rensselaer
David Alan Miller	Conductor, Albany Symphony Orchestra.	Albany
Mahnaz Moinian	Academic	New York
Katherine Nicholls	Publishing CEO, NYSCA Council Chairperson	Nassau
Catherine Schwoeffermann	Executive Director, Hoyt Foundation	Broome
Elsie McCabe Thompson	President, New York City Mission Society	New York
Adriana Trigiani	Author, Screenwriter, Filmmaker	New York

== NYSCA Guidelines for Grant Opportunities ==
=== Small scale and midsized grants ===
These grants fund organizations of any size, with up to $2 million in funding. These fundings are used towards structural and historical improvements, cultural development, health and safety, sustainability, accessibility, and artistry.

Guideline and Application Manual: https://nysca.org/downloads/files/FY2025_NYSCA_CapSmallMidGuidelines.pdf

=== Large scale grants ===
These grants ranging from $2–10 million for projects that cost a total of $4 million or more, support large-scale capital improvements. Large scale fundings are used to expand cultural programming, increase accessibility, economic development, equity, and diversity.

Guideline and Application Manual: https://nysca.org/downloads/files/FY2025_NYSCA_CapLargeGuidelines.pdf

== Staff ==
Executive Staff

- Executive Director: Erika Mallin
- Deputy Director of Operations: Karen Welch, (212) 459-8812
- Deputy Director of Programs: Megan White, (212) 459-8806

Staff

- Chief of Staff: Abby Adler, (212) 459-8808
- Program Officer | Arts Education | Multidisciplinary: Kavie Barnes, (212) 459-8858
- Program Director | Individual Artists | Multidisciplinary: Arian Blanco, (212) 459-8815
- Director of Agency Operations/HR Liaison: Brenda K. Brown, (212) 459-8827
- Operations Team Associate: Ian Byrne, (212) 459-8821
- Program Team Associate: Kimalea Campbell, (212)-459-8832
- Program Officer | Individual Artists | Theatre: Orin Chait, (212) 459-8835
- Program Director | Electronic Media & Film | Folk Arts: Fabiana Chiu-Rinaldi, (212) 459-8828
- Director of Grants Management and Information Technology: Lenn Savoca Ditman, (212) 459-8810
- Operations Team Associate: Omar Estrada, (212) 459-8852
- Operations Team Associate: Marnee Geller, (212) 459-8819
- Program Director | Architecture + Design | Museum: Kristin Herron, (212) 459-8825
- Program Director | Theatre and Visual Arts: David Huff, (212) 459-8831
- Program Director | Arts Education | Literature: Christine Leahy, (212) 459-8818
- Program Associate, Grants Management & Compliance: Claudine Lee, (212) 459-8829
- Auditor: Totlyn Lewis, (212) 459-8822
- Program Officer | Dance | Theatre: Deborah Lim, (212) 459-8820
- Director of Financial and Grant Systems: William McDermott, (212) 459-8855
- Program Director | Music and Presenting: Zatara McIntyre, (212) 459-8826
- Operations Team Associate: Gabi Nail, (212) 459-8811
- Facilities Manager: Jerry Pecchia, (212) 459-8814
- Program Officer | Music | Visual Arts: Rita Putnam, (212) 459-8830
- Communications Director: Ann Marie Sekeres, (212) 459-8859
- Program Director | Capital Projects: Katie Steger, (212) 459-8851
- Program Director | Dance | State & Local Partnership: Leanne Tintori, (212) 459-8816
- Program Officer | Capital Projects: Lindsay Turley, (212) 459-8854

=== NYSCA Community Regrant Partners ===
NYSCA's local grant making organization, Statewide Community Regrant Partners (SCR), is a partnership between the state council and regional arts councils and organizations. The partnership enables funding through all 10 regions across New York, to provide support through various art sectors.

Statewide Community Regrant Partners	County	Website
Adirondack Lakes Center for Arts	Clinton, Essex, Franklin, and Hamilton	http://www.adirondackarts.org/
Arts Council for Wyoming County	Alleghany and Wyoming	http://artswyco.org/
Arts Council of the Southern Finger Lakes	Cattaraugus, Chemung, Schuyler, Steuben, and Tioga	http://www.earts.org/
Arts Mid-Hudson	Dutchess, Ulster and Orange	http://artsmidhudson.org/
Bronx Council on the Arts	Bronx	http://www.bronxarts.org/
Brooklyn Arts Council	Kings	http://www.brooklynartscouncil.org/
Community Arts Partnership	Tompkins	http://www.artspartner.org/
Delaware Valley Arts Alliance	Sullivan	http://delawarevalleyartsalliance.org/
Genesee-Orleans Regional Arts Council	Genesee and Orleans	https://www.goart.org/
CREATE	Columbia, Greene, and Schoharie	http://www.greenearts.org/
Huntington Arts Council	Nassau and Suffolk	http://www.huntingtonarts.org/
Genesee Valley Council on the Arts	Serves Livingston and Monroe Counties	www.gvartscouncil.org
Lower Adirondack Regional Arts Council	Warren and Washington	http://www.larac.org/
Lower Manhattan Cultural Council	New York	http://lmcc.net/
Putnam Arts Council	Putnam	http://putnamartscouncil.com/
Flushing Town Hall	Queens	https://www.flushingtownhall.org/
Roxbury Arts Group	Delaware	http://roxburyartsgroup.org/
Saratoga County Arts Council	Saratoga, Fulton, and Montgomery	http://www.saratoga-arts.org/
St. Lawrence County Arts Council	Jefferson, Lewis and St. Lawrence	http://slcartscouncil.org/grants/
Council on the Arts for Staten Island	Richmond	https://statenislandarts.org

== Regrant partners ==
The list below are grantees that NYSCA partners with to administer funding in the form of regrants. These fundings aid artists, media art practitioners, theatres, museums, organizations, historic sites, historic preservation, and the development and creation of the arts.

Grantees	Website
NYSCA/American Dance Asylum: NYS Choreographers Initiative	https://www.americandanceasylum.org/new-york-state-choreographer-s-initiative.html
NYSCA/Arts Council for Wyoming County: Rural & Traditional Arts Fellowships	https://artswyco.org/rural-and-traditional-arts-fellowship.html
NYSCA/Architectural League of NY: Independent Projects Grants	https://archleague.org/competition/independent-projects-2022/
NYSCA/A.R.T. NY: Creative Opportunity Fund	https://www.art-newyork.org/2023-creative-opportunity-fund
NYSCA/CLMP: NYSCA NYTAP Regrant Program	https://www.clmp.org/programs-opportunities/nytap/
NYSCA/CNY Arts: Museums Professional Development Grant	https://cnyarts.org/grants/nysca-museums-professional-development/
NYSCA/GHHN: Conservation Treatment	https://www.greaterhudson.org/conservation-treatment-grant.html
NYSCA/Just Buffalo: LitNYS Literary Advancement Regrants	http://www.littap.org/
NYSCA/New York Council on Nonprofits (NYCON)	https://www.nycon.org/
NYSCA/NY Folklore: Professional Development	https://nyfolklore.org/services/mentoring/
NYSCA/NYFA: Artist Fellowship	https://www.nyfa.org/awards-grants/artist-fellowships/
NYSCA/NYFA: Professional Development Partnership Program	https://www.nyfa.org/professional-development/
NYSCA/NYS DanceForce (DF)	https://www.danceforce.org/
NYSCA/Poets & Writers: Readings & Workshops	https://www.pw.org/funding/funding_readingsworkshops
NYSCA/Preservation League of NYS: Preserve New York	https://www.preservenys.org/preserve-new-york
NYSCA/Preservation League of NYS: Technical Assistance Grants	https://www.preservenys.org/technical-assistance-grants
NYSCA/Wave Farm: Arts in Corrections NYS	https://wavefarm.org/grants-services/nysca-regrants
NYSCA/Wave Farm: Media Arts Assistance Fund (MAAF)	https://wavefarm.org/grants-services/nysca-regrants
