= Foner =

Foner is a surname. Notable people with the surname include:

- Eric Foner (born 1943), American historian and former head of the American Historical Association; son of Jack D. Foner
- Henry Foner (1919–2017), AKA "Harry Foner," American trade union activist; brother of Jack D. Foner, Moe Foner, Philip S. Foner
- Henry Foner (chemist) (1932), Israeli chemist and writer
- Jack D. Foner (1910–1999), American historian; brother of Moe Foner and Harry Foner and twin brother of Philip S. Foner; father of Eric Foner
- Moe Foner (1916–2002), American trade union activist; brother of Jack D. Foner and Philip S. Foner
- Nancy Foner, American sociologist: daughter of Moe Foner
- Philip S. Foner (1910–1994), historian and political activist; author and editor of over 100 books; brother of Moe Foner and Harry Foner and twin brother of Jack D. Foner
