= Morris U. Cohen =

American professor of chemistry

- Born: January 18, 1910?
- Died: July 16, 1989?
- Citizenship: American
- Occupations: Professor, Chemist
- Known for: Dismissed 1941 from CCNY; alleged Soviet spy

Academic background
- Education: City College of New York
- Alma mater: Columbia University
- Thesis: (1935)

Academic work
- Discipline: Chemistry

Morris U. Cohen (January 18, 1910? – July 16, 1989?) was an American professor of chemistry, dismissed in 1941 from the City College of New York (CCNY) following investigations by the Rapp-Coudert Committee and accused of Soviet espionage during 1953 hearings of the U.S. Senate Internal Security Subcommittee (SISS).

== Background ==
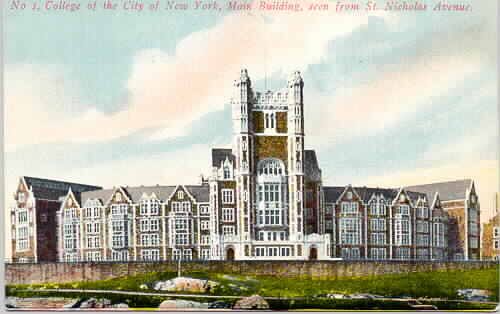
Original entrance to Shepard Hall, main building of City College of New York, early 1900s, where Morris U. Cohen studied and taught

In 1930, Morris U. Cohen received a BS from City College of New York. In 1932, he earned an MA and in 1935 a doctorate from Columbia University.

== Career ==
In 1930, Cohen began teaching at City College of New York through 1941. He also taught at the New York Workers School and its successor the Jefferson School of Social Science. He later said, "Only a boy named Cohen could know what it meant to me to be offered a chance to teach at City College."

On May 23, 1939, Cohen was re-elected to the executive board of the New York College Teachers Union under new president Alonzo Myers of New York University (NYU), new board member Nellie R. Lederman, and incumbents Morris U. Schappes, George S. Counts, Robert Challman Henrietta Apfel, Samuel L. Hamilton, and Clinton W. Keyes.

=== 1941 Rapp-Coudert ===
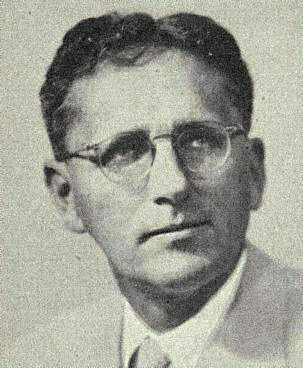
New York State Senator Frederic René Coudert Jr. led the trial against Morris U. Cohen et al.

On May 12, 1941, as the Board of Higher Education dismissed the first of fourteen teachers, David Goldway, from his position and vacated it, three of the remaining teachers had accusations of Communist affiliation made at them: Morris U. Cohen, Louis Balamuth, and Jack D. Foner.

On July 17, 1941, the Board of Higher Education announced trial dates for suspended teachers: Morris U. Cohen's was set for August 7.

On August 6, 1941, William Martin Canning, English faculty at the City College of New York, testified that Morris U. Cohen frequently attended meetings of the "college unit" of the Communist Party USA. Canning said that the Party's college unit had organized at CCNY in 1936 and peaked at fifty members.

On August 7, 1941, New York State Senator Frederic René Coudert Jr. of the Rapp-Coudert Committee warned William G. Mulligan, counsel for the New York City Teachers Union and of the New York College Teachers Union, that his clients would receive only five minutes to speak. When Mulligan objected, Coudert threatened to remove him from the court. The issue was whether four CCNY teachers taught "Communist dogma" in their classes. Professor Edwin B. Burgum admitted that he had been editor of Science and Society, a "Marxian quarterly," but denied being a Marxist. The other three teachers – David Cohen, Morris U. Cohen, and Sidney Eisenberger – waived immunity and testified that they were not Communist Party members. Morris U. Cohen added that he was a member of the Teachers Union. The same day, the committee "virtually forced the Board of Higher Education to adjourn the trial of Morris U. Cohen, suspended chemistry teacher yesterday because Dr. Cohen was prepared to produce documentary evidence of the graft and corruption at City College." Samuel A. Neuberger, Cohen's attorney, who produced the information for his client, complained that the Coudert committee was planning to portray itself as "first disclosers of financial irregularities at the institution which his client has devote much of his time to eliminating." Witnesses appearing before the committee included: Edwin Berry Burgum, David Cohen, Morris U. Cohen, Sidney Eisenberger, Sylvia Elfbein, Moses I. Finkelstein (Moses Finley), and Jack D. Foner. As part of graft and corruption allegations, Cohen charged that "certain members of the chemistry department (of City College) have persistently favored purchase of chemicals and supplies and equipment from Nazi-controlled firms." Cohen, then under suspension for communist activity, found his trial brought to "an abrupt adjournment" just as he was about to introduce evidence regarding sale of Kemkit chemistry kits to students.

On August 12, 1941, the Brooklyn Eagle ran a top headline that read "$200,000 College Monopoly Laid to Boro Teacher and 2." Nathan H. Hecht, attorney and partner in the Kemkit Chemical Corporation made the charges. During the same hearing, Morris U. Cohen announced that he "had planned to disclose the kit racket in his own defense."

On August 13, 1941, the Rapp-Coudert Committee finally listened to the charges of graft and corruption in the City College of New York chemistry department submitted in the Spring by Cohen. Chemical kits sold to students at the City College of New York, Brooklyn College, and Queens College came from Kemkit Chemical Corporation, whose chairman was David Hart (chair of chemistry at Brooklyn College); Frederick Weber, Charles Marlies, and W.G.C. Hubner (also in the chemistry department), and outsider Nathaniel Hecht. "Progressive teachers active in ferretting out this state of affairs in the chemistry department were subsequently suspended by the Board of Higher Education on the charge of 'Communism'." The Board of Higher Education announced it would take immediate action against three college professors who owned shares in the Kemkit Scientific Chemical Corporation of Brooklyn, whose products they were making students buy. At a Teachers Union meeting later that day, Cohen praised colleague Morris U. Schappes for helping the fight against Hitler and native-born fascists like Coudert: "When that is done, Morris Schappes will be back in the halls of learning using science and knowledge to build a better world." The next day, August 14, the committee heard testimony from Charles A. Marlies, who testified that Cohen had worked for Kemkit in 1927: "I guess maybe Morris U. Cohen told them," meaning the Coudert committee about Kemkit.

On August 18, 1941, the New York District of the American Student Union congratulated the TU's Committee for the Defense of Higher Education and Morris U. Cohen for exposing graft and corruption in the chemistry department of CCNY. On April 23, 1941, Bella Dodd, then chair of the Committee for the Defense of Higher Education of the New York City Teachers Union, announced that the Board of Higher Education had suspended eleven (11) more City College of New York teachers and administrators in addition to the first three teachers (Morris U. Schappes, John K. Ackley, and Arthur R. Braumlich): Jetta Alpert, Lewis Balamuth, Saul Bernstein, David Cohen, Morris U. Cohen, Sidney Eisenberger, Jack D. Foner, Louis Lerman, Samuel Margolis, Jesse Mintus, and Walter Scott Neff.

On August 25, 1941, witness William M. Canning reversed his testimony in favor Professor Schappes, which threw into doubt Canning's previous testimony on Kenneth Ackley, Walter Scott Neff, Arthur Braunlich, Seymour Copstein, Philip S. Foner, and Morris U. Cohen.

=== Resignation ===
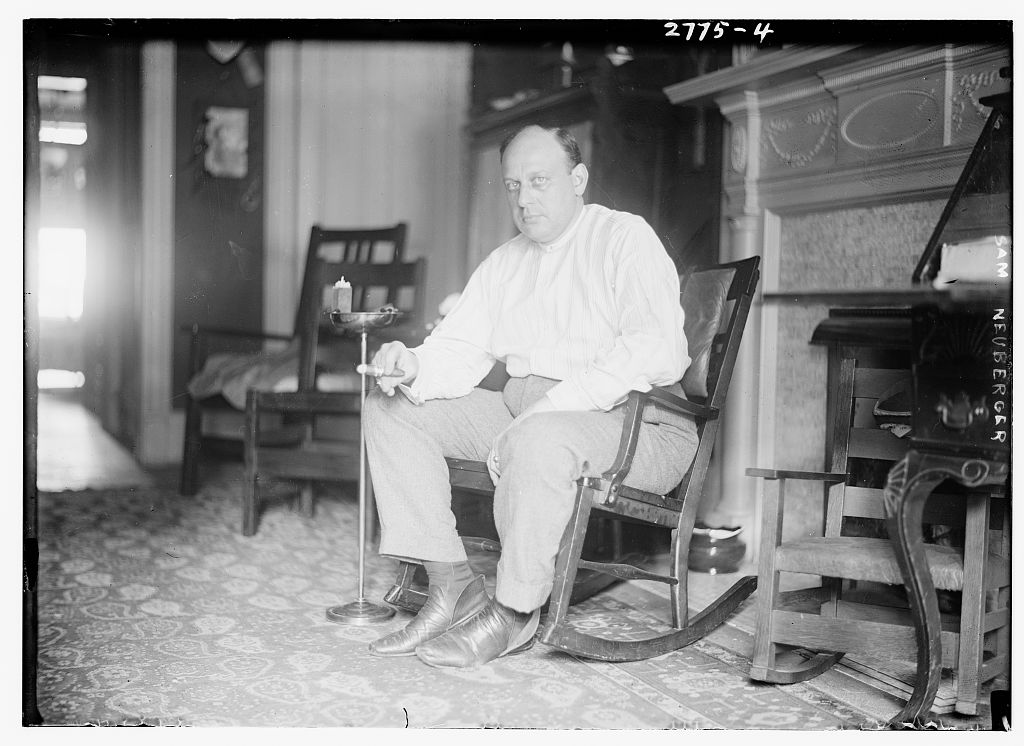
ILD lawyer Samuel A. Neuberger represented Morris U. Cohen in 1941 and 1953

On September 18, 1941, the City College of New York student newspaper The Campus followed up with lives of the three teachers on suspension:

- Sidney Eisenberger (Chemistry) could not afford to support his family and consequently was forced to send his wife and four-year-old twins to live with relatives in Ohio...
- Morris U. Cohen (Chemistry), responsible for the recent reduction in chem lab fees and... important x-ray work was another who was obliged to give up his home. His family, including his five-year-old son, was able to stay together–but only in the home of relatives.
- Morris U. Schappes... not only lost his job, but after admitting former membership in the Communist Party, he was arrested and put in jail.

On October 6, 1941, Cohen's lawyer, Samuel A. Neuberger, abruptly walked out on his client and left the courtroom when the court would not let him subpoena full records related to Cohen's charges of graft and corruption at the City College of New York.

On January 19, 1942, Cohen, Louis Balamuth, and Arnold Shikatoff resigned from their teaching positions at the City College of New York, while the Board of Higher Education dismissed three clerks: Jesse Mintus, Morris Foner, and Jetta Alpert.

Cohen worked at the Technical Research Laboratories after leaving the City College of New York, which had contracts with the US Army. He was also a stockholder in Balco Corp. with Lewis Balamuth and Joseph Steigman. He also worked for the Gussack Machine Products Company of Long Island City "under contract for Armed Forces."

=== 1953 SISS ===
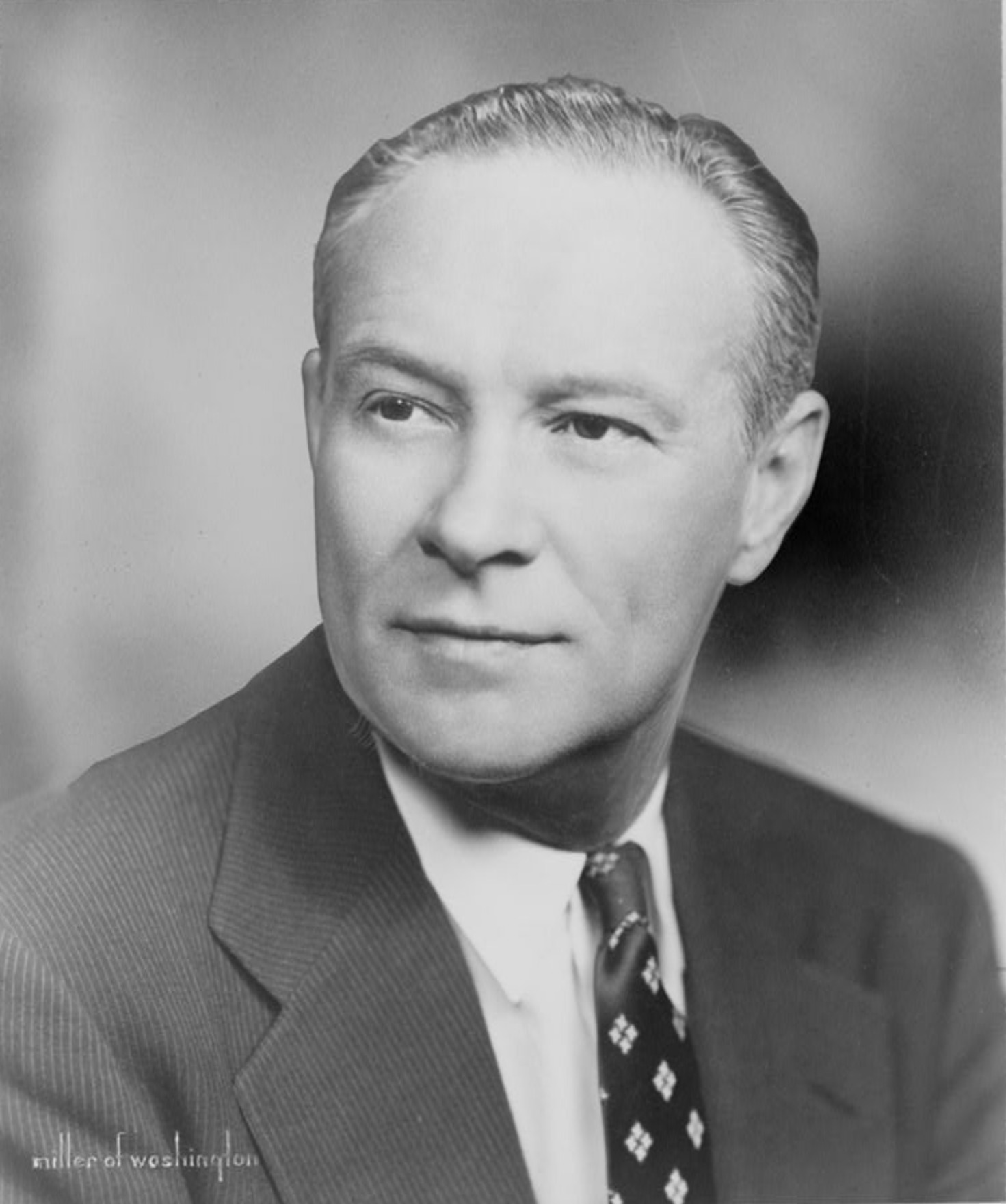
US Senator William E. Jenner chaired the Senate Internal Security Subcommittee when it subpoenaed Morris U. Cohen.

On May 19, 1953, Morris U. Cohen appeared before the US Senate Internal Security Subcommittee (SISS). Accompanying was attorney Samuel A. Neuberger (who had represented Cohen during the Rapp-Coudert Committee hearings in the early 1940s). Lewis Balamuth and Martin Canning testified earlier the same day that Cohen had been a member of the Communist Party. The committee acknowledged Cohen's request to keep his address from the public: "that request was denied."

On May 20, 1953, Morris U. Cohen's photo appeared on the front page of the Brooklyn Eagle newspaper under the headline "Red Prober Flays Ex-CCNY Teacher." Under his photo, the caption read "Mum About Espionage." The article calls him a chemist residing at 2028 Mermaid Avenue, Brooklyn, and repeats Senator Eastland's branding as "one of the worst men as a security risk" ever to appear before Senate Internal Security Subcommittee. SISS tried to imply guilt by his plea of the Fifth, to which Cohen retorted that the Fifth "was set up to protect innocents, and in all fairness I think you ought to draw that inference."

In a June 22, 1953 article for LIFE magazine, Whittaker Chambers wrote of Cohen's testimony:

The last of them but one to reach the stand is Mr. Morris U. Cohen... They say: "Let me ask you this question: Are you now a spy for the Soviet Union?" Mr.Cohen: "I must certainly decline to answer that."
That "certainly" is too much for one of the senators. He says: "You must certainly decline to answer that question, and the reason is that, if you were, you would be guilty of treason. That is the reason for your putting the emphasis there, that you must 'certainly' decline to answer that question?" Unlike the senator, the rest of us are expressly denied the right, by the whole tradition of American law and justice, to draw any conclusions as to the guilt or innocence of Mr. Morris U. Cohen or any other witness who seeks refuge behind the Fifth Amendment. But one conclusion we are permitted to draw: In the face of such testimony, any government which did not pursue such investigations by every means in its power, including congressional committees, would have abdicated one of the duties for which government exists.

On November 30, 1953, the Associated Press published a story critical of the government by noting that only Alger Hiss and Judith Coplon trials had led to results (of which only the Hiss trial resulted in a conviction that stuck). In the same piece, Cohen's name appeared among a dozen OSS and U.S. military employees. These dozen in "important" posts fit a "pattern of such infiltration by those who have invoked their privilege against incrimination when asked about the subcommittee's evidence of their Communist Party membership." The remaining names were: Leo M. Drozdoff, Irving Fajans, Jack Sargeant Harris, Paul V. Martineau, Leonard E. Mims, Milton Wolff, George S. Wuchinich, Herman Landau, Sidney J. Socolar, Ralph Spitzer, and Joseph Steigman.

== Personal life and death ==
Cohen married and had one son.

Cohen made a "non-alumni" contribution in 1959-1960 to Haverford College, where his son studied

Cohen appears to have died in 1989, when the Anshe Emeth Memorial Temple of New Brunswick, New Jersey, published a memorial mention of his name.

== Legacy ==
When Cohen exposed graft and corruption at the City College of New York, the Daily Worker published not just editorials of support but the following paean on August 16, 1941:

When Cohen raked them fore and aft
With charges of corruption
The profs who made the dough from graft
Had quite a big eruption.
"Take not away our ten percent,"
They piteously said.
And Coudert knew just what they meant:
He canned him as a "red."

== Works ==
- Method of reducing reflection of a transparent body, applied 1942, granted 1947

== See also ==
- Rapp-Coudert Committee
- Morris Schappes
- Jack D. Foner
- Moses Finley
- Samuel A. Neuberger
- Whittaker Chambers

== External sources ==
- Guide to the Records of the Board of Higher Education of the City of New York, 1941-1957, bulk 1941-1942
- CCNY photo of 9 of 11 "Suspended CCNY Teachers" (David Cohen, Samuel Margolies, Walter Scott Neff, Saul Bernstein, John Kenneth Ackley, Morris U. Cohen, Louis Balamuth, Jesse Mintus, and Sidney Eisenberger)
