= Frederic Ewen =

Austrian-American professor

Frederic Ewen (1899 – October 18, 1988) was an English professor at Brooklyn College from 1930 to 1952. During the height of the McCarthy period Ewen was forced to resign his teaching position after refusing to cooperate with a Senate Internal Security Committee investigation of communism and higher education.

== Early years ==
Frederic Ewen was born in Lemberg, Austria in 1899, one of eleven children. He immigrated to the United States with his family in 1912. He graduated from the City College of New York and received his Ph.D. in English and Comparative Literature from Columbia University. His first book, The Prestige of Schiller in England, based on his doctoral dissertation, was published by Columbia University Press.

== Academic career ==
Ewen was appointed assistant professor of English at Brooklyn College in 1930. he joined the Teachers Union shortly thereafter and was involved in left politics on campus and within the larger movement in New York City.

In 1940 the New York State Legislature's Joint Committee to Investigate Procedures and Methods of Allocating State Moneys for Public Purposes and Subversive Activities, known as the Rapp-Coudert Committee, launched an investigation of public schools and city colleges. Along with 6 other professors, Ewen was summoned before the committee and refused to testify. He described the committee's work as "an attack on the things that the [educational] system stands for and has fought in the last 20 years to obtain." The Committee sought to jail some of them, including Ewen, for contempt. In his defense he submitted an affidavit stating "I am not a Communist or a member of the Communist party and I have never engaged in any 'subversive' activities at Brooklyn College or elsewhere." Ewen and his Brooklyn College colleagues were tenured, so they retained their position, while City College professors including Morris Schappes and Moses Finley lost their jobs when their contracts were not renewed.

In 1942, the English department recommended Ewen for promotion to associate professor. College president Harry Gideonse declined to approve it. In 1952, Ewen and three of the other Brooklyn College professors who had been called to testify by the Rapp-Coudert Committee were summoned before the U.S. Senate Internal Security Committee chaired by Pat McCarran. They again refused to testify. Having served 30 years, Ewen was eligible for retirement and announced his decision to retire when he took the witness chair". He later told reporters he did so "for reasons of intellectual honesty". The other three professors lost their jobs.

After being forced to leave Brooklyn College, Ewen assembled a team of blacklisted actors, including Ossie Davis, Ruby Dee, and John Randolph to present dramatic readings of great works of literature. The group performed at union halls, theaters, and other venues.

When the repression of the McCarthy era began to lift in the early 1960s, Ewen, along with Phoebe Brand and John Randolph, produced an adaptation of James Joyce's Portrait of the Artist as a Young Man, which had a two-year run (1962–63) at the Martinique Theatre in New York City. In 1967 Ewen published Bertolt Brecht: His Life, His Art, and His Times. Howard Clurman, reviewing it in The New York Times, said "it conveys the excitement, the turmoil and triumph of Brecht's career." During these years he worked with Brand and Randolph on adaptations of a series of Anton Chekhov's plays for CBS's Camera Three series.

In 1972, he signed a letter protesting the treatment of Leopold Trepper by the Polish government, along with John Hersey and others.

== Later years ==
Ewen remained active until well into his 80s. In 1984 he published The Heroic Imagination: The Creative Genius of Europe from Waterloo (1815) to the Revolution of 1848, in which he took issue with the new literary criticism that focused on a close reading of the text without considering social context as literary critics had when Ewen was coming of age in the academy of the 1930s and 1940s. At the time of his death, Ewen was working on a second volume, which appeared posthumously as A Half-Century of Greatness: The Creative Imagination of Europe 1848–1884. These two volumes explore the relationship between Marxism and Romanticism, the politics of protest and revolution, and the European literary tradition.

Shortly before his death, Brooklyn College formally apologized to him and to the other professors dismissed during the McCarthy era. The college later established a lecture series on civil rights in his name.

Ewen died in New York City of a heart attack on October 18, 1988. That same month Citadel Press published his introduction to a collection of the stories of Maxim Gorky.

He was married to composer Miriam Gideon (1906–1996).

== Additional sources ==
- Marjorie Heins, Priests of Our Democracy: The Supreme Court, Academic Freedom, and the Anti-Communist Purge (New York University Press, 2013)
