= 1937 New York City department store strikes =

Sit-down strike

1937 NYC department store strikes
- Date: 1937
- Location: NYC, New York, United States

During the 1937 New York City department store strikes over 100 department store workers participated in a sit-down strike in New York City. In an interview with a worker from the Federal Writers' Project (an agency of the Works Progress Administration), department store clerk Irving Fajans talked about the sit-in strikers – with demands of a forty-hour work week and higher hourly wages—and their twelve-day occupation of five New York City chain department stores. (The protest was inspired by a successful sit-down strike by Woolworth’s employees in Detroit; in New York, most of the participants were employees of Grand department stores; the Woolworth‘s sit-down was cut short by arrests.)

“Arrangements had been made for food and bedding to be brought in, and the workers notified their families by phone that they would be away from home indefinitely. We had cots brought in and blankets, electric burners for coffee, and plenty of eats. Although there was food and other things we might have used in the store, none of our people touched any sort of merchandise during the strike. Two engagements were announced during the time we sat in, and we held parties. We even held a marriage ceremony there for a couple who decided to get married during the strike. The girls dressed up the bride, and the fellows groomed the groom, and we had a priest sent for, and married them. It was pretty cold, being early spring, and the blankets we had were not enough, so we had to huddle together at nights. Some of the fellows slept on the counters. There were some canary cages in the store, and we kept the birds fed...They'd trill and wake us up early in the morning. We had games like checkers and cards, and we had a radio, and danced to the music. The strike held out over Easter week, and it happened that some of our people were Italians and Irish Catholics; so since they couldn't attend services, we held Easter services for them in the store.”

Although not all demands were met, strikers were partially successful. After nearly two weeks and numerous arrests of supporting picketers, the occupying workers gained higher wages and union recognition. The goal of a forty-hour workweek wasn’t met yet, though a forty-eight-hour work week (eight hours a day, six-days a week) was negotiated.
