= Miriam Gideon =

American composer (1906–1996)

Miriam Gideon (October 23, 1906 – June 18, 1996) was an American composer who wrote at least 130 pieces of music.

== Life ==
Miriam Gideon was born in Greeley, Colorado, on October 23, 1906. She studied organ with her uncle Henry Gideon and piano with Felix Fox. She also studied with Martin Bernstein, Marion Bauer, Charles Haubiel, and Jacques Pillois. She studied harmony, counterpoint, and composition with Lazare Saminsky and at his suggestion also composition with Roger Sessions, after which she abandoned tonality and wrote in a freely atonal or extended post-tonal style. She attended Boston University and graduated with a degree in music in 1926.

Gideon moved to New York City, where she taught at Brooklyn College, City University of New York (CUNY) from 1944 to 1954 and City College, CUNY from 1947 to 1955. She then taught at the Jewish Theological Seminary of America at the invitation of Hugo Weisgall in 1955, and at the Manhattan School of Music from 1967 to 1991. She was rehired by City College in 1971 as full professor and retired in 1976.

In 1949, Gideon married Brooklyn College assistant professor Frederic Ewen. Both were political leftists. Ewen, who refused to testify before the Rapp-Coudert Committee in 1940, was summoned to testify before the Senate Internal Security Committee chaired by Democratic Senator Pat McCarran in 1952. He retired to avoid testifying. Miriam Gideon was investigated by the FBI, and in 1954 and 1955 she resigned from her music teaching posts at City College and Brooklyn College.

Gideon composed a lot of vocal music, setting texts by Francis Thompson, Christian Morgenstern, Anne Bradstreet, Norman Rosten, Serafin, Joaquín Quintero and others. Selected compositions include Lyric Piece for Strings (1942), Mixco (1957), Adon Olom, Fortunato, Sabbath Morning Service, Friday Evening Service, and Of Shadows Numberless (1966).

She was the second woman inducted into American Academy and Institute of Arts and Letters in 1975, following Louise Talma who was inducted in 1974.

She died in New York City.

Gideon's 1958 opera Fortunato, edited by Stephanie Jensen-Moulton, was published as part of the Recent Researches in American Music series by A-R Editions in 2013. Jensen-Moulton has published extensively on Gideon, including a number of essays available online, including "Setting an 'Unused Poem': Miriam Gideon’s 'Böhmischer Krystall' " for the American Composers Alliance.

== The Miriam Gideon Prize ==
The International Alliance for Women in Music (IAWM) offers the Miriam Gideon Prize annually, sponsored by composer Patsy Rogers, for female undergraduate and graduate students who are members of IAWM. Applicants must be 50 years of age or over, and submit an original unpublished musical score for voice and piano or voice and small chamber ensemble.

== Selected works ==
Works by Gideon:

- 1 ADON OLOM (1957) - SATB, ob, tpt in C, strings: vl1, vl2, vla, vc, cb
- 2 ADON OLOM (1958) satb, piano/organ
- 3 AIR FOR VIOLIN & PIANO (1950)
- 4 AYELET HASHAKHAR (Morning Star) SONGS OF CHILDHOOD ON HEBREW TEXTS (1990)
  - med voice, pf
- 5 BELLS (1966) for low or medium voice and piano
- 6 BÖHMISCHER KRYSTALL (1988) - Sop, fl, cl, vln, vcl, pf or Sop, pf
- 7 DIVERTIMENTO for Wind Quartet (1957) - fl, ob, cl, bsn
- 8 ECLOGUE (1990) - fl, pf
- 9 EPITAPHS FROM ROBERT BURNS (1952) for high, low voice versions with piano
- 10 FANTASY ON IRISH FOLK-MOTIVES (1975)
  - for ob, bsn (or cello), vla, perc (1) (vib, glock, tam-tam (medium))
- 11 FAREWELL TABLET TO AGATHOCLES (from 'Songs of Voyage') (1961)
  - for Med voice, pf
- 12 FORTUNATO (A Chamber Opera in 3 Scenes) (1958)
  - piano, vocal soloists
- 13 GERMAN SONGS (1937) for high or low voice, piano
- 14 HABITABLE EARTH, THE (Cantata) (1966)
  - satb soli, mixed chor, ob, pf or org
- 15 HOMMAGE A MA JEUNESSE (To My Youth) Sonatina for Two Pianos (1935)
- 15 bis THE HOUND OF HEAVEN (1945) for voice and instrumental chamber ensemble
- 16 LITTLE IVORY FIGURES PULLED WITH STRING (1950)
  - medium voice (some spoken, non-pitched, some sung) and guitar
- 17 LOCKUNG (1937) for high voice, piano
- 18 LYRIC PIECE (1941) for string orchestra
- 19 LYRIC PIECE (1955) for string quartet
- 20 MAY THE WORDS OF MY MOUTH (1957) SATB
- 21 MIXCO (1957)
  - voice and piano (high, med, and low versions available)
- 22 OF SHADOWS NUMBERLESS (Suite) (1966) for piano
- 23 POET TO POET (Song Cycle for High Voice and Piano) (1987)
- 24 QUARTET, for Strings (1946
- 25 RONDO APPASSIONATO (1990) for piano, perc, cell
- 26 SHE WEEPS OVER RAHOON (1940) for high voice and piano
- 27 SIX CUCKOOS IN QUEST OF A COMPOSER (1957) for piano
- 28 SLOW, SLOW FRESH FOUNT - TTBB
- 29 SLOW, SLOW FRESH FOUNT - SATB
- 30 SONATA FOR CELLO AND PIANO (1991)
- 31 SONATA FOR PIANO (1983)
- 32 SONATA FOR VIOLA & PIANO (1957)
- 33 SONGS OF VOYAGE (1964) for high voice or low voice, piano
- 34 SONNETS FROM FATAL INTERVIEW (1961) for mezzo soprano and piano
- 35 SONNETS FROM FATAL INTERVIEW (1961) for mezzo soprano, vln, vla, vcl
- 36 SONNETS FROM SHAKESPEARE (1986) for medium low voice, piano
- 37 SONNETS FROM SHAKESPEARE (1986)
  - for high or low voice, trumpet (Bb), string quartet OR string orchestra
- 38 STEEDS OF DARKNESS (1990) for high voice, fl, ob, perc, vc, pf
- 39 SUITE FOR CLARINET AND PIANO (1972) - cl in A (or bassoon) and piano
- 40 SWEET WESTERN WIND (1956) - SATB
- 41 SYMPHONIA BREVIS (1953) 2-2-2-2,4-2-2-0, timp, strings
- 42 TANGO LANGOROSO for piano
- 43 THREE BIBLICAL MASKS (1958) - organ solo
- 44 THREE BIBLICAL MASKS (for Purim) (1979) for vln, pf
- 45 THREE CORNERED PIECES (1935) pf (for young musicians)
- 46 TO MUSIC (1990) for high, medium, or low voice, with piano
- 47 THE TOO-LATE BORN (1939) for high voice, piano
- 48 TRIO (1978) for clarinet in A, vcl, pf
- 49 VERGIFTET SIND MEINE LIEDER (1937) for high voice, piano
- 50 VOICES FROM ELYSIUM (1984) for high voice, fl, clar, vln, vcl, pf
- 51 WHERE WILD CARNATIONS BLOW (A Song to David)
  - Soli, mixed choir, ch orch 1-1-0-0-, 0-2-0-0-, timp, strings
- 52 A WOMAN OF VALOR (EISHET CHAYIL) (1982)
  - for medium voice, piano
