= Samuel A. Neuberger =

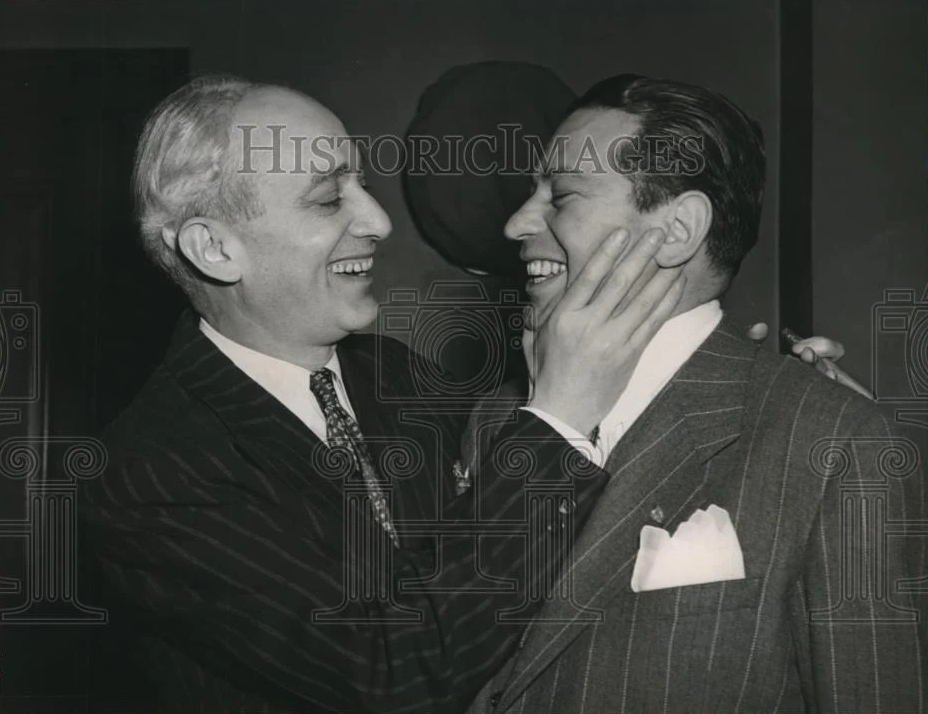
Neuberger (right) is embraced by his client Leon Josephson after they were granted a two-hour postponement in court, March 18, 1948

Samuel Neuberger was an American attorney for International Labor Defense.

== Career ==
In 1941, Neuberger represented City College of New York chemistry professor Morris U. Cohen before the Rapp-Coudert Committee.

In 1953, Neuberger represented Cohen again, this time, before the US Senate Internal Security Subcommittee (SISS).

== External sources ==
- Tamiment Library - Oral Histories - Samuel Neuberger
