= Women of Hope: African Americans Who Made a Difference =

1998 book by Joyce Hansen

Women of Hope: African Americans Who Made A Difference
- Author: Joyce Hansen
- Language: English
- Publisher: Scholastic
- Publication date: November 1, 1998
- Pages: 32
- ISBN: 978-0-590-93973-7

Women of Hope: African Americans Who Made A Difference is a 1998 non-fiction children's book by American author Joyce Hansen, published by Scholastic.

== Description ==
The book features one-page profiles of 13 African American women written by Hansen, alongside black-and-white photographic portraits of each woman. The portraits were part of a poster series created by Bread and Roses, a cultural project of 1199 National Health and Human Services Employees Union. Bread and Roses executive director Moe Foner wrote the foreword to the book.

The women profiled are:

- Maya Angelou, writer
- Alexa Canady, neurosurgeon
- Septima Poinsette Clark, educator
- Ella J. Baker, activist
- Ruby Dee, actress
- The Delany sisters (Sarah Louise Delany and Annie Elizabeth Delany), civil rights pioneers
- Marian Wright Edelman, activist
- Mae Jemison, astronaut
- Fannie Lou Hamer, activist
- Toni Morrison, writer
- Alice Walker, writer
- Ida B. Wells, journalist

== Reception ==
Publishers Weekly wrote that the book's chronological organization "creates a sense of the expanding horizon of opportunities that African-American women have gained as the century has progressed," adding that the "handsome volume will likely engender in readers an appreciation for life's countless possibilities, and send them scrambling to find out more about these extraordinary women." In a review for Book Page, Lisa Horak wrote that the book's "brief profiles are perfect for a book report or for young readers with short attention spans". Kirkus Reviews wrote that the book is "inspirational, but it’s also effective as art and as history."
