= Lawrence Bush =

American writer

Lawrence Bush (born 1951) is the author of several books of Jewish fiction and non-fiction, including Waiting for God: The Spiritual Explorations of a Reluctant Atheist and Bessie: A Novel of Love and Revolution.

He was born in New York City, attended Springfield Gardens High School, and holds a B.A. from City College of New York. In addition to writing and editing, he has worked as a puppeteer and school music teacher.

== Jewish Currents ==
From 2002 to 2018 Bush edited Jewish Currents, an independent, progressive magazine founded in 1946 that during his tenure promoted Jewish identity as "a counterculture. . . in many ways antithetical to what drives our country today".

"Throughout the conservative onslaught of the past three decades," Bush has editorialized in Jewish Currents, "we have argued repeatedly that Jewish identification with the have-nots is more consistent with our people's history, tradition, self-interest, and prospects for continuity, than the currying of favor with the powers-that-be — especially when those powers resemble nothing more than Pharaoh, the imperial oppressor of Biblical Egypt."

He is also the editor of the daily blog JEWDAYO, discussing events from Jewish life and history on the anniversary of their occurrence. In 2011, the entries from the first year of the blog, 2010, were collected into a printed daybook Jewdayo.

== Other writings ==
Bush is the former editor of Reconstructionism Today, the quarterly magazine of the Jewish Reconstructionist movement. He was co-editor of Jews., an arts magazine and mail-art experience publIshed from 1999–2004. His writings have appeared in the New York Times, Tikkun, Moment, Reform Judaism and Mad magazine, among others. He provided updating and commentary for the millennial edition of Leo Rosten's classic, The Joys of Yiddish.

Bush served for more than a decade as speechwriter for Rabbi Alexander Schindler, the late leader of Reform Judaism in America. Bush has described himself as "an atheist who has nevertheless worked intimately in Jewish religious institutions as a writer and editor for much of my adult life."

"There is a progressive pulse at the core of Jewish thought," Bush has written. "It is this pulse — humanistic, engaged with the world, responsive to cultural evolution, dissatisfied with the status quo — that most keeps me engaged with Jewish identity and committed to its nurture. Notwithstanding contrary interpretations or even widespread indifference to the philosophical riches of Judaism, I'm drawn to the view of I.L. Peretz, who wrote that Jews who 'wish to be true to ourselves' should be asking 'vital questions' about 'conscience, freedom, culture, ethics.'

In 2011, together with cartoonist Richard Codor, Bush created the humorous Babushkin's Catalogue of Jewish Inventions

== Books by Lawrence Bush ==
- Bush, Lawrence (2008). Waiting for God: The Spiritual Explorations of a Reluctant Atheist. Ben Yehuda Press. ISBN 978-0-9789980-5-9.
- American Torah Toons: 54 Illustrated Commentaries (1997)
- Jews, Money and Social Responsibility: Creating "Torah of Money" for Everyday Life (1993)
- Emma Ansky-Levine and Her Mitzvah Machine (1991)
- Bush, Lawrence (1988). Bessie: A Novel of Love and Revolution. Ben Yehuda Press. ISBN 0-9789980-3-0.
- Rooftop Secrets and other stories of anti-Semitism (1986), a collection of short stories intended for a juvenile audience.
