= Morris Schappes =

American writer, editor and activist

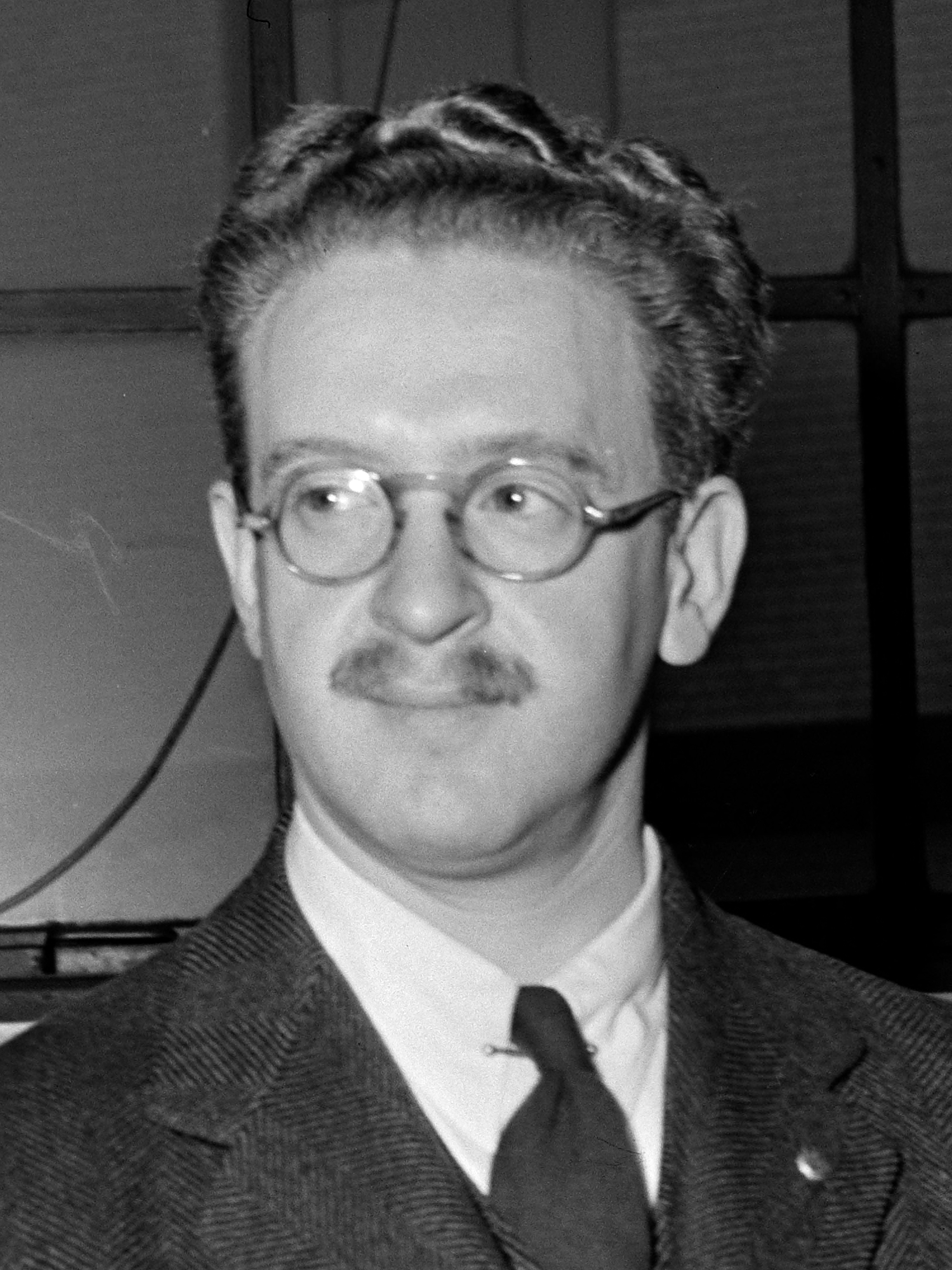
- Schappes in 1941
- Born: Moise ben Haim Shapshilevich; May 3, 1907; Kamenets-Podolsk, Ukraine
- Died: June 3, 2004 (aged 97); New York City
- Other names: Maurice U. Schappes, Morris Urman Schappes
- Citizenship: American
- Years active: 1928-2000
- Employer: Jewish Currents magazine
- Known for: 1941 perjury conviction vis-a-vis Rapp-Coudert Committee

Morris U. Schappes (pronounced SHAP-pess, born Moishe Shapshilevich; May 3, 1907 – June 3, 2004) was an American educator, writer, radical political activist, historian, and magazine editor, best remembered for a 1941 perjury conviction obtained in association with testimony before the Rapp-Coudert Committee (investigating Communism in education in New York) and as long-time editor of the radical magazine Jewish Currents.

== Background ==
Morris U. Schappes was born Moishe ben Haim Shapshilevich in Kamianets-Podilskyi, Ukraine, then part of the Russian Empire. The Shapshilevich family left Tsarist Russia when Morris was a small child, living first in Brazil before emigrating to the United States in 1914. The family name was truncated to "Schappes" by Brazilian immigration authorities and Moishe's mother later Americanized his name to "Morris" upon the family's arrival in North America. His middle initial, "U," referred to nothing, but was inserted by Schappes as a collegiate journalist to add zest to his byline. He earned a Bachelor of Arts degree from City College of New York and a Master's degree from Columbia University.

== Career ==
In the latter 1920s, Schappes taught at the New York Workers School.

In 1928, he accepted a position as a lecturer in the English Department of City College. He was "highly regarded' as an effective teacher and was awarded annual pay raises seven times during his career at City College. He was regarded as a scholar by his peers and frequently contributed reviews and commentary to the popular and academic press, including such magazines as Saturday Review, the New York Post, The Nation, Poetry, and American Literature.

=== Communism ===
In 1934, Schappes joined the Communist Party, USA.

On April 23, 1936, a new head of the English Department at City College wrote to Schappes announcing that his position at City College was to be regarded as temporary, and that he was therefore summarily dismissed from the staff. Students at City College erupted at what they perceived to be a politically motivated personnel decision, with 1500 students signing a petition calling for Schappes' reinstatement and protest meetings held by the American Student Union and former students of Schappes.

=== Investigations ===
==== Rapp-Coudert ====
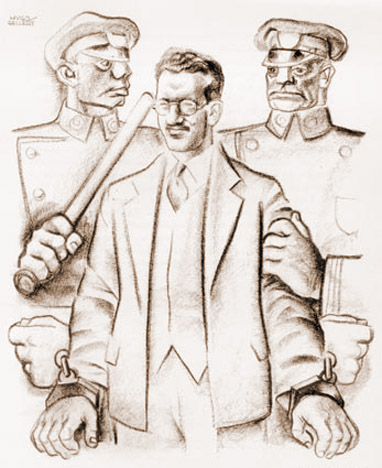
"The Arrest of Morris Schappes" by Hugo Gellert, depicting Schappes' arrest amidst Rapp-Coudert Committee hearings (1941)

In 1941, Schappes was one of 40 educators fired in conjunction with an investigation by the Joint Legislative Committee to Investigate the Educational System of the State of New York, commonly known as the Rapp-Coudert Committee, a body which attempted to identify and remove members of the Communist Party USA from the public education system of New York state.

In sworn testimony given to the Committee, Schappes stated that he only knew three members of the Communist Party at City College — two of whom were dead and one who was a well-known party organizer.

After another City College Communist had "named names," implicating fifty employees of City College as party members, Schappes was indicted for having committed perjury in his testimony.

Schappes served nearly 14 months in state prison, where he learned Hebrew, attended Sabbath, and studied Jewish history. Upon release, he worked in a war production factory in Long Island City.

==== Senate Subcommittee on Internal Security ====
In 1952, Professor Lewis Balamuth testified before the Senate Subcommittee on Internal Security as follows:

Mr. Morris: Would you tell us the circumstances of your joining the Communist Party?
Mr. Balamuth: Well, I was recruited into the Communist Party by Morris Schappes ... There as a club called the Penn and Hammer club that met somewhere in the Chelsea area ... They discussed literature and science from the point of view of Marxism ... I attended two or three of the meetings of this group and ... shortly thereafter Mr. Schappes invited me to join the Communist Party ... I did join the Communist Party."

==== McCarthy ====
In 1953, as part of fallout from a purge of books in USIA overseas libraries, The Senate Permanent Subcommittee on Investigations, chaired by Senator Joseph McCarthy, subpoenaed Schappes to appear before it in April 1953 to defend his own books.

==== Exoneration ====
In 1981, City University apologized to Schappes and still-living professors for firing them four decades earlier.

=== Jewish Life ===
In November 1946, he became a member of the editorial board of Jewish Life (later known as Jewish Currents), an English-language magazine associated with the Communist Party USA dealing with Jewish issues and targeted to a Jewish readership. He served as editor of this publication for the next four decades, ending in 2000. He wrote "The Editor's Diary."

In the aftermath of Nikita Khrushchev's February 1956 "Secret Speech" and the violent repression of the Hungarian Revolution of 1956 in the fall of that year, Jewish Currents aligned with a dissident liberal faction of the CPUSA headed by John Gates. The magazine ultimately decided to leave the Communist Party orbit altogether to pursue an independent existence.

=== Academia ===
In 1948, Schappes began teaching at the Jefferson School of Social Science through 1957.

In 1957, Schappes began teaching at the School of Jewish Knowledge through 1969.

In 1972, he accepted a position as adjunct professor of history at Queens College.

He was an active member of the American Jewish Historical Society and the American Historical Association.

Schappes garnered professional recognition for his work as a historian; in 1993 he received the Torchbearer Award of the American Jewish Historical Society.

== Personal life, death, legacy ==
In 1930, Schappes married Sonya Laffer, who died in 1992.

In 1942, Henry Foner composed "The Ballad of Morris Schappes."

Regarding the Communist Party, the New York Times noted at his death:

It is not clear when Mr. Schappes broke with the Communist Party, but at least one account, J. Edgar Hoover's book Masters of Deceit, suggests that Mr. Schappes was still active as late as 1957. By 1958, Ms. Jochnowitz said, the Jewish Life staff had become anguished by the Soviet Union's abrupt discarding of Stalin and the only sort of Communism they had known. They started Jewish Currents that year as a voice independent of Moscow, both in content and financing.

Morris Schappes died age 97 on June 3, 2004, in New York City.

Schappes' papers reside in two collections, one held by the Tamiment Library of New York University in New York City and the other by the American Jewish Historical Society. In 1983, Schappes submitted an oral history of his life to Columbia University in New York City, material which was transcribed into 66 pages.

== Works ==
- Letters from the Tombs. Foreword by Richard Wright. New York: Schappes Defense Committee, 1941.
- The Daily Worker: Heir to the Great Tradition. New York: Daily Worker, 1944.
- Resistance is the Lesson: The Meaning of the Warsaw Ghetto Uprising. New York: Jewish Life, n.d. (1948).
- Anti-Semitism and Reaction, 1795-1800. Philadelphia: Publications of the Jewish Historical Society, n.d. (1948).
- Problems of Jewish Culture. New York: School of Jewish Studies, 1950.
- A Documentary History of the Jews in the United States, 1654-1875. New York: Citadel Press, 1950.
- The Jews in the United States: A Pictorial History, 1654 to the Present. New York: Citadel Press, 1958.
- Shylock and Anti-Semitism. New York: Jewish Currents, 1962.
- The Strange World of Hannah Arendt. New York: Jewish Currents, 1963.
- Jewish Currents Reader: A Selection of Short Stories, Poems and Essays from Jewish Currents Years 1956-1966. Editor. New York: Jewish Currents, 1966.
- Jewish Identity: Dialogue with Jewish Youth. With Michael H. Agronoff and Judith Kerman. New York: Jewish Currents, 1967.
- The Jewish Question and the Left — Old and New: A Challenge to the New Left. New York: Jewish Currents, 1970.
- Irving Howe's 'The World of Our Fathers': A Critical Analysis. New York: Jewish Currents, 1977.

== See also ==
- Morris U. Cohen
- Jack D. Foner
- Moses Finley
- Rapp-Coudert Committee

== External sources ==
- CUNY: Struggle for Free Speech at CCNY, 1931-42: Imprisoning Schappes
- Morris Schappes Papers at Tamiment Library and Robert F. Wagner Labor Archives at New York University
