= I Thought My Soul Would Rise and Fly =

Children's book

I Thought My Soul Would Rise and Fly: The Diary of Patsy, a Freed Girl
- Author: Joyce Hansen
- Language: English
- Series: Dear America
- Genre: Historical fiction
- Publisher: Scholastic
- Publication date: October 1, 1997
- Pages: 202
- ISBN: 9780590849135

I Thought My Soul Would Rise and Fly: The Diary of Patsy, a Freed Girl is a 1997 historical fiction children's book by American author Joyce Hansen, published by Scholastic. The book is part of the Dear America series for young readers. It was named a Coretta Scott King Honor Book in 1998.

== Summary ==
The novel is set in Mars Bluff, South Carolina 1865, during the Reconstruction era, immediately after the end of the American Civil War. 12-year-old Patsy is a now-former slave living on the Davis plantation, who records the changes she is experiencing in a diary, given to her by Annie and Charles, her former enslaver's niece and nephew. Her ability to read and write, a secret she has so far kept from others, allows her to forge a better life for herself and her community. Patsy discusses her feeling that she has no one she can call family and no place to call home, though she has lived on the plantation for her entire life; she lacks a last name for herself. Characters in the novel include Patsy, Susan (the cook), Ruth, Nancy, Mariam, Master Davis, and Missus Davis.

== Release ==
I Thought My Soul Would Rise and Fly was first published in 1997 as part of Scholastic's Dear America historical fiction series. The book was reissued in 2011 with new cover art. An audiobook version was released in 2005 by Live Oak Media.

== Reception ==
The Reading Teacher called the book a "well written, engaging addition to the Dear America series." Writing in the Western Journal of Black Studies, Nancy J. Dawson praised the fact that "it by no means sugarcoats the ugly-harsh realities of slavery," and concluded that it is "a significant and eloquent work of juvenile fiction."

In a chapter on children's literature in The Cambridge Companion to African American Women's Literature, Dianne Johnson wrote that the book is "one of [Hansen's] most beautiful and, as always, meticulously researched books". School Library Journal called the audiobook version "well done" with "enough suspense to hold the attention of preteens while providing an enriching experience for students studying the Reconstruction period."

In 1998, I Thought My Soul Would Rise and Fly was named a Coretta Scott King Honor Book by the American Library Association.
