= Steven J. Gold =

Steven James Gold (born 1955) is a sociologist involved in research on ethnic economies, international migration, the development of ethnic communities, visual sociology, and qualitative methods. Having served as President of the International Visual Sociology Association (1987–1990) and Chair of the American Sociological Association Section on International Migration (2003–2004), he is a professor at Michigan State University in the Department of Sociology

== Early life ==
Gold grew up in Cleveland, Ohio. He attended Brandeis University and University of California, Santa Cruz as an undergraduate, graduating with a BA in both sociology and psychology. He received his master's and doctoral degrees in sociology at University of California, Berkeley. He worked as a sociology professor at Whittier College 1985-1994 and Michigan State University 1994–present.

== Books ==
- Refugee Communities: A Comparative Field Study (Sage 1992).
- From The Workers’ State to The Golden State (Allyn and Bacon 1995).
- Immigration Research for a New Century: Multidisciplinary Perspectives (Co-edited with Rubén G. Rumbaut and Nancy Foner, Russell Sage Foundation, 2000).
- Ethnic Economies (with Ivan Light Academic Press, 2000).
- The Israeli Diaspora (Routledge/University of Washington Press 2002).
- The Store in the Hood: A Century of Ethnic Business and Conflict (Rowman and Littlefield 2010).
- International Handbook of Migration Studies (Co-edited with Stephanie Nawyn, Routledge 2013).

== Awards ==
- Charles Horton Cooley Award for Distinguished Scholarship in Sociology, Michigan Sociology Association, East Lansing, October 2007
- The Israeli Diaspora wins the Thomas and Znaniecki Award from the ASA's International Migration Section for the best book on international migration, August 2003
