= Louis Harap =

American writer and editor

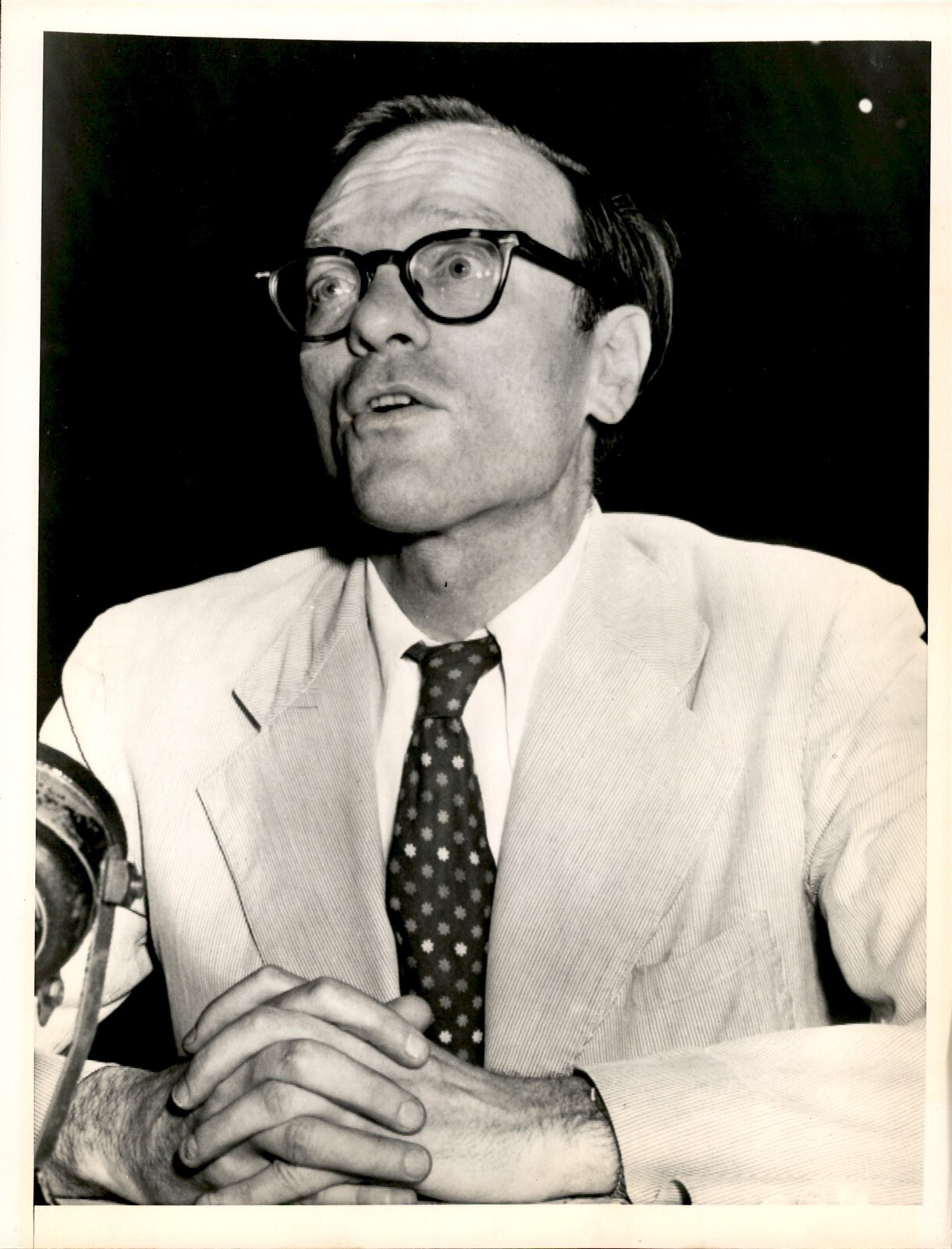
Harap in 1953

Louis Harap (September 16, 1904 – May 12, 1998) was an American writer and editor.

== Biography ==
Harap attended Harvard University, where he was a friend of Delmore Schwartz. He received his doctorate from Harvard in 1932 and then worked as the librarian at Harvard's Library of Philosophy and Psychology until 1939. Harap was active in left-wing politics, organizing a group of Communist faculty members at Harvard with William T. Parry in 1937.

He was a contributor to Science and Society and the Daily Worker. Harap became the managing editor of the left-wing monthly The Jewish Survey in 1941. He later became managing editor of Jewish Life from 1948 to 1957. Harap was one of the first members of the National Committee to Secure Justice in the Rosenberg Case in 1952. In 1953, Harap testified before the House Un-American Activities Committee, denouncing HUAC as anti-Semitic and arguing that Jews were treated better in the Soviet Union than in the United States. Harap died in 1998, in Rutland, Vermont.

== Bibliography ==
- Social Roots of the Arts (New York: International Publishers Company, 1949)
- The Image of the Jew in American Literature: From Early Republic to Mass Immigration (Philadelphia: Jewish Publication Society of America, 1974)
- Dramatic Encounters: The Jewish Presence in Twentieth-Century American Drama, Poetry, and Humor and the Black-Jewish Literary Relationship (New York: Greenwood Press, 1987)
