= Arielle Angel =

American writer and magazine editor

Arielle Angel is an American writer and magazine editor. She serves as editor-at-large of Jewish Currents.

== Early life ==
Angel grew up in Miami. Her father's family survived the Holocaust, specifically the Auschwitz concentration camp, and her mother's side of the family were Arab Jews who came from Haifa. Her mother was a judge and reproductive rights advocate, and her father was an entrepreneur. She attended a Jewish day school and a public high school, where she edited the school newspaper. While in high school she traveled to former concentration camps in Poland as part of a March of the Living trip. After high school, she moved to New York where she attended art school at New York University. During the 2014 Gaza War Angel saw photos of Israelis sitting and watching bombs hit Gaza, and the images made her reconsider her convictions about Israel.

== Career ==
Angel's early work as a writer was on an unpublished manuscript about a drug dealer.

In 2018, Angel joined Jewish Currents as literary editor. She went on to become its editor-in-chief. In June 2026, Angel resigned from her leadership position at Jewish Currents, but she intends to continue producing material for it.

Angel is an organizer with IfNotNow. In 2024, on a Canadian Broadcasting Corporation podcast, she spoke about her experiences visiting university campuses during the Gaza war protests. By 2024, Angel described herself as anti-Zionist, with the recognition that it took a long time for her to make this change.

Angel stepped down as editor-in-chief of Jewish Currents and became its editor-at-large after the magazine's Spring 2026 issue.
