= Joyce Hansen =

American writer (b. 1942)

- Born: October 18, 1942 (age 82); The Bronx, New York City, U.S.
- Occupation: Writer, the schoolteacher
- Notable awards: Coretta Scott King Award honors (x4)

Joyce Viola Hansen (born October 18, 1942) is an American writer and retired schoolteacher. She has earned recognition for her books for children and youth, particularly her historical fiction and non-fiction works about African-American history.

== Life ==
Hansen was born in the Bronx, New York City on October 18, 1942. Her parents were Austin Victor, a photographer, and Lilian Dancy Hansen. She earned a bachelor's degree in English from Pace University (1972) and a master's degree in English from New York University (1978). For 22 years, she worked as a teacher in New York City public schools, before retiring in 1995. Her time as a teacher heavily impacted her writing career. She recognized both disinterest and lack of comprehensive reading skills in her students, so she set out on introducing topics via more entertaining means. For example, while she was teaching her students about the Civil War, she noticed her students struggling to grasp the main concepts. To help her students learn about these topics, she started to publish her young adult books about slavery and the War. She used her personal experience to bolster her writings and offer an authentic point of view for her students. After retirement she lived with her husband in South Carolina and wrote. In 2019, Hansen attended a Fall Literary Festival at the University of South Carolina.

== Fiction ==
Hansen has said that her writing is motivated by a drive to increase interest in reading among her students and others who are underrepresented in children's literature. Her first novel was The Gift-Giver (1980), about a group of friends living in the Bronx. She wrote two sequels to the book, Yellow Bird and Me (1986) and One True Friend (2001).

In addition to novels set in contemporary urban settings, Hansen has written several works of historical fiction about African-American history, including books about slavery and the Civil War. Which Way Freedom? (1986), her first work of historical fiction, was named a Coretta Scott King Honor Book. The book, about a Black teenager serving with the Union Army in the Civil War, was the first of a trilogy of books that included Out From This Place (1998) and The Heart Calls Home (1999).

Her novels The Captive (1994) and I Thought My Soul Would Rise and Fly: The Diary of Patsy, a Freed Girl (part of the Dear America series of books) were also named Coretta Scott King Honor Books.

== Non-fiction ==
Hansen has also written several non-fiction books for youth about African-American and African history. Women of Hope: African Americans Who Made A Difference (1998) features short biographies of thirteen influential Black women, including neurosurgeon Alexa Canady, astronaut Mae Jemison, and activist Fannie Lou Hamer. Kirkus Reviews called the book "inspirational" and "effective as art and as history".

With Gary McGowan, Hansen wrote Breaking Ground, Breaking Silence: The Story of New York's African Burial Ground (1998). The book, which was named a Coretta Scott King Honor Book, detailed the 1991 discovery and excavation of a burial ground for slaves and free blacks in New York City. Also with McGowan, Hansen wrote Freedom Roads (2003), a non-fiction account of the Underground Railroad, which Kirkus called "well-written, well-documented, imaginatively arranged".

Hansen's 2004 book, African Princess: The Amazing Lives of Africa's Royal Women, profiles six prominent women, including Hatshepsut, Amina, and Elizabeth of Toro. A New York Times review called the book "[m]eticulously researched" and "rich with detail, drama and intrigue".

== Selected works ==
=== Fiction ===
- The Gift-Giver (1980) ISBN 9780899198521
- Home Boy (1982) ISBN 9781413491449
- Yellow Bird and Me (1986) ISBN 9780618611164
- Which Way Freedom? (1986) ISBN 9780802735515
- Out From this Place (1988) ISBN 0802768164
- The Captive (1994) ISBN 9780590416245
- I Thought My Soul Would Rise and Fly: The Diary of Patsy, a Freed Girl (Dear America series, 1997, 2011) ISBN 9780545280907
- The Heart Calls Home (1999) ISBN 0802786367
- One True Friend (2001) ISBN 9780618609918
- Home is with Our Family (2010) ISBN 9780786852178

=== Non-fiction ===
- Between Two Fires: Black Soldiers in the Civil War (1993) ISBN 9780531111512
- Breaking Ground, Breaking Silence: The Story of New York's African Burial Ground (with Gary McGowan, 1998) ISBN 9780805050127
- Women of Hope: African Americans Who Made A Difference (1998) ISBN 9780590939737
- Freedom Roads: Searching for the Underground Railroad (with Gary McGowan, 2003) ISBN 9780812626735
- African Princess: The Amazing Lives of Africa's Royal Women (illustrated by Laurie McGaw, 2004) ISBN 9780786851164
