= Henry Foner (chemist) =

Israeli chemist and author

Henry Foner (Hebrew: הנרי פונר; born 1932) is an Israeli chemist and author of a book about the Kindertransport that saved his life as a child just prior to World War II as the Nazis added territory in Europe.

== Background ==
Foner was born "Heinz Lichtwitz" (nickname "Heini") in 1932 in Germany. In 1937, his mother died, so his grandparents helped raise him. His grandfather was Ernst Lichtwitz, owner of a printing press. Henry lived with his father, Max Lichtwitz and his mother, Ilse Lichtwitz née Badt in Berlin. A few months after Kristallnacht, he was sent to the United Kingdom and arrived on February 3, 1939, in Swansea, Wales, to live with Morris and Winifred Foner, to whom he referred as his uncle and aunt. His father was sent to Auschwitz concentration camp on December 9, 1942, and died a week later.

== Career ==
Foner served in the British Army in Egypt and in Sudan from 1953 to 1955. He obtained a doctorate in chemistry from University of Leeds.

== Personal ==
Foner and his wife Judith married in 1960. They have three children and eight grandchildren.

In 1968, Foner and his wife moved to Jerusalem, Israel. Although the UK saved his life, he considered Israel his homeland.

In 2016, regarding the death of Ernst Tremmel, a guard at Auschwitz, he commented:

There can never be a full sense of closure. For me, it does not make sense - you can not recover what was stolen.

== Works ==
- Foner's book Postcards to a Little Boy chronicles his experience as a Kindertransport child.
- Postcards to a Little Boy: A Kindertransport Story (2013)
