= Henry Foner =

American social activist (1919–2017)

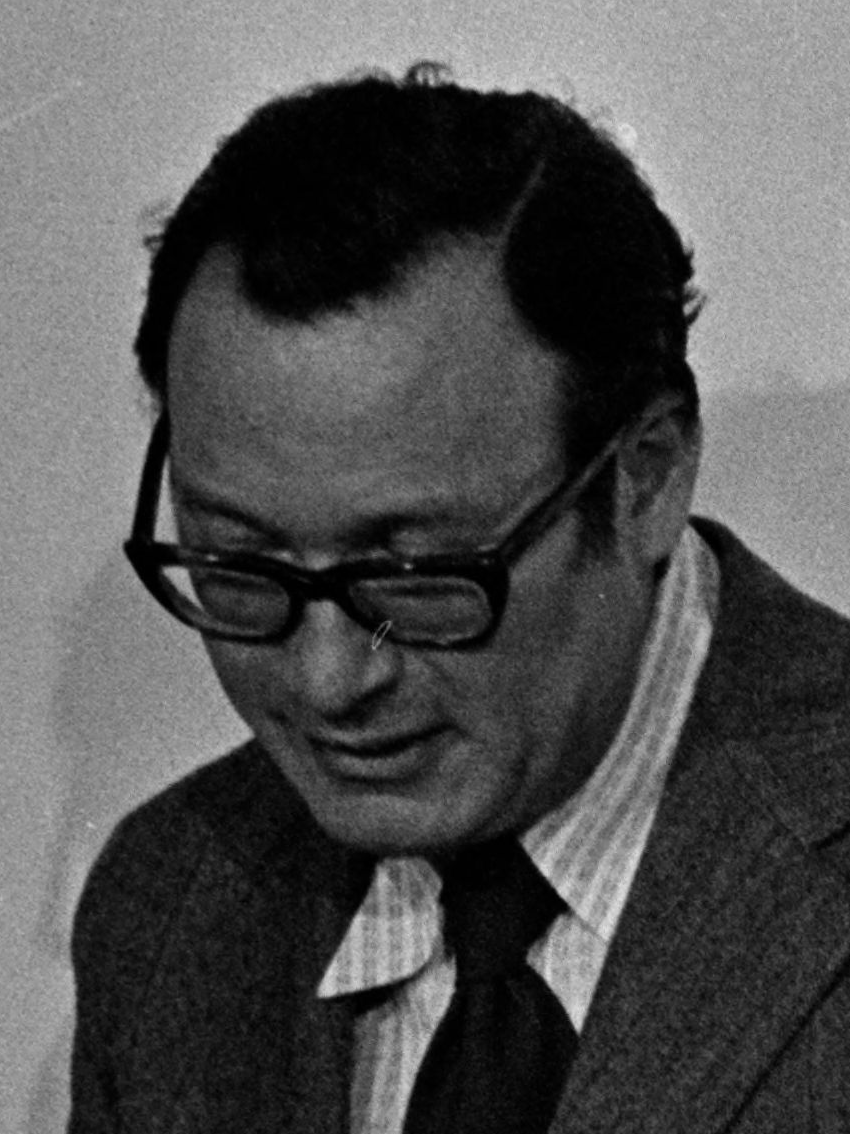
- Foner in 1973
- Born: Henry Joseph Foner; March 23, 1919; Brooklyn, New York City, U.S.
- Died: January 11, 2017 (aged 97); Brooklyn, New York City, U.S.
- Occupations: Labor union leader, social activist, songwriter
- Years active: 1939–2009
- Organization: Joint Board, Fur, Leather and Machine Workers Union (FLM)
- Spouse: Lorraine Lieberman
- Children: 2
- Relatives: Jack D. Foner (brother); Philip S. Foner (brother); Moe Foner (brother); Eric Foner (nephew); Nancy Foner (niece)
- Awards: Legion of Merit; Military Valor Cross; Brooklyn Jewish Hall of Fame

Henry Joseph Foner (March 23, 1919 – January 11, 2017) was a 20th-century Jewish-American social activist and president of the Joint Board, Fur, Leather and Machine Workers Union (FLM).

He and his three older brothers started careers in teaching (the older three were all rising young professors in college). In the 1940s all were banned from teaching in New York because of earlier affiliations with communist organizations. Foner became a union activist and leader, serving as FLM president from 1961 to 1988.

== Background ==
Henry Foner was born on March 23, 1919, the youngest of four brothers. He was raised in the Williamsburg neighborhood of Brooklyn, New York. His father Abraham Foner delivered seltzer; his mother Mary Smith was a homemaker. He and his three older brothers all became active in leftist politics. Two brothers (Philip and Jack) became professional historians. The other two brothers (Moe and Henry) were union activists, although Moe first taught in college, too.

Foner was said to be a member of the Young Communist League as a youth, and later wrote a song called "Love in the YCL".

He attended Eastern District High School and earned a degree in business administration from the City College of New York in 1939, near the end of the Great Depression.

== Career ==
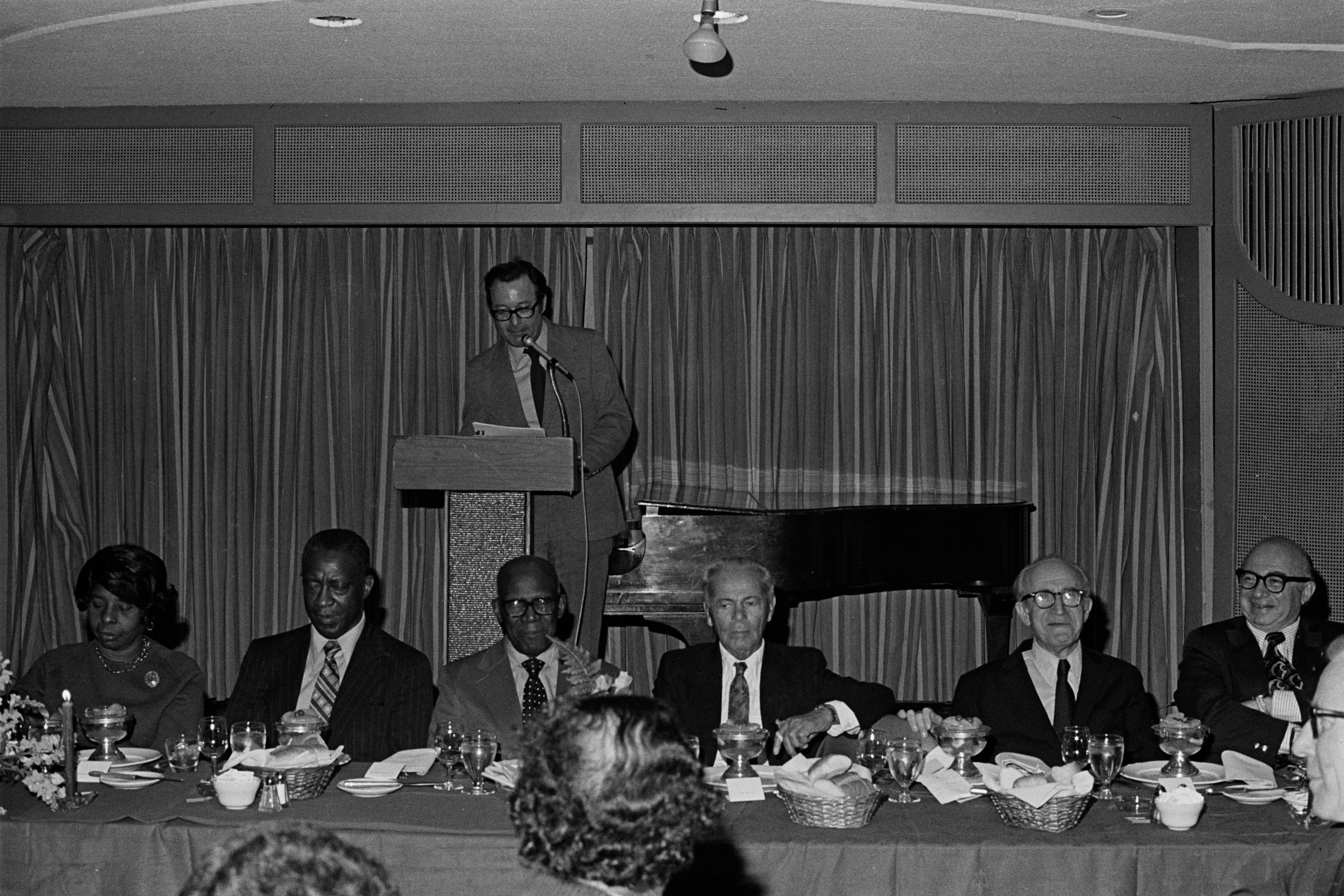
Foner speaks at a birthday dinner for Irving Potash (seated, second from right) at Tavern on the Green in New York City, November 16, 1972

Foner began his work career by organizing an anti-World War II puppet show. Like his older brothers, he began teaching at the Samuel J. Tilden High School. (Unlike the other three, who completed graduate degrees and became university professors, Foner taught high school.) Colleagues there included future comedian Sam Levenson.

From 1942 to 1946, Foner served in the U.S. Army in Italy and Austria (where he was part of the occupation forces). He was awarded the Legion of Merit and the Italian Military Valor Cross.

After his return from the war, Foner resumed teaching, as a substitute in stenography and typewriting at Prospect Heights High School, from 1946 to 1948. After passing his teaching exam, in 1948 he was blocked by the Rapp-Coudert Committee from formal appointment due to earlier involvement in the American Student Union and Young Communist League. Fear of communism in the United States was rising. "Both Philip and Jack [Foner] were fired from teaching posts in the City University of New York in 1941 during a purge by the New York State Legislature's Rapp-Coudert Committee, which also cost Moe his administrative post at City College and Henry his job as a substitute teacher in New York high schools."

With all four brothers banned from teaching, they formed a jazz band and played at Jewish resorts in the Catskill Mountains, with Henry playing saxophone and composing songs (see "Songs" below).

== Unions ==
Foner became a labor union leader and social activist. According to Ron Radosh, at least, he was a "lifelong fellow traveler", aligned with socialist and communist causes.).

From 1940 to 1948, Foner was a member of the Teachers Union. In 1948, still denied a career in education, he became director for welfare and education at what was then the Joint Board Fur Dressers' and Dryers' Union, later known as the Joint Board, Fur, Leather and Machine Workers Union ("FLM").

In 1961, Foner was elected as FLM president, being re-elected and serving until 1988. The union represented members in the Mid-Atlantic states of New York, New Jersey, Delaware, Pennsylvania, and West Virginia.

Over the years, he worked on issues from promoting civil rights to protesting the Vietnam War. He served as vice-chairman of the Liberal Party of New York. In 1973, Foner went to Spain to observe a Carabanchel Ten trial.

Foner has said that, during his decades in the FLM, he worked to keep the union free of corruption, and to insulate the union from criticism that it was Communist-led. For the latter goal, Foner helped to arrange a merger of the FLM with the Amalgamated Meat Cutters union in the late 1950s. He also "helped to organize union representation at the Labor Assembly for Peace in Chicago".

He was a "leader of the Liberal Party" (of New York), founded in 1944 by George Counts as alternative to the American Labor Party which was perceived to be unduly influenced by communists. (Co-founders of the Liberal Party included: David Dubinsky of the ILGWU, Alex Rose of the Hat, Cap and Millinery Workers, theologian Reinhold Niebuhr, and teacher-turned-politician Ben Davidson.)

== Retirement ==
In 1988, Foner retired from the union. For many years, he taught labor history and wrote a column for the journal Jewish Currents. He also served on its editorial board.

He served as president of the Paul Robeson Foundation. He also served as editor of Work History News (newsletter of the New York Labor History Association. In 2000, he co-founded Labor Arts.

Foner was also a songwriter. He co-wrote (with Norman Franklin) the musical, Thursdays 'Til Nine, presented in 1947 by the Department Store Employees Union. He performed for the Catskills Institute on many occasions. Recordings of his several performances from 1997 to 2004 are available. He was a long-time friend of Pete Seeger, whom he knew for more than 60 years. Seegar played for numerous rallies and marches for his union. "Seeger was a member of the New York Labor History Association. In 2009, he played his five-string banjo and other instruments at the 90th birthday celebration of his friend and comrade, Henry Foner."

In 2009, he gave an interview about his life experiences:

Foner discusses his background as a political activist, musician, and teacher. At the time of his entrance into the fur and leather workers' union, Sam Burt was head of the Joint Board, and Ben Gold international president of furriers' union. He describes the leadership style and significant activities of Gold. In the late 50s, Foner was partially responsible for arranging a merger with the meat cutters' union, a move which helped to insulate the formerly Communist-led furriers from further political attacks. He discusses the political liabilities of the Communist presence in union leadership, and steps which Gold took to diffuse or preempt criticism. He describes the corruption in the labor movement in the 50s and 60s as well as the furriers' avoidance of corruption under its leftist leadership. He discusses Mayor Lindsay's campaign and administration, and the change in the Liberal Party stance on the Vietnam War, as well as the Party's decision-making dynamics and relationship with the ILGWU. He helped to organize union representation at the Labor Assembly for Peace in Chicago. He explains his own reasons for his engagement with the Liberal Party, and describes relations with politicians and labor leaders such as Lindsay, Ed Koch, David Dubinsky, Al Shanker, Victor Gotbaum, and Jack Sheinkman. Also discussed is the union's position on imports and animal rights. He compares and contrasts the policies and histories of the Amalgamated, ILGWU, and his own union. Mentioned are the Ocean Hill-Brownsville crisis and teachers' strike of 1968. The interview concludes with a discussion of the way in which the furriers' union dealt with ethnic and racial diversity in contrast to that of the ILGWU, and the unions' position on immigration, as well as Foner's own.

== Personal and death ==
Foner was the youngest of four brothers who became prominent in New York City:

- Jack D. Foner (1910–1999): historian, twin of Philip S. Foner (and father of historian Eric Foner)
- Philip S. Foner (1910–1994), historian and political activist, twin of Jack D. Foner
- Moe Foner (1916–2002): trade union activist

In 1948, he married Lorraine Lieberman (March 2, 1923 – April 22, 2002).

His niece is Nancy Foner, Distinguished Professor of Sociology at Hunter College.

Foner died on January 11, 2017, at the age of 97, from cardiovascular disease. A memorial service was held for Foner on April 4, 2017, in New York City at the Local 1199 SEIU Penthouse.

== Awards ==
For service during WWII, Fonder was awarded both the Legion of Merit and the Italian Military Valor Cross.

In 2015, the Brooklyn Jewish Historical Initiative inducted Foner as a "labor activist" among a dozen people – "some of the borough's most accomplished sons and daughters" – as the first class of the "Brooklyn Jewish Hall of Fame".

== Legacy ==
=== Activism ===
In his obituary of Foner for the New York Times, Sam Roberts summed up his life as follows:

Henry J. Foner [was] the last of four brothers from New York City who were denied academic jobs in the 1940s for Communist ties and later were champions of organized labor, higher education and progressive political causes.

Nephew Eric Foner of Columbia University recalled:

Along with his brother Moe, Henry was among a group of labor leaders who survived McCarthyism to bring a New Deal kind of left-labor activism to New York City, which survives to this day. ... They also challenged the AFL–CIO to mobilize against the Vietnam War.

=== Humor ===
Foner was known for his humor. It is expressed in several of the songs he composed (see "Songs" below). His obituary relates the following anecdote:

In 2008, the morning after he underwent hip replacement surgery, Mr. Foner was visited in his hospital room by his surgeon.

"I expected the routine inquiry about my condition," Mr. Foner recalled, "and almost fell out of my bed when he asked me, as though he were talking to my body, 'Which side are you on?'"

The question was not only surprising—coming from the surgeon who had only recently operated on him—but it also happened to be the title of an anthem of the labor movement.

Naturally, Mr. Foner pointed to his left side.

== Works ==
Songs:

Foner composed many songs, including those collected (and some with publicly available audio recordings) courtesy of Labor Arts. These include a collection of songs for the musical Thursday Till 9.

- "I'm Getting an F in Romance" (1938)
- "Shakin' the Dies" (1938)
- "Confidentially, We Think" (1939)
- "Yes, My Darling Daughter" (1939)
- "Lament of the Substitute Teacher" (1940)
- "You're Just My Type" (1940)
- "'V' for Victory" (1942)
- "Shoot the Strudel to Me, Yudel" (1941) (song)
- "Thoughts on a Division Headquarters Clean-Up Detail" (1943)
- "The Passionate Company Clerk to His Love" (1943)
- "Song of the Pennies" (with Norman Franklin) (1946)
- "The Vibrating Rhumba" (1946)
- "The Co-op Housing Blues" (1947)
- "Thursdays Till Nine" (with Norman Franklin) (1947)
- "How Long the Day" (1947)
- "The Ballad of the Bra" (1947)
- "The Selling Union" (1947)
- "Here's Paul Robeson" (1949)
- "Seasons Greetings and a Happy New Year" (1980)
- "A Wedding Toast to Lyn Garafola and Eric Foner" (1980)
- "For the Brooklyn Philharmonics on its 30th Birthday" (1984)
- "37th Birthday Greetings to Diane Foner" (1989)
- "To My Brother Jack on His 85th Birthday" (1995)
- "To the Radiology-Oncology Personnel at St. Vincent's" (1999)
- "The Ode That's Owed to Keri" (2004)
- "A Fond Farewell to Fair Elaine" (2004)
- "91st Birthday Greetings for Irwin Corey" (2005)
- "20-20 Lines to My Ophthamologist" (2007)
- "Lament of an ex-Federal Prosecutor" (2007)

Poems:

- "Stations in Life" (2000)

Books:

- Songs and Poems: For Better or Verse (Jewish Currents, 2015)

Books edited:

- Paul Robeson: Essays on His Life and Legacy, edited by Joseph Dorinson and William Pencak, foreword by Henry Foner (Jefferson, NC: McFarland, 2002)
- A Song of Social Significance: Memoirs of an Activist with Dorothy Epstein and Ruby Dee (Teaneck, NJ: Ben Yehuda Press, 2007)

Articles:

- "From the Bandstand" (1997)
- "At the Rosenberg Commemoration" (2000)
- "From the Bandstand: The Odyssey of a Catskills Resort Musician" (2015)

Plays:

- My Fair Chelm, script by Harold Farbstein, lyrics by Henry Foner (1971)

== See also ==
- Nancy Foner (daughter)
- Jack D. Foner (brother)
- Philip S. Foner (brother)
- Moe Foner (brother)
- Eric Foner (nephew)
- International Fur & Leather Workers Union

== External sources ==
- Robers, Sam (January 19, 2017). "Henry J. Foner, Labor Leader Accused of Communist Ties, Dies at 97". The New York Times.
- "Guide to the Henry Foner Papers and Photographs TAM.254". NYU Tamiment Library. July 10, 2014.
- "Henry Foner - ILGWU Heritage Project". Cornell University - ILR School - Kheel Center. June 10, 2009. Archived from the original on June 18, 2012.
- "Team". Labor Arts.
- "Henry Foner". Dreamers and Fighters: The NYC Teacher Purges. 2009.
- Getty Images: Henry Foner
- Brooklyn Eagle: images of Henry Foner
- New York Times 2002 photo of Henry Foner
- Marxmail: Foner Brothers jazz band 1940s (Henry Foner on saxophone)
- Henry Foner at IMDb
