= Moe Foner =

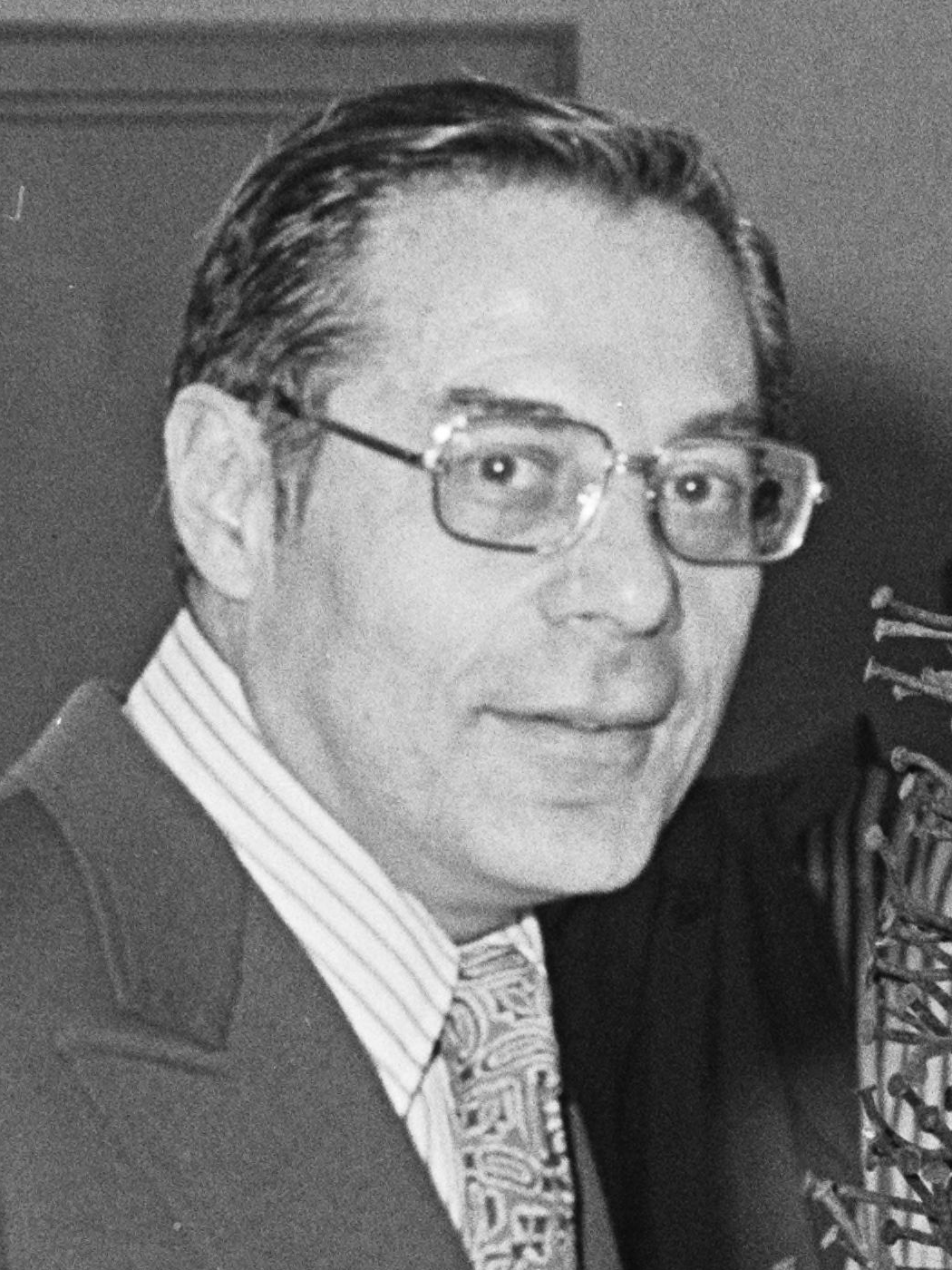
Foner in 1973

Morris "Moe" Foner (August 3, 1915 – January 10, 2002) was a labor leader active in Union 1199, the New York Health and Human Service Union.

== Biography ==
=== Early years ===
Foner was born and raised in the Williamsburg neighborhood of Brooklyn. His parents were Polish Jews who had four sons, all of whom became active in leftist politics. His brothers Philip and Jack were professional historians (Jack was also the father of historian Eric Foner). Henry Foner led the Furriers' Union.

=== Union career ===
Foner started out as a leader in Department Store Local 1250, then moved on to Union 1199, where he became the director of education and culture. While there, he founded Bread and Roses, a cultural program for union members funded by the NEA.

Foner wrote the foreword to Women of Hope: African Americans Who Made A Difference, a children's book by Joyce Hansen. The book featured images from a Bread and Roses poster series which aimed to "honor courageous, creative women of color whose persistence and vision gave society hopefulness and inspiration."

=== Death and legacy ===
Foner died on January 10, 2002. His daughter Nancy Foner is a sociologist.
