= Jack D. Foner =

American historian

- Born: Jack Donald Foner; December 14, 1910; Williamsburg, Brooklyn, New York City, U.S.
- Died: December 10, 1999 (aged 88); Manhattan, U.S.
- Education: City College of New York; Columbia University
- Occupation: Historian
- Notable work: Blacks and the Military in American History (1974)
- Children: 2, inc. Eric Foner
- Relatives: Philip S. Foner (brother); Henry Foner (brother); Moe Foner (brother); Nancy Foner (niece)

Jack Donald Foner (December 14, 1910 – December 10, 1999) was an American historian best known for his work on the labor movement and the struggle for African-American civil rights. A professor of American history with a doctorate from Columbia University, he established one of the first programs in black studies in the United States at Colby College.

He was fired from his job at City College of New York and blacklisted in academia from the 1940s through much of the 1960s after being investigated in 1941 by a New York State legislative committee for his suspected former membership in the Communist Party, which he officially refused to either confirm or deny. In 1979, the New York State Board of Education officially apologized to Foner and other teachers and staff who were fired and whose lives were disrupted by the activities of the Rapp-Coudert Committee, which it described as having egregiously violated academic freedom. He was the twin brother of historian Philip S. Foner and the father of historian Eric Foner.

== Early life and education ==
Jack Foner was born in Williamsburg, Brooklyn, in 1910 to Jewish parents who had immigrated from the Russian empire. He was one of four brothers: his twin brother, Philip Foner, would later become a Marxist labor historian and political activist, while their younger brothers Henry Foner and Moe Foner would both become labor union organizers. Jack Foner attended Eastern District High School and graduated from City College of New York in 1929. He and Philip both studied under historian Allan Nevins there. Foner earned a master's degree in 1933 and a doctorate in 1967 in American history, both from Columbia University.

== Early career ==
Jack Foner taught history in 1935 at Baruch College (then called the downtown branch of the City College of New York). He actively supported the Second Spanish Republic against the Nationalist faction, and stood for the rights of African Americans.

== Blacklisting ==
In 1941, Foner was forced out of his teaching job, along with 60 other faculty members, in the wake of an investigation of alleged communist influences in higher education by the New York state legislature's anti-communist Rapp-Coudert Committee. It was officially known as the "Joint Legislative Committee to Investigate the Educational System of the State of New York. One of the complaints against Jack Foner was that his teaching devoted excessive attention to the role of African Americans in history. He declined to testify before the commission and was blacklisted, which meant that he was unable to obtain academic employment for almost three decades.

In 1979, the New York State Board of Higher Education apologized to Foner and others who were investigated and lost jobs due to the activities of the Rapp-Coudert Committee. It described the events of 1941 "an egregious violation of academic freedom."

In 1993, Foner told Colby magazine that he considered the episode to be an "honorable experience". He said, "there was really no evidence to support it," referring to his being fired and blacklisted.

== Later years ==
From 1942 to 1945, during World War II, Foner served in the United States Army. He was stationed in the United States. His assignments were menial.

After the war, Foner supported his family by doing freelance lecturing. He and his three brothers also had a swing music band, in which he played drums, known as the "Foner Orchestra". The group played at resorts in the Catskills. Foner also worked with Paul Robeson and Harry Belafonte, and maintained a friendship with W. E. B. Du Bois, all of whom similarly suffered blacklisting.

== Subsequent academic career ==
Colby College in Waterville, Maine, hired Foner in the spring of 1969 to teach history. He taught there from 1969 to 1976, establishing one of the first black studies programs in the nation. After retiring from Colby, he returned as a visiting scholar in 1983 and 1985.

His best-known book is Blacks and the Military in American History (1974).

Foner returned to New York City. He died in Manhattan on December 10, 1999, four days before his 89th birthday.

== Legacy and honors ==
- 1982, Colby College awarded him an honorary doctorate.

== Personal life ==
Foner and his wife, Liza, were married for 57 years and lived mostly in New York City. They had two children, Eric Foner and Thomas Foner. Eric Foner has become recognized for his work in Civil War, Reconstruction and African-American history and is a professor of history at Columbia University. Thomas died in 1999, the same year as his father.

== See also ==
- Morris U. Cohen
- Morris Schappes
- Moses Finley
- Rapp-Coudert Committee
