= Nancy Foner =

American sociologist

Nancy Foner is an American sociologist, a Distinguished Professor of Sociology at Hunter College, City University of New York, and a published author.

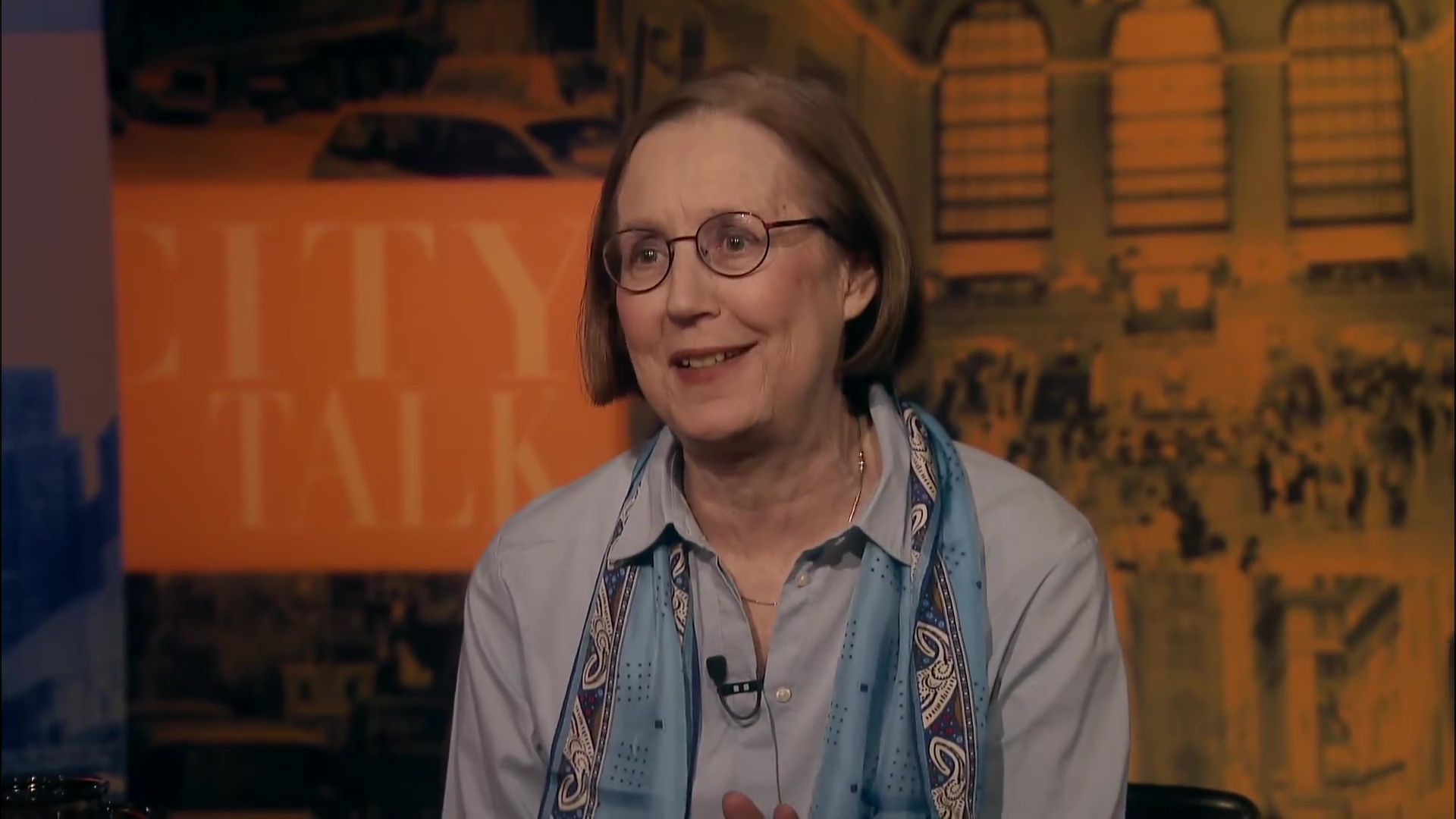
Foner on CUNY TV's City Talk, 2014

Foner is also a member of the American Academy of Arts and Sciences. She has also held the professorships of Distinguished Professor of Anthropology at State University of New York at Purchase and also Lillie and Nathan Ackerman Visiting professor of Equality and Justice at Baruch College, City University of New York.

Foner has served as president of the Eastern Sociological Society (2014–15), chair of the International Migration Section of the American Sociological Association, and president of the Society for the Anthropology of Work and the Society for Urban, National, and Transnational/Global Anthropology.

She is the daughter of Moe Foner, a labor leader, and Anne Foner, a sociology professor. Her uncles are Moe's older twin brothers Jack D. and Philip S. Foner, as well as Henry Foner. Jack's son, the historian Eric Foner, is her cousin.

== Publications ==
- From Ellis Island to JFK: New York's Two Great Waves of Immigration (Yale University Press, 2000)
- In a New Land: A Comparative View of Immigration (New York University Press, 2005)
- Not Just Black and White: Historical and Contemporary Perspectives on Immigration, Race, and Ethnicity in the United States (edited with George Fredrickson, 2004)
- New Immigrants in New York (Columbia University Press, revised edition, 2001)
- Islands in the city: West Indian Migration to New York (University of California Press, 2001)
- and Immigration Research for a New Century: Multidisciplinary Perspectives (edited with Ruben Rumbaut and Steven J. Gold, 2000).
- Across Generations: Immigrant Families in America (New York University Press, 2009)

== External sources ==
- Hunter College: Nancy Foner
- CUNY: Nancy Foner
- Roosevelt Institute: Nancy Foner
- Migration Policy Institute: Nancy Foner
