= Jewish Currents =

American progressive Jewish magazine

- Cover of Summer 2024 issue
- Editor-in-Chief: Arielle Angel
- Former editors: Morris Schappes, Lawrence Bush
- Categories: Jewish arts, literature, politics
- Frequency: Daily (website), quarterly (print)
- Circulation: 5,200
- Founder: Louis Harap
- Founded: 1946
- Country: United States
- Based in: Valley Stream, New York
- Language: English
- Website: jewishcurrents.org
- ISSN: 0021-6399

Jewish Currents, formerly known as Jewish Life, is an American progressive Jewish quarterly magazine founded in 1946. Until 1956, it was affiliated with the Communist Party USA. It features news, political commentary, analysis, and Jewish art and literature. Its content reflects the politics of the Jewish left.

== History ==
=== Communist Party USA ===
The magazine was founded by writers Louis Harap and Morris Schappes and first published in November 1946 by the Morning Freiheit Association under the name Jewish Life. It was associated with the Communist Party USA. It covered issues concerning Jews and Israel from a communist perspective.

According to The New York Times, the magazine was organ of the Communist Party. Its editorial stance aligned with Soviet Union, calling Jews who opposed Joseph Stalin fascists. Jewish Life was known to strongly deny the existence of antisemitism in the Soviet Union. In 1956, when new information surfaced about the 1952 execution of 14 Soviet Jews, Jewish Life published these revelations and lost three-fourths of its subscribers. Editor Carol Jochnowitz said the reason for the decline was that subscribers believed the magazine had "Jewish blood on its hands".

Harap then renamed Jewish Life Jewish Currents and promised it would be more critical of the Soviet Union and Soviet antisemitism. The magazine also began to identify itself with the liberal faction of the Communist Party USA, led by John Gates. The magazine broke from the party in 1956 and began to focus on promoting civil rights and Yiddishkeit.

Jewish Currents broke all ties to the Soviet Union in 1967, when it supported Israel in the Six-Day War. The magazine abandoned its communist editorial position and became a publication for the broader Jewish left.

June 1948 issue of Jewish Life

Harap was the magazine's managing editor from 1948 to 1957. Schappes edited Jewish Currents from 1959 to 2000. After Schappes retired in 2002, Lawrence Bush took his position. Bush had worked for Schappes as an assistant editor from 1979 to 1983.

=== The Workers Circle ===
For a long time, communist editors of Jewish Currents clashed with the liberal socialist leaders of the The Workers Circle on issues such as antisemitism in the Soviet Union and the execution of Czech politician Rudolf Slánský. Many editors of the magazine became disillusioned with the Soviet Union after Stalin's purges and the country's dissolution in 1991, changing their political views and moving closer to The Workers Circle's reformist position.

In 2006, when readership of Jewish Currents began to decline, the magazine merged with The Workers Circle, becoming the organization's official publication. Jewish Currents gained 13,000 new subscribers. The Communist Party USA congratulated the magazine on the merger. Some leaders of The Workers Circle opposed the merger, with one of them saying, "Don't trust those old Commies". The Workers Circle published the magazine till 2009.

=== Relaunch ===
After breaking with CPUSA, the magazine operated in obscurity and became "dormant" at the beginning of the 21st century, but became active again in the late 2010s.

In 2017, Lawrence Bush transferred control of the magazine to a team of young journalists due to his old age. In 2018, Jewish Currents was relaunched with the support of the Puffin Foundation. The magazine redesigned its website and hired a new editorial team composed entirely of Millennial Jews, including writer Arielle Angel as literary editor. She became editor-in-chief that same year. In November 2019, Senator Bernie Sanders published an essay in the magazine on his relationship with Judaism.

In January 2020, Jewish Currents expanded and hired five new writers, including columnist Peter Beinart, a left-wing Zionist. Beinart said he had been in talks with the magazine since 2019 about becoming editor-at-large. In 2021, the magazine apologized to readers for running an advertisement for the Dorot Fellowship, a leadership training program in Israel for American Jews. Some people said the ad was proof that the magazine was secretly Zionist.

In 2022, the magazine had 5,200 subscribers and 12 full-time employees. It was read by more than a million people annually. Its budget was $1.6 million, drawing on its $1 million endowment as well as donations from individuals and foundations. In October 2023, the magazine's popularity rapidly increased, with the number of weekly views increasing tenfold since the October 7 attacks. The number of paid subscribers also increased by 1,000. In 2024, Wikipedia editors decided to downgrade the Anti-Defamation League's credibility rating as a source based on investigations by Jewish Currents.

== Editorial position ==
=== 20th century ===
When Jewish Currents was founded under the name Jewish Life, its stated goal was to oppose McCarthyism and to promote Black–Jewish solidarity, Yiddish culture, anti-racism, and the founding of Israel. The magazine identified as non-zionist. Jewish Life was published by Morning Freiheit Association, which also published Morning Freiheit, a newspaper affiliated with the CPUSA. The New York Times said Jewish Life was a party organ aligned with Soviet Union. David A. Hacker, a member of the magazine's advisory board, said the magazine called Jews who opposed Stalin "fascists" who "must be destroyed". The magazine celebrated Stalin's birthday and denied claims of antisemitism in the Soviet Union, calling them the "Big Lie".

Jewish Life was created as a "Jewish cultural hub of the left". Like other publications affiliated with CPUSA, such as Political Affairs and The Daily Worker, it followed the party line. If the editors did not agree with the party's position, they could be expelled from the magazine. The first issue of Jewish Life supported a single democratic state in Palestine, making it an outlier in the US Jewish community. In 1947, founding editor Louis Harap called Israel's national labor union Histadrut a "Jim Crow" institution for not allowing Palestinian workers to join it and represent them. Jewish Life viewed Jews not as a nation but as a people, since they had no common territory or culture, and advocated life in the Jewish diaspora instead of creating Israel. In 1948, the magazine supported the creation of Israel, calling the partition of Palestine a "great and historic event" despite previously calling it "undemocratic". The magazine supported Israeli militias during the 1948 Arab–Israeli War. The June 1948 issue was titled "That the Jewish State May Live" and urged people to donate blood for Israeli troops.

In 1956, when Soviet leader Nikita Khrushchev confessed to purges committed by Stalin and new information surfaced about the execution of 14 Jewish writers in 1952, Harap distanced the magazine from the USSR and took a more critical view of it, including Soviet antisemitism. But Jewish Currents did not cut all ties with the Soviets till 1967, when it supported Israel during the Six-Day War and the USSR condemned it. Later, the magazine renounced its communist editorial stance but remained firmly left-wing. Under Shappes's leadership, the magazine gradually transformed from a communist into a democratic socialist publication.

=== 21st century ===
In 2018, Jewish Telegraphic Agency called Jewish Currents a non-Zionist publication that supported Israel's right to exist. In 2021, The Jerusalem Post called the magazine a "leading voice of the American Jewish left". The magazine became highly critical of Israel and supported the Palestinian right of return and boycotts of Israeli businesses in the occupied West Bank. According to Sublation Magazine, under its new leadership, the magazine has shifted from Progressive Zionism to anti-Zionism.

BuzzFeed News said Jewish Currents wanted to appeal to "young, progressive American Jews" who "don't identify with communal institutions' consensus on Israel". Jewish outlets Sapir and Washington Jewish Week called the magazine "far-left". The People's World called the magazine anti-imperialist.

Intelligencer said Jewish Currents "brings together in its pages the aspirations of the Jewish left and the Palestinian liberation movement". The New Yorker said the magazine has extensively documented evictions of Palestinians from their homes in the West Bank by Israeli authorities and employs many Palestinian contributors. Columbia Journalism Review said Jewish Currents "embraces an anti-Zionist stance". Le Monde said Jewish Currents aims to "amplify the voice, worldview, and legacy of anti-Zionist left-wing Jews". It also said the magazine's readers are anti-capitalist, anti-racist and pro-Palestinian rights.

In a 2023 interview, Editor Arielle Angel called Jewish Currents a "magazine for a community, not a party". She said that despite being left-wing, the magazine does not endorse candidates or support any political parties. She said the magazine continues the Communist Party's legacy by "fighting for economic justice and racial justice". Jewish Currents did not condemn the October 7 attacks on Israel. Angel told The New Yorker that this was because the magazine was not interested in political responses or mobilizing people. In a 2026 interview with Haaretz, Angel said a "critical mass" of US Jews are "disgusted with Israel", that many anti-Zionist Jews are excluded from mainstream Jewish institutions, and that she sees Jewish Currents as a place for them.

== Reception ==
In December 2020, Richard Kuper of Jewish Voice for Liberation criticized Jewish Currents for publishing an "unbalanced" analysis of Jeremy Corbyn's performance as Labour Party leader.

In 2023, liberal Zionist intellectual Yehuda Kurtzer wrote in The Forward that Jewish Currents had become "entirely disinterested in the claims of Jewish peoplehood and solidarity". He said there had been a change in the American Jewish political landscape since the October 7 attacks, and it has been foreshadowed when Jewish Currents published an article in 2021 that supported resistance against Israel "by any means necessary". Kurtzer also noted that one Jewish Currents contributor tweeted "Glory to the resistance" after the attacks.

In November 2023, former Jewish Currents editor Mitchell Abidor called the magazine the "most important voice on the Jewish left today", but criticized it for not condemning the October 7 attacks. He also criticized Angel's article about the attacks, in which she wrote that she shed "tears of hope" when Palestinian bulldozers tore down Israeli fences. Abidor said the article lacked "expression of sorrow" for the deaths of Jews during the attack. He said he was "embarrassed and even angered" by the magazine's reaction to the attacks.

In 2024, Arash Azizi of Liberties: Journal of Culture and Politics called Jewish Currents hostile to Israel and its society, including the Israeli left, viewing Israel's existence as "ethnonationalist". Azizi said such views contradict Marxism, which allows ethno-national communities to create their own countries and have self-determination.

In October 2025, The Times of Israel blogger Ralph Zelinger said Jewish Currents had turned "virulently anti-Zionist" after it changed leadership in 2018 and called this a "profound disappointment". In December 2025, journalist and columnist M. Gessen praised Jewish Currents's "mix of reporting and commentary, all executed with the highest journalistic standards". They also said it has "more courage than most mainstream outlets" for publishing a self-induced abortion guide and internal documents of Anti-Defamation League.

== Awards ==
In July 2022, Jewish Currents received 16 Rockower Awards from American Jewish Press Association. In 2024, Jewish Currents received Community Champion Award from Institute for Nonprofit News for its podcast series On The Nose, which is focused on discussing the Gaza war.

On April 11, 2025, Jewish Currents along with SF Public Press received an Izzy Award from Park Center for Independent Media for "outstanding achievement in independent media". On April 30, representative of Jewish Currents Alex Kane attended a celebration at Ithaca College where he was presented with the award. The magazine was recognized at the ceremony for its coverage of the Gaza Strip.
