= Irving Fajans =

American film editor and activist (1916–1968)

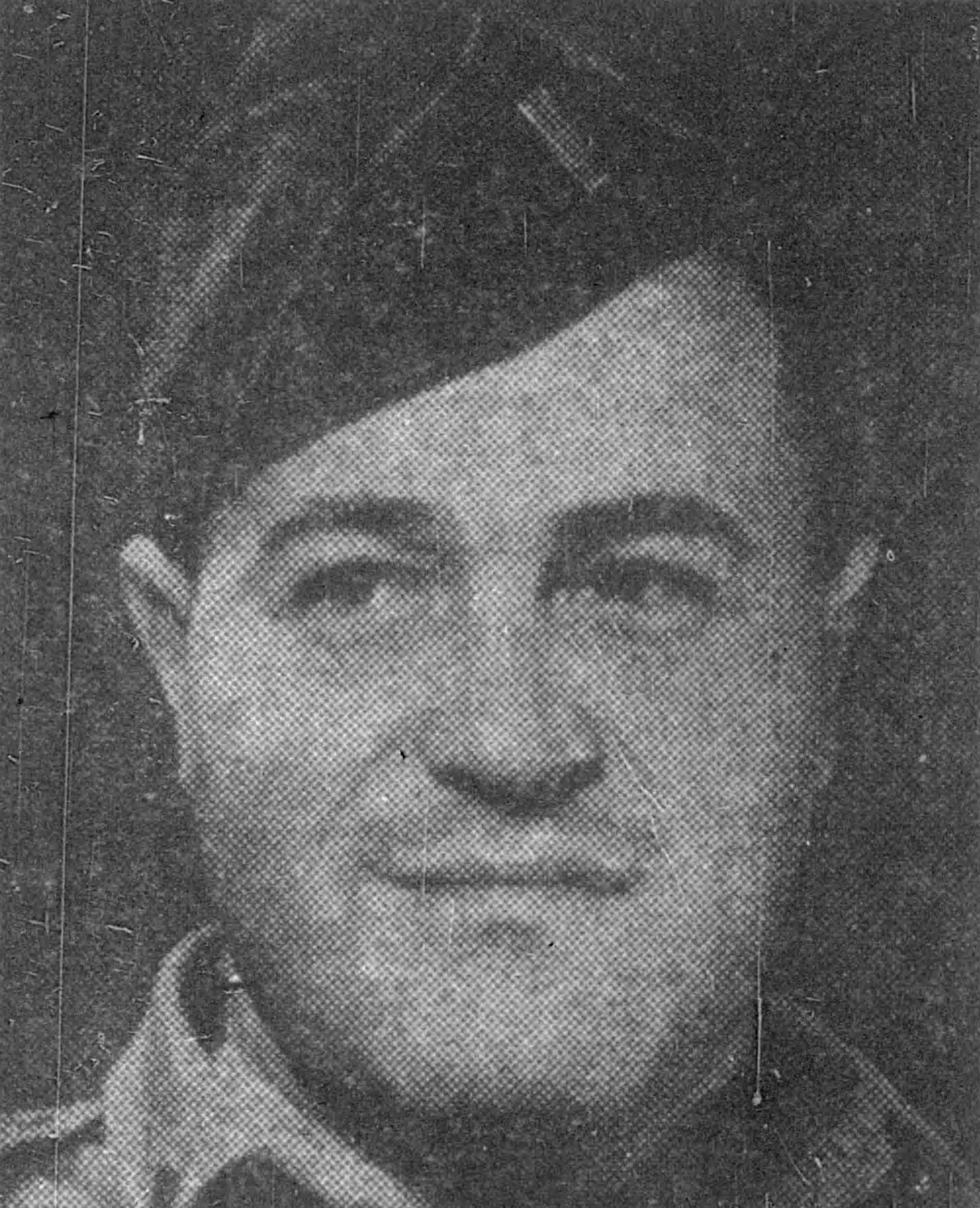
2nd Lieutenant Irving Fajans in uniform c. 1944

Isidore Irving Fajans (1916–1968) was an American film editor and political activist.

== Biography ==
Born in Brooklyn, New York in a Jewish family, Fajans joined the Young Communist League USA in 1932 and became involved in union organizing at Macy's department store. His activism continued with his service in the Lincoln Brigade during the Spanish Civil War, where he was wounded. Despite facing political discrimination during his military service in World War II, Fajans joined the Office of Strategic Services (OSS) and aided the Italian partisan movement.

In 1945, he was one of 16 Army officers and enlisted men singled out as alleged Communists by the House Committee on Military Affairs. General "Wild Bill" Donovan came to their defense, citing their loyalty and effectiveness.

After the war, Fajans was active in veterans' affairs, serving as executive secretary of the Veterans of the Abraham Lincoln Brigade and opposing censorship within the organization. Leveraging the G.I. Bill, he transitioned into filmmaking, becoming known for his work on Salt of the Earth, a documentary about a New Mexico zinc miners' strike, notable for its depiction of labor and gender issues. The film, however, led to Fajans being blacklisted, which forced him into freelance work and teaching filmmaking at the School of Visual Arts in New York City.

Fajans died of a heart attack in 1968 at the age of 52, during a resurgence of interest in his film career.
