= Philip S. Foner =

American labor historian (1910–1994)

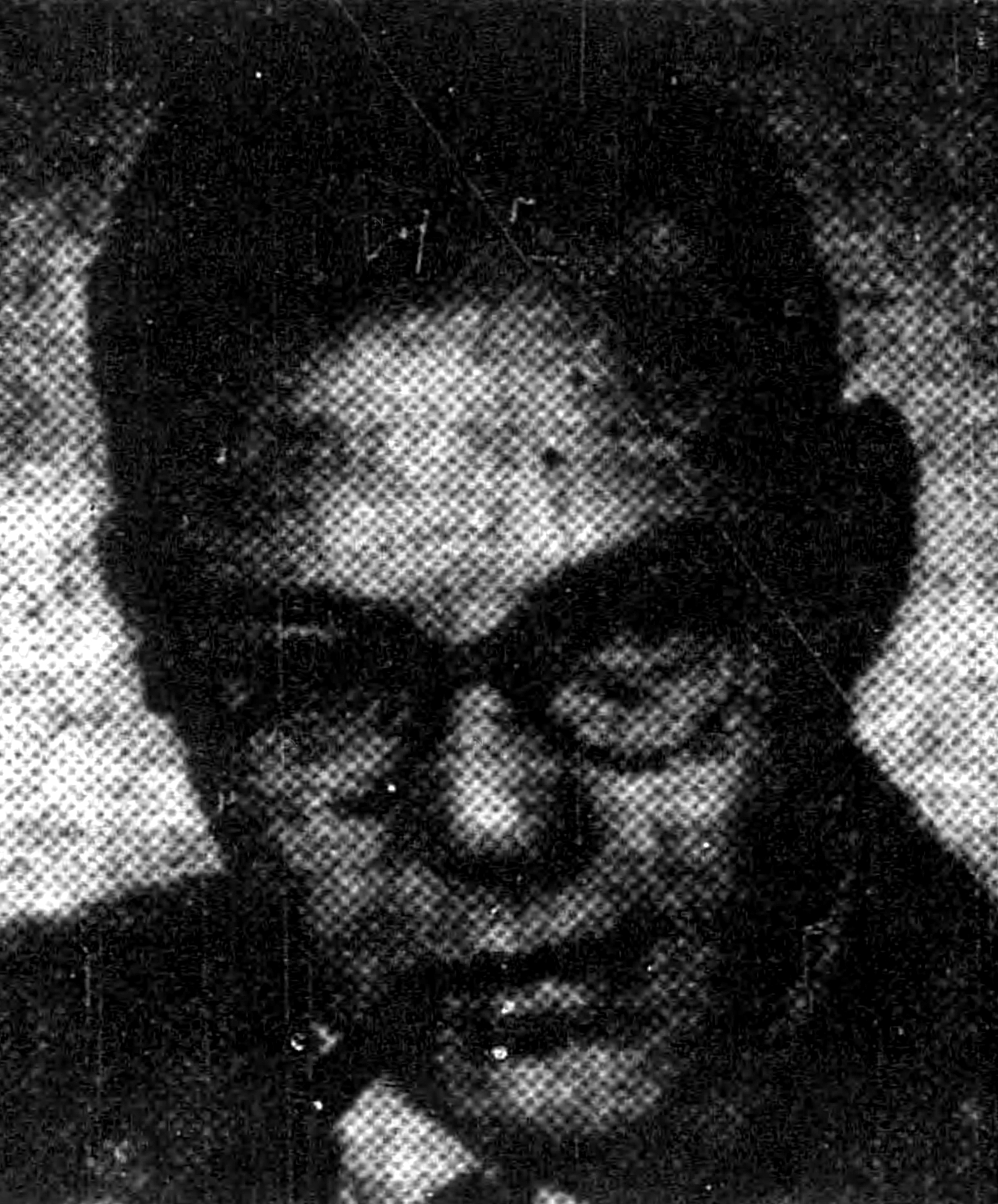
- Foner c. 1950
- Born: Philip Sheldon Foner; December 14, 1910; New York City, U.S.
- Died: December 13, 1994 (aged 83); Philadelphia, U.S.
- Education: City College of New York; Columbia University
- Occupations: Labor historian and teacher
- Notable work: History of the Labor Movement in the United States (10 vols)
- Spouse: Roslyn Held (m. 1939, died)
- Children: 2 daughters
- Relatives: Jack D. Foner (brother); Henry Foner (brother); Moe Foner (brother); Eric Foner (nephew); Nancy Foner (niece)

Philip Sheldon Foner (December 14, 1910 – December 13, 1994) was an American labor historian and teacher. Foner was a prolific author and editor of more than 100 books. He is considered a pioneer in his extensive works on the role of radicals, Black Americans, and women in American labor and political history, which were generally neglected in mainstream academia at the time. A Marxist thinker, he influenced more than a generation of scholars, inspiring some of the work published by younger academics from the 1970s on. In 1941, Foner became a public figure as one among 26 persons fired from teaching and staff positions at City College of New York for political views, following an investigation of communist influence in education by a state legislative committee, known as the Rapp-Coudert Committee.

Foner is best remembered for his 11-volume History of the Labor Movement in the United States, published between 1947 and 1994. He also edited the five-volume collection The Life and Writings of Frederick Douglass, and wrote a biography of the abolitionist leader. His works Organized Labor and the Black Worker, (1974 and 1982 editions) and the two-volume Women in the American Labor Movement (1979 and 1980) also broke new ground in history. For his American Labor Songs of the Nineteenth Century (1975), Foner received the Deems Taylor Award, presented by the American Society of Composers, Authors and Publishers (ASCAP).

His scholarship, publications and political affiliations were considered to be on the far left. In 1979, the New York State Board of Higher Education formally apologized to Foner and other persons who lost their jobs as a result of the Rapp-Coudert Committee, saying it had seriously violated academic freedom. The New York Labor History Association had awarded Foner a lifetime achievement award in 1994. It reiterated its support in 2003 that the value of his work exceeded his shortcomings.

== Background ==
Foner was born in 1910 into an Eastern European immigrant family on the Lower East Side of New York City. His parents were Jewish immigrants from the Russian Empire. Foner grew up in Williamsburg, Brooklyn, and graduated from Eastern District High School.

Philip Foner had three brothers, who also became important figures in the American Left, coming to adulthood during the Great Depression. His twin brother Jack D. Foner (1910–1999) became a professional historian, and was the father of historian Eric Foner. Two other brothers were leading unionists: Moe Foner was active in 1199 of the United Healthcare Workers and was particularly notable for running the union's cultural programs. Henry Foner led the Furriers' Union.

Foner obtained his bachelor's degree from the City College of New York (CCNY) in 1932, where he and his brother Jack were both students of historian Allan Nevins. He earned his master's degree from Columbia University in 1933. He was then accepted into Columbia's Doctoral program in 1934 with a scholarship. In 1941, he received his Ph.D.

== Career ==
Foner became an instructor of history at City College of New York in 1933, the same year in which he obtained his master's degree. He taught there through 1941, when his first book was published, Business and Slavery: The New York Merchants and the Irrepressible Conflict.

Foner was one of 26 faculty and staff members of City College who were fired from their jobs by the end of 1942 as a result of an investigation of communist influences in higher education by the New York State Legislature's Rapp-Coudert Committee. Established in spring 1940, it was officially known as the Joint Legislative Committee to Investigate the Educational System of the State of New York. Foner and 40 other faculty members at CCNY were subsequently brought under investigation for supposed associations and membership with the Communist Party USA (CPUSA) on March 7, 1941. Foner testified at the investigative hearings a month later in April, during which he denied being a member of the CPUSA.

The next month he was brought up on charges by the Board of Higher Education's Conduct Committee. In August the Board held a trial in his case on charges that he belonged to the Communist Party, had participated in such related activities as the publication of The Teacher-Worker, a newsletter of a Communist Party unit active at City College; and had given false testimony at his hearing. The trial committee made a report recommending his dismissal in November 1941.

Foner's three brothers: his twin Jack, a professor of history at CCNY; Moe, a worker in the CCNY registrar's office; and Henry, a substitute teacher in the New York City public schools, were also caught up in the investigation. They were fired from their jobs as well.

After his dismissal from City College, Foner became a principal and chief editor for Citadel Press, based in New York City. This was his primary means of survival during the years of being blacklisted.

In 1947, the first volume of what would become Foner's magnum opus, A History of the Labor Movement of the United States, was released by International Publishers, a publisher considered close to the Communist Party USA. Writing as a Marxist, Foner emphasized the role of the working class and their allies in a class struggle dating to the earliest days of the American republic.

One historian described his work as presenting "a formidable challenge to the orthodox John R. Commons interpretation of labor history." This school of thought at the University of Wisconsin considered unionized workers to be improving their position in American capitalism. By contrast, according to historian Nelson Lichtenstein, Foner believed that "unions were part of a broader movement for democratization -- a means of struggling for political and social goals such as equality and power, as well as better wages, hours, and working conditions." He published ten more volumes in this history during his life, with the last, ending at the eve of the Great Depression, published shortly before his death.

In 1949, Foner published the first volume of his multi-volume work, The Life and Writings of Frederick Douglass, also produced by International Publishers in New York City. The work totaled five volumes, being published between 1949 and 1952. His nephew Eric Foner, known for his own work on the Reconstruction era, said that Douglass had been largely forgotten as an important abolitionist and African-American leader when his uncle started publishing his writings.

In 1967, the power of the blacklist finally waned. Philip Foner was hired as a history professor at Lincoln University, a historically black university located near Oxford, Pennsylvania. Foner served here until his retirement in 1979.

Following his retirement, Foner continued to publish books. He usually worked as a co-author and editor of document collections in association with a younger scholar. An historian of a later generation described his style as amassing primary documents, in the manner of some 19th-century historians.

In 1979, nearly three decades after the mass firings at City College, the New York State Board of Higher Education formally apologized to Foner and persons attacked by the Rapp-Coudert Committee, whose lives had been disrupted by firings, political fears and rumors. The Board described the conduct of the Rapp-Coudert Committee as "an egregious violation of academic freedom".

Foner became a professor of history at Rutgers University in Camden, New Jersey, in 1981.

Following his wife Roslyn's death, Foner married again in 1988. His second marriage ended in divorce in 1991.

== Criticism ==
Foner's work was politically controversial in a period of American fears about immigrant anarchists, labor unrest, and the power of the Soviet Union and Communist Party. Some historians have also criticized his work on scholarly grounds. In 1971, writing in Labor History journal, historian James O. Morris documented that Foner had plagiarized material from Morris' 1950s unpublished master's thesis in his 1965 book, The Case of Joe Hill. Morris wrote that "About one quarter of the Foner text is a verbatim or nearly verbatim reproduction" of his manuscript, and had other complaints.

Scholars such as labor historian Nelson Lichtenstein acknowledge that Foner's shortcomings were recognized in the 1970s and 1980s, but supporters believe that he still made substantial contributions to the field.

In May 2003, complaints about Foner were discussed among labor historians on H-Labor and in postings at the History News Network, with accusations of plagiarism and sloppy scholarship. Scott McLemee reviewed the controversy in an article in Chronicle of Higher Education and noted that old political debates were being re-opened. Many academics, intellectuals and artists had suffered suppression during the McCarthy era.

Foner's nephew Eric Foner, professor of history at Columbia University said that "his uncle's radical politics are the crux of the recent debate. 'Obviously, any charge of plagiarism needs to be taken seriously,' he says. 'But I think that this controversy is being muddied up with powerful ideological issues that ought to be kept quite separate'."

In May 2003, labor historian Mel Dubofsky accused Philip Foner of having "borrowed wholesale from my then unpublished dissertation" on the Industrial Workers of the World for use in Volume 4 of his History of the Labor Movement in the United States. Dubofsky said that Foner extracted large chunks of this dissertation "without attribution or inverted commas". Dubofsky alleged that Foner had similarly used unpublished work of other young scholars "too numerous to mention". But Dubofsky also noted that many young labor historians in the 1970s felt that Foner had suffered enough in being blacklisted and were reluctant to take any official action against him. He said: "So even the people whose work he had borrowed from freely did not want to say anything."

Historian John Earl Haynes, who has used Soviet archives for his multi-volume work on the American Communist Party, said there had long been criticisms of Foner for plagiarism, but said he was a "hero to radical historians". In a posting on the History News Network, Haynes said that Foner had inaccurately footnoted references to some of Haynes' work.

Eric Foner added another perspective to his uncle's work:

He edited the writings of Frederick Douglass at a time when, believe it or not, nobody remembered him. He edited seven volumes of documents on the history of black labor in the United States, and collections of material from black political conventions in the 19th century. And he did all of it without research assistants or grants. This debate is not doing justice to his contributions to scholarship.

In recognition of the value of the historian's body of work, the president of the New York Labor History Association said it had no plans to revoke the lifetime-achievement award it gave to Foner in 1994.

== Personal life and death ==
Foner married Roslyn Held in 1939. The pair had two daughters, Elizabeth and Laura.

Foner died on December 13, 1994, in Philadelphia, a day before his 84th birthday.

== Awards ==
For his American Labor Songs of the Nineteenth Century (1975), Foner received the Deems Taylor Award, presented by the American Society of Composers, Authors and Publishers (ASCAP).

- In 1994, a few months before his death, Foner "received a lifetime achievement award from the New York Labor History Association.

== Legacy ==
- Historian Nelson N. Lichtenstein described Foner as "a pioneer in the development of labor history as a discipline, in moving it out of the economics department."

== Works ==
=== Books written ===
- Business and Slavery: The New York Merchants and the Irrepressible Conflict. Chapel Hill: University of North Carolina Press, 1941.
- Morale Education in the American Army: War for Independence, War of 1812, Civil War. New York: International Publishers, 1944.
- 'The Jews in American History, 1654–1865. New York: International Publishers, 1945.
- Jack London: American Rebel: A Collection of his Social Writings, Together with an Extensive Study of the Man and his Times New York: The Citadel Press, 1947.
- History of the Labor Movement in the United States. In 11 volumes, 1947–1994, 2022.
  - Vol. 1: From Colonial Times to the Founding of the American Federation of Labor. New York: International Publishers, 1947.
  - Vol. 2: From the Founding of the American Federation of Labor to the Emergence of American Imperialism. New York: International Publishers, 1955.
  - Vol. 3: The Policies and Practices of the American Federation of Labor, 1900–1909. New York: International Publishers, 1964.
  - Vol. 4: Industrial Workers of the World. New York: International Publishers, 1965.
  - Vol. 5: The AFL in the Progressive Era, 1910–1915. New York: International Publishers, 1980.
  - Vol. 6: On the Eve of America's Entrance into World War I, 1915–1916. New York: International Publishers, 1982.
  - Vol. 7: Labor and World War I, 1914–1918. New York: International Publishers, 1987.
  - Vol. 8: Postwar Struggles, 1918–1920. New York: International Publishers, 1988.
  - Vol. 9: The T.U.E.L. to the End of the Gompers Era. New York: International Publishers, 1991.
  - Vol. 10: The T.U.E.L., 1925–1929. New York: International Publishers, 1994.
  - Vol. 11: The Great Depression, 1929-1932. New York: International Publishers, 2022
- The Fur and Leather Workers Union: A Story of Dramatic Struggles and Achievements. Newark, NJ: Nordan Press, 1950.
- A History of Cuba and its Relations with the United States. In 2 volumes, 1962–1963.
  - Volume 1, 1492–1845: From the Conquest of Cuba to La Escalera. New York: International Publishers, 1962.
  - Volume 2, 1845–1895: From the Era of Annexationism to the Outbreak of the Second War for Independence. New York: International Publishers, 1963.
- Frederick Douglass: A Biography. New York: Citadel Press, 1964.
- The Case of Joe Hill. New York: International Publishers, 1965.
- The Bolshevik Revolution: Its Impact on American Radicals, Liberals, and Labor. New York: International Publishers, 1967.
- W.E.B. DuBois Speaks: Speeches and Addresses, 1890–1919. New York: Pathfinder Press, 1970.
- W.E.B. DuBois Speaks: Speeches and Addresses, 1920–1963. New York: Pathfinder Press, 1970.
- American Labor and the Indochina War: The Growth of Union Opposition. New York: International Publishers, 1971.
- The Spanish-Cuban-American War and the Birth of American Imperialism, 1895–1902. New York: Monthly Review Press, 1972.
- Organized Labor and the Black Worker, 1619–1973. New York: Praeger, 1974.
- American Labor Songs of the Nineteenth Century. Urbana: University of Illinois Press, 1975.
- History of Black Americans. Westport, CT: Greenwood Press, 1975.
- Labor and the American Revolution. Westport, CT: Greenwood Press, 1976.
- Blacks in the American Revolution. Westport, CT: Greenwood Press, 1976.
- The Great Labor Uprising of 1877. New York: Monad Press, 1977.
- American Socialism and Black Americans: From the Age of Jackson to World War II. Westport, CT: Greenwood Press, 1977.
- Antonio Maceo: The "Bronze Titan" of Cuba's Struggle for Independence. New York: Monthly Review Press, 1977.
- Essays in Afro-American History. Philadelphia: Temple University Press, 1978.
- Women and the American Labor Movement: From Colonial Times to the Eve of World War I. New York: The Free Press, 1979.
- Women and the American Labor Movement: From World War I to the Present. New York: The Free Press, 1980.
- British Labor and the American Civil War. New York: Holmes and Meier, 1981.
- Women and the American Labor Movement: From the First Trade Unions to the Present. New York: The Free Press, 1982.
- Three Who Dared: Prudence Crandall, Margaret Douglass, Myrtilla Miner: Champions of Antebellum Black Education. With Josephine F. Pacheco. Westport, CT: Greenwood Press, 1984.
- First Facts of American Labor: A Comprehensive Collection of Labor Firsts in the United States. New York: Holmes and Meier, 1984.
- The Other America: Art and the Labour Movement in the United States. With Reinhard Schultz. West Nyack, NY: Journeyman Press, 1985.
- Literary Anti-imperialists. New York: Holmes and Meier, 1986.
- May Day: A Short History of the International Workers' Holiday, 1886-1986. New York: International Publishers, 1986.
- U.S. Labor Movement and Latin America: A History of Workers' Response to Intervention. South Hadley, MA: Bergin and Garvey, 1988.
- U.S. Labor and the Viet-Nam War. New York: International Publishers, 1989.
- Our Own Time A History of American Labor and the Working Day. Greenwood Press 1989

=== Books edited ===
- Basic Writings of Thomas Jefferson. New York : Willey Book Co., 1944.
- George Washington: Selections from his Writings. New York: International Publishers, 1944.
- Abraham Lincoln: Selections from his Writings. New York: International Publishers, 1944.
- The Life and Major Writings of Thomas Paine. New York: Citadel Press, 1945.
- The Complete Writings of Thomas Paine. New York: Citadel Press, 1945.
- Franklin Delano Roosevelt: Selections from his Writings. New York: International Publishers, 1947.
- The Life and Writings of Frederick Douglass (5 volumes). New York: International Publishers, 1950–1955. Supplementary volume 5 published in 1975.
- The Letters of Joe Hill. New York: Oak Publications, 1965.
- Helen Keller, Her Socialist Years: Writings and Speeches. New York: International Publishers, 1967.
- The Autobiographies of the Haymarket Martyrs. New York, AIMS/Humanities Press, 1969.
- The Black Panthers Speak. New York: J.B. Lippincott Company, 1970.
- The Voice of Black America: Major Speeches by Negroes in the United States, 1797–1971. New York: Simon and Schuster, 1972.
- Mark Twain: Social Critic. New York: International Publishers, 1972.
- When Karl Marx Died: Comments in 1883. New York: International Publishers, 1973. (Reprinted in 1983 as Karl Marx Remembered: Comments at the Time of His Death by Synthesis Publications in San Francisco)
- Inside the Monster: Writings on the United States and American Imperialism. By José Marti. New York: Monthly Review Press, 1975.
- The Voice of Black America: Major Speeches by Negroes in the United States, 1797–1900. New York: Capricorn Books, 1975.
- We, the Other People: Alternative Declarations of Independence by Labor Groups, Farmers, Woman's Rights Advocates, Socialists, and Blacks, 1829–1975. Urbana: University of Illinois Press, 1976.
- The Democratic-Republican Societies, 1790–1800: A Documentary Sourcebook of Constitutions, Declarations, Addresses, Resolutions, and Toasts. Westport, CT: Greenwood Press, 1976.
- Frederick Douglass on Women's Rights. Westport, CT: Greenwood Press, 1976.
- The Formation of the Workingmen's Party of the United States: Proceedings of the Union Congress, Held at Philadelphia, July 19–22, 1876. New York: American Institute for Marxist Studies, 1976.
- Our America: Writings on Latin America and the Struggle for Cuban Independence. By José Marti. New York: Monthly Review Press, 1977.
- The Factory Girls: A Collection of Writings on Life and Struggles in the New England Factories of the 1840s. Urbana: University of Illinois Press, 1977.
- Friedrich A. Sorge's Labor Movement in the United States: A History of the American Working Class from Colonial Times to 1890. Westport, CT: Greenwood Press, 1977.
- Our America: Writings on Latin America and the Struggle for Cuban Independence. By José Marti. New York : Monthly Review Press, 1977.
- Paul Robeson Speaks: Writings, Speeches, Interviews, 1918–1974. New York: Brunner/Mazel, 1978.
- Karl Liebknecht and the United States. Chicago: Greenleaf Press, 1978.
- The Black Worker: A Documentary History from Colonial Times to the Present. In 8 volumes. 1978–1984.
  - Volume 1: The Black Worker to 1869. With Ronald L. Lewis. Philadelphia: Temple University Press, 1978.
  - Volume 2: The Black Worker During the Era of the National Labor Union. With Ronald L. Lewis. Philadelphia: Temple University Press, 1978.
  - Volume 3: The Black Worker During the Era of the Knights of Labor. With Ronald L. Lewis. Philadelphia: Temple University Press, 1978.
  - Volume 4: The Black Worker During the Era of the American Federation of Labor and the Railroad Brotherhoods. With Ronald L. Lewis. Philadelphia: Temple University Press, 1979.
  - Volume 5: The Black Worker from 1900 to 1919. With Ronald L. Lewis. Philadelphia: Temple University Press, 1980.
  - Volume 6: The Black Worker: The Era of Post-War Prosperity and the Great Depression, 1920–1936. With Ronald L. Lewis. Philadelphia: Temple University Press, 1981.
  - Volume 7: The Black Worker from the Founding of the CIO to the AFL-CIO merger, 1936–1955. Philadelphia: Temple University Press, 1983.
  - Volume 8: The Black Worker Since the AFL-CIO Merger, 1955–1980. With Ronald L. Lewis and Robert Cvornyek. Philadelphia: Temple University Press, 1984.
- On Education: Articles on Educational Theory and Pedagogy, and Writings for Children from the Age of Gold. By José Marti. New York: Monthly Review Press, 1979.
- Proceedings of the Black State Conventions, 1840–1865: Volume 1: New York, Pennsylvania, Indiana, Michigan, Ohio. With George E. Walker. Philadelphia: Temple University Press, 1979.
- Proceedings of the Black State Conventions: Volume 2: New Jersey, Connecticut, Maryland, Illinois, Massachusetts, California, New England, Kansas, Louisiana, Virginia, Missouri, South Carolina. With George E. Walker. Philadelphia: Temple University Press, 1980.
- Fellow Workers and Friends: IWW Free Speech Fights as Told by Participants. Westport, CT: Greenwood Press, 1981.
- José Martí, Major Poems: A Bilingual Edition. With Elinor Randall. New York: Holmes and Meier Publishers, 1982.
- Kate Richards O'Hare: Selected Writings and Speeches. With Sally M. Miller. Baton Rouge: Louisiana State University Press, 1982.
- Mother Jones Speaks: Collected Writings and Speeches. New York : Monad Press, 1983.
- Black Socialist Preacher: The Teachings of Reverend George Washington Woodbey and his Disciple, Reverend G.W. Slater, Jr. Foreword by Ronald V. Dellums. San Francisco: Synthesis Publications, 1983.
- We Dare be Free: A History of the Labor Movement in the US from Colonial Times through World War I. New York : Joint Board Fur, Leather & Machine Workers Union, Local 1-FLM, 1983.
- Letters to the Chicago Workingman's Advocate, November 26, 1870–December 2, 1871. By Wilhelm Liebknecht. New York: Holmes and Meier, 1983.
- History of Black Americans: From the Compromise of 1850 to the end of the Civil War. Westport, CT: Greenwood Press, 1983.
- Clara Zetkin: Selected Writings. New York: International Publishers, 1984.
- The Anti-Imperialist Reader: A Documentary History of Anti-Imperialism in the United States. With Richard C. Winchester. In 2 volumes. New York: Holmes and Meier, 1984.
- The Workingmen's Party of the United States: A History of the First Marxist Party in the Americas. Minneapolis: MEP Publications, 1984.
- Proceedings of the Black National and States Conventions, 1865–1900. Philadelphia: Temple University Press, 1986.
- Militarism and Organized Labor, 1900–1914. Minneapolis: MEP Publications, 1987.
- American Communism and Black Americans: A Documentary History, 1919–1929. With James S. Allen. Philadelphia: Temple University Press, 1987.
- Black Workers: A Documentary History from Colonial Times to the Present. Philadelphia: Temple University Press, 1988.
- Political Parties and Elections in the United States. By José Marti. Philadelphia: Temple University Press, 1989.
- Black Workers: A Documentary History from Colonial Times to the Present. With Ronald L. Lewis. Philadelphia: Temple University Press, 1989.
- American Communism and Black Americans: A Documentary History, 1930–1934. With Herbert Shapiro. Philadelphia: Temple University Press, 1991.
- William Heighton: Pioneer Labor Leader of Jacksonian Philadelphia: With Selections from Heighton's Writings and Speeches. New York: International Publishers, 1991.
- Racism, Dissent, and Asian Americans from 1850 to the Present: A Documentary History. With Daniel Rosenberg. Westport, CT: Greenwood Press, 1993.
- Northern Labor and Antislavery: A Documentary History. With Herbert Shapiro. Westport, CT: Greenwood Press, 1994.
- Lift Every Voice: African American Oratory, 1787–1900. Tuscaloosa: University of Alabama Press, 1997.
