= Rapp-Coudert Committee =

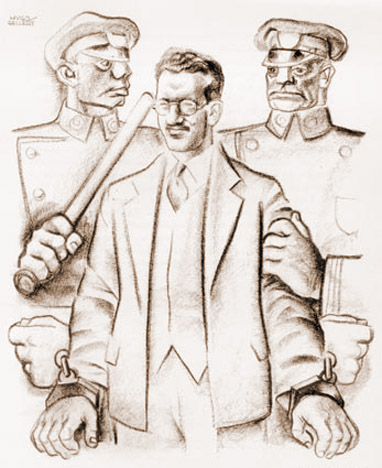
"The Arrest of Morris Schappes," by Hugo Gellert. Schappes was the only individual convicted in a court of law in conjunction with the Rapp-Coudert Committee.

The Rapp-Coudert Committee was the colloquial name of the New York State Legislature's Joint Legislative Committee to Investigate the Educational System of the State of New York. Between 1940 and 1942, the Rapp-Coudert Committee sought to identify the extent of communist influence in the public education system of the state of New York. Its inquiries led to the dismissal of more than 40 instructors and staff members at the City College of New York, actions the committee's critics regarded as a political "witch-hunt."

== Background ==
The government of the state of New York had a long record of activity in the investigation of alleged seditious activities long before the establishment of the Rapp-Coudert Committee in 1940. Two decades earlier, in March 1919, the state had launched a Joint Legislative Committee to Investigate Seditious Activities, headed by Senator Clayton R. Lusk, which had orchestrated raids to seize documents and conducted prosecutions in an effort to publicize and neutralize radical influence in the state.

In the halls of Congress, New York Representative Hamilton Fish III had chaired a Congressional investigative committee in 1930 that took and published extensive testimony on communism in America, which Fish deemed "the most important, the most vital, the most far-reaching, and the most dangerous issue in the world."

New York City, with its massive size and extensive immigrant population, was the headquarters of the Communist Party USA except for a handful of years in the mid-1920s, when the party moved to Chicago, and a focal point for American communist activity.

== Establishment ==
The abrupt change of the American Communist Party line following the signing of the Nazi-Soviet Pact of 1939 thrust the role and influence of the roughly 60,000-member organization into the public eye. Within days after the signing of the political agreement between Nazi Germany, headed by Adolf Hitler, and the Soviet Union, headed by Joseph Stalin, American Communists moved as one from vocal public opposition to fascism as part of a broad Popular Front to advocacy of non-intervention in the erupting European conflict, characterizing the fight between Germany and Britain as an "imperialist war" of little import to the American working class.

The almost instantaneous shift of fundamental policy views of American Communists was seen as indicative that the CPUSA was an organization owing its allegiance to the foreign policy exigencies of a foreign power, the Soviet Union. With war in Europe now foremost in the public consciousness, the anticommunist orientation of many political leaders gained urgency and a mini-Red Scare gripped the public.

In April 1940, the New York State Legislature voted to establish a new investigative body, the Joint Legislative Committee to Investigate the Educational System of the State of New York, which was given the task of publicizing the Communist Party's influence in the publicly funded higher educational bodies of the state. The committee was patterned after the House Un-American Activities Committee, a special committee chaired by Martin Dies Jr. of Texas. The so-called "Dies Committee" was the successor to the Fish Committee of 1930 and forerunner of the House standing committee on un-American activities which was to gain fame and notoriety in the years after World War II.

The new investigative committee came to be known as the "Rapp-Coudert Committee" after its chairmen, Republican Assemblyman Herbert A. Rapp (1891–1964), of Genesee County, and Republican State Senator Frederic René Coudert, Jr. (1898–1972), a lawyer from New York City.

New York was one of four states establishing "little Dies Committees," being joined by California, Oklahoma, and Texas in that distinction. In addition, by 1940 some 21 American states had passed legislation requiring loyalty oaths for teachers.

== Activities ==
The Rapp-Coudert Committee held its hearings from September 1940 to December 1942, focusing on New York City's four public universities — Brooklyn College, City College of New York, Hunter College, and Queens College. Primary attention was placed on the state of affairs at City College, the oldest, largest, and best known of the four New York schools. In all more than 500 faculty, staff, and students of New York's universities were subpoenaed and interrogated during the course of the investigation.

The Rapp-Coudert Committee's investigation was carried out by a subcommittee headed by Senator Coudert, making use of the New York City's former corporation counsel, Paul Windels, as committee counsel. The choice of the widely respected and high-profile Windels, himself a partisan Republican, was intended to lend instant legitimacy and credibility to the controversial work of the committee.

Those called to give testimony by the committee were interrogated at private hearings. They were not allowed legal counsel, the right to cross-examine other witnesses, or even to maintain transcripts of the proceedings. Only one indictment was ever sought by the committee from a grand jury, with Morris U. Schappes indicted, tried, and convicted of perjury in 1941 for his testimony before the Rapp-Coudert Committee.

While the committee did not itself have the power to terminate instructors implicated as members of the Communist Party in its hearings, it served as an impetus to action for the New York Board of Higher Education, the governing body of the city's public colleges (the predecessor to today's City University of New York Board of Trustees). As the committee's work gained increasing public notoriety, the initially resistant Board of Higher Education began to yield to public pressure, resolving itself in November 1940 to fully cooperate with the investigation. Legal advice was sought from the city's current corporation counsel, W.C. Chanler, who advised that faculty and staff members refusing to testify before the committee stood in defiance of the Board's policy directive to cooperate and were thus subject to dismissal.

After hearing extensive testimony, the Rapp-Coudert Committee made its report in 1942 to the New York State Legislature. The committee boasted that it had "exposed" 69 instructors as Communists and gathered additional evidence implicating as radicals another 434 members of the faculty and staff of New York City's college system. While there were no laws banning Americans from membership in the Communist Party, the committee argued that the mere fact of membership indicated that an individual was under the improper discipline of an external conspiratorial power, and thus stood unfit to work in public schools or colleges.

In spring 1941, this opinion was given the force of official policy, when the New York Board of Higher Education prohibited membership of teachers and staff in the Communist Party USA. Refusing to testify before the committee was already a firing offense, giving false testimony to the committee made one subject to perjury, and admission of membership in the Communist Party likewise served as grounds for immediate termination.

The committee's method was to gather accusations from friendly, cooperating witnesses concentrating on Communist Party membership status. One of the committee's chief informers was William Canning, a former member of the Communist Party who taught history at City College. Avidly anti-communist after leaving the CPUSA, Canning bore witness against 54 others for alleged Communist Party ties.

In the wake of the Rapp-Coudert hearings, the Board of Higher Education formed a Conduct Committee that brought charges against faculty and staff members, based on allegations raised in the hearings. Proceedings in the Board of Higher Education trials were led by a three-person committee, composed of members of the Board, that reported its findings and made a recommendation about action to be taken. The charges typically concerned Communist Party membership, with details of related activities, as well as giving false or misleading testimony at the hearings. No charge was ever related to instances of misconduct as a teacher. Historian Stephen Leberstein has neatly summarized the dilemma facing the accused:

With the complicity of board and college officials, the committee was then able to have fired the faculty and staff members who it believed were Communists on the grounds of conduct unbecoming a member of the staff — that is, either non-cooperation with a legislative committee or perjury. Prohibiting teachers from belonging to the party meant that the suspects could be dismissed either for admitting their membership or for denying it if two cooperating witnesses were available to prove perjury. Faced with the committee's deus ex machina, the accused were at a loss for determining how to resist.

== Dismissals ==
By the end of 1942, 19 individuals had been dismissed from City College of New York alone, with another 7 handing in their resignations on their own. Other cases remained pending at the end of the year. Among those affected were Max Yergan, the first Black faculty member ever hired at one of New York City's public colleges; the brothers Philip S. Foner, Jack D. Foner, Harry Foner, and the English tutor Morris U. Schappes.

In all, over 40 teachers and staff members lost their jobs in the early 1940s on account of their political affiliation with the Communist Party or for refusal to co-operate with the legislative inquiry into the same.

== End of committee and legacy ==
The first serious academic study of the Rapp-Coudert Committee was conducted in the early 1950s by Lawrence Chamberlain, a political centrist who was granted access to the private papers of Frederic R. Coudert. Chamberlain held those dismissed in high scholarly esteem:

No one can read through the verbatim testimony ... without being impressed with the generally superior character of the group here under scrutiny. There seems no doubt from evidence presented elsewhere that some of the group were Communists, but the impressive and inescapable fact is that the only evidence presented by either side points to: (1) outstanding scholarship, (2) superior teaching, (3) absence of indoctrination in the classroom.

In October 1981, more than four decades after the launch of the Rapp-Coudert Committee, the dismissed employees won a small measure of vindication when the City University Board of Trustees passed a resolution expressing "profound regret at the injustice done to former colleagues on the faculty and staff of the university" who were fired or forced to resign for their political affiliations. A reception was held for the surviving victims and their families on December 17, 1981, hosted by City College of New York President Bernard Harleston.

Unpublished documents of the Rapp-Coudert Committee reside at the New York State Archives in Albany. Rapp-Coudert Committee counsel Paul Windels left an oral record of his activities with the committee as part of the Columbia University Oral History Research Project in New York City. Morris Schappes's experiences with the Rapp-Coudert Committee are documented in Schappes's personal papers at the American Jewish Historical Society in New York and the Tamiment Library of New York University. Materials documenting the trials conducted by the Board of Higher Education subsequent to the Rapp-Coudert hearings are held in the Board of Higher Education of the City of New York Academic Freedom Case Files, also at the Tamiment Library, and in the Records of the Board of Higher Education of the City of New York, at the YIVO Institute for Jewish Research. Digitized materials related to City College of New York are accessible via the CUNY Digital History Archive.

== See also ==
- Lusk Committee
- Dies Committee
- HUAC
- Morris Schappes
- Morris U. Cohen
- Jack D. Foner
- Moses Finley
