= American Labor Party =

Former political party (1936–1956)

- Founded: 1936; 90 years ago
- Dissolved: 1956; 70 years ago
- Split from: Socialist Party of America
- Headquarters: New York City, New York, U.S.
- Ideology: Social democracy Progressivism; Laborism
- Political position: Center-left to left-wing
- Colors: Red

The American Labor Party (ALP) was a political party in the United States established in 1936 that was active almost exclusively in the state of New York. The organization was founded by labor leaders and former members of the Socialist Party of America who had established themselves as the Social Democratic Federation (SDF). The party was intended to parallel the role of the British Labour Party, serving as an umbrella organization to unite New York social democrats of the SDF with trade unionists who would otherwise support candidates of the Republican and Democratic parties.

Many ALP members went on to join the Liberal Party of New York (LPNY) and the Progressive Party.

== History ==
=== Establishment ===
On April 1, 1936, Sidney Hillman, John L. Lewis, and other officials of the unions of the American Federation of Labor and the Congress of Industrial Organizations established Labor's Non-Partisan League (LNPL), an organization akin to the modern political action committee, designed to channel money and manpower to the campaigns of Roosevelt and others standing strongly for the declared interests of organized labor.

Meanwhile, the Socialist Party of America suffered an internal struggle between the right-wing Old Guard and the left-wing Militant faction. In May 1936, the Old Guard broke from the party and formed the Social Democratic Federation (SDF), taking The Forward with them. The SDF formed the People's Party in New York.

In his 1944 memoir, Louis Waldman wrote:

Back from Detroit, I was immediately confronted with a problem which involved millions of dollars of property controlled by subsidiaries of the Socialist Party. In New York alone there were such institutions as the Jewish Daily Forward, the leading Jewish newspaper in the world with a circulation running into hundreds of thousands and with reserve funds amounting to millions. There was The New Leader, a weekly newspaper published in English; there was the Rand School of Social Science, which, together with Camp Tamiment, had enormous property value, not to speak of their importance as propaganda and educational instruments. Control of the Forward alone also meant probable control of fraternal and labor organizations such as the Workmen's Circle, with its millions of dollars in property and tens of thousands of members throughout the United States....
After Detroit it was obvious that the militant Socialists controlled the Socialist Party. I saw that all they had to do in order to gain control of the valuable property in New York was to revoke the New York State charter and expel all state organizations controlled by the Social Democrats or the Old Guard. Since there was always a minority of militant Socialists in each of these corporate institutions, these properties involving millions of dollars in property value and cash reserves would quickly fall into the hands of the militants....
All during 1935 and the early part of 1936 my office was converted into a meeting place for the various committees and members of the organizations threatened by the militants. Constitutions and bylaws were modified in such a way as to prevent control falling into the hands of Norman Thomas' super-revolutionists. – Louis Waldman, Labor Lawyer.

Max Zaritsky, a union president, suggested forming a political party from the Labor's Non-Partisan League of the Congress of Industrial Organizations to David Dubinsky and Sidney Hillman. Zaritsky, Hillman, Dubinsky, Luigi Antonini and Isidore Nagler of the International Ladies Garment Workers Union, Louis Hollander of the Amalgamated Clothing Workers of America, Baruch Charney Vladeck and Alexander Kahn of The Forward, and Louis Waldman of the SDF met at the Brevoort Hotel to discuss the plan. The party's name, American Labor Party, was suggested by Nagler. The SDF agreed to join the initiative.

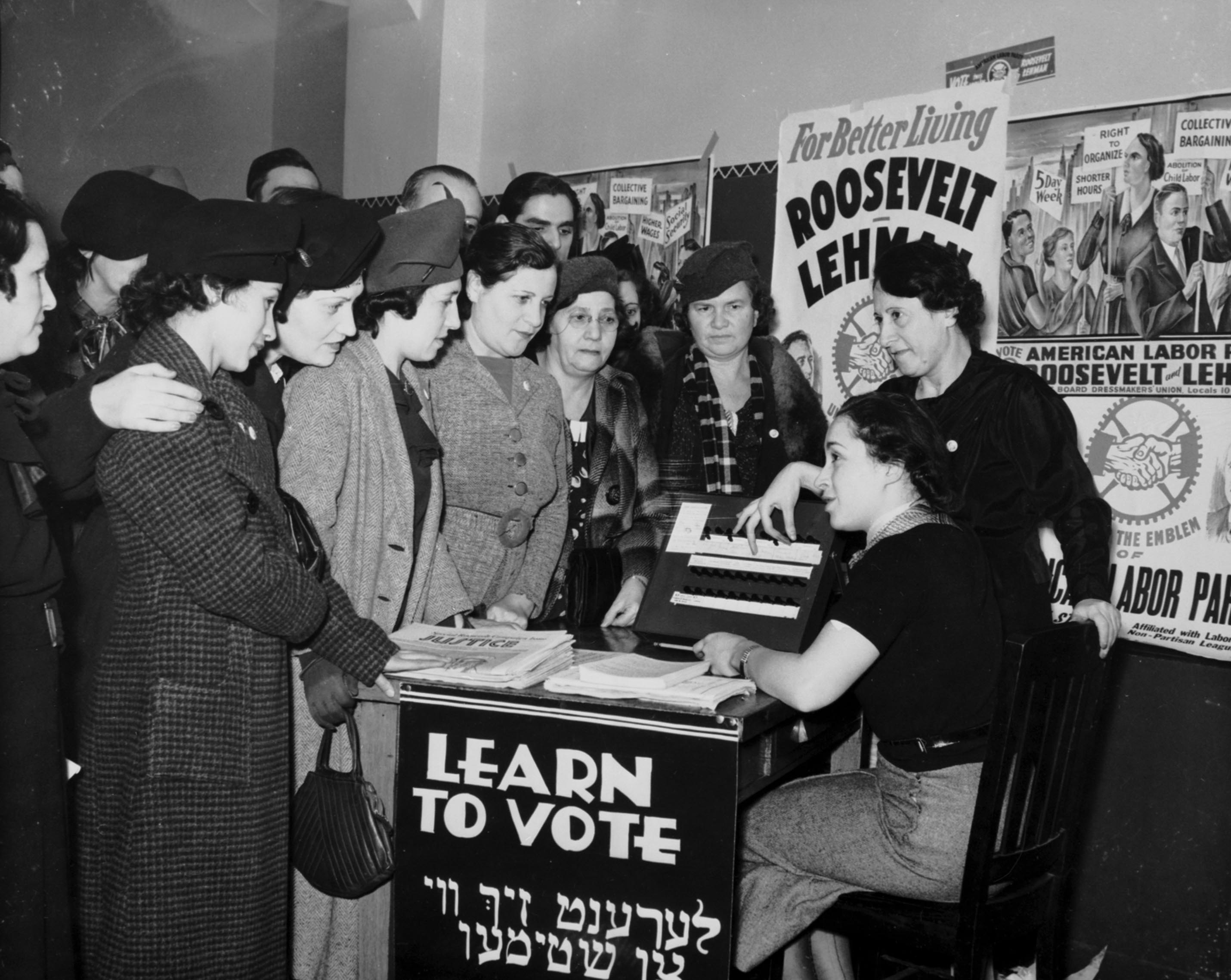
Women surrounded by posters in English and Yiddish supporting Franklin D. Roosevelt, Herbert H. Lehman, and the American Labor Party teach other women how to vote, 1936.

Antonini was the first state chairman of the party, serving from 1936 until 1942. James Farley, chair of the New York State Democratic Committee, and Edward J. Flynn, chair of the DNC, did not support the party, but Franklin D. Roosevelt ordered the Democrats to aid the ALP in collecting enough signatures for party status. During the summer of 1936, the New York state organization of LNPL was transformed into an independent political party in an effort to bolster Roosevelt's electoral chances in the state by gaining him a place on a second candidate ballot line. 274,924 voted for Roosevelt using the ALP's ballot line in the 1936 presidential election, with 238,845 coming from New York City. The largest amount of support came from Jewish areas.

=== Rise and internal struggles ===
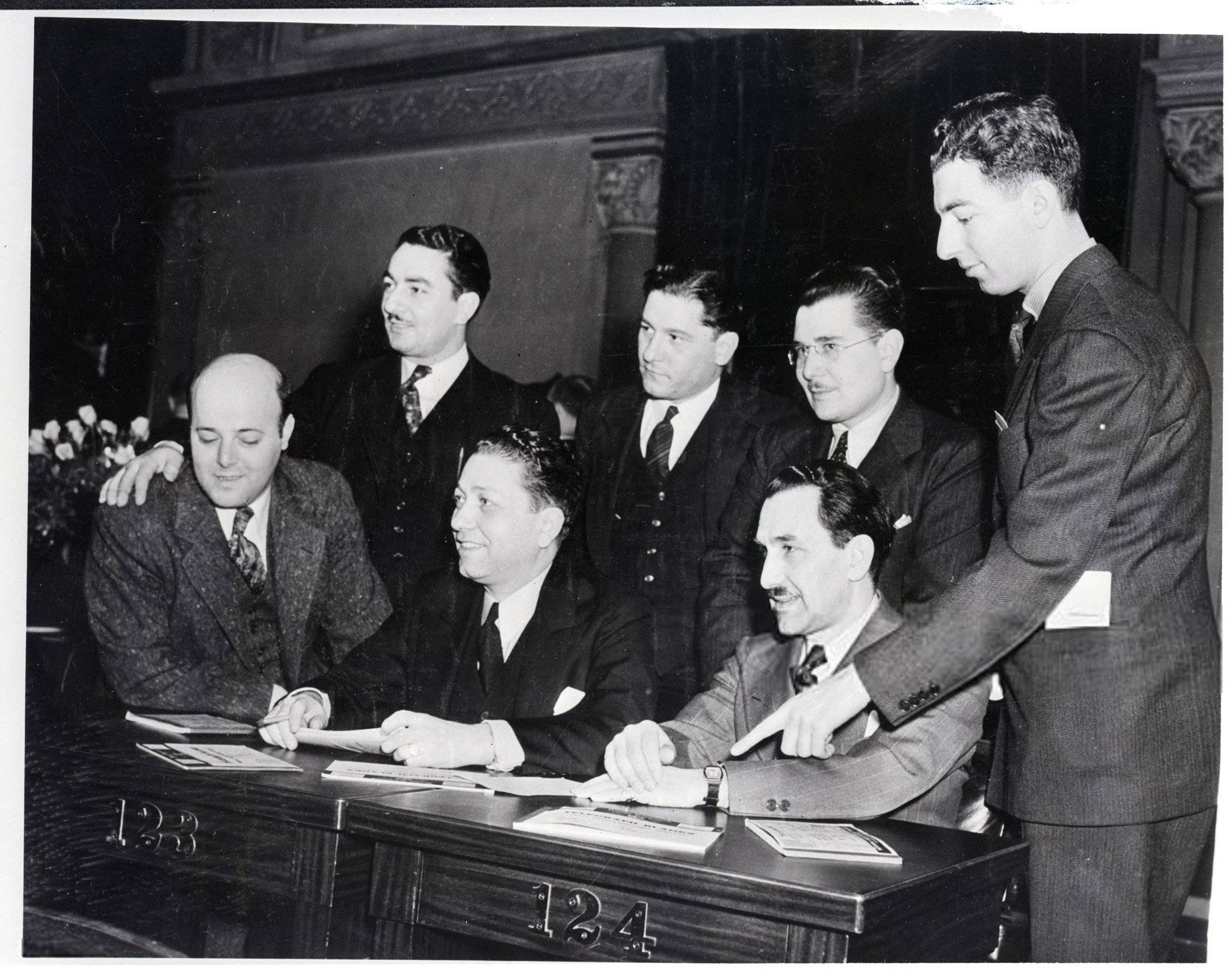
The American Labor Party elected five men to the New York State Assembly in 1937, shown here. Seated (L-R): Frank Monaco, Nathaniel M. Minkoff. Standing: Gerard J. Muccigrosso (leaning on desk), Salvatore T. DeMatteo, Benjamin Brenner, Saul Minkoff, Jr., clerk, and Samuel Puner, official American Labor Party lobbyist.

The organization was largely funded by the needle trade unions of the state. The ALP found itself $50,000 in debt at the end of the 1936 campaign, but substantial contributions from labor groups erased the red ink. The ILGWU itself contributed nearly $142,000 to the 1936 campaign, a relatively huge sum for a third party campaign, given that only $26,000 from all sources had been raised and spent by Norman Thomas' Socialist campaign in the previous presidential election. Over 200 unions were affiliated with the ALP by 1937. Party decision-making in the first year was handled by ILGWU executive secretary Fred Umhey, the Amalgamated Clothing Workers Union's Jacob Potofsky, and Alex Rose of the Milliners'.

The party supported Fiorello La Guardia during the 1937 New York City mayoral election and he received 482,790, 21.6% of the popular vote, on their ballot line. They were the second-largest party in the city and largest in some districts in the Bronx and Brooklyn.

Members of the Communist Party USA started joining the party and Israel Amter, chair of the Communist Party, called for the "building of the American Labor Party". Although its constitution specifically barred Communists from the organization, there was no enforcement for this provision and large numbers flocked to registration as ALP members from the Communist-led United Electrical Workers, Transport Workers, and State, County, and Municipal Workers. Norman Thomas and the Socialists attempted to enter the party in 1937, but faced opposition. Algernon Lee opposed their entrance due to Thomas' pacifism.

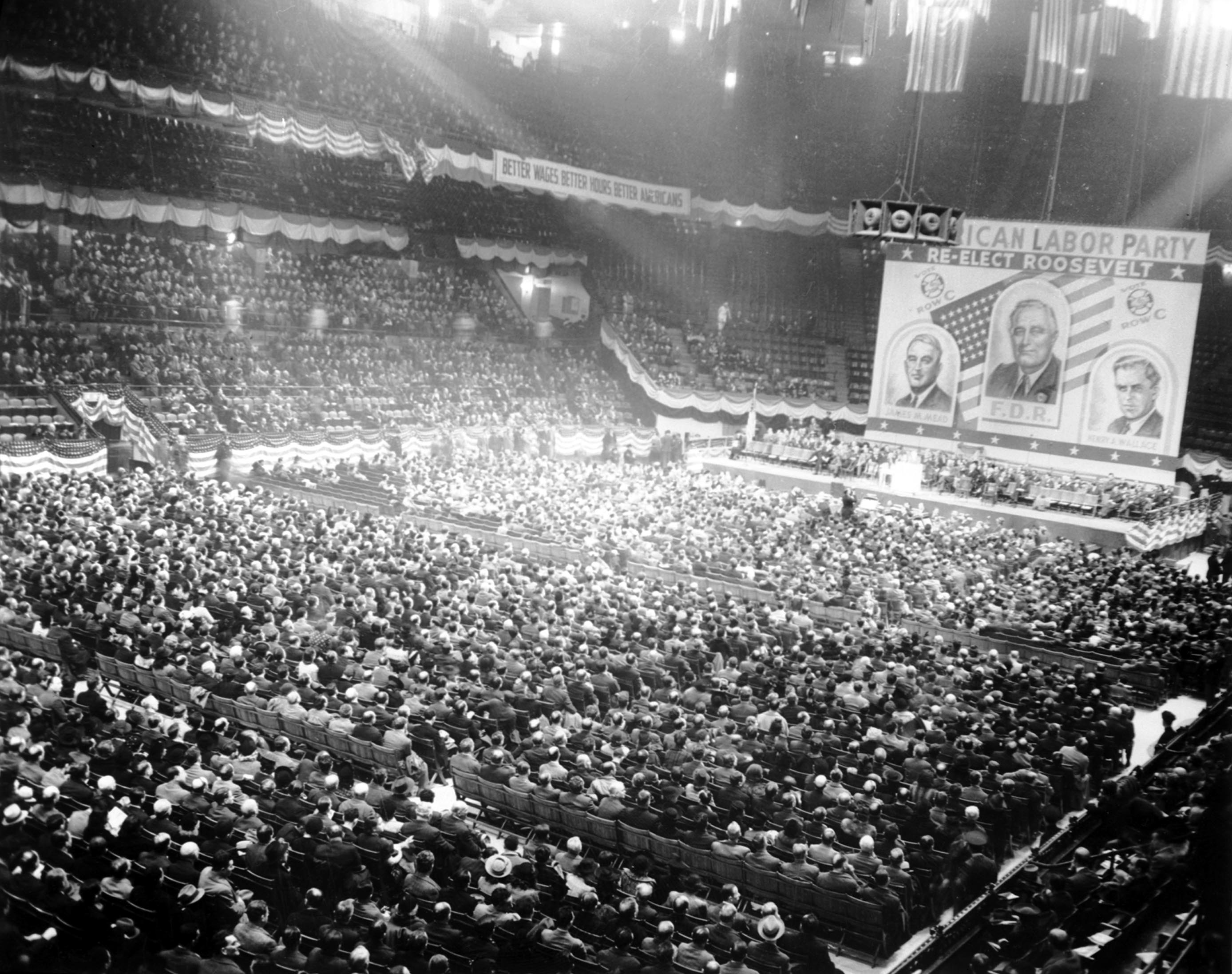
American Labor Party rally to re-elect President Franklin D. Roosevelt, 1940.

Communists in the ALP opposed reelecting Roosevelt in the 1940 presidential election and the party's leadership started an attempt to remove them from the party. The party condemned the Molotov–Ribbentrop Pact. Fights broke out at the party's convention on September 14, 1940, where Roosevelt was given the nomination despite an attempted resolution condemning Roosevelt.

Bundist activists Victor Alter and Henryk Ehrlich were executed by the Soviets. Anti-communists in the ALP condemned their deaths while communists defended the Soviet Union. Vito Marcantonio was also a supporter of the Soviet Union. This debate was one of the major issues in the party's county committee elections in 1943, and the left-wing gained control over the Bronx affiliate.

Hillman, a member of the left-wing, threatened to have the ACWA become involved in the 1944 state committee elections if the party's leadership voted against a proposal to increase union control over the party. The right-wing rejected it. Adolf A. Berle and Eleanor Roosevelt supported the party's right-wing while Franklin Roosevelt wanted to avoid conflict between the factions. La Guardia proposed a compromise in which the state executive committee would be divided between the factions and no communist would be on the election slate. Hillman accepted the proposal, but Dubinsky rejected it. The left-wing won 620 of the 750 committee seats.

The Liberal Party of New York was formed in opposition to the ALP by Paul Blanshard, August Claessens, Harry W. Laidler, and others.

=== Decline ===
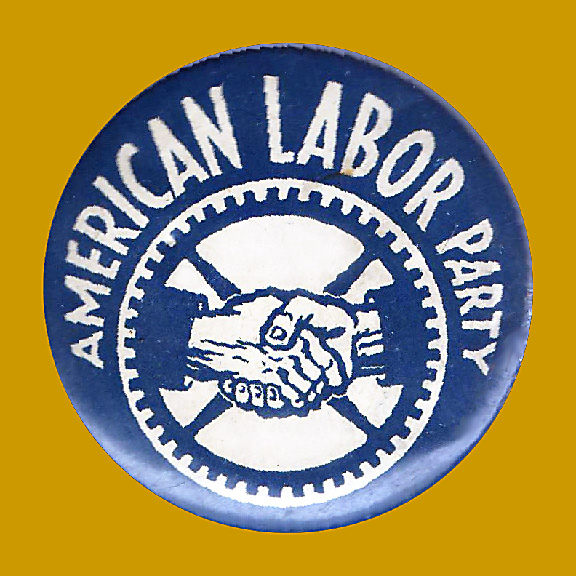
Pinback button issued by the American Labor Party.

The passage of the Wilson Pakula prevented candidates from the ALP from being able to run for the nominations of other parties without the approval of the party's committee. The party lost two state legislators in the 1948 election, but Marcantonio was able to win reelection solely on the American Labor ballot line.

In 1941, American Laborite Joseph V. O'Leary was appointed New York State Comptroller by Governor Herbert H. Lehman both to recognize the ALP's previous and to maintain the party's future support. In 1944 the Congress of Industrial Organization's Greater New York Industrial Union Council, a federation of unions in New York City, formally linked itself to the ALP. The GNYIUC Executive Board "adopted a resolution directing GNYIUC Community Councils, which had been organizing around community issues in neighborhoods throughout the city, to merge into the local ALP clubs," and the "GNYIUC diverted some of its PAC monies directly to the ALP." With this move, the CIO's largest labor federation, consisting of approximately 200 locals and 600,000 members, was formally connected to the ALP. Over the ensuing years, the council would call for local unions to ‘‘Build the American Labor Party, the strongest voice for labor in city and state affairs,’’ and would direct Political Action Stewards in workplaces across the city to ‘‘recruit shop members for active participation in the community activities of the American Labor Party.’’ This support would be instrumental in building the political capacity of the ALP and would ultimately lead to conflicts with the national CIO during the 1948 presidential election.

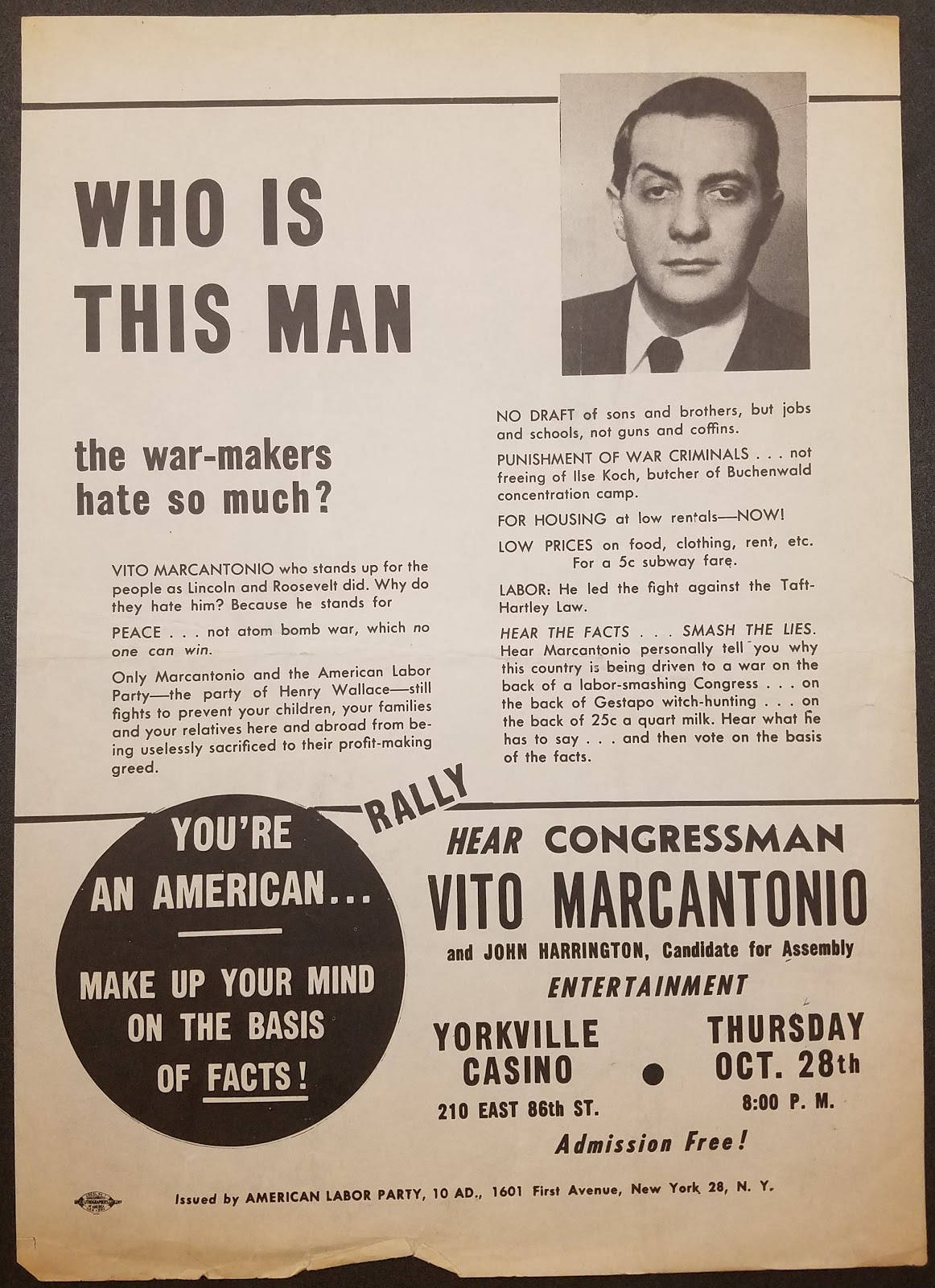
Flyer for an American Labor Party rally featuring Congressman Vito Marcantonio, 1948.

In 1947, several ALP leaders defected. On October 9, 1947, Charles Rubinstein, president of the United Civic Associations of the Bronx, member of the ALP's State executive committee, and former ALP candidate for the City Council left the ALP for no other party, due to "misguided Communist sympathizers" within the ALP. On the same day, George Salvatore, vice chairman of the ALP's Bronx executive committee and former ALP candidate for District Attorney and Supreme Court Justice, left the ALP for the Democratic Party, citing "we are tending to become apologists for Russia's point of view." The next day, October 10, 1947, Eugene Huber resigned as executive secretary of the ALP's Bayside area to join the Liberal Party of New York State because, Huber said, he had found "affixed a stranglehold by the Communist party upon the ALP which has in consequence become a mere envelope for Communist policies and candidates."

The ALP endorsed Henry A. Wallace's position on the Soviet Union after he was dismissed from President Harry S. Truman's cabinet. Vito Marcantonio supported giving the party's presidential ballot line to Wallace while Jacob Potofsky opposed it and left the party in protest. Wallace previously rejected third-party politics at a speech before the ALP on May 25, 1946, when he stated that "because of the election laws in any states, it would give a reactionary victory by dividing the votes of the progressives". The CIO called for all of its ALP-affiliated unions to disaffiliate and ACWA withdrew its support of the ALP after the party endorsed Wallace for president. Mike Quill, president of the Transport Workers Union of America, broke away from the party stating that "the screwballs and crackpots who will continue to carry on as if the Communist Party and the American Labor Party were the same house with two doors".

In 1948, Tammany Hall formed the United Laborite Party, a paper party, meant to draw votes away from the ALP, but the courts ruled in favor of the ALP and stated that the party violated laws prohibiting similarly named parties.

Marcantonio won a seat again to the United States House of Representatives, representing East Harlem for the ALP, as he had done in 1938, 1940, 1942, 1944, and 1946 (but lost in 1950). Marcantonio had been the target of the New York Wilson Pakula Act in 1947 aimed at restricting candidates from one party running in another party's primary election (electoral fusion). Leo Isacson was elected in early 1948 to fill a vacancy in a Bronx district but lost in the general election in November. The Communist Party USA openly endorsed the Progressive Party; some ALP candidates that year were known or alleged communists, e.g., Lee Pressman. Candidates included (winners bolded):

- United States House of Representatives: Marjorie Viemeister (1st District), Richard T. Mayes (2nd District) Herbert A. Shingler (3rd District), Thomas J. McCabe (4th District), Morris Pottish (5th District), Irma Lindheim (6th District), **Joseph L. Pfeifer** (Democrat + ALP) (8th District), Murray Rosof (9th District), Ada B. Jackson (10th District), Frank Serri (11th District), Vincent J. Longhi (12th District), James Griesi (13th District), Lee Pressman (14th District), **Emanuel Celler** (Democrat + ALP) (15th District), Frank Cremonesi (16th District), Alvin Udell (17th District), **Vito Marcantonio** (18th District), **Arthur G. Klein** (Democrat + ALP) (19th District), Annette T. Rubinstein (20th District), Paul O'Dwyer (Democrat ALP) (21st District), **Adam Clayton Powell Jr.** (Democrat + ALP) (22nd District), Leon Straus (23rd District), Leo Isacson (24th District), Albert E. Kahn (25th District), Nicholas Carnes (26th District), Francis X. Nulty (27th District), Pasquale Barile (28th District), Harold M. Chown (29th District), Robert R. Decormier (Democrat + ALP) (30th District), Andrew Peterson (31st District), Margaret L. Wheeler (32nd District), Rockwell Kent (33rd District), Raymond K. Bull (34th District), Max Meyers (35th District), Sidney H. Greenberg (36th District), John Muschock (37th District), Harold Slingerland (39th District), Helen M. Lopez (41st District), Emmanuel Fried (42nd District), George W. Provost (43rd District), Robert Williams (44th District), and Lewis King (45th District).
- New York State Senate: Francis W. Frazier (1st District), Doris Koppelman (2nd District) John S. Fells (3rd District) Gabriel Kopperl (4th District) Donald H. Smith (5th District) Paul Melone (6th District) John Profeta (7th District) Leroy P. Peterson (8th District) Kenneth Sherbell (10th District) Robert Lund (13th District) Helen I. Phillips (15th District) James Malloy (23rd District) Sol Salz (25th District) Charles Hendley (28th District) S. Fels Hecht (31st District) Sidney H. Greenberg (36th District) Max Meyers (35th District) George La Fortune (36th District) Willard Ryker (42nd District) George W. Provost (43rd District) William Murphy (44th District) and Harry Bailey (51st District).
- New York State Supreme Court: Hyman N. Glickstein (1st District), Joseph J. Porte (2nd District), Paul L. Ross (1st District), Charles Rothenberg (2nd District), Robert V. Santangelo (1st District), Max Torchin (2nd District) and Abraham Wittman (8th District).

In 1949, Marcantonio was the ALP nominee for mayor of New York City, marking the first time they fielded an independent candidate for the office. Although he received endorsements from former vice president Henry A. Wallace and singer Paul Robeson, Marcantonio came in third place with 14% of the vote.

=== Demise ===
The party lost its ballot access after John T. McManus, their 1954 gubernatorial candidate, received less than 50,000 votes. Marcantonio criticized communists for being the reason behind the party's poor performance. He claimed that the party's poor performance was due to their poor performance in the 1953 New York City mayoral election. He claimed that communists sabotaged the mayoral campaign by implying that they approved voting for the Liberal candidate.

Marcantonio lost reelection in the 1950 election. He resigned as chair and left the party in November 1953, due to disputes with Communist leaders who he claimed were no longer interested in third-party politics. The party dissolved in 1956.

== Members ==
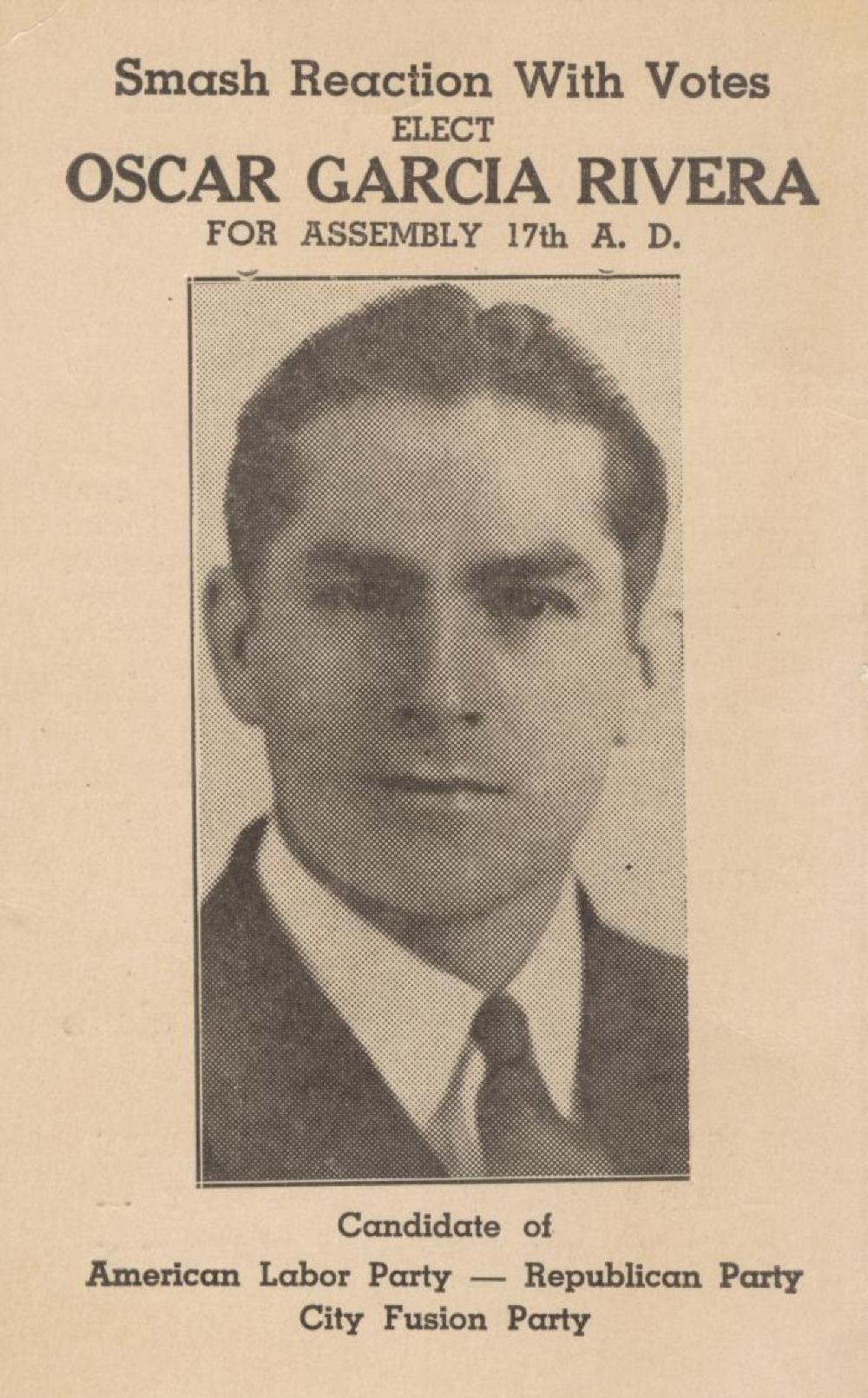
Flyer promoting the candidacy of Oscar García Rivera for State Assembly in 1937. Garcia Rivera became the first Puerto Rican to be elected to public office in the continental United States.

=== Co-founders ===
- Luigi Antonini, First Vice President of the ILGWU
- George L. Berry, President of the IPPU
- Heywood Broun, President of the ANG
- David Dubinsky, President of the ILGWU
- Elinore Morehouse Herrick, labor-relations specialist
- Sidney Hillman, President of the ACWA
- Louis Hollander, Vice President of the ACWA
- Alexander Kahn, Vice President of the Forward Association, candidate for Attorney General of New York (1942)
- John L. Lewis, President of the UMW
- George Meany, President of the New York State AFL
- Isidore Nagler, Vice President of the ILGWU, candidate for U.S. Representative (1938)
- Jacob Potofsky, Assistant President of the ACWA
- Alex Rose, Vice President of the UHCMW
- Rose Schneiderman, labor organizer
- Baruch Charney Vladeck, General Manager of The Forward, New York City Alderman (1918–21)
- Louis Waldman, Chairman of the SDF, New York Assemblyman (1918, 1920)
- Max Zaritsky, President of the UHCMW
- Charles S. Zimmerman, Vice President of the ILGWU

=== Officeholders ===
==== Federal ====
- Leo Isacson, New York Assemblyman (1945–46), U.S. Representative, (1948–49)
- Vito Marcantonio, U.S. Representative (1935–37, 1939–51)

==== State ====
- Benjamin Brenner, New York Assemblyman (1938), Justice of the New York Supreme Court (1953–69)
- Salvatore T. DeMatteo, New York Assemblyman (1938), Justice of the New York Supreme Court (1974–81)
- Samuel Kaplan, New York Assemblyman (1947–48)
- Nathaniel M. Minkoff, New York Assemblyman (1938)
- Frank Monaco, New York Assemblyman (1938)
- Gerard J. Muccigrosso, New York Assemblyman (1938)
- Joseph V. O'Leary, Comptroller of New York (1941–42)
- Oscar García Rivera, New York Assemblyman (1938–40), first Puerto Rican officeholder in the continental United States
- Kenneth Sherbell, New York State Senator (1947–48)
- J. Eugene Zimmer, New York Assemblyman (1941–44)

==== Local ====
- Andrew R. Armstrong, New York City Councilman (1938–39), candidate for Brooklyn Borough President (1940)
- George Backer, New York City Councilman (1938–39)
- Charles Belous, New York City Councilman (1938–41)
- Eugene P. Connolly, New York City Councilman (1946–49)
- Louis P. Goldberg, New York City Councilman (1942–43, 1946–49)
- Louis Hollander, New York City Councilman (1938–39)
- Gertrude W. Klein, New York City Councilwoman (1942–45)
- Fiorello La Guardia, Mayor of New York City (1934–46)
- Harry W. Laidler, New York City Councilman (1940–41)
- Salvatore Ninfo, New York City Councilman (1938–43)
- Langdon W. Post, Chairman of the New York City Housing Authority (1934–37), New York Assemblyman (1929–32), candidate for New York City Councilman (1939)
- Adam Clayton Powell Jr., New York City Councilman (1942–43), U.S. Representative (1945–71), first black New York City Councilman and first black U.S. Representative from New York
- Mike Quill, New York City Councilman (1938–39, 1944–49)
- Baruch Charney Vladeck, New York City Councilman (1938)

=== Candidates ===
- John Abt, candidate for Associate Judge of the New York Court of Appeals (1946)
- Dean Alfange, candidate for Governor of New York (1942), Chairman of the New York State Quarter Horse Racing Commission (1970–75)
- Jack Altman, candidate for U.S. Representative (1940)
- Joseph C. Baldwin, candidate for U.S. Representative (1946), U.S. Representative (1941–47), New York State Senator (1935–36) (elected as a Democrat)
- Dorothy Jacobs Bellanca, candidate for U.S. Representative (1938)
- Louis E. Burnham, candidate for New York Assemblyman (1940)
- W. E. B. Du Bois, candidate for U.S. Senator (1950)
- William F. Brunner, candidate for U.S. Representative (1942), Sheriff of Queens County (1935–36), U.S. Representative (1929–35), New York Assemblyman (1922–28) (elected as a Democrat)
- August Claessens, candidate for New York State Senator (1940), New York Assemblyman (1918–1920, 1922)
- George Counts, candidate for New York City Councilman (1943)
- Frank Crosswaith, candidate for New York City Councilman (1939)
- Joseph Curran, candidate for U.S. Representative (1940)
- Benjamin J. Davis Jr., candidate for New York City Councilman (1949)
- Bella Dodd, candidate for New York Assemblywoman (1938)
- Ralph Fasanella, candidate for New York City Councilman (1949)
- Howard Fast, candidate for U.S. Representative (1952)
- Abraham Feller, candidate for New York Assemblyman (1938), General Counsel of the United Nations (1946–52)
- Emanuel Fried, candidate for U.S. Representative (1948)
- Si Gerson, candidate for New York City Councilman (1948)
- Frances Goldin, candidate for New York State Senator (1950)
- Ira Gollobin, candidate for Justice of the New York Supreme Court (1954)
- Ewart Guinier, candidate for Manhattan Borough President (1949)
- Charles J. Hendley, candidate for New York State Senator (1948)
- Minneola Ingersoll, candidate for U.S. Representative (1949)
- Albert E. Kahn, candidate for U.S. Representative (1948)
- William Karlin, candidate for New York City Municipal Court Judge (1937)
- Maida Springer Kemp, candidate for New York Assemblywoman (1942)
- Rockwell Kent, candidate for U.S. Representative (1948)
- Corliss Lamont, candidate for U.S. Senator (1952)
- Ray Lev, candidate for New York City Councilwoman (1949)
- Matthew M. Levy, candidate for Bronx Borough President (1941), Justice of the New York Supreme Court (1951–71)
- Irma Lindheim, candidate for U.S. Representative (1948)
- William Mandel, candidate for U.S. Representative (1950, 1952)
- Clifford T. McAvoy, candidate for Mayor of New York City (1953)
- John T. McManus, candidate for Governor of New York (1950, 1954)
- Herbert M. Merrill, candidate for U.S. Representative (1942), New York Assemblyman (1912)
- Karen Morley, candidate for Lieutenant Governor of New York (1954)
- Hugh Mulzac, candidate for Queens Borough President (1951)
- John F. O'Donnell, candidate for New York Assemblyman (1938)
- Samuel Orr, candidate for U.S. Representative (1938)
- Shaemas O'Sheel, candidate for U.S. Representative (1940)
- Ira J. Palestin, candidate for City Judge (1943), New York City Councilman (1946–49) (elected as a Liberal)
- Jacob Panken, candidate for Justice of the New York Supreme Court (1939)
- Lee Pressman, candidate for U.S. Representative (1948)
- Victor Rabinowitz, candidate for U.S. Representative (1947)
- Wellington Roe, candidate for U.S. Representative (1940)
- O. John Rogge, candidate for Surrogate of New York County (1948)
- Annette Rubinstein, candidate for U.S. Representative (1948)
- Joseph Schlossberg, candidate for U.S. Representative (1938)
- Charles Solomon, candidate for Kings County District Attorney (1939), New York Assemblyman (1919–1920)
- Johannes Steele, candidate for U.S. Representative (1946)
- Mary van Kleeck, candidate for New York State Senator (1948)
- Joseph A. Weil, candidate for U.S. Representative (1942)
- Pearl Willen, candidate for New York City Councilwoman (1943)
- Max Yergan, candidate for New York City Councilman (1941)

== Election results ==
=== Federal Offices ===
U.S. President
Election	Nominee	Running-mate	Fusion	Votes		
Election	Nominee	Running-mate	Fusion	No.	Share	Place
1936	Franklin D. Roosevelt	John N. Garner	Democratic	274,924	4.91 / 100	Won
1940	Franklin D. Roosevelt	Henry A. Wallace	Democratic	417,418	6.62 / 100	Won
1944	Franklin D. Roosevelt	Harry S. Truman	Democratic	496,405	7.86 / 100	Won
1948	Henry A. Wallace	Glen H. Taylor	American-Labor	509,559	8.25 / 100	3rd
1952	Vincent Hallinan	Charlotta Bass	American-Labor	64,211	0.90 / 100	3rd

U.S. Senator
Election	Class	Nominee	Fusion	Votes			Seats (Party and Endorsed)	
Election	Class	Nominee	Fusion	No.	Share	Place	Seats (Party and Endorsed)	
1936	No seat up						0 / 2	Steady
1938	III	Robert F. Wagner	Democratic	398,110	8.69 / 100	Re-elected	2 / 2	▲2
1938	I (Special)	James M. Mead	Democratic	378,028	8.31 / 100	Elected	2 / 2	▲2
1940	I	James M. Mead	Democratic	381,359	6.21 / 100	Re-elected	2 / 2	Steady
1942	No seat up						2 / 2	Steady
1944	III	Robert F. Wagner	Democratic	483,785	7.54 / 100	Re-elected	2 / 2	Steady
1946	I	Herbert H. Lehman	Democratic	435,846	8.64 / 100	2nd	1 / 2	▼1
1948	No seat up						1 / 2	Steady
1950	III	Herbert H. Lehman	American Labor	205,729	3.76 / 100	3rd	0 / 2	▼1
1952	III	Corliss Lamont	American Labor	104,702	1.50 / 100	3rd	0 / 2	Steady
1954	No seat up						0 / 2	Steady

Year	Candidate	Chamber	State	District	Votes	%	Result	Notes	Ref
1937	George Backer	House	New York	17	9,325	13.98%	Lost		
1938	Bernard Kleban	House	New York	3	4,898	11.20%	Lost		
1938	Joseph Dermody	House	New York	5	8,352	10.73%	Lost		
1938	Bernard Reswick	House	New York	7	9,734	19.45%	Lost		
1938	Spencer K. Binyon	House	New York	9	12,199	10.98%	Lost		
1938	John V. Murphy	House	New York	11	4,527	6.60%	Lost		
1938	Eugene P. Connolly	House	New York	13	3,541	16.96%	Lost		
1938	Daniel L. McDonough	House	New York	15	3,103	9.39%	Lost		
1938	George Backer	House	New York	17	6,120	8.33%	Lost		
1938	Martin C. Kyne	House	New York	18	3,440	8.10%	Lost		
1938	Joseph Schlossberg	House	New York	19	15,033	18.58%	Lost		
1938	Vito Marcantonio	House	New York	20	18,960	59.74%	Won	Also won Republican primary	
1938	Thomas C. O'Leary	House	New York	22	6,141	11.61%	Lost		
1938	Isidore Nagler	House	New York	23	67,273	28.39%	Lost		
1938	Bartholomew F. Murphy	House	New York	24	40,931	17.08%	Lost		
1938	Charles P. Russell	House	New York	36	19,020	21.50%	Lost		
1938	Edward J. Wagner	House	New York	39	5,460	5.48%	Lost		
1940	Matthew Napear	House	New York	2	20,827	5.08%	Lost		
1940	Michael Giaratano	House	New York	4	3,636	5.52%	Lost		
1940	Irving B. Altman	House	New York	6	31,945	14.13%	Lost		
1940	Benjamin Brenner	House	New York	8	52,972	13.83%	Lost		
1940	Wellington Roe	House	New York	11	5,193	5.50%	Lost		
1940	Bernard Harkavey	House	New York	12	3,664	15.39%	Lost		
1940	Geno Bardi	House	New York	13	2,534	8.67%	Lost		
1940	Samuel Burt	House	New York	14	6,103	13.13%	Lost		
1940	Joseph Curran	House	New York	15	4,623	10.48%	Lost		
1940	Thomas Darcey	House	New York	16	3,874	6.08%	Lost		
1940	Morris Watson	House	New York	17	5,625	5.39%	Lost		
1940	Shaemas O'Sheel	House	New York	18	3,612	6.11%	Lost		
1940	Benjamin M. Zelman	House	New York	19	9,209	8.15%	Lost		
1940	Vito Marcantonio	House	New York	20	25,254	62.49%	Won	Also won Republican primary	
1940	Alfred K. Stern	House	New York	21	16,529	9.67%	Lost		
1940	Frank Crosswaith	House	New York	22	5,931	8.04%	Lost		
1940	Jack Altman	House	New York	23	50,293	14.91%	Lost		
1940	George Thomas	House	New York	24	35,233	10.39%	Lost		
1941	Eugene P. Connolly	House	New York	17	3,985	9.07%	Lost		
1941	Leonard H. Wacker	House	New York	14	714	5.64%	Lost		
1942	William F. Brunner	House	New York	2	28,224	11.36%	Lost		
1942	Joseph A. Weil	House	New York	3	3,693	11.77%	Lost		
1942	Matthew P. Coleman	House	New York	4	2,370	6.99%	Lost		
1942	Albert Slade	House	New York	9	10,957	11.35%	Lost		
1942	John Rogan	House	New York	15	2,798	11.14%	Lost		
1942	Vito Marcantonio	House	New York	20	18,924	100.00%	Won	Ran unopposed	
1942	Nelson M. Fuller	House	New York	43	3,466	5.09%	Lost		
1944	Jacob A. Salzman	House	New York	9	16,521	14.44%	Lost		
1944	James V. King	House	New York	14	28,766	19.61%	Lost		
1944	Seon Felshin	House	New York	17	12,278	8.34%	Lost		
1944	Vito Marcantonio	House	New York	18	82,316	100.00%	Won	Ran unopposed	
1946	Johannes Steele	House	New York	19	13,415	38.23%	Lost		
1946	George H. Rooney	House	New York	4	7,439	6.93%	Lost		
1946	Anthony Scimeca	House	New York	9	16,359	19.26%	Lost		
1946	Joseph C. Baldwin	House	New York	17	9,527	8.30%	Lost		
1946	Vito Marcantonio	House	New York	18	42,229	54.19%	Won	Also won Democratic primary	
1946	Eugene P. Connolly	House	New York	21	14,359	14.09%	Lost		
1946	David A. Schlossberg	House	New York	23	25,229	20.82%	Lost		
1946	Roy Soden	House	New York	24	24,249	27.25%	Lost		
1946	Edward V. Morand	House	New York	25	25,353	17.49%	Lost		
1946	Gerald O'Reilly	House	New York	26	17,379	13.20%	Lost		
1947	Victor Rabinowitz	House	New York	14	20,800	25.29%	Lost		
1948	Leo Isacson	House	New York	24	22,697	55.88%	Won		
1948	Thomas J. McCabe	House	New York	4	7,681	5.79%	Lost		
1948	Morris Pottish	House	New York	5	11,994	7.17%	Lost		
1948	Irma Lindheim	House	New York	6	9,092	5.99%	Lost		
1948	Murray Rosof	House	New York	9	19,803	18.64%	Lost		
1948	Ada B. Jackson	House	New York	10	22,067	17.82%	Lost		
1948	Frank Serri	House	New York	11	20,340	14.89%	Lost		
1948	Vincent J. Longhi	House	New York	12	6,968	7.65%	Lost		
1948	James Griesi	House	New York	13	14,440	11.53%	Lost		
1948	Lee Pressman	House	New York	14	29,502	22.15%	Lost		
1948	Frank Cremonesi	House	New York	16	6,991	6.74%	Lost		
1948	Alvin Udell	House	New York	17	13,401	9.57%	Lost		
1948	Vito Marcantonio	House	New York	18	36,278	36.87%	Won		
1948	Eugene P. Connolly	House	New York	20	15,727	12.64%	Lost		
1948	Leon Straus	House	New York	23	24,903	17.01%	Lost		
1948	Leo Isacson	House	New York	24	43,933	36.95%	Lost		
1948	Albert E. Kahn	House	New York	25	30,112	17.84%	Lost		
1948	Nicholas Carnes	House	New York	26	18,379	11.01%	Lost		
1949	Minneola Ingersoll	House	New York	7	2,712	6.48%	Lost		
1949	Annette Rubinstein	House	New York	20	5,348	6.64%	Lost		

== See also ==
- Liberal Party of New York
- National Progressives of America (1938–1946)
- Progressive Party (United States, 1948–1955)

== Works cited ==
- Johnpoll, Bernard (1986). Biographical Dictionary of the American Left. Cornell University Press. ISBN 0313242003.
- Schmidt, Karl (1960). Henry A. Wallace: Quixotic Crusade 1948. Syracuse University Press.
- Soyer, Daniel (2021). Left in the Center: The Liberal Party of New York and the Rise and Fall of American Social Democracy. Cornell University Press. ISBN 9781501759888. JSTOR 10.7591/j.ctv1hw3x50.2.
