= Lawrence Murray =

Lawrence Murray may refer to:

- Lawrence O. Murray, United States Comptroller of the Currency, 1908–1913
- Lawrence J. Murray Jr. (1910–2000), American lawyer and politician from New York
