= Willen (disambiguation) =

Willen may refer to:

== People ==
- Bob Willen, American company chairman
- Drenka Willen (born 1929), Serbian-American editor, publisher and translator
- Paul Willen (1928–2022), American architect
- Pearl Willen (1904–1968), American activist
- Willen (footballer) (born 1992), Brazilian footballer

== Places ==
- Willen, a suburb of Milton Keynes, England
  - Willen Lake, a lake and park adjoining the suburb
- Willen, Manitoba, a community in Canada

== See also ==
- Willens
