= 1949 United States House of Representatives elections =

There were five special elections to the United States House of Representatives in 1949, during the 81st United States Congress.

== List of elections ==
District	Incumbent			This race	
District	Member	Party	First elected	Results	Candidates
New York 7	John J. Delaney	Democratic	1918 (special)	Incumbent died November 18, 1948, during previous congress. New member elected February 15, 1949. Democratic hold.	▌ ✓ Louis B. Heller (Democratic) 54.8%; ▌Francis E. Dorn (Republican) 38.7%; ▌Minneola Ingersoll (American Labor) 6.5%
New York 20	Sol Bloom	Democratic	1923 (special)	Incumbent died March 7, 1949. New member elected May 17, 1949. Liberal gain.	▌ ✓ Franklin D. Roosevelt Jr. (Liberal) 50.7%; ▌Benjamin Shalleck (Democratic) 30.2%; ▌William H. McIntyre (Republican) 12.5%; ▌Annette Rubinstein (American Labor) 6.6%
Pennsylvania 26	Robert L. Coffey	Democratic	1948	Incumbent died April 20, 1949. New member elected September 13, 1949. Republican gain.	▌ ✓ John P. Saylor (Republican) 53.8%; ▌Curry E. Coffey (Democratic) 46.2%
California 5	Richard J. Welch	Republican	1926 (special)	Incumbent died September 10, 1949. New member elected November 8, 1949. Democratic gain.	▌ ✓ John F. Shelley (Democratic) 55.5%; ▌Lloyd J. Cosgrove (Republican) 37.8%; ▌Charles R. Garry (Democratic) 6.7%
New York 10	Andrew L. Somers	Democratic	1924	Incumbent died April 6, 1949. New member elected November 8, 1949. Democratic hold.	▌ ✓ Edna F. Kelly (Democratic) 55.1%; ▌Jules Cohen (Liberal) 27.5%; ▌George H. Fankuchen (Republican) 17.5%

== See also ==
- List of special elections to the United States House of Representatives
