= 161st New York State Legislature =

New York state legislative session

←	160th	162nd	→
- New York State Capitol (2009)

Overview
- Legislative body: New York State Legislature
- Jurisdiction: New York, United States
- Term: January 1 – December 31, 1938

Senate
- Members: 51
- President: Lt. Gov. M. William Bray (D)
- Temporary President: John J. Dunnigan (D)
- Party control: Democratic (29–22)

Assembly
- Members: 150
- Speaker: Oswald D. Heck (R)
- Party control: Republican (84–61–5)

Sessions
- 1st: January 5 – March 19, 1938

The 161st New York State Legislature, consisting of the New York State Senate and the New York State Assembly, met from January 5 to March 19, 1938, during the sixth year of Herbert H. Lehman's governorship, in Albany.

== Background ==
Under the provisions of the New York Constitution of 1894, as re-apportioned in 1917, 51 Senators and 150 assemblymen were elected in single-seat districts; senators served a two-year term, while assemblymen served a one-year term. The senatorial districts consisted either of one or more entire counties; or a contiguous area within a single county. The counties which were divided into more than one senatorial district were New York (nine districts), Kings (eight), Bronx (three), Erie (three), Monroe (two), Queens (two) and Westchester (two). The Assembly districts were made up of contiguous area, all within the same county.

At this time there were two major political parties: the Democratic Party and the Republican Party. The American Labor Party and the Socialist Party also nominated tickets. In New York City, a "Trades Union", an "Anti-Communist", and a "City Fusion" ticket were also nominated.

== Elections ==
The 1937 New York state election was held on November 2. The only statewide elective office up for election was a judgeship on the New York Court of Appeals. The Democratic incumbent, Gov. Herbert H. Lehman's brother Irving Lehman, was re-elected with Republican and American Labor endorsement.

At the same time, an amendment to the State Constitution to increase of the term in office of the members of the New York State Assembly to two years, and of the statewide elected state officers (Governor, Lieutenant Governor, Comptroller, Attorney General) to four years, was accepted. Also, delegates for a Constitutional Convention, to be held later that year after the legislative session, were elected.

Assemblywoman Jane H. Todd (Rep.), of Tarrytown, was re-elected.

== Sessions ==
The Legislature met for the regular session at the State Capitol in Albany on January 5, 1938; and adjourned in the evening of March 19.

Oswald D. Heck (Rep.) was re-elected Speaker, with 83 votes against 55 for Irwin Steingut (Dem.) and 4 for Nathaniel M. Minkoff (Am. Labor).

The Constitutional Convention met at the State Capitol in Albany on April 5; and adjourned on August 26.

== State Senate ==
=== Districts ===
- 1st District: Nassau and Suffolk counties
- 2nd and 3rd District: Parts of Queens County, i.e. the Borough of Queens
- 4th, 5th, 6th, 7th, 8th, 9th, 10th and 11th District: Parts of Kings County, i.e. the Borough of Brooklyn
- 12th, 13th, 14th, 15th, 16th, 17th, 18th, 19th and 20th District: Parts of New York County, i.e. the Borough of Manhattan
- 21st, 22nd and 23rd District: Parts of Bronx County, i.e. the Borough of the Bronx
- 24th District: Richmond County, i.e. the Borough of Richmond (now the Borough of Staten Island), and Rockland County
- 25th District: Part of Westchester County
- 26th District: Cortlandt, Greenburgh, Mount Pleasant, Ossining and part of Yonkers; in Westchester County
- 27th District: Orange and Sullivan counties
- 28th District: Columbia, Dutchess and Putnam counties
- 29th District: Delaware, Greene and Ulster counties
- 30th District: Albany County
- 31st District: Rensselaer County
- 32nd District: Saratoga and Schenectady counties
- 33rd District: Clinton, Essex, Warren and Washington counties
- 34th District: Franklin and St. Lawrence counties
- 35th District: Fulton, Hamilton, Herkimer and Lewis counties
- 36th District: Oneida County
- 37th District: Jefferson and Oswego counties
- 38th District: Onondaga County
- 39th District: Madison, Montgomery, Otsego and Schoharie counties
- 40th District: Broome, Chenango and Cortland counties
- 41st District: Chemung, Schuyler, Tioga and Tompkins counties
- 42nd District: Cayuga, Seneca and Wayne counties
- 43rd District: Ontario, Steuben and Yates counties
- 44th District: Allegany, Genesee, Livingston and Wyoming
- 45th and 46th District: Monroe County
- 47th District: Niagara and Orleans counties
- 48th, 49th and 50th District: Erie County
- 51st District: Cattaraugus and Chautauqua counties

=== Members ===
The asterisk (*) denotes members of the previous Legislature who continued in office as members of this Legislature.

Note: For brevity, the chairmanships omit the words "...the Committee on (the)..."

District	Senator	Party	Notes
1st	George L. Thompson*	Republican	
2nd	Joseph D. Nunan Jr.*	Democrat	also a delegate to the Constitutional Convention
3rd	Peter T. Farrell*	Democrat	
4th	Philip M. Kleinfeld*	Democrat	also a delegate to the Constitutional Convention
5th	John J. Howard*	Democrat	
6th	Edward J. Coughlin*	Democrat	
7th	Jacob J. Schwartzwald*	Democrat	
8th	Joseph A. Esquirol*	Democrat	
9th	Jacob H. Livingston*	Democrat	also a delegate to the Constitutional Convention; on November 8, 1938, elected to the City Court (Brooklyn)
10th	Jeremiah F. Twomey*	Democrat	Chairman of Finance
11th	James J. Crawford*	Democrat	
12th	Elmer F. Quinn*	Democrat	
13th	Thomas F. Burchill*	Democrat	
14th	William J. Murray*	Democrat	
15th	John L. Buckley*	Democrat	
16th	John J. McNaboe*	Democrat	
17th	Leon A. Fischel*	Democrat	
18th	John T. McCall*	Democrat	also a delegate to the Constitutional Convention
19th	Duncan T. O'Brien*	Democrat	died on September 14, 1938
20th	A. Spencer Feld*	Democrat	Chairman of Public Education
21st	Lazarus Joseph*	Democrat	
22nd	Julius S. Berg*	Democrat	committed suicide on July 20, 1938
23rd	John J. Dunnigan*	Democrat	Temporary President; also a delegate to the Constitutional Convention
24th	Rae L. Egbert*	Democrat	
25th	Pliny W. Williamson*	Republican	
26th	James A. Garrity*	Dem./Am. L.	
27th	Thomas C. Desmond*	Republican	
28th	Frederic H. Bontecou*	Republican	also a delegate to the Constitutional Convention
29th	Arthur H. Wicks*	Republican	
30th	Erastus Corning 2nd*	Democrat	
31st	Clifford C. Hastings*	Republican	
32nd	Edwin E. Miller*	Republican	
33rd	Benjamin F. Feinberg*	Republican	also a delegate to the Constitutional Convention
34th	Rhoda Fox Graves*	Republican	
35th	Harry F. Dunkel*	Republican	
36th	William H. Hampton*	Republican	
37th	Perley A. Pitcher*	Republican	Minority Leader; also a delegate to the Constitutional Convention
38th	Francis L. McElroy*	Dem./Am. L.	
39th	Walter W. Stokes*	Republican	
40th	Roy M. Page*	Republican	
41st	C. Tracey Stagg*	Republican	
42nd	Charles J. Hewitt*	Republican	
43rd	Earle S. Warner*	Republican	
44th	Joe R. Hanley*	Republican	
45th	Emmett L. Doyle*	Dem./Am. L.	
46th	George F. Rogers*	Dem./Am. L.	
47th	William H. Lee*	Republican	
48th	Walter J. Mahoney*	Republican	
49th	Stephen J. Wojtkowiak*	Dem./Am. L.	
50th	Nelson W. Cheney*	Republican	
51st	Leigh G. Kirkland*	Republican	

=== Employees ===
- Clerk: James J. Reilly
- Sergeant-at-Arms: William F. Egloff Jr.
- Stenographer: Robert Murray

== State Assembly ==
=== Assemblymen ===
Note: For brevity, the chairmanships omit the words "...the Committee on (the)..."

District		Assemblymen	Party	Notes
Albany	1st	George W. Foy*	Democrat	
Albany	2nd	John P. Hayes*	Democrat	
Albany	3rd	James J. Carroll	Dem./Am. L.	
Allegany		William H. MacKenzie*	Republican	
Bronx	1st	Matthew J. H. McLaughlin*	Dem./T.U./A.-C.	
Bronx	2nd	Patrick J. Fogarty	Dem./T.U./A.-C.	
Bronx	3rd	Carl Pack*	Dem./T.U./A.-C.	
Bronx	4th	Isidore Dollinger*	Dem./T.U./A.-C.	
Bronx	5th	Nathaniel M. Minkoff	Am. L./Soc.	American Labor Leader
Bronx	6th	Peter A. Quinn*	Dem./T.U./A.-C.	
Bronx	7th	Gerard J. Muccigrosso	Am. L./Soc./C.F.	
Bronx	8th	John A. Devany Jr.*	Dem./T.U./A.-C.	
Broome	1st	Edward F. Vincent*	Republican	Chairman of Public Institutions
Broome	2nd	James E. Hill*	Republican	
Cattaraugus		James W. Riley*	Rep./Soc.	Chairman of Military Affairs
Cayuga		Andrew D. Burgdorf*	Republican	Chairman of Public Health
Chautauqua	1st	Lloyd J. Babcock*	Republican	Chairman of Pensions
Chautauqua	2nd	Carl E. Darling*	Republican	Chairman of Revision
Chemung		Chauncey B. Hammond*	Republican	Chairman of Penal Institutions
Chenango		Irving M. Ives*	Republican	Majority Leader
Clinton		Emmett J. Roach*	Democrat	
Columbia		Frederick A. Washburn*	Republican	Chairman of Labor and Industries
Cortland		John B. Briggs*	Republican	
Delaware		William T. A. Webb	Republican	
Dutchess	1st	Howard N. Allen*	Republican	Chairman of Agriculture
Dutchess	2nd	Emerson D. Fite*	Republican	Chairman of Charitable and Religious Societies
Erie	1st	Frank A. Gugino*	Republican	
Erie	2nd	Harold B. Ehrlich*	Rep./Am. L.	Chairman of Claims
Erie	3rd	William J. Butler	Rep./Am. L.	
Erie	4th	Anthony J. Canney*	Democrat	also a delegate to the Constitutional Convention
Erie	5th	Frank Kwiatkowski	Dem./Am. L.	
Erie	6th	Jerome C. Kreinheder*	Republican	
Erie	7th	Charles O. Burney Jr.*	Republican	
Erie	8th	R. Foster Piper*	Rep./Soc.	Chairman of Insurance; also a delegate to the Constitutional Convention
Essex		Thomas A. Leahy*	Republican	
Franklin		John H. Black*	Republican	
Fulton and Hamilton		Denton D. Lake*	Republican	Chairman of Aviation
Genesee		Herbert A. Rapp*	Republican	Chairman of Motor Vehicles
Greene		Paul Fromer*	Republican	
Herkimer		Leo A. Lawrence*	Republican	
Jefferson		Russell Wright*	Republican	
Kings	1st	Crawford W. Hawkins*	Dem./T.U./A.-C.	
Kings	2nd	Benjamin Brenner	Am. L./City F.	
Kings	3rd	Michael J. Gillen*	Dem./T.U./A.-C.	
Kings	4th	Bernard Austin*	Democrat	
Kings	5th	Charles R. McConnell*	Democrat	
Kings	6th	Robert J. Crews	Rep./City F.	Chairman of Affairs of the City of New York
Kings	7th	William Kirnan*	Democrat	
Kings	8th	Charles J. Beckinella	Democrat	
Kings	9th	Edgar F. Moran*	Democrat	
Kings	10th	William C. McCreery*	Democrat	
Kings	11th	Bernard J. Moran*	Democrat	
Kings	12th	Edward S. Moran Jr.*	Democrat	on June 24, arrested and accused of taking bribes
Kings	13th	Ralph Schwartz*	Democrat	
Kings	14th	Harry Gittleson	Democrat	
Kings	15th	John Smolenski	Democrat	
Kings	16th	Salvatore T. DeMatteo	Am. Labor	
Kings	17th	Fred G. Moritt	Democrat	
Kings	18th	Irwin Steingut*	Democrat	Minority Leader; also a delegate to the Constitutional Convention
Kings	19th	Max M. Turshen*	Democrat	
Kings	20th	Roy H. Rudd*	Democrat	
Kings	21st	Charles H. Breitbart*	Democrat	
Kings	22nd	Peter H. Ruvolo	Democrat	
Kings	23rd	Frank Monaco	Am. L./Rep.	
Lewis		Fred A. Young*	Republican	
Livingston		James J. Wadsworth*	Republican	Chairman of Public Relief and Welfare
Madison		Wheeler Milmoe*	Republican	Chairman of Public Printing
Monroe	1st	Frank J. Sellmayer Jr.	Republican	
Monroe	2nd	Abraham Schulman	Republican	
Monroe	3rd	Earl C. Langenbacher*	Democrat	
Monroe	4th	Pat E. Provenzano	Republican	
Monroe	5th	Walter H. Wickins*	Republican	Chairman of Commerce and Navigation
Montgomery		L. James Shaver*	Republican	Chairman of Canals
Nassau	1st	John D. Bennett	Republican	
Nassau	2nd	Leonard W. Hall*	Republican	Chairman of Re-Apportionment; on November 8, 1938, elected to the 76th U.S. Congress
New York	1st	James J. Dooling*	Democrat	
New York	2nd	Nicholas A. Rossi*	Democrat	also a delegate to the Constitutional Convention
New York	3rd	Phelps Phelps*	Democrat	
New York	4th	Leonard Farbstein*	Democrat	
New York	5th	John F. Killgrew*	Democrat	
New York	6th	Meyer Goldberg	Republican	
New York	7th	William T. Middleton	Republican	
New York	8th	Stephen J. Jarema*	Democrat	
New York	9th	Ira H. Holley*	Democrat	
New York	10th	MacNeil Mitchell	Rep./City F.	
New York	11th	Patrick H. Sullivan*	Democrat	
New York	12th	Edmund J. Delany*	Democrat	also a delegate to the Constitutional Convention
New York	13th	William J. Sheldrick*	Democrat	
New York	14th	Francis J. McCaffrey Jr.*	Democrat	
New York	15th	Abbot Low Moffat*	Republican	Chairman of Ways and Means: also a delegate to the Constitutional Convention
New York	16th	Robert F. Wagner Jr.	Democrat	
New York	17th	Oscar Garcia Rivera	Rep./Am. L.	
New York	18th	Salvatore A. Farenga*	Democrat	
New York	19th	Robert W. Justice*	Democrat	
New York	20th	Walter V. Fitzgerald	Rep./Am. L.	
New York	21st	William T. Andrews*	Democrat	
New York	22nd	Daniel Flynn*	Democrat	
New York	23rd	William J. A. Glancy*	Democrat	
Niagara	1st	Fayette E. Pease*	Republican	Chairman of Conservation
Niagara	2nd	Harry D. Suitor*	Republican	Chairman of Codes
Oneida	1st	John J. Walsh	Democrat	
Oneida	2nd	William R. Williams*	Republican	
Oneida	3rd	C. Dean Williams	Republican	
Onondaga	1st	Leo W. Breed*	Republican	
Onondaga	2nd	George B. Parsons*	Republican	
Onondaga	3rd	Frank J. Costello*	Republican	
Ontario		Harry R. Marble*	Republican	Chairman of Printed and Engrossed Bills
Orange	1st	Lee B. Mailler*	Republican	Chairman of Mortgage and Real Estate
Orange	2nd	Charles N. Hammond	Republican	
Orleans		John S. Thompson*	Republican	Chairman of Public Service
Oswego		Ernest J. Lonis*	Republican	
Otsego		Chester T. Backus*	Republican	
Putnam		D. Mallory Stephens*	Republican	Chairman of Banks
Queens	1st	Mario J. Cariello*	Democrat	
Queens	2nd	Timothy P. Kirwan	Democrat	
Queens	3rd	John V. Downey*	Democrat	
Queens	4th	Daniel E. Fitzpatrick*	Democrat	
Queens	5th	William F. Dailey	Democrat	
Queens	6th	Joseph P. Teagle	Democrat	
Rensselaer	1st	Philip J. Casey*	Democrat	
Rensselaer	2nd	Maurice Whitney*	Republican	Chairman of Taxation and Retrenchment
Richmond	1st	Charles Bormann*	Democrat	
Richmond	2nd	Herman Methfessel*	Democrat	
Rockland		Lawrence J. Murray Jr.	Democrat	
St. Lawrence	1st	W. Allan Newell*	Republican	Chairman of Civil Service
St. Lawrence	2nd	Warren O. Daniels*	Republican	
Saratoga		Richard J. Sherman	Republican	
Schenectady	1st	Oswald D. Heck*	Republican	re-elected Speaker
Schenectady	2nd	Harold Armstrong*	Republican	Chairman of Affairs of Cities
Schoharie		Arthur L. Parsons*	Republican	
Schuyler		Dutton Peterson*	Republican	
Seneca		Lawrence W. Van Cleef*	Republican	
Steuben	1st	Guy W. Cheney*	Republican	
Steuben	2nd	William M. Stuart*	Republican	
Suffolk	1st	Edmund R. Lupton*	Republican	
Suffolk	2nd	Elisha T. Barrett*	Republican	
Sullivan		William A. Chandler	Republican	
Tioga		Myron D. Albro	Republican	
Tompkins		Stanley C. Shaw*	Republican	
Ulster		J. Edward Conway*	Republican	Chairman of General Laws
Warren		Harry A. Reoux*	Republican	Chairman of Judiciary
Washington		Herbert A. Bartholomew*	Republican	Chairman of Internal Affairs
Wayne		Harry L. Averill*	Republican	Chairman of Public Education
Westchester	1st	Christopher H. Lawrence	Republican	
Westchester	2nd	Theodore Hill Jr.	Republican	
Westchester	3rd	James E. Owens	Republican	
Westchester	4th	Jane H. Todd*	Republican	Chairwoman of Social Welfare
Westchester	5th	Arthur J. Doran*	Democrat	
Wyoming		Harold C. Ostertag*	Republican	Chairman of Affairs of Villages
Yates		Fred S. Hollowell*	Republican	Chairman of Excise

=== Employees ===
- Clerk: Ansley B. Borkowski

== Sources ==
- Members of Assembly—1938 in The State Employee (December 1937, Vol. 6, No. 9, pg. 16ff)
- Members of the New York Senate (1930s) at Political Graveyard
- Members of the New York Assembly (1930s) at Political Graveyard
- RULES GROUP OF ASSEMBLY ADDS MEMBER in the Rochester Democrat and Chronicle, of Rochester, on January 11, 1938
