= Frank Monaco =

American lawyer and politician

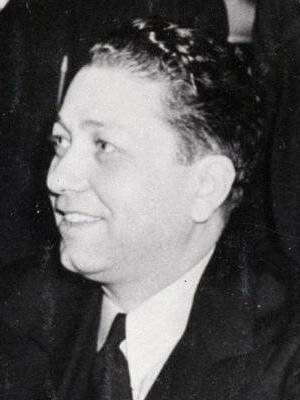
- Monaco in 1938

Member of the New York State Assembly from the 23rd Kings district
- In office January 1, 1938 – December 31, 1938
- Preceded by: G. Thomas LoRe
- Succeeded by: Robert Giordano

Personal details
- Born: July 29, 1898 Trapani, Sicily, Kingdom of Italy
- Died: March 16, 1968 (aged 69) New York City, U.S.
- Party: American Labor
- Spouse: Josephine
- Children: 3
- Education: St. John's University School of Law

Frank Monaco (July 29, 1898 – March 16, 1968) was an Italian-American journalist, lawyer and politician who served as a member of the New York State Assembly in 1938. He was one of five American Labor Party Assemblymen elected in 1937.

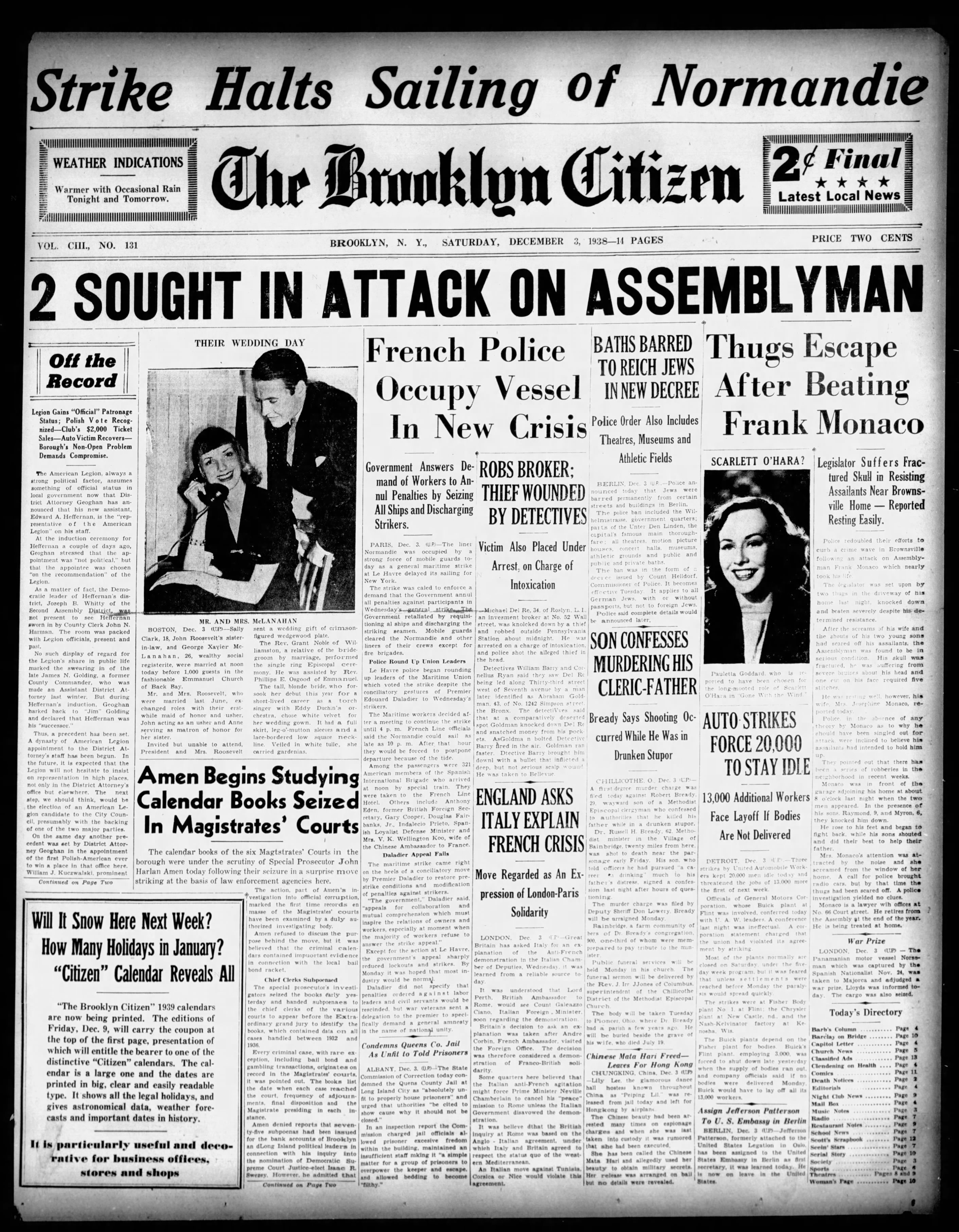
News of the attack on Monaco on the front page of The Brooklyn Citizen, December 3, 1938

On December 2, 1938, Monaco was attacked outside his home by two men and beaten to the point of "serious condition."

Monaco died on March 16, 1968, in New York City.

== Sources ==
New York State Assembly
Preceded by G. Thomas LoRe	New York State Assembly; Kings County, 23rd District; 1938	Succeeded by Robert Giordano
