= Gerard J. Muccigrosso =

American lawyer and politician (1911–1981)

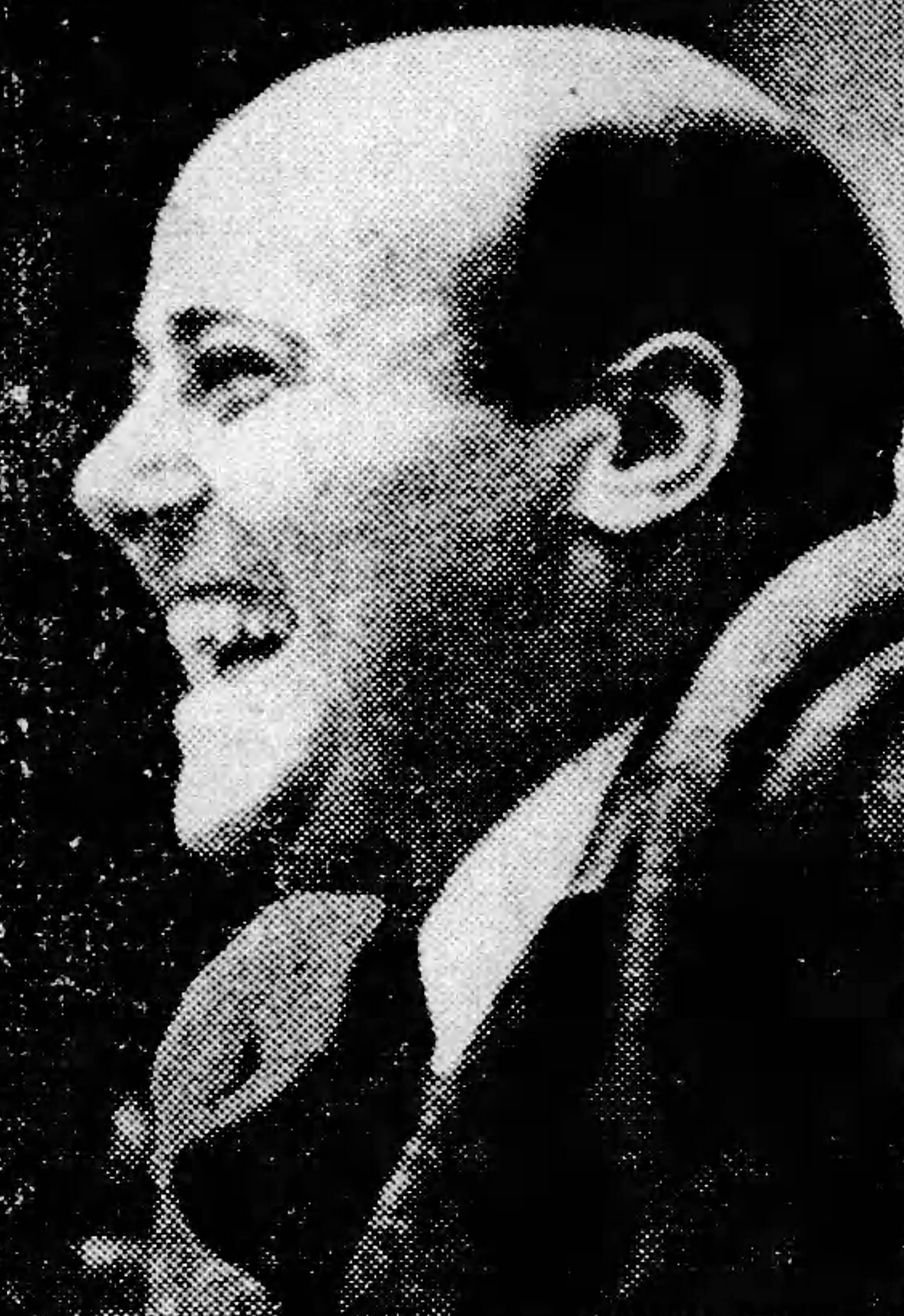
- Muccigrosso in 1938

Member of the New York State Assembly from the 7th Bronx district
- In office January 1, 1938 – December 31, 1938
- Preceded by: Bernard R. Fleisher
- Succeeded by: John A. Devany Jr.

Personal details
- Born: July 25, 1911 New York City, U.S.
- Died: February 12, 1981 (aged 69) Smithtown, New York, U.S.
- Party: American Labor (1936–1939); Republican (after 1940)
- Spouse(s): Rose Regina; Katherine Mazzucca
- Children: 3
- Education: Fordham School of Law

Gerard Joseph Muccigrosso (July 25, 1911 – February 12, 1981) was an American lawyer and politician who served as a member of the New York State Assembly in 1938.

== Biography ==
Muccigrosso graduated from Fordham College in 1931 and Fordham Law School in 1934. He was one of five American Labor Party Assemblymen elected in 1937. In 1938, he sponsored a bill to "cut the high cost of dying" by encouraging cheap funerals. That same year, he worked with the Women's Trade Union League to introduce three bills to improve standards for domestic workers by establishing a minimum wage and limiting working hours. He was not reelected in the November 1938 election, losing his seat to a member of the Republican Party. In 1939, he left the American Labor Party because of his concerns about Communist influence in the Party and in 1940 became a Republican.

== Personal life and death ==
He had a daughter, Jody Hoelle (née Josephine Muccigrosso), and two sons, Donald Muccigrosso and Michael Muccigrosso, and nine grandchildren, including Nicole Hoelle.

Muccigrosso died on February 12, 1981, in Smithtown, New York.

== Sources ==
New York State Assembly
| Preceded by Bernard R. Fleisher | New York State Assembly; Bronx County, 7th District; 1938 | Succeeded by John A. Devany Jr. |
