= Charles Belous =

American attorney and politician

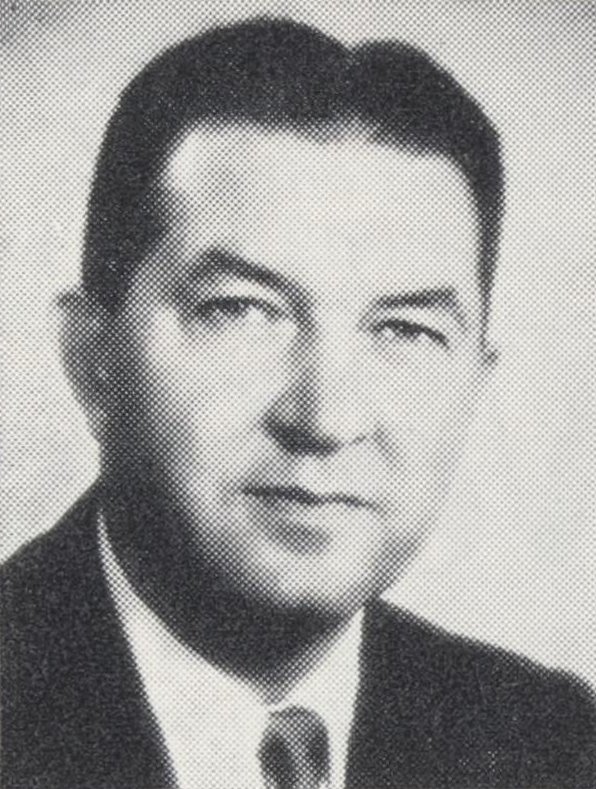

Member of the New York City Council from Queens At-Large
- In office January 1, 1938 – December 7, 1941
- Preceded by: Constituency established
- Succeeded by: Multi-member district

Personal details
- Born: January 4, 1907 Novoselytsia, Bessarabia Governorate. Russian Empire
- Died: July 13, 1966 (aged 59) Port Washington, New York, U.S.
- Party: City Fusion; American Labor; Liberal; Democratic
- Spouse: Grace
- Education: Columbia University Law School
- Occupation: Attorney, politician

Charles Belous (January 4, 1907 – July 13, 1966) was a Romanian-born American attorney and politician who served as a City Fusion-American Laborite member of the New York City Council from 1938 to 1941, representing Queens. He later joined the Liberal and Democratic Parties and served as Deputy Nassau County Attorney.

After his election to the City Council in 1937, he wrote a personal thank-you note to the Daily Worker for their support in his campaign. Three years later, he denounced the Communists involved with the ALP for trying to take over the party and make it a "front organization."

Belous died on July 13, 1966 in Port Washington, New York at the age of 59.
