= Eugene P. Connolly =

American labor leader and politician

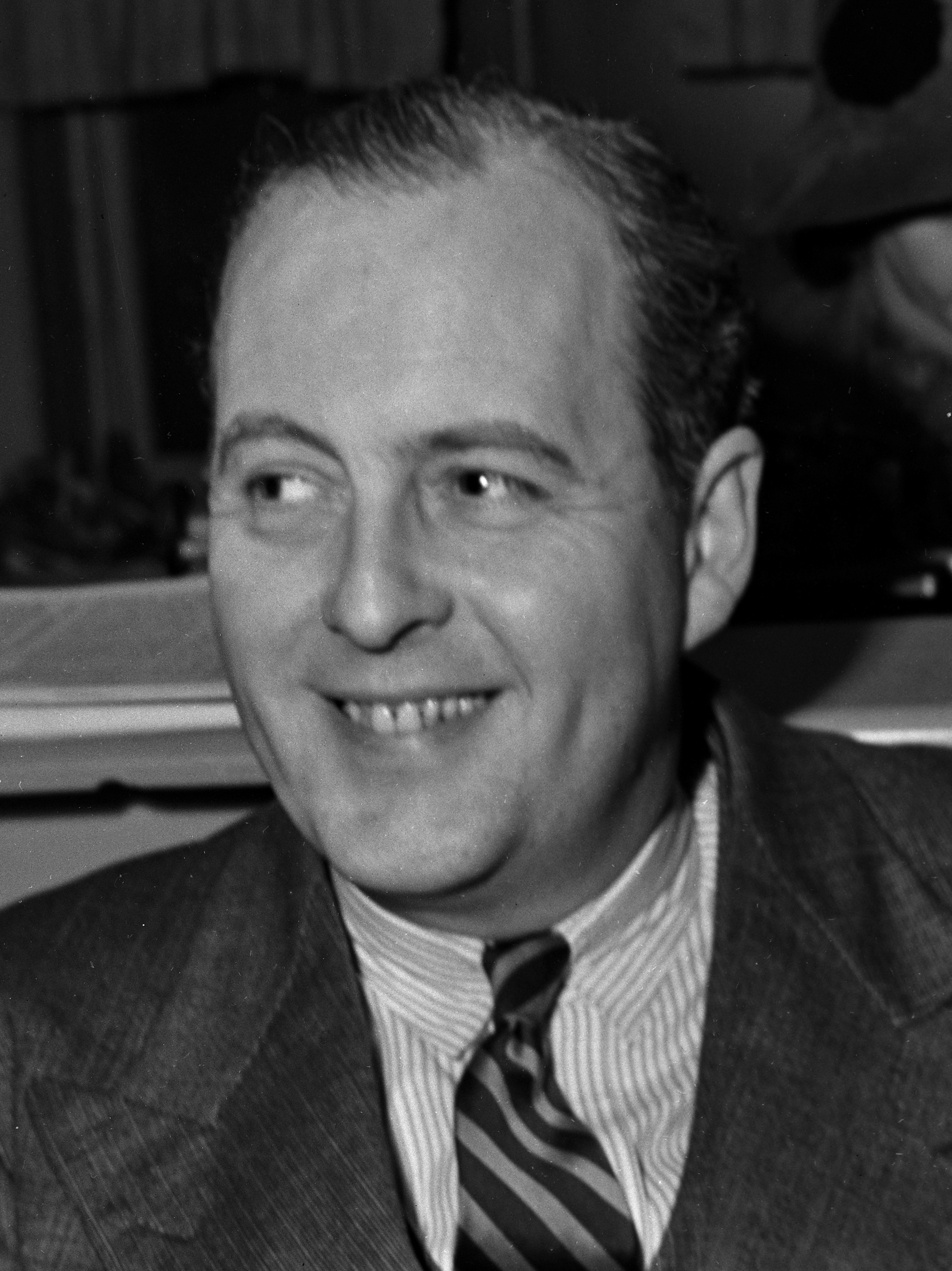
- Connolly in 1941

Member of the New York City Council from Manhattan At-Large
- In office January 1, 1946 – December 7, 1949
- Preceded by: Multi-member district
- Succeeded by: Constituency abolished

Personal details
- Born: November 9, 1901 New York City, U.S.
- Died: December 1, 1971 (aged 70) New York City, U.S.
- Party: Democratic (before 1936); American Labor (after 1936)
- Spouse(s): Frances Seley (m. 1925; died 1951) Marian Tuthill (m. 1964)
- Children: 2
- Occupation: Labor leader, politician

Eugene P. Connolly (November 9, 1901 – December 1, 1971) was an American labor leader and politician who served on the New York City Council from 1946 until he resigned in protest of Benjamin Davis's expulsion from that body in 1949.

== Biography ==
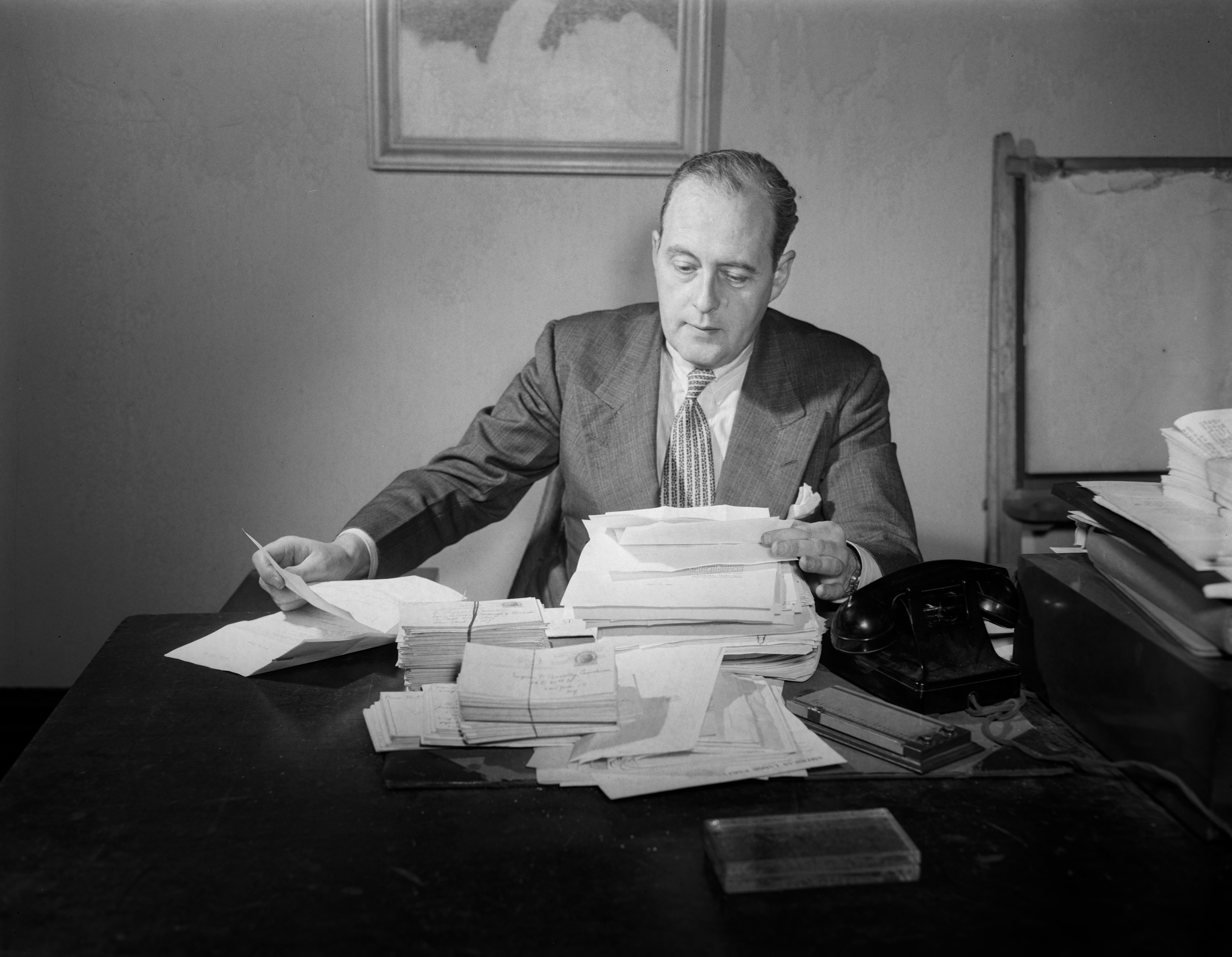
Councilman Connolly at his desk, May 1946

Connolly was active in the labor movement throughout his life, co-founding the National Maritime Union and serving as a lieutenant to John L. Lewis in the organization of the Congress of Industrial Organizations.

Originally a member of the Democratic Party, Connolly became fed up with the corruption of Tammany Hall and supported Republican Fiorello La Guardia in his successful campaign for mayor of New York City in 1933. Connolly then joined the American Labor Party, serving as executive secretary of the party in Manhattan.

Connolly ran unsuccessfully for State Assembly in 1937, Congress in 1938 and 1941, and City Council in 1943 before finally winning a seat on the Council in 1945. He ran twice more for Congress unsuccessfully in 1946 and 1948, as well as for Manhattan Borough President in 1949.

For several years a leader of the left wing of the American Labor Party alongside Vito Marcantonio, Connolly was a delegate to the 1948 Progressive National Convention.

Connolly died on December 1, 1971, at St. Vincent's Hospital in Manhattan.
