= Nathaniel M. Minkoff =

American labor leader and politician

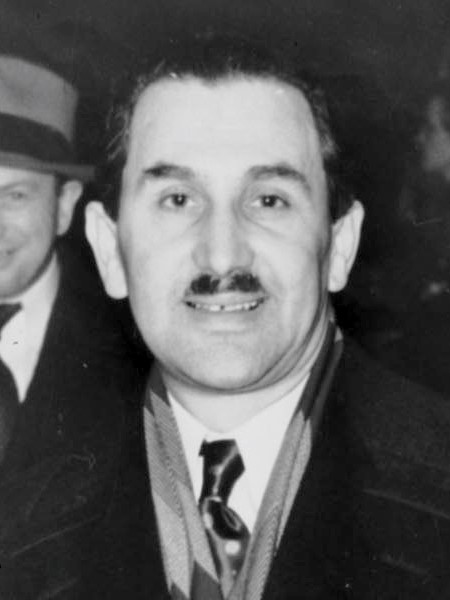
- Minkoff c. 1938

Member of the New York State Assembly from the 5th Bronx district
- In office January 1, 1938 – December 31, 1938
- Preceded by: Julius J. Gans
- Succeeded by: Julius J. Gans

Personal details
- Born: February 14, 1893 Minsk, Minsk Governorate, Russian Empire
- Died: January 16, 1984 (aged 90)
- Party: Socialist (before 1936); American Labor (after 1936)
- Spouse: Rebecca Edid (m. 1913)
- Children: Saul N. Minkoff
- Education: New York University

Nathaniel M. Minkoff (February 14, 1893 – January 16, 1984) was a Belarusian-American labor leader and politician who served as a member of the New York State Assembly in 1938.

== Life ==
Nathaniel M. Minkoff was born in Minsk (then a part of the Russian Empire) on February 14, 1893, the son of Mandel Minkoff. He became an accountant. In 1913, he married Rebecca Edid.

He was Secretary and Treasurer of Local 9 of the International Ladies Garment Workers Union from 1913 to 1919; and Director of the Records and Statistical Department of ILGWU from 1920 to 1925. Afterwards he was Secretary and Treasurer of the Joint Board of the Dress and Waistmakers Union of Greater New York, affiliated with ILGWU and the American Federation of Labor.

Minkoff was a member of the Socialist Party of America in the early 1930s, speaking at street meetings and working on Samuel Orr's 1933 State Senate campaign.

Minkoff joined the American Labor Party after its formation in 1936 and was elected to New York State Assembly in 1937 on a joint ALP-Socialist ticket. During the 1938 legislative session he was the Leader of the American Labor group consisting of five assemblymen. Minkoff was defeated for re-election in 1938 and 1940.

In April 1939, his only son, Secretary of the New York State Health Commission Saul N. Minkoff died aged 24 after an appendectomy.

Minkoff was active in the League for Industrial Democracy, eventually becoming the chairman of its board of directors in 1946 and its president in 1948, serving until his retirement in 1977. He also wrote for The New Leader, lectured at the Rand School of Social Science and identified as a democratic socialist.

He died on January 16, 1984; and was buried at the Mount Carmel Cemetery in Flushing, Queens. He was Jewish.

== Sources ==
New York State Assembly
Preceded by Julius J. Gans	New York State Assembly; Bronx County, 5th District; 1938	Succeeded by Julius J. Gans
