= Oscar García Rivera =

Puerto Rican politician (1900–1969)

Oscar Garcia Rivera Sr.
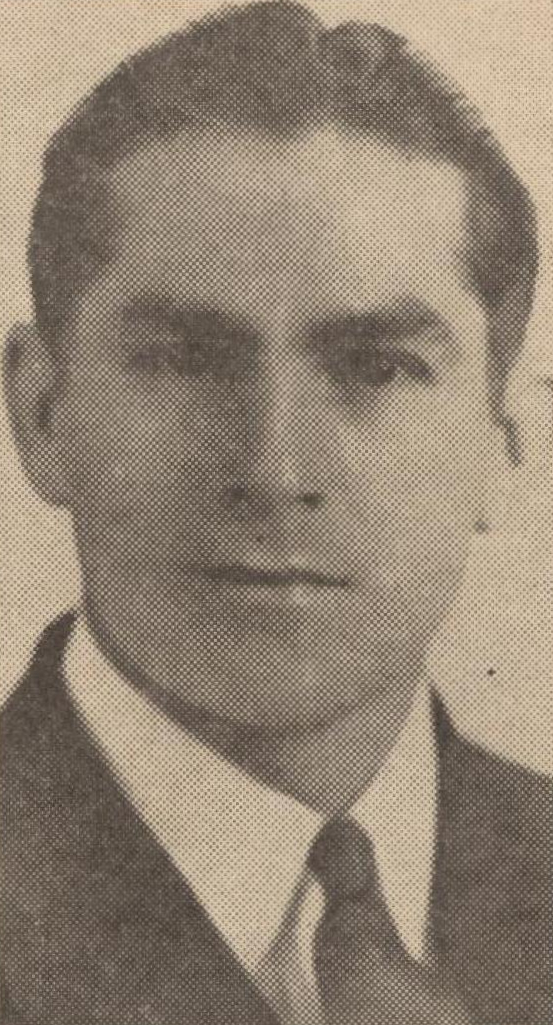
- Rivera c. 1937

Member of the New York State Assembly from the 17th New York district
- In office January 1, 1938 – December 31, 1940
- Preceded by: Meyer Alterman
- Succeeded by: Hulan Jack

Personal details
- Born: November 6, 1900 Mayagüez, Puerto Rico
- Died: February 14, 1969 (aged 68) Mayagüez, Puerto Rico
- Party: American Labor; Republican
- Spouse: Eloísa Rivera
- Children: Oscar Garcia Rivera Jr.
- Education: Harvard Law School
- Occupation: Politician, lawyer, New York State Assemblyman
- Known for: First Puerto Rican to be elected to public office in the continental United States, creation of the Unemployment Insurance Bill

Oscar Garcia Rivera Sr. (November 6, 1900 – February 14, 1969) was a politician, lawyer and activist. Garcia Rivera made history when in 1937 he became the first Puerto Rican to be elected to public office in the continental United States. In 1956, he also became the first Puerto Rican to be nominated as the Republican candidate for Justice of the City Court.

== Early years ==
Garcia Rivera was born in the city of Mayagüez, located in the western region of Puerto Rico, to a prosperous family who owned a coffee plantation. There he received his primary and secondary education. He attended the Escuela Central Grammar (Junior High School), where he was valedictorian of his graduating class in 1921, and in 1925 was the Class President of the graduating class from Mayagüez High School.

In 1917, during his school years, the United States became involved in World War I and the U.S. Congress approved the Jones-Shafroth Act, which gave Puerto Ricans a United States citizenship with limitations. Puerto Ricans became eligible for the military draft, plus they were now permitted to hold public office in the mainland United States, however Puerto Ricans in the island were not allowed to vote for the president nor were they allowed to have representatives in the US legislature, other than the Resident Commissioner, who did not have the right to vote in any of the measures presented before Congress.

== Labor activist ==
Garcia Rivera visited New York City as soon as he finished high school and returned home. In 1926, he moved to Manhattan and rented an apartment on West 110th Street in a barrio made up mostly of Puerto Ricans known as Spanish Harlem. Garcia Rivera applied for a position in the City Hall Postal Office and proceeded to take the Postal Clerk's examination. In the meantime he held a part-time job at the Boerum and Pease Binder factory in Brooklyn. He was a witness of the July 1926, "Harlem Riots" against the Puerto Rican. As the economic situation in the United States worsened in a prelude to the Great Depression, many Puerto Ricans in the mainland found themselves competing with other groups for the positions of unskilled labor such as dishwashers, maintenance and laundry workers. This led to the riots between unemployed Jews and Puerto Ricans.

With a score of 98.4% on his Postal Clerk examinations, Garcia Rivera was appointed to the City Hall Post Office. García Rivera became active in the Postal Clerks' Union of America. He encouraged other Puerto Rican and Hispanic employees to participate in the union and to seek higher wages and better working conditions. Prominent labor leaders in the country took notice, thereby earning their respect and support.

He used the money which he earned as a postal worker to pay for his tuition at St. John's University School of Law. In 1930, Garcia Rivera earned his law degree and married Eloísa Rivera with whom he had a son, Oscar García Rivera Jr. In April 1935, he was admitted to the Bar association and established a law practice in his apartment where he worked closely and provided significant support to the working class and the Puerto Rican community at times providing pro-bono representation and legal advice. He later relocated his practice to 113th Street and Fifth Avenue.

== Political career ==
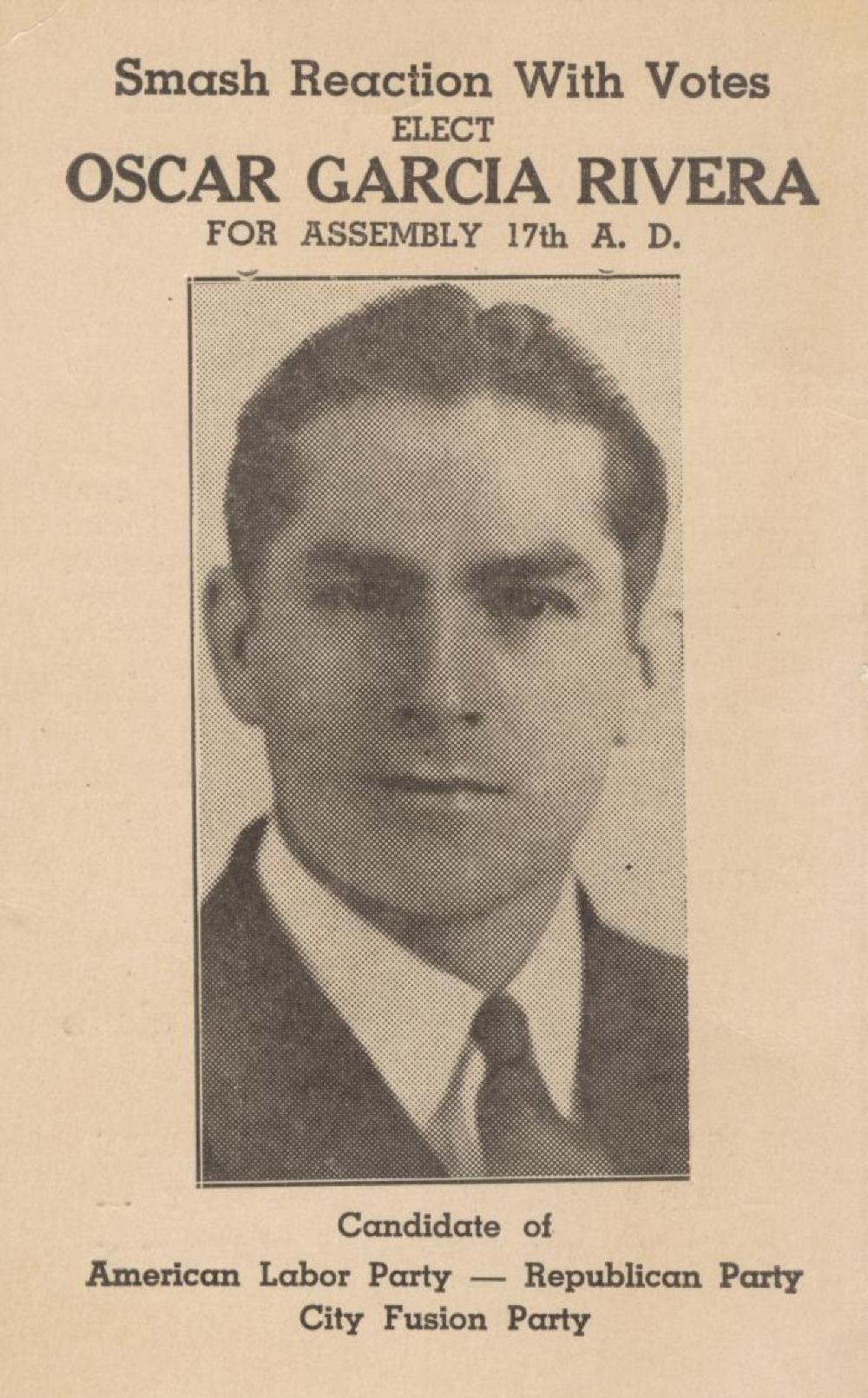
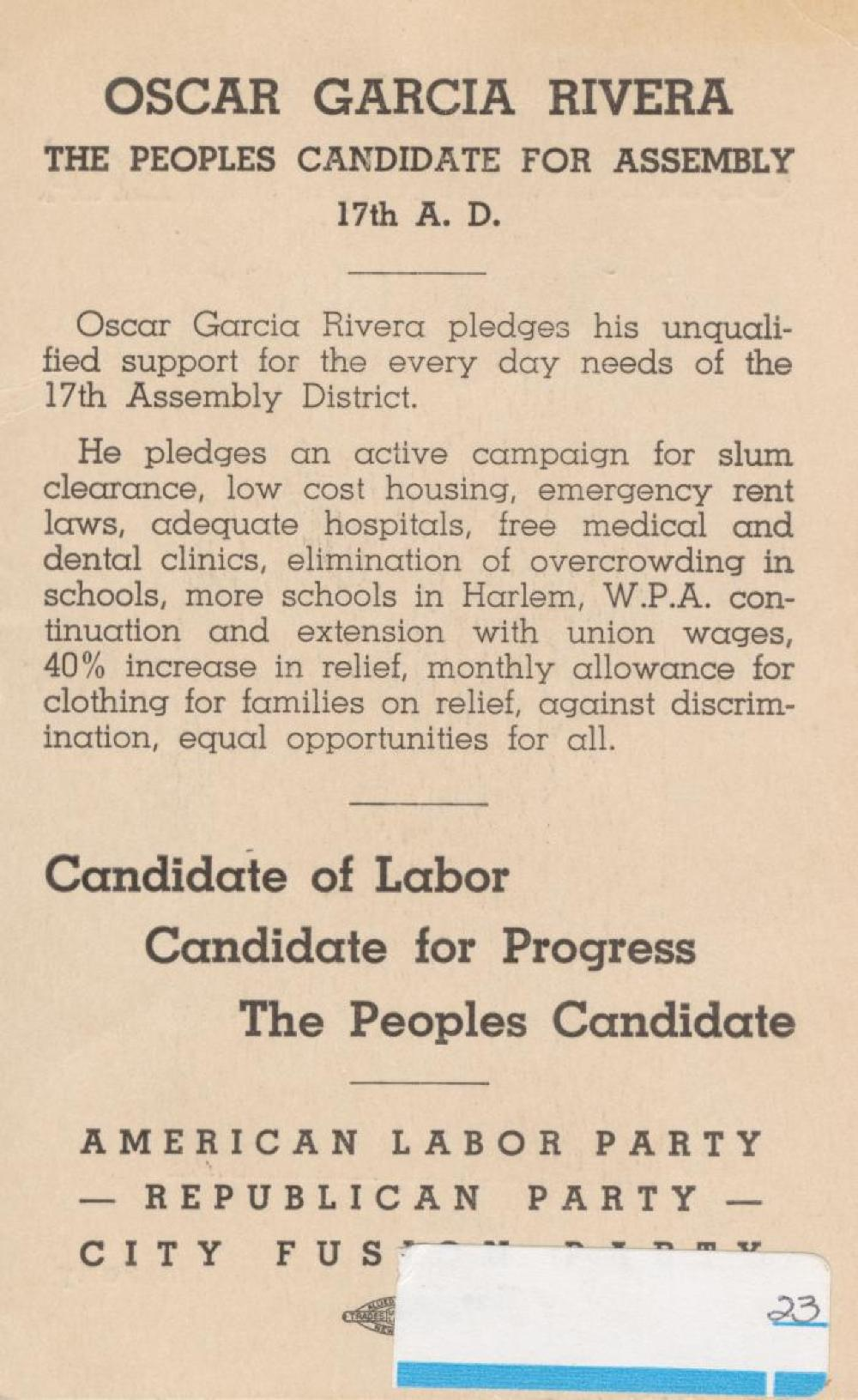
Front and back of a flyer promoting Rivera for State Assembly, 1937.

One of the consequences of the Great Depression was the employment opportunities were scarce across all of the United States. Unemployment was especially high in areas such as Spanish Harlem and gave rise to a high crime rate. Adding to the misery was that schools were overcrowded and housing was severely limited, plus discrimination by neighbors, government officials and police brutality was rampant. Another factor which made it difficult for the Puerto Ricans living in New York City was the language barrier. Their inability to communicate and be understood made it difficult for them to be properly represented before the authorities.

In 1937, Garcia Rivera, who had joined the Republican Party, launched his candidacy for the New York State Assembly as East Harlem's representative with the support of Independent Democrats, leftists, fusionists, labor unions, and the American Labor Party. Among those who supported his nomination were: New York City's Mayor Fiorello LaGuardia, Manhattan D.A. candidate Thomas E. Dewey, and Union leaders like Michael J. Quill, TWU, George Meany, AFL/CIO, Alex Rose and Benjamin MacLauren. He was elected to the Assembly (New York Co., 17th D.), thus becoming the first Puerto Rican in history to be elected to public office in the United States, and took his seat in the 161st New York State Legislature in 1938. In June 1938, he was refused a renomination by the Republicans, but was re-elected in November 1938 on the American Labor ticket only. He sat in the 162nd New York State Legislature in 1939 and 1940. During his term in office, he emphasized issues of child labor, protective laws for workers, labor services, and anti-discrimination legislation.

== Work as an Assemblyman ==
On February 3, 1939, the Assembly passed his "Unemployment Insurance Bill" which paved the way for the passage of bills establishing minimum hours and wages for working people, the creation of a Wage Board within the Labor Department, and the right of employees to organize and negotiate grievances. The following are the provisions of Garcia Rivera's "Unemployment Insurance Bill":

1. Make all employers, instead of those employing four or more persons, liable for contributions to the unemployment insurance fund.

2. Provide for payment of full 16 weeks' insurance benefits to claimants qualified by 18 weeks employment in any one year.

3. Reduce the necessary unemployment period, after application for benefits, from five to two weeks.

4. Make benefits available to anyone earning less than $5.a week instead of $2 a week.

Garcia Rivera also proposed labor related bills which provided for:

- Penalties for violators of the State's Labor Relations Act;
- Establishing minimum wages and minimum hours for men, women and children;
- Establishing a division of hours and wages (within the Labor Department) and
- The creation of a Wage Board.
- Bill calling for two days rest in seven for certain (Government) employees was also submitted by Assemblyman Oscar Garcia Rivera on January 17, 1939. Other labor related bills submitted by Garcia Rivera provided for:
- Certificates of Incorporation of Labor Organizations
- The right of employees to organize and negotiate on grievances, and
- An appropriation to The State Labor Department for its responsibilities of certifying private employment agencies

In 1940, he was a delegate to the Republican National Convention in Philadelphia.

== Later years ==
In 1956, Garcia Rivera became the first Puerto Rican to be nominated as the Republican candidate for Justice of the City Court. Garcia Rivera was an active member of the legal community and served as President and Board Member of the Puerto Rican Bar Association of New York.

Garcia Rivera and his wife later moved back to Puerto Rico. He died on February 14, 1969, in Mayagüez, Puerto Rico, of a cerebral hemorrhage.

Garcia Rivera's son Oscar Jr., followed his fathers footsteps. He graduated from Harvard Law School and was active in the Puerto Rican community. Garcia-Rivera Jr. was the director of the youth organization ASPIRA, and in 1978 was named executive director of the Puerto Rican Legal Defense Fund which he helped create. From 1979 to 1981 he served on the staff of President Jimmy Carter. He died on August 5, 2000, after a brief and sudden illness.

== Legacy ==
García Rivera left behind a collection of materials, "The Oscar García Rivera Papers," which consists of correspondence, speeches, articles, photographs, a subject file, and printed matter pertaining to the political career of Oscar García Rivera. The papers provide an insight as to labor politics and the political and social alliances created amongst emerging ethnic communities in New York City in the first part of the twentieth century.

On February 22, 2002 The United States Post Office building located at 153 East 110th Street, East Harlem New York "Hellgate" was renamed the Oscar Garcia Rivera Post Office Building and on January 1, 2000, Garcia Rivera became the first Inductee in the East Harlem.com Hall of Fame.

== See also ==
- List of Puerto Ricans — Politicians
- Puerto Rican migration to New York

== Notes ==
New York State Assembly
Preceded by Meyer Alterman	New York State Assembly; New York County, 17th District; 1938–1940	Succeeded by Hulan E. Jack
