= Wellington Roe =

American author and political activist

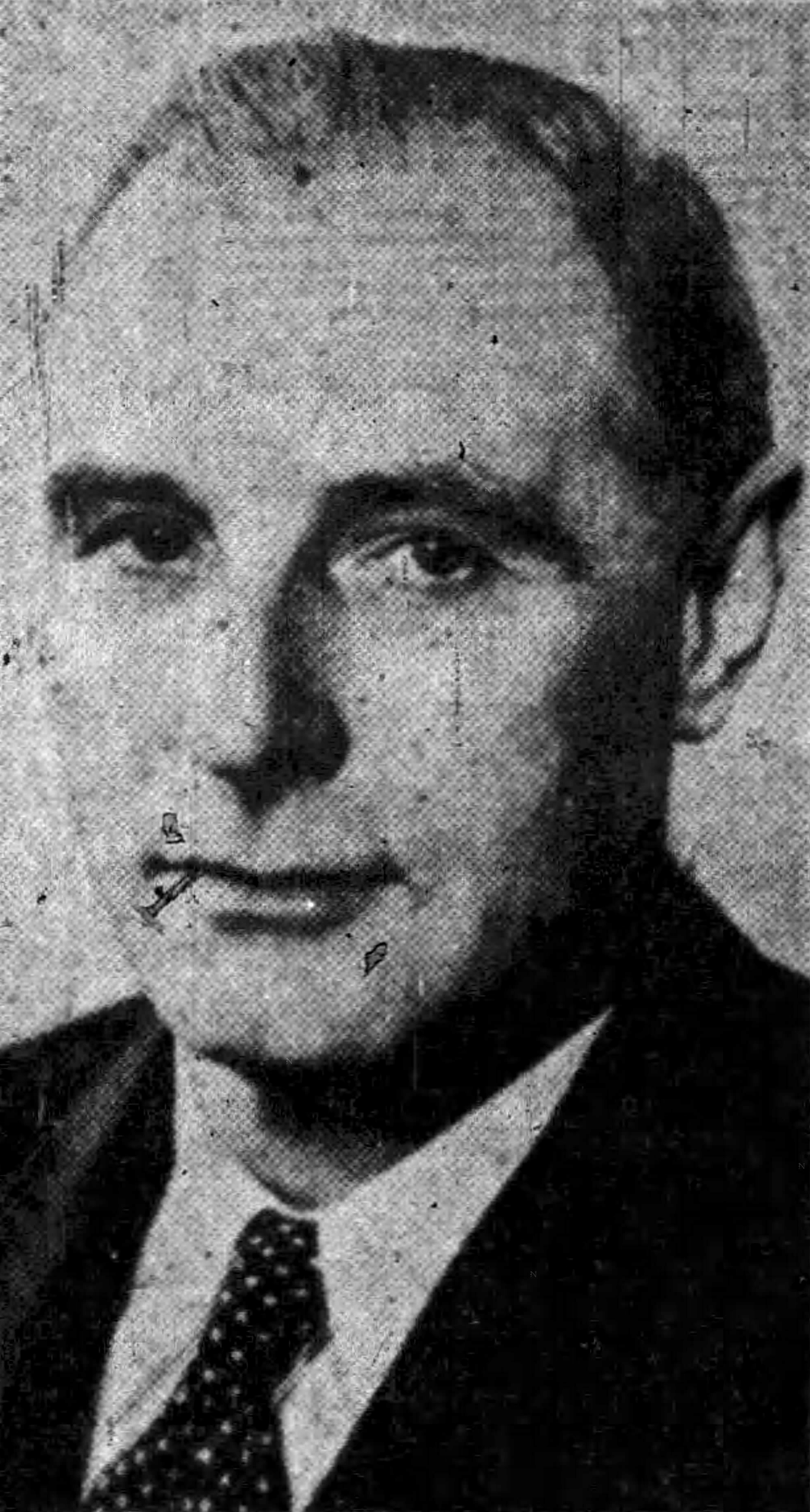
Roe c. 1952

Wellington Roe (May 27, 1898 – February 3, 1952) was an American author and political activist with the American Labor Party.

== Biography ==
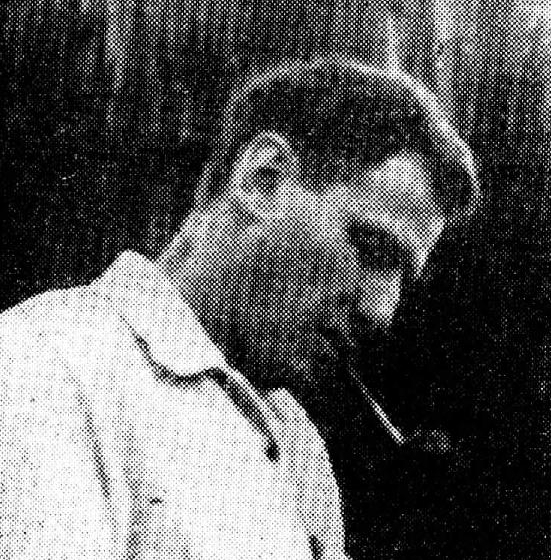
Roe c. 1940

Roe was born in Danbury, Connecticut and attended Wesleyan University. He moved to Florida in the 1920s, where he was involved in the advertising business and was accused of check forgery in 1921. In 1924, Roe was involved in a real estate partnership in Fort Lauderdale, where he gained a reputation as the "gaudiest local character of the boom". Following a hurricane in September 1926, the firm's properties were destroyed and Roe abandoned his business partners. In 1937, he published The Tree Falls South, a novel about Kansas farmers during the Dust Bowl. The following year he published Begin No Day, a novel about labor relations in the hatting industry in Connecticut. Eleanor Roosevelt wrote that "the difficulties of labor and management are truthfully pictured" in the novel. Roe was a member of the League of American Writers. Roe attempted to discredit Jan Valtin, writing an expose of him for the newspaper PM that was never published.

Roe was a founding member of the American Labor Party in New York. Bella Dodd wrote that she had "not known him as a [Communist] Party member but as a liberal...one who did not mind being used for their campaigns." He ran for election as an American Labor Party candidate for Congress in 1940. He received 5.5% of the vote, losing the election to James A. O'Leary. Roe became a member of Lodge 598 of the Brotherhood of Railroad Trainmen in 1944 but was expelled in 1946. During his time in the union he was the special assistant to Alexander F. Whitney. Despite his early support of railroad unions, he later became critical of labor unions, believing they were "often dictatorships in which labor bosses are the autocratic rulers of the dues-paying members". His 1948 book Juggernaut expressed these views on unions through profiles of labor leaders like David Dubinsky and Samuel Gompers. He resigned from the American Labor Party in 1948, stating that he could not support the candidacy of Henry Wallace. Roe died in February 1952.

== Bibliography ==
- The Tree Falls South (1937)
- Begin No Day (1938)
- Juggernaut: American Labor in Action (1948)
