= Benjamin Brenner =

American lawyer and politician

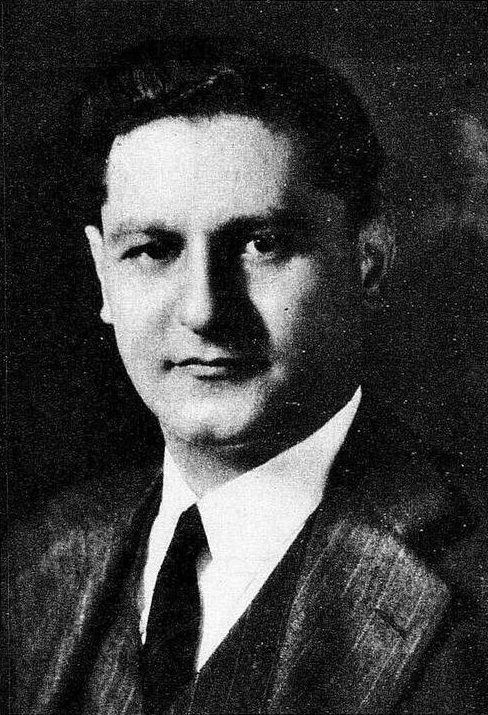
- Brenner c. 1939

Justice of the New York Supreme Court
- In office January 1, 1953 – December 31, 1969
- Succeeded by: John H. Finn

New York City Magistrate
- In office September 27, 1948 – December 31, 1952
- Appointed by: William O'Dwyer
- Preceded by: James M. Fawcett
- Succeeded by: Anthony J. Travia

Judge of the New York City Municipal Court, 8th District
- In office May 10, 1939 – December 31, 1939
- Appointed by: Fiorello La Guardia
- Preceded by: Murray Hearn
- Succeeded by: Harold J. McLaughlin

Member of the New York State Assembly from the 2nd Kings district
- In office January 1, 1938 – December 31, 1938
- Preceded by: Albert D. Schanzer
- Succeeded by: Leo F. Rayfiel

Personal details
- Born: August 3, 1903 Congress Poland
- Died: May 30, 1970 (aged 66) Hollywood, Florida, U.S.
- Party: American Labor; City Fusion; Liberal; Democratic
- Education: New York University; Brooklyn Law School

Benjamin Brenner (August 3, 1903 – May 30, 1970) was a Polish-born Jewish-American lawyer and politician from New York who served as a member of the New York State Assembly in 1938, as a New York city judge in 1939 and again from 1948 to 1952, and as a Justice of the New York Supreme Court from 1953 to 1969.

== Life ==
Benjamin Brenner was born on August 3, 1903 in Poland.

Brenner was a member of the New York State Assembly in 1938, elected in November 1937 on the American Labor and City Fusion tickets in the 2nd assembly district of Brooklyn. He was defeated when running for re-election in 1938 on the Republican and American Labor tickets. On May 10, 1939, Brenner was appointed by Mayor Fiorello LaGuardia to the Municipal Court (8th D.) to fill the vacancy caused by the appointment of Murray Hearn to the City Court. In November 1939, he was defeated when running for a full term, and left the bench at the end of the year. In 1940, he ran in the 8th district for Congress but was defeated by Democrat Donald L. O'Toole.

In July 1944, he was elected Chairman of the Liberal Party in Brooklyn. On September 27, 1948, he was appointed by Mayor William O'Dwyer as a City Magistrate.

He was a justice of the New York Supreme Court from 1953 to 1969. In September 1960, he was nominated on the Liberal ticket for the New York Court of Appeals; but declined to run.

At the end of 1969, he resigned from the bench due to ill health, and moved to Fort Lauderdale, Florida. He died on May 30, 1970, in Memorial Hospital in Hollywood, Florida, of heart disease.

== Sources ==
New York State Assembly
Preceded by Albert D. Schanzer	New York State Assembly; Kings County, 2nd District; 1938	Succeeded by Leo F. Rayfiel
