= Willens =

Willens is a surname. Notable people with the surname include:

- Doris Willens (1924–2021), American singer-songwriter, journalist, advertising executive and author
- Harold Willens (1914–2003), Ukrainian-American businessman and political activist
- Heather Willens (born 1971), American tennis player
- Howard P. Willens (born 1931), American lawyer and author

== See also ==
- Willen (disambiguation)
