= Annette Rubinstein =

American Marxist educator, literary critic, and activist

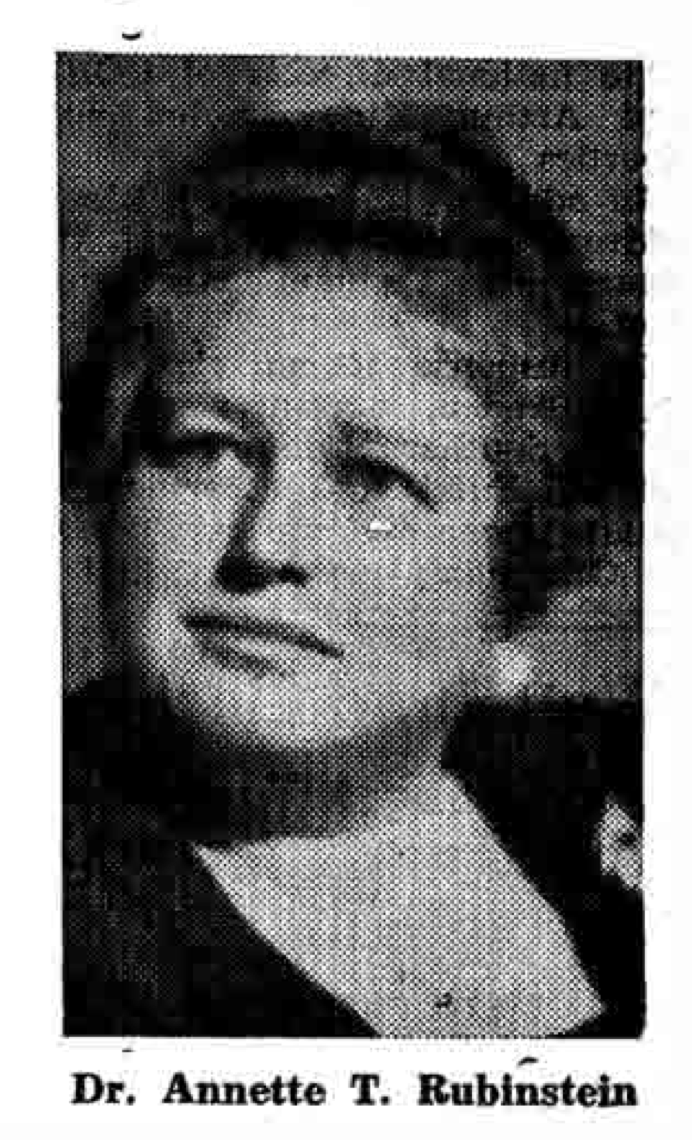
Rubinstein c. 1966

Annette Teta Rubinstein (April 12, 1910 – June 20, 2007) was an American Marxist educator, literary critic, and activist.

== Background ==
Rubinstein was born on April 12, 1910, on the Lower East Side, in New York City. Both of her parents, Abraham and Jean Rubinstein, were teachers. She earned her PhD from Columbia University.

== Career ==
Rubinstein became principal of the Robert Louis Stevenson High School.

Rubinstein joined the Communist Party in the 1930s and remained a secret member of the Party until 1952. She was also active in the American Labor Party, and served as its state vice-chairman. She met American Labor Party politician Vito Marcantonio in 1934 and later worked for him as an adviser. In 1958, she ran for Lieutenant Governor of New York on the Independent-Socialist ticket.

Rubinstein taught in East Germany between 1960 and 1962 and served as the vice-chairman of the German-American Friendship Society, which advocated for American recognition of the German Democratic Republic.

== Works ==
As a writer and literary critic, Rubinstein was the author of the two-volume book The Great Tradition in English Literature: From Shakespeare to Shaw, which focused "from a Marxist perspective on the relationship of political and social movements to 'major literary works'.

Rubinstein edited Marcantonio's collection of speeches, I Vote My Conscience (1956), which influenced the next generation of young radicals.

== Legacy ==
Rubinstein's papers are held in the Tamiment Library at New York University.
