= Ira Gollobin =

American lawyer

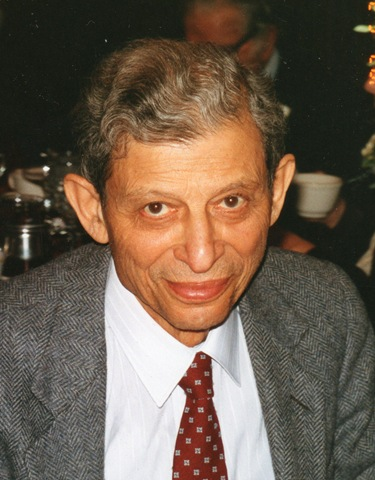
- Ira Gollobin
- Born: July 18, 1911; Newark, New Jersey, U.S.
- Died: April 4, 2008 (aged 96); New York City, U.S.
- Education: CCNY, Fordham Law School
- Known for: civil rights and immigration attorney

Ira Gollobin (July 18, 1911 – April 4, 2008) was a civil rights and immigration attorney who was involved for over seven decades in civil liberties, immigration, and extradition cases. Gollobin wrote extensively on the civil liberties and civil rights of both the native- and foreign-born.

== Personal life and education ==
Gollobin was born in Newark, New Jersey to first generation immigration parents from Czechoslovakia and Ukraine, who had arrived as infants to the United States in 1885. Gollobin attended the City College of City University of New York (CCNY) in the late 1920s and 1930s where he developed two lifelong interests: Latin and law, and was greatly influenced by one of his professors, the eminent Morris Raphael Cohen. While at CCNY he enrolled in Fordham Law School where he received his LL.B. degree and passed the New York Bar Examination in June 1933.

Gollobin was married to Esther Adler until her death on February 11, 1981. They had two daughters who grew up on the Lower East Side of Manhattan. He later married Ruth Axelbank Baharis, the one-time head of the Midwest ACPFB. Gollobin died on April 4, 2008.

== Career ==
Gollobin had a long career as a civil rights attorney who focused on immigration law. He worked for the American Committee for Protection of Foreign Born from 1936 to 1982 including some time as their general counsel. He served on the National Coalition for Haitian Refugees and helped those who were under investigation by the House Un-American Activities Committee. His papers, including a number of case files, are held by NYU and the New York Public Library.

Gollobin was a founding member of the National Lawyers Guild. In 1938, Gollobin met Carol Weiss King, another founding member of the National Lawyers Guild and the lead lawyer for the ACPFB. He assisted the League of American Writers from 1937 to 1938 to successfully get a number of anti-Nazi German writers admitted to the United States and from 1938 through 1940 helped refugees from the Spanish Civil War. Gollobin was counsel to the Transport Workers Union of America (1939–1940) thereby securing citizenship for almost 1,500 subway workers. He continued citizenship matters for the Greater New York Industrial Union Council (CIO) from 1940-1942.

=== Military service ===
Drafted into the U.S. Army in November 1942 as a staff sergeant, Gollobin was assigned to the Judge Advocate General Staff Section in the Philippines. In January 1946 he was one of the principal organizers of a GI demobilization demonstration movement in Manila and was honorably discharged in March, 1946.

=== Anti-HUAC efforts ===
In the late 1940s until 1966, Gollobin's practice expanded as the need for legal representation for citizens and non-citizens alike called before the House Un-American Activities Committee (HUAC; HUAC) and the Senate International Security Committee.

In 1948 before HUAC, Gollobin provided counsel to Victor Perlo, whom Elizabeth Bentley and Whittaker Chambers alleged had led (Bentley's "Perlo Group") and partaken in (Chambers's "Ware Group") a communist "apparatus" in Washington made up of Federal officials. (NLG fellow Carol Weiss King represented J. Peters in related hearings.)

Gollobin fought for 16 years (1951–1967), all the way to the Supreme Court of the United States, before victory was achieved in Hong Hai Chew v. Colding [344 U.S. 590, 595 (1953)].

=== Books ===
In 1986, Gollobin published Dialectical Materialism: Its Laws, Categories and Practice, a book which he had started in 1950. It is an exposition and history of dialectical materialism. He is also the author of a memoir, Winds of Change: An Immigration Lawyer’s Perspective on Fifty Years.
