= Shaemas O'Sheel =

American poet

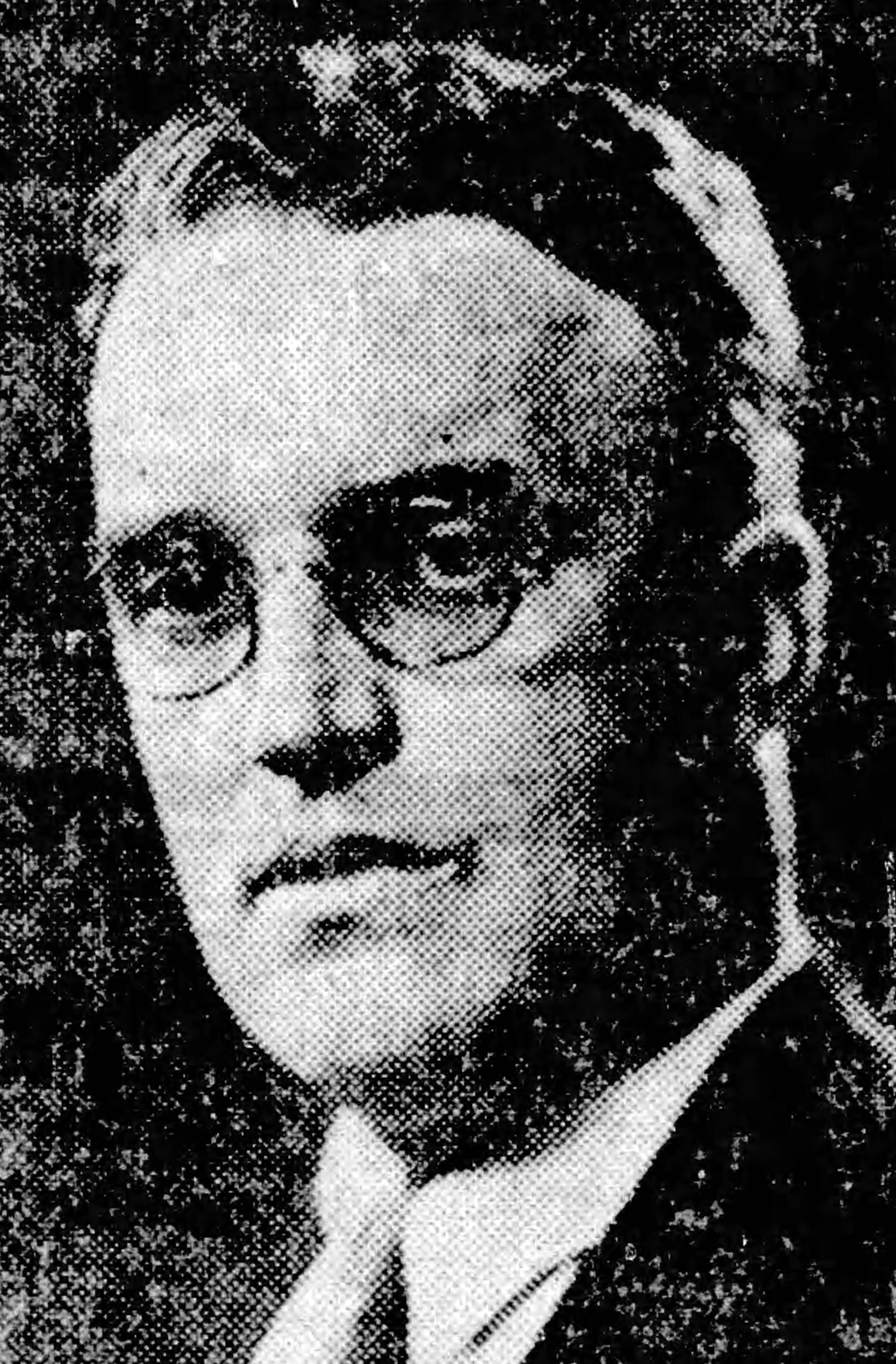
Portrait by Bachrach c. 1927

Shaemas O'Sheel (September 19, 1886 – April 2, 1954) was an Irish American poet and critic. Born James Shields, he changed his name to an anglicized spelling of its Irish version soon after high school. He worked briefly for the United States Senate (1913–1916), held jobs with various newspapers, and did publicity and advertising work. Although third-generation Irish American and never visiting Ireland, he was active in the Irish independence movement. He was, in his own words, "a very ardent communist and a staunch supporter of the Soviet Union". However, because he disagreed with Soviet foreign policy, many communist publications (such as New Masses) refused to publish his work. O'Sheel met the American painter, Marsden Hartley, through Alfred Stieglitz in 1909.

As a member of the League of American Writers, O'Sheel served on its Keep America Out of War Committee in January 1940 during the period of the Hitler-Stalin pact.

== Publications ==
O'Sheel's published poetry collections include The Blossomy Bough (1912) and The Light Feet of Goats (1915). Louis Untermeyer characterized O'Sheel's poetry as possessing "mysticism and a muffled heroism". O'Sheel's work also appeared in the New York Times, the New York Times Book Review, Harper's, and other national publications.

== Works ==
- O'Sheel, Shaemas (1912). The Blossomy Bough. New York, New York: Franklin Press for S. O Sheel.
- O'Sheel, Shaemas (1915). The Catechism of Balaam, Jr. New York, New York: Hugh H. Masterson.
- O'Sheel, Shaemas (1915). The Catechism of Balaam, Jr. New York, New York: Franklin Press for S. O Sheel.
- O'Sheel, Shaemas (1915). The Light Feet of Goats. New York, New York: Hugh H. Masterson.
- O'Sheel, Shaemas (1915). A Trip through Headline Land. New York, New York: Fatherland Corp.
- Genthe, Arnold (1916). The Book of the Dance. New York, New York: M. Kennerly. LCCN 16020296. (Introductory Essay by O'Sheel: "On With the Dance.")
- O'Sheel, Shaemas (1928). Jealous of Dead Leaves. New York, New York: Boni & Liveright. LCCN 28009779.
- O'Sheel, Shaemas (1931). Sophokles, Antigone: A New Redaction in the American Language. Brooklyn, New York: private printing. LCCN 32000998.
- Hale, Gardener (1933). Fresco Painting. New York, New York: W.E. Rudge. LCCN 33032351. (Additional chapters prepared from Mr. Hale's notes by Shaemas O'Sheel.)
- O'Sheel, Shaemas (1961). Antigone, and Selected Poems. Philadelphia, Pa.: University of Pennsylvania Press. LCCN 59009829/L.
