= Lawrence J. Murray Jr. =

American politician

Lawrence J. Murray (June 20, 1910 – March 15, 2000) was an American lawyer and politician from New York.

== Life ==
He was born on June 20, 1910, the son of Lawrence J. Murray (born 1874) and Emma (Brennan) Murray and attended St. Peter's Parochial School in Haverstraw.

Murray Jr was a Democratic member of the New York State Assembly (Rockland Co.) in 1938 and 1939–40. In January 1940, he was charged with embezzling. For some time, he had stolen a total amount of $49,102 from the accounts of a mentally incompetent client which he subsequently lost betting on horses. On April 4, 1940, he was convicted of first-degree grand larceny, and the next day sentenced to 5 to 10 years in prison. The conviction automatically removed him from his Assembly seat, and he was disbarred by the Appellate Division. He was released on parole by Governor Charles Poletti on December 29, 1942.

In March 1952, Murray was arrested for illegally taking bets.

Murray died on March 15, 2000.

== Sources ==
New York State Assembly
| Preceded by Laurens M. Hamilton | New York State Assembly; Rockland County; 1938–1940 | Succeeded by Robert Doscher |
