= Minneola Ingersoll =

American labor activist (1913–1974)

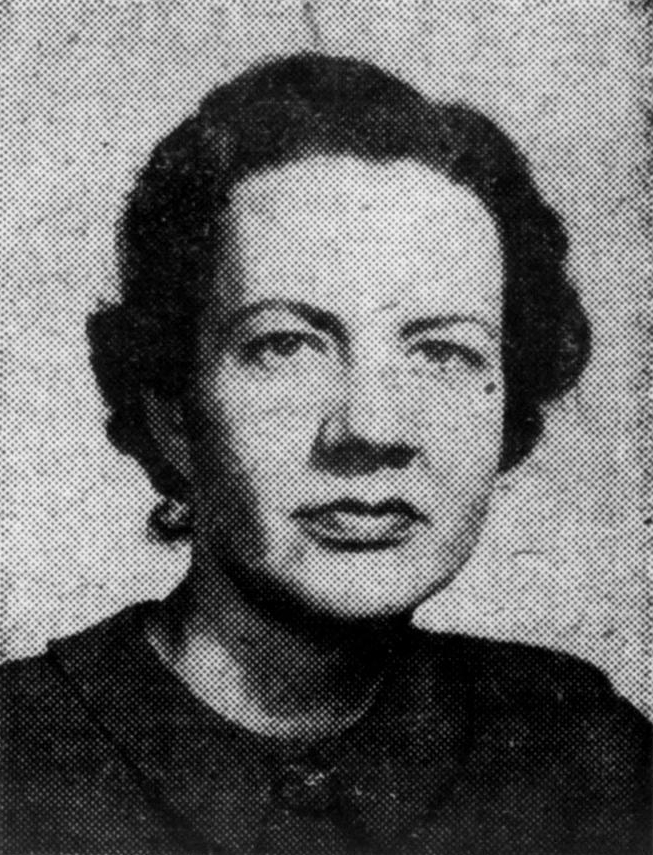
Ingersoll c. 1949

Minneola Ingersoll (1913 – July 16, 1974) was an American labor activist and was involved with politics through the Progressive Party.

== Biography ==
Minneola Ingersoll was born in Montgomery, Alabama, in 1913. She went to Huntingdon College there, and earned her degree in sociology. She died on July 16, 1974, from cancer. She was married to Jeremiah Ingersoll, and the couple had two children, Andrew Ingersoll and Barbara Rothenberg.

Ingersoll was a member of the Progressive Party and the Progressive Citizens of America in New York. In 1949, she ran for Congress as the American Labor Party candidate.

Ingersoll was one of the early women recruiters for the Steel Workers Organizing Committee (SWOC) in Chicago, Illinois. She was present at the Memorial Day Massacre of 1937.

Ingersoll was president of the Willoughby Settlement House in Brooklyn from 1963 to 1965, where she drafted plans to further the education of pregnant women.

She was also a member of the Women's City Club of New York, and was president from 1966 to 1970.

Ingersoll sat on the Board of Higher Education at the Herbert H. Lehman College in New York starting from 1969.

Ingersoll died from cancer at her home in Brooklyn on July 16, 1974, at the age of 61.
