= Elinore Morehouse Herrick =

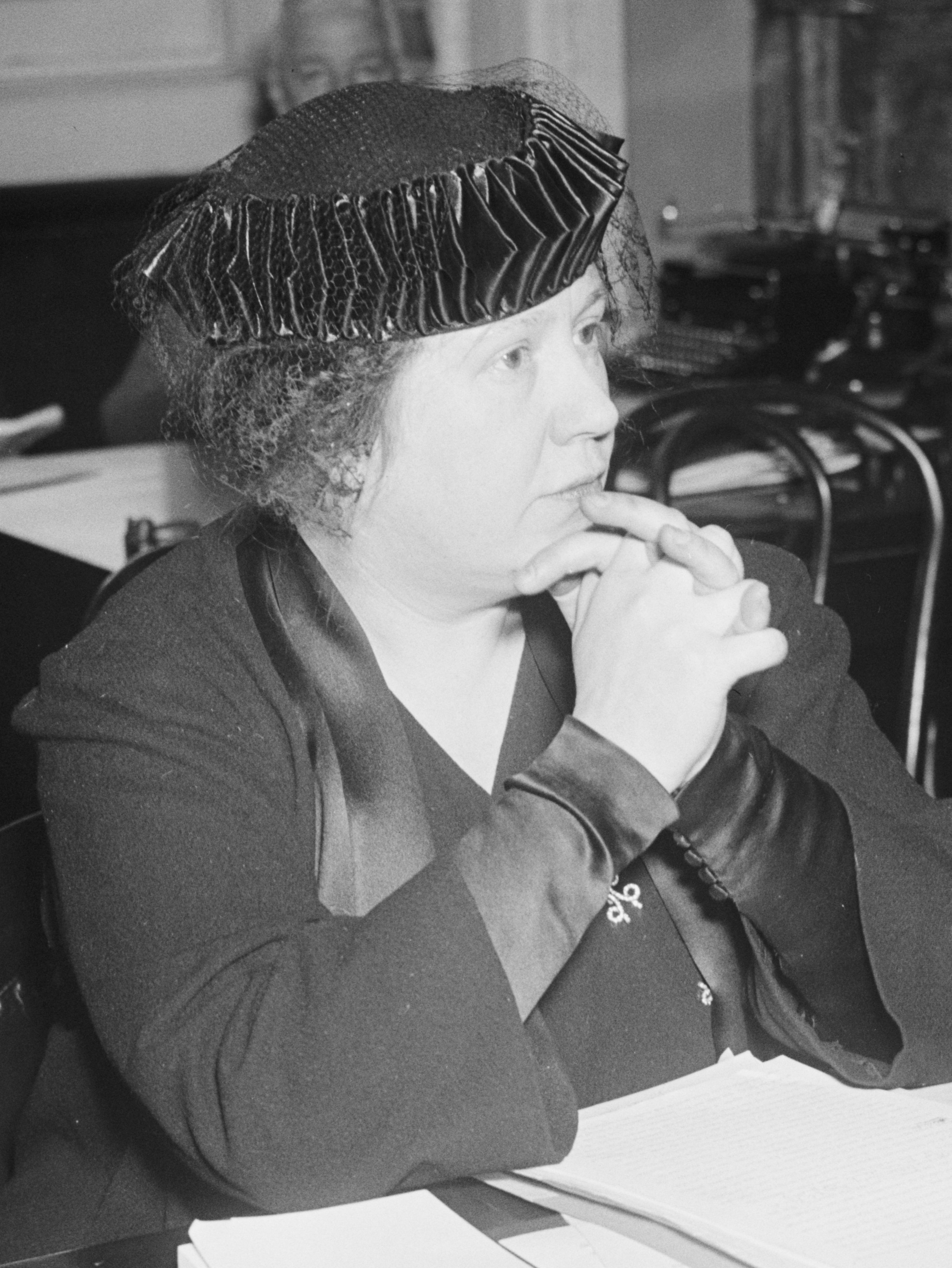
- Born: June 15, 1895; New York City
- Died: October 11, 1964 (aged 69); North Carolina
- Spouse: Horace Terhune Herrick (m. 1916; div. 1921)
- Children: 2

Elinore Morehouse Herrick (June 15, 1895 – October 11, 1964) was an American labor-relations specialist.

== Early life ==
Herrick was born in New York City on June 15, 1895. She was the eldest child of Daniel Webster Morehouse, a Unitarian minister, and Martha Adelaide Morehouse, the first female university administrator of the Pratt Institute. The family moved to New England after her father suffered from ill health, ultimately dying when Herrick was nine years old. She grew up in Springfield, Massachusetts, attending the MacDuffie School for Girls and the Technical High School. She enrolled at Barnard College in 1913 to study economics, while taking classes at the Columbia University School of Journalism. She worked as a junior reporter for the New York World to pay for university. While studying, she met activists and journalists at the homes of Talcott Williams and Charles A. Beard. However, in 1915, she failed out of the university.

In 1916, she married Horace Terhune Herrick, a chemical engineer. The couple had two sons.

== Career ==
Herrick worked in factories for six years. Her first job was at a shoe–blacking plant. She then worked at a paper–box plant and in a rayon factory, where she worked on a spooling machine. After a while, she became a production chief at the rayon plant. She then went to Tennessee where she trained workers as a head of production.

Herrick worked to avoid strikes and settle labor disputes. She said that “mutual good-will” would stabilize the industries. In 1934, Herrick was invited by Fiorello La Guardia, the then-mayor of New York City, to advise the city's administration on labor issues, concentrating on enforcing the state's minimum wage law. From 1935 to 1942, she was New York director of the National Labor Relations Board. While in this position, Herrick settled labor disputes, mostly between unions and employers. She advocated for New York to adopt a state minimum wage as executive secretary of the Consumers League of New York. Herrick was a member of the New York state committee that worked to create laws regarding women in war plants in 1942. In 1943, Herrick was appointed to the board of directors of the Associated Hospital Service of New York. After the conclusion of World War II, Herrick led the personnel department of the New York Herald Tribune and was a part of the editorial staff.
