= Pearl Willen =

American activist

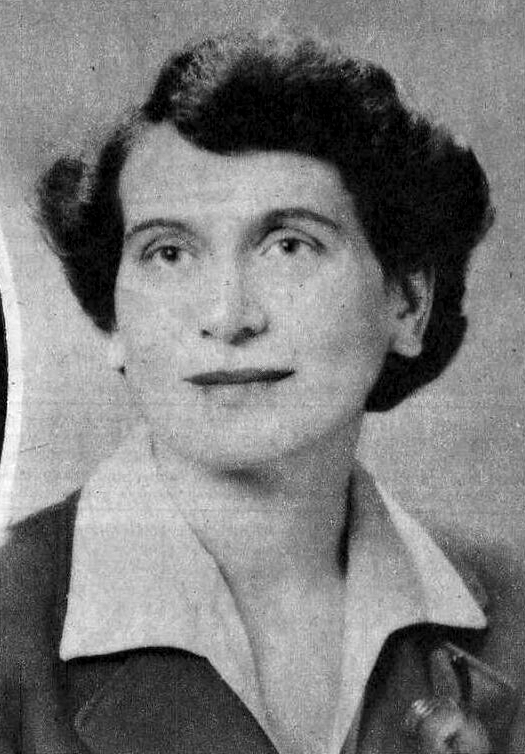
Willen c. 1943

Pearl Willen (January 2, 1904 – 1968) was a prominent American activist who dedicated her life to the promotion of education and democracy. Having begun her professional life as a social worker, Willen was particularly committed to causes supporting women, children and union workers. She was deeply engaged in the Liberal Party of New York, and served as President of the National Council of Jewish Women from 1963 to 1967.

== Early life and education ==
Born Pearl Larner on January 2, 1904, Willen was the oldest child of Sarah and Mayer Larner. She grew up in St. Louis, Illinois, alongside her four younger brothers and younger sister. Willen earned her Bachelor’s Degree from Washington University in St. Louis, and later met her husband, Joseph Willen (1897-1985), executive vice president of the Federation of Jewish Philanthropies, in 1925, while pursuing a graduate degree in social work in New York. The couple had two children, Paul and Deborah. Paul Willen grew up to become a prominent New York City architect. Deborah, who later became Deborah Meier, became an educator, author, and advocate for public education reform. In 1935, Pearl Willen earned a master's degree from Columbia University.

== Career ==
Willen began her career in service in 1927 at the Foster Home Bureau in New York, where she was employed as a caseworker. Willen was an active member of the Parent Education Council located in Westchester, NY, as well as several organizations that advocated for improvements in workers’ quality of life, including the Labor Education Service, the executive board Union for Democratic Action, and the Southern Camp of Pioneer Youth, a camp for the children of union workers for which she served as chair. Willen was also instrumental in the organization of the Southern School for Workers, which aimed to improve the literacy of union workers.

In addition to her involvement in activist organizations, Willen also held a strong political presence in the American Liberal Party, acting as both chair of the party’s women’s division and vice chair of its State Administrative Committee. Willen unsuccessfully ran for New York City Council in 1943.

Undeterred by her loss, Willen traveled to Europe in 1951 after having been selected by the State Department as one of a panel of American women sent to study organizational life in West Germany. Following this trip, Willen’s career became more international in scope. The activist led programs promoting human rights and social welfare for three years under the International Council of Jewish Women, and was later chosen to be the organization’s President. Willen made trips throughout Europe, Asia and South America in order to teach leadership skills to Jewish women.

Additionally, Willen served on the board of governors of both the American Red Cross and the Hebrew University in Jerusalem, as well as the board of directors of the American Friends of the Hebrew University. In 1963, she was photographed among a group of politically influential women who stood beside President John F. Kennedy as he signed the Equal Pay Act.

== Death ==
In 1968, Willen was killed in a car accident while on a safari in Africa.
