= List of members of the League of American Writers =

The League of American Writers was a so-called "mass organization" initiated by the Communist Party USA (CPUSA) in 1935 and terminated in January 1943. A small and elite organization, the League included professional novelists, playwrights, poets, journalists, and literary critics. Despite the prominent role of the CPUSA in the establishment and control of the League, one should not make the assumption that any particular individual on this list was a "Communist," however. The members of the League of American Writers ranged from active and open Communist Party members to "fellow travelers" who consciously followed the party's political line without being subject to the formal discipline of party membership to individuals who merely sympathized with one or another broad policy objective being touted by the League, such as stopping the spread of fascism or supporting the cause of the Spanish Republic in the Spanish Civil War. Most members belonged to the latter group.

The office of the League of American Writers was burglarized shortly before the National Council voted to terminate the organization in January 1943 and its membership list was taken. This page is a list of members of the League of American Writers compiled and published by Franklin Folsom, Executive Secretary for five of the seven years of the League's existence. Folsom worked from published League Bulletins, organizational minutes, partial membership lists obtained from the Federal Bureau of Investigation and the House Committee on Un-American Activities, as cross-checked to a similar list compiled by Tom Wolfe for his doctoral dissertation. This list follows that published as Appendix A of Folsom's 1994 memoir.

== Membership list ==
=== A ===
- Cyrilly Abels
- Marcel Acier
- Louis Adamic (1899–1951)
- Frederic L. Adams
- Léonie Adams (1899–1988)
- Irving Adler (1913- )
- James Agee (1909–1955)
- Conrad Aiken (1889–1973)
- George Sumner Albee (1905–1964)
- Sidney S. Alberts
- Rhoda Truax Aldrich
- Sidney Alexander
- Benjamin Algase
- Nelson Algren (1909–1981)
- Lewis Allan (1903–1986)
- William Alland (1916–1997)
- James S. Allen (1906–1991)
- Jay Allen (1900–1972)
- Sally Elliot Allen
- Sarah Van Alstyne Allen
- Henry Alsberg
- George Ames (1910–?)
- Lou Amster (1910–1993)
- A.E. Anderson
- Maxwell Anderson (1888–1959)
- Sherwood Anderson (1876–1941)
- Ruth Olive Angel
- Charles Angoff (1902–1979)
- Ruth Nanda Anshen
- Katharine Anthony (1877–1965)
- Benjamin Appel (1908–1977)
- Helen Appleton
- Herbert Aptheker (1915–2003)
- Louis Aragon (1897–1982)
- Arthur Arent (1904–1972)
- Eugene Armfeld
- Arnold B. Armstrong
- Louise V. Armstrong
- Thurman Arnold (1891–1969)
- Newton Arvin (1900–1963)
- Nathan Asch (1902–1964)
- Sholem Asch (1880–1957)
- Harriette Ashbrook (1898–1946)
- George Asness
- Leopold Atlas (1907–1954)
- W. H. Auden (1907–1973)
- Nathan Ausubel (1898–1986)

=== B ===
- Sanora Babb (1907–2005)
- Georgia Backus (1900–1983)
- Joe Baich
- J.S. Balch
- Robert Lee Baker
- James Baldwin (1924–1987)
- Emery Balint
- Jenny Ballou
- Margaret Culkin Banning (1891–1982)
- Wayne Barker
- Samuel Barlow (1892–1982)
- Will Barnet
- John D. Barry (1866–1942)
- Dorothy Baruch
- Emjo Basshe (1900–1939)
- Hamilton Basso (1904–1969)
- Ralph Bates
- Marie Baumer
- Joseph Warren Beach (1880–1957)
- Carleton Beals (1893–1979)
- Beril Becker
- Florence Becker Lennon (1895–1984)
- Nancy Bedford-Jones
- Albert Bein
- Nicholas Bela
- Cedric Belfrage (1904–1990)
- Ben Belitt (1911–2003)
- Emile Beliveau
- Thomas Bell (1903–1961)
- Mair José Benardete (1885–1989)
- Robert C. Benchley (1889–1945)
- M. R. Bendiner
- Agnes E. Benedict (1889–1950)
- Eduard Beneš (1884–1948)
- William Rose Benét (1886–1950)
- Ben Bengal
- Nora Benjamin (1899–1988)
- Milly Bennett (1909–1989)
- Ria Romilly Benson
- Theodore Bentley
- Rion Leonardo Bercovici (1903–1976)
- José Bergamín
- Josef Berger (1903–1971)
- Helen Bergovoy
- Martin Berkeley
- Harold Berman
- Lionel Berman (1906–1968)
- Lawrence Bernard (1905–1968)
- Aline Bernstein (1881–1955)
- Joseph Bernstein (1908–1975)
- Samuel Bernstein (1905–1977)
- Alvah Bessie (1904–1985)
- Simon Bessie
- A. I. Bezzerides (1908–2007)
- Herbert Biberman (1900–1971)
- Karl Billinger (1902–1979)
- Anthony Bimba (1894–1982)
- Louis P. Birk
- Joran Birkeland
- John Peale Bishop (1892–1944)
- Beatrice Bisno
- Edwin Bjorkman (1866–1951)
- Algernon D. Black
- Jean Fergusson Black
- Ivan Black (1904–1979)
- Clarice Blake
- Eleanor Blake
- Ellen Blake
- William J. Blake (1894–1968)
- Henry Blankfort, Jr.
- Louise Blankfort
- Michael Blankfort (1907–1982)
- Marc Blitzstein (1905–1964)
- Bruce Bliven (1889–1977)
- Ernst Bloch (1885–1977)
- Anita Block (1882–1967)
- Pauline Bloom
- Frederick A. Blossom (1878–1974)
- Albert E. Blumberg
- Maxwell Bodenheim (1893–1954)
- Harold A. Boner (1904–1971)
- Stephen Bonsal (1865–1951)
- Robert O. Boothe
- Allen Boretz (1900–1986)
- G. A. Borgese
- B. A. Botkin (1901–1975)
- Louis Boudin (1874–1952)
- Florence W. Bowers
- Herman Boxer
- Ruth Fitch Boyd
- Thomas Boyd (1898–1935)
- Polly Boyden
- Richard Owen Boyer (1903–1973)
- John Boylan
- Ernest Brace
- Robert A. Brady
- Moe Bragin (1900–1986)
- Millen Brand (1906–1980)
- Richard Bransten (1906–1955)
- Mort Braus
- Bertolt Brecht (1898–1956)
- Harvey Bresler
- Bessie Breuer (1893–1975)
- Dorothy Brewster (1883–1975)
- Robert Stephen Briffault (1876–1948)
- John Bright
- Ayers Brinser
- Alter Brody
- Anne Bromberger
- Louis Broomfield (1896–1956)
- J. Bronowski (1908–1974)
- Ernest Brooks
- Jerome E. Brooks (1895–1983)
- Marie Short Brooks
- Phillip Brooks (1899–1975)
- Van Wyck Brooks (1886–1963)
- Heywood Broun (1888–1939)
- Julie Brousseau
- Earl Browder (1891–1973)
- Bob Brown
- Dee Brown (1908–2002)
- John Mason Brown (1900–1969)
- Sterling A. Brown (1901–1989)
- Violet Brown
- Waldo R. Browne
- Herbert Bruncken (1896-unknown)
- Harold Buchman
- Sidney Buchman (1902–1975)
- Nathaniel Buchwald
- Pearl S. Buck (1892–1973)
- Henrietta Buckmaster (1909–1983)
- Harriet F. Bunn
- Edwin Berry Burgum (1894–1979)
- Fielding Burke (1869–1968)
- Kenneth Burke (1897–1993)
- Whitney Ewing Burnett (1899–1973)
- Paul Burns
- Stanley Burnshaw (1906–2005)
- Norman Burnside
- Jane Burr
- Struthers Burt
- Paul Burton-Mercur
- Anthony Buttietta
- Harold Witter Bynner (1881–1968)

=== C ===
- Harriet Cahn
- Erskine Caldwell (1903–1987)
- Alan Calmer
- Victor Campbell
- Wallace Campbell
- Martha Campion
- Robert Cantwell (1908–1978)
- Harry Carlisle (1910–1966)
- Helen Grace Carlisle
- Walter Carmon
- Cecilio J. Carnicio
- Marjorie Barth Carpenter
- Robert Carse (1902–1971)
- Saul Carson
- Vera Caspary (1904–1987)
- Molly Castle
- John Chamberlain (1904–1995)
- Alene Dalton Chapin (1915–1986)
- Katherine Garrison Chapin (1891–1978)
- John Cheever (1912–1982)
- Ralph Cheney
- Haakon Chevalier (1901–1985)
- Chao-Ting Chi
- Marquis W. Childs (1903–1990)
- Richard S. Childs
- Edward Chodorov (1904–1988)
- Jerome Chodorv
- Mady Christians (1892–1951)
- Henry E. Christman (1906–1980)
- Stoyan Christowe
- Eleanor Clark (1913–1996)
- Maurice Clark
- Faith Clarke
- Eugene Clay
- Albert Edward Clements
- Harold Clurman (1901–1980)
- Robert M. Coates (1897–1973)
- Humphrey Cobb (1899–1944)
- Lee J. Cobb (1911–1976)
- Stanton A. Coblentz (1896–1982)
- Lester Cohen (1901–1963)
- Charles E. Colahan
- Merle Colby (1902–1969)
- Lester Cole (1904–1985)
- Eugene Colehan
- Lloyd Collins
- Richard J. Collins
- Louis Colman (1902–1969)
- David Commons
- Groff Conklin (1904–1968)
- Marc Connelly (1890–1980)
- Harry Conover
- Ellen Conried
- Jack Conroy (1899–1990)
- Aaron Copland (1900–1990)
- Seymour A. Copstein
- Kathryn Coe Cordell
- Lewis Corey (1892–1953)
- Paul Corey (1903–1993)
- Norman Corwin
- George S. Counts (1889–1974)
- Malcolm Cowley (1898–1989)
- Marian Cox (1898–1983)
- Sidney Cox
- Harold Coy
- C. Ward Crampton
- Bruce Crawford
- Ruth Elizabeth Crawford
- Kyle Crichton (1896–1960)
- Alexander L. Crosby (1906–1980)
- Caresse Crosby (1892–1970)
- Ken Crossen
- Countee Cullen (1903–1946)
- William Cunningham
- Dale Curran
- Clifton Cuthbert
- Philip Cuthbert

=== D ===
- Edward Dahlberg (1900–1977)
- David Daiches (1912–2005)
- James Daly (1918–1978)
- Robert D'Ambry
- Henry Wadsworth Longfellow Dana (1881–1950)
- George Dangerfield (1904–1986)
- Jerry Danzig
- Danny Dare (1905–1996)
- Marcia Davenport (1903–1996)
- Edward David
- Joy Davidman (1915–1960)
- Frank Davis
- Frank Marshall Davis (1905–1987)
- George Davis
- Horace Bancroft Davis
- Jerome Davis (1891–1979)
- Lavinia Riker Davis
- Robert A. Davis
- Robert Gorham Davis
- Stuart Davis (1894–1964)
- Edward Davison (1898–1971)
- Paul de Kruif (1890–1971)
- Merrill Denison (1893–1975)
- Leon Dennen
- August Derleth (1909–1971)
- Alvara DeSilva
- Margo DeSilva
- Karl William Detzer (1891–1987)
- Albert Deutsch
- Babette Deutsch (1895–1982)
- Peter De Vries (1910–1993)
- Gertrude Diamont
- Pietro di Donato (1911–1991)
- Frieda Meredith Dietz
- George Dillon (1906–1968)
- Howard Dimsdale
- Loren Disney
- Martha Dodd (1908–1990)
- William E. Dodd, Jr.
- James Dombrowski (1897–1983)
- Ambrogio Donini
- Edward Donahoe
- John Dos Passos (1896–1970)
- Clifford Dowdey (1904–1979)
- Olin Downes (1886–1955)
- Muriel Draper (1886–1952)
- Theodore Draper (1912–2006)
- Theodore Dreiser (1871–1945)
- John Drury (1898–1972)
- James Dugan (1912–1967)
- John Dunn
- Robert Dunn (1877–1955)
- Philip Dunne (1908–1992)
- F. W. Dupee (1904–1979)
- Walter Duranty (1884–1957)
- Arnaud d'Usseau (1916–1990)
- Jay du Von

=== E ===
- Horace Ainsworth
- Richard Eberhart (1904–2005)
- Irwin Edman (1896–1954)
- David Efron
- Lajor Egri (1888–1967)
- Leonard Ehrlich
- Emilio Ehricos
- Albert Einstein (1879–1955)
- Emanuel Eisenberg
- Alfred Eisner
- Harold Elby
- Edward Eliscu (1902–1998)
- Stella Eliscu
- Peter Ellis
- Ralph Ellison (1914–1994)
- Mary Elting
- Cyril Endfield (1914–1995)
- Guy Endore (1901–1971)
- Fannie Engle
- Paul Engle (1908–1991)
- H. C. Engelbrecht
- Stuart Engstrand (1904–1955)
- Angna Enters (1907–1989)
- Julius J. Epstein (1909–2000)
- Philip G. Epstein (1909–1952)
- Nathan Essell
- Renie Eulenburg-Weiner
- Mary Cummings Eudy (1871–1952)
- William Everts (1902–1988)
- Frederic Ewen (1899–1988)

=== F ===
- Beatrice Faber
- Clifton Fadiman (1904–1999)
- Henry Pratt Fairchild (1880–1956)
- Edward Falkowski (1901–1984)
- John Fante (1911–1983)
- Francis Edward Faragoh
- Finis Farr (1904–1982)
- James T. Farrell (1904–1979)
- Howard Fast (1914–2003)
- Arthur Huff Fauset (1899–1983)
- Jessie Redmon Fauset (1884–1961)
- Franklin Fearing (1892–1962)
- Kenneth Fearing (1902–1961)
- Leon Feinberg
- I.F. Stone (1907–1989)
- David Fenwick
- Edward Fenwick
- Otis Ferguson (1907–1943)
- Harvey Fergusson (1890–1971)
- Robert Ferrari
- Mathild Ferro
- Theodore E. Ferro
- Lion Feuchtwanger (1884–1958)
- Arthur Davison Ficke (1883–1945)
- Ben Field (US author) (1900–1986)
- Frederick Vanderbilt Field (1905–2000)
- Kathleen Field
- Sarah Bard Field (1883–1974)
- Allen A. Fields
- Joseph A. Fields (1895–1966)
- Irving Fineman
- Maxine Finsterwald
- Bruno Fischer (1908–1992)
- Louis Fischer (1896–1970)
- Marjorie Fischer (1903–1961)
- Dorothy Canfield Fisher (1879–1958)
- Vardis Fischer (1895–1968)
- Dudley Fitts (1903–1968)
- Robert Fitzgerald (1910–1985)
- Grace Hodgson Flandrau
- Rose E. Flanell
- Hildegarde Flanner (1899–1987)
- Charles Flato (1908–1984)
- Ethel Fleming
- John Gould Fletcher (1886–1950)
- Eleanor Flexner (1908–1995)
- Angel Flores
- William Floyd (1871–1943)
- Martha Foley (1897–1977)
- Franklin Folsom
- Betsy Foote
- Diana Forbes-Robertson
- Charles Henri Ford
- Fanya Foss
- Orline Dorman Foster
- William Z. Foster (1881–1961)
- Michael Fraenkel (1896–1957)
- Bernhard Frank
- Waldo David Frank (1889–1967)
- Erich Franzen
- Frank S. Freeman
- Ira Henry Freeman
- Joseph Freeman (1897–1965)
- Emily Freidkin
- Robert Frost (1874–1963)
- Daniel Fuchs (1909–1993)
- Sol Funaroff (1911–1942)
- Julian Funt

=== G ===
- Joseph Gaer (1893–1946)
- Wanda Gág (1893–1946)
- Lewis Galantiere
- Lewis Gannett (1891–1966)
- Sender Garlin (1902–1999)
- Troy Garrison
- Samuel Gaspar
- John W. Gassner (1903–1967)
- Michael Gates
- Mary Gawthorpe (1881–1973)
- Virgil Geddes (1897–1989)
- Lawrence Gellert (1898-c. 1979)
- Martha Gellhorn (1908–1998)
- Manfred Georg
- Thomas Gerson
- Robert Gessner (1907–1968)
- Sheridan Gibney (1904–1988)
- Elsa Gidlow (1898–1986)
- Helen Earle Gilberta
- Leland Gilbert
- Mercedes Gilbert (1894–1952)
- Lauren Gilfillan (1909–1978)
- Lillian Barnard Gilkes
- Strickland Gilliland
- Mildred Gilman
- Arnold Gingrich (1903–1976)
- Louis Ginsberg
- Dorothy Glaser
- Baruch Glasman
- Charles Glenn
- Lillian G. Glenn
- H. H. Glintenkamp
- Alexander Godin
- Michael Gold (1894–1967)
- David A. Goldberg
- Nan Golden
- Beatrice Goldsmith
- Morton S. Goldstein
- Lawrence A. Goldston
- Joseph Gollomb (1881–1950)
- Manuel Gomez (1895–1950)
- Henry Goodman
- Francis Goodrich
- Murray Goodwin
- Don Gordon (1911–1974)
- Eugene Gordon (1891–1974)
- Ruth Gordon (1896–1985)
- Quentin P. Gore
- Jay Gorney (1894–1990)
- Harry Gottlieb (1895–1993)
- James Gow (1908–1952)
- Emmett Gowen
- Isacque Graeber (1905–1984)
- Oskar Maria Graf (1894–1967)
- Edith Grafton
- Samuel Grafton
- Harry Granick
- Morton Grant
- Mark Graubard
- James Gray (1899–1984)
- Bernard Grebanier (1903–1977)
- Johnny Green (1908–1989)
- Sara Greenhill
- Richard Greenleaf
- David Charles Greenwood
- Horace Gregory (1898–1982)
- William Lindsay Gresham (1909–1962)
- Jay Greulich
- Hilda Growald
- Antoni Groniwicz
- Louis Grudin (1898–1993)
- Martha Gruening
- Leo Grulio
- Bernhard G. Guerney (1894–1979)
- Frances Gunther
- John Gunther (1901–1970)
- Ramon Guthrie (1896–1973)
- Norbert Guterman (1900–1984)

=== H ===
- Louis Hacker (1899–1987)
- Albert Hackett (1900–1995)
- Carl Haessler (1888–1972)
- J. B. S. Haldane (1892–1964)
- Emanuel Haldeman-Julius (1889–1951)
- Stuart Halden
- Hope Hale
- Mauritz A. Hallgren (1899–1956)
- Albert Halper (1904–1984)
- Maurice Halperin (1906–1995)
- Florence Hamilton
- Dashiell Hammett (1894–1961)
- Frederic Hand
- John Handcos
- Harry Hansen (1884–1977)
- Merlin Hansen
- Louis Harap (1904–1998)
- E. Y. Harburg (1896–1981)
- Rachel Harlen
- Jessie Fauset Harris (1882–1961)
- M. Tjader Harris
- Reed Harris (1909–1982)
- Alan Harrison
- W. E. Harrison
- Robert Harron
- Henry Hart (1903–1990)
- Marian Hart (1892–1940)
- Moss Hart (1904–1961)
- Walter Hart (1906–1973)
- Gwendolen Haste
- Clarence Hathaway (1892–1963)
- Walter Havighurst (1901–1994)
- Elizabeth Hawes (1903–1971)
- Willard Hawkins
- Edith Garrigues Hawthorne
- Alfred Hayes (1911–1985)
- Howard Hays
- Hofman Reynolds Hays (1904–1980)
- David Hedley
- Ethel McCall Head
- Nora Helgren
- George S. Hellman
- Lillian Hellman (1905–1984)
- Ernest Hemingway (1898–1961)
- Leon Srabian Herald
- Josephine Herbst (1897–1969)
- Angelo Herndon (1913–1997)
- Robert Herrick (1868–1938)
- John Herrmann (1900–1959)
- Melville J. Herskovits (1895–1963)
- David Hertz
- Allan Hewitt
- DuBose Heyward (1885–1940)
- Granville Hicks (1901–1982)
- James Hill (1916–2001)
- Norman E. Himes
- Alfred Hirsch
- Peretz Hirschbein (1880–1948)
- Wilder Hobson (1906–1965)
- Edward Hodes
- Carroll Hollister
- Eugene C. Holmes
- Hope Holway
- Milton Howard
- Sidney Howard (1891–1939)
- Quincy Howe (1900–1977)
- Leo Huberman (1903–1968)
- Warren C. Huddlestone
- B. W. Huebsch
- Edward Huebsch
- Harriet Hughes
- Langston Hughes (1902–1967)
- Rolfe Humphries (1894–1969)
- Alice Riggs Hunt (1884–1974)
- Ian McLellan Hunter
- Herman Hurlbut
- Fannie Hurst (1899–1968)
- Leo T. Hurwitz
- John Marcellus Huston (1906–1987)
- Grace Hutchins (1885–1969)

=== I ===
- Agatha Illes
- Boris Ingster
- Theodore Irwin
- Sulamith Ish-Kishor (1896–1977)
- Eitaro Ishigaki
- Joris Ivens (1898–1989)

=== J ===
- Aunt Molly Jackson (1880–1960)
- Gardner Jackson
- Lewis Jacobs (1904–1997)
- Eli Jaffe
- Eugne Jaffe
- Henry Jaffe
- Bernard Jaffee
- Paul Jarrico (1915–1997)
- Phil Jasper
- Joseph Jastrow
- Verne Jay
- V.J. Jerome
- Eugene Joffe
- Orrick Johns
- Edgar Johnson (1901-)
- Gail Johnson
- James Weldon Johnson
- Josephine Winslow Johnson
- Nunnally Johnson
- Oakley Johnson
- Winifred Johnston
- George Vedder Jones
- Hays Jones
- Nancy Bedford Jones

=== K ===
- Gordon Kahn (1902–1962)
- Arthur Kallet (1902–1972)
- H.V. Kaltenborn (1878–1965)
- Morris Kamman
- Aben Kandel
- Michael Kanin
- Jean Karsavina (1908–1992)
- David Kats
- Younghill Kang
- Philip Keeney (1891–1962)

=== M ===
- Archibald MacLeish
- Arthur Miller

=== O ===
- Shaemas O'Sheel

=== P ===
- Myra Page

=== R ===
- Sonia Raiziss
- Wellington Roe

=== S ===
- Vincent Sheean
- John Steinbeck
- I. F. Stone

=== T ===
- Alexander Trachtenberg
- Lawrence Treat

=== U ===
- Louis Untermeyer

== See also ==
- League of American Writers
