= William Weinstone =

American communist politician and labor leader (1897–1985)

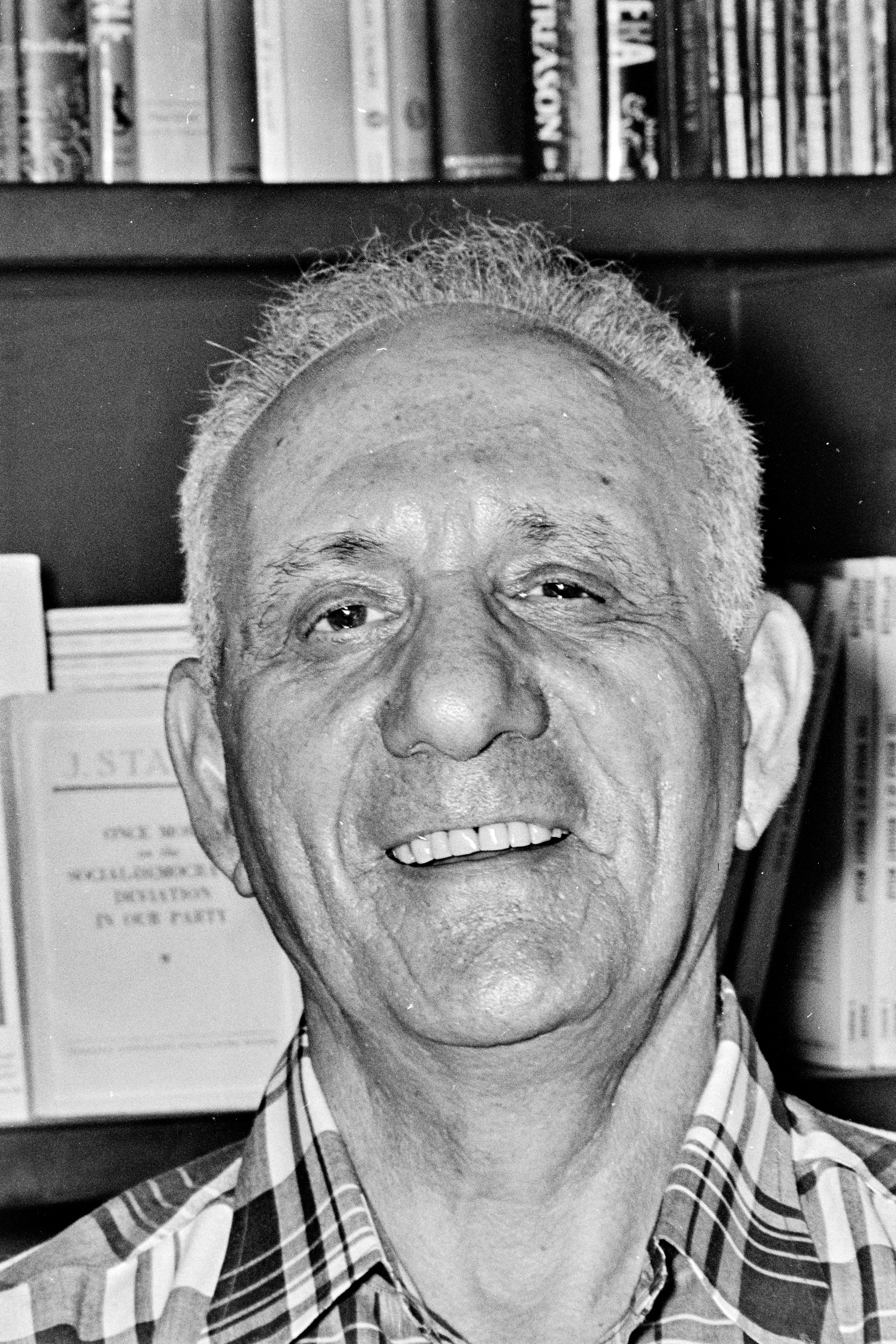
- Weinstone in 1968

Executive Secretary of the Communist Party of America
- In office October 15, 1921 – February 22, 1922
- Preceded by: L. E. Katterfeld
- Succeeded by: Jay Lovestone

Personal details
- Born: December 15, 1897 Vilna, Vilna Governorate, Russian Empire
- Died: October 22, 1985 (aged 87) New York City, U.S.
- Party: Socialist (1915–1919); Communist (after 1919)
- Other political affiliations: Workers (1921–1927)
- Spouse(s): Gertrude Haessler; Monette Solataroff
- Children: 3
- Relatives: Carl Haessler (brother-in-law)
- Education: City College of New York

William Wolf Weinstone (December 15, 1897 – October 22, 1985) was an American Communist politician and labor leader. Weinstone served as Executive Secretary of the unified Communist Party of America, the forerunner of today's Communist Party USA, from October 1921 to February 1922, and was an important figure in the party's activities among the auto workers of Detroit during the 1930s.

== Background ==
William Weinstone was born in Vilnius (then a part of the Vilna Governorate in the Russian Empire) on December 15, 1897. He was the son of Jewish parents who brought him to the United States to escape that nation's pervasive antisemitism during the late Tsarist period. His original surname was "Weinstein", which he Americanized when he was older.

Weinstone grew up in the Brownsville neighborhood of Brooklyn, New York and attended City College. By 1914, he was active in the labor and socialist movements, joining the Socialist Party of America in 1915. He served in the U.S. Navy from 1918 to 1919.

== Career ==
=== Early years ===
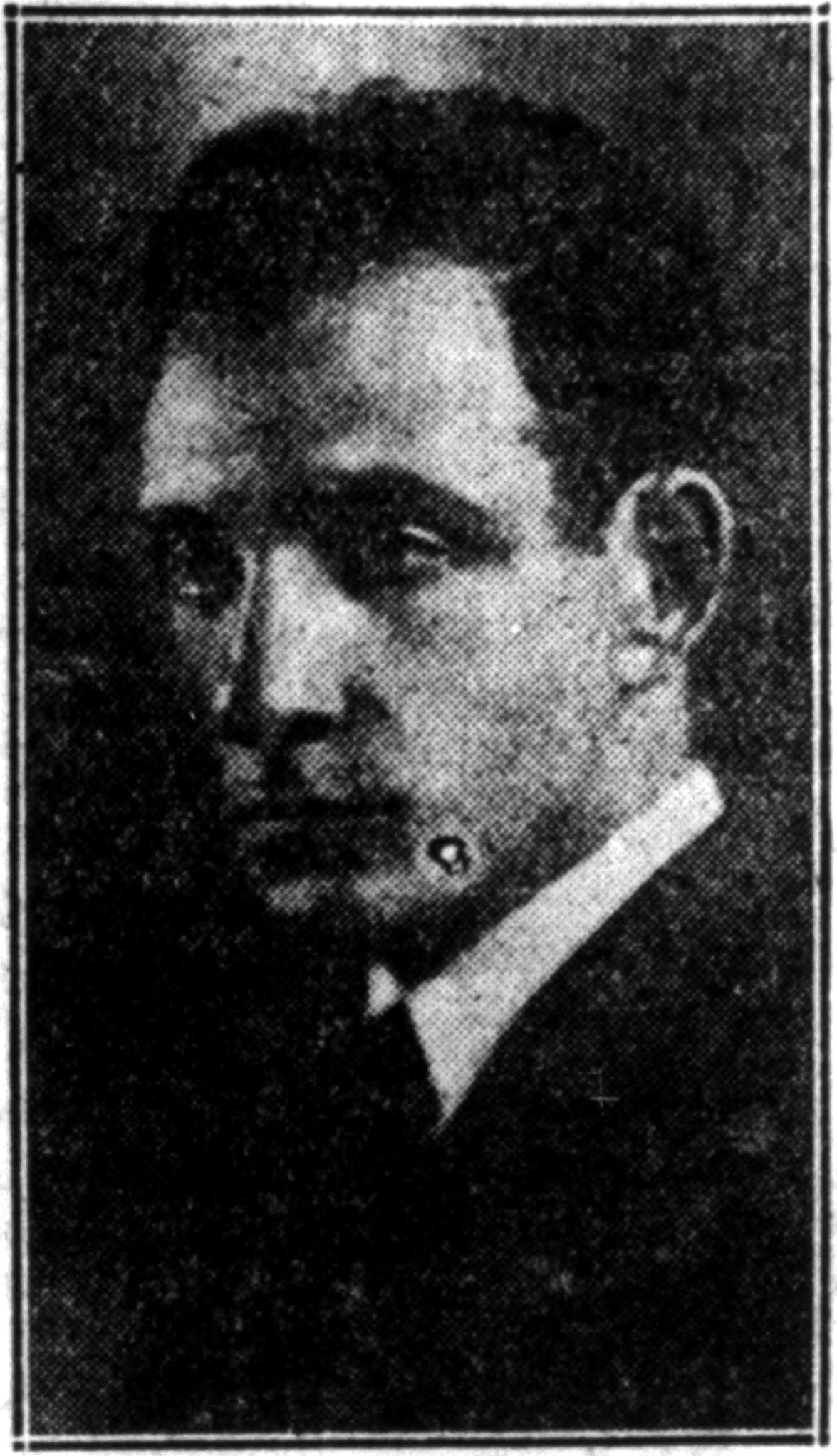
Weinstone c. 1924

In June 1919, Weinstone was elected as an alternate delegate to the Left Wing National Conference held in New York City, at which he was seated to replace a regular delegate on the last day of the gathering.

Weinstone was elected as a delegate to the founding convention of the Communist Party of America, called to order in Chicago on September 1, 1919.

During the first years of the 1920s, the Communist Party of America was forced underground by the mass operation of the US Department of Justice remembered as the Palmer Raids. During this interval, Weinstone served as Executive Secretary of the secret party organization from October 15, 1921, to February 22, 1922, under the pseudonym "G. Lewis."

In the summer of 1929, following the removal of Jay Lovestone and Benjamin Gitlow from the leadership of the Communist Party, Weinstone was added to the ranks of a new collective leadership called the Secretariat. Although he had aspirations of permanent leadership, Weinstone was ultimately unable to retain the top leadership, which soon fell to Earl Browder, a longtime factional rival.

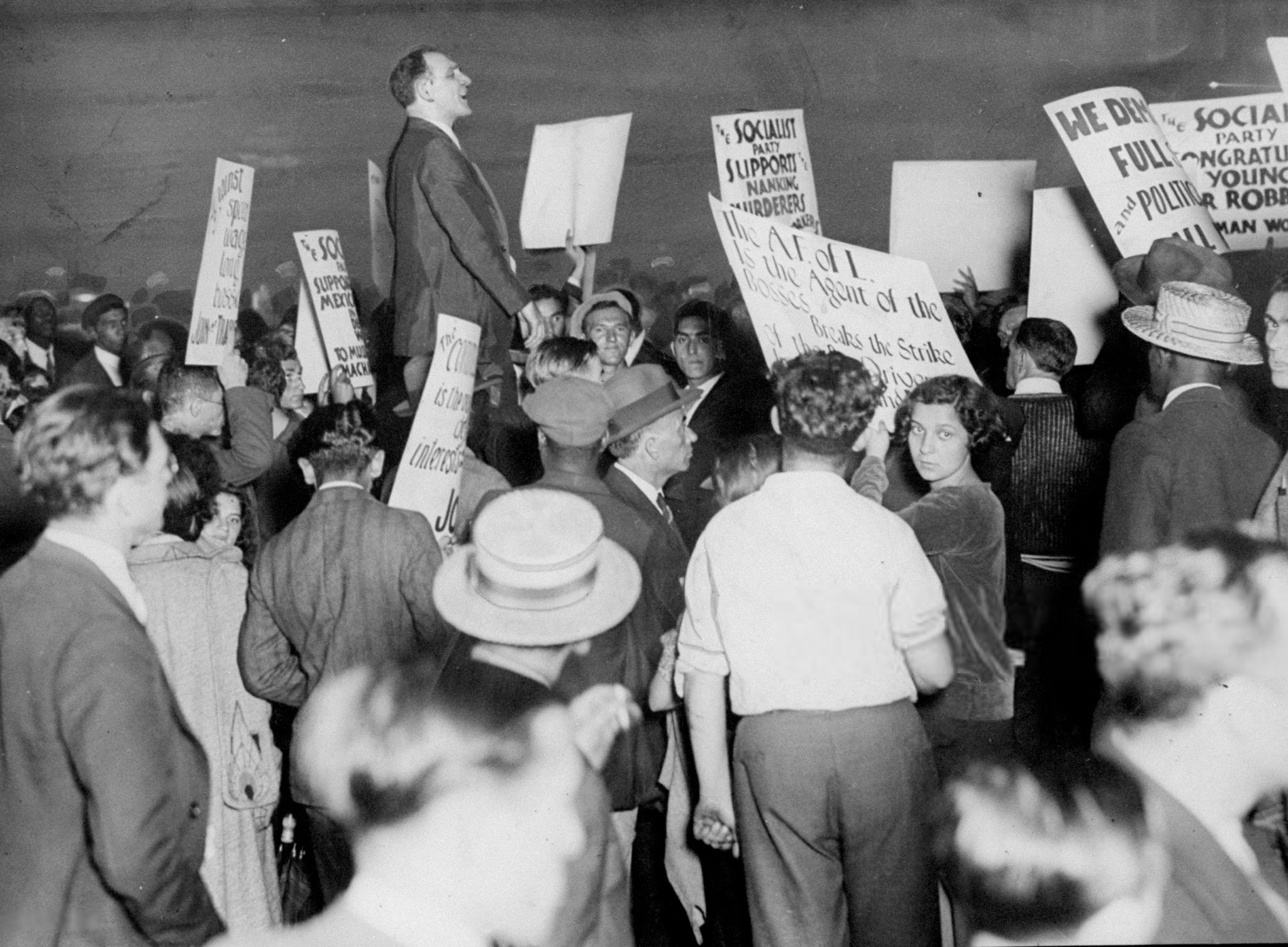
Weinstone gives a speech to a crowd at a Communist meeting at 130th Street and Lenox Avenue in Manhattan, New York, September 13, 1929

In 1929, Weinstone ran for Mayor of New York City. Following the campaign, Weinstone was selected by the Communist Party as its representative to the Executive Committee of the Communist International in Moscow, a post which he occupied until 1931. On January 15, 1931, William Albertson was to serve as secretary of a "Provisional Anti-War Youth Committee" of New York State to hold a rally for a Liebknecht Memorial and Anti-War Demonstration at the Star Casono at Park Avenue and 117 Street in Manhattan; CPUSA executive Weinstone and YCL leader Gil Green were to attend.

Weinstone served as editor of the Daily Worker from 1931 to 1932. He ran for U.S. Senate in 1932.

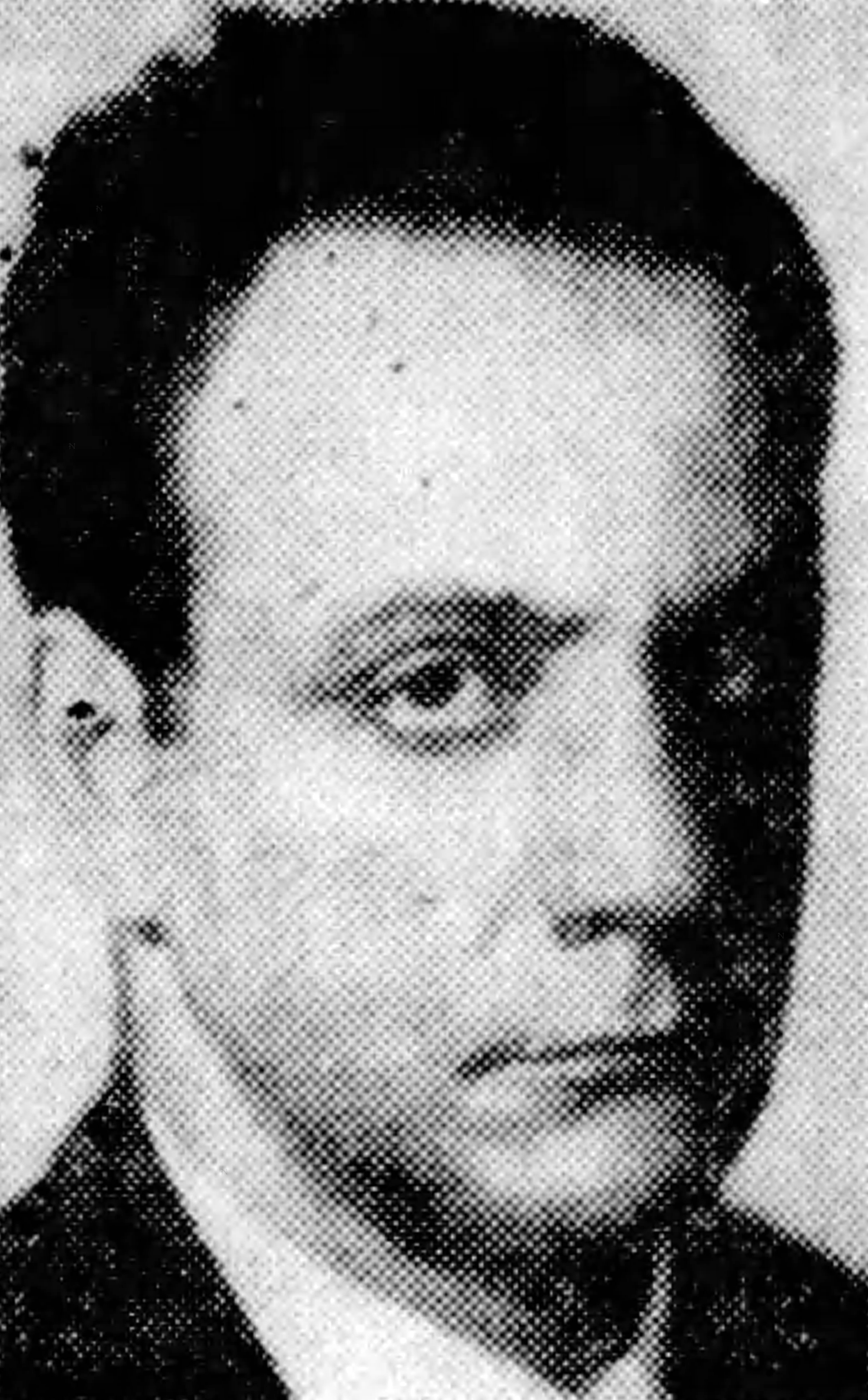
Weinstone c. 1932

Weinstone served as secretary of the Michigan district of the Communist Party from 1934 to 1938, during a wave of Great Depression union activity. He played a significant role in the founding of the United Auto Workers Union (UAW) in May 1935, pressing the unionized workers to make use of the sit-down strike, a tactic first employed by the Industrial Workers of the World union. The union's wave of successful sit-down strikes culminated in the Flint Sit-Down Strike of 1936–1937, in which the striking UAW workers occupied several General Motors plants for over forty days – repelling the efforts of the police and National Guard to drive them from the auto plant's premises.

A member of the Central Executive Committee of the Communist Party during the same period, Weinstone concurrently worked on the party's cause on behalf of oppressed African Americans in the segregated southern states. Writing for such communist publications as The International Communist, he was a strong champion of the defense of the falsely-accused Scottsboro Boys, whose successful legal defense was organized by the Communist-funded International Labor Defense, as was the famous case of young African American organizer Angelo Herndon.

In 1938, Weinstone was named Director of the New York Workers School, the Communist Party's ideological training school located on the Lower East Side of Manhattan. He served in that role until 1944.

=== Later years ===
Still publishing material for the communist cause into the twilight of his life, Winestone, together with Theodore Bassett and Philip A. Bart, was also co-editor of Highlights of a Fighting History: 60 Years of the Communist Party, USA, a broad selection of speeches, essays, and documents from the party's history; his recollection of organizing work during the autoworkers' sit-down strike was published in The Great Sit-Down Strike, a work produced by the party-organized Workers Library Publishers in 1937.

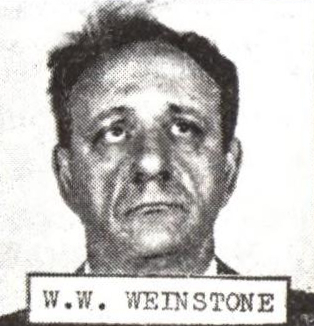
Weinstone's FBI mugshot, 1951

In 1953, Weinstone and 12 other communist leaders were convicted in Federal District Court in Manhattan under the Smith Act of conspiracy to advocate the violent overthrow of the government. His role in the conspiracy was the writing of two newspaper articles, in 1948 and 1950, reviewing the party's educational work and plans to raise membership. He served two years in a Federal prison and was fined $4,000. Weinstone remained a loyalist to the Communist Party throughout his entire life, remaining in the organization even after its bitter factional struggle of 1956 to 1958, brought about by the so-called "Secret Speech" of Nikita Khrushchev in February 1956 and the Soviet invasion of Hungary in November 1956.

In 1959, Weinstone was among the first American communists to visit the Soviet Union again, following a protracted break in direct contacts with the outside world. Weinstone traveled at that time without portfolio and was reported by high-ranking party member and FBI informant Morris Childs to have been considering seeking employment and staying in the USSR on a long-term basis. Childs persuaded Weinstone to return to the United States, however, and he returned to America on November 1, 1959.

== Personal and death ==
Weinstone married Gertrude Haessler, sister of Carl Haessler, who headed the Federated Press. He later remarried with Monette Solataroff. He had three daughters.

Weinstone died at LaGuardia Hospital in Queens, New York on October 22, 1985.

== Legacy ==
Weinstone's papers reside with the Manuscript Division of the Library of Congress in Washington.

Weinstone was immortalized in film as one of the "witnesses" in Warren Beatty's film, Reds, sharing his personal recollections of radical journalist John Reed and Reed's wife, Louise Bryant.

== Works ==
- How the Auto Workers Won. (with William Z Foster) New York: The Daily Worker, 1937.
- The Great Sit-down Strike. New York: Workers Library Pub., 1937.
- Factionalism — The Enemy of the Auto Workers. (with Boleslaw Gebert) Detroit, Communist Party of Michigan 1938.
- The Case against David Dubinsky. New York: New Century Publishers, 1946
- The Atom Bomb and You. New York: New Century Publishers, 1950.
- Our Generation Will Not Be Silent: Statement of the Labor Youth League in Answer to the Attorney General's Charges under the McCarran Act. New York: The League, 1953.
- Against Opportunism: For a Marxist-Leninist, Vanguard Party of the American Working Class. New York: Waterfront Section, Communist Party, U.S.A., 1956.
- Study Outline on the History of the Communist Party, USA. New York: National Education Dept., Communist Party, U.S.A., 1969.
