= Edward Huebsch =

20th-Century American blacklisted screenwriter

- Born: Eduárd Hubsch III; February 20, 1914; New York City
- Died: July 7, 1982 (aged 68); Los Angeles
- Citizenship: American
- Relatives: B. W. Huebsch (Viking Press)
- Writing career
- Genre: Motion picture screen writer
- Literary movement: Hollywood blacklist

Edward Huebsch, AKA "Eddie Huebsch" and "Ed Huebsch," (1914–1982) was a 20th-century American Communist screenwriter whose career was cut short by the Hollywood blacklist.

== Background ==
Edward Huebsch was born on February 20, 1914, in New York City.

== Career ==
In 1942 following the December 1941 Japanese attack on Pearl Harbor, Huebsch volunteered to serve in the United States Army.

Huebsch moved to Los Angeles in 1946 after receiving his discharge and spending some time with family in New York.

=== Screenwriter ===
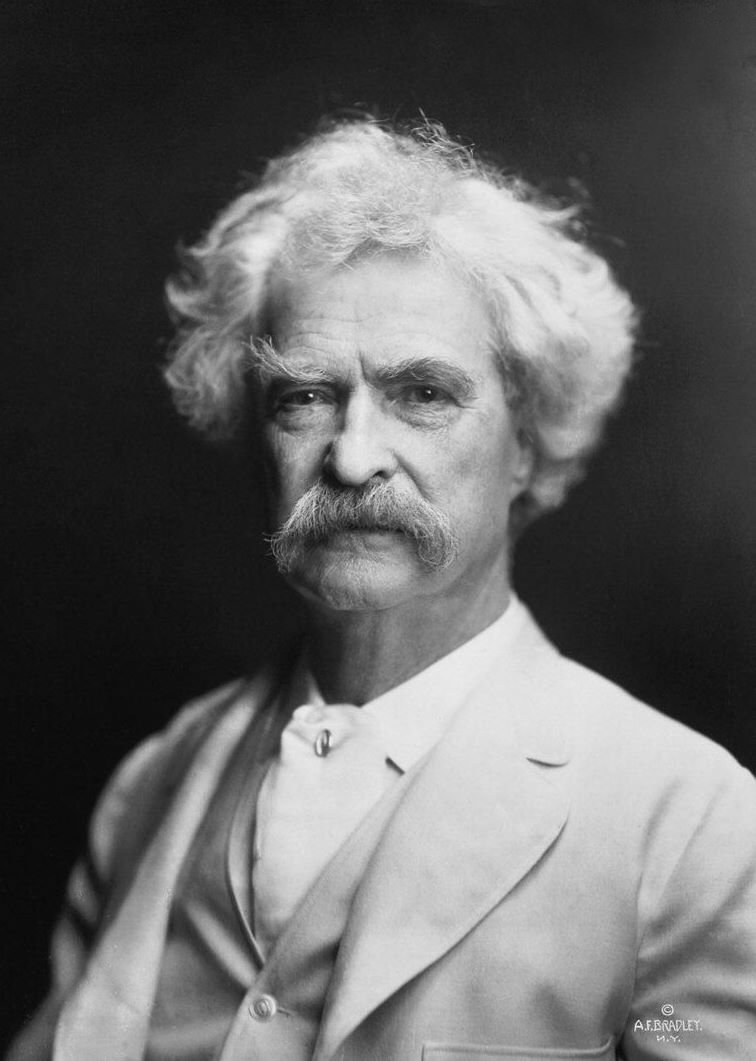
Huebsch adapted books to film, including a story by Mark Twain (here, in 1907)

Huebsch became a screenwriter, whose career took off in the late 1940s. He often adapted books to film, as in Best Man Wins, adapted from a story by Mark Twain. Blacklist scholars Ceplair and Englund grouped Huebsch among those screenwriters who considered movies a "high art."

Huebsch joined the League of American Writers, a Popular Front group organized by the Communist Party in 1935 and disbanded in 1943. (His relative B.W. Huebsch of Viking Press was also a member.)

By 1951, Huebsch went onto the Hollywood Blacklist; his name was omitted from writing credits for The Son of Dr. Jekyll.

=== Hollywood Blacklist ===
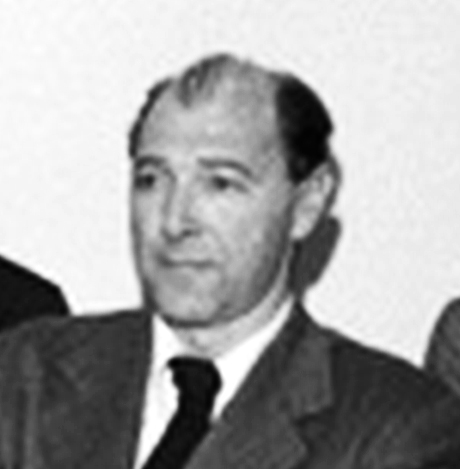
One of Huebsch's screenwriter friends was Lester Cole (here in 1947, around the time he became one of the Hollywood Ten)

Investigation into Communist infiltration into Hollywood commenced nationally with hearings by the House Un-American Activities Committee (HUAC) in October 1947 that led to indictment of the Hollywood Ten for contempt of Congress.

On April 17, 1951, Huebsch's name came up during hearings. HUAC investigator William A. Wheeler testified:

The last individual which I wish to bring to the committee's attention is Edward Huebsch. He resides at 11200 La Maida, Los Angeles, Calif. We received this subpena rather late on our first trip to California, and when we received it we accompanied the United States marshal or deputy United States marshal to the home of Mr. Huebsch. The marshal talked to Mrs. Huebsch and was informed that her husband would be home later that same date. We stayed around the place until fairly late at night, and Mr. Huebsch did not return. Inquiries around the neighborhood disclosed that the next day Mrs. Huebsch loaded the station wagon up and left. No one has been there for the last 5 weeks. We contacted the residence again on April 6, and no one was at home.

(The HUAC hearing transcript includes a footnote with corrected address: "Edward Huebsch, 10200 La Nida, North Hollywood.") Wheeler then read aloud for the public a letter from Jakes J. Boyiz, US Marshal for the Southern District of California, that shared "the following named persons be served subpenas commanding their appearance In the District of Columbia: Georgia Backus Alexander, Jack Berry, Hugo Butler, Leonardo Bercovici, Edward Huebsch, Karen Morley, Fred Rinaldo, Lew Solomon, Michael Uris." Finally, writer-director Frank Wright Tuttle worked through a list of subversive Hollywood people, which included Huebsch:

MR. TUTTLE: ...Mr. Huebsch, H-u-e-b-s-c-h, a writer.
MR. TAVENNER: Do you reca11 his first name?
MR. TUTTLE: I think it was Eddie. I am not sure.
MR. TAVENNER: You say he was a writer?
MR. TUTTLE: Yes.
MR. TAVENNER: You are not certain of his first name, can you identify the person to whom you are referring l\Y any other information so that there will be no question about a confusion of names?
MR. TUTTLE: I can't identify him other than the fact his name was Huebsch. He was in one of the groups I was in and he was a writer.

In May 1952, Huebsch joined 14 others (including members of the Hollywood Ten) in writing a letter to the Screen Writers Guild that urged the guild to stand up for credits to Paul Jarrico as screenwriter for the movie The Las Vegas Story.

During testimony by fellow screenwriter Stanley Roberts, Huebsch's name came up again on May 20, 1952. Roberts described himself as a "motion-picture writer" who had worked in that business since 1936 for studios major (Metro-Goldwyn-Mayer, Columbia, Universal) and minor (Monogram). Roberts tried to explain to the committee that, "It is very difficult for us to understand, but communism in Hollywood, as I have seen it, is on a purely local level. It doesn't seem to go anywhere." In 1938, Roberts first met Ben Barzman's home, where members like John Howard Lawson asked him to join. In late April or early May 1945, right after the death of Franklin Delano Roosevelt ("the death of liberalism in America"), Bernard C. Schoenfeld got him to join. Two or three other "delegates" came to visit Roberts after that, one of whom was Edward Huebsch. These delegates, including Huebsch, persuaded him that "The party was merely interested in the things that I was interested in, better conditions in the Screen Writers' Guild, better labor conditions in Hollywood, higher wages, and so forth, and in furthering Roosevelt's policies." Roberts left the Party in 1946, but Huebsch came back to ask him to rejoin and support the Conference of Studio Unions (CSU) strike (see "Hollywood Black Friday").

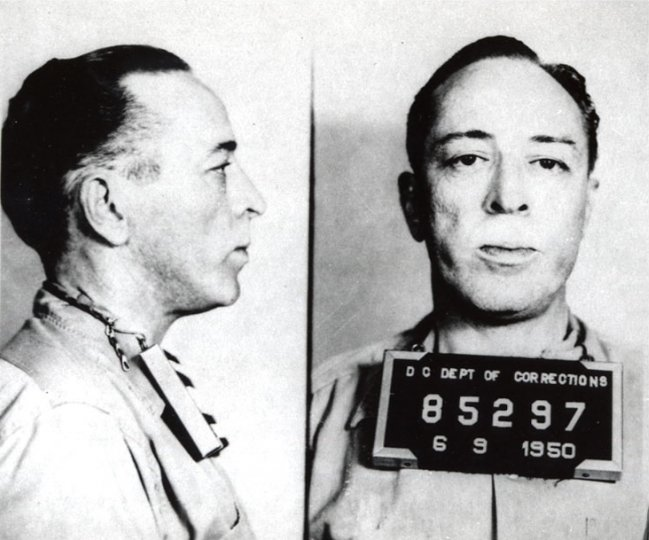
Huebsch's colleagues included Dalton Trumbo (from mugshot dated 1950-06-09 at the Federal Correctional Institution, Ashland)

Roberts then went on the name Huebsch as a member of Communist-dominated groups in Hollywood:

- Screen Writers Guild: Ben Barzman, John Howard Lawson, Bernard C. Schoenfeld, Paul Trivers
- Conference of Studio Unions: Herbert Biberman, Edward Biberman and wife Sonja Dahl, Michael Uris and wife Dorothy Tree, Hugo Butler and wife Jean Rouverol, John Berry (director), Bernard C. Schoenfeld, Irwin Lieberman, Carl Foreman, Alex Greenberg
- Screen Writers Magazine: Lester Cole, Dalton Trumbo, John Howard Lawson, Gordon Kahn, Hugo Butler, Richard Collins

On March 23, 1953, Huebsch himself appeared before HUAC, counseled by William B. Esterman. Initially, Huebsch objected to the televising of hearings by Congress, a point to which the committee acceded and rescheduled his hearing. On March 24, 1953, David A. Lang, a fellow screenwriter, named Huebsch as part of a Communist cell whose members also included: George Bassman, Nick Bela, Edward Biberman, Henry Blankfort, Laurie Blankfort, William Blowitz, Hugo Butler, Howard Dimsdale, Morton Grant, Lester Koenig, Millard Lampell, Pauline Lagerfin, Isobel Lennart, Al Levitt, Arnold Manoff, Mortimer Offner, W.L. River, Bob Robert, Marguerite Roberts, John Stanford, Wilma Shore, George Sklar, Bess Taffel, Seymour Bennett, Eunice Mindlin, and Val Burton. Lang also described a "Writers' Clinic" to which many Hollywood Ten writers belonged. On March 25, 1953, Huebsch returned for testimony, this time counseled not only by Esterman but also Daniel G. Marshall. Huebsch began by correcting the committee, saying he had not asked for no televisions but for a quashing of his subpoena. The committee disregarded his request but assured him he was not being recorded. After a short biography, the committee pressed him to state whether he had ever been a member of the Communist Party USA. Huebsch declined to answer, citing the Fifth Amendment. The committee pressed him by demanding he cite which provision of the Fifth Amendment, etc. Huebsch was equally aggressive, calling committee chairman Harold Velde "King Harold Velde" (in reference to King George III). When the committee tried to press Huebsch into strictly "yes" or "no" answers, Huebsch cited a passage in the Fifth Amendment that prohibited the committee from such. Eventually, Huebsch refused to answer by citing the First, Fifth, Ninth, and Tenth Amendments of the United States Constitution, at which point the committee dismissed him.

The New York Times noted Huebsch's "verbal jousting" with HUAC and that committee members called him "contemptuous."

=== Comeback ===
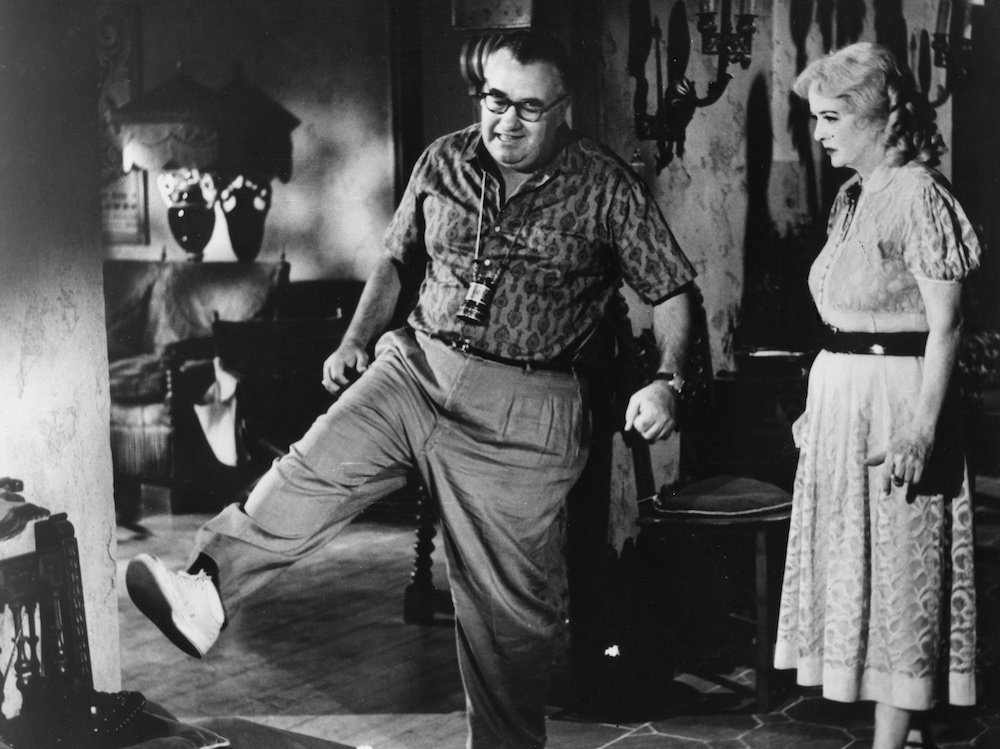
Huebsch's last script was directed by Robert Aldrich (here in 1962 with Bette Davis during production of the movie What Ever Happened to Baby Jane?)

In 1977, Huebsch tried to make a comeback with Twighlight's Last Gleaming, directed by Robert Aldrich. Variety called it "intricate, intriguing and intelligent drama." The New York Times called the movie a "deadly solemn, gadgety suspense-melodrama about a disgruntled, liberal-thinking United States general, a Vietnam veteran whose out-spoken antiwar views got him railroaded to prison on a trumped-up murder charge." While the newspaper summed it up in 1977 as having "no star," in 2012 a new review said it "epitomized a paranoid, quintessentially ’70s moment in American history and imagination... a nerve-racking procedural."

In 1979, Huebsch published the historical fiction novel The Last Summer of Mata Hari, whose review by Kirkus Reviews summarized it as "Noble banalities pulse endlessly from Mata's tear-drenched heartstrings and drown whatever sense of realism this yucky pseudo-historical novel might have had. Bathos supreme."

== Death ==
Huebsch died age 68 on July 7, 1982, in Los Angeles, California.

== Legacy ==
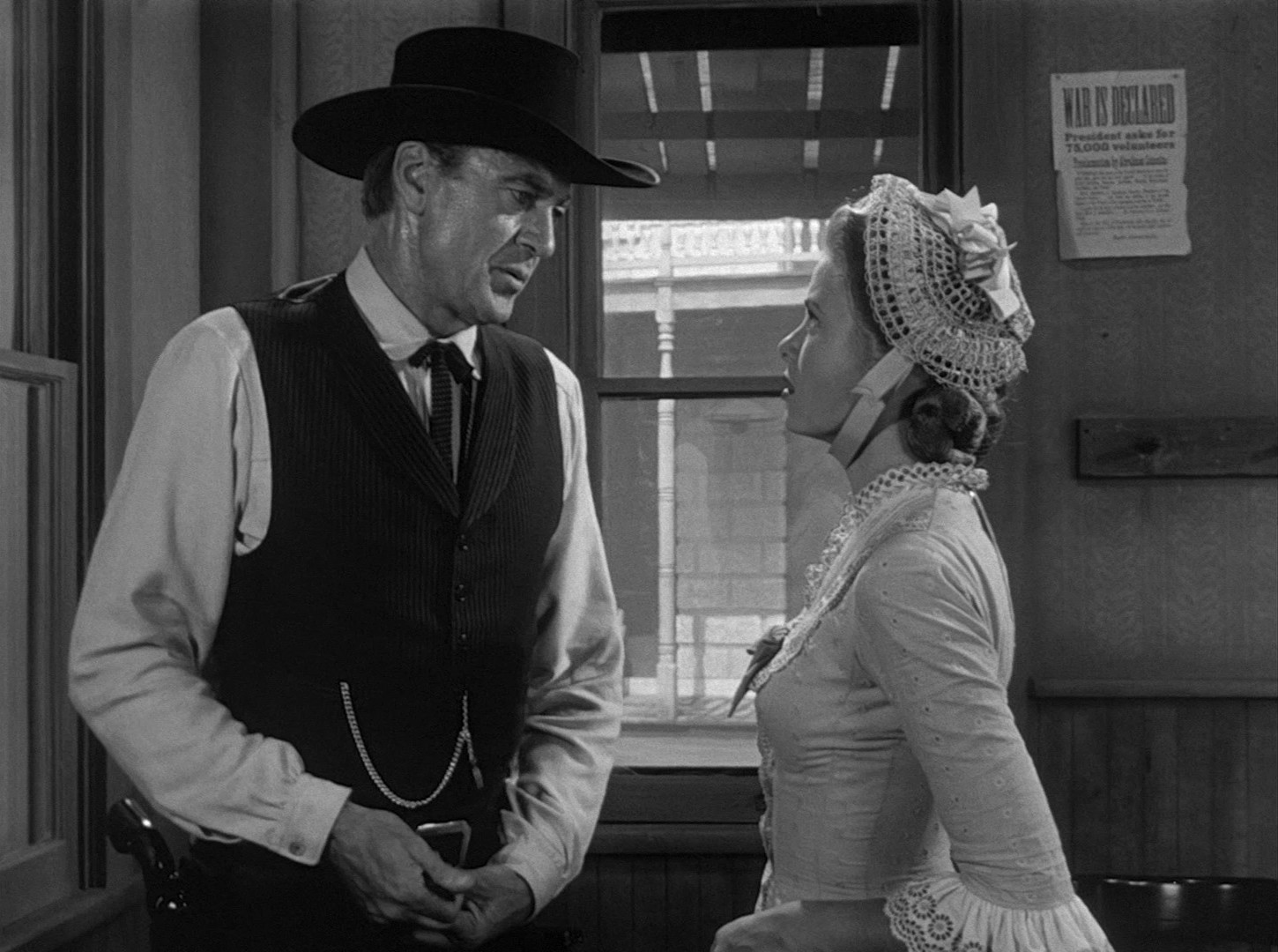
On behalf of the Party, Huebsch interviewed at length fellow screenwriter Carl Foreman, who penned the script for High Noon (here, Gary Cooper and Grace Kelly appear in a scene together)

In 1980, Victor Navasky named Huebsch as a communist with the following passage in his book Naming Names with regard to Carl Foreman, a fellow American screenwriter:

Another party interested in Foreman's testimony was the CP itself. They sent the screenwriter Eddie Huebsch to interview Foreman:

I was assigned by the Party to find out what Foreman's testimony was going to be. I had lunch with him--he was doing High Noon at the time. I sat for eleven hours with him. We went to Lucy's, the fanciest restaurant in Hollywood--across from Paramount. I could not get him to assert that he would take an anti-Communist position. So I reported that he was an informer. Nothing he has said then or since has convinced me I was wrong... The main point is, Carl wouldn't tell the Commies to go fuck themselves... I would have recommended expulsion.

Also in 1980, Ceplair and Englund mentioned Huebsch as one of those dodged subpoenas, recalled in 1999 by fellow screenwriter Bernard Gordon in a specific incident:

An especially odious instance of this kind of hysteria occurred close to home at a meeting of the Screen Writers Guild in Hollywood. A good friend of mine, Edward Huebsch, was ducking a subpoena from HUAC but decided to attend a guild meeting because a discussion of the guild and the blacklist was scheduled. Outside the meeting hall, Eddie spotted the federal marshal who had been trying to serve him. Eddie ducked into the hall and saw the marshal was trying to follow him into the closed meeting. Eddie immediately asked the chair to have the marshal barred, because only member of the guild were permitted. One of the right-wing members raised a point of order and moved the marshal be given temporary membership in the guild and be permitted to enter the hall. This was promptly scheduled; the chair called for a vote... The members voted in favor of the motion. The marshal walked over and served Eddie the subpoena.

Interpreting the meaning of this event, Gordon concluded: "It means that the fear of the consequences were so pervasive for anyone who was seen to opposed the extreme right wing that no one dared to take such a stand openly" and opposed the blacklisting. In 1997, the Writers Guild of America included Huebsch among 24 films that used pseudonyms (or "fronts") for true writers. In 2000, the Writers Guild of America West issued further corrected blacklist credits that included Huebsch:

LITTLE GIANTS (Producciones Olmeca)
Original Credit: Written for the Screen by Hugo Mozo and Eduardo Bueno. (1958)
Corrected Credit: Written for the Screen by Hugo Butler and Edward Huebsch. (04/01/97)

== Works ==
Screenplays:

- Millie's Daughter (1947)
- Sport of Kings (1947)
- Black Eagle (1948)
- Best Man Wins (1948)
- The Wreck of the Hesperus (1948)
- Your Show Time ("A Lodging for the Night") (1949)
- The Son of Dr. Jekyll (1951)
- Lux Video Theatre ("Millie's Daughter") (1956)
- Little Giants (as "Eduardo Bueno") with Hugo Butler (as "Hugo Mozo") (1958)
  - Los pequeños gigantes (as "Eduardo Bueno") with Hugo Butler (as "Hugo Mozo") (1960)
- Twilight's Last Gleaming (1977)

Stories for Scripts:

- Cigarette Girl (1947)

Books:

- The Last Summer of Mata Hari (1979)

== See also ==
- List of members of the League of American Writers
- Hollywood Ten
- Hollywood Blacklist
