= Maxine Finsterwald =

American dramatist (1906–1993)

Maxine Finsterwald (1906 – April 7, 1993) wrote radio scripts, plays, short stories, and newspaper features in the United States. She sometimes used the pen name Maxine Wood.

== Early life and career ==
She was born Maxine Flora Finsterwald in Marion, Wisconsin, Mr. and Mrs. Charles Finsterwald were her parents. She grew up in Detroit, Michigan. She studied at Wellesley, Cornell, and Carnegie Institute.

She wrote radio scripts for Kaffee Klatch and Playhouse of the Air before moving to New York City.

Her play Giants in Chains won the Otto H. Kahn prize in 1928. Her play On Whitman Avenue was staged in Buffalo and then on Broadway in 1946. It addressed relations between African Americans and whites. Canada Lee was an actor and a producer for the show and Margo Jones directed.

She was a supporter of a proposed Conference on Civil and Human Rights organized in the wake of jailings of Communist Party organizers in the United States.

Carnegie Mellon University has a collection of papers related to her early career and plays up through 1946. The University of Iowa has a collection of her papers.

She was interviewed December 10, 1974.

== Death ==
She died of congestive heart failure.

== Plays ==
- Giants in Chains (1928)
- The Severed Cord (1929)
- Seven Against One (1930)
- On Whitman Avenue, staged on Broadway in 1946
- Sandals and Golden Heels (1948)

== See also ==
- Civil rights dramas
- List of members of the League of American Writers
