= Best Man Wins =

1948 film by John Sturges

- Directed by: John Sturges
- Written by: Edward Huebsch
- Based on: The Celebrated Jumping Frog of Calaveras County by Mark Twain
- Produced by: Ted Richmond
- Starring: Edgar Buchanan; Anna Lee; Robert Shayne
- Cinematography: Vincent J. Farrar
- Edited by: James Sweeney
- Music by: Mischa Bakaleinikoff
- Production company: Columbia Pictures
- Distributed by: Columbia Pictures
- Release date: May 6, 1948
- Running time: 78 minutes
- Country: United States
- Language: English
- Budget: $400,000

Best Man Wins is a 1948 American historical drama film directed by John Sturges and starring Edgar Buchanan, Anna Lee and Robert Shayne. It was produced and distributed by Columbia Pictures. It is based on the story The Celebrated Jumping Frog of Calaveras County by Mark Twain.

== Plot ==
In 1853, gambling addict Jim Smiley returns to Dawson's Landing, Missouri, after being away ten years from his wife and son. He brings along a frog named Daniel Webster. While registering at the local hotel, Smiley bets Sheriff Dingle and others that he can make Daniel jump simply by ordering it to do so. He wins the bet and uses his prize money to finance his hotel room. While visiting his ex-wife Nancy, Smiley learns she is about to marry a local judge, Leonidas Carter. Smiley also meets his son, Bob, for the first time. To make amends and win the boy's heart, he endeavors to buy him a racing greyhound, later to be dubbed Andrew Jackson. In time, Smiley makes it his goal to win back both his son and his wife from the snobby judge.

Smiley begins by renouncing gambling altogether. He gets a job at the local hotel, but he relapses when secretly placing a huge bet on the judge's new greyhound, Rajah, to win a big race against Bob's dog, Andrew Jackson. Instead, Andrew wins, and Smiley is suddenly broke. He also experiences guilt over having lied to Nancy and letting his son down by attempting to hedge the losing bet. Nancy had believed he was a reformed man. That's the reason she agreed to marry him again. But when the big day arrives, Judge Carter tries to stop the wedding by challenging Smiley's ability to pay for the $1,000 ceremony.

The challenge turns into a bet, involving two jumping frogs. Smiley wins but refuses to accept any reward. In doing so, he restores his dignity in front of Nancy when he confesses about the bet on the previous dog race. But she is still happy about his new honesty and agrees to remarry him anyway.

== Cast ==
- Edgar Buchanan as Jim Smiley
- Anna Lee as Nancy Smiley
- Robert Shayne as Judge Leonidas K. Carter
- Gary Gray as Bob Smiley
- Hobart Cavanaugh as Amos
- Stanley Andrews ad Sheriff Dingle
- George Lynn as Mr. Crow
- Bill Sheffield as Monty Carter
- Marietta Canty as Hester
