= Maud Leonard McCreery =

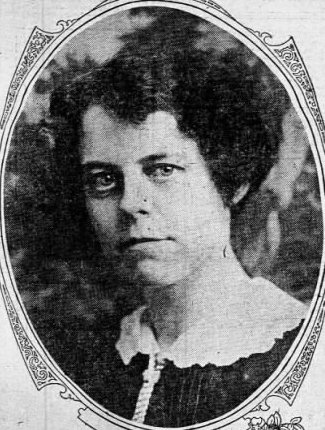
- Maud Leonard McCreery, from a 1916 publication.
- Born: February 24, 1883; Wauwatosa, Wisconsin
- Died: April 10, 1938 (aged 55); Milwaukee, Wisconsin
- Occupations: suffragist, labor organizer, newspaper editor

Maria Maud Leonard McCreery (February 24, 1883 – April 10, 1938) was an American suffragist, pacifist, labor activist, educator, and newspaper editor from Wisconsin.

== Early life ==
Maria Maud Leonard was born in Wauwatosa, Wisconsin, the daughter of Dr. Sylvester S. Leonard and Annie Riley Leonard. Her father was a veterinarian.

== Career ==
Maud McCreery was an active suffragist, touring the United States speaking on the topic from 1912 to 1918. She did suffrage organizing and lecturing in Iowa, Pennsylvania, South Dakota, and Nebraska, and was press chair of the Nevada Equal Suffrage Association in 1914. "Women who are now protesting against the ballot are of the same type who years ago fought against the education of their sex," she told an audience in Olyphant, Pennsylvania, in 1913, adding that "The only real way to find out whether women want the ballot is to give it to them." In 1918, she was legislative chair of the Woman's Party in Milwaukee. "Many people believe that we are bold and unscrupulous," she said of suffragists, countering that "we are just common everyday people working for what we believe is a righteous cause, and we are trying to do it honestly."

McCreery also toured nationally as a speaker for the League to Enforce Peace. In the 1920s she lived in Chicago and worked for the Federated Press News Service; she also worked for the Wisconsin Anti-Tuberculosis Association and Amalgamated Clothing Workers of America in Wisconsin. In 1930, she began editing the women's page at the Milwaukee Leader newspaper. She was editor of the Sheboygan New Deal in 1936. She organized women's auxiliaries for the American Federation of Labor in 1937, and taught at the School for Workers at the University of Wisconsin.

== Personal life ==
Maud Leonard married lawyer Rex Irving McCreery in 1902; the marriage ended in divorce in 1918. She married carpenter James Walter Walker as her second husband in 1923; they divorced in 1931. She died in a Milwaukee hotel in 1938, aged 55 years. In 1945, the Maud McCreery Lodge was founded in Milwaukee, named in memory of McCreery by the Ladies' Auxiliary of the machinists' union local.
