= Donald E. Montgomery =

American economist

Donald Ewan Montgomery (1896–1957) was an American economist who served in the United States Department of Agriculture (USDA) during the New Deal, and later was a labor activist for the United Automobile Workers (UAW).

== Early life and education ==
Montgomery was born on October 16, 1896. In 1918, he earned a BA from the University of Pennsylvania. He pursued graduate study at the University of Wisconsin.

== Career ==
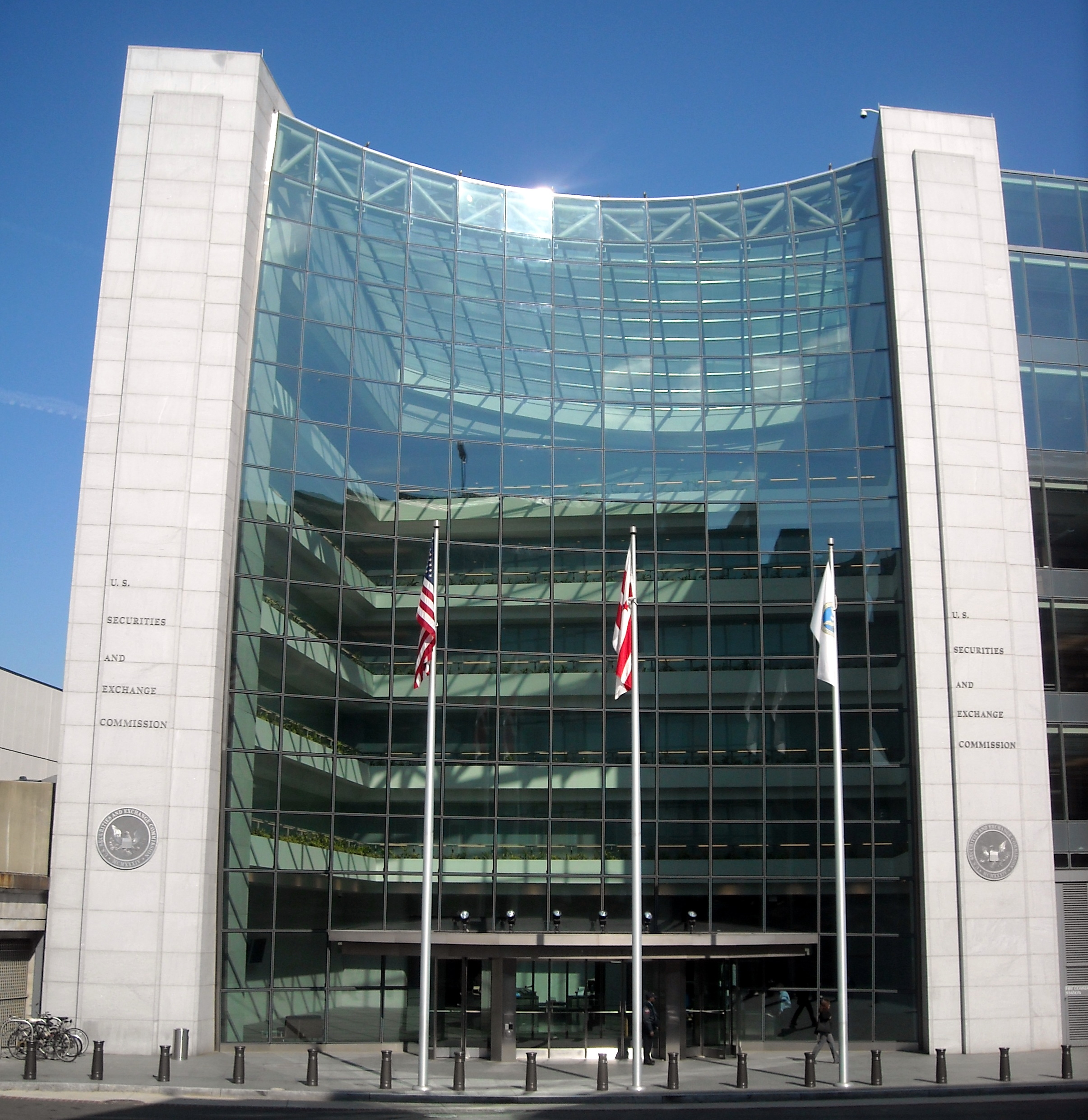
The SEC in Washington, D.C., near Washington Union Station

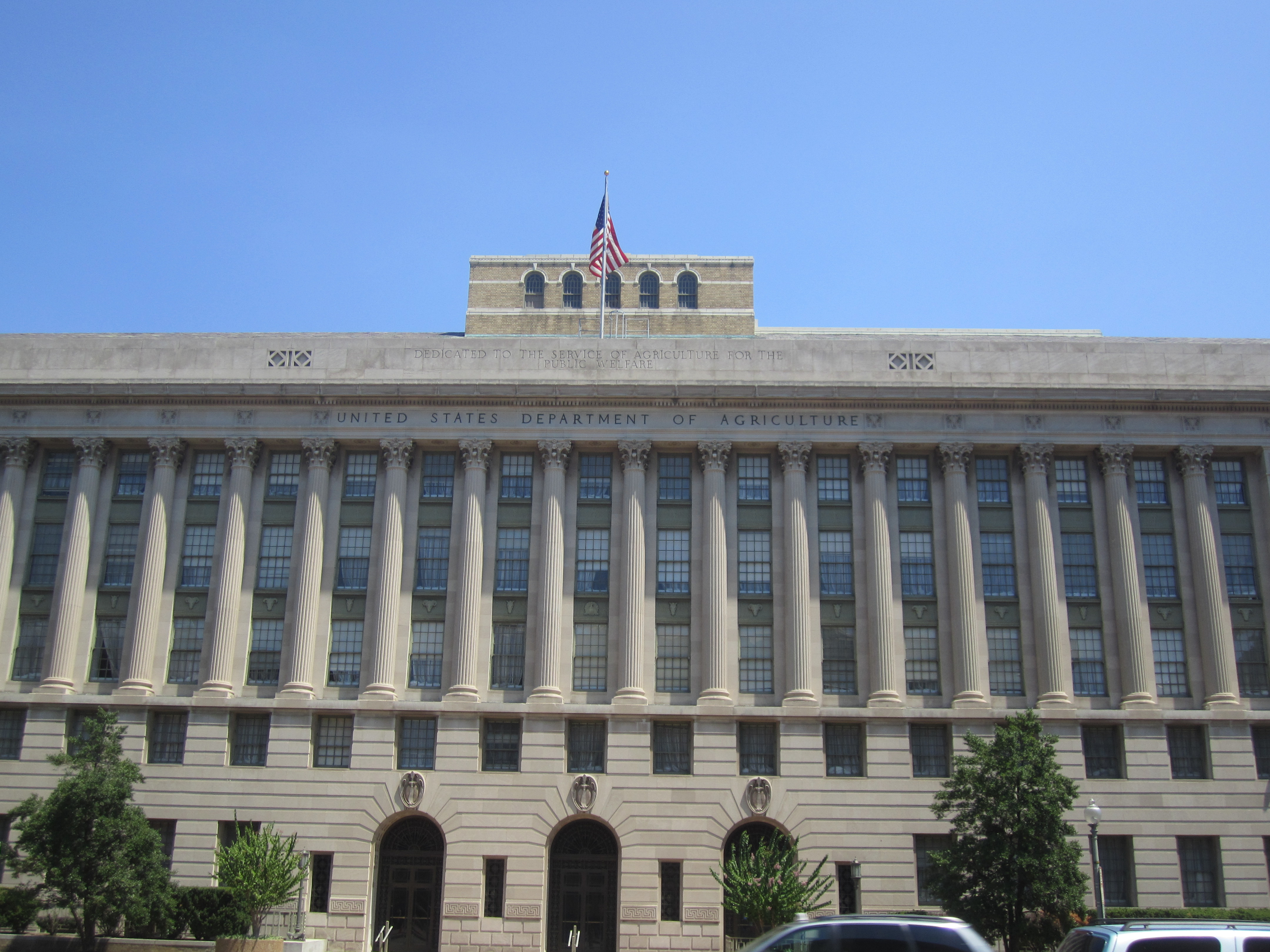
The Jamie L. Whitten Building in Washington D.C., headquarters of the Department of Agriculture

Montgomery served as Director of the Registration Division of the United States Securities and Exchange Commission (SEC).

In September 1935, he resigned from the SEC to become "Consumer Counsel" at USDA. During 1942, Montgomery appeared on Labor for Victory, a 15-minute weekly radio show on NBC, created by the AFL and CIO. The episode also included the CIO's director of publicity, Len De Caux. In December 1942, he left USDA.

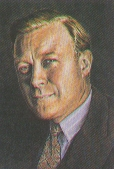
Walter Reuther

In February 1943, he again became "Consumer Counsel," this time for the UAW. Walter Reuther was recruiting professionals for various UAW branch offices and included Montgomery, a liberal economist and professional in New Deal laws and regulations. He served as UAW representative on the Policy Committee of Price Administration. In 1947, when the UAW's Washington Office Policy Committee reorganized, Reuther appointed Montgomery as director. He served in that capacity until his death.

Historian Irving Richter calls Montgomery a "close advisor" of Reuther's, who even ghost-wrote matters for the UAW president.

== Personal life ==
Montgomery served as an ensign in the U.S. Navy during World War I. In 1920, he married Sarah Victorine Adamson (1898–1987) of Cedartown, Georgia. They had three children, Donald Jr., Charles and Margaret, and were living in Washington, D.C., in 1940. The couple divorced in 1951.

== Death ==
On October 11, 1957, Montgomery died from suicide. Newspapers reported the cause of death as suicide: "He killed himself at home yesterday after telephoning police."

== External sources ==
- "UAW Washington Office Legislative Department: Donald Montgomery Records". Wayne State University. Archived from the original on 16 December 2019.
- Newman, Kathleen M. (17 May 2004). Radio Active: Advertising and Consumer Activism, 1935-1947. University of California Press. pp. 158–159. ISBN 9780520936751.
- ILWU Dispatcher image of Montgomery (1943)
- Donald E. Montgomery at Find a Grave
