= Civil rights dramas =

Television shows about the U.S. Civil War

From the end of the Second World War to the beginning of the McCarthy era (1945–1950), the American professional theatre produced twenty shows on civil rights, nine of them on Broadway.

Off-Broadway and out of town shows displayed a wider array of moral stances, ranging from gentle persuasion of Florence (1949) by Alice Childress and the religious fervor of Trial by Fire (1947) by George Dunne to the activism of Earth and Stars (1946) by Randolph Edmonds.

While musicals dominated commercial theatre in the 1940s, four dramas about African Americans addressed the nation's racial dilemma. The first, Richard Wright's, Native Son (1941), opened at the St. James Theatre on Broadway on 24 March 1941. Wright's novel had firmly laid the responsibility for Bigger's brutality on the doorstep of white America, but in adapting the novel to the stage, Paul Green, a southern folk dramatist, had insisted that Bigger take some responsibility for the murders he had committed. John Houseman and Orson Welles preferred Wright's original concepts and discarded the modifications made by Green, which had softened Bigger's character. When Green saw the play he was angered and later published his own version. Canada Lee created the role of Bigger Thomas, receiving near unanimous praise from the critics. The production ran for 114 straight performances before touring major US cities and returning to New York to run for an additional eighty-four performances before closing, in part because of America's declared war on 7 December 1941, which had refocused the nation's attention.

The second civil rights drama, Strange Fruit (1945), set in a small Georgia town, had been adapted from Lilian Smith's controversial novel. Staged by José Ferrer, the play featured 23-year-old Jane White as Nonnie, a black girl made pregnant by a white boy played by Mel Ferrer. Other Blacks in the cast were Juano Hernandez, Edna Thomas, Alonzo Bosan, Ken Renard, and Dorothy Carter. Robert Earl Jones played the lynch victim. The play lasted for sixty performances, in part because Eleanor Roosevelt wrote enthusiastically about it in her syndicated column, "My Day."

After the Allies defeated Germany and Japan in 1945, black soldiers returned home to segregated housing. On Whitman Avenue (1946), a civil rights drama on discrimination in the renting and sale of housing, starred Canada Lee, this time playing a decorated war hero trying to move his family into a white neighborhood. Abbie Mitchell, Augustus Smith, and Peter Morell played the members of Lee's family. Margo Jones, from Dallas, Texas, directed the drama, which was written by Maxine Wood. In response to unenthusiastic reviews, Eleanor Roosevelt observed in her weekly column that the American people were in a period of retrogression and did not want to be reminded of their shortcomings. With Roosevelt's help and that of Langston Hughes, the play remained alive for 148 performances.
