= Jesse Graves =

American actor (1879–1949)

- Born: March 11, 1879; Moulton, Iowa, United States
- Died: March 4, 1949 (aged 69); Los Angeles, California, United States
- Occupation: Actor
- Years active: 1934–1949

Jesse Graves (1879–1949), also known as Jessie Graves or Jesse A. Graves, was an American character actor of the 1930s and 1940s. During his career he appeared in over 100 films. Some of the more notable include: After the Thin Man in 1936, which stars William Powell, Myrna Loy, and James Stewart; 1938's Jezebel with Bette Davis, Henry Fonda, and George Brent; the Mickey Rooney version of The Adventures of Huckleberry Finn (1939); Frank Capra's 1939 political comedy-drama, Mr. Smith Goes to Washington, starring James Stewart and Jean Arthur; the Orson Welles classic, Citizen Kane (1941); the George Gershwin biopic, Rhapsody in Blue (1945); and the 1948 Spencer Tracy and Katharine Hepburn romantic comedy, State of the Union. His final film was the 1949 western, El Paso, starring John Payne and Gail Russell. As a Black American during this era, most of his roles were as butlers, redcaps, porters, waiters and other servant positions.

== Partial filmography ==
(Per AFI database)

- General Spanky (1936)
- After the Thin Man (1936)
- Make Way for Tomorrow (1937) (credited as Jesse A. Graves )
- Easy Living (1937)
- Mannequin (1937) (credited as Jessie Graves )
- Jezebel (1938) (credited as Jesse A. Graves )
- Going Places (1938)
- The Lady Objects (1938) (credited as Jessie Graves )
- The Adventures of Huckleberry Finn (1939) (credited as Jessie Graves )
- Swanee River (1939)
- Mr. Smith Goes to Washington (1939) - Black Committeeman
- Stronger Than Desire (1939)
- Grand Jury Secrets (1939) (credited as Jesse A. Graves )
- Son of Ingagi (1940)
- Safari (1940)
- The Lone Wolf Takes a Chance (1941)
- Sleepers West (1941)
- Love Crazy (1941)
- Citizen Kane (1941) - Joseph
- Junior Army (1942)
- Ten Gentlemen from West Point (1942)
- Death Valley Manhunt (1943)
- Is Everybody Happy? (1943)
- Someone to Remember (1943)
- After Midnight with Boston Blackie (1943)
- Wilson (1945)
- Bells of Rosarita (1945)
- Rhapsody in Blue (1945)
- She Wouldn't Say Yes (1945)
- The Valley of Decision (1945)
- One Way to Love (1945)
- Do You Love Me (1946)
- G. I. War Brides (1946)
- Magnificent Doll (1946)
- Three Little Girls in Blue (1946)
- Tomorrow Is Forever (1946)
- Two Smart People (1946)
- Without Reservations (1946)
- California (1947)
- The Crimson Key (1947)
- Dead Reckoning (1947)
- The Egg and I (1947)
- Johnny O'Clock (1947)
- Louisiana (1947)
- Millie's Daughter (1947)
- The Sea of Grass (1947)
- This Time for Keeps (1947)
- Variety Girl (1947)
- For the Love of Mary (1948)
- Secret Beyond the Door (1948)
- State of the Union (1948)
