= Julia Ruuttila =

American journalist

Julia Ruuttila (1907–1991) was a journalist, writer, and union and political activist, who wrote stories, articles, and poems under several pen names.

== Early life ==
Julia Godman was born on April 26, 1907, to Ella Blossom Pardan and John Burwell Godman in Eugene, Oregon. Both of her parents were political activists: her mother a socialist, her father an anarchist. Members of the International Workers of the World, known as Wobblies, also visited their home frequently. Her mother was a feminist and suffragette who brought her daughter to demonstrations and sold birth control, which was then illegal, out of their home.

Godman developed a love of writing from an early age. She was mostly homeschooled, and began a love for imagination and writing. She would become a published author in high school. Her story “The Agate Hunter” and her poem “Brotherhood” were published in the 1924 edition of the Eugenean- her high school's yearbook. Her activism was present in these early works, with “Brotherhood” containing anti-racist metaphors, and “The Agate Hunter” expressing concerns over becoming a wage slave.

== Adult life ==
Julia Godman was briefly married to a man named William Clayton Bowen between 1924 and 1925. That marriage was annulled. She then attended the University of Oregon during the 1925–1926 school year. It was in Eugene that she met Maurice "Butch" Bertram. They married in 1926, and in 1927, moved to Chicago, where they had their son, Michael Jack (Mike). They returned to Oregon in 1929, and Butch began working at a sawmill in Linnton, just outside of Portland.

In 1943, she divorced Butch Bertam, and married Ben Eaton, a seaman. She divorced him in 1946. In 1951, she married for the final time to Oscar Ruuttila, who was American-born but raised in Finland. He worked for the Pillsbury mill in Astoria, Oregon and was active in his union, the International Longshore and Warehouse Union. Shortly after, Julia moved to Astoria. Two years later, Julia and Oscar took in her grandson, Shane, after Mike's marriage fell apart, he took off and his wife didn't want him. Eventually Julia and Oscar were able to adopt him. Julia's mother Ella also moved in with them. After Oscar Ruuttila died of a heart attack in 1962, Julia moved back to Portland with Shane and her mother in tow.

Julia would stay in Portland and continue her activist work for several decades following. At eighty years old, she moved to Anchorage, Alaska to live with her grandson, Shane. She retired from her job at The Dispatcher, the publication of the ILWU. She would also receive honorary lifelong membership in the International Woodworkers of America, who she had also worked for in its early days. She died in 1991.

== Activism ==
Julia Ruuttila spent much of her adult life working for various labor unions and their publications. In 1936, while married to Butch Bertam, she and her husband encouraged the workers of the sawmill at which he worked to unionize. The union left the American Federation of Labor, and became the International Woodworkers of America, joining the CIO. The union was locked out, and Ruuttila, with the help of the women's auxiliary that she founded, ensured that the workers could support themselves and their families during the lockout.

Also in 1936, she helped form the Free Ray Becker Committee. Ray Becker was one of the members of the Industrial Workers of the World (IWW), also known a Wobblies, who were imprisoned following a travesty of a trial that grew out of the November 11, 1919 event known as the Centralia Massacre, also known as the Centralia Tragedy. During the first Armistice Day, the first anniversary of the end of World War I, the Wobblies of Centralia defended their hall from an attack by the American Legion and in the process killed four legionnaires. The trial was blatantly unfair and even jurors later joined in petitioning for their pardons. One man died in prison, 5 others accepted parole but one IWW man wanted a pardon. With the work of the committee and the ACLU, in 1939 Ray Becker was released

In 1948, under the pen name Kathleen Cronin, she wrote an article for People's World, a Communist Party USA publication that called out the Portland Housing Authority and the State Public Welfare Commission for its failures to adequately aid the victims of the Vanport Flood. She was at the time working for the welfare commission and, despite the pen name, she lost her job.

While living in Astoria, Ruuttila worked for the Columbia River Fishermen's Protective Union, created an ILWU Women's Auxiliary, and a Committee for Protection of Foreign Born. This committee led to her being subpoenaed by the House Committee on Un-American Activities, in an investigation on Communist Political Subversion, despite the fact that she was not a member of the Communist Party.

Following her 1962 return to Portland, Ruuttila served on the Legislative Committee of the Portland Longshore Auxiliary. She also joined a campaign by the Women's International League for Peace and Freedom to stop nerve gas from being moved to a chemical depot in Umatilla. She also opposed the Vietnam War, and encouraged laborers to join the anti-war movement.

Julia Ruuttila was arrested several times. The first time, was during the IWA lockout, and the last time would be in 1975 during a sit-in at a Portland office of Pacific Power and Light, protesting their rising prices.

== Writing career ==
=== Fiction, poetry and personal writing ===
Julia Ruuttila wrote profusely throughout her long life. She wrote poetry since she was a girl and published poems in her high school annual and in later years in the Oregonian newspaper. She self published a book of poetry near the end of her life. She also wrote romance stories for True Story Magazine when she badly needed money. Her work contains themes of anti-racism, leftism, and class politics. For example, “The Wolf at the Door” is a love story ruined by class differences set in a fictionalized version of the sawmill company town she lived in in the 1920s and 30s. She began writing “The Bridges of Ce,” her memoir, when she was fifty but it remains a fragment. Another memoir is the essay “Eggs in Baskets” telling of her mother's distribution of illegal birth control door-to-door in Eugene, Oregon when Julia was a girl. Like many writers, she often used pieces of her own life in her fiction, for example “Murder in the High Rise” is about an elderly murder victim who wrote for labor publications.

=== Journalism ===
Ruuttila spent a large portion of her life writing for labor publications. In 1936, she began writing for The Timberworker, the newspaper for the woodworkers union she was involved with. In 1938, she began to write for People’s World, a CP USA publication. She worked as a correspondent for a labor and farm news service Federated Press until its closure in 1956. She also began writing for the International Longshore and Warehouse Union's paper, The Dispatcher in 1946, and retired in 1987.
