= Leon Srabian Herald =

American poet

- Born: Leon Der Srabian; 15 May 1896; Put-Aringe near Erzincan (destroyed)
- Died: 7 September 1976 (aged 80)
- Citizenship: American
- Years active: 1915–1946
- Known for: "Memories of My Village" (1915)
- Notable work: This Waking Hour (1915)
- Movement: Communist
- Spouse: Betty Forster
- Children: John Herald

Leon Srabian Herald (born Leon Der Srabian; 15 May 1896 – 7 September 1976) was an Armenian-American poet who wrote the first English-language book by an Armenian author on the subject of the Armenian genocide.

== Biography ==
=== Background ===
Herald was born in Put-Aringe, near Erzincan in 1896. In 1912, he emigrated with his family to America.

He worked briefly in car factories in Detroit. Then, in the early 1920s, he attended the University of Wisconsin at Madison, where he befriended Zona Gale and Marianne Moore, fellow poet and editor of The Dial literary magazine. He wrote poems and reviews for the Wisconsin State Journal. He became a naturalized U.S. citizen in 1923.

=== Career ===
In 1925, Herald published a first book of poems, This Waking Hour. The Dial serialized his memoirs monthly from December 1926 to June 1927, which describe his home village, education in Cairo, and travel to the States.

Later that year he moved to New York, where he lived almost all his life.

In 1925, he attended the MacDowell Colony in Peterborough, New Hampshire. In 1928, he attended the Yaddo Colony in Saratoga Springs, New York.

In 1927, he worked in the New York Public Library with Whittaker Chambers.

During the 1920s and 1930s, he published in The Nation, The New Republic, Commonweal, Poetry, and Ararat (Armenian quarterly).

His story "Power of Horizon" appeared in Edward J. O'Brien's collections of Best Short Stories of 1929. Work also appeared in Armenian-American Poets: A Bilingual Anthology and in William S. Braithwaite's Anthology of Magazine Verse.

In 1935, he helped form the Federal Writers' Project.

At some time, he served as editor of two Armenian-American publications: Youth (weekly) and Learning (journal).

== Communism ==
Herald was "always an advocate of the working class."

In the late 1920s, he joined the John Reed Club. He was a delegate to Club's 1932 national convention (and claimed to have traveled with Whittaker Chambers, which Allen Weinstein claimed was not possible).

He was a member of the CPUSA-led League of American Writers (1935–1943).

In the 1960s, Herald later provided this information to Meyer Zeligs, a psychoanalyst who wrote a pscyho-biography called Friendship and Fratricide about Whittaker Chambers. Herald told Zeligs that Chambers had tried to sleep with him in 1932, demonstrating homosexuality. Zeligs claimed he had not hidden his identity – but in fact had written his name as "Leon S. Herald" whereas the poet was well known under his full name in America as "Leon Srabian Herald."

== Personal and death ==
In 1915, Herald lost his family in Armenia during the Armenian genocide.

In 1938, he married Betty Forster. In 1939 they had a son, John Whittier Herald, known professionally as folk bard John Herald. In 1942, his wife died of cancer.

In 1946, he had a nervous breakdown. He suffered thereafter for the rest of his life from insomnia.

He died in 1976.

== Works ==
Herald dedicated his only book of poetry "To Those Disinherited of Life in 1915," making him "the very first work in English by an Armenian author, encompassing the subject" of the Armenian genocide.

Books:

- This Waking Hour (1915)

Poems, Stories:

- "The Watermelon and the Saint" in The Dial (August 1928)
- "Power of Horizon," short story in The Dial (April 1929), reprinted in The Best Short Stories of 1929 and the Yearbook of the American Short Story, ed. Edward J. O’Brien (New York: Dodd Mead, 1929)
- "Four Poems" (New York: New American Caravan, 1929), pages 340–342
- "Job" in New Masses (1930)

Correspondence:

- Sherwood Anderson
- Horace Gregory
- Granville Hicks
- Sidney Hook

== See also ==
- Armenian genocide
- The Dial
- John Reed Club
- League of American Writers
- Whittaker Chambers

== External sources ==
- Herald, Leon Srabian - 1929–1931, Letters
