= Millie's Daughter =

1947 film directed by Sidney Salkow

- Directed by: Sidney Salkow
- Written by: Edward Huebsch
- Based on: the novel, Millie's Daughter by Donald Henderson Clarke
- Produced by: William Bloom
- Starring: Gladys George; Gay Nelson; Paul Campbell
- Cinematography: Allen G. Siegler
- Edited by: Aaron Stell
- Music by: Arthur Morton
- Production company: Columbia Pictures
- Distributed by: Columbia Pictures
- Release date: March 20, 1947 (US)
- Running time: 72 minutes
- Country: United States
- Language: English

Millie's Daughter is a 1947 American drama film directed by Sidney Salkow, from a screenplay by Edward Huebsch, based on the novel of the same name by Donald Henderson Clarke. The film stars Gladys George, Gay Nelson, and Paul Campbell, and was released on March 20, 1947.

== Cast ==
- Gladys George as Millie Maitland
- Gay Nelson as Joanna Maitland
- Paul Campbell as Robert Lattimer
- Ruth Donnelly as Helen Reilly
- Norma Varden as Mrs. Sarah Harris
- Arthur Space as Tappie
- Nana Bryant as Mrs. Cooper Austin
- Ethel Griffies as Aunt Katherine
- Harry Hayden as Cummings
- Paul Maxey as Hale
- Robert Emmett Keane as Henry Harris
- Douglas D. Coppin as Escort
- Michael Towne as Escort
- Robert Stevens as Hotel clerk
- Fred Sears as Escort manager
- Nita Bieber as Model
- Dorothy Mathews as Sandra
- Jesse Graves as Black waiter
- Torben Meyer as Mr. Johnson
- Stanley Andrews as Detective
- Leon Lenoir as Alex
