= Edwin Berry Burgum =

American literary scholar and critic (1894–1979)

Edwin Berry Burgum (March 4, 1894 – 1979) was an American literary scholar, critic, and professor of English. He taught at New York University from 1924 until the early 1950s. He is known for his work in literary theory as well as for the circumstances surrounding his dismissal during the early Cold War period.

== Early life and education ==
Burgum was born in Concord, New Hampshire. He received a B.A. from Dartmouth College in 1915, an M.A. from Harvard University in 1917, and a Ph.D. from the University of Illinois Urbana-Champaign in 1924. His dissertation was on the writings of Edward Bulwer-Lytton.

== Academic career ==
Burgum began his academic career at New York University in 1924, where he taught and wrote for nearly three decades. His scholarly work focused on literary criticism and the intersection of literature and social thought.

His publications include:

- The Literary Career of Edward Bulwer Lord Lytton (1926)
- The New Criticism: An Anthology of Modern Aesthetics and Literary Criticism (1930)
- Ulysses and the Impasse of Individualism (1941)
- The Works of James Joyce (1947)
- The Novel and the World's Dilemma (1947)

== Political investigation ==
In the early 1950s, Burgum was investigated during a period of heightened anti-Communist activity in the United States. He was a member of the American Communist Party, and his political affiliations became the subject of federal inquiry. According to later scholarship, officials at New York University cooperated with agencies including the FBI, the House Un-American Activities Committee, and the Senate Internal Security Subcommittee. Soon after the 1953 hearing, Burgum's employment at NYU was terminated, and his case has since been cited in studies of academic freedom and Cold War-era political repression.

== Later life ==
After his dismissal and following his wife's death, he became a practicing psychotherapist.

== See also ==
- New Criticism
- Literary theory
- James Joyce
