= Carl Haessler =

Carl Haessler managed the Federated Press, which provided weekly content to editors of American labor press (including the Daily Worker) and published a 12-page weekly newspaper (pictured)

Carl Haessler (1888–1972) was an American political activist, conscription resister, newspaper editor, and trade union organizer. He is best remembered as an imprisoned conscientious objector during World War I and as the longtime head of the Federated Press, a left wing news service which supplied content to radical and labor newspapers around the country.

== Background ==
Carl Haessler was born August 5, 1888, in Milwaukee, Wisconsin, of ethnic German parents. His father was a building contractor and his mother was a teacher in the Milwaukee public school system. Carl attended public school in Milwaukee and went on to college at the University of Wisconsin in Madison, from which he graduated in 1911 with a bachelor's degree in Latin. The linguist Luise Haessler was his aunt.

During his early years, Haessler raised money for his education by working summers as a farm hand. From 1911 to 1914, Haessler attended Balliol College of Oxford University in England. There he became interested in the socialist movement and joined the Fabian socialists.

== Career ==
Upon his return to the United States in 1914, Haessler took a job teaching in the Philosophy Department of Illinois University at Urbana. He also continued work on his Ph.D., which he received upon completion of his dissertation, entitled "The Failure of Scottish Realism."

=== Politics ===
Haessler joined the Socialist Party of America in 1914.

With American entry into the European conflict early in 1917, the ethnic German pacifist Haessler was dismissed from the university for his political views. He went to work for Victor L. Berger at his socialist daily newspaper, The Milwaukee Leader, remaining their for about a year. During this time he joined the News Writer's Union and the delegate of that organization to the Milwaukee Federated Trades Council.

In the spring of 1918, Haessler was drafted into the U.S. Army. He accepted being drafted but refused to put on the uniform in boot camp and was therefore court martialed under military law. Haessler was found guilty and issued a sentence of 12 years of hard labor. Haessler completed just over two years of his prison sentence, served at the stockades of Fort Leavenworth and Alcatraz military prison from June 1918 until his being released in August 1920 by a presidential pardon. During Haessler's time in prison, his (first) wife, Mildred Haessler (née Barnes), obtained a job as a teacher to support herself. The Haesslers raised their children in the Ravinia neighborhood of Highland Park, Illinois where they were deeply engaged in the arts and the Ravinia Woman's Club, until their divorce in 1940.

During his time in prison, Haessler was removed for a brief period when he was called as a witness for the prosecution in the federal trial of Congressman Victor Berger. The prosecution attempted to demonstrate that Haessler's position as an imprisoned conscientious objector was a product of Berger's direct influence, thereby providing proof of Berger's criminality with respect to the current conscription law. Haessler would have none of it however, replying when asked if he and Berger had had any talks about the war:

Oh yes, I had lots of talks with Berger about the war. You see, I might say that I knew Victor Berger before I was born, since he knew my mother and father. But I don't remember what he said on those talks; I remember distinctly what I said, but his views did not impress me at all. I was far more interested in my views anyhow than I was in his.

Haessler characterized his views as significantly to the left of those of Berger, whom he called an "old fogey" that had told him "not to be a damned fool" and who had considered Haessler too young and rash and impulsive.

=== Federated Press ===
Upon his release, Haessler returned for a time to the employ of Berger's Milwaukee Leader before joining the fledgling Federated Press news service, a press agency which provided news copy to scores of radical and labor newspapers around the country. The Federated Press was initially established by E.J. Costello, former managing editor of The Milwaukee Leader. In 1922, Haessler was named as the managing editor and secretary-treasurer of the Federated Press, positions which he retained until the end of the news service in 1956.

Haessler was also named associate editor of The Federated Press Bulletin, the weekly newspaper of the Federated Press issued for subscribers across America.

In his capacities with the Federated Press, Haessler was a member of the International Typographical Union.

In 1937, Haessler went to work for the Congress of Industrial Organizations (CIO) handling the union's public relations from Flint, Michigan, during its series of sitdown strikes there. He also served as editor of The United Auto Worker until 1941 and was a longtime editor of Tool and Die Maker's News.

=== Later years ===
Beginning in 1963, Haessler became involved in draft counseling of conscientious objectors to the Vietnam War.

== Personal life and death ==
In 1940, Haessler married Lucy Haessler (née Whitaker; first married name Leighton); they lived for many years at 39 Massachusetts Street in Highland Park, Michigan (48203).

His sister, Gertrude Haessler, married William Weinstone, a high ranking-official of the Communist Party.

Carl Haessler died age 84 on December 8, 1972.

== Legacy ==
Haessler's papers are housed at Wayne State University in Detroit, Michigan.
