= Luise Haessler =

- Born: 20 September 1866; Milwaukee, Wisconsin, U.S.
- Died: 8 July 1955 (aged 88); New York, New York, U.S.
- Occupation: Professor of German

Luise Haessler (Milwaukee, Wisconsin, 20 September 1866 – New York City, 8 July 1955) was the first chairman of the German department at Brooklyn College. Upon her retirement, the Luise Haessler Scholarship was founded by her colleagues to recognize, each year, a graduating student who had done outstanding work in German.

== Life and career ==
Luise Haessler received her early schooling in Milwaukee, where she was born. She earned an A.B. degree from the University of Chicago in 1906, and her Ph.D. from the same institution in 1934. Her dissertation on "Old High German Biteilen and Biskerien" was published in 1935 by the Linguistic Society of America, as Language Dissertation no. 19.

She began her academic career as a teacher of German at Hunter College, where she remained from 1907 to 1930. Haessler joined the faculty of Brooklyn College when it was founded in 1930, serving as the first Chairman of the German Department. She remained in that position until her retirement in 1937.

After her retirement, she continued to live in New York City, pursuing her interests in music and in language. She became a member of the American Oriental Society due to her interest in the Chinese language. She died at St. Luke's Hospital in 1955 and was buried in the family plot in Milwaukee.
