= Cyrilly Abels =

Cyrilly Abels (October 12, 1904 – November 8, 1975) was an American editor and literary agent.

== Biography ==
Abels graduated from Radcliffe College in 1926. In the 1930s, she was the executive secretary of the League of American Writers. She served as the managing editor of Mademoiselle magazine between 1945 and 1960. Under her leadership, the magazine's focus shifted from fashion to literature, publishing stories by Truman Capote, Dylan Thomas, and Carson McCullers.

Abels was a close friend of Katherine Anne Porter. In addition to Porter, Abels served as the literary agent for Christina Stead, Francis Steegmuller, Zelda Popkin, and Robert Scheer, among others.

== Legacy ==
Abels served as Sylvia Plath's model for the editor Jay Cee in The Bell Jar. Her papers, including her correspondence with Porter, are held at the University of Maryland.
