= Sol Funaroff =

American poet (1911–1942)

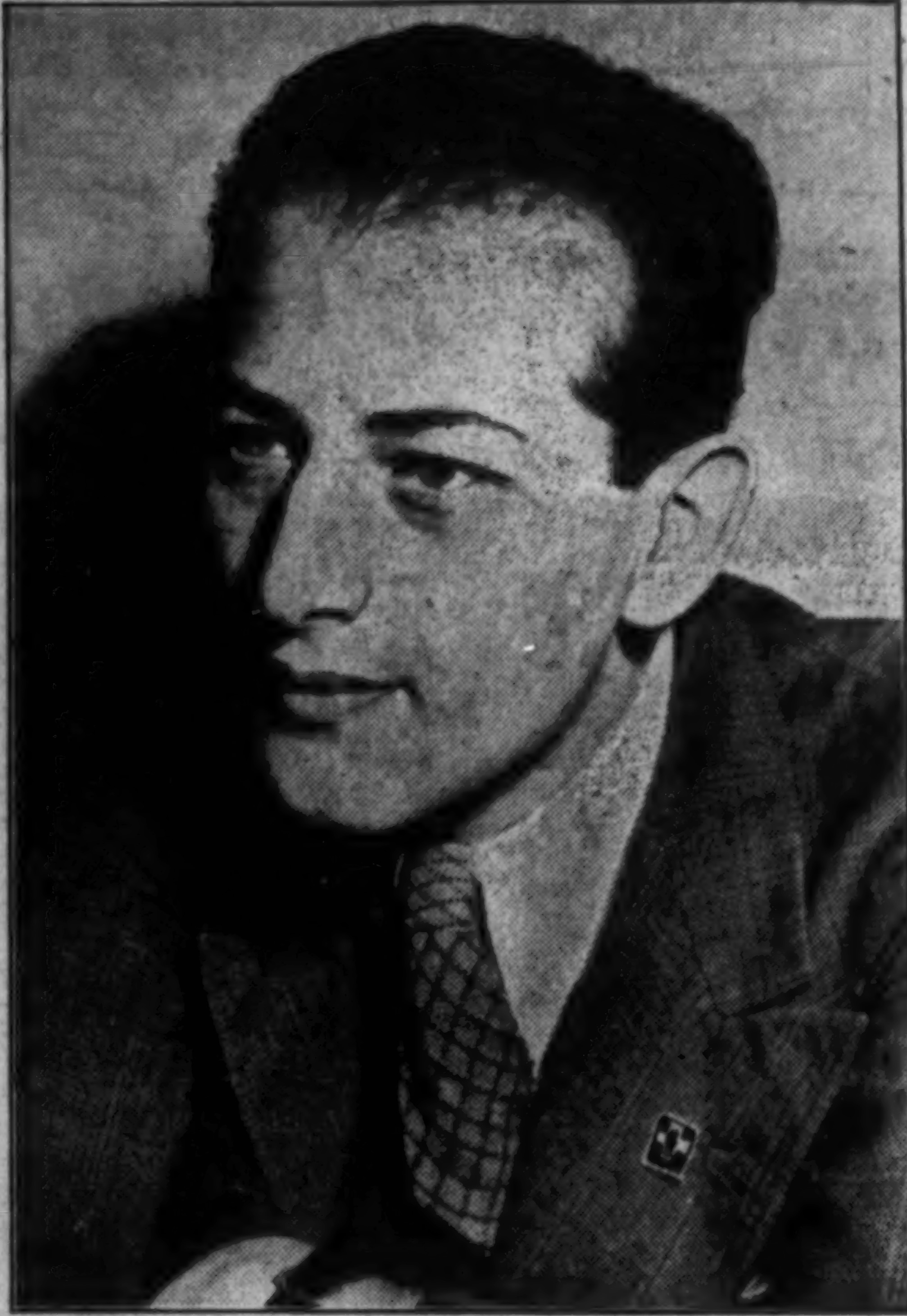

Sol Funaroff (May 1, 1911-October 29, 1942) was an American poet.

== Biography ==
Funaroff was born in Beirut, to a family of Russian Jewish immigrants. His family moved across several European countries before immigrating to New York. He was educated at Franklin Lane High School in Brooklyn, where he edited the high school literary magazine, and he later took evening courses at City College. At the beginning of his literary career he joined the John Reed Clubs, a group he later described as "instrumental in raising the battle-cry of proletarian art"

He was a follower of the Dynamo school of poetry, along with Muriel Rukeyser and Kenneth Fearing. In 1933, Funaroff founded Dynamo Press. The first book Funaroff published in the Dynamo Press poetry series was his friend Edwin Rolfe's book To My Contemporaries. In 1938, Funaroff worked on the Federal Writers' Project guidebook to New York City, collaborating on the book with Richard Wright and Maxwell Bodenheim.

In his poetry, Funaroff avoided abstract themes and focused on modern society and the depictions of the working class. In common with other poets of the Dynamo School, his works depict modern machinery as a symbol of progress and the improvement of humanity. In many works, he used assemblage to depict the lives of the American workers. Mike Gold described Funaroff's works as a combination of "abstract manifesto and personal lyricism". Funaroff's works used modernist techniques influenced by the cinematic montage "to visualize the social and political themes" of his works. Funaroff's Marxist politics made him critical of other prominent poets. Funaroff published "What the Thunder Said: A Fire Sermon", a 1938 parody of T.S. Eliot's The Waste Land, that used montage techniques in its depiction of Communist revolution. He also criticized the limited focus of William Carlos Williams, comparing him to a painter of miniatures, rather a muralist who could depict society on a large scale. Funaroff wrote that Objectivism lacked a purpose and an understanding of the capitalist roots of poverty.

Funaroff was active in the Keep America Out of War Committee, arranging a reading of anti-war poetry for the group. He also wrote the poem for Anna Sokolow's solo dance The Exile.

His funeral was organized by the International Workers Order and featured tributes from Samuel Sillen and Joy Davidman. Kenneth Rexroth wrote about Funaroff in his poem "Thou Shalt Not Kill", along with other dead poets from the 1930s, asking "What became of Jim Oppenheim? Where is Sol Funaroff?"

== Bibliography ==
- The Spider and the Clock. New York: International Publishers, 1938.
- Exile From a Future Time: The Posthumous Poems of Sol Funaroff. New York: Dynamo, 1943.
