= Federated Press =

Communist-leaning news service

In addition to providing weekly content to editors of the American labor press, the Federated press published a 12-page weekly newspaper available to subscribers and organized supporters.

The Federated Press was a left wing news service, established in 1920, that provided daily content to the radical and labor press in America, characterized widely from a mere "labor wire service" or "a kind of left-wing AP" to widely known for having "employed many Communist editors and correspondents," "so closely allied to the Communist party of America as to be regarded by the Communists as their official press association," or just "the Red's Federated Press."

== History ==
=== Federated Press ===
The People's Council of America, established in New York City in May 1917 and headed by Scott Nearing and Louis P. Lochner, produced a monthly publication called People's Council Bulletin, which featured international news with an emphasis on the doings of the peace movement. The editor of this publication was William E. Williams, press spokesman of the People's Council. This bulletin proved the inspiration for the International Labor News Service, itself a news agency for the radical press, as octogenarian Scott Nearing recounted in his 1972 memoirs:

One day... a big, sturdy chap just past middle age came into our New York People's Council office and showed credentials from the Western Metal Miners. He had been reading our Bulletin and liked the material, especially that dealing with international affairs. 'If you will put this material into a regular news service,' he told us, 'our organization will help pay for it and circulate it. Here is our first contribution' and he put a $20 bill on the desk.

In Milwaukee, Wisconsin, a similar concept was being tested by Edward J. Costello, Managing Editor of Victor Berger's socialist daily, the Milwaukee Leader. This news service, called the Federated Press, was founded on January 3, 1920, and was intended to supply copy to labor and radical newspapers around the country. The two news agencies decided to join forces under the Federated Press banner, with Costello holding down the post of Managing Editor of the Service and Lochner acting as Business Manager. Nearing provided the service with regular installments of his writing. The service grew steadily and was ultimately mailing news releases and picture mats five days a week to some 150 labor and radical publications. William F. Dunne was another co-founder.

In August 1920, conscientious objector and university instructor Carl Haessler was released from federal penitentiary after serving a two-year sentence. He took over the job of managing editor from Costello, who left the employment of the service. Haessler remained at this position until the service was terminated in the 1940s.

=== Federated Press League ===
On February 4, 1922, a "Federated Press League" (FPL) formed in Chicago to collect funds for the news service. Members of the league's executive board included: Robert M. Buck, Jack Carney, Arul Swabeck, Editor Feinburg, William Z. Foster (later CPUSA head), Carl Haessler, Mabel Search, Clark H. Getts, Louis P. Lochner, and Maude McCreery.

In 1923 during the trial of communist leader C. E. Ruthenberg in St. Joseph, Michigan, the government prosecutor spent considerable effort while cross-examining Jay Lovestone in establishing links between the Communist Party and the Federated Press. The prosecutor attempted to prove that all funding for the Federated Press came only from "Communist sources." Lovestone held the position that the Communist Party had tried to influence the Federated Press but had never controlled it. (In his 1952 memoir, Whittaker Chambers directly contradicts Lovestone by calling it the "communist-controlled news service of my Daily Worker days.")

Nearing continued to produce content for the Federated Press until 1943, when he was fired for his anti-war politics, which managing editor Haessler deemed to be "childish".

=== End of the Federated Press ===
Although it hit its peak just after the end of World War II, in 1949 the Congress of Industrial Organizations decided to purge more left wing unions and set up the Labor Press Association. Although short lived it attracted more conservative labor papers, who terminated their use of Federated Press's service.

The service was finally discontinued in 1956.

== Locations ==
The Federated Press had its headquarters at 156 W. Washington Street in Chicago (where it shared offices with the ACLU, the Chicago Committee for Struggle Against War, the Acme News Syndicate, and the Institute for Mortuary Research). It had bureaus in New York, San Francisco, and Washington DC (where it shared offices with the Soviet official news agency TASS).

The Federated Press had foreign bureaus in Berlin and Moscow.

== Clients ==
In 1922, newspapers that used Federated Press service included 23 in Illinois, 17 in New York, 7 in California, 5 in Minnesota, 4 in Washington, and some 2 dozen in the Midwest and New England.

== Communist Influence ==
A major client of the Federated Press was the Communist Party USA, which subscribed to feed its newspaper the Daily Worker, and the Federated Press was seen as having "many Communist editors and correspondents".

The extent of the Communist influence on Federated Press became an issue during Leland Olds failed renomination to the Chairmanship of the Federal Power Commission in 1949.

== Funding ==
- Garland Fund (administered by trustees headed by Roger Nash Baldwin of the American Civil Liberties Union)
- Robert Marshall Foundation, which also funded "Farm Research" by Harold Ware, founder of the Ware Group spy ring)

== People ==
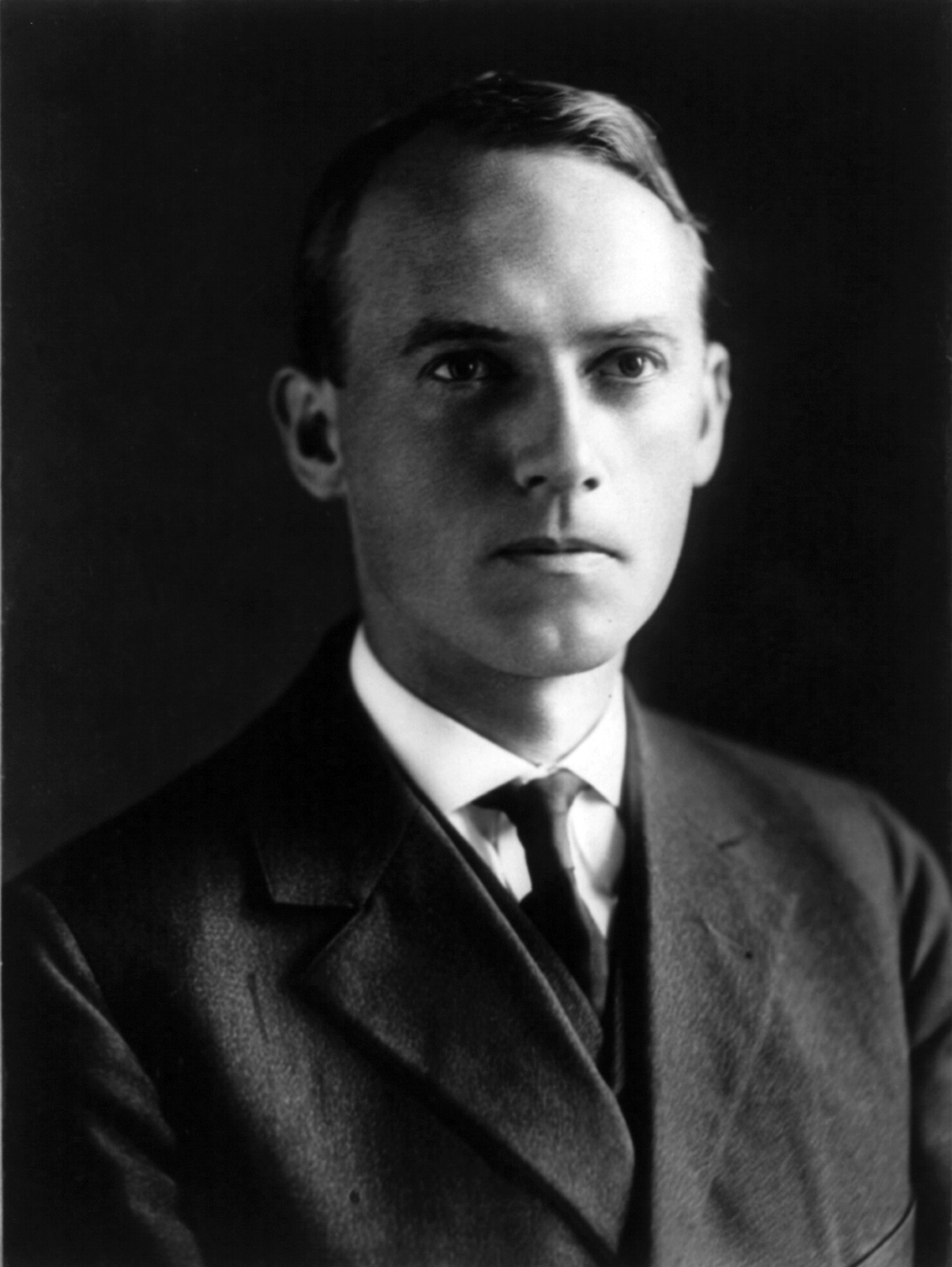
Scott Nearing (here, 1915) was a co-founder of the Federated Press

Founders:

- William Francis Dunne (CPUSA leader)
- Carl Haessler (Chicago Workers School)
- Louis Lochner (Milwaukee Leader)
- Scott Nearing

Editors:

- Helen Augur (1920)
- E.J. Costello (1921-1922)
- Carl Haessler (1922-1940)
- Leland Olds - Industrial Editor (1922-1929)

Bureau Chiefs:

- Louis P. Lochner (Berlin)
- Anna Louise Strong

Correspondents:

- Abner Carroll Binder
- Carl Braden
- Joe Carroll
- Albert F. Coyle (also editor of the Locomotive Engineers Journal)
- Horace B. Davis
- Len De Caux
- Miriam Allen deFord
- Robert W. Dunn
- William Z. Foster (later CPUSA head)
- Conrad Friberg
- Betty Friedan
- Ida Glatt (mother of John McCarthy (computer scientist))
- Travis K. Hedrick
- Fred C. Howe
- Grace Hutchins
- Stetson Kennedy ("Inside Out" column 1937-1950)
- Eugene Lyons
- Maud Leonard McCreery
- Alfred Maund
- Harvey O'Connor
- Jessie Lloyd O'Connor
- Frank L. Palmer
- Julia Ruuttila
- James Peck (pacifist)
- Marc Stone (brother of I.F. Stone
- Laurence Todd

== Legacy ==
Karla Kelling Sclater has stated:

The Federated Press has also been ignored in the historiography. A news-gathering cooperative, the Federated Press, which began in 1920, was the first news service that provided affiliated papers with international reports of interest to the working class. Jon Bekken states that the Federated Press survived into the early 1950s as the only independent news service that supplied information to 150 papers including newspapers in Germany, Russia and Australia. Labor, socialist, and other newspapers utilized the Federated Press. To date, only one unpublished master's thesis discusses Carl Haessler, one of the founders of the Federated Press wire service, and the Federated Press.

== Works ==
=== Federated Press Bulletin ===
The Federated Press published an English-language weekly Federated Press Bulletin out of Chicago from 1921 to 1925, of which Haessler was associate editor.

=== Labor Letter ===
The Federated Press published an English-language weekly Federated Press Labor Letter out of Chicago from 1925 to 1929.

=== Labor's News ===
The Federated Press published an English-language weekly Labor's News, successor to its Labor Letter, out of New York from 1929 to 1931.

=== Supported publications ===
By 1922, the Federated Press had helped establish eight weekly newspapers, including the South Bend (IN) Free Press, Centralia (IL) Labor World, Iowa Farm and Labor News, Producers Review (IL), Tri-City Labor News (Christopher, IL), The Labor Advocate (Racine, WI), and Cahoka Valley (IL) News.

Bérmunkás (The Wage Worker), Hungarian language newspaper, was affiliated with the Federated Press.

== See also ==
- Liberation News Service
- Underground Press Syndicate
