= Horace B. Davis =

American journalist (1898–1999)

Horace Bancroft Davis (August 15, 1898- June 28, 1999) was an American journalist and academic. Davis was born in 1898 in Newport, Rhode Island and began studies at Harvard University prior to the beginning of World War I. He refused to serve in the war and obtained conscientious objector status. Instead of fighting, he quit Harvard and volunteered with the recently formed American Friends Service Committee. Returning to Harvard, he graduated with a B.A. in 1921 and then worked as a steelworker. Before returning to receive his Ph.D. Davis taught at Southwestern College in Memphis, Tennessee from 1929 to 1930 and then wrote for the labor news agency Federated Press before resuming school. In 1934, he graduated from Columbia University with a Ph.D.

Leaving Columbia for Brazil, Davis relocated to São Paulo in 1933, where he taught at the Fundação Escola de Sociologia e Política, which later became part of the University of São Paulo. He returned to the United States in 1934 and joined the faculty at Simmons College in Boston from 1936 to 1941. During World War II, he performed research on behalf of the Congress of Industrial Organizations. In 1947, Davis was hired as an associate professor of economics at University of Missouri–Kansas City. Six years later in 1953, the anti-communist United States Senate Subcommittee on Internal Security subpoenaed Davis to testify because of suspected membership in Communist Party USA. He refused to testify and cited his Fifth Amendment right against self-incrimination. However, he was then dismissed by UMKC and blacklisted. From 1955 to 1957, he began teaching at historically black Benedict College in South Carolina. In 1963, Davis was hired at the newly founded University of Guyana, where he stayed until 1966 and eventually became a dean. He retired from academia in 1968 but continued publishing work until 1978.

Davis' son, Horace Chandler Davis, was born in 1926 and became a mathematician. Like his father, he also refused to testify when he was called before House Un-American Activities Committee and spent six months in prison.

He died slightly before his 101st birthday on June 28, 1999, at Illinois Masonic Medical Center.

== Publications ==
- The Condition of Labor in the American Iron and Steel Industry [i.e., Labor and Steel] (based on the author's Columbia University Ph.D. thesis), International Publishers, 1933.
- Labor and Steel, International Publishers, 1933.
- NRA: Fascismo e communismo, Edicoes Nosso Livro, 1934.
- Shoes: The Workers and the Industry, International Publishers, 1940.
- Nationalism & Socialism: Marxist and Labor Theories of Nationalism to 1917, Monthly Review, 1967.
- (Editor and translator) Rosa Luxemburg, The National Question: Selected Writings, Monthly Review Press, 1976.
- Towards a Marxist Theory of Nationalism, Monthly Review Press, 1978.
