= Myra Page =

American writer, union activist, and communist (1897–1993)

Dorothy Markey
- Born: Dorothy Page Gary; October 1, 1897; Newport News, Virginia, US
- Died: October 1993 (aged 95–96); Yonkers, New York, US
- Education: University of Richmond (BA); Columbia University (MA); University of Minnesota (PhD)
- Occupations: Writer; union activist; teacher
- Spouse: John Fordyce Markey
- Espionage activity
- Allegiance: Soviet Union
- Service branch: probably Comintern's "OMS"
- Service years: 1933–1940s?
- Rank: Unknown
- Codename: M. Burton (when writing for the AFT
- Operations: Couriers (money)
- Writing career
- Pen name: Myra Page
- Language: English
- Period: 1918–1964
- Genre: Proletkult
- Notable works: Gathering Storm (1932); Moscow Yankee (1935)
- Literary movement: Communist
- Website: finding-aids.lib.unc.edu/05143/

Dorothy Markey (born Dorothy Page Gary, 1897–1993), known by the pen name Myra Page, was a 20th-century American communist writer, journalist, union activist, and teacher.

== Background ==
Page was born Dorothy Page Gary on October 1, 1897, in Newport News, Virginia. Her father's ancestors, the Garys, came from Wales to the Tidewater region in 1720. Her mother's ancestors, the Barhams, came to Jamestown, Virginia. Her father Benjamin Roscoe Gary was a doctor, her mother Willie Alberta Barham an artist, and her home "affluent", "middle-class and progressive". Her brother Barham was a good friend of future Virginia Governor Colgate Darden.

In 1918, she received a Bachelor of Arts degree in English and History from Westhampton College (now the University of Richmond).

== Career ==
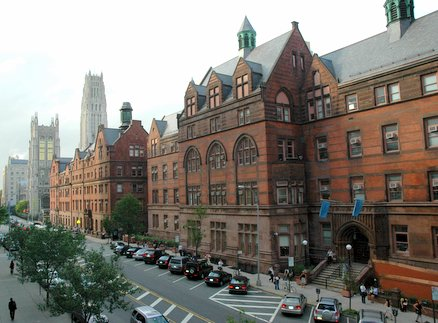
Teacher's College buildings on 120th Street, NYC, where Page attended classes

After teaching school in Richmond, Virginia, Page started graduate work in 1919 at Columbia University. She studied anthropology under Franz Boas, Melvin Herskovitz, and Franklin Giddings. Both Boas and Herskovitz "challenged the prevailing theories about racial hierarchies." She took a class under John Dewey at Columbia's Teacher's College and attended courses given by theologians Harry Emerson Fosdick and Henry F. Ward at Union Theological Seminary. She later said of this period in her life, "it was like a whole world opening up." She also sat in on a short story writing course taught by Helen Hunter. In 1920, Page earned an MA degree; her thesis analyzed the effects of New York newspaper coverage on the Spanish–American War.

=== 1920s ===
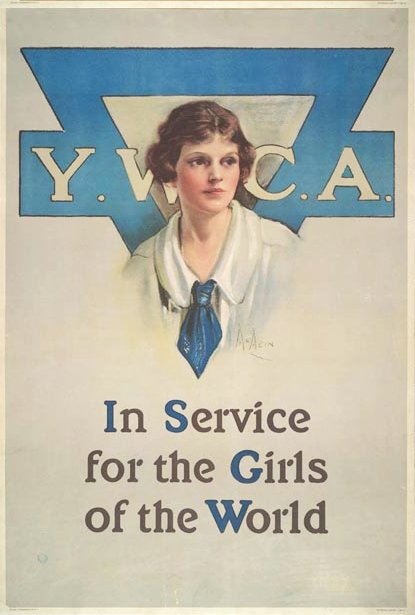
Poster for YWCA (1919), which Page supported

While still a graduate student, Page was active in the Young Women's Christian Association (YWCA), which at the time championed reform in race relations. Influenced by Social Gospel, she "developed an antiracist consciousness and chafed against the restrictions imposed upon her as a southern white woman." Upon completing her MA in 1920, she became a YWCA "industrial secretary" at a silk factory in Norfolk, Virginia, near her home town of Newport News. She organized education for women workers.

Giddings had introduced Page to the Rand School of Social Science, where she met Anna Louise Strong, Mary Heaton Vorse, and Scott Nearing. In 1921 she returned to New York from Norfolk, and studied further under Nearing at Rand. She was reading, for the first time, the Manifesto of the Communist Party by Karl Marx and Friedrich Engels.

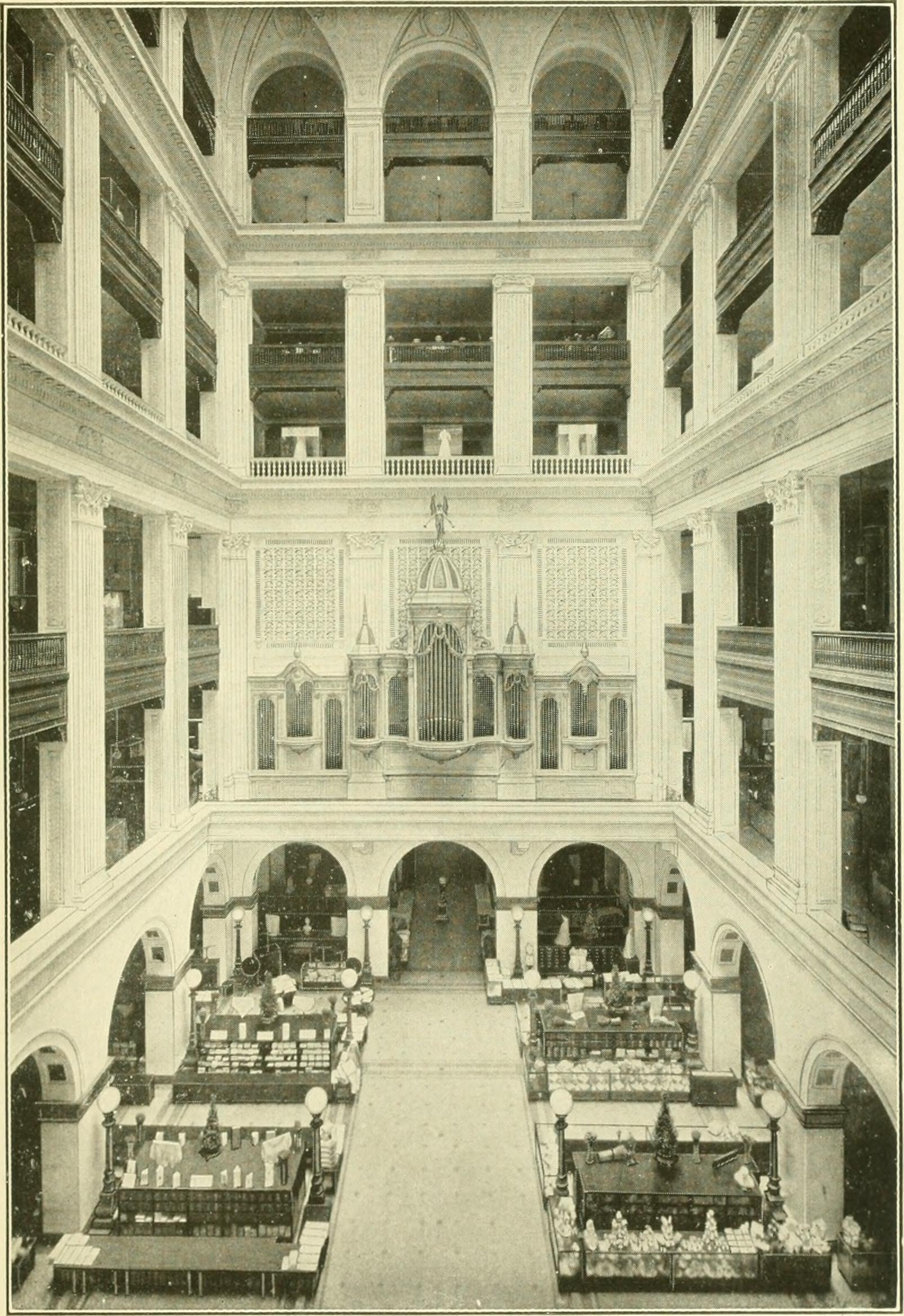
Grand Court with Organ at South End in Wanamaker's store (1917), where Page worked

Against her family's wishes, she took a factory job in Philadelphia and became a union organizer for the (then pro-communist) Amalgamated Clothing Workers Union (ACW). She chose Amalgamated for its progressivism and emphasis on education. She initially worked at a Wanamaker's department store. The union helped her get a job in a clothing sweatshop, where she participated in an ACW-led strike. She became a pants seamstress—good enough that the ACW sent her to New York City for training in making button holes. Next, she and others were sent to St. Louis, Missouri, to help unionize the city's biggest garment sweatshop, Curlee's. During a slump in 1923, she took a secretarial job and went home to Newport News for a few months. In the spring of 1924, she returned to the New York area and was hired as a schoolteacher of American history in Teaneck, New Jersey. There, "I joined the New York City Local of the American Federation of Teachers and quickly became one of its leaders."

In fall 1924, she got a teaching fellowship in the History Department of the University of Minnesota, chaired by F. Stuart Chapin. Pitirim Sorokin, former secretary to Alexander Kerensky and a Menshevik leader, was a professor there. She married fellow teacher John Markey, and together they joined the American Federation of Teachers (AFT) union. They both encouraged garment workers to unionize in the Twin Cities area (Minneapolis and St. Paul).

In June 1926, as a member of AFT, she attended a convention of the Trade Union Education League. Participants included William Z. Foster and John Jonstone. Also in June 1926, she took a class (Page and Nearing called it the Labor Research Study Group) under Nearing that sought a "law of social revolution" (though, according to Whittaker Chambers, "an infiltration of Communists... really ran the class, steered the discussions," and tried to "make the law of social revolution a Marxian law.") Nearing focused on the Soviet Union; Page wrote about India and the English Revolution of 1642. According to Whittaker Chambers (but not Page), their classmates included: Page, Chambers, Sam Krieger, Eve Dorf and her husband Ben Davidson, as well as Alfred J. Brooks, Dale Zysman, Benjamin Mandel, and Rachel Ragozin. In July–September, 1926, she attended first an International Teachers' Union conference in Vienna, Austria, several related teachers' union conferences in Paris, France, and then, with Nearing, a British trade union Conference in the UK. After passing through New York City, in part to publish her book with Nearing, The Law of Social Revolution, via the Federated Press, she returned to Minneapolis by late September to reunite with her husband. They immediately set about a "central trade union committee" of the Minnesota AFL and commenced "workers' education" in Duluth.

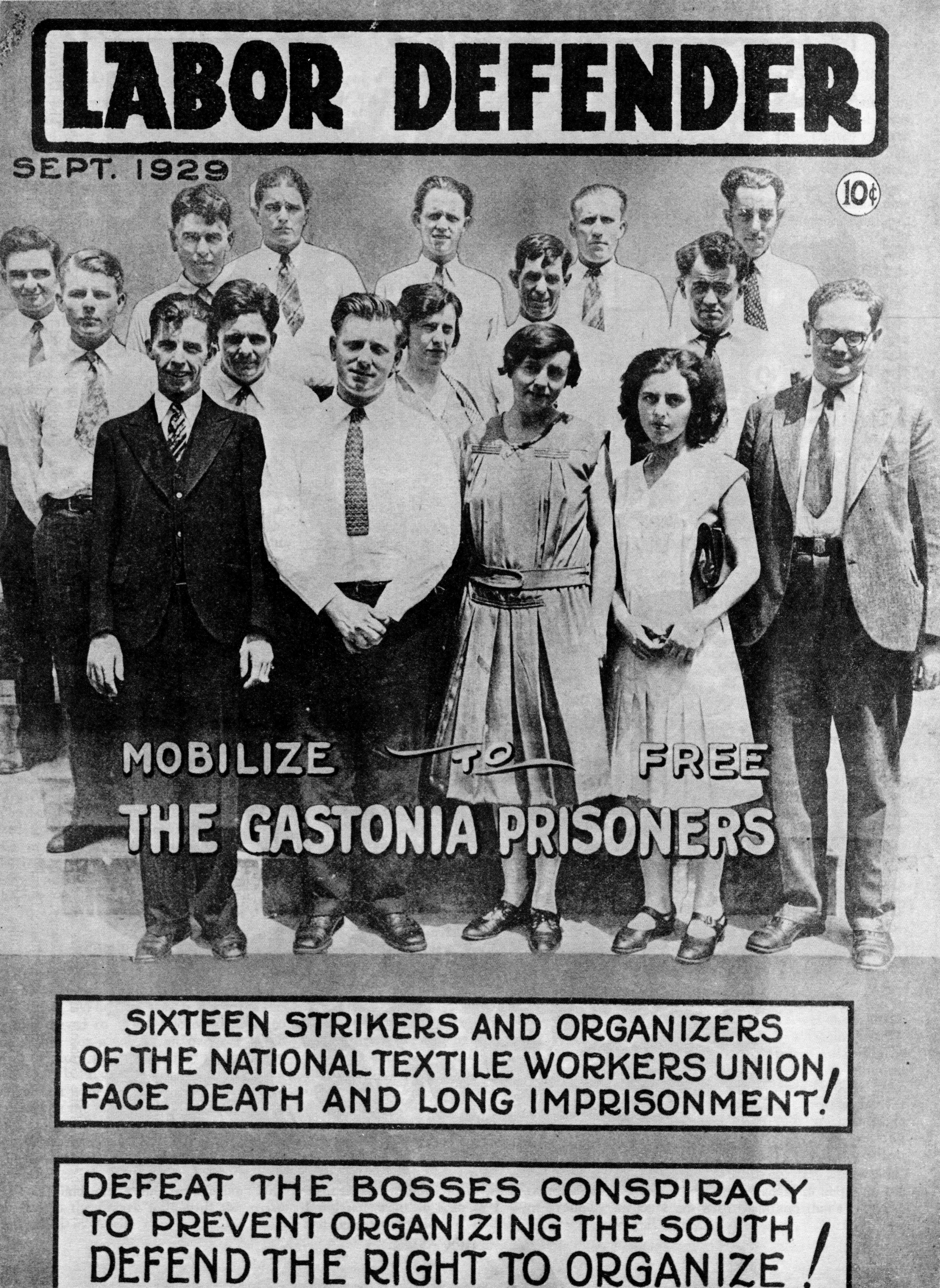
International Labor Defense's magazine depicts 16 prisoners from the Loray Mill strike, about which Page wrote the novel Gathering Storm

In June 1928, Page earned her PhD in sociology with double minor in Economics and Psychology from the University of Minnesota. In the fall of 1928, she accepted a teaching position at Wheaton College (Massachusetts), while her husband had started a teaching job a year earlier at Connecticut College. In 1926, the YWCA had helped fund her research into working conditions among garment workers in Greenville and Gastonia, North Carolina, and in 1929 again funded her to rewrite her doctoral thesis as Southern Cotton Mills and Labor (1929): "Many lines and quotes... appear later in my Gastonia novel, Gathering Storm."

On March 30, 1929, the Loray Mill strike (also known as the "Gastonia Strike") broke out and lasted into August; Sophie Melvin (future wife of Simon Gerson) traveled there to join Fred Beal in organizing strikers on behalf of the Communist Party controlled National Textile Workers Union. In fall 1929, her husband joined Wheaton College as head of her Sociology Department. In October 1929, Page was one of scores of founding members of the John Reed Clubs. Her "group" included: Grace Lumpkin, Katharine DuPre Lumpkin, Dorothy Douglas, Ben Appel, Sophie Appel (and probably Agnes Smedley who also knew most of these people). During the Wall Street Crash of 1929 that started October 28–29, 1929, Page had just started working as a journalist for Labor Age, the ILD's Labor Defender, and Southern Woman magazines. Some time in 1929, Page along with Lumpkin, Olive Dargin and three others began writing novels about the Gastonia Strike: Page's was called Gathering Storm: A Story of the Black Belt, published in 1932.

=== 1930s ===
New Pioneer monthly magazine for Communist children (1931–1938), published by Young Communist League USA, for which Page was editor

At the end of the 1929–1930 academic year, Page and her husband left Wheaton College. During the ensuing decade, she worked as a political journalist and writer. She wrote for Southern Workman, Working Woman, and the CPUSA newspaper The Daily Worker. In 1931, she became editor for the New Pioneer monthly magazine for Communist children (1931–1938), published by Young Communist League USA. She recruited her brother Barham and sister Bert to contribute stories. In May 1931 she traveled with William Z. Foster to hear him advocate that the National Miners' Union should go on strike while breaking away from the AFL. Page quarreled with Foster over his position, but she did include a piece about the strike in the July 1931 New Pioneer issue.

Page's husband John Markey joined the Labor Research Association (LRA), for which he contributed writings under the pseudonym "John Barnett". LRA's directors included Anna Rochester, Bill Dunne, Grace Hutchins, Carl Haessler, and Charlotte Todes Stern. Edward Dahlberg was another contributor. Page notes in her memoir that Markey "helped organize automotive and transportation workers. It was good experience and the workers liked him...but organizing was not his forté. He was always best at academic teaching and research." As "John Barnett", Markey also contributed articles to The Communist, 1933–1935.

Page spent two years in Moscow, whence she wrote for American socialist journals as well as for the Soviet communist publication Moscow News. She also gathered material for her novel Moscow Yankee (1935) while living there.

Upon their return to the States around November 1933, when the US recognized the USSR diplomatically, Page and her husband lived in Brooklyn, NY. She joined the editorial board of Soviet Russia Today, a Soviet-backed magazine edited by Jessica Smith, wife of Harold Ware.

On May 1, 1935, Page joined the League of American Writers (1935–1943), whose members included Alexander Trachtenberg of International Publishers, Frank Folsom, Louis Untermeyer, Bromfelds, I. F. Stone, Millen Brand, Arthur Miller, Lillian Hellman, and Dashiell Hammett. Members were largely either Communist Party members or fellow travelers. Aline Bernstein (mistress of Thomas Wolfe) often hosted them at her home.

Starting in August 1935, Page's husband spent a year (again as "John Barnett") as dean of Commonwealth College, a workers' school in Mena, Arkansas, while Page taught English writing and literature. Page met FLOTUS Eleanor Roosevelt when she came to visit the college.

In March 1937, she interviewed Andre Malraux for his views on the Spanish Civil War and Hallie Flanagan about the Federal Theatre Project.

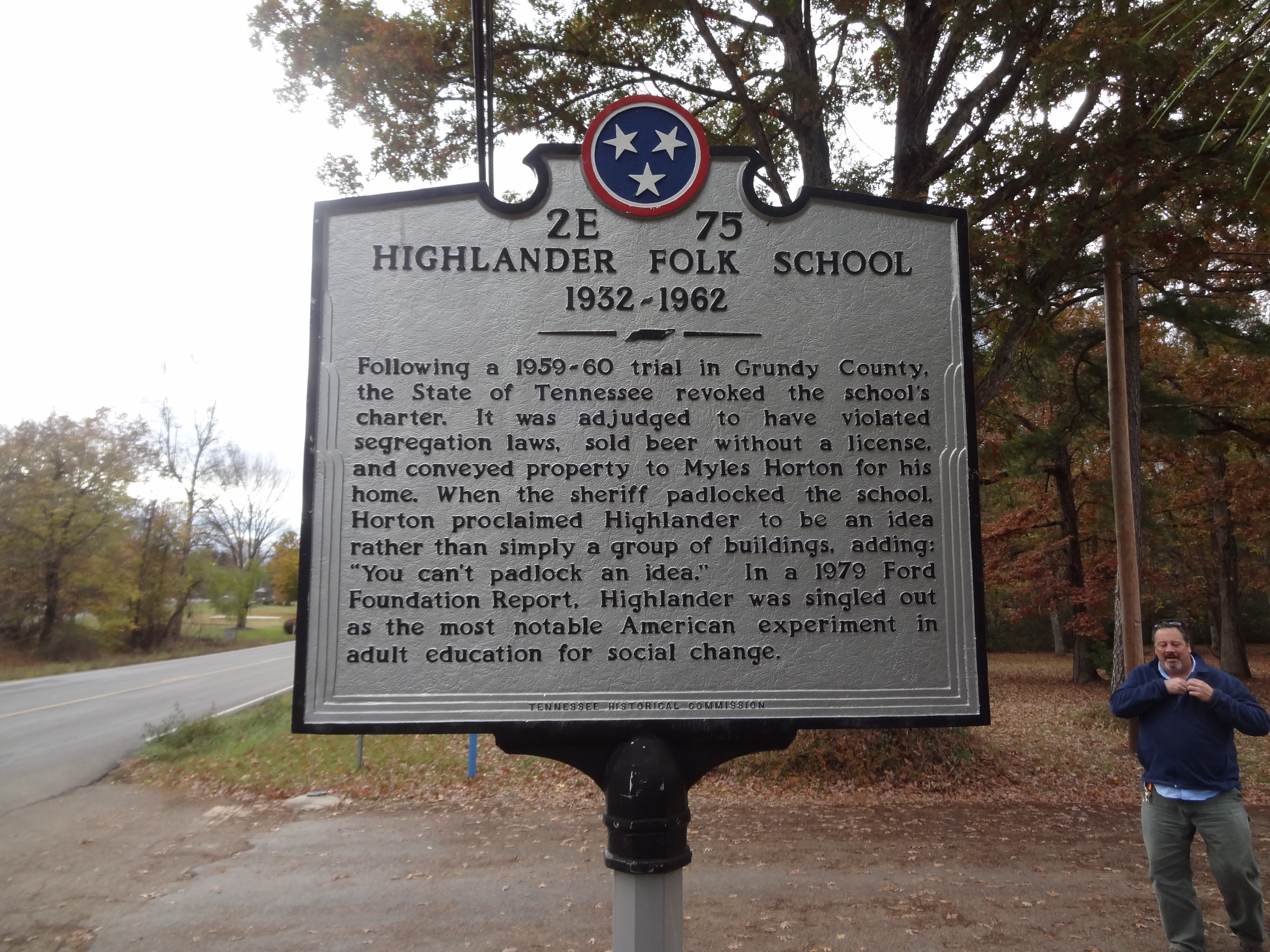
Historical Marker for Highlander Folk School (1932-1962), where Page taught in the 1930s

During the 1930s, Page also taught school at the Writer's School, underwritten by the League of American Writers (itself established by the Party) and based in New York City. In 1937, husband John Markey got a job as educational director of the Transportation Workers Union (TWU), a CIO member headed by Mike Quill. In the summers of 1938 and 1939, Page taught at the Highlander Folk School in Grundy County, Tennessee.

=== Later life ===
In the 1940s, she continued to teach at the Writer's School.

In the 1950s and 1960s, she wrote biographies for juveniles under her married name "Dorothy Markey."

== Communism ==
=== Party membership ===
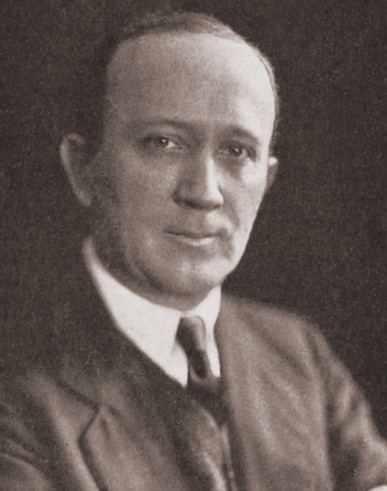
William Z. Foster (undated), whom Page supported amidst Party factional struggles in 1929

In her memoir In a Generous Spirit, Page states that both she and her husband were members of the nascent Communist Party of the USA. She does not state when, but from her description it seems they joined in 1928 during the height of factionalism within the Party between followers of Jay Lovestone, James P. Cannon, and William Z. Foster (described at some length in the memoir of Whittaker Chambers). Page states that she and her husband supported Foster because "he was a union man."

By the fall of 1930, after they had let their contracts to teach expire at Wheaton College, her husband "John and I began to work full-time for the movement," i.e., for the Party. In 1931, she became editor for the New Pioneer monthly magazine for Communist children (1931–1938), published by Young Communist League USA.

=== Moscow ===
Page and her husband first traveled to Moscow in the summer of 1928 (crossing Europe on foot), where they joined a group of visitors led by John Dewey. They went again in September 1931 by ship in the company of Gastonia strike leader Fred Beal of the National Textile Workers Union returning to Soviet exile after an undercover visit to the United States where, in 1929, he had been convicted in Gastonia for conspiracy in the strike related death of a policeman. Beal was later to write disaparagingly of those westerners who, like Page, were made comfortable in Moscow by the party-state bureaucracy he identified as a "new exploiting class".

Page stayed through mid-year 1933, by which time Beal in Kharkov, but not she in Moscow, witnessed the famine produced by Stalin's collectivisation policies.

=== Soviet espionage ===
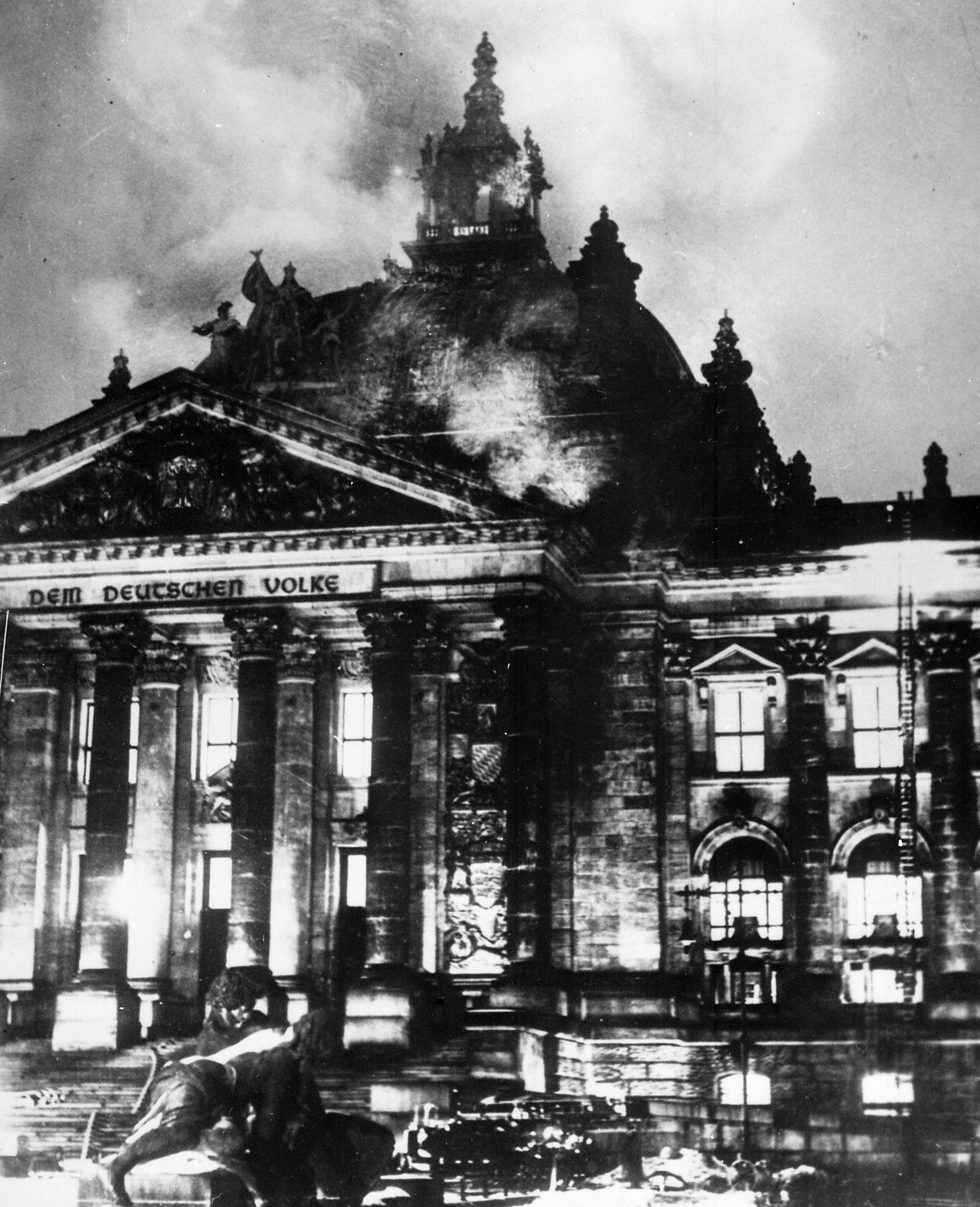
Firefighters struggle to extinguish the Reichstag Fire on February 27, 1933, which endangered the mission of Page's husband John Markey to Germany later that summer

In the same memoir, she states that they both worked in the Soviet underground, starting from their days in Russia (1932). She states that husband John Markey worked in agriculture and so came to meet and know Harold Ware (founder of the Ware Group which Whittaker Chambers took over upon Ware's death in 1935). Page is clear about joining the Soviet underground:

While we were in the Soviet Union, John and I worked with the worldwide underground movement against the fascists. We worked for whoever made contact with us that we trusted, in Moscow or outside the Soviet Union. Contacts in Moscow usually asked me to do a job, and if I wanted to do it I did it.

Page emphasized this last point by stating further, "I was never forced to do anything." She recounts a request while in Moscow for her to take money to China when traveling home, but she declined. The Soviets also asked her to stay in Moscow to help make a movie about America, but "the idea seemed crazy and I refused." During the summer of 1933, the Soviets also had her husband deliver money to Hamburg "for the underground" on his way home to America. (Apparently, the Soviets intended to have them make separate journeys home.) "When I said goodbye to John, I didn't know whether I would ever see him again... We did what we felt we had to do, and that included risking our lives." (The immediate risk Page is referring to was probably the 1933 Nazi takeover of Germany and immediate liquidation of the German Communist Party and its members, specifically the Reichstag Fire and resulting Reichstag Fire Decree of February 28, 1933.)

Most foreigners joined the Soviet underground via the Comintern's "International Liaison Department" or "OMS" (Russian-language acronym).

=== "Disillusionment" ===
During their second visit 1931–1933, Page claims to have not realized how privileged a life they led, living at the Lux Hotel and buying scarce good easily with valudas ("American-style paper money") instead of Soviet roubles. Louis Fischer discussed the current famine in Ukraine, but they dismissed him as a salaried newspaperman. "We didn't know about the horrors of collectivization because we chose not to know. Fischer was right, but we didn't believe him." She had not known about "the matter of the purges because the Soviets were covering up the facts.

During the early 1950s McCarthy Era, she notes "my work as a writer was interrupted." Viking Press canceled publication of her novel Daughter of Man, despite the support of editor Pascal Covici and book agents Mavis Macintosh and Elizabeth Otis (who also represented John Steinbeck among others). Eventually, Citadel Press published it under a new title, With Sun in Our Blood.

Page documents her departure from the Party:

I left the Party in 1953, having lost faith that it could do the job it was supposed to do. My disillusionment was gradual... Gradually, we just plain lost confidence in the party. Ever since the Amalgamated convention in Chicago in the early twenties... the Party seemed too quarrelsome and sectarian for me.

She also added nuance to her decision:

I'm resentful that people think we listened only to Moscow and that when Stalin was exposed by Khruschev we lost our idol and therefore quit the Path. Stalin was not the reason we left. He was part of our disillusionment, but he wan't the reason we got out. Party members were not so attached to the Soviet Union that the Khruschev revelations made them change their whole lives. That wasn't the way we saw the world; we saw the world mainly from the U.S. point of view because that was our experience.

(Note that Page dates her departure not to the 1956 "Secret Speech" by Nikita Khrushchev but to 1953, the height of the McCarthy Era.)

=== Naming names ===
Page never testified before any congressional or other committees during the McCarthy Era, though the FBI did interview her; they failed to connect "John Barnett" with John Markey, however. Friends of theirs who were subpoenaed to testify include: }. Friends who refused to testify include W. E. B. DuBois (who "died a member of the Communist party")

In her 1996 memoir (by which time most of her generation had died), she names scores of people she had known.

Page recounts only mild bitterness over fallings-out with some friends and does little scandal-mongering (e.g., the affairs of Party leader Earl Browder with Kitty Harris and eventual wife Raissa.)

== Personal life and death ==
In 1924 she met and later married fellow teacher/fellow John Fordyce Markey (July 27, 1898 – May 14, 1991) from West Virginia coal country. She had two children, daughter Dorothy May Markey ("May", born April 21, 1935, wife of Stefan Kanfer) and adopted son John Ross Markey.

By the "late 1920s", she chose the pen name "Myra Page" (after a cousin with the same name) because:

I could be freer in what I wrote without a name that would be immediately identified with my parents... Another reason for the pen name was that I couldn't very well teach sociology in a university and write radical journalism and fiction at the same time... I could teach as Dorothy Gary and write as Myra Page. Only later during the McCarthy period did I begin to write again under my real name.

"Myra Page" likely first appeared in print in 1926. The transformation continued in the first edition of Gathering Storm, where the author is listed as "Dorothy Myra Page". (By the 1930s, husband John Markey also adopted a pen name as "John Barnett": "the Party advised him to use a pseudonym so he could resume a regular teaching career.")

Page died in October 1993 in Yonkers, New York.

== Legacy ==
The University of North Carolina at Chapel Hill has archived Page's papers.

University of Maine English professor Christina Looper Baker (August 18, 1939 – January 13, 2013) wrote a 210-page memoir from interviews and papers called In a Generous Spirit: A First-Person Biography of Myra Page (Urbana: University of Illinois Press, 1996).

== Works ==
In her posthumously published memoir, Page describes the anger she felt during childhood when witnessing racial discrimination of her Black friends. She wrote about this experience in her first published piece, "Colorblind" (c. 1920), included in The Crisis magazine by its editor and Page's future friend W. E. B. DuBois while she was studying at Columbia.

In the late 1920s and early '30s, Page became one of the dozens of American communist authors who embraced "Proletkult" (which, after Stalin came to full power, emerged as "Socialist Realism"), advocated in the US by New Masses editor-in-chief Mike Gold.

Of her works, Gathering Storm (1932) was significant both as a proletarian novel and an expression of the "Black Belt thesis". In Moscow Yankee (1935), she chronicles an unemployed Detroit autoworker who emigrates to the Soviet Union for a chance to work. She set herself the ambitious task of depicting Soviet life during the first five-year plan: "I did not see the novel as propaganda", she later said of it. Instead, she included it among a group of works on Gastonia, particularly by women. She regarded Mary Heaton Vorse's Gastonia (1929) as more reportage than novel. She considered Call Home the Heart by Olive Tilford Dargan (published under pen name "Fielding Burke") as well-written though romanticized. She viewed Grace Lumpkin's book To Make My Bread as equal to her own because they both "wrote from the same orientation" as Southern women who had seen poverty.

In the 1940s, Page published no additional works of fiction. Her last novel, With the Sun in Our Blood (1950), was drafted during the 1930s after transcribing an oral history by Dolly Hawkins, whom Page had known while they both were organizers in Arkansas.

Novels:

- Southern Cotton Mills and Labor, introduced by Bill Dunne (1929)
- Gathering Storm: A Story of the Black Belt (as "Dorothy Myra Page") (1932)
- Soviet Main Street with photography by Abram Pogovsky (Soyuzphoto) (1933)
- Moscow Yankee (1935, 1995)
- With Sun in Our Blood (1950)
  - Reissue: Daughter of the Hills: A Woman's Part in the Coal Miners' Struggle, introduced by Alice Kessler-Harris and Paul Lauter, afterword by Deborah S. Rosenfelt (1950, 1986)

Short stories, chapters, articles:

- "American Working Women," Workers' News (Fall 1934)
- "Leave Them Meters Be," Workers' News (Fall 1934)
- "Water," Workers' News (Fall 1934)
- "The Girl Who Was Afraid," Southern Worker (1934)
- "Men in Chains," The Nation (as "Myra Page") (1935)
- "Pickets and Slippery Sticks", chapter in New Pioneer Story Book (1935)

Juvenile Biographies:

- The Little Giant of Schenectady: Charles Steinmetz (1956) (as Dorothy Markey)
- Explorer of Sound: Michael Pupin (1964) (as Dorothy Markey)

Articles, Chapters:

- "Colorblind", The Crisis magazine (c. 1920) (as "Dorothy Gary")
- "The Developing Study of Culture" (as "Dorothy P. Gary"), Trends in American Sociology (1929)
- "Bourgeois Apologists and the South" (reviews), The Communist (September 1930)
- "Grey-Wash" (review), The Communist (May 1931)
- "The Cropper Prepares", The New Masses (February 11, 1936)
- "Malraux on Spain", Daily Worker (March 7, 1937)
- "Hallie Flanagan," (publication unknown) (c. 1937)
- "Cardenas Speaks for Mexico", The New Masses (August 30, 1938)
- "Cornish Miners (review), The New Masses (November 18, 1941)
- "Farm Saga" (review) Myra Page, The New Masses (March 3, 1942)

Autobiography:

- In a Generous Spirit: A First-Person Biography of Myra Page with Christina Looper Baker (1996)

== See also ==
- Stefan Kanfer
- Grace Lumpkin
- Esther Shemitz
- Whittaker Chambers
- Wanda Gag
- Marguerite Young (journalist)
- Proletkult

== External sources ==
- Wisconsin Historical Society: undated photo of Myra Page
- Marxists.org, Women Authors, Myra Page (includes photo)
- Those Good Gertrudes A Social History of Women Teachers in America - Author's Annotated Introduction to Manuscript Collections
- Myra Page Papers, 1910-1990 at the University of North Carolina at Chapel Hill
