= Barbara Shollar =

American murder victim

Barbara Shollar was an American education consultant, editor, and activist. For some time, she also taught writing at the Queens College of the City University of New York. With Marian Arkin, she had edited several books on tutoring, and the Longman Anthology of World literature by women (1989). For her PhD, she worked on the immigrant woman's autobiographical tradition. As a part of her doctoral research, she interviewed female memoirists, including writer and poet Pauline Leader.

On December 24, 2004, she was shot dead by her longtime life partner Helen Chumbley in the backyard of their home in Yonkers.
