= Louis Untermeyer =

American poet (1885–1977)

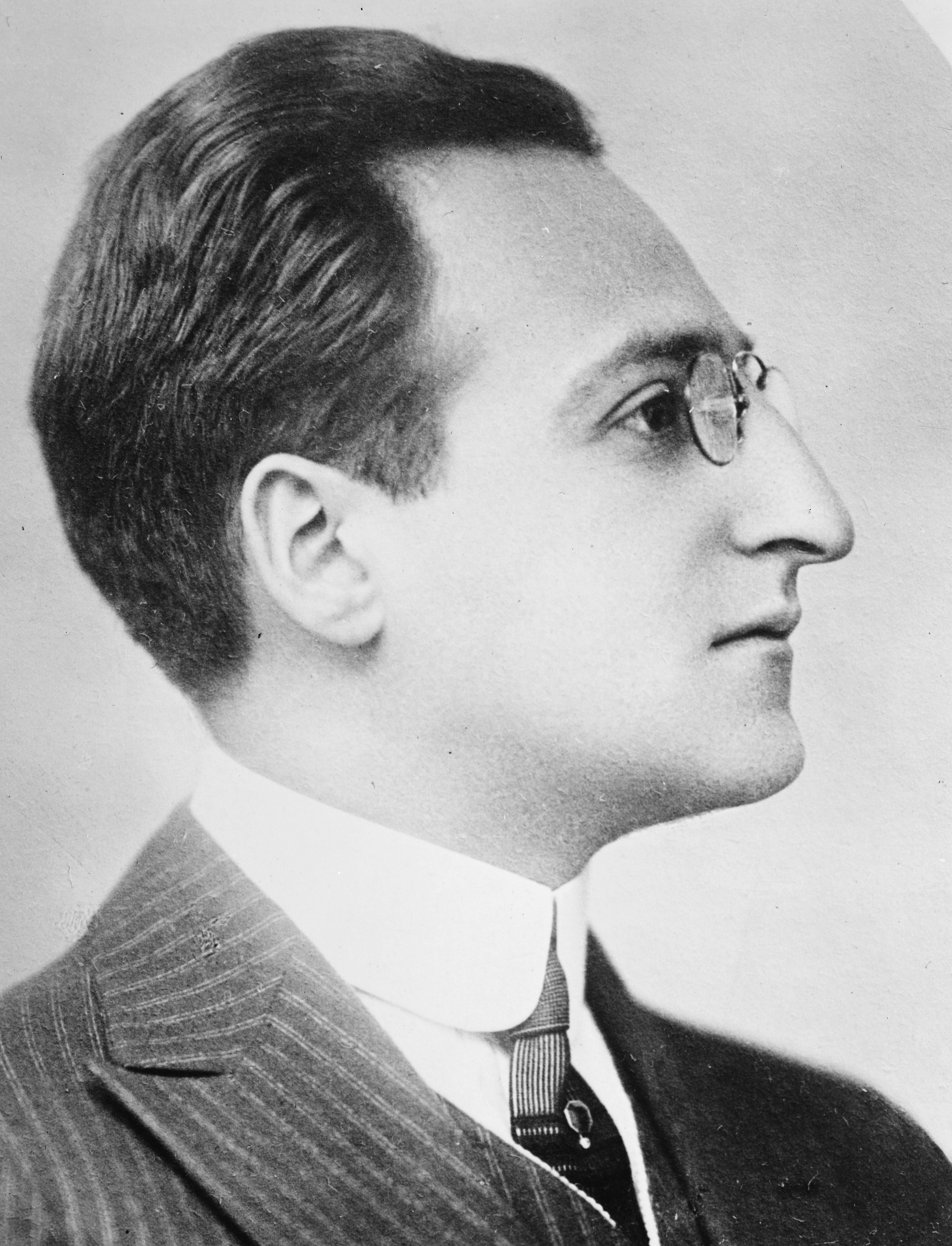
- Born: Louis Michael Untermeyer; October 1, 1885; New York City, New York, U.S.
- Died: December 18, 1977 (aged 92); Newtown, Connecticut, U.S.
- Occupations: Author; anthologist; editor; poet
- Spouses: Jean Starr (1906–26; divorced); Virginia Moore (1927–29; divorced); Jean Starr (1929–30; divorced again); Esther Antin (1931–45; divorced); Bryna Ivens (1948–77; widowed)

Louis Michael Untermeyer (October 1, 1885 – December 18, 1977) was an American poet, anthologist, critic, and editor. He was appointed the fourteenth Consultant in Poetry to the Library of Congress in 1961.

== Life and career ==
Untermeyer was born in New York City, the son of Emanuel, German-Jewish jewelry manufacturer, and Julia Michael Untermeyer. He initially joined his father's firm as a designer, rising to the rank of vice president, before resigning from the firm in 1923 to devote himself to literary pursuits. He was, for the most part, self-educated.

He married Jean Starr in January 1907, and their son Richard was born in December of that year. (Richard Untermeyer died by suicide in January 1927 while studying at Yale, at the age of 19.) After a 1926 divorce, they were reunited in 1929, after which they adopted two sons, Laurence and Joseph. He married the poet Virginia Moore (1903–1993) in 1927; their son, John Moore Untermeyer (1928), was renamed John Fitzallen Moore after a painful 1929 divorce. In the 1930s, he divorced Jean Starr Untermeyer and married Esther Antin (1894–1983). This relationship also ended in divorce in 1945. In 1948, he married Bryna Ivens, an editor of Seventeen magazine.

Untermeyer's first book of poetry, First Love (1911), reflected the influences of Heinrich Heine and British poet Laurence Housman. His next collection, Challenge (1914), showed his growing maturity as a poet.

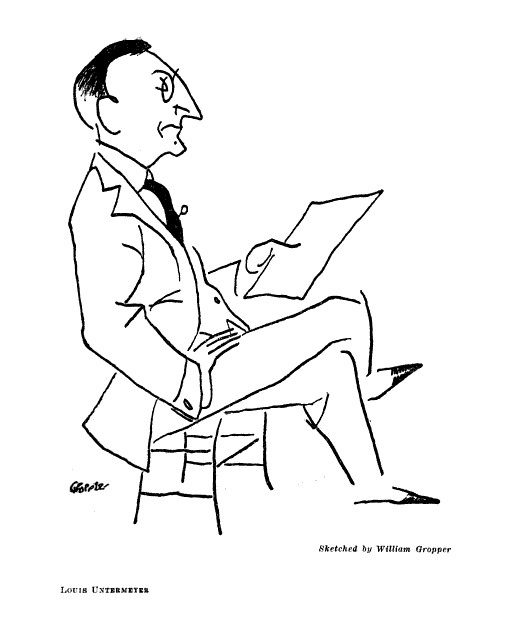
Caricature by William Gropper, 1921

Untermeyer was known for his wit and his love of puns. For a while, he held Marxist beliefs, writing for magazines such as The Masses, through which he advocated that the United States stay out of World War I. After the suppression of that magazine by the U.S. government, he joined The Liberator, published by the Workers Party of America. Later he wrote for the independent socialist magazine The New Masses. He was a co-founder, in 1916, of The Seven Arts, a poetry magazine that is credited for introducing many new poets, including Robert Frost, who became Untermeyer's long-term friend and correspondent.

On May 1, 1935, Untermeyer joined the League of American Writers (1935–1943), whose members included Lillian Hellman, Dashiell Hammett, Frank Folsom, Alexander Trachtenberg, I.F. Stone, Myra Page, Millen Brand, and Arthur Miller. (Members were largely either Communist Party members or fellow travelers.)

In 1950, Untermeyer was a panelist during the first year of What's My Line?, the popular television quiz program. According to Bennett Cerf, Untermeyer would sign virtually any piece of paper that someone placed in front of him, and Untermeyer inadvertently signed a few Communist proclamations. According to Cerf, Untermeyer was not a communist, but he had joined several suspect societies that drew attention to him. He was named during the hearings by the House Committee on Un-American Activities investigating communist subversion. The Catholic War Veterans and right-wing organizations began hounding Untermeyer. Goodson-Todman, producer of What's My Line?, did not act on the protests against Untermeyer for some time but finally, war veterans began picketing the CBS television studios in New York City where What's My Line? was broadcast. The pressure became too great, and the sponsor Jules Montenier, inventor of Stopette deodorant, said, "After all, I'm paying a lot of money for this. I can't afford to have my product picketed."

At that point, the producers fired Untermeyer from What's My Line?. His last appearance on the program was on March 11, 1951, with special mystery guest, actress Celeste Holm. The kinescope of this episode has been lost. His firing led to Bennett Cerf becoming a permanent panelist on the program.

The controversy surrounding Untermeyer led to him being blacklisted by the television industry. According to Untermeyer's friend Arthur Miller, Untermeyer became so depressed by his forced departure from What's My Line? that he refused to leave his home in Brooklyn for more than a year, and his wife Bryna answered all incoming phone calls. It was she who eventually told Miller what had happened because Untermeyer would not pick up the phone to talk to him, even though Miller's support of blacklisted writers and radio and television personalities was well-known to Untermeyer and many others. But for more than a year, whenever Miller dialed the Untermeyers' phone number, Bryna "talked obscurely about [her husband Louis] not wanting phone conversations anymore, preferring to wait until we could all get together again," wrote Miller.

According to Miller in his 1987 autobiography, he was a "very infrequent television watcher" in 1951 and did not notice that Bennett Cerf had replaced Untermeyer on What's My Line?. Miller did read the New York City newspapers regularly but apparently there were no published reports of Untermeyer's disappearance from the program, so Miller was unaware that anything was wrong until Untermeyer's wife, Bryna, eventually revealed what the problem was. After that, Untermeyer regularly conversed with Miller by phone for more than a year.

Louis Untermeyer was the author or editor of close to 100 books, from 1911 until his death. Many of them and his other memorabilia are preserved in a special section of the Lilly Library at Indiana University. Schools used his Modern American and British poetry books widely, and they often introduced college students to poetry. He and Bryna Ivens Untermeyer created a number of books for young people, under the Golden Treasury of Children's Literature. Untermeyer also rounded up contributors for a Modern Masters for Children series published by Crowell-Collier Press in the 1960s—the books were designed to have a vocabulary of 800 words and contributors included Robert Graves, Phylis McGinley, and Shirley Jackson. He lectured on literature for many years, both in the US and other countries. In 1956 the Poetry Society of America awarded Untermeyer a Gold Medal. He also served as the Consultant in Poetry to the Library of Congress from 1961 until 1963.

== Selected bibliography ==
=== Poetry collections ===
- The Younger Quire (parodies), Mood Publishing, 1911.
- First Love: A Lyric Sequence, Sherman, French & Co., 1911.
- Challenge, Century, 1914.
- These Times, Holt, 1917.
- Including Horace, Harcourt, 1919.
- The New Adam, Harcourt, 1920.
- Roast Leviathan, Harcourt, 1923, reprinted, Arno, 1975.
  - (With son, Richard Untermeyer) Poems, privately printed, 1927.
- Burning Bush, Harcourt, 1928.
- Adirondack Cycle, Random House, 1929.
- Food and Drink, Harcourt, 1932.
- First Words before Spring, Knopf, 1933.
- Selected Poems and Parodies, Harcourt, 1935.
- For You with Love (juvenile), Golden Press, 1961.
- Long Feud: Selected Poems, Harcourt, 1962.
- One and One and One (juvenile), Crowell-Collier, 1962.
- This Is Your Day (juvenile), Golden Press, 1964.
- Labyrinth of Love, Simon & Schuster, 1965.
- Thanks: A Poem (juvenile), Odyssey, 1965.
- Thinking of You (juvenile), Golden Press, 1968.
- A Friend Indeed, Golden Press, 1968.
- You: A Poem, (juvenile), illustrations by Martha Alexander, Golden Press, 1969.

=== Autobiography ===
- From Another World (1935)
- Bygones (1965)

=== Essay collections ===
- The New Era in American Poetry (1919)
- American Poetry Since 1900 (1923)
- The Forms Of Poetry (1926)
- Play in Poetry (1938)
- Doorways to Poetry (1938)
- The Lowest Form of Wit (1947)
- The Pursuit of Poetry (1969)

=== Critical collections ===
- The Poems of Henry Wadsworth Longfellow (1943)
- The Poetry and Prose of Walt Whitman (1949)
- The Letters of Robert Frost to Louis Untermeyer (1963)
- The Love Poems of Elizabeth and Robert Browning (1994)
- The Love Poems of Robert Herrick and John Donne (1948)

=== Fictional volumes ===
- Moses (1923)
- The Fat of the Cat and Other Stories (1925, adapted by Untermeyer)
- The Donkey of God and Other Stories (1932)
- The Kitten Who Barked (1962), illustrator: Lilian Obligado
- The Second Christmas (1961), illustrator: Louis Marak
- Cat O' Nine Tales (1971), illustrator: Lawrence DiFiori
- The Dog of Pompeii(1915)

=== Biography ===
- Heinrich Heine: Paradox and Poet (1937)
- Lives of the Poets: The story of one thousand years of English and American poetry (1972)
- Makers of the Modern World (with John Moore) (1955)
- Makers of the Modern World selections, Japanese translation (1971)

=== Anthologies, as editor or compiler ===
- Modern American Poetry (1919) (2nd edition, 1921; 6th edition, 1942)
- Modern British Poetry (1920) (5th edition, 1942)
- Modern American and British Poetry (1919)
- This Singing World (1923)
- Yesterday and Today (1926)
- New Songs for New Voices (1928), with Clara and David Mannes, illustrator: Peggy Bacon
- A Treasury of Great Poems (1942, 1955)
- The Golden Treasury of Poetry (1959), illustrator: Joan Walsh Anglund
- Story Poems (1946, 1972)
- Early American Poets (1952)
- An Uninhibited Treasury of Erotic Poetry (1963)
- A Galaxy of Verse (1978)
- Men and Women: the Poetry of Love (1970), illustrator: Robert J. Lee
- Collins Albatross Book of Verse (1933, 1960)
- Stars To Steer By (1941)
- Lots of Limericks (1961), illustrator: R. Taylor
- The Book of Living Verse (1932, 1945)
- Rainbow in the Sky (1935), illustrator: Reginald Birch
- A Treasury of Laughter (1946)
- An Anthology of New England Poets (1948)
- The Best Humor of 1949-1950 (with Ralph E. Shikes, 1950)
- The Best Humor Annual (with Ralph E. Shikes, 1951)
- The Best Humor Annual (with Ralph E. Shikes, 1952)
- The Magic Circle (1952)
- A Treasury of Ribaldry (1956)
- The Britannica Library of Great American Writing (1960)
- Big and Little Creatures (1961), with Bryna Ivens Untermeyer
- Beloved Tales (1962), with Bryna Ivens Untermeyer
- Old Friends and Lasting favorites (1962), with Bryna Ivens Untermeyer
- Fun and Fancy (1962), with Bryna Ivens Untermeyer
- Creatures Wild and Tame (1963), with Bryna Ivens Untermeyer
- Love Sonnets (1964), with Ben Shahn
- Love Lyrics (1964), with Antonio Frasconi
- The Golden Book of Poems for the Very Young (1971)
- A Treasury of Great Humor (1972)

=== Adapted or translated books ===
- Poems of Heinrich Heine (1917)
- The Wonderful Adventures of Paul Bunyan (1946), illustrator: Everett Gee Jackson
- More French Fairy Tales (1946), illustrator: Gustave Doré
- Cyrano de Bergerac (1954), illustrator: Pierre Brissaud
- Aesop's Fables (1965), illustrator: A. and M. Provensen
- Songs of Joy from the Book of Psalms (1967), illustrator: Joan Berg Victor
- Tales from the Ballet (1968), illustrator: A. and M. Provensen
- A Time for Peace (1969), illustrator: Joan Berg Victor
- The World's Great Stories (1964)
- The Firebringer (1968)
- Lines to a Pomeranian Puppy Valued at $3500 (1950), musical adaptation of Untermeyer poem by Irving Ravin
