= Millen Brand =

American writer and poet

- Brand in the 1930s
- Born: January 19, 1906; Jersey City, New Jersey
- Died: March 19, 1980 (aged 74)
- Education: Columbia University
- Occupations: Novelist, screenwriter, poet
- Spouse(s): Pauline Leader, Helen Mendelssohn
- Children: 4
- Writing career
- Years active: 50
- Notable works: The Outward Room, Savage Sleep, Local Lives

Millen Brand (January 19, 1906 – March 19, 1980) was an American writer and poet. His novels, The Outward Room (1938) and Savage Sleep (1968), addressed mental health institutions and were bestsellers in their day.

== Personal life ==
Brand was born on January 19, 1906, in Jersey City, New Jersey, into a working-class family. His father was a freelance electrician and his mother was a nurse. His mother was of Pennsylvania Dutch descent. His maternal grandfather was a carpenter and his paternal grandfather was a farmer. Brand's father bought a farm in 1906, which led to his cessation of attendance in school, because he preferred doing farm chores. He and his parents moved back to the city after a few years because farming was not financially viable. He resided in Greenwich Village and on a small farm in Bally, Pennsylvania. He married twice; first to Pauline Leader, a poet noted for her memoir about growing up deaf, And No Birds Sing, and then to Helen Mendelssohn (both marriages ended in divorce). He had three children by his first marriage and one by his second.

== Career ==
After receiving a B.A. and B.Litt. (journalism) from Columbia University, Brand worked as a copywriter for the New York Telephone Company 1929–1937.

In 1935, Brand joined the League of American Writers (1935–1943), whose members included Alexander Trachtenberg, Frank Folsom, Louis Untermeyer, I.F. Stone, Myra Page, Arthur Miller, Lillian Hellman, and Dashiell Hammett. Members were sympathetic to the U.S. Communist Party.

In New York City, Brand and Pauline Leader lived in a milieu of artists, writers, and political activists. Writers often based characters on their friends, and painters portrayed people they knew. For example, the painter Alice Neal lived around the corner from Brand and her psychiatric hospitalization influenced Brand's novel "The Outward Room" (see below). Her house became the setting for the New York portion of that book and two of its residents were later actors who appeared in its stage adaptation. Neel, who painted a portrait of Brand, was also the basis of the character Rose Hallis in Brand's 1959 novel Some Love, Some Hunger. Another notable acquaintance was the eccentric author, Joe Gould.

In 1937, Brand wrote his first novel,The Outward Room. It was a Book of the Month Club selection and critical success that sold more than half a million copies. It was translated into six languages, made into a Broadway play (The World We Made), a radio drama, and a TV play starring a young Charlton Heston. The Outward Room was the story of a young psychiatric patient named Harriet, who was hospitalized in upstate New York. After seven years of treatment, she fled a locked ward and escaped to New York City. Unable to find a job, she was rescued by a young machinist and union activist named John, with whom she moved in, fell in love, and then married. True to Brand's Marxist viewpoint, Harriet was cured of her illness through her relationship with John, her immersion in working class life, and her contact with the simple but honest people of the Lower East Side. Although Harriet's illness was caused by childhood trauma and an Electra complex––resolved on the final page of the book––this Freudian subplot was accepted by readers and critics without comment.

Critics praised the beauty of the book's writing, regarding a man and woman sheltering each other and trying to connect in the midst of the Depression. Mental illness, it suggested, is a form of alienation. While the medical authorities have insights into sanity and insanity, they cannot reach fearful patients and supply the necessary healing relationship. As Eleanor Roosevelt noted after seeing the theatrical version, Brand's important message was "that suffering comes to everyone and the important thing... is how you take it and what you contribute ...when other people suffer."

In the 1940s, Brand was a popular instructor in the University of New Hampshire's summer writing program and taught writing at NYU.

During WWII, Brand was a copywriter for the Office of Civilian Defense, where his writing of "to-do manuals" won the approval of author and Brand's fellow writing instructor, John Gould.

In 1948 Brand was nominated for an Oscar for Best Writing (Screenplay) for The Snake Pit (with Frank Partos), an adaptation of Mary Jane Ward's novel, which like his novel, The Outward Room, involved confinement in a mental health institution. In the process of writing the screenplay, Brand became friends with Mary Jane Ward and acquainted with prominent psychiatrists in the U.S. who gave advice on the screenplay. At a special showing of the film in New York City, an audience of psychiatrists praised the screenplay and the film.

In 1948, director Edward Dmytryk and writer-producer Adrian Scott formed a corporation to turn Brand's novel Albert Spears into a motion picture (it dealt with an African American family moving into a white, New Jersey neighborhood). Those plans fell through because of the Hollywood Black List and both Scott and Dmytryk were imprisoned for their refusal to cooperate with the House Un-American Activities Committee (HUAC) .

Brand met the psychiatrist John M. Rosen while working on Snake Pit and in the 1940s and 1950s he was supervised by Rosen and worked with seriously disturbed patients. Brand was fascinated by Rosen's eccentric version of psychoanalysis, which was later criticized because of patient deaths, leading to Rosen surrendering his medical licence. Based on his experience with Rosen's methods, Brand wrote the novel Savage Sleep (1968).

Blacklisted from work in film and theater, Brand was an editor at Crown Publishers for about twenty years, starting in the early 1950s, where he edited works by Indian social-realist novelist Bhabani Bhattacharya. He also taught in the writing programs at the University of New Hampshire and New York University.

Brand described the Pennsylvania Dutch culture in Fields of Peace: A Pennsylvania German Album (1970)—with photography by George Tice—and in Local Lives (1975), a book of poems about his Pennsylvania Dutch neighbors, compiled over the span of his working life.

== Activism ==
Brand supported various anti-fascist causes, beginning in the 1930s and was later active in the peace movement. Toward the end of his life, he was active in a movement to open up major poetry publications to writers of color and younger writers, through his friendship with the Caribbean-American poet, essayist, teacher, and activist, June Jordan.

In 1953, Brand was required to appear before the U.S. Senate Investigations subcommittee, chaired by Senator Joseph McCarthy, at which appearance he refused to testify against his colleagues in the League of American Writers, citing the Fifth Amendment. Consequently, his works were among those banned from U.S. State Department libraries, abroad.

== Bibliography ==
- Brand, Millen (1937). The Outward Room. New York: Simon & Schuster. ISBN 9781590173596.
- Brand, Millen (1939). The Heroes. New York: Simon and Schuster.
- Brand, Millen (1947). Albert Sears. New York: Simon and Schuster.
- Brand, Millen (1959). Some love, some hunger. Berlin: Seven Seas Publishers.
- Brand, Millen (1968). Savage Sleep. New York: Crown Publishers.
- Brand, Millen (1970). Fields of Peace: a Pennsylvania German Album. Boston: David R. Godine Publisher. ISBN 9781567920765.
- Brand, Millen (1975). Local lives. New York: C. N. Potter. ISBN 9780517519981.
- Brand, Millen (1980). Peace march, Nagasaki to Hiroshima. Woodstock, Vermont: Countryman Press. ISBN 9780914378648. "Millen Brand Peace March: Nagasaki to Hiroshima."
