= Jabotinsky Medal =

The Jabotinsky Medal may refer to one of several awards named in honor of Vladimir Ze’ev Jabotinsky:

== Jabotinsky Order of Israel awards ==
The Jabotinsky Prize for Literature and Research is an award given by the Jabotinsky Order of Israel, founded in 1959, for outstanding achievements in the sphere of literature and research every two years.

Among the winners of the award are: Benjamin Netanyahu, Iddo Netanyahu, Chaim Lazar-Lithuanian, Yehoshua Yavin, Abba Ahimair, David Niv, Yigal Yadin, Menachem Sarid, Yaakov Orland, Uzi Narkis, Naomi Shemer, Moshe Yegar, Herzl Rosenblum, Ephraim Kishon, Yitzhak Oren, Yosef Nadava, Yaakov Ha'alyon, Uri Milstein, Esther Vitkon, Dosh, Avigdor Shahan, Yehuda Blum, Isaac Ramba, Jeremiah Halpern, Jacob Winshel and Yehiam Weitz.

The Jabotinsky Order Life Achievement Award, is awarded annually by the Jabotinsky Order of Israel to an outstanding personality in public, academic or professional life.

== Jabotinsky Foundation awards ==
The Jabotinsky Centennial Medal was awarded in 1980, the centenary of Jabotinsky's birth, by the Jabotinsky Foundation of New York to 100 Americans who had performed distinguished service to the state of Israel and the Jewish people. The award was handed out to recipients by Israeli prime minister Menachem Begin at an awards dinner held in November in New York City.

Recipients included: Rev. Billy Graham, Henry M. Jackson, Jacob Javits, Daniel Moynihan, Philip M. Klutznick, Edward Teller, Leon Uris, Eli Wiesel, Danny Kaye, Jerry Falwell, Elmo R. Zumwalt, Claude Pepper, Hart N. Hasten, Avraham Soltes, Nathan George Horwitt, Esther Antin Untermeyer, Moshe Brodetzky, Herzel Kranz, William Perl, Paul S. Riebenfeld and David Horowitz. Senator Frank Church declined the award due in protest of it also being awarded to Falwell.

In 1983, industrialist Eryk Spektor, chairman of the New York-based Jabotinsky Foundation, created and funded a $100,000 award named the Jabotinsky Prize - Shield of Jerusalem (also known as the Defender of Jerusalem Prize) to honour individuals, Jewish or non-Jewish, who are judged to have done the most in the previous two years "for the defense of the rights of the Jewish people." The $100,000 prize was shared by US Senator Henry M. Jackson (posthumously), Soviet Jewish activist Iosif Begun, and former French Cabinet Minister Simone Veil in 1983 and US Ambassador Jeane Kirkpatrick and Operation Moses in 1985. In 1986 former President of Costa Rica Luis Alberto Monge, former Swedish deputy prime minister Per Ahlmark, and Soviet dissident Eliyahu Essas shared the award. Israeli philosopher and former Lehi activist Israel Eldad was awarded the prize for 1987/1988. Other recipients have included former Soviet dissident Ida Nudel, industrialist Reuben Hecht, the LIBI Fund charity assisting Israeli soldiers, Israeli prime minister Yitzhak Shamir, New York Times editor A.M. Rosenthal, conductor Zubin Mehta, US secretary of state George Shultz, and civil rights activist Bayard Rustin.
