= Paul S. Riebenfeld =

American political scientist (1911–2001)

Paul S. Riebenfeld (16 September 1911 – 18 March 2001) was a German-American political scientist, international jurist and lawyer. He served as a Zionist delegate to the Palestine Mandate Commission of the League of Nations from 1937 to 1939; as Honorary Chairman of the "Louis D. Brandeis Society of Zionist Lawyers"; and as Chairman of the "Policy Committee of Jordan-is-Palestine (International)." He was a recipient of the Jabotinsky Medal. He was born in Schöneberg, Berlin, and became an American citizen in 1958.

For years he argued, on legal grounds, and under international law, for the legality of Jewish settlement in "Judea," "Samaria," and the "Gaza District" — meaning thereby, the West Bank and the Gaza Strip. Contrary to this position, he could not unobjectionably be termed a "right winger"; for example, he expressed the view that Palestinians were legitimate Israelis, because they were, arguably, merely Jews and Hebrews of Muslim religion or faith. If let alone, and peace came, the two peoples would re-unite, over time, by inter-marriage.
