= Stefan Kanfer =

American journalist, critic, editor and author (1933–2018)

- Born: May 17, 1933; New York City
- Died: June 19, 2018 (aged 85); Sleepy Hollow, New York
- Education: New York University
- Occupations: Journalist, contributing editor, critic, author
- Spouse: Dorothy May Markey Kanfer
- Relatives: Myra Page (mother-in-law)
- Writing career
- Language: Yiddish, English
- Period: 1960s–2000s
- Genre: Arts

Stefan Kanfer (May 17, 1933 – June 19, 2018) was an American journalist, critic, editor, and author.

== Background ==
Stefan Kanfer was born on May 17, 1933, in New York City and raised there and in Hastings-on-Hudson. His family were Jews from Romania, and he spoke Yiddish. His father was a schoolteacher during the Great Depression during Kanfer's early childhood. He attended New York University.

== Career ==
In the early 1950s, Kanfer served in an army intelligence unit during the Korean War.

Experience included: "bohemian" in Paris, advertising, military interrogator, writer of cartoon captions, and TV gag-writer.

In the early 1960s, he became a film critic, book critic, and senior editor at Time magazine for more than 20 years when Henry Grunwald ran the magazine. (When Grunwald retired, Kanfer spoke at his retirement party.) Colleagues there included Lance Morrow. He left Time staff in 1987 and contributed articles for another five years.

After Time, he became drama critic for The New Leader, and then contributing editor or writer on arts, culture, and politics for the City Journal (under managing editor Myron Magnet), The Wall Street Journal, and other publications.

== Personal life and death ==
Kanfer was married to Dorothy May Markey Kanfer ("May"), daughter of John Markey and Dorothy Markey (pen name Myra Page).

His circle of friends included: Henry Grunwald, fellow Romanian Jew Elie Wiesel, Lance Morrow, Roger Rosenblatt, John Leo, Paul Gray, Ron Sheppard, Jess Korman, Chris Porterfield, Michael Walsh, B. J. Phillips, and Gerald Clarke. (With Morrow, Kanfer formed the "Chester A. Arthur Chapter of the Chuck Jones Fan Club of America.")

With Wiesel, he served on the presidential Wiesel Commission on the Romanian holocaust.

He served as mentor and supporter of younger writers, played the ukulele and musical saw, and held concerts and film presentations in his home.

Kanfer died on June 19, 2018, age 85, in Sleepy Hollow, New York.

== Awards ==
- New York Public Library Literary Lions honoree
- Academy Award-nominated documentary

== Works ==
Kanfer published 16 books and numerous articles, numerous songs, plays, essays, and reviews.
