= Leumit Health Care Services =

Israeli health maintenance organization

Leumit
- Leumit Health Services
- לאומית שירותי בריאות
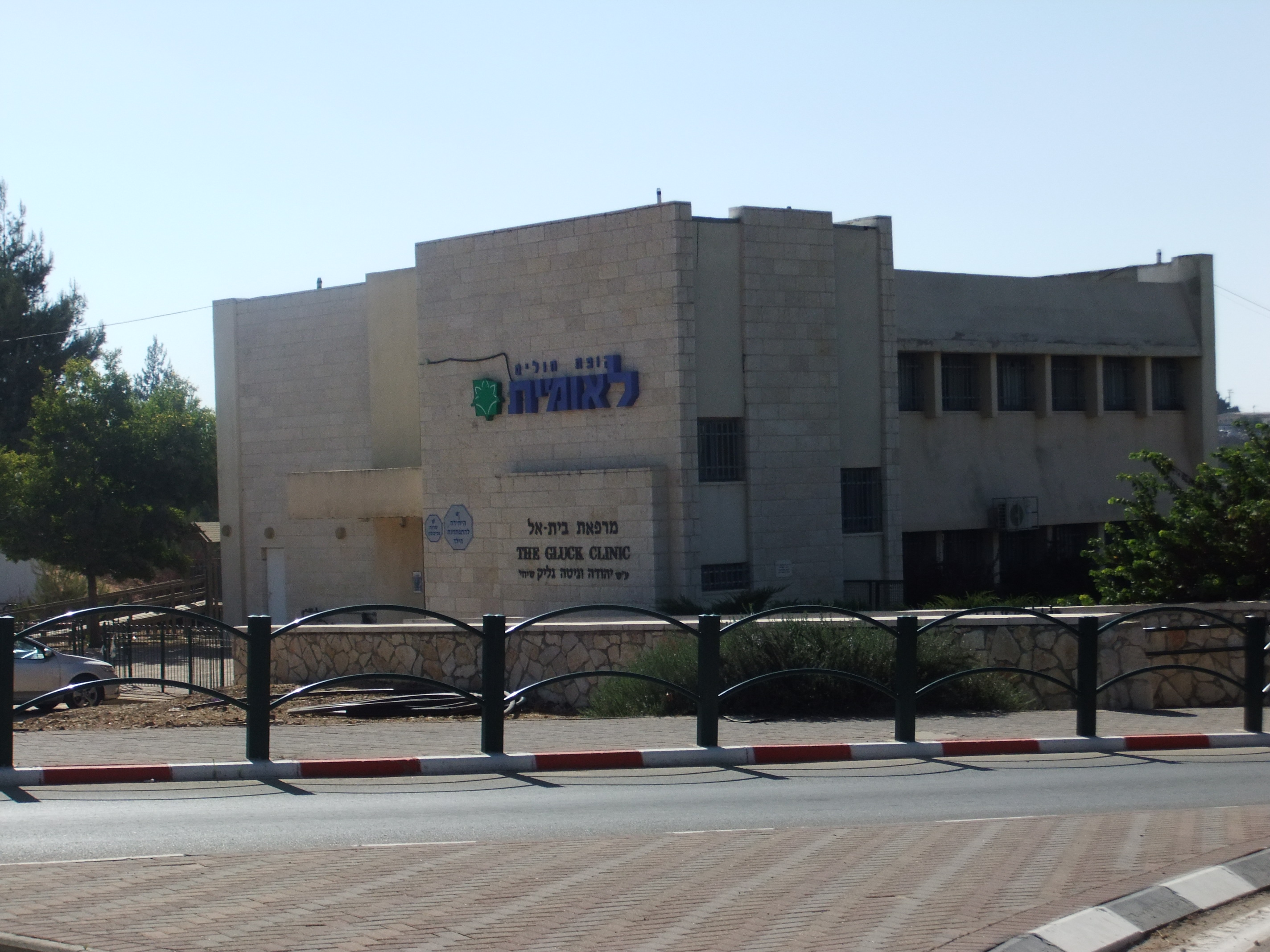
- Leumit clinic in Beit El
- Founded: 1933; 93 years ago
- Headquarters: Tel Aviv, Israel
- Members: 712,000 (2020)
- Key people: Yaakov Adri, Chairman, Haim Fernandes, CEO
- Website: www.leumit.co.il/eng/home

Leumit Health Services (Hebrew: לאומית שירותי בריאות, Leumit Sherutey Bri'ut, lit. National Health Care Services, formerly Kupat Holim Leumit, lit. National Sickness Fund) is an Israeli health insurance and medical services organization, founded in 1933 by the Revisionist Zionist Movement. As of 2024 it was the smallest of the four Kupot Holim (Israel's state-mandated health funds), with approximately 724,000 members representing 7.57% of the population.

== Research Institute ==
The Leumit research institute was established in 2019 to promote innovative medical solutions, foster research collaborations, assist in the academic advancement of researchers, and attract professionals to improve the quality and quantity of medical care in the community.

Notable publications from the Leumit research institute include a study showing glycated hemoglobin levels markedly underestimated glucose levels in patients with G6PD deficiency, published in The New England Journal of Medicine, and a systematic screening study which identified novel medication and disease factors associated with the risk of developing schizophrenia.

Leumit Start is the innovation and digital health unit of Leumit Health Services.

== History ==
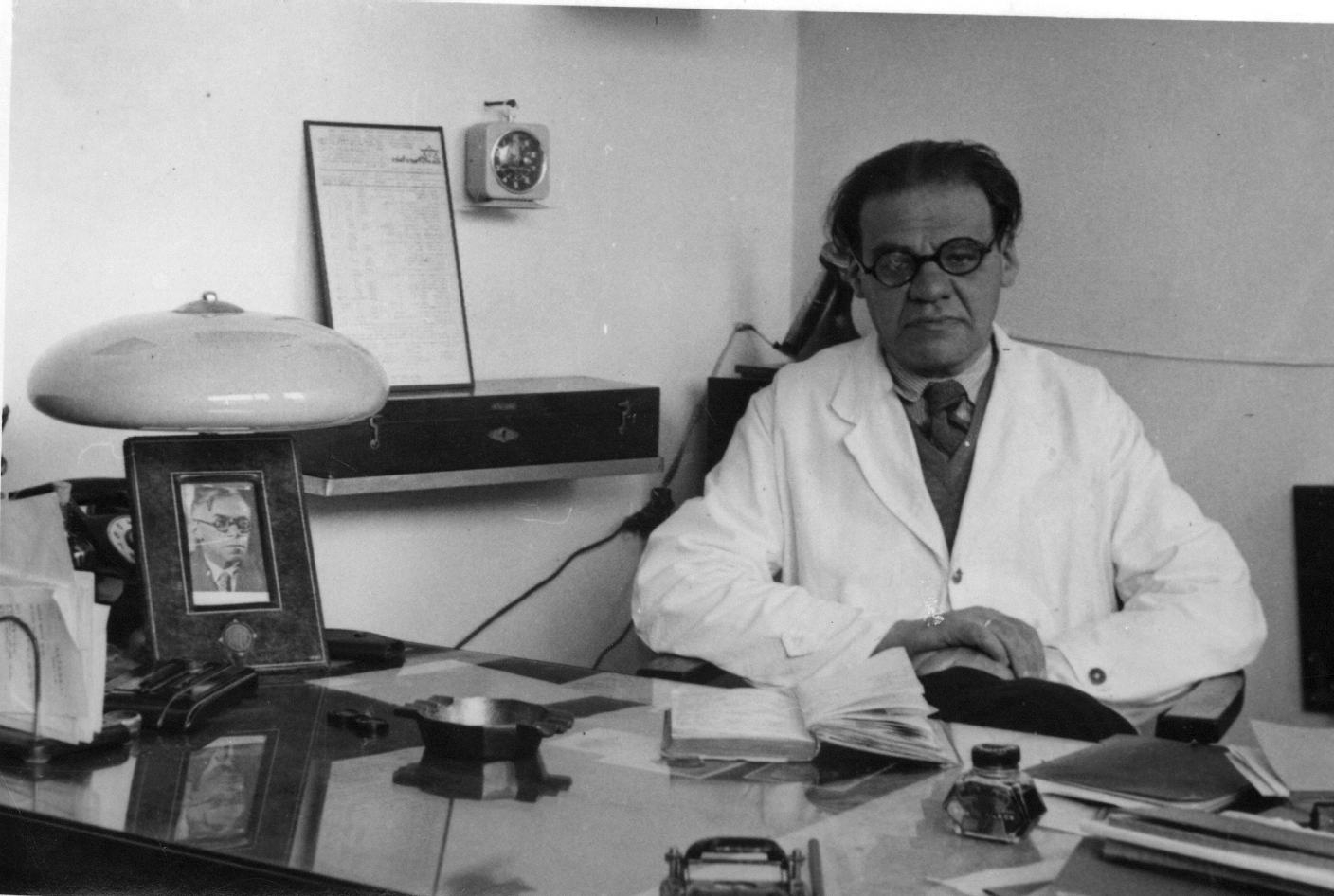
Dr. Yosef Pa'amoni, one of the founders of Kupat Holim Leumit

Kupat Holim Leumit was established in 1933 by physicians who had been dismissed from their work in the General Health Fund (Clalit) following Arlosoroff's murder. Dr. Jacob Weinshal opened the first clinic at his home in Tel Aviv.

The uniqueness of the Leumit Health Fund lay in offering members the right to select the physician and medical service of their choice.

The fund's first manager, Mr. Melamedowitz, declared that the fund would be open to everyone and patients would be treated as acquaintances, not numbers.

Today Leumit Leumit operates more than 320 medical centers and 150 pharmacies nationwide.

== See also ==
- Health care in Israel
