= Mary Jane Ward =

American writer

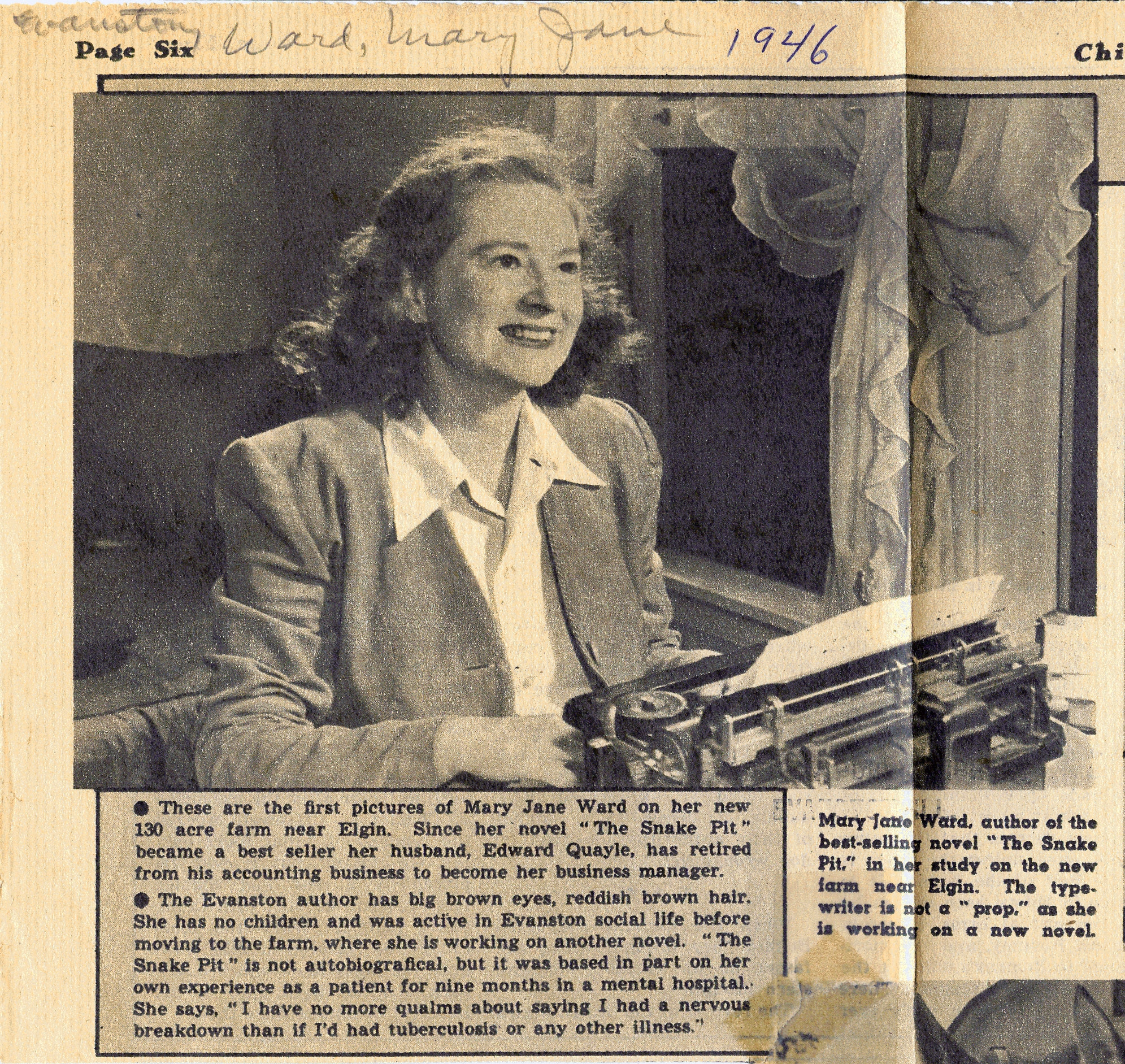
- Mary Jane Ward at her typewriter
- Born: August 27, 1905; Fairmount, Indiana
- Died: February 17, 1981 (aged 75); Tucson, Arizona
- Occupation: Novelist
- Notable work: The Snake Pit

Mary Jane Ward (August 27, 1905 in Fairmount, Indiana—February 17, 1981, in Tucson, Arizona) was an American novelist whose semi-autobiographical book The Snake Pit was made into an Oscar-winning film.

== Works ==
Ward authored eight books during her lifetime, the most noted being The Snake Pit, which received widespread critical acclaim after its publication in 1946. Ward's semi-autobiographical story about a woman's recovery from mental illness made more than a hundred thousand dollars in its first month; it was quickly chosen for Random House's book-of-the-month club, was condensed by Reader's Digest, and developed into an Oscar-winning film The Snake Pit, starring Olivia de Havilland. Ward's story, told in the novel and the ensuing film, has been credited with helping change public opinion on the condition of state psychiatric hospitals and the need for legislation to improve conditions for the mentally ill.

== Biography ==
Mary Jane Ward was born August 27, 1905, in Fairmount, Indiana. Ward—a double cousin of author Ross Lockridge Jr.—maintained an interest in writing and music from an early age; as a teenager, she composed her own music, but would eventually choose writing as her main focus. After graduating from high school, Ward studied at Northwestern University and at Chicago's Lyceum of Arts Conservatory, and went on to work at a series of odd jobs. In March 1928, she married Edward Quayle, a statistician and amateur playwright, and became inspired to submit her own writing for publication. Ward published a few short stories, and in 1937 she received a job as a book reviewer for the Evanston News-Index. That same year, E. P. Dutton published Ward's novel The Tree Has Roots. A second novel, The Wax Apple, was published in 1938. Both books received decent reviews but did not achieve much popularity.

Ward and Quayle moved to Greenwich Village in 1939. Neither of them was very successful in publishing their material, and the financial stress contributed to her psychological distress. According to a case study published by her therapist in 1943, Ward suffered from catatonic schizophrenia. The general causes were her worries about the upcoming war, her abilities as a writer and the financial problems of her and her husband. The immediate cause was a political speech she was scheduled to make, advocating pacifist opposition to the war. Anxious and sleepless, she decided she had tuberculosis, then became agitated, hiding in her kitchen and "asked her husband to knock her down." First at Bellevue Hospital and then Rockland State Hospital, she was mute, incontinent, and alternated between catatonic stupor and aggression. Over the next few years, drawing from her experiences at the psychiatric institution, Ward penned the novel The Snake Pit. The book was published in 1946 and received glowing reviews from critics and from experts in the psychiatric field.

One surprising feature of the book today may be the advanced political consciousness of Virginia. As in the movie Snake Pit, there are frequent jokes over the economic insecurities of the day, the plight of women in a depressed economy, and the need for solidarity among the downtrodden. The book takes Virginia further, however, making her an opponent of racial prejudice and institutional segregation. On one of the back wards, for example, she encounters an authoritarian nurse who will not allow anyone to walk on the ward rug —a scene repeated in the film. In the book, the nurse is both authoritarian and a racist, who will not let a Black patient wear a hat that Virginia has offered her. This antiracist message reflected the views of Mary Jane Ward and her husband, who were involved with the Council for Democratic Action in Evanston in the 1930s.

At the time The Snake Pit was published, Ward denied that the story reflected in any way on her own life, but it was later revealed that the book had been formed around her experiences at Rockland. After her admission to Rockland, an experimental psychiatric institution, Ward was released eight and one-half months later on February 22, 1942. The kindly character "Dr. Kik" was based on Gerard Chrzanowski, who treated Ward at Rockland and had studied with Frieda Fromm-Reichmann. Dr. Militades Zaphiropoulos, who also worked at Rockland while Ward was being treated there, stated in an interview that Chrzanowski was nicknamed "Dr. Kik" because Americans tended to have difficulty pronouncing his name. In contrast with the motion picture, the novel Snake Pit shows Virginia to disagree with Dr. Kik's Freudian interpretations of her illness. Expressed in Ward's typical irreverent style, Virginia says "I do not like thee, Dr. Kik—now that I am not so sick". Ward employed literary devices to narrate a depersonalizing means of survival, an example being referring to a male staff in the institution first as "the young sailer," and later as "the young jailer," during her incidents of involuntary hydrotherapy and tube feeding.

After the success of The Snake Pit, Ward and Quayle moved to a dairy farm outside of Chicago, where Ward continued to write. She went on to publish The Professor's Umbrella (1948), A Little Night Music (1951), It's Different for a Woman (1952), Counterclockwise (1969), and The Other Caroline (1970). Editing the last of these books for her publisher was accomplished by Millen Brand, one of the screenwriters for the film Snake Pit who had become a friend.

Ward was hospitalized for psychiatric issues three more times during her lifetime, and her last two novels revisit the theme of psychiatric illness. She died on February 17, 1981, in Tucson, Arizona, at the age of 75.
