= Bryna Ivens Untermeyer =

American writer

Bryna Ivens Untermeyer (August 27, 1909 - March 1985) was an American writer and editor. She was an editor for She and Seventeen, from which she also edited story collections. She also edited collections of children stories with her husband poet Louis Untermeyer and wrote a book about one of their cats from its perspective, Memoir for Mrs. Sullavan.

Untermeyer was fiction and feature editor at Seventeen until 1948.

She is credited as a writer for the 1941 film Murder on Lenox Avenue. Untermeyer wrote Memoir for Mrs. Sullivan about her family's cat. She edited Sorry Dear, an illustrated collection of sayings from famous authors.

== Personal life ==
Bryna Ivens married poet Louis Untermeyer in 1948, though the legal status of the marriage was contested. Untermeyer was 62 while Ivens was 39. They edited collections of classic children's tales together. Jan Struther inscribed a poem about a cat to the couple.

== Selected works ==
- Memoir for Mrs. Sullavan illustrated by Barry Gelle
- The Seventeen Reader edited by Bryna Ivens. Lippincott
- Legendary Animals (1954), a collection of tales featuring animals
- Stories first published in the magazine Seventeen with a wide range of theme and mood, all featuring teenagers; Fun and fancy (1958)
- Old friends and lasting favorites (1962)
- Wonder Lands (1962), a collection of folk tales
- The golden treasury of children's literature (1966), a collection of classic fairy tales
- Sorry Dear, editor, by Bryna Ivens Untermeyer. Golden Press, New York (1968)
- The Love Poems of Robert Herrick and John Donne, edited with her husband
