= The Snake Pit =

1948 film by Anatole Litvak

- Theatrical release poster
- Directed by: Anatole Litvak
- Screenplay by: Frank Partos; Millen Brand; Arthur Laurents (uncredited)
- Based on: The Snake Pit by Mary Jane Ward
- Produced by: Robert Bassler; Anatole Litvak; Darryl F. Zanuck
- Starring: Olivia de Havilland; Mark Stevens; Leo Genn; Celeste Holm
- Cinematography: Leo Tover
- Edited by: Dorothy Spencer
- Music by: Alfred Newman
- Production company: 20th Century-Fox
- Distributed by: 20th Century-Fox
- Release date: November 13, 1948
- Running time: 108 minutes
- Country: United States
- Language: English
- Budget: $3.8 million
- Box office: $10 million

The Snake Pit is a 1948 American psychological drama film directed by Anatole Litvak and starring Olivia de Havilland, Mark Stevens, Leo Genn, Celeste Holm, Beulah Bondi, and Lee Patrick. Based on Mary Jane Ward's 1946 semi-autobiographical novel of the same name, the film recounts the tale of a woman who finds herself in an insane asylum and cannot remember how she got there.

The novel was adapted for the screen by Frank Partos and Millen Brand, in screen credits order, and Arthur Laurents (uncredited).

== Plot ==
Virginia Cunningham is an apparently schizophrenic patient at a mental hospital called the Juniper Hill State Hospital. She hears voices and seems so out of touch with reality that she does not recognize her husband Robert.

Dr. Kik works with her, and flashbacks show how Virginia and Robert met a few years earlier in Chicago. He worked for a publisher who rejected her writing, and they bumped into each other again in the cafeteria. Occasionally she continued to drop by the cafeteria so they got to know each other.

Despite their blossoming romance, Virginia abruptly leaves town without explanation. Robert moves to New York and bumps into her again at the Philharmonic. After she provides a flimsy excuse for her absence and departure, they pick up where they left off, though she remains evasive and avoids his desire for marriage. Eventually, Virginia brings up the possibility of marriage. They marry on May 7, but Virginia acts erratically again. She cannot sleep and loses touch with reality, as she feels it is November and snaps when Robert corrects her. The rest of the film follows her therapy. Dr. Kik puts her through electro-shock treatment and narcosynthesis. Dr. Kik wants to get to the "causes of her unconscious rejection." The film includes many flashbacks, including her earlier failed engagement to Gordon as well as childhood issues. The film shows her progress and what happens to her along the way.

The mental hospital is organized on a system of wards, with the best functioning patients assigned to the wards with the lowest numbers, which have better furnishings and more relaxed rules for patient behavior. Virginia moves to the lowest level (One), where she is treated well by a young nurse but is picked on by Nurse Davis, the only truly abusive nurse in the hospital. Davis is jealous of Dr. Kik's interest in Virginia, which she sees as excessive. Nurse Davis goads Virginia into an outburst which results in Virginia being straitjacketed and expelled from Level One into the "snake pit", where patients considered beyond help are simply placed together in a large padded cell and abandoned. Dr. Kik, learning of this, has Virginia returned to Level One, but away from Nurse Davis's care.

Despite this setback, Dr. Kik's care continues to improve Virginia's mental state. Over time, Virginia gains insight and self-understanding, and is able to leave the hospital.

The film depicts the bureaucratic regimentation of the institution, the staff (some unkind and aloof, some kind and empathetic), and relationships between patients, from which Virginia learns as much as she does in therapy.

== Cast ==
Actor/Actress	Character
Olivia de Havilland	Virginia Stuart Cunningham
Mark Stevens	Robert Cunningham
Leo Genn	Dr. Mark H. Van Kensdelaerik / "Dr. Kik"
Celeste Holm	Grace
Glenn Langan	Dr. Terry
Helen Craig	Nurse Davis
Leif Erickson	Gordon
Beulah Bondi	Mrs. Greer
Lee Patrick	Asylum Inmate
Howard Freeman	Dr. Curtis
Natalie Schafer	Mrs. Stuart
Ruth Donnelly	Ruth
Katherine Locke	Margaret
Celia Lovsky	Gertrude
Frank Conroy	Dr. Jonathan Gifford
Minna Gombell	Miss Hart
Betsy Blair	Hester
Lora Lee Michel	Virginia at age 6
Eula Morgan	Attendant

== Production ==
Gene Tierney was the first choice to play the role of Virginia, but was replaced by de Havilland when Tierney became pregnant.

When the book The Snake Pit was still in galleys, the president of Random House, Bennett Cerf, showed it to his friend Anatole Litvak, who bought the rights. Litvak was born in Kiev to Lithuanian Jewish parents and learned filmmaking in Leningrad. He began his career as a director with films in Berlin, Paris, and London. Moving to the United States, Litvak became known as the most prominent director of films with antifascist sentiment. Most notably, he directed Confessions of a Nazi Spy in 1939, alerting American audiences to the rise of Hitler. When the United States entered the war, Litvak enlisted in the U.S. Army and co-directed with Frank Capra the Why We Fight films, which Capra produced. In his contact with men who had survived combat, Litvak became interested in the psychiatric treatment of veterans and the plight of the mentally ill. After buying the rights to The Snake Pit, Litvak sold them to Darryl F. Zanuck at Twentieth Century-Fox. Zanuck had produced films with social conscience, most notably The Grapes of Wrath and Gentleman's Agreement. With The Snake Pit, Zanuck added mental patients to Jews and the poor as groups left out of the American dream.

Director Litvak insisted upon three months of grueling research. He demanded that the entire cast and crew accompany him to various mental institutions and to lectures by leading psychiatrists. He did not have to convince de Havilland, who threw herself into the research with an intensity that surprised even those who knew her well. Her interest derived in part from having had a childhood friend who was hospitalized with schizophrenia. De Havilland watched carefully each of the procedures then in vogue, including hydrotherapy and electric shock treatments. When permitted, she sat in on long individual therapy sessions. She attended social functions, including dinners and dances with the patients. In fact, after the film's release, when columnist Florabel Muir questioned in print whether any mental institution actually "allowed contact dances among violent inmates," Muir was surprised by a telephone call from de Havilland, who assured her she had attended several such dances herself. Much of the film was filmed in the Camarillo State Mental Hospital in California.

Litvak was an early adopter and master of the whip pan scene transition device, and used it no fewer than eight times in this film.

== Reception ==
On Rotten Tomatoes, the film holds an approval rating of 100% based on ten reviews, with a weighted average rating of 8.1/10.

=== Critical reception ===
The critics were generally positive, with Louella Parsons declaring: "It is the most courageous subject ever attempted on the screen". Walter Winchell wrote: "Its seething quality gets inside of you."

Variety wrote: "The Snake Pit is a standout among class melodramas. Based on Mary Jane Ward's novel, picture probes into the processes of mental illness with a razor-sharp forthrightness, giving an open-handed display of the make-up of bodies without minds and the treatments used to restore intelligence. Clinical detail is stated with matter-of-fact clarity and becomes an important part of the melodramatics."

The Hollywood Reporter wrote: "All the vivid performances of The Snake Pit are not in the upper division of the cast. There are outstanding moments by Beulah Bondi, an elderly lady who imagines herself wealthy; Ruth Donnelly, another inmate; Betsy Blair, a girl who never speaks; and Howard Freeman, playing a doctor whose thoughtless ways harass the unhappy victims.

Author and film critic Leonard Maltin awarded the film three and a half out of a possible four stars, calling it "gripping" and "one of the first films to deal intelligently with mental breakdown and the painstakingly slow recovery process".

Among liberals and leftists the film was received as politically progressive. Thus, the Communist Party USA's People's Daily World hailed it as "A Film Achievement" and explained that it "does not foster an argument that the solution to our problems lies in new regiments of psychoanalysts".

A contemporaneous account by Millen Brand, who co-wrote the screenplay, said that leading psychiatrists found the film "sensational". Writing about a special showing arranged for sixty psychiatrists in New York City, Brand told a fellow screenwriter that "the psychiatrists not only were enthusiastic without reserve, but they were swooning around at the lengths to which we had gone to show the real complexity and scope of analytic treatment". Mary Jane Ward, on whose book the film was based, also expressed support for the screenplay and the film, as did journalist Albert Deutsch.

The film has come under fire from some feminist authors for a seeming misportrayal of Virginia's difficulties and the implication that accepting a subservient role as a wife and mother is part of her "cure". Other film analysts view it as successful in conveying Ward's view of the uncertainties of post-World War II life and women's roles.

=== Censorship ===
Due to public concerns that the extras in the film were in fact real mental patients being exploited, the British censor added a foreword explaining that everyone who appeared on screen was a paid actor and that conditions in British hospitals were unlike those portrayed in the film. The censor also cut 1,000 feet of the film, deleting all sequences involving patients in straitjackets, and lighter scenes evoking laughter. A group of psychiatric nurses in Britain tried to have the film banned but failed. To counteract the idea that U.K. hospitals were as dismal as those in the U.S., the Crown Film Unit produced Out of True, a motion picture showing the positive atmosphere and methods in the U.K.

== Awards ==
The Snake Pit won the Academy Award for Best Sound Recording (Thomas T. Moulton), and was nominated for Best Actress in a Leading Role (de Havilland), Best Director, Best Music, Scoring of a Dramatic or Comedy Picture, Best Picture and Best Writing, Screenplay.

The film also won the International Prize at the Venice Film Festival in 1949, where it was cited for "a daring inquiry in a clinical case dramatically performed."

== Impact ==
The film led to changes in the conditions of mental institutions in the United States. In 1949, Herb Stein of Daily Variety wrote "Wisconsin is the seventh state to institute reforms in its mental hospitals as a result of The Snake Pit."

Publicity releases from Twentieth Century-Fox claimed that twenty-six of the then forty-eight states had enacted reform legislation because of the movie. While it is wise to be cautious about claims that a film changed social policy, recent scholarship suggests that such an assertion may be valid. One reformer connected to The Snake Pit who does not appear in histories of psychiatry was Charles Schlaifler, a key figure in getting federal support for mental health after World War II. In 1942, Schlaifler became a vice president for advertising at the Fox studio, and was put in charge of public relations for The Snake Pit. In that role, his consciousness about the mentally ill was raised, and soon Schlaifler began testifying before Congress on the need for more funds for the National Institute of Mental Health. Then, in 1951, he became a spokesman for the National Mental Health Committee, founded by Mary Lasker. In the transcripts of Congressional hearings in the 1950s, one sees how effective Schlaifler was with congressmen and the business executives whom he brought to testify that research on mental health problems would be good for business. While Schlaifler had no interest in creating a social movement, he played a key role in making mental illness a national concern, not just the business of individual states. More concretely, he helped convince members of Congress to dramatically increase funds to combat mental illness, and was treated as an authority because of his work on The Snake Pit. Thus, that film influenced the public's attitudes directly and had an effect upon elites who controlled budgets related to the mentally ill.

== Home media ==
The film was first released on home video in the United States on December 1, 1993.

== Other adaptations ==
The Snake Pit was dramatized as an hour-long radio play on the April 10, 1950, broadcast of Lux Radio Theatre, with de Havilland reprising her film role.

== See also ==
- Mental illness in films
