= Ya'akov Winschel =

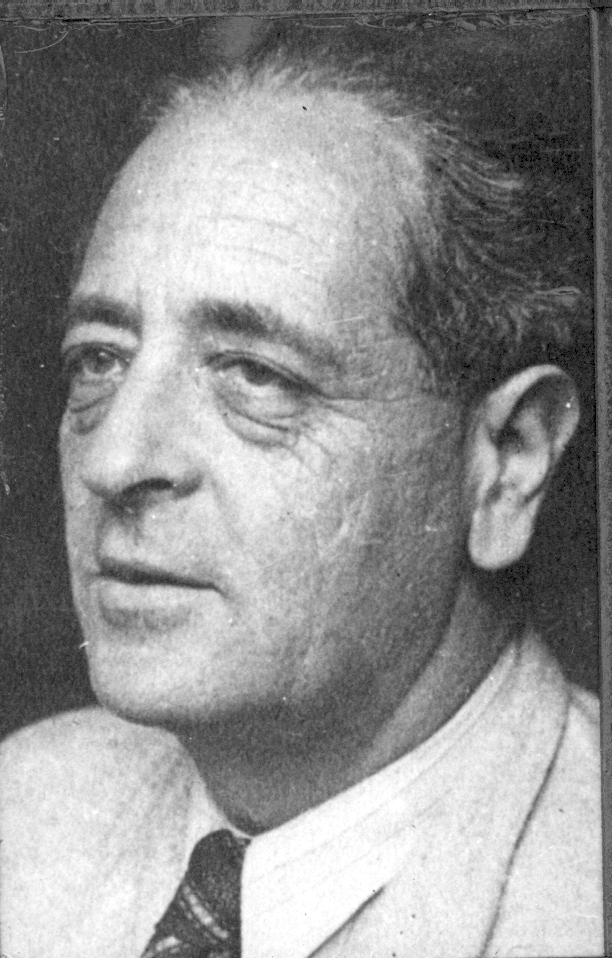
Ya'akov Winschel, 1956

Ya'akov Winschel (Hebrew: יעקב וינשל), sometimes written as Weinschel (ויינשל) (1891–1981) was an Israeli doctor, book writer and essayist, and Revisionist Zionist politician.

Ya'akov Winschel was born in Tiflis, then in Georgia, Russian Empire, now Tbilisi, to the family of Ze'ev Winschel, a physician. Late his family moved to Baku. He studied medicine in Munich, Geneva and Dorpat (modern-day Tartu, Estonia) and was active in youth Zionist organizations, in particular, in editing their newspapers.

He was a founder of Leumit Health Care Services.

In 1968, he was a recipient of the Jabotinsky Prize for Literature.
