= Esther Antin Untermeyer =

American judge (died 1983)

Esther (or Ester) Antin Untermeyer (died January 1983) was the first woman to be a judge in Lucas County, Ohio in 1925 when she took the position of Toledo Municipal Court judge. Israeli Prime Minister Menachem Begin awarded Untermeyer the Jabotinsky Medal in 1980 for distinguished service to Israel and the Jewish people.

== Family life ==
Esther Antin married poet Louis Untermeyer in 1933 after they met in Toledo at a lecture. The couple resided at Stony Water, a working farm. Louis became unhappy with the marriage and obtained a Mexican divorce in 1948.

== Legal career ==
Untermeyer was the first woman to be a judge in Lucas County, Ohio in 1925 when she took the position of Toledo Municipal Court judge. Untermeyer left the position of judge in 1933.

== Advocacy ==
Untermeyer was a founder of the American League for Free Palestine and served as the organization's treasurer during the 1940s. And was on the executive board of the Herut Zionists of America.

== Recognition ==
Israeli Prime Minister Menachem Begin awarded Untermeyer the Jabotinsky Medal in 1980 for distinguished service to Israel and the Jewish people.

== Death ==
Untermeyer died in January 1983 in Manhattan, New York.
