= Pauline Leader =

Deaf American writer

- Leader as a young woman, painted by Henry Lavarack
- Born: October 16, 1908; New York City
- Died: July 13, 2001 (aged 92); Portland, Oregon
- Occupation: Writer
- Years active: 1927-1946
- Known for: Social commentary, poetry
- Notable work: And No Birds Sing

Pauline Leader (October 16, 1908–July 13, 2001) was a writer and poet, noted for her memoir, And No Birds Sing, which chronicles her growing up in Bennington, Vermont as an outcast daughter of Jewish immigrants and her bohemian life in Greenwich Village, subsequent to becoming deaf at age 12. Her work pioneered understanding the perspective of people with disabilities and represented a step towards recognizing the need to accommodate them in society.

== Early life ==
Leader was born in New York City on October 16, 1908, to Isaac and Frieda, Jewish immigrants from Eastern Europe. The family moved to Bennington, Vermont, where her mother ran a boarding house and a butcher shop. Her father became the rabbi of Bennington's first synagogue. Her mother died at age 39. Her father beat her frequently. She had four younger siblings.

She became deaf in 1921, as a result of meningitis, which added to her sense of being an outcast in her town as she adapted to her new condition by attempting to pass unnoticed. Deafness led to her eviction from a school that could not accommodate her disability. Her mother declined to send her to a boarding school for deaf people. Nonetheless, she became an avid reader and found an avenue for self-expression in writing. She worked in local factories to acquire funds to leave town. Her estrangement from family and community induced her to run away to New York City at age 17.

== Greenwich Village ==
Upon her arrival in Manhattan, Leader stayed in a series of modest rooming houses in Greenwich Village, while looking for work—difficult for a deaf person to find. She typically found work in sweatshops and was often fired, owing to misunderstandings arising out of her deafness. The conditions that she experienced informed much of her writing about such workplaces.

Dustcover of 1931 edition of And No Birds Sing

She sometimes ate at automats in order to minimize having to interact with waiters as a deaf person, sometimes partaking of leftover scraps. One eatery, Hubert's Cafeteria in Sheridan Square, gave her an entry point into the world of writers, artists, and other unconventional people who spent time there. Among those whom she befriended were writers Maxwell Bodenheim, Tom Boggs, and Joe Gould. Initially, she was an observer on the sidelines, typically for one hour after midnight and filled notebooks with observations not just about the bohemian crowd, but also of the working-class people who frequented the eatery. During this period, she attempted to promote poets and their poetry through readings, contests and a venue for posting poetry. Fearing that she was pregnant, she reported to a clinic, which led to her detention as a "wayward" woman, only to be released when her period arrived. This experience added to the societal trauma that she observed and took notes on in Greenwich Village.

By the turn of the 1930s, some of Leader's poems appeared in print. In this period, she entered into a relationship with Henry Lavarack, who—estranged from his wife—had joined the art scene in the Village. They lived for a period in Woodstock, New York, which led to Leader giving birth to their daughter. This period marked the completion of her memoir in 1931, And No Birds Sing, which Vanguard, the publisher, nominated for a Pulitzer Prize, as it received positive reviews. A 2016 reprint added a biography in the foreword and an essay on the work's significance in the afterword. Routledge published a London edition in 1932. The book featured a portrait of Leader by Lavarack on its dustcover. The work, which chronicled her experiences amidst the working class and with the bohemians in the Village, attracted the attention of the nascent author, Millen Brand.

== Millen Brand ==
In 1932, Leader married Brand, who adopted her daughter with Lavarack's apparent blessing. They moved to Bloomfield, New Jersey after Brand began work as a copy editor for the New York Telephone Company to support the family. Prior to the move, Leader introduced Brand to a social circle of authors and scholars; they were next-door neighbors to artist, Alice Neel. After the move, their roles reversed, she maintaining the household, he participating in the arts scene. In 1933, their son, Jonathan, was born. By 1934, they returned to the city, where Brand interacted with Augusta Savage, whom the couple protected from the dissipated behavior of Joe Gould.

Leader with notes and typewriter. Photo by son, Jonathan Brand.

Two more children ensued, a daughter who died in infancy (1935) and a son, Daniel (1937). She wrote a novel, The Natives, which was never published and whose manuscript she destroyed. During this period, Brand published a successful novel, The Outward Room, based on the experiences of friends who had been institutionalized, but with substantial borrowings from And No Birds Sing. Brand's book was one of redemption of the main character, in contrast to Leader's portrayal of a life of stigma. With Leader's life in the shadow of Brand's, the marriage began to falter in April, 1939, when the family moved to New Hope, Pennsylvania. Leader became a regular contributor to Franklin P. Adams' literary column, "The Conning Tower", in the New York Post. By September, 1939, the couple separated and Leader moved with the children back to New York City, where she wrote two more novels, Roses Grow Deep and A Song for My Land, that were praised for their quality of writing but were deemed unpublishable because of their pessimistic tone—these, she destroyed. In 1942, she moved her family back to Bennington.

== Post war ==
Leader made one more go of living in Manhattan, relying on a minimal alimony from Brand and clerical job income to support a cold-water flat lifestyle with her children, whom Brand increasingly ignored. She circulated an unpublished play with veiled references to Brand among some Broadway producers, but received no interest. She then returned to Bennington where she worked in a textile mill. Taking a year off from factory work, she wrote A Room for the Night, a compendium of sketches about life in her mother's boarding house. This was published by Vanguard in 1946 with illustrations by Garth Williams. She then worked in a shoe factory to help put her son, Daniel, through MIT. Leader died at age 92 on July 13, 2001 in Portland, Oregon, where her son Jonathan lived.

== Legacy ==
In the afterword to the 2016 reprint of And No Birds Sing, Rebecca Sanchez writes about how Leader's deafness affected her rendering written words without the dimension of sound. She observes that Leader saw deafness and nonconformity as a key to opening a window to an interior world of a "gnome" that ruled her condition of deafness and became a vital part of her. According to Sanchez, Leader's writing was a step towards understanding deaf and disabled people and it represented progress beyond the ideologies of 18th and 19th-century medicine, which applied individualized correction of deviations from societal norms to the disabled. Leader's work pioneered viewing people with disabilities as a minority population, whose civil rights should be protected.

== Bibliography ==
- Leader, Pauline (February 15, 1930), "The Girl Who Looked Too Much at the Clock", Survey, pp. 578–79
- Leader, Pauline (May 1930), "Poem to Emily Dickinson", Poetry, vol. 36, p. 85
- Leader, Pauline (April 1930), "New York is a City of Trucks", This Quarter, Edward W. Titus
- Leader, Pauline (July 1931), "Aunt Mary Louise's Lover", This Quarter, vol. IV, no. 1, Edward W. Titus, pp. 88–96
- Leader, Pauline (August 15, 1931), "Overalls", Survey, pp. 470–471
- Leader, Pauline (September 1, 1931), "No Laughter Allowed", Survey, pp. 514–515
- Leader, Pauline (1931). And No Birds Sing. New York: Vanguard.
- Leader, Pauline (1932). And No Birds Sing. London: Routledge.
- Leader, Pauline (1931), "The Mystic Sense", in Porter, Edna (ed.), Double Blossoms: Helen Keller Anthology, New York: Lewis Copeland Company, p. 37
- Leader, Pauline (November 21, 1939), "You Can Keep Your Baby", NM, p. 17
- Leader, Pauline (1946). A Room for the Night. New York: Vanguard.
- Leader, Pauline; Mills, Mara; Sanchez, Rebecca (2016). And No Birds Sing. Washington, DC: Gallaudet University Press. ISBN 978-1-56368-668-9.
