= Franklin Folsom =

American writer

Franklin Brewster Folsom
- Born: July 21, 1907; Boulder, Colorado
- Died: April 30, 1995 (aged 87)
- Education: University of Colorado Boulder, University of Oxford
- Occupation: Writer
- Spouse: Mary Elting (m. 1936–1995)
- Children: Two
- Writing career
- Pen name: Benjamin Brewster; Chase Elwell; Michael Gorham; Lyman Hopkins; Horatio D. Jones; Troy Nesbit; Philip Stander
- Years active: 1955–1994

Franklin Brewster Folsom (21 July 1907 – 30 April 1995) was an American writer of popular books, many for children and young people, on archaeology, anthropology, and other subjects – he had over 80 titles published both under his own name and various pseudonyms – and a pro-Soviet political activist.

== Biography ==
Folsom graduated from the University of Colorado Boulder in 1928, and taught at Swarthmore College for two years before matriculating at Merton College, Oxford in 1930 on a Rhodes Scholarship. After graduation, he dedicated himself to a career as a professional writer, and began publishing books on history and archaeology (some of which were co-authored by his wife, Mary Elting Folsom). He also worked as a guide in the Rocky Mountains. He served as an able bodied seaman in the US Merchant Marine during the Second World War.

His interest in the rights of Native and Black Americans led to his extensive involvement in radical leftist organizations in the US. He was one of the founding members of the League of American Writers, and served as its executive secretary from 1937 to 1943, following the resignation of Waldo Frank, who had expressed doubts about Stalin's show trials in Moscow. The League closely cooperated with the Communist Party, and Folsom himself was an active party member.

During the McCarthyism campaign he published his books under various pseudonyms: Benjamin Brewster, Chase Elwell, Michael Gorham, Lyman Hopkins, Horatio D. Jones, Troy Nesbit, and Philip Stander.

His wife Mary Elting (1906—2005) was also a writer and a journalist. They had a son, Michael (1938-1990), and a daughter, Rachel (born 1944).

== Selected works ==
=== Published under his own name ===
- Search In The Desert (1955)
- Exploring American Caves: Their History, Geology, Lore, and Location: a Spelunker's Guide (1956)
- Fury and The Mystery At Trappers' Hole (1959)
- Wagon Train (1959)
- The Story of Archaeology of The Americas (1960) with Mary Elting Folsom
- America's Ancient Treasures: A Guide To Archaeological Sites and Museums In The United States and Canada (1962) with Mary Elting Folsom
- Famous Pioneers (1963)
- The Language Book: From Tom Toms To Telstar (1963), illustrated by John Hull & Tran Hawicke
  - Russian translation: Книга о языке (1974) М. Прогресс
  - French translation: Du tam-tam à telstar, l'aventure du langage
  - Extended version: The whole dramatic story of language: What it is . . . How it began . . . How it changes (1963)
- Soviet Union : The View from Within (1965)
- Science and The Secret of Man's Past (1966)
- The Answer Book of History (1966) with Mary Elting Folsom
- Flags of All Nations and The People Who Live Under Them (1967) with Mary Elting Folsom
- If You Lived In The Days of The Wild Mammoth Hunters (1968) with Mary Elting Folsom
- The Life and Legend of George McJunkin: Black Cowboy (ages 10 & up; 1973)
- Red Power On The Rio Grande: The Native American Revolution of 1680 (1973)
- Indian Uprising On The Rio Grande: The Pueblo Revolt of 1680 (1996)
- Impatient Armies of The Poor: The Story of Collective Action of The Unemployed, 1808—1942 (1991)
- Days of Anger, Days of Hope: A Memoir of The League of American Writers, 1937—1942 (1994)
