= 173rd New York State Legislature =

New York state legislative session

| ← | 172nd | 174th | → |
- New York State Capitol (2009)

Overview
- Legislative body: New York State Legislature
- Jurisdiction: New York, United States
- Term: January 1, 1961 – December 31, 1962

Senate
- Members: 58
- President: Lt. Gov. Malcolm Wilson (R)
- Temporary President: Walter J. Mahoney (R)
- Party control: Republican (33–25)

Assembly
- Members: 150
- Speaker: Joseph F. Carlino (R)
- Party control: Republican (84–66)

Sessions
- 1st: January 4 – March 25, 1961
- 2nd: August 21, 1961 –
- 3rd: November 9 – 10, 1961
- 4th: January 3 – March 31, 1962

The 173rd New York State Legislature, consisting of the New York State Senate and the New York State Assembly, met from January 4, 1961, to March 31, 1962, during the third and fourth years of Nelson Rockefeller's governorship, in Albany.

== Background ==
Under the provisions of the New York Constitution of 1938, re-apportioned in 1953, 58 Senators and 150 assemblymen were elected in single-seat districts for two-year terms. The senatorial districts consisted either of one or more entire counties; or a contiguous area within a single county. The counties which were divided into more than one senatorial district were Kings (nine districts), New York (six), Queens (five), Bronx (four), Erie (three), Nassau (three), Westchester (three), Monroe (two) and Onondaga (two). The Assembly districts consisted either of a single entire county (except Hamilton Co.), or of contiguous area within one county.

At this time there were two major political parties: the Republican Party and the Democratic Party. The Liberal Party also nominated tickets.

== Elections ==
The 1960 New York state election was held on November 8. The only two statewide elective offices were two seats on the New York Court of Appeals. Two Republican judges were elected, Stanley H. Fuld with Democratic and Liberal endorsement; and Sydney F. Foster with Liberal endorsement. The approximate party strength at this election, as expressed by the average vote for the judges on the different tickets, was: Republicans 3,281,000; Democrats 3,247,000; and Liberals 413,000.

4 of the 7 women members of the previous legislature—State Senator Janet Hill Gordon (Republican), a lawyer of Norwich; and Assemblywomen Bessie A. Buchanan (Democrat), a retired musical actress and dancer of Harlem; Dorothy Bell Lawrence (Republican), a former school teacher of Manhattan; and Aileen B. Ryan (Democrat), a former school teacher of the Bronx—were re-elected.

The 1961 New York state election was held on November 7. No statewide elective offices were up for election. Three vacancies in the Assembly were filled.

== Sessions ==
The Legislature met for the first regular session (the 184th) at the State Capitol in Albany on January 4, 1961; and adjourned on March 25.

Joseph F. Carlino (Rep.) was re-elected Speaker.

Walter J. Mahoney (Rep.) was re-elected Temporary President of the State Senate.

The Legislature met for a special session at the State Capitol in Albany on August 21, 1961; and adjourned after a session of six hours. This session was called to consider legislation concerning New York City's school system.

The Legislature met for another special session at the State Capitol in Albany on November 9, 1961; and adjourned on the next day. This session was called to consider legislation concerning the creation of fallout shelters at schools and colleges, and the re-apportionment of New York's congressional districts under the 1960 U.S. census.

The Legislature met for the second regular session (the 185th) at the State Capitol in Albany on January 3, 1962; and adjourned on March 31.

== State Senate ==
=== Districts ===
- 1st District: Suffolk County
- 2nd, 3rd and 4th District: Parts of Nassau County
- 5th, 6th, 7th, 8th and 9th District: Parts of Queens County, i.e. the Borough of Queens
- 10th, 11th, 12th, 13th, 14th, 15th, 16th, 17th and 18th District: Parts of Kings County, i.e. the Borough of Brooklyn
- 19th District: Richmond County, i.e. the Borough of Richmond (now the Borough of Staten Island)
- 20th, 21st, 22nd, 23rd, 24th and 25th District: Parts of New York County, i.e. the Borough of Manhattan
- 26th, 27th, 28th and 29th District: Parts of Bronx County, i.e. the Borough of the Bronx
- 30th, 31st and 32nd District: Parts of Westchester County
- 33rd District: Orange and Rockland counties
- 34th District: Delaware, Greene, Sullivan and Ulster counties
- 35th District: Columbia, Dutchess and Putnam counties
- 36th District: Albany County
- 37th District: Rensselaer and Washington counties
- 38th District: Schenectady and Schoharie counties
- 39th District: Essex, Saratoga and Warren counties
- 40th District: Clinton, Franklin and St. Lawrence counties
- 41st District: Fulton, Hamilton, Herkimer and Montgomery counties
- 42nd District: Oneida County
- 43rd District: Jefferson, Lewis and Oswego
- 44th and 45th District: Parts of Onondaga County
- 46th District: Chenango, Cortland, Madison and Otsego counties
- 47th District: Broome County
- 48th District: Cayuga, Tioga and Tompkins counties
- 49th District: Chemung and Steuben counties
- 50th District: Ontario, Schuyler, Seneca, Wayne and Yates counties
- 51st and 52nd District: Parts of Monroe County
- 53rd District: Allegany, Genesee, Livingston, Orleans and Wyoming counties
- 54th District: Niagara County
- 55th, 56th and 57th District: Parts of Erie County
- 58th District: Cattaraugus and Chautauqua counties

=== Senators ===
The asterisk (*) denotes members of the previous Legislature who continued in office as members of this Legislature. Ivan Warner changed from the Assembly to the Senate at the beginning of this Legislature.

Note: For brevity, the chairmanships omit the words "...the Committee on (the)..."

| District | Senator | Party | Notes |
|---|---|---|---|
| 1st | Elisha T. Barrett* | Republican | |
| 2nd | Daniel G. Albert* | Republican | on November 6, 1962, elected to the New York Supreme Court |
| 3rd | Henry M. Curran | Republican | |
| 4th | Edward J. Speno* | Republican | |
| 5th | Jack E. Bronston* | Democrat | |
| 6th | Irving Mosberg* | Democrat | |
| 7th | Seymour R. Thaler* | Democrat | |
| 8th | Thomas A. Duffy* | Democrat | |
| 9th | Thomas J. Mackell* | Democrat | |
| 10th | Simon J. Liebowitz* | Democrat | |
| 11th | Walter E. Cooke* | Democrat | |
| 12th | Jeremiah B. Bloom* | Democrat | |
| 13th | Frank Composto* | Democrat | on November 6, 1962, elected to the New York City Civil Court |
| 14th | William T. Conklin* | Republican | |
| 15th | Frank J. Pino* | Democrat | |
| 16th | William Rosenblatt* | Democrat | |
| 17th | Samuel L. Greenberg* | Democrat | |
| 18th | Harry Gittleson* | Democrat | on November 6, 1962, elected to the New York City Civil Court |
| 19th | John J. Marchi* | Republican | |
| 20th | MacNeil Mitchell* | Republican | |
| 21st | James Lopez Watson* | Democrat | |
| 22nd | John P. Morrissey* | Democrat | |
| 23rd | Joseph Zaretzki* | Democrat | Minority Leader |
| 24th | Joseph R. Marro* | Democrat | |
| 25th | Manfred Ohrenstein | Democrat | |
| 26th | Harry Kraf* | Democrat | |
| 27th | Ivan Warner* | Democrat | |
| 28th | Abraham Bernstein | Democrat | |
| 29th | Joseph E. Marine | Democrat | |
| 30th | Hunter Meighan* | Republican | |
| 31st | George W. Cornell* | Republican | |
| 32nd | William F. Condon* | Republican | |
| 33rd | D. Clinton Dominick III* | Republican | |
| 34th | E. Ogden Bush* | Republican | |
| 35th | Ernest I. Hatfield* | Republican | |
| 36th | Julian B. Erway* | Democrat | |
| 37th | Albert Berkowitz* | Republican | |
| 38th | Owen M. Begley* | Democrat | |
| 39th | George Eustis Paine | Republican | |
| 40th | Robert C. McEwen* | Republican | |
| 41st | Walter Van Wiggeren* | Republican | |
| 42nd | Fred J. Rath* | Republican | |
| 43rd | Henry A. Wise* | Republican | |
| 44th | Lawrence M. Rulison* | Republican | |
| 45th | John H. Hughes* | Republican | |
| 46th | Janet Hill Gordon* | Republican | |
| 47th | Warren M. Anderson* | Republican | |
| 48th | George R. Metcalf* | Republican | |
| 49th | Harold A. Jerry Jr.* | Republican | |
| 50th | Dutton Peterson* | Republican | |
| 51st | Frank E. Van Lare* | Republican | |
| 52nd | Thomas Laverne | Republican | |
| 53rd | Austin W. Erwin* | Republican | Chairman of Finance |
| 54th | Earl W. Brydges* | Republican | |
| 55th | Walter J. Mahoney* | Republican | re-elected Temporary President |
| 56th | Frank J. Glinski* | Democrat | |
| 57th | John H. Cooke* | Republican | on March 30, 1962, appointed to the New York Court of Claims |
| 58th | George H. Pierce* | Republican | Chairman of Judiciary |

=== Employees ===
- Secretary: John J. Sandler, died on March 4, 1961
  - William S. King, acting from March 4 to May 4, 1961
  - John J. Sullivan, from May 4, 1961

== State Assembly ==
=== Assemblymen ===
The asterisk (*) denotes members of the previous Legislature who continued in office as members of this Legislature.

Note: For brevity, the chairmanships omit the words "...the Committee on (the)..."

| District | | Assemblymen | Party | Notes |
|---|---|---|---|---|
| Albany | 1st | Frank P. Cox* | Democrat | |
| Albany | 2nd | Harvey M. Lifset* | Democrat | |
| Allegany | | Don O. Cummings | Republican | |
| Bronx | 1st | Donald J. Sullivan* | Democrat | |
| Bronx | 2nd | Sidney H. Asch* | Democrat | resigned on January 19, 1961, appointed to the Municipal Court |
| Bronx | 2nd | Burton M. Fine | Democrat | on November 7, 1961, elected to fill vacancy |
| Bronx | 3rd | Jerome Schutzer | Democrat | |
| Bronx | 4th | Felipe N. Torres* | Democrat | |
| Bronx | 5th | Melville E. Abrams* | Democrat | |
| Bronx | 6th | Murray Lewinter | Democrat | |
| Bronx | 7th | John T. Satriale* | Democrat | |
| Bronx | 8th | Alexander Chananau* | Democrat | |
| Bronx | 9th | William Kapelman* | Democrat | |
| Bronx | 10th | Ferdinand J. Mondello | Democrat | |
| Bronx | 11th | Aileen B. Ryan* | Democrat | |
| Bronx | 12th | Fred W. Eggert Jr.* | Democrat | |
| Broome | 1st | Daniel S. Dickinson Jr.* | Republican | |
| Broome | 2nd | George L. Ingalls* | Republican | Majority Leader |
| Cattaraugus | | Jeremiah J. Moriarty | Republican | |
| Cayuga | | George M. Michaels | Democrat | |
| Chautauqua | | A. Bruce Manley* | Republican | |
| Chemung | | Harry J. Tifft* | Republican | |
| Chenango | | Guy L. Marvin* | Republican | |
| Clinton | | Robert J. Feinberg* | Republican | |
| Columbia | | Willard C. Drumm* | Republican | |
| Cortland | | Louis H. Folmer* | Republican | |
| Delaware | | Edwyn E. Mason* | Republican | |
| Dutchess | | Robert Watson Pomeroy* | Republican | |
| Erie | 1st | Stephen R. Greco* | Democrat | |
| Erie | 2nd | William E. Adams* | Republican | |
| Erie | 3rd | Vincent P. Arnone | Democrat | |
| Erie | 4th | Frank J. Caffery* | Democrat | |
| Erie | 5th | John B. Lis* | Democrat | |
| Erie | 6th | Albert J. Hausbeck | Democrat | |
| Erie | 7th | Julius Volker* | Republican | |
| Erie | 8th | William Sadler* | Republican | |
| Essex | | Grant W. Johnson* | Republican | |
| Franklin | | Hayward H. Plumadore* | Republican | |
| Fulton and Hamilton | | Joseph R. Younglove* | Republican | |
| Genesee | | John E. Johnson* | Republican | |
| Greene | | William E. Brady* | Republican | |
| Herkimer | | Leo A. Lawrence* | Republican | |
| Jefferson | | Orin S. Wilcox* | Republican | |
| Kings | 1st | Max M. Turshen* | Democrat | |
| Kings | 2nd | Samuel Bonom* | Democrat | died on December 15, 1962 |
| Kings | 3rd | Joseph J. Dowd | Democrat | |
| Kings | 4th | Harold W. Cohn | Democrat | |
| Kings | 5th | Leonard E. Yoswein | Democrat | |
| Kings | 6th | Bertram L. Baker* | Democrat | |
| Kings | 7th | Louis Kalish* | Democrat | |
| Kings | 8th | Guy James Mangano* | Democrat | |
| Kings | 9th | Robert F. Kelly | Republican | |
| Kings | 10th | John J. Ryan* | Democrat | |
| Kings | 11th | George A. Cincotta* | Democrat | |
| Kings | 12th | Luigi R. Marano* | Republican | |
| Kings | 13th | Lawrence P. Murphy* | Democrat | |
| Kings | 14th | Edward S. Lentol* | Democrat | |
| Kings | 15th | Alfred A. Lama* | Democrat | |
| Kings | 16th | Irwin Brownstein* | Democrat | |
| Kings | 17th | Samuel I. Berman* | Democrat | |
| Kings | 18th | Stanley Steingut* | Democrat | |
| Kings | 19th | Joseph Kottler* | Democrat | |
| Kings | 20th | Joseph R. Corso* | Democrat | |
| Kings | 21st | Bertram L. Podell* | Democrat | |
| Kings | 22nd | Anthony J. Travia* | Democrat | Minority Leader |
| Lewis | | Dwight N. Dudo* | Republican | |
| Livingston | | Kenneth R. Willard* | Republican | |
| Madison | | Harold I. Tyler* | Republican | |
| Monroe | 1st | J. Eugene Goddard* | Republican | |
| Monroe | 2nd | S. William Rosenberg | Republican | |
| Monroe | 3rd | Paul B. Hanks Jr.* | Republican | |
| Monroe | 4th | Charles F. Stockmeister | Democrat | |
| Montgomery | | Donald A. Campbell* | Republican | |
| Nassau | 1st | Anthony Barbiero* | Republican | |
| Nassau | 2nd | Joseph F. Carlino* | Republican | re-elected Speaker |
| Nassau | 3rd | John E. Kingston* | Republican | |
| Nassau | 4th | Edwin J. Fehrenbach* | Republican | |
| Nassau | 5th | Francis P. McCloskey* | Republican | |
| Nassau | 6th | Palmer D. Farrington* | Republican | on June 26, 1961, appointed Presiding Supervisor of Hempstead |
| Nassau | 6th | Robert M. Blakeman | Republican | on November 7, 1961, elected to fill vacancy |
| New York | 1st | William F. Passannante* | Democrat | |
| New York | 2nd | Louis DeSalvio* | Democrat | |
| New York | 3rd | Francis W. Doheny* | Democrat | |
| New York | 4th | Samuel A. Spiegel* | Democrat | |
| New York | 5th | Bentley Kassal* | Democrat | |
| New York | 6th | Joseph J. Weiser* | Democrat | |
| New York | 7th | Daniel M. Kelly* | Democrat | |
| New York | 8th | Dorothy Bell Lawrence | Republican | |
| New York | 9th | John R. Brook* | Republican | |
| New York | 10th | Mark Lane | Democrat | |
| New York | 11th | Lloyd E. Dickens* | Democrat | |
| New York | 12th | Bessie A. Buchanan* | Democrat | |
| New York | 13th | Orest V. Maresca* | Democrat | |
| New York | 14th | Jose Ramos-Lopez* | Democrat | |
| New York | 15th | John J. Walsh* | Democrat | |
| New York | 16th | Frank G. Rossetti* | Democrat | |
| Niagara | 1st | Harold H. Altro* | Republican | |
| Niagara | 2nd | Ernest Curto* | Republican | |
| Oneida | 1st | Paul A. Worlock | Democrat | |
| Oneida | 2nd | William S. Calli* | Republican | |
| Onondaga | 1st | Don H. Brown* | Republican | |
| Onondaga | 2nd | George P. Savage | Democrat | |
| Onondaga | 3rd | Philip R. Chase* | Republican | |
| Ontario | | Robert M. Quigley* | Republican | |
| Orange | 1st | Daniel Becker* | Republican | |
| Orange | 2nd | Wilson C. Van Duzer* | Republican | |
| Orleans | | Alonzo L. Waters* | Republican | |
| Oswego | | Edward F. Crawford* | Republican | |
| Otsego | | Paul L. Talbot* | Republican | |
| Putnam | | Willis H. Stephens* | Republican | |
| Queens | 1st | Thomas V. LaFauci* | Democrat | |
| Queens | 2nd | William C. Brennan* | Democrat | |
| Queens | 3rd | Charles T. Eckstein* | Republican | |
| Queens | 4th | Jules G. Sabbatino* | Democrat | |
| Queens | 5th | William G. Giaccio* | Democrat | |
| Queens | 6th | Michael G. Rice* | Democrat | |
| Queens | 7th | Moses M. Weinstein* | Democrat | |
| Queens | 8th | Michael J. Capanegro | Democrat | |
| Queens | 9th | Fred W. Preller* | Republican | Chairman of Ways and Means |
| Queens | 10th | Louis Wallach* | Democrat | |
| Queens | 11th | Alfred D. Lerner* | Republican | |
| Queens | 12th | J. Lewis Fox* | Democrat | |
| Queens | 13th | Anthony P. Savarese Jr.* | Republican | |
| Rensselaer | | Douglas Hudson* | Republican | |
| Richmond | 1st | Edward J. Amann Jr.* | Republican | |
| Richmond | 2nd | Lucio F. Russo* | Republican | |
| Rockland | | Joseph F. X. Nowicki | Republican | |
| St. Lawrence | | Verner M. Ingram* | Republican | |
| Saratoga | | John L. Ostrander* | Republican | resigned to run for Surrogate of Saratoga County |
| Saratoga | | Stanley L. Van Rensselaer | Republican | on November 7, 1961, elected to fill vacancy |
| Schenectady | | Joseph F. Egan* | Republican | |
| Schoharie | | Russell Selkirk* | Republican | |
| Schuyler | | Jerry W. Black* | Republican | |
| Seneca | | Theodore D. Day | Republican | |
| Steuben | | Charles D. Henderson* | Republican | |
| Suffolk | 1st | Perry B. Duryea Jr. | Republican | |
| Suffolk | 2nd | Prescott B. Huntington* | Republican | |
| Suffolk | 3rd | James R. Grover Jr.* | Republican | on November 6, 1962, elected to the 88th U.S. Congress |
| Sullivan | | Hyman E. Mintz* | Republican | |
| Tioga | | Richard C. Lounsberry* | Republican | |
| Tompkins | | Ray S. Ashbery* | Republican | |
| Ulster | | Kenneth L. Wilson* | Republican | |
| Warren | | Richard J. Bartlett | Republican | |
| Washington | | William J. Reid* | Republican | |
| Wayne | | Joseph C. Finley | Republican | |
| Westchester | 1st | Christian H. Armbruster | Republican | |
| Westchester | 2nd | P. Boice Esser | Republican | |
| Westchester | 3rd | George E. Van Cott | Republican | |
| Westchester | 4th | Anthony B. Gioffre* | Republican | |
| Westchester | 5th | John J. S. Mead | Republican | |
| Westchester | 6th | Bernard G. Gordon | Republican | |
| Wyoming | | Harold L. Peet* | Republican | |
| Yates | | Paul R. Taylor* | Republican | |

=== Employees ===
- Clerk: Ansley B. Borkowski
- Sergeant-at-Arms: Raymond J. Roche
- Deputy Journal Clerk: Maude E. Ten Eyck

== Sources ==
- N.Y. Legislature Remains In Control of Republicans in the Tonawanda News, of Tonawanda, on November 9, 1960
- Members of the New York Senate (1960s) at Political Graveyard
- Members of the New York Assembly (1960s) at Political Graveyard
