= 174th New York State Legislature =

New York state legislative session

←	173rd	175th	→
- New York State Capitol (2009)

Overview
- Legislative body: New York State Legislature
- Jurisdiction: New York, United States
- Term: January 1, 1963 – December 31, 1964

Senate
- Members: 58
- President: Lt. Gov. Malcolm Wilson (R)
- Temporary President: Walter J. Mahoney (R)
- Party control: Republican (32–26)

Assembly
- Members: 150
- Speaker: Joseph F. Carlino (R)
- Party control: Republican (85–65)

Sessions
- 1st: January 9 – April 6, 1963
- 2nd: January 8 – March 27, 1964
- 3rd: April 15 – 16, 1964
- 4th: December 15 – 30, 1964

The 174th New York State Legislature, consisting of the New York State Senate and the New York State Assembly, met from January 9, 1963, to December 30, 1964, during the fifth and sixth years of Nelson Rockefeller's governorship, in Albany.

== Background ==
Under the provisions of the New York Constitution of 1938, re-apportioned in 1953, 58 Senators and 150 assemblymen were elected in single-seat districts for two-year terms. The senatorial districts consisted either of one or more entire counties; or a contiguous area within a single county. The counties which were divided into more than one senatorial district were Kings (nine districts), New York (six), Queens (five), Bronx (four), Erie (three), Nassau (three), Westchester (three), Monroe (two) and Onondaga (two). The Assembly districts consisted either of a single entire county (except Hamilton Co.), or of contiguous area within one county.

At this time there were two major political parties: the Republican Party and the Democratic Party. The Liberal Party, the Conservative Party, the Socialist Workers Party and the Socialist Labor Party also nominated tickets.

== Elections ==
The 1962 New York state election was held on November 6. Governor Nelson Rockefeller and Lieutenant Governor Malcolm Wilson were re-elected, both Republicans. The other four statewide elective offices were carried by two Republicans; and two Democrats with Liberal endorsement. The approximate party strength at this election, as expressed by the vote for Governor and Lieutenant Governor, was: Republicans 3,082,000; Democrats 2,310,000; Liberals 243,000; Conservatives 142,000; Socialist Workers 20,000; and Socialist Labor 10,000.

3 of the 4 women members of the previous legislature—Assemblywomen Dorothy Bell Lawrence (Republican), a former school teacher of Manhattan; and Aileen B. Ryan (Democrat), a former school teacher of the Bronx—were re-elected. Constance E. Cook (Republican), a lawyer of Ithaca, was also elected to the Assembly.

The 1963 New York state election was held on Tuesday November 5. The only statewide elective office up for election was a seat on the New York Court of Appeals. Democrat Francis Bergan was elected with Republican and Liberal endorsement. One vacancy in the State Senate, and two vacancies in the Assembly, were filled.

On February 4, 1964, Constance Baker Motley, a lawyer of Manhattan, was elected to the State Senate, to fill a vacancy.

== Sessions ==
The Legislature met for the first regular session (the 186th) at the State Capitol in Albany on January 9, 1963; and adjourned on April 6.

Joseph F. Carlino (Rep.) was re-elected Speaker.

Walter J. Mahoney (Rep.) was re-elected Temporary President of the State Senate.

The Legislature met for the second regular session (the 187th) at the State Capitol in Albany on January 8, 1964; and adjourned on March 27.

The Legislature met for a special session at the State Capitol in Albany on April 15, 1964; and adjourned on the next day. This session was called to revise the liquor laws.

In 1964, the U.S. Supreme Court handed down several decisions establishing that State legislatures should follow the One man, one vote rule to apportion their election districts. A special Federal Statutory Court declared the New York apportionment formulae for both the State Senate and the State Assembly unconstitutional, and the State Legislature was ordered to re-apportion the seats by April 1, 1965. The court also ruled that the 1964 legislative election should be held under the 1954 apportionment, but those elected could serve only for one year (in 1965), and an election under the new apportionment should be held in November 1965. Senators John H. Hughes and Lawrence M. Rulison (both Rep.) questioned the authority of the federal court to shorten the term of the 1964 electees, alleging excessive costs for the additional election in an off-year.

At the New York state election, 1964, on November 3, Democratic majorities were elected to both the State Senate and the State Assembly for the session of 1965.

The lame-duck Legislature met for another special session at the State Capitol in Albany on December 15, 1964; and adjourned on December 30. This session was called to re-apportion the legislative districts for the 1965 election, gerrymandering the districts according to the wishes of the Republican majority before the Democrats would take over the Legislature in January. The number of seats in the State Senate was increased to 65, and the number of seats in the Assembly to 165. County representation was abandoned in favor of population-proportional districts, and the new Assembly districts were numbered from 1 to 165.

== State Senate ==
=== Districts ===
- 1st District: Suffolk County
- 2nd, 3rd and 4th District: Parts of Nassau County
- 5th, 6th, 7th, 8th and 9th District: Parts of Queens County, i.e. the Borough of Queens
- 10th, 11th, 12th, 13th, 14th, 15th, 16th, 17th and 18th District: Parts of Kings County, i.e. the Borough of Brooklyn
- 19th District: Richmond County, i.e. the Borough of Richmond (now the Borough of Staten Island)
- 20th, 21st, 22nd, 23rd, 24th and 25th District: Parts of New York County, i.e. the Borough of Manhattan
- 26th, 27th, 28th and 29th District: Parts of Bronx County, i.e. the Borough of the Bronx
- 30th, 31st and 32nd District: Parts of Westchester County
- 33rd District: Orange and Rockland counties
- 34th District: Delaware, Greene, Sullivan and Ulster counties
- 35th District: Columbia, Dutchess and Putnam counties
- 36th District: Albany County
- 37th District: Rensselaer and Washington counties
- 38th District: Schenectady and Schoharie counties
- 39th District: Essex, Saratoga and Warren counties
- 40th District: Clinton, Franklin and St. Lawrence counties
- 41st District: Fulton, Hamilton, Herkimer and Montgomery counties
- 42nd District: Oneida County
- 43rd District: Jefferson, Lewis and Oswego
- 44th and 45th District: Parts of Onondaga County
- 46th District: Chenango, Cortland, Madison and Otsego counties
- 47th District: Broome County
- 48th District: Cayuga, Tioga and Tompkins counties
- 49th District: Chemung and Steuben counties
- 50th District: Ontario, Schuyler, Seneca, Wayne and Yates counties
- 51st and 52nd District: Parts of Monroe County
- 53rd District: Allegany, Genesee, Livingston, Orleans and Wyoming counties
- 54th District: Niagara County
- 55th, 56th and 57th District: Parts of Erie County
- 58th District: Cattaraugus and Chautauqua counties

=== Senators ===
The asterisk (*) denotes members of the previous Legislature who continued in office as members of this Legislature. Guy James Mangano, Edward S. Lentol and Jeremiah J. Moriarty changed from the Assembly to the Senate at the beginning of this Legislature. Assemblyman Irwin R. Brownstein was elected to fill a vacancy in the Senate.

Note: For brevity, the chairmanships omit the words "...the Committee on (the)..."

District	Senator	Party	Notes
1st	Elisha T. Barrett*	Republican	Chairman of Finance
2nd	Norman F. Lent	Republican	
3rd	Henry M. Curran*	Republican	
4th	Edward J. Speno*	Republican	
5th	Jack E. Bronston*	Dem./Lib.	
6th	Irving Mosberg*	Dem./Lib.	
7th	Seymour R. Thaler*	Dem./Lib.	
8th	Thomas A. Duffy*	Dem./Lib.	
9th	Thomas J. Mackell*	Dem./Lib.	
10th	Simon J. Liebowitz*	Dem./Lib.	
11th	Walter E. Cooke*	Democrat	
12th	Jeremiah B. Bloom*	Dem./Lib.	
13th	Guy James Mangano*	Dem./Lib.	
14th	William T. Conklin*	Republican	
15th	Frank J. Pino*	Dem./Lib.	resigned to run for the New York Supreme Court
15th	Irwin Brownstein*	Democrat	on November 5, 1963, elected to fill vacancy
16th	William Rosenblatt*	Dem./Lib.	
17th	Samuel L. Greenberg*	Dem./Lib.	
18th	Edward S. Lentol*	Dem./Lib.	
19th	John J. Marchi*	Republican	
20th	MacNeil Mitchell*	Republican	Chairman of Judiciary
21st	James Lopez Watson*	Dem./Lib.	on November 5, 1963, elected to the New York City Civil Court
21st	Constance Baker Motley	Democrat	on February 4, 1964, elected to fill vacancy
22nd	Jerome L. Wilson	Dem./Lib.	
23rd	Joseph Zaretzki*	Dem./Lib.	Minority Leader
24th	Joseph R. Marro*	Dem./Lib.	on November 3, 1964, elected to the New York City Civil Court
25th	Manfred Ohrenstein*	Dem./Lib.	
26th	Harry Kraf*	Democrat	
27th	Ivan Warner*	Democrat	
28th	Abraham Bernstein*	Democrat	
29th	Joseph E. Marine*	Democrat	
30th	Hunter Meighan*	Republican	
31st	George W. Cornell*	Republican	Chairman of Public Service
32nd	William F. Condon*	Republican	
33rd	D. Clinton Dominick III*	Rep./Lib.	
34th	E. Ogden Bush*	Republican	
35th	Ernest I. Hatfield*	Republican	Chairman of Banking; and of Ethics
36th	Julian B. Erway*	Dem./Lib.	
37th	Albert Berkowitz*	Republican	
38th	Owen M. Begley*	Dem./Lib.	
39th	George Eustis Paine*	Republican	Chairman of Affairs of Villages
40th	Robert C. McEwen*	Republican	on November 3, 1964, elected to the 89th U.S. Congress
41st	Walter Van Wiggeren*	Republican	
42nd	Fred J. Rath*	Republican	Chairman of Penal Institutions
43rd	Henry A. Wise*	Republican	Chairman of Public Welfare
44th	Lawrence M. Rulison*	Republican	
45th	John H. Hughes*	Republican	
46th	Leighton A. Hope	Republican	
47th	Warren M. Anderson*	Republican	
48th	George R. Metcalf*	Republican	
49th	William T. Smith	Republican	
50th	Dutton Peterson*	Republican	died on October 20, 1964
51st	Frank E. Van Lare*	Republican	
52nd	Thomas Laverne*	Rep./Lib.	
53rd	Barber B. Conable Jr.	Republican	on November 3, 1964, elected to the 89th U.S. Congress
54th	Earl W. Brydges*	Republican	Chairman of Education
55th	Walter J. Mahoney*	Republican	re-elected Temporary President
56th	Frank J. Glinski*	Dem./Lib.	
57th	Richard T. Cooke	Republican	
58th	Jeremiah J. Moriarty*	Republican	

=== Employees ===
- Secretary: Albert J. Abrams
- Deputy Secretary: Fred Forbes

== State Assembly ==
=== Assemblymen ===
The asterisk (*) denotes members of the previous Legislature who continued in office as members of this Legislature.

Note: For brevity, the chairmanships omit the words "...the Committee on (the)..."

District		Assemblymen	Party	Notes
Albany	1st	Frank P. Cox*	Democrat	
Albany	2nd	Harvey M. Lifset*	Democrat	
Allegany		Don O. Cummings*	Republican	
Bronx	1st	Donald J. Sullivan*	Democrat	
Bronx	2nd	Burton M. Fine*	Democrat	
Bronx	3rd	Jerome Schutzer*	Democrat	
Bronx	4th	Frank Torres	Democrat	
Bronx	5th	Melville E. Abrams*	Democrat	
Bronx	6th	Murray Lewinter*	Democrat	
Bronx	7th	John T. Satriale*	Democrat	
Bronx	8th	Alexander Chananau*	Democrat	
Bronx	9th	Burton Hecht	Democrat	
Bronx	10th	Ferdinand J. Mondello*	Democrat	
Bronx	11th	Aileen B. Ryan*	Democrat	
Bronx	12th	Fred W. Eggert Jr.*	Democrat	
Broome	1st	Daniel S. Dickinson Jr.*	Republican	
Broome	2nd	George L. Ingalls*	Republican	Majority Leader
Cattaraugus		James F. Hastings	Republican	
Cayuga		George M. Michaels*	Democrat	
Chautauqua		A. Bruce Manley*	Republican	
Chemung		L. Richard Marshall	Republican	
Chenango		Guy L. Marvin*	Republican	
Clinton		Robert J. Feinberg*	Republican	
Columbia		Willard C. Drumm*	Republican	
Cortland		Louis H. Folmer*	Republican	
Delaware		Edwyn E. Mason*	Republican	
Dutchess		Robert Watson Pomeroy*	Republican	Chairman of Public Service
Erie	1st	Stephen R. Greco*	Democrat	
Erie	2nd	William E. Adams*	Republican	
Erie	3rd	Vincent P. Arnone*	Democrat	
Erie	4th	Francis J. Griffin	Democrat	
Erie	5th	John B. Lis*	Democrat	
Erie	6th	Albert J. Hausbeck*	Democrat	
Erie	7th	Julius Volker*	Republican	
Erie	8th	William Sadler*	Republican	
Essex		Grant W. Johnson*	Republican	
Franklin		Hayward H. Plumadore*	Republican	
Fulton and Hamilton		Joseph R. Younglove*	Republican	Chairman of Taxation
Genesee		John E. Johnson*	Republican	
Greene		Clarence D. Lane	Republican	
Herkimer		Leo A. Lawrence*	Republican	
Jefferson		Orin S. Wilcox*	Republican	
Kings	1st	Max M. Turshen*	Democrat	
Kings	2nd	vacant		Assemblyman-elect Samuel Bonom died on December 15, 1962
Kings	2nd	Noah Goldstein	Democrat	on February 19, 1963, elected to fill vacancy
Kings	3rd	Joseph J. Dowd*	Democrat	
Kings	4th	Harold W. Cohn*	Democrat	
Kings	5th	Leonard E. Yoswein*	Democrat	
Kings	6th	Bertram L. Baker*	Democrat	
Kings	7th	Louis Kalish*	Democrat	
Kings	8th	William J. Ferrall	Democrat	
Kings	9th	Robert F. Kelly*	Republican	
Kings	10th	John J. Ryan*	Democrat	
Kings	11th	George A. Cincotta*	Democrat	
Kings	12th	Luigi R. Marano*	Republican	Chairman of Aviation
Kings	13th	Lawrence P. Murphy*	Democrat	
Kings	14th	Edward A. Kurmel	Democrat	
Kings	15th	Alfred A. Lama*	Democrat	
Kings	16th	Irwin Brownstein*	Democrat	resigned to run for the State Senate
Kings	16th	Salvatore J. Grieco	Democrat	on November 5, 1963, elected to fill vacancy
Kings	17th	Thomas R. Jones	Democrat	on November 3, 1964, elected to the New York City Civil Court
Kings	18th	Stanley Steingut*	Democrat	
Kings	19th	Joseph Kottler*	Democrat	
Kings	20th	Joseph R. Corso*	Democrat	
Kings	21st	Bertram L. Podell*	Democrat	
Kings	22nd	Anthony J. Travia*	Democrat	Minority Leader
Lewis		Dwight N. Dudo*	Republican	
Livingston		Kenneth R. Willard*	Republican	
Madison		Harold I. Tyler*	Republican	
Monroe	1st	J. Eugene Goddard*	Republican	
Monroe	2nd	S. William Rosenberg*	Republican	
Monroe	3rd	Paul B. Hanks Jr.*	Republican	
Monroe	4th	Charles F. Stockmeister*	Democrat	
Montgomery		Donald A. Campbell*	Republican	
Nassau	1st	Anthony Barbiero*	Republican	Chairman of Pensions
Nassau	2nd	Joseph F. Carlino*	Republican	re-elected Speaker
Nassau	3rd	John E. Kingston*	Republican	
Nassau	4th	Edwin J. Fehrenbach*	Republican	
Nassau	5th	Francis P. McCloskey*	Republican	
Nassau	6th	Robert M. Blakeman*	Republican	
New York	1st	William F. Passannante*	Democrat	
New York	2nd	Louis DeSalvio*	Democrat	
New York	3rd	Jerome Kretchmer	Democrat	
New York	4th	Jerome W. Marks	Democrat	
New York	5th	Albert H. Blumenthal	Democrat	
New York	6th	Paul J. Curran	Republican	
New York	7th	Daniel M. Kelly*	Democrat	
New York	8th	Dorothy Bell Lawrence	Republican	on May 2, 1963, appointed to the Unemployment Insurance Appeal Board
New York	8th	John M. Burns	Republican	on November 5, 1963, elected to fill vacancy
New York	9th	John R. Brook*	Republican	
New York	10th	Carlos M. Rios	Democrat	
New York	11th	Lloyd E. Dickens*	Democrat	
New York	12th	Mark T. Southall	Democrat	
New York	13th	Orest V. Maresca*	Democrat	
New York	14th	Jose Ramos-Lopez*	Democrat	
New York	15th	John J. Walsh*	Democrat	
New York	16th	Frank G. Rossetti*	Democrat	
Niagara	1st	Harold H. Altro*	Republican	
Niagara	2nd	Ernest Curto*	Republican	
Oneida	1st	Paul A. Worlock*	Democrat	
Oneida	2nd	William S. Calli*	Republican	Chairman of General Laws
Onondaga	1st	Robert Hatch Jr.	Republican	
Onondaga	2nd	John H. Terry	Republican	
Onondaga	3rd	Philip R. Chase*	Republican	
Ontario		Frederick L. Warder	Republican	
Orange	1st	Daniel Becker*	Republican	
Orange	2nd	Wilson C. Van Duzer*	Republican	
Orleans		Alonzo L. Waters*	Republican	
Oswego		Edward F. Crawford*	Republican	
Otsego		Paul L. Talbot*	Republican	Chairman of Agriculture
Putnam		Willis H. Stephens*	Republican	
Queens	1st	Thomas V. LaFauci*	Democrat	
Queens	2nd	William C. Brennan*	Democrat	on July 2, 1964, appointed to the New York City Criminal Court
Queens	3rd	Robert E. Whelan	Democrat	
Queens	4th	Jules G. Sabbatino*	Democrat	
Queens	5th	Martin M. Psaty	Democrat	
Queens	6th	Michael G. Rice*	Democrat	
Queens	7th	Moses M. Weinstein*	Democrat	
Queens	8th	Michael J. Capanegro*	Democrat	
Queens	9th	Fred W. Preller*	Republican	Chairman of Ways and Means
Queens	10th	Louis Wallach*	Democrat	
Queens	11th	Alfred D. Lerner*	Republican	
Queens	12th	J. Lewis Fox*	Democrat	
Queens	13th	Anthony P. Savarese Jr.*	Republican	
Rensselaer		Douglas Hudson*	Republican	
Richmond	1st	Edward J. Amann Jr.*	Republican	
Richmond	2nd	Lucio F. Russo*	Republican	
Rockland		Joseph F. X. Nowicki*	Republican	
St. Lawrence		Verner M. Ingram*	Republican	
Saratoga		Stanley L. Van Rensselaer*	Republican	
Schenectady		Joseph F. Egan*	Republican	died on March 22, 1964
Schoharie		Russell Selkirk*	Republican	
Schuyler		Jerry W. Black*	Republican	Chairman of Internal Affairs
Seneca		Theodore D. Day*	Republican	
Steuben		Charles D. Henderson*	Republican	
Suffolk	1st	Perry B. Duryea Jr.*	Republican	
Suffolk	2nd	Prescott B. Huntington*	Republican	
Suffolk	3rd	John G. McCarthy	Republican	
Sullivan		Hyman E. Mintz*	Republican	
Tioga		Richard C. Lounsberry*	Republican	
Tompkins		Constance E. Cook	Republican	
Ulster		Kenneth L. Wilson*	Republican	
Warren		Richard J. Bartlett	Republican	
Washington		Lawrence E. Corbett Jr.	Republican	
Wayne		Joseph C. Finley*	Republican	
Westchester	1st	Christian H. Armbruster*	Republican	
Westchester	2nd	P. Boice Esser*	Republican	
Westchester	3rd	George E. Van Cott*	Republican	
Westchester	4th	Anthony B. Gioffre*	Republican	
Westchester	5th	John J. S. Mead*	Republican	
Westchester	6th	Bernard G. Gordon*	Republican	
Wyoming		Harold L. Peet*	Republican	
Yates		Paul R. Taylor*	Republican	

=== Employees ===
- Clerk: Ansley B. Borkowski
- Sergeant-at-Arms: Raymond J. Roche
- Deputy Journal Clerk: Maude E. Ten Eyck

== Sources ==
- State Senate In a Nutshell in the Evening Recorder, of Amsterdam, on November 7, 1962 (pg. 2)
- New Lineup for New York State Assembly in the Evening Recorder, of Amsterdam, on November 7, 1962 (pg. 5)
- Capitol Hill Changes: New Faces for '65 in The Knickerbocker News, of Albany, on March 2, 1964
- Members of the New York Senate (1960s) at Political Graveyard
- Members of the New York Assembly (1960s) at Political Graveyard
