= 172nd New York State Legislature =

New York state legislative session

←	171st	173rd	→
- New York State Capitol (2009)

Overview
- Legislative body: New York State Legislature
- Jurisdiction: New York, United States
- Term: January 1, 1959 – December 31, 1960

Senate
- Members: 58
- President: Lt. Gov. Malcolm Wilson (R)
- Temporary President: Walter J. Mahoney (R)
- Party control: Republican (34–24)

Assembly
- Members: 150
- Speaker: Oswald D. Heck (R), until May 21, 1959; Joseph F. Carlino (R), from July 1, 1959
- Party control: Republican (92–58)

Sessions
- 1st: January 7 – March 25, 1959
- 2nd: July 1, 1959 –
- 3rd: January 6 – April 1, 1960

The 172nd New York State Legislature, consisting of the New York State Senate and the New York State Assembly, met from January 7, 1959, to April 1, 1960, during the first and second years of Nelson Rockefeller's governorship, in Albany.

== Background ==
Under the provisions of the New York Constitution of 1938, re-apportioned in 1953, 58 Senators and 150 assemblymen were elected in single-seat districts for two-year terms. The senatorial districts consisted either of one or more entire counties; or a contiguous area within a single county. The counties which were divided into more than one senatorial district were Kings (nine districts), New York (six), Queens (five), Bronx (four), Erie (three), Nassau (three), Westchester (three), Monroe (two) and Onondaga (two). The Assembly districts consisted either of a single entire county (except Hamilton Co.), or of contiguous area within one county.

At this time there were two major political parties: the Republican Party and the Democratic Party. The Liberal Party and the Independent-Socialist Party also nominated tickets.

== Elections ==
The 1958 New York state election, was held on November 4. Nelson Rockefeller was elected Governor, and Assemblyman Malcolm Wilson was elected Lieutenant Governor, both Republicans, defeating the incumbent Democrats W. Averell Harriman and George B. DeLuca. The elections of the other four statewide elective offices resulted in a Democratic State Comptroller with Liberal endorsement, a Republican Attorney General, a Democratic Court of Appeals judge with Liberal and Republican endorsement, and a Republican U.S. Senator. The approximate party strength at this election, as expressed by the vote for Governor/Lieutenant Governor, was: Republicans 3,127,000; Democrats 2,270,000; Liberals 284,000; and Independent-Socialists 32,000.

Assemblywoman Janet Hill Gordon (Rep.), a lawyer of Norwich, was elected to the State Senate. The other four women members of the previous legislature—Assemblywomen Bessie A. Buchanan (Dem.), a retired musical actress and dancer of Harlem; Frances K. Marlatt (Rep.), a lawyer of Mount Vernon; Genesta M. Strong (Rep.), of Plandome Heights; and Mildred F. Taylor (Rep.), a coal dealer of Lyons—were re-elected. Aileen B. Ryan (Dem.), of the Bronx; and Dorothy Bell Lawrence (Rep.), of Manhattan, both former school teachers, were also elected to the Assembly.

The 1959 New York state election, was held on November 3. The only statewide elective office up for election was Chief Judge of the New York Court of Appeals. The senior associate judge, Charles S. Desmond, a Democrat, was elected with Republican and Liberal endorsement. Three vacancies in the State Senate and eight vacancies in the Assembly were filled. Assemblywoman Genesta M. Strong (Rep.) was elected to the State Senate, but did not take her seat in 1960.

== Sessions ==
The Legislature met for the first regular session (the 182nd) at the State Capitol in Albany on January 7, 1959; and adjourned on March 25.

Oswald D. Heck (Rep.) was re-elected Speaker. Heck died on May 21, 1959.

Walter J. Mahoney (Rep.) was re-elected Temporary President of the State Senate.

The Legislature met for a special session at the State Capitol in Albany on July 1, 1959. Majority Leader Joseph F. Carlino (Rep.) was elected Speaker of the Assembly.

The Legislature met for the second regular session (the 183rd) at the State Capitol in Albany on January 6, 1960; and adjourned in the early morning of April 1, 1960.

== State Senate ==
=== Districts ===
- 1st District: Suffolk County
- 2nd, 3rd and 4th District: Parts of Nassau County
- 5th, 6th, 7th, 8th and 9th District: Parts of Queens County, i.e. the Borough of Queens
- 10th, 11th, 12th, 13th, 14th, 15th, 16th, 17th and 18th District: Parts of Kings County, i.e. the Borough of Brooklyn
- 19th District: Richmond County, i.e. the Borough of Richmond (now the Borough of Staten Island)
- 20th, 21st, 22nd, 23rd, 24th and 25th District: Parts of New York County, i.e. the Borough of Manhattan
- 26th, 27th, 28th and 29th District: Parts of Bronx County, i.e. the Borough of the Bronx
- 30th, 31st and 32nd District: Parts of Westchester County
- 33rd District: Orange and Rockland counties
- 34th District: Delaware, Greene, Sullivan and Ulster counties
- 35th District: Columbia, Dutchess and Putnam counties
- 36th District: Albany County
- 37th District: Rensselaer and Washington counties
- 38th District: Schenectady and Schoharie counties
- 39th District: Essex, Saratoga and Warren counties
- 40th District: Clinton, Franklin and St. Lawrence counties
- 41st District: Fulton, Hamilton, Herkimer and Montgomery counties
- 42nd District: Oneida County
- 43rd District: Jefferson, Lewis and Oswego
- 44th and 45th District: Parts of Onondaga County
- 46th District: Chenango, Cortland, Madison and Otsego counties
- 47th District: Broome County
- 48th District: Cayuga, Tioga and Tompkins counties
- 49th District: Chemung and Steuben counties
- 50th District: Ontario, Schuyler, Seneca, Wayne and Yates counties
- 51st and 52nd District: Parts of Monroe County
- 53rd District: Allegany, Genesee, Livingston, Orleans and Wyoming counties
- 54th District: Niagara County
- 55th, 56th and 57th District: Parts of Erie County
- 58th District: Cattaraugus and Chautauqua counties

=== Senators ===
The asterisk (*) denotes members of the previous Legislature who continued in office as members of this Legislature. Frank Composto, D. Clinton Dominick III, Lawrence M. Rulison and Janet Hill Gordon changed from the Assembly to the Senate at the beginning of this Legislature. Assembly members Genesta M. Strong and Hunter Meighan were elected to fill vacancies in the Senate.

Note: For brevity, the chairmanships omit the words "...the Committee on (the)..."

District	Senator	Party	Notes
1st	Elisha T. Barrett*	Republican	
2nd	Daniel G. Albert*	Republican	
3rd	William S. Hults Jr.*	Republican	on April 1, 1959, appointed as Commissioner of Motor Vehicles
3rd	(Genesta M. Strong)*	Republican	on November 3, 1959, elected to fill vacancy; did not take her seat and resigned on January 6, 1960, due to ill health seat remained vacant throughout the 1960 session
4th	Edward J. Speno*	Republican	
5th	Jack E. Bronston	Dem./Lib.	
6th	Irving Mosberg*	Dem./Lib.	
7th	Seymour R. Thaler	Dem./Lib.	
8th	Thomas A. Duffy*	Dem./Lib.	
9th	Thomas J. Mackell*	Dem./Lib.	
10th	Herbert I. Sorin*	Dem./Lib.	on September 18, 1959, appointed as a City Magistrate
10th	Simon J. Liebowitz	Democrat	on November 3, 1959, elected to fill vacancy
11th	Walter E. Cooke*	Dem./Lib.	
12th	Jeremiah B. Bloom*	Dem./Lib.	
13th	Frank Composto*	Dem./Lib.	
14th	William T. Conklin*	Republican	
15th	Frank J. Pino*	Dem./Lib.	
16th	William Rosenblatt*	Dem./Lib.	
17th	Samuel L. Greenberg*	Dem./Lib.	
18th	Harry Gittleson*	Dem./Lib.	
19th	John J. Marchi*	Republican	
20th	MacNeil Mitchell*	Republican	
21st	James Lopez Watson*	Dem./Lib.	
22nd	John P. Morrissey*	Dem./Lib.	
23rd	Joseph Zaretzki*	Dem./Lib.	Minority Leader
24th	Joseph R. Marro*	Dem./Lib.	
25th	John H. Farrell*	Dem./Lib.	
26th	Harry Kraf*	Democrat	
27th	Jacob H. Gilbert*	Democrat	on March 8, 1960, elected to the 86th U.S. Congress
28th	Nathaniel T. Helman*	Democrat	on November 8, 1960, elected to the City Court
29th	Joseph F. Periconi*	Republican	on April 14, 1960, appointed to the New York City Transit Authority
30th	Frank S. McCullough*	Republican	in 1959, appointed as County Judge of Westchester Co.
30th	Hunter Meighan*	Republican	on November 3, 1959, elected to fill vacancy
31st	George W. Cornell	Republican	
32nd	William F. Condon*	Republican	
33rd	D. Clinton Dominick III*	Republican	
34th	E. Ogden Bush*	Republican	
35th	Ernest I. Hatfield*	Republican	
36th	Julian B. Erway*	Dem./Lib.	
37th	Albert Berkowitz*	Republican	
38th	Owen M. Begley*	Dem./Lib.	
39th	Gilbert T. Seelye*	Republican	
40th	Robert C. McEwen*	Republican	
41st	Walter Van Wiggeren*	Republican	
42nd	Fred J. Rath*	Republican	
43rd	Henry A. Wise*	Republican	
44th	Lawrence M. Rulison*	Republican	
45th	John H. Hughes*	Republican	
46th	Janet Hill Gordon*	Republican	
47th	Warren M. Anderson*	Republican	
48th	George R. Metcalf*	Republican	
49th	Harold A. Jerry Jr.	Republican	
50th	Dutton Peterson*	Republican	
51st	Frank E. Van Lare*	Republican	
52nd	A. Gould Hatch*	Republican	on November 8, 1960, elected Clerk of Monroe County
53rd	Austin W. Erwin*	Republican	Chairman of Finance
54th	Earl W. Brydges*	Republican	
55th	Walter J. Mahoney*	Republican	re-elected Temporary President
56th	Frank J. Glinski	Democrat	
57th	John H. Cooke*	Republican	
58th	George H. Pierce*	Republican	Chairman of Judiciary

=== Employees ===
- Secretary: William S. King, until June 18, 1959, retired
  - John J. Sandler, acting from June 18, 1959; elected Secretary on January 6, 1960

== State Assembly ==
=== Assemblymen ===
Note: For brevity, the chairmanships omit the words "...the Committee on (the)..."

District		Assemblymen	Party	Notes
Albany	1st	Edwin Corning Jr.*	Dem./Lib.	resigned in August 1959 while in hospital after severe car accident
Albany	1st	Frank P. Cox	Democrat	on November 3, 1959, elected to fill vacancy
Albany	2nd	Harvey M. Lifset*	Dem./Lib.	
Allegany		William H. MacKenzie*	Republican	Chairman of Ways and Means
Bronx	1st	Bernard C. McDonnell*	Democrat	died on August 1, 1959
Bronx	1st	Donald J. Sullivan	Democrat	on November 3, 1959, elected to fill vacancy
Bronx	2nd	Sidney H. Asch*	Democrat	
Bronx	3rd	Moses J. Epstein*	Democrat	died on October 10, 1960
Bronx	4th	Felipe N. Torres*	Democrat	
Bronx	5th	Melville E. Abrams*	Democrat	
Bronx	6th	Ivan Warner*	Democrat	
Bronx	7th	John T. Satriale*	Democrat	
Bronx	8th	Alexander Chananau*	Democrat	
Bronx	9th	William Kapelman*	Democrat	
Bronx	10th	George W. Harrington	Republican	
Bronx	11th	Aileen B. Ryan	Dem./Lib.	
Bronx	12th	Fred W. Eggert Jr.	Dem./Lib.	
Broome	1st	Daniel S. Dickinson Jr.*	Republican	
Broome	2nd	George L. Ingalls*	Republican	
Cattaraugus		Leo P. Noonan*	Republican	
Cayuga		Charles A. Cusick*	Republican	
Chautauqua		A. Bruce Manley*	Republican	
Chemung		Harry J. Tifft*	Republican	
Chenango		Guy L. Marvin	Republican	
Clinton		Robert J. Feinberg*	Republican	
Columbia		Willard C. Drumm*	Republican	
Cortland		Louis H. Folmer*	Republican	
Delaware		Edwyn E. Mason*	Republican	
Dutchess		Robert Watson Pomeroy*	Republican	
Erie	1st	Stephen R. Greco	Dem./Lib.	
Erie	2nd	William E. Adams*	Republican	
Erie	3rd	William J. Butler*	Republican	
Erie	4th	Frank J. Caffery*	Dem./Lib.	
Erie	5th	John B. Lis*	Dem./Lib.	
Erie	6th	George F. Dannebrock*	Republican	
Erie	7th	Julius Volker*	Republican	
Erie	8th	William Sadler*	Republican	
Essex		Grant W. Johnson*	Republican	
Franklin		Robert G. Main*	Republican	on November 3, 1959, elected to the New York Supreme Court
Franklin		Hayward H. Plumadore	Republican	on January 5, 1960, elected to fill vacancy
Fulton and Hamilton		Joseph R. Younglove*	Republican	
Genesee		John E. Johnson*	Republican	
Greene		William E. Brady*	Republican	
Herkimer		Leo A. Lawrence*	Republican	
Jefferson		Orin S. Wilcox*	Republican	
Kings	1st	Max M. Turshen*	Dem./Lib.	
Kings	2nd	Samuel Bonom*	Democrat	
Kings	3rd	Harry J. Donnelly*	Republican	
Kings	4th	(Bernard Austin)*	Dem./Lib.	died on January 6, 1959
Kings	4th	Harold W. Cohn	Democrat	elected on February 17, 1959, to fill vacancy
Kings	5th	John A. Monteleone*	Dem./Lib.	resigned to run for the City Court
Kings	5th	James V. Mistretta	Democrat	on November 3, 1959, elected to fill vacancy
Kings	6th	Bertram L. Baker*	Dem./Lib.	
Kings	7th	Louis Kalish*	Dem./Lib.	
Kings	8th	Guy James Mangano	Dem./Lib.	
Kings	9th	Frank J. McMullen*	Republican	
Kings	10th	John J. Ryan*	Dem./Lib.	
Kings	11th	George A. Cincotta	Dem./Lib.	
Kings	12th	Luigi R. Marano*	Republican	
Kings	13th	Lawrence P. Murphy*	Dem./Lib.	
Kings	14th	Edward S. Lentol*	Democrat	
Kings	15th	Alfred A. Lama*	Democrat	
Kings	16th	Bernard Haber*	Democrat	died on February 26, 1959
Kings	16th	Irwin Brownstein	Democrat	on November 3, 1959, elected to fill vacancy
Kings	17th	Samuel I. Berman*	Dem./Lib.	
Kings	18th	Stanley Steingut*	Dem./Lib.	
Kings	19th	Joseph Kottler	Democrat	
Kings	20th	Joseph R. Corso*	Democrat	
Kings	21st	Bertram L. Podell*	Democrat	
Kings	22nd	Anthony J. Travia*	Democrat	Minority Leader
Lewis		Dwight N. Dudo	Republican	
Livingston		Kenneth R. Willard*	Republican	
Madison		Harold I. Tyler*	Republican	
Monroe	1st	J. Eugene Goddard*	Republican	
Monroe	2nd	John J. Conway Jr.*	Republican	
Monroe	3rd	Paul B. Hanks Jr.*	Republican	
Monroe	4th	Thomas F. Riley*	Republican	
Montgomery		Donald A. Campbell*	Republican	
Nassau	1st	Anthony Barbiero*	Republican	
Nassau	2nd	Joseph F. Carlino*	Republican	Majority Leader; on July 1, 1959, elected Speaker
Nassau	3rd	Genesta M. Strong*	Republican	resigned to run for the State Senate
Nassau	3rd	John E. Kingston	Republican	on November 3, 1959, elected to fill vacancy
Nassau	4th	Edwin J. Fehrenbach*	Republican	
Nassau	5th	Francis P. McCloskey*	Republican	
Nassau	6th	Palmer D. Farrington*	Republican	
New York	1st	William F. Passannante*	Democrat	
New York	2nd	Louis DeSalvio*	Democrat	
New York	3rd	Francis W. Doheny*	Democrat	
New York	4th	Samuel A. Spiegel*	Democrat	
New York	5th	Bentley Kassal*	Democrat	
New York	6th	Joseph J. Weiser*	Dem./Lib.	
New York	7th	Daniel M. Kelly*	Dem./Lib.	
New York	8th	Dorothy Bell Lawrence	Republican	
New York	9th	John R. Brook*	Republican	
New York	10th	Martin J. Kelly Jr.	Democrat	
New York	11th	Lloyd E. Dickens	Dem./Lib.	
New York	12th	Bessie A. Buchanan*	Dem./Lib.	
New York	13th	Orest V. Maresca*	Democrat	
New York	14th	Jose Ramos-Lopez	Democrat	
New York	15th	John J. Walsh	Democrat	
New York	16th	Frank G. Rossetti*	Democrat	
Niagara	1st	Harold H. Altro*	Republican	
Niagara	2nd	Ernest Curto*	Republican	
Oneida	1st	David R. Townsend*	Republican	
Oneida	2nd	William S. Calli*	Republican	
Onondaga	1st	Don H. Brown	Republican	
Onondaga	2nd	Charles A. Schoeneck Jr.*	Republican	Majority Leader from July 1, 1959
Onondaga	3rd	Philip R. Chase*	Republican	
Ontario		Robert M. Quigley*	Republican	
Orange	1st	Daniel Becker	Republican	
Orange	2nd	Wilson C. Van Duzer*	Republican	
Orleans		Alonzo L. Waters*	Republican	
Oswego		Edward F. Crawford*	Republican	
Otsego		Paul L. Talbot*	Republican	
Putnam		Willis H. Stephens*	Republican	
Queens	1st	Thomas V. LaFauci*	Democrat	
Queens	2nd	William C. Brennan*	Democrat	
Queens	3rd	Charles T. Eckstein*	Republican	
Queens	4th	Jules G. Sabbatino	Democrat	
Queens	5th	William G. Giaccio*	Democrat	
Queens	6th	Michael G. Rice*	Democrat	
Queens	7th	Moses M. Weinstein	Democrat	
Queens	8th	John DiLeonardo*	Republican	
Queens	9th	Fred W. Preller*	Republican	
Queens	10th	Louis Wallach*	Democrat	
Queens	11th	Alfred D. Lerner*	Republican	
Queens	12th	J. Lewis Fox*	Democrat	
Queens	13th	Anthony P. Savarese Jr.*	Republican	
Rensselaer		Thomas H. Brown*	Republican	on April 15, 1959, appointed as a Deputy Motor Vehicles Commissioner
Rensselaer		Douglas Hudson	Republican	on November 3, 1959, elected to fill vacancy
Richmond	1st	Edward J. Amann Jr.*	Republican	
Richmond	2nd	Lucio F. Russo*	Republican	
Rockland		Robert Walmsley*	Republican	
St. Lawrence		Verner M. Ingram*	Republican	
Saratoga		John L. Ostrander*	Republican	
Schenectady		Oswald D. Heck*	Republican	re-elected Speaker; died on May 21, 1959
Schenectady		Joseph F. Egan	Republican	on November 3, 1959, elected to fill vacancy
Schoharie		Russell Selkirk	Republican	
Schuyler		Jerry W. Black*	Republican	
Seneca		Francis J. Souhan	Democrat	
Steuben		Charles D. Henderson*	Republican	
Suffolk	1st	Irving L. Price Jr.*	Republican	
Suffolk	2nd	Prescott B. Huntington*	Republican	
Suffolk	3rd	James R. Grover Jr.*	Republican	
Sullivan		Hyman E. Mintz*	Republican	
Tioga		Richard C. Lounsberry*	Republican	
Tompkins		Ray S. Ashbery*	Republican	
Ulster		Kenneth L. Wilson*	Republican	
Warren		Richard J. Bartlett	Republican	
Washington		William J. Reid*	Republican	
Wayne		Mildred F. Taylor*	Republican	
Westchester	1st	Christian H. Armbruster	Republican	
Westchester	2nd	P. Boice Esser	Republican	
Westchester	3rd	Frances K. Marlatt*	Republican	
Westchester	4th	Hunter Meighan*	Republican	resigned to run for the State Senate
Westchester	4th	Anthony B. Gioffre	Republican	on November 3, 1959, elected to fill vacancy
Westchester	5th	Robert J. Trainor	Republican	on September 29, 1960, appointed as D.A. of Westchester Co.
Westchester	6th	Theodore Hill Jr.*	Republican	
Wyoming		Harold L. Peet*	Republican	
Yates		Paul R. Taylor	Republican	previously a member from Monroe County

=== Employees ===
- Clerk: Ansley B. Borkowski
- Sergeant-at-Arms: Raymond J. Roche
- Deputy Journal Clerk: Maude E. Ten Eyck

== Sources ==
- FULL LIST OF LEGISLATORS in the Civil Service Leader (Vol. XXI, No. 23, February 16, 1960; pg. 14)
- Members of the New York Senate (1950s) at Political Graveyard
- Members of the New York Assembly (1950s) at Political Graveyard
- Members of the New York Senate (1960s) at Political Graveyard
- Members of the New York Assembly (1960s) at Political Graveyard
