= Senator Rath =

Senator Rath may refer to:

- Fred J. Rath (1888–1968), New York State Senate
- Mary Lou Rath (born 1934), New York State Senate
