= Senator Cornell =

Senator Cornell may refer to:

- Charles G. Cornell (1827–1906), New York State Senate
- Ezra Cornell (1807–1874), New York State Senate
- Francis R. E. Cornell (1821–1881), New York State Senate
- George W. Cornell (1896–1988), New York State Senate
