= Kenneth R. Willard =

American businessman and politician

Kenneth R. Willard (November 13, 1902 – January 26, 1987) was an American businessman and politician from New York.

== Life ==
He was born on November 13, 1902, in Nunda, Livingston County, New York. He attended Nunda High School, The Manlius School, Rochester Business Institute, Eastman School of Music and Columbia College. He was Secretary and Treasurer of the Nunda Casket Company. He also entered politics as a Republican. He married Helen Gillette (1909–1986), and they had three children.

Willard was Mayor of Nunda for 24 years; a member of the New York State Assembly (Livingston Co.) from 1957 to 1964, sitting in the 171st, 172nd, 173rd and 174th New York State Legislatures; a member of the New York State Senate in 1965 and 1966; and a delegate to the New York State Constitutional Convention of 1967.

He died on January 26, 1987; and was buried at the Oakwood Cemetery in Nunda.

== Sources ==
New York State Assembly
Preceded by Joseph W. Ward	New York State Assembly; Livingston County; 1957–1964	Succeeded by James L. Emery
New York State Senate
Preceded by Barber B. Conable, Jr.	New York State Senate; 53rd District; 1965	Succeeded by John H. Hughes
Preceded by new district	New York State Senate; 59th District; 1966	Succeeded by district abolished
