= Melville E. Abrams =

American lawyer and politician

Melville E. Abrams (February 14, 1912 – October 10, 1966) was an American lawyer and politician from New York.

== Life ==
He was born on February 14, 1912, in New York City. He attended Junior High School No. 61 and Townsend Harris Hall High School. He graduated from the College of the City of New York and New York Law School. He practiced law in New York City, and entered politics as a Democrat. He married Anne Soffrin, and they had one son: Mark David Abrams (born 1950).

Abrams was a member of the New York State Assembly from 1955 until his death in 1966, sitting in the 170th, 171st, 172nd, 173rd, 174th, 175th and 176th New York State Legislatures. He was Chairman of the Committee on Social Welfare in 1965 and 1966.

He died on October 10, 1966, at his home at 1160 Evergreen Avenue in the Bronx, of a heart attack.

== Sources ==
New York State Assembly
Preceded by Felipe N. Torres	New York State Assembly; Bronx County, 5th District; 1955–1965	Succeeded by district abolished
Preceded by new district	New York State Assembly; 90th District; 1966	Succeeded by Gordon W. Burrows
