= Dorothy Bell Lawrence =

American politician

Dorothy Bell Lawrence (September 14, 1911 – May 1973) was an American politician from New York.

== Life ==
She was born Dorothy Fleming Bell on September 14, 1911, in Augusta, Georgia, the daughter of Harry Rushton Bell. She graduated from Augusta Training School for Teachers and then taught school in Augusta. She married Stillson Freeman Lawrence (died 1957), and they had one son.

She entered politics as a Republican. From 1941 to 1943, she was Congressional Secretary to Congressman William T. Pheiffer. She was an alternate delegate to the 1952, 1956 and 1960 Republican National Conventions.

Dorothy Bell Lawrence was a member of the New York State Assembly (New York Co., 8th D.) from 1959 to 1963, sitting in the 172nd, 173rd and 174th New York State Legislatures. In November 1961, she ran for Borough President of Manhattan but was defeated by the Democratic incumbent Edward R. Dudley. On May 2, 1963, she was appointed to the New York State Unemployment Insurance Appeal Board. In 1966, she was appointed to the New York State Commission for Human Rights.

As of 1960, she lived at Sutton House.

She died in May 1973.

== Sources ==
New York State Assembly
Preceded by Archibald Douglas, Jr.	New York State Assembly; New York County, 8th District; 1959–1963	Succeeded by John M. Burns
