= William E. Adams (New York politician) =

American politician

William E. Adams (December 25, 1922 – April 1983) was an American lawyer and politician from New York.

== Life ==
He was born on December 25, 1922, in Knightstown, Henry County, Indiana. He attended Knightstown High School, and took a pre-law course at Indiana University Bloomington. He graduated LL.B from the University of Buffalo Law School. He practiced law in Buffalo, New York, and lived in Kenmore. He married Jacquela Devlin (1926–2005), and they had four children.

Adams was a member of the New York State Assembly (Erie Co., 2nd D.) from 1957 to 1964, sitting in the 171st, 172nd, 173rd and 174th New York State Legislatures. In November 1964, he ran for re-election, but was defeated by Democrat F. James Kane, Jr.

Adams was a member of the New York State Senate from 1966 to 1970, sitting in the 176th, 177th and 178th New York State Legislatures. On December 12, 1969, he was indicted by a federal grand jury for perjury because he had denied under oath that he received a bribe of $5,000. His trial began on March 30, 1971, and he was acquitted on March 7. In November 1970, Adams ran for re-election, but was defeated by Democrat John J. LaFalce. On December 29, 1970, Adams was appointed as General Counsel to the New York State Board of Standards and Appeals. In 1971, he moved to Albany.

He died in April 1983.

== General reference ==
- William E. Adams Papers, 1966–1970. M.E. Grenander Department of Special Collections and Archives, University Libraries, University at Albany, State University of New York (hereafter referred to as the Adams Papers).

== Sources ==
New York State Assembly
Preceded by Justin C. Morgan	New York State Assembly; Erie County, 2nd District; 1957–1964	Succeeded by F. James Kane, Jr.
New York State Senate
Preceded by new district	New York State Senate; 61st District; 1966	Succeeded by district abolished
Preceded by John H. Hughes	New York State Senate; 53rd District; 1967–1970	Succeeded by John J. LaFalce
