= Peter J. McQuillan =

American judge and jurist (1929–2019)

Justice - New York State Supreme Court
- In office 1972-1992

Counsel - NYS Temporary Commission on Revision of the Penal Law
- In office 1961-1968

Assistant D.A. - New York county
- In office 1954-1959

Personal details
- Born: February 26, 1929
- Died: September 19, 2019 (aged 90)
- Education: Long Island University, Fordham University School of Law, New York Law School

Peter J. McQuillan (February 26, 1929 – September 19, 2019) was an American judge and jurist. In legal circles, McQuillan was most noted for his work and expertise in the complete revision of the New York State penal code in the 1960s, the first major overhaul of that law since the 1800s.

Following the revised penal code's enactment in 1971, McQuillan then served 21 years as a judge in New York, before retiring from the New York State Supreme Court in 1992.

Among his many cases in the news, he ruled against jury exclusions based on gender; against prosecutorial withholding of evidence in the case of Dhoruba al-Mujahid bin Wahad; against illegal search and seizure in the case of playwright Miguel Pinero; and against unwarranted government surveillance. He also co-wrote an independent review of flaws in the criminal case mounted against Jeffrey Deskovic, an upstate New York man who spent half his life in prison for a rape and murder he did not commit.

== Early career ==
In the 1950s, McQuillan served as an assistant district attorney in New York County under Frank Hogan. He was also an assistant counsel for the state Commission of Investigation, which examined the 1957 gathering known as the Apalachin Meeting. The Apalachin Meeting was considered a landmark case in the history of organized crime.

In 1961, McQuillan became special counsel to the New York State Temporary Commission on Revision of the Penal Law, which oversaw the rewriting of New York State's penal and criminal procedure law. This was the first major revision of the law in over 80 years. Prior to the revision, the code was a piecemeal collection of local and statewide laws, with language and provisions going back to the 1800s.

The commission was chaired by state assemblyman Richard J. Bartlett. McQuillan and Richard G. Denzer were the lead counsels to the commission. The commission was tasked by Governor Nelson Rockefeller with modernizing the entire criminal procedure law, ensuring consistency and fairness in sentencing guidelines, and eliminating the many archaic provisions of the existing law that went back to the previous century.

Their revised penal law took effect on September 1, 1967. That same year, McQuillan co-authored a defining book on the revisions. Practice Commentary to Penal Law by McQuillan and Denzer provided historical references and case law for all of the code's revised statutes. After McQuillan left to become director of the State Office of Crime Control, there were additional revisions to the code and the final draft took effect as law on September 1, 1971.

== Notable Court Cases ==
McQuillan was appointed to the New York Criminal Court in 1971 by Mayor John Lindsay. He was named a justice of the New York State Supreme Court the following year, 1972. In 1985, McQuillan was also named administrative judge of the criminal branch of the State Supreme Court, a position he held until his retirement.

Both during and after his time on the bench, McQuillan presided over or was involved with a number of publicized trials.

In the case of Dhoruba al-Mujahid bin Wahad (formerly Richard Moore) McQuillan reversed Wahad's conviction for attempted murder, after Wahad had served 19 years in prison. In 1990, McQuillan ruled that the prosecution had failed to disclose evidence which would have helped Wahad's defense. McQuillan based his ruling on a 1986 New York State Court of Appeals decision calling for a reversal of a conviction whenever the prosecution withholds evidence. McQuillan ordered that Wahad be freed and released without bail, pending a new trial. An attempt to appeal this ruling was rejected by the Appellate Division of the New York Supreme Court, and in 1995, the Manhattan district attorney's office said it would not retry Wahad.

In the case of Jeffrey Deskovic, McQuillan co-wrote the independent review which found that a series of investigative and prosecutorial missteps led to Deskovic's wrongful conviction. The review was commissioned by the newly elected Westchester County district attorney Janet DiFiore and was written by McQuillan along with Leslie Crocker Snyder, William L. Murphy; and Richard Joselson. The 2007 report found that throughout the case against Deskovic, errors were made that propelled the case to an "unjust" outcome, including police and prosecutorial "tunnel vision," overreliance on profiling, and a what the report called a deliberate attempt to play down the DNA evidence that ultimately led to Deskovic's exoneration.

Following the U.S. Supreme Court's ruling on the death penalty in 1976 (Gregg v. Georgia), McQuillan was also the first to declare that New York's death penalty was unconstitutional, and to give specific reasons for it. He ruled that the law was unconstitutional according to the Supreme Court's ruling, because it did not give a judge or a jury leeway to exercise discretion in deciding an appropriate sentence for a particular case, and did not provide for two separate trials—one for determination of guilt and another for determination of sentence. McQuillan's ruling was not binding on other Supreme Court justices, but was considered significant by the New York Times because of its detail and the fact that McQuillan was considered to be "one of the leading authorities" on the state's criminal law.

In the case of playwright Miguel Pinero, McQuillan ruled that there was no justifiable cause for the arrest of Pinero and two other men on the 1978 charges of armed robbery, and that all evidence taken in the arrest resulted from an illegal search and seizure, and was therefore inadmissible in court.

McQuillan also became an advocate for non-discriminatory jury selection. In a 1972 legal ruling, he urged the state legislature and governor to change laws that provided for automatic exemptions for women from jury duty. At the time, New York was one of seven states in which women were included on juries only if they volunteered.

In May 1984, McQuillan ruled that Marble Hill, Manhattan was simultaneously part of the Borough of Manhattan (not the Borough of the Bronx) and part of Bronx County (not New York County) a matter that was definitively settled later that year when the New York Legislature passed legislation declaring the neighborhood part of New York County and the Borough of Manhattan.

Prior to his appointment as a judge, McQuillan was director of the New York State Office of Crime Control Planning. He also was a member of the Criminal Jury Instructions Committee and served on a task force formed by NY Governor Hugh Carey to study ways to increase state funding for local police departments.

From 1976 to 1992, McQuillan served as an adjunct professor at Fordham University School of Law, the school from which he had received his law degree. In 1993, he received the New York State Bar Association's Vincent E. Doyle Jr. Award for Outstanding Judicial Contribution in the Criminal Justice System. Throughout his career, McQuillan also wrote opinion pieces for multiple publications including the New York State Bar Association Journal, the Fordham University Law Journal, and the New York Times.

== Retirement ==
In retirement, McQuillan stayed active in criminal law. In addition to the review of the Deskovic case, he compiled a newsletter for the Innocence Project, focusing on DNA exonerations in criminal court cases around the world. He was also a member the New York State Commission on Forensic Science and a consultant on DNA and public access to DNA databanks.

== Personal life ==
McQuillan was born and raised in Manhattan. After serving in the army and graduating college, he received his law degrees from Fordham University School of Law and New York Law School. In 1953, McQuillan met his first wife Dorothy when friends set them up on a blind date. They were married for 28 years and had one daughter, Veronica. McQuillan officiated as the judge for his daughter's wedding, held at Windows On The World at the original World Trade Center. After Dorothy died in 1981, McQuillan married attorney Carol Halprin. The couple divided their time between homes in upstate New York and Florida until his death at his N.Y. home in September 2019.
