= William H. MacKenzie =

American politician

William Hector MacKenzie (December 10, 1890 – November 2, 1972) was an American politician from New York.

== Life ==
He was born on December 10, 1890, in Mount Healthy, Hamilton County, Ohio. In 1913, he moved to Wellsville, Allegany County, New York, and began a career in the insurance business. During World War I he served in the U.S. Navy. He married Helene Paul (1897–1952), and they had three children. Later he moved to Belmont, the county seat.

MacKenzie was a member of the New York State Assembly (Allegany Co.) from 1936 to 1960, sitting in the 159th, 160th, 161st, 162nd, 163rd, 164th, 165th, 166th, 167th, 168th, 169th, 170th, 171st and 172nd New York State Legislatures. He served as chairman of the committee on Ways and Means from 1953 to 1960.

He was an alternate delegate to the 1948 Republican National Convention.

In 1968, he gave his estate in Belmont to Alfred University, and went to live with his daughter's family in San Diego, California.

He died on November 2, 1972; and was buried at the Forest Hills Cemetery in Belmont.

Alfred University awards a "William H. MacKenzie Memorial Endowed Scholarship".

== Sources ==
New York State Assembly
Preceded by Harry E. Goodrich	New York State Assembly; Alleghany County; 1936–1960	Succeeded by Don O. Cummings
Preceded by D. Mallory Stephens	New York State Assembly; Chairman of the Committee on Ways and Means; 1953–1960	Succeeded by Fred W. Preller
