= Anthony B. Gioffre =

New York politician

Anthony Bruno Gioffre (1907 – 1996) was an American lawyer and politician from New York.

== Life ==
He was born in 1907 in Port Chester, Westchester County, New York. He attended Port Chester High School. He graduated B.Sc. from Syracuse University in 1929, and LL.B. from Brooklyn Law School. He was admitted to the bar in 1937. He practiced law in Port Chester. He married Louise M. Giorno, and they had four children.

Gioffre entered politics as a Republican, and was Mayor of Port Chester from 1954 to 1956.

He was a member of the New York State Assembly (Westchester Co., 4th D.) from 1960 to 1965, sitting in the 172nd, 173rd, 174th and 175th New York State Legislatures.

He was a member of the New York State Senate from 1966 to 1972, sitting in the 176th, 177th, 178th and 179th New York State Legislatures.

He died in 1996.

== Sources ==
New York State Assembly
Preceded by Hunter Meighan	New York State Assembly; Westchester County, 4th District; 1960–1965	Succeeded by district abolished
New York State Senate
Preceded by Nathan Proller	New York State Senate; 39th District; 1966	Succeeded by Douglas Hudson
Preceded by Dennis R. Coleman	New York State Senate; 35th District; 1967–1972	Succeeded by John E. Flynn
