= Hunter Meighan =

American lawyer and politician

Hunter Meighan (May 8, 1914 – June 6, 2008) was an American lawyer and politician from New York.

== Life ==
He was born on May 8, 1914, in Mamaroneck, Westchester County, New York, the son of Burton C. Meighan and Effie (Hunter) Meighan. He graduated from Columbia College in 1935, and from New York University School of Law in 1939. Then he practiced law in partnership with his father. He was Acting Police Judge of the Village of Mamaroneck from 1945 to 1949. On April 7, 1951, he married Miriam Gay, and they had three daughters, among them Marcia Meighan who married Greg B. Abbott (born 1950).

Meighan was a member of the New York State Assembly (Westchester Co., 4th D.) from 1951 to 1958, sitting in the 168th, 169th, 170th, 171st and 172nd New York State Legislatures. In 1959, he resigned his seat to run for the State Senate seat vacated by Frank S. McCullough.

Meighan was a member of the New York State Senate from 1960 to 1964, sitting in the 172nd, 173rd and 174th New York State Legislatures. In November 1964, he ran for re-election, but was defeated by Democrat Max Berking.

He was a delegate to the New York State Constitutional Convention of 1967.

Meighan died on June 6, 2008, in Mamaroneck.

== Sources ==
New York State Assembly
Preceded by Frank S. McCullough	New York State Assembly; Westchester County, 4th District; 1951–1959	Succeeded by Anthony B. Gioffre
New York State Senate
Preceded by Frank S. McCullough	New York State Senate; 30th District; 1960–1964	Succeeded by Max Berking
