= Frank E. Van Lare =

American businessman and politician

Frank Edward Van Lare (February 22, 1900 – December 23, 1971) was an American businessman and politician from New York.

== Life ==
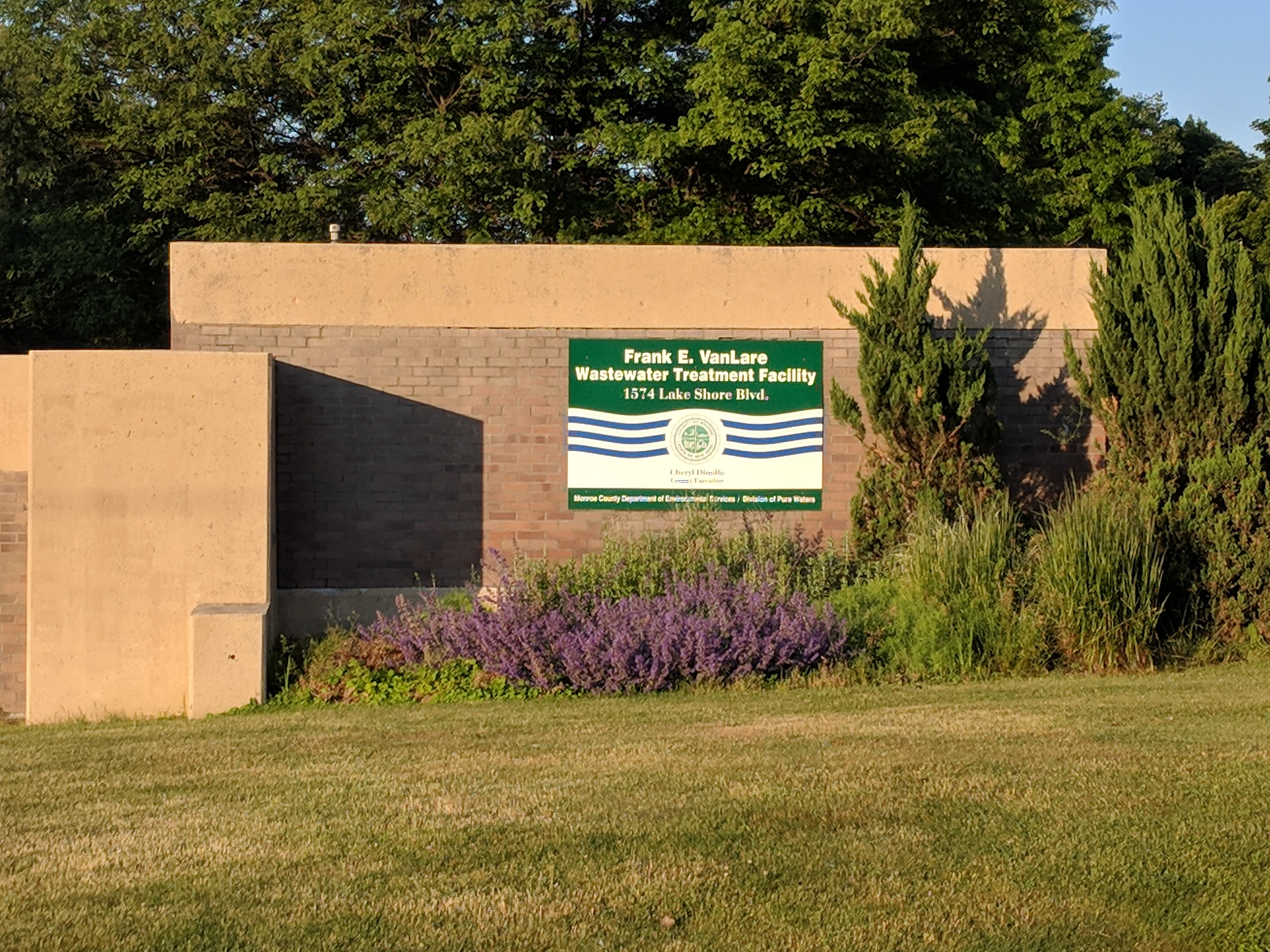
The Frank E. Van Lare wastewater treatment plant in Rochester, New York.

He was born on February 22, 1900, in an area of the Town of Gates which later was annexed by the City of Rochester, in Monroe County, New York. He was the son of Isaac Van Lare (1857–1928) and Jozina (Butler) Van Lare (1862–1933). He attended the public schools. Then he engaged in the fuel business. He married Dorothy R. Harward (1900–1965), and their son was Donald F. Van Lare (1936–2013). He entered politics as a Republican.

Van Lare was a member of the New York State Senate from 1951 to 1966, sitting in the 168th, 169th, 170th, 171st, 172nd, 173rd, 174th, 175th and 176th New York State Legislatures.

He died on December 23, 1971, in Rochester, New York; and was buried at the White Haven Memorial Park in Pittsford.

== Sources ==
New York State Senate
Preceded by John H. Cooke	New York State Senate; 51st District; 1951–1965	Succeeded by James H. Donovan
Preceded by Jeremiah J. Moriarty	New York State Senate; 58th District; 1966	Succeeded by district abolished
