= Moses M. Weinstein =

American politician

Majority Leader of the New York State Assembly
- In office January 1, 1965 – December 31, 1968
- Preceded by: George L. Ingalls
- Succeeded by: John E. Kingston

Member of the New York State Assembly
- In office January 1, 1959 – November 1969
- Preceded by: Bernard Dubin
- Succeeded by: Emanuel R. Gold
- Constituency: Queens's 7th district (1959-1965); 24th district (1966); 25th district (1967-1969)

Personal details
- Born: July 8, 1912 New York City, New York, U.S.
- Died: November 30, 2007 (aged 95) Pembroke Pines, Florida, U.S.
- Spouse: Muriel Marshall
- Children: Peter Weinstein, Jeremy Weinstein, Jonathan Weinstein

Moses M. Weinstein (July 8, 1912 – November 30, 2007) was an American lawyer and politician.

== Name ==
He was born Morris Weinstein without a middle initial. A playbill for a production at Brooklyn College added erroneously the middle initial, and a mistaken inscription of his degree at Brooklyn Law School changed Morris to Moses which name he adopted henceforth.

== Life ==
He was born on July 8, 1912, in New York City, the son of a tailor, and grew up on the Lower East Side, Manhattan. He graduated from Thomas Jefferson High School at 15, but it took him seven years and a dozen jobs to work his way through college and law school.

In 1941, he married Muriel Marshall (d. 2006). They had three sons who all graduated from Brooklyn Law School too: Jeremy Weinstein, a New York Supreme Court justice and State Senator; Jonathan Weinstein; and Peter Weinstein, a Circuit Court judge in Broward County, Fla.

In World War II, he was an infantry corporal and fought in the Battle of the Bulge.

He was a member of the New York State Assembly from 1959 to 1969, sitting in the 172nd, 173rd, 174th, 175th, 176th, 177th and 178th New York State Legislatures. He was Majority Leader from 1965 to 1968, and as such became Acting Speaker for the remainder of the year upon the resignation of Speaker Anthony J. Travia after the close of the legislative session in 1968.

He was Chairman of the Queens Democratic Party from 1962 to 1969, and was Majority Leader of the New York State Constitutional Convention of 1967.

In August 1968, Weinstein, who as Acting Speaker was fourth in line for the governorship, became Acting Governor of New York for 10 days when Governor Nelson Rockefeller, Lieutenant Governor Malcolm Wilson and Temporary President of the Senate Earl W. Brydges went to the 1968 Republican National Convention in Miami Beach, Florida.

Weinstein was an ally of Mayor of New York Robert F. Wagner in the early 1960s and had a good relationship with Governor Rockefeller. Weinstein sponsored measures that created the Urban Development Corporation and the Crime Victims Compensation Board, reformed divorce and welfare laws, established a consumer bill of rights, increased aid for air-pollution controls and Regents scholarships, and promoted hospital expansion. He supported rent controls, veterans rights, aid to small businesses and antidiscrimination laws.

In November 1969, he was elected to the New York Supreme Court. In a 1973 case, acknowledging he might be violating the law, he vacated the three-year term of a woman convicted of selling drugs, noting that she had terminal cancer and less than a year to live.

In 1980, he was appointed to the New York Supreme Court, Appellate Division, Second Department, with jurisdiction over Queens, Brooklyn, Staten Island and seven suburban counties. He participated in rulings that threw out unjust convictions, invalidated school financing based on property taxes and decided many other controversies. He left the bench at the end of 1988 after reaching the constitutional age limit.

He died on November 30, 2007, in Memorial Hospital in Pembroke Pines, Broward County, Florida.

== Sources ==
- Obit in NYT on December 3, 2007, with photo
- "Mourning notice by Brooklyn Law School". The New York Times. December 4, 2007.

New York State Assembly
Preceded by Bernard Dubin	New York State Assembly; Queens County, 7th District; 1959–1965	Succeeded by district abolished
Preceded by new district	New York State Assembly; 24th District; 1966	Succeeded by Seymour Boyers
Preceded by Frederick D. Schmidt	New York State Assembly; 25th District; 1967–1969	Succeeded by Emanuel R. Gold
Political offices
Preceded by George L. Ingalls	Majority Leader of the New York State Assembly; 1965–1968	Succeeded by John E. Kingston
Preceded by Anthony J. Travia	Speaker of the New York State Assembly; Acting; 1968	Succeeded by Perry B. Duryea, Jr.
