= D. Clinton Dominick III =

American politician

DeWitt Clinton Dominick (June 4, 1918 – September 9, 2009) was an American lawyer and politician from New York.

== Life ==
He was born on June 4, 1918, in Newburgh, Orange County, New York, the son of D. Clinton Dominick (1889–1967) and Blanche H. Dominick (1890–1976). He attended the public schools and Newburgh Free Academy. He graduated from Virginia Military Institute. During World War II he served in the U.S. Army, and attained the rank of colonel. In 1944, he married Nancy Ragan (1922–1978), and they had five children. He graduated from Columbia Law School in 1948, was admitted to the bar, and practiced law in Newburgh.

Dominick was a member of the New York State Assembly (Orange Co., 1st D.) from 1955 to 1958, sitting in the 170th and 171st New York State Legislatures.

He was a member of the New York State Senate from 1959 to 1970, sitting in the 172nd, 173rd, 174th, 175th, 176th, 177th and 178th New York State Legislatures. He was a delegate to the New York State Constitutional Convention of 1967. In 1970, he co-sponsored the bill which legalized in the State of New York unrestricted abortion until 24 weeks of pregnancy. In June 1970, he ran for re-nomination, but was defeated in the Republican primary by Conservative Republican Richard E. Schermerhorn.

Dominick died on September 9, 2009, in Ponte Vedra Beach, St. Johns County, Florida; and was cremated.

Assemblyman DeWitt C. Dominick was his grandfather.

== Sources ==
New York State Assembly
Preceded by Lee B. Mailler	New York State Assembly; Orange County, 1st District; 1955–1958	Succeeded by Daniel Becker
New York State Senate
Preceded by Thomas C. Desmond	New York State Senate; 33rd District; 1959–1965	Succeeded by Jerome Schutzer
Preceded by William S. Calli	New York State Senate; 42nd District; 1966	Succeeded by Ronald B. Stafford
Preceded by Archie A. Gorfinkel	New York State Senate; 37th District; 1967–1970	Succeeded by Richard E. Schermerhorn
