= William S. Calli =

American politician (1923–2012)

William S. Calli (December 27, 1923 – September 17, 2012) was an American lawyer and politician from New York.

== Life ==
He was born on December 27, 1923, in Utica, Oneida County, New York, the son of Rocco R. Calli and Elsie (Heibel) Calli. He attended Utica Free Academy. During World War II he served in the U.S. Army Air Force. He graduated from Dartmouth College, and J.D. from Albany Law School in 1949. He practiced law in Utica, and entered politics as a Republican. On May 29, 1954, he married Ann Dunn (died 1993), and they had two sons.

Calli was a member of the New York State Assembly (Oneida Co., 2nd D.) from 1951 to 1964, sitting in the 168th, 169th, 170th, 171st, 172nd, 173rd and 174th New York State Legislatures; and a member of the New York State Senate (42nd D.) in 1965.

He was Oneida County Attorney from 1980 to 1993.

On September 17, 2012, he lost control of his car, and collided with another vehicle on New York State Route 28 a few miles south of Old Forge in the Adirondacks. He was taken to SUNY Upstate Medical University in Syracuse, but died soon after arriving there; and was buried at the Calvary Cemetery in Utica.

== Sources ==
New York State Assembly
Preceded by Jeremiah J. Ashcroft	New York State Assembly; Oneida County, 2nd D. 1951–1964	Succeeded by John B. Cosgrove
New York State Senate
Preceded by Fred J. Rath	New York State Senate; 42nd District; 1965	Succeeded by D. Clinton Dominick III
