= Joseph R. Marro =

American lawyer and politician

Joseph R. Marro (March 17, 1907 – February 21, 1989) was an American lawyer and politician from New York.

== Life ==
He was born on March 17, 1907, in New York City. He attended Public School No. 95 and No. 8, and DeWitt Clinton High School. He graduated from St. John's College, and from St. John's University School of Law. He practiced law in New York City. He married Anita Eleanor Aloi, and they had two children.

Marro was a member of the New York State Senate from 1953 to 1964, sitting in the 169th, 170th, 171st, 172nd, 173rd and 174th New York State Legislatures. In November 1964, he was elected to the New York City Civil Court.

He was a justice of the Civil Court from 1965 to 1973; and of the New York Supreme Court from 1974 to 1977.

He died on February 21, 1989, at his home in Manhattan, of heart failure.

== Sources ==
New York State Senate
| Preceded by Elmer F. Quinn | New York State Senate; 18th District; 1953–1954 | Succeeded by Harry Gittleson |
| Preceded by John J. Donovan, Jr. | New York State Senate; 24th District; 1955–1964 | Succeeded by Paul P. E. Bookson |
