= Angelo F. Orazio =

American politician (1926–2018)

Member of the New York State Assembly from the 15th district
- In office January 1, 1975 – December 31, 1984
- Preceded by: John E. Kingston
- Succeeded by: Dan Frisa

Personal details
- Born: June 19, 1926 Cosenza, Italy
- Died: January 22, 2018 (aged 91) Albertson, New York, U.S.
- Party: Democratic

Angelo F. Orazio (June 19, 1926 – January 22, 2018) was a Democratic American politician who served in the New York State Assembly from the 15th district from 1975 to 1984. He was elected by defeating the Assembly's Majority Leader, John E. Kingston in 1974, a year when the fallout from Watergate brought down many Republicans nationwide. He was defeated by Dan Frisa after 10 years in the legislature.

Orazio was born June 19, 1926, in Cosenza, Calabria, Italy.

He lost a race for the State Senate to Michael J. Tully Jr. in 1986.

He died on January 22, 2018, in Albertson, New York at age 91.
