= John E. Kingston =

American politician

Majority Leader of the New York State Assembly
- In office January 1, 1969 – December 31, 1974
- Preceded by: Moses M. Weinstein
- Succeeded by: Albert H. Blumenthal

Member of the New York State Assembly
- In office January 1, 1960 – December 31, 1974
- Preceded by: Genesta M. Strong
- Succeeded by: Angelo F. Orazio
- Constituency: Nassau's 3rd district (1960-1965); 16th district (1966); 17th district (1967-1972); 15th district (1973-1974)

Personal details
- Born: December 11, 1925 Niagara Falls, New York
- Died: May 5, 1996 (aged 70)
- Party: Republican

John E. Kingston (December 11, 1925 – May 5, 1996) was an American lawyer and politician from New York.

== Life ==
He was born on December 11, 1925, in Niagara Falls, New York. The family moved to Nassau County in 1929. He attended Mount Hermon School, and graduated A.B. from Williams College in 1948. He graduated from New York University School of Law in 1950, was admitted to the bar, and practiced law in Mineola.

Kingston was a member of the New York State Assembly from 1960 to 1974, after winning a special election in 1959. He sat in the 172nd, 173rd, 174th, 175th, 176th, 177th, 178th, 179th and 180th New York State Legislatures. He was Majority Leader from 1969 to 1974, and almost 50 years later remains the last Republican Majority Leader of the Assembly.

As chairman of the 1972 Republican Assembly Campaign Committee, Kingston was indicted on December 13, 1973, for violation of Section 457 of State Election Law, along with Perry Duryea, the Speaker of the Assembly. The committee had distributed letters that urged support for the Assembly candidate for the Liberal Party of New York where the Democrat had not been cross-endorsed by the Liberals, when they were actually generated by the Republican Party. The Committee argued that this was legal under the First Amendment of the United States. The indictment was ultimately dismissed on January 24, 1974, on grounds of "overbreadth" of Section 457 citing Dombrowski v. Pfister, Broadrick v. Oklahoma, Plummer v. City of Columbus, and Lovell v. City of Griffin. The lower court dismissal of the indictment was upheld on appeal.

He was a Judge of the Nassau County District Court through 1994, after first being elected in 1989, representing North Hempstead. In November 1994, he was elected to the New York Supreme Court, thereby having won elections in five different decades. He remained on the bench until retiring shortly before his death.

He died on May 5, 1996; and was buried at the Nassau Knolls Cemetery in Port Washington.

New York State Assembly
Preceded by Genesta M. Strong	New York State Assembly; Nassau County, 3rd District; 1960–1965	Succeeded by district abolished
Preceded by new district	New York State Assembly; 16th District; 1966	Succeeded by George J. Farrell Jr.
Preceded by Abe Seldin	New York State Assembly; 17th District; 1967–1972	Succeeded by Joseph M. Margiotta
Preceded by Eli Wager	New York State Assembly; 15th District; 1973–1974	Succeeded by Angelo F. Orazio
Political offices
Preceded by Moses M. Weinstein	Majority Leader of the New York State Assembly; 1969–1974	Succeeded by Albert H. Blumenthal
