= Burton M. Fine =

American lawyer and politician (1932–2022)

Burton M. Fine (February 4, 1932 – January 18, 2022) was an American politician and lawyer.

Fine was born in New York City, New York, the son of Judge Sidney A. Fine. He graduated from the Bronx High School of Science and served in the United States Army from 1954 to 1956. He received his bachelor's degree from Cornell University and his law degree from Columbia Law School. He practiced law in New York City and worked in the United States Attorney office for the Southern District of New York. From 1961 to 1965, Fine served in the New York State Assembly and was involved with the Democratic Party.
