= John P. Morrissey (politician) =

American politician (1885–1966)

John Paul Morrissey (April 29, 1885 – October 29, 1966) was an American electrical engineer and politician from New York.

== Life ==
He was born on April 29, 1885, in New York City. He attended Public School No. 77, and Teachers College. He was President of the John P. Morrissey Electric Company Inc.

He entered politics as a Democrat. He was a delegate to the 1940 Democratic National Convention, and an alternate delegate to the 1944 Democratic National Convention.

Morrissey was elected on March 10, 1942, to the New York State Assembly, to fill the vacancy caused by the resignation of Robert F. Wagner, Jr. He was re-elected three times and remained in the Assembly until 1948, sitting in the 163rd, 164th, 165th and 166th New York State Legislatures. In November 1948, he ran for Congress in the 18th District but was defeated by American Laborite Vito Marcantonio.

Morrissey was a member of the New York State Senate (22nd D.) from 1957 to 1962, sitting in the 171st, 172nd and 173rd New York State Legislature.

He died on October 29, 1966, at his home at 20 East End Avenue in Yorkville, Manhattan.

== Sources ==
New York State Assembly
Preceded by Robert F. Wagner, Jr.	New York State Senate; New York County, 16th District; 1942–1944	Succeeded by Hamlet O. Catenaccio
Preceded by MacNeil Mitchell	New York State Senate; New York County, 10th District; 1942–1948	Succeeded by Herman Katz
New York State Senate
Preceded by Alfred E. Santangelo	New York State Senate; 22nd District; 1957–1962	Succeeded by Jerome L. Wilson
