= Henry M. Curran =

American politician

Member of the New York State Senate
- In office January 1, 1961 – December 31, 1968
- Preceded by: Genesta M. Strong
- Succeeded by: Ralph J. Marino
- Constituency: 3rd district (1961-1965); 4th district (1966); 3rd district (1967-1968)

Personal details
- Born: January 2, 1918 Sewickley, Pennsylvania
- Died: March 13, 1993 (aged 75) Glen Cove, New York
- Party: Republican

Henry Manus Curran (January 2, 1918 – March 13, 1993) was an American politician from New York.

== Life ==
He was born on January 2, 1918, in Sewickley, Allegheny County, Pennsylvania. The family moved to Oyster Bay, Nassau County, New York, when Henry was still a child. He attended St. Dominic's Grammar and High School, and graduated from Pace College. He served in the U.S. Army during World War II, attaining the rank of captain, and served again in the Korean War. He engaged in the insurance business. He married Rita Rothmann (died 2009), and they had four children.

He entered politics as a Republican, was a deputy sheriff of Nassau County, and was Town Clerk of Oyster Bay from 1954 to 1960. He was a member of the New York State Senate from 1961 to 1968, sitting in the 173rd, 174th, 175th, 176th and 177th New York State Legislatures.

On January 27, 1969, he was appointed to the New York State Harness Racing Commission. He was Chairman of the Commission from 1973 to 1975.

He died on March 13, 1993, in North Shore University Hospital at Glen Cove, New York; and was buried at the Cemetery of the Holy Rood in Westbury.

== General Reference ==
- Henry Curran Papers, 1961-1968. M.E. Grenander Department of Special Collections and Archives, University Libraries, University at Albany, State University of New York (hereafter referred to as the Curran Papers).

New York State Senate
Preceded by Genesta M. Strong	New York State Senate; 3rd District; 1961–1965	Succeeded by Elisha T. Barrett
Preceded by Edward J. Speno	New York State Senate; 4th District; 1966	Succeeded by Edward J. Speno
Preceded by Elisha T. Barrett	New York State Senate; 3rd District; 1967–1968	Succeeded by Ralph J. Marino
