= Christian H. Armbruster =

American lawyer and politician (1921–1986)

Christian H. Armbruster (March 14, 1921 – February 24, 1986) was an American lawyer and politician from New York.

== Life ==
He was born on March 14, 1921, in Yonkers, Westchester County, New York. He graduated from Columbia College in 1944, and from Columbia Law School in 1947. He practiced law in Yonkers, and lived in Bronxville. He entered politics as a Republican, and was a member of the Board of Supervisors of Westchester County from 1949 to 1958.

He was a member of the New York State Assembly (Westchester Co., 1st D.) from 1959 to 1964, sitting in the 172nd, 173rd and 174th New York State Legislatures. In November 1964, he ran for re-election, but was defeated by Democrat Thomas J. McInerney.

Armbruster was a member of the New York State Senate in 1966. He did not run for re-election.

He died on February 24, 1986, in Doctor's Hospital in Manhattan, of a respiratory ailment.

== Sources ==
New York State Assembly
Preceded by Malcolm Wilson	New York State Assembly; Westchester County, 1st District; 1959–1964	Succeeded by Thomas J. McInerney
New York State Senate
Preceded by John E. Quinn	New York State Senate; 40th District; 1966	Succeeded by Julian B. Erway
