= Aileen B. Ryan =

American politician (1912–1987)

Aileen B. Ryan (September 5, 1912 – August 8, 1987) was an American politician from New York.

== Life ==
She was born Aileen Barlow on September 5, 1912, in the Bronx, New York City. She attended Public School No. 47, Cathedral High School, Hunter College, and New York University School of Law. Then she taught school in the public schools of New York City. In 1939, she married E. Gerard Ryan, a lawyer, and they had three children. After the death of her husband, she entered politics as a Democrat.

Aileen Ryan was a member of the New York State Assembly (Bronx Co., 11th D.) from 1959 to 1965, sitting in the 172nd, 173rd, 174th and 175th New York State Legislatures.

She was a member of the New York City Council from 1966 to 1983, elected at-large in the Bronx. In November 1966, she ran for Congress in the 24th District, but was defeated by the Republican incumbent Paul A. Fino. She left the City Council when the at-large seats were abolished in June 1983. She was a delegate to the 1972 and 1984 Democratic National Conventions.

In 1985, she moved to Point Lookout, in Nassau County, New York. She died on August 8, 1987, in Long Beach Memorial Hospital in Long Beach, New York.

The "Aileen B. Ryan Recreational Complex", located on the edge of Pelham Bay Park, was named after her.

== Sources ==
New York State Assembly
Preceded by Thomas E. Ferrandina	New York State Assembly; Bronx County, 11th District; 1959–1965	Succeeded by district abolished
