= Albert Berkowitz =

American lawyer and politician (1910–2008)

- Born: June 25, 1910
- Died: March 5, 2008 (aged 97)
- Occupation: Lawyer
- Football career

Career information
- College: Michigan (1930)

Albert Berkowitz (June 25, 1910 – March 5, 2008) was an American lawyer and politician from New York.

== Life ==
He was born on June 25, 1910, in Glens Falls, Warren County, New York, the son of Hyman Berkowitz and Anna Berkowitz, both Imperial-Russian emigrants. The family moved to Granville in 1913. He attended Granville High School until 1927. Then he went to Alfred University on a football scholarship, but transferred soon to the University of Michigan where he played for the Michigan Wolverines. He graduated A.B. from UM in 1931. He graduated from Albany Law School in 1933, was admitted to the bar and practiced law in Granville. In November 1934, he married Rena Solomon, and they had five children.

He was District Attorney of Washington County from 1954 to 1957. Berkowitz was elected on February 14, 1957, to the New York State Senate (37th D.), to fill the vacancy caused by the death of Henry Neddo. He was re-elected three times, and remained in the State Senate until 1964, sitting in the 171st, 172nd, 173rd and 174th New York State Legislatures. In November 1964, he ran for re-election, but was defeated by Democrat F. Warren Travers.

He was a member of the New York State Athletic Commission from 1965 to 1974. In 1974, he was appointed as Chairman of the New York State Commission of Correction.

He died on March 5, 2008, at his home in Granville; and was buried at the Temple Beth-El Cemetery there.

== Sources ==
New York State Senate
Preceded by Henry Neddo	New York State Senate; 37th District; 1957–1964	Succeeded by F. Warren Travers
