= J. Sidney Levine =

American politician

J. Sidney Levine (died December 22, 1955) was an American lawyer and politician from New York.

== Life ==
He was born in Brooklyn, New York City. He attended Boys High School, and graduated LL.B. from Brooklyn Law School.

Levine was a member of the New York State Assembly (Kings Co., 2nd D.) from 1945 until his death in 1955, sitting in the 165th, 166th, 167th, 168th, 169th and 170th New York State Legislatures.

He died on December 22, 1955.

== Sources ==
New York State Assembly
Preceded by Leo F. Rayfiel	New York State Assembly; Kings County, 2nd District; 1945–1955	Succeeded by Samuel Bonom
