= Joseph F. Egan =

American politician

Joseph F. Egan (c. 1917 – March 22, 1964) was an American lawyer and politician from New York.

== Life ==
He was born about 1917 in Schenectady, New York, the son of Joseph O. Egan and Nora Mulcare Egan. There he attended the public schools and St. Columba's High School. He graduated with a BBA from Michigan State University, and LL.B. from Albany Law School. He married Eileen M. Houlihan, and they had five children.

He was a combat pilot of the U.S. Marine Corps in the Pacific theater of World War II, and attained the rank of first lieutenant. He was awarded the Air Medal with two stars. After the war, he practiced law in Schenectady, and entered politics as a Republican.

Egan was a member of the Board of Supervisors of Schenectady County (Schenectady, 12th W.) from 1956 to 1959, and was Majority Leader in 1958 and 1959. He was elected on November 3, 1959, to the New York State Assembly (Schenectady Co.), to fill the vacancy caused by the death of Oswald D. Heck. He was re-elected twice, and remained in the State Assembly until his death in 1964, sitting in the 172nd, 173rd and 174th New York State Legislatures.

From October 1963 to February 1964, he was in hospital with a severe heart condition. Early in March he appeared again in the Assembly, and announced that he was cured and would run for re-election in November. He died on March 22, 1964, at his home at 431 Furman Street in Schenectady, New York, after another heart attack; and was buried at the St. Joseph's Cemetery there.

The "Joseph F. Egan Memorial Supreme Court Law Library" in Schenectady was named in his honor.

== Sources ==
New York State Assembly
Preceded by Oswald D. Heck	New York State Assembly; Schenectady County; 1960–1964	Succeeded by John F. Kirvin
