= Julian B. Erway =

American politician

Julian B. Erway (March 17, 1899 – January 9, 1970) was an American lawyer and politician from New York.

== Life ==
He was born on March 17, 1899, in Groton, Tompkins County, New York. He attended the district school, and for one year Groton High School. During World War I he served as a private in the United States Marine Corps. After the war, he went to Cortland High School to finish his high school course. He graduated from Albany Law School and practiced law in Albany. He married Genevieve Ryan, but they had no children.

Erway was elected on November 4, 1941, to the New York State Senate (30th D.), to fill the vacancy caused by the resignation of Erastus Corning 2nd, and took his seat in the 163rd New York State Legislature in January 1942. He was re-elected in 1942, and remained in the Senate until 1944, sitting in the 164th New York State Legislature.

He was District Attorney of Albany County from 1945 to 1953.

He was again elected on November 5, 1957, to the State Senate, to fill the vacancy caused by the resignation of Peter J. Dalessandro. He was re-elected several times and remained in the Senate until 1968, sitting in the 171st, 172nd, 173rd, 174th, 175th, 176th and 177th New York State Legislatures. In the fall of 1964, he married Mrs. Marie O'Connor.

He died on January 9, 1970, while on vacation in Fort Lauderdale, Florida; and was buried at the Holy Sepulchre Cemetery in East Greenbush, New York.

== Sources ==
New York State Senate
| Preceded by Erastus Corning 2nd | New York State Senate; 30th District; 1942–1944 | Succeeded by J. Raymond McGovern |
| Preceded by Peter J. Dalessandro | New York State Senate; 36th District; 1958–1965 | Succeeded by Abraham Bernstein |
| Preceded by John H. Hughes | New York State Senate; 45th District; 1966 | Succeeded by John H. Hughes |
| Preceded by Christian H. Armbruster | New York State Senate; 40th District; 1967–1968 | Succeeded by Walter B. Langley |
