= Ernest I. Hatfield =

American politician

Ernest Isadore Hatfield (April 23, 1890 – March 1977) was an American politician from New York.

== Life ==
He was born on April 23, 1890, in Valhalla, Westchester County, New York, the son of Gilbert Joshua Hatfield (1836-1922) and Adele Marie Antoinette (Ledelley) Hatfield (1849-1924). He attended the public schools, and Eastman-Gaines Business College in New York City. He engaged in the real estate and insurance business, and later also in banking, in Poughkeepsie. He owned a 400-acre farm in Hyde Park, Dutchess County, New York.

Hatfield was a member of the New York State Assembly from 1943 to 1947, sitting in the 164th, 165th and 166th New York State Legislatures. He resigned his seat to run for the State Senate seat vacated by the resignation of Frederic H. Bontecou.

Hatfield was elected on November 4, 1947, to the New York State Senate (33rd D.), and took his seat in the 166th New York State Legislature at the beginning of the session in January 1948. He was re-elected several times and remained in the State Senate until 1964, sitting in the 167th, 168th, 169th, 170th, 171st, 172nd, 173rd and 174th New York State Legislatures.

He died in March 1977 in Dutchess County, New York.

== Sources ==
New York State Assembly
| Preceded by Emerson D. Fite | New York State Assembly; Dutchess County, 2nd District; 1943–1944 | Succeeded by district abolished |
| Preceded by new district | New York State Assembly; Dutchess County; 1945–1947 | Succeeded by Robert Watson Pomeroy |
New York State Senate
| Preceded by Frederic H. Bontecou | New York State Senate; 33rd District; 1948–1954 | Succeeded by Thomas C. Desmond |
| Preceded by Peter J. Dalessandro | New York State Senate; 35th District; 1955–1964 | Succeeded by Robert Watson Pomeroy |
