= Harold I. Tyler =

American politician (1901–1967)

Member of the New York State Assembly from Madison County
- In office 1953–1965
- Preceded by: Wheeler Milmoe

Member of the New York State Assembly from the 128th District
- In office 1966–1966
- Succeeded by: Frederick L. Warder

Member of the New York State Assembly from the 114th District
- In office 1967–1967
- Preceded by: Douglas Hudson
- Succeeded by: Richard A. Brown

Personal details
- Born: April 11, 1901 Chittenango, New York, U.S.
- Died: November 23, 1967 (aged 66)
- Party: Republican
- Education: Central City Business Institute, Simmons School of Embalming

Harold I. Tyler (April 11, 1901 – November 23, 1967) was an American businessman and politician from New York.

== Life ==
He was born on April 11, 1901, in Chittenango, New York, the son of William I. Tyler and Grace (Dunham) Tyler. He attended Storm King School. Then he attended Central City Business Institute and Simmons School of Embalming in Syracuse, and became a funeral director, like his father. In 1928, he married Jewel Ferguson, and they had one son.

Tyler entered politics as a Republican. He was a member of the New York State Assembly from 1953 until his death in 1967, sitting in the 169th, 170th, 171st, 172nd, 173rd, 174th, 175th, 176th and 177th New York State Legislatures.

== Death ==
Tyler died on November 23, 1967 and was buried at the Oakwood Cemetery in Chittenango.

New York State Assembly
Preceded by Wheeler Milmoe	New York State Assembly; Madison County; 1953–1965	Succeeded by district abolished
Preceded by new district	New York State Assembly; 128th District; 1966	Succeeded by Frederick L. Warder
Preceded by Douglas Hudson	New York State Assembly; 114th District; 1967	Succeeded by Richard A. Brown
