= Owen M. Begley =

American lawyer and politician (1906–1981)

Owen M. Begley (May 16, 1906 – September 24, 1981) was an American lawyer and politician from New York.

== Early life and education ==
He was born on May 16, 1906, in Schenectady, New York. He graduated from Union College and Albany Law School. He was admitted to the bar, and practiced law in Schenectady.

== Career ==
He entered politics as a Democrat. In 1932 and 1933, he ran for a seat in the New York State Assembly (Schenectady Co., 1st D.), but was both times defeated by Republican Oswald D. Heck. Begley was an Assistant New York Attorney General from 1935 to 1942. During World War II he served in the U.S. Army. He was Mayor of Schenectady from 1948 to 1951. Begley was Schenectady's first Democratic mayor since 1931. He lost his re-election bid in 1951 to Republican Archibald C. Wemple.

Begley was a member of the New York State Senate (38th D.) from 1958 to 1965, sitting in the 171st, 172nd, 173rd, 174th and 175th New York State Legislatures. In May 1965, Begley was questioned about a possible conflict-of-interest, but a New York County grand jury did not find anything amiss. He decided not to run for re-election after his district (consisting of Schenectady and Schoharie counties) was cut up at the December 1964 re-apportionment.

== Death ==
He died on September 24, 1981, at his home in Schenectady, New York.

New York State Senate
Preceded by Thomas F. Campbell	Member of the New York State Senate from the 38th district 1958–1965	Succeeded by John D. Calandra
