= Frank S. McCullough =

American politician

Frank S. McCullough (September 4, 1905 – March 11, 1998) was an American lawyer and politician from New York.

== Life ==
He was born on September 4, 1905. He attended Rye High School, Iona Preparatory School and University of Notre Dame. He practiced law in Rye. In 1938, he married Lovedy McPherson (1905–1989), and they had three children.

McCullough was Supervisor of the City of Rye from 1942 to 1944; a member of the New York State Assembly (Westchester Co., 4th D.) from 1945 to 1950, sitting in the 165th, 166th and 167th New York State Legislatures; and a member of the New York State Senate (30th D.) from 1951 to 1959, sitting in the 168th, 169th, 170th, 171st and 172nd New York State Legislatures.

In 1959, he was appointed as County Judge of Westchester County, and in November 1959 was elected to succeed himself. In November 1960, he was elected to a 14-year term on the New York Supreme Court (9th D.), and remained on the bench from 1961 to 1974. He was the Administrative Judge of the Ninth Judicial District from 1972 to 1974.

He died on March 11, 1998, in United Hospital in Port Chester, New York.

New York State Assembly
Preceded by Jane H. Todd	New York State Assembly; Westchester County, 4th District; 1945–1950	Succeeded by Hunter Meighan
New York State Senate
Preceded by J. Raymond McGovern	New York State Senate; 30th District; 1951–1959	Succeeded by Hunter Meighan
