= Genesta M. Strong =

American politician

Genesta M. Strong (November 29, 1885 – June 29, 1972) was an American politician from New York.

== Life ==
She was born Genesta Mitchell on November 29, 1885, in Brooklyn. On September 12, 1906, she married Ernest Melvin Strong (1881–1961), and their only child was Genesta Mitchell (Strong) Raymond (1910–1982). She entered politics as a Republican.

She was a member of the New York State Assembly (Nassau Co., 3rd D.) from 1945 to 1959, sitting in the 165th, 166th, 167th, 168th, 169th, 170th, 171st and 172nd New York State Legislatures.

On November 3, 1959, she was elected to the New York State Senate (3rd D.), to fill the vacancy caused by the resignation of William S. Hults Jr. She didn't take her seat, and resigned on January 6, 1960, because of ill health.

She died on June 29, 1972, in Plandome Heights, New York.

== Sources ==
New York State Assembly
Preceded by new district	New York State Assembly; Nassau County, 3rd District; 1945–1959	Succeeded by John E. Kingston
New York State Senate
Preceded by William S. Hults Jr.	New York State Senate; 3rd District; 1960	Succeeded by Henry M. Curran
