= Douglas Hudson =

American politician (1905–1983)

Member of the New York State Assembly from Rensselaer County
- In office 1960–1964
- Preceded by: Thomas H. Brown
- Succeeded by: James A. Lombard

Member of the New York State Assembly from the 114th District
- In office 1966–1966
- Succeeded by: Harold I. Tyler

Member of the New York State Senate from the 39th District
- In office 1967–1972
- Preceded by: Anthony B. Gioffre
- Succeeded by: Jay P. Rolison, Jr.

Member of the New York State Senate from the 41st District
- In office 1973–1976
- Preceded by: Dalwin J. Niles
- Succeeded by: Joseph Bruno

Personal details
- Born: May 25, 1905 Castleton, New York, U.S.
- Died: May 2, 1983 (aged 77) Albany, New York, U.S.
- Party: Republican
- Education: Albany Business College

Douglas Hudson (May 25, 1905 – May 2, 1983) was an American politician from New York.

== Biography ==
He was born on May 25, 1905, in Castleton, New York, and resided in Rensselaer County, New York for his entire life. He graduated from Albany Business College and entered politics as a Republican.

He was a Deputy Sheriff in 1942 when he was appointed as Rensselaer County Welfare Commissioner. In 1951 he became Chairman of the Rensselaer County Republican Party. In 1952, Hudson was appointed as Sheriff of Rensselaer County, and later was elected to the post twice.

In November 1959, Hudson was elected to the New York State Assembly to fill the vacancy caused by the resignation of Thomas H. Brown. He was re-elected twice and remained in the Assembly until 1964, sitting in the 172nd, 173rd and 174th New York State Legislatures. In November 1964, he ran for re-election, but was defeated by Democrat James A. Lombard. In November 1965, he was elected again to the Assembly, and sat in the 176th New York State Legislature.

Hudson was a member of the New York State Senate from 1967 to 1976, sitting in the 177th, 178th, 179th, 180th and 181st New York State Legislatures. In 1975, Hudson pleaded guilty to reckless driving and paid a fine after having been charged with driving while intoxicated and leaving the scene of an accident.

Hudson died on May 2, 1983, in Memorial Hospital in Albany, New York; and was buried at the Horizon View Cemetery in Brookview.

Hudson Hall at Hudson Valley Community College is named for him.

== Sources ==
New York State Assembly
| Preceded by Thomas H. Brown | New York State Assembly; Rensselaer County; 1960–1964 | Succeeded by James A. Lombard |
| Preceded by new district | New York State Assembly; 114th District; 1966 | Succeeded by Harold I. Tyler |
New York State Senate
| Preceded by Anthony B. Gioffre | New York State Senate; 39th District; 1967–1972 | Succeeded by Jay P. Rolison, Jr. |
| Preceded by Dalwin J. Niles | New York State Senate; 41st District; 1973–1976 | Succeeded by Joseph Bruno |
