= Bessie A. Buchanan =

American politician (1902–1980)

Bessie Allison Buchanan
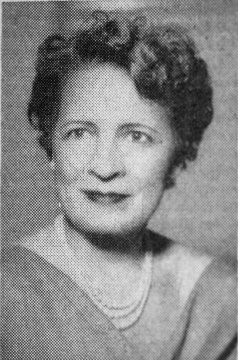

Member of the New York State Assembly from the 12th district
- In office January 1, 1955 – December 31, 1962
- Preceded by: Leslie T. Turner
- Succeeded by: Mark T. Southall

Personal details
- Born: March 7, 1902 New York City, U.S.
- Died: September 7, 1980 (aged 78) New York City, U.S.
- Party: Democratic

Bessie Allison Buchanan (March 7, 1902 – September 7, 1980), of Manhattan in New York City, became the first African-American woman to hold a seat in the New York State Legislature when she was elected to the New York State Assembly in 1954.

== Family and early life ==
Charles and Evelyn Allison moved to New York City from Petersburg, Virginia, around the turn of the 20th century. Their daughter Bessie was born on March 7, 1902, and grew up in New York City with her five sisters and one brother.

=== Singer and dancer ===
From a young age, Bessie Allison had an interest in singing and dance. She appeared in the original Shuffle Along in 1921, the first successful musical comedy with an all African-American cast. She was in the 1925 edition of Plantation Revue and in the integrated cast of Lucky in 1927. She performed with the Show Boat road company and recorded for Black Swan Records. Bessie also danced in the chorus line of the famed Cotton Club.

Bessie Allison met Charlie Buchanan, who was the director of the Savoy Ballroom, while she was working as a dancer and singer in Harlem. They were married in 1929 and she retired from the stage.

== Harlem socialite ==
After her marriage, Bessie was active in Woman's Civic Club activities in Harlem. She frequented the popular night clubs. Jet magazine and other publication wrote about her social comings and goings. It has been alleged that she had a lesbian relationship with dancer and entertainer Josephine Baker.

=== 1951 Stork Club incident ===
Buchanan was in Josephine Baker's party at the Stork Club in 1951 when Baker became dissatisfied with her service and stormed out of the nightclub. Baker claimed she had been treated in a racist way and a public debate occurred in the media, with high-profile celebrities taking sides. Baker and Buchanan organized protests and a picket line to pressure the Stork Club's clientele to boycott the club.

== Political career ==
Buchanan became interested in politics while she was campaigning for Governor Herbert H. Lehman's election to the United States Senate in 1949. After Lehman was elected, she stayed involved with community and political organizations in Harlem. In 1954 she was approached about running as the Democratic Party candidate for the New York State Assembly from Harlem's 12th district. In the general election, Buchanan won easily over her opponent Lucille Pickett, another black woman, 22,401 to 6,177 votes in a district heavily dominated by Democrats. Buchanan was reelected three more times and served a total of eight years. She was the first black woman elected to the New York State Legislature.

=== New York State Assemblywoman ===
Buchanan was a member of the New York State Assembly (New York Co., 12th district) from 1955 to 1962, sitting in the 170th, 171st, 172nd and 173rd New York State Legislatures. While in the legislature, she served on the Cities, Institutions, Printing, and Social Welfare committees. She was assigned to the Joint Legislative Committee on the Problems of the Aging.

In 1960, Buchanan was selected by Governor Nelson Rockefeller as a delegate to the White House Conference on the Aged. In 1962, Buchanan did not run for reelection. Instead, she crossed party lines and supported Rockefeller and Senator Jacob Javits (both Republicans) for re-election.

=== Commissioner of the Human Rights Division ===
On April 30, 1963, Gov. Rockefeller appointed Buchanan as New York State Commissioner of Human Rights. She remained in office for five years.

== Later life, death, and legacy ==
Buchanan remained active in community activities after she left public office. She died in 1980 at the age of 78 after a short illness.

New York State Assembly
Preceded by Leslie T. Turner	New York State Assembly; New York County, 12th District; 1955–1962	Succeeded by Mark T. Southall
