= John T. Satriale =

American lawyer and politician

John T. Satriale (July 13, 1919 – November 2017) was an American lawyer and politician from New York.

== Life ==
He was born on July 13, 1919, in New York City, the son of Gaudioso Satriale (1884–1968). He attended Public School No. 6, and DeWitt Clinton High School. He graduated from Fordham College, and LL.B. from Brooklyn Law School.

Satriale was a member of the New York State Assembly from 1949 to 1965, sitting in the 167th, 168th, 169th, 170th, 171st, 172nd, 173rd, 174th and 175th New York State Legislatures. He was Chairman of the Committee on Ways and Means in 1965. In September 1965, after re-apportionment, he ran in the 89th District for re-nomination, but was defeated in the Democratic primary by Robert Abrams. He died in November 2017 at the age of 98.

== Sources ==
New York State Assembly
Preceded by Louis Bennett	New York State Assembly; Bronx County, 8th District; 1949–1954	Succeeded by Mitchell J. Sherwin
Preceded by Walter H. Gladwin	New York State Assembly; Bronx County, 7th District; 1955–1965	Succeeded by district abolished
Preceded by Fred W. Preller	New York State Assembly; Chairman of the Committee on Ways and Means; 1965	Succeeded by Harvey M. Lifset
