= Fred W. Preller =

American politician

Fred Preller

Member of the New York State Assembly from the 9th district
- In office January 11, 1944 – January 12, 1965

Chairman of the Ways and Means Committee of New York State
- In office January 10, 1961 – January 14, 1964
- Governor: Nelson Rockefeller

Chairman of the Queens County Republican Committee
- In office September 22, 1962 – January 25, 1965
- Governor: Nelson Rockefeller
- Succeeded by: George Archinal

Personal details
- Born: March 29, 1902 Brooklyn, New York, U.S.
- Died: August 29, 1974 (aged 72) Queens, New York, U.S.
- Party: Republican
- Spouse: Valerie Preller

Frederick Werner Preller (March 29, 1902 – August 29, 1974) was a New York State Assemblyman from 1944 until 1965.

== Life ==
He was born on March 29, 1902, in Greenpoint, Brooklyn, New York City. He attended St. Nicholas Parochial School and St. Nicholas Commercial High School. From about 1930 on, he worked as a securities consultant for Eastman Dillon & Co., after a merger in 1956 known as Eastman Dillon, Union Securities & Co.

Preller was a member of the New York State Assembly from 1945 to 1965, sitting in the 165th, 166th, 167th, 168th, 169th, 170th, 171st, 172nd, 173rd, 174th and 175th New York State Legislatures; and was Chairman of the Committee on Ways and Means from 1961 to 1964.

He was an alternate delegate to the 1944 and 1964 Republican National Conventions. He was Chairman of the Queens County Republican Committee from September 1962 to January 1965.

In October 1964, Preller was questioned about his missing income tax returns from 1960 to 1962. In December 1965, he was accused of not filing income tax returns from 1959 to 1963. In 1969, he pleaded guilty to not having paid income tax in 1961.

He died on August 29, 1974, at his home at 218–05 100th Avenue in Queens Village, Queens.

Preller's grandson, James Preller, would go on to become an author.

== Sources ==
New York State Assembly
Preceded by new district	New York State Assembly; Queens County, 9th District; 1945–1965	Succeeded by district abolished
Preceded by William H. MacKenzie	New York State Assembly; Chairman of the Committee on Ways and Means; 1961–1964	Succeeded by John T. Satriale
