= Walter Van Wiggeren =

American politician

Walter M. Van Wiggeren (November 12, 1887 – September 29, 1968) was an American engineer and politician from New York.

== Life ==
He was born on November 12, 1887, in Yorkville, Oneida County, New York, the son of Walter Jelle Van Wiggeren (1856–1917) and Dieuwke (Zijlstra) Van Wiggeren (born 1862), both Dutch emigrants from Frisia. In 1900, the family removed to Ilion, in Herkimer County, where Walter Van Wiggeren Sr. worked for Remington Arms. Walter Jr. attended the public schools. He became a draftsman, and later a mechanical engineer, and designed tools and machinery for Remington Arms. On September 2, 1913, he married Gladys Bradbury (1886–1974).

He was Mayor of Ilion for two years, Clerk of Herkimer County from 1928 to 1949, and a delegate to the 1944 Republican National Convention.

Van Wiggeren was elected on February 8, 1949, to the New York State Senate, to fill the vacancy caused by the appointment of Fred A. Young to the New York Court of Claims. Van Wiggeren remained in the State Senate until 1964, sitting in the 167th, 168th, 169th, 170th, 171st, 172nd, 173rd and 174th New York State Legislatures. In June 1964, he ran for re-nomination in the Republican primary, but was defeated by Dalwin J. Niles. In November 1964, he ran for re-election on the Conservative ticket, but was defeated again.

He died on September 29, 1968, in Mohawk Valley General Hospital in Ilion, New York; and was buried at the Armory Hill Cemetery there.

New York State Senate
Preceded by Fred A. Young	New York State Senate; 40th District; 1949–1954	Succeeded by Robert C. McEwen
Preceded by Fred J. Rath	New York State Senate; 41st District; 1955–1964	Succeeded by Dalwin J. Niles
