= George W. Cornell =

American lawyer

George W. Cornell (September 29, 1896 – March 24, 1988) was an American lawyer and politician from New York.

== Life ==
Cornell was born in 1896, in Brooklyn (before it became a county of New York City), the son of George W. Cornell and Minnie C. (née White) Cornell. Cornell attended Bushwick High School, later graduating from Amherst College in 1918, and from Columbia Law School in 1921. He practiced law in New York City.

Eight generations of Cornells served as elected town officials in Scarsdale, New York since the arrival in 1713 of Richard Cornell, a grandson of a 1636 Boston settler, Thomas Cornell. George W. Cornell was a Trustee of the Village of Scarsdale from 1943–46; Supervisor of the Town of Scarsdale from 1947–58; and a member of the New York State Senate (31st D.) from 1959–64, sitting in the 172nd, 173rd and 174th New York State Legislatures.

He was a delegate to the New York State Constitutional Convention of 1967. In 1970, he moved to Boca Raton, Florida, and practiced law there.

== Death ==
He died on March 24, 1988, at his home in Boca Raton, Florida, aged 91.

== Sources ==
New York State Senate
Preceded by Pliny W. Williamson	New York State Senate; 31st District; 1959–1964	Succeeded by Bernard G. Gordon
