= Fred J. Rath =

American businessman and politician

Member of the New York State Senate from the 42nd district
- In office January 1, 1955 – December 31, 1964
- Preceded by: Henry A. Wise
- Succeeded by: William S. Calli

Member of the New York State Senate from the 41st district
- In office January 1, 1951 – December 31, 1954
- Preceded by: John T. McKennan
- Succeeded by: Walter Van Wiggeren

Mayor of Utica, New York
- In office 1928–1930
- Preceded by: Frederick Gillmore
- Succeeded by: Charles S. Donnelley

Personal details
- Born: October 15, 1888 Utica, New York, U.S.
- Died: April 9, 1968 (aged 79) Utica, New York, U.S.
- Party: Republican
- Spouse: Louise
- Occupation: Politician, businessman

Fred J. Rath (October 15, 1888 – April 9, 1968) was an American businessman and politician from New York.

== Life ==
He was born on October 15, 1888, in Utica, Oneida County, New York. He attended the public schools. Then he worked as a chauffeur, a car salesman, and as manager, and later owner, of an automobile repair shop. He married Louise, who was a court stenographer from 1913 to 1958, but they had no children.

He was Mayor of Utica in 1929; and a member of the New York State Senate from 1951 to 1964, sitting in the 168th, 169th, 170th, 171st, 172nd, 173rd and 174th New York State Legislatures.

He died on April 9, 1968, in St. Elizabeth Hospital in Utica, New York, after a long illness.

== Sources ==
New York State Senate
Preceded by John T. McKennan	New York State Senate; 41st District; 1951–1954	Succeeded by Walter Van Wiggeren
Preceded by Henry A. Wise	New York State Senate; 42nd District; 1955–1964	Succeeded by William S. Calli
