= Samuel Bonom =

American lawyer and politician

Samuel Bonom (March 7, 1912 – December 15, 1962) was an American lawyer and politician from New York.

== Life ==
Bonom was born on March 7, 1912, in Brooklyn, New York City. He attended Thomas Jefferson High School, New York University and Fordham Law School. He married Clarice Juliet Goldberg (1910–1998), and they had two children. He practiced law in New York City, and was an Assistant D.A. of Kings County.

He was elected on February 7, 1956, to the New York State Assembly (Kings Co., 2nd D.), to fill the vacancy caused by the death of J. Sidney Levine. Bonom was re-elected three times, and remained in the State Assembly until his death in 1962, sitting in the 170th, 171st, 172nd and 173rd New York State Legislatures. In November 1962, he was re-elected, but died on December 15, 1962, before the next Legislature convened.

== Sources ==
New York State Assembly
Preceded by J. Sidney Levine	New York State Assembly; Kings County, 2nd District; 1956–1962	Succeeded by Noah Goldstein
