= Palmer D. Farrington =

American politician

Member of the New York State Assembly from Nassau's 6th district
- In office January 1, 1955 – June 26, 1961
- Preceded by: District created
- Succeeded by: Robert M. Blakeman

Personal details
- Born: April 20, 1918 Queens, New York City, New York
- Died: November 20, 1996 (aged 78)
- Party: Republican

Palmer D. Farrington (April 20, 1918 – November 20, 1996) was an American politician who served in the New York State Assembly from Nassau's 6th district from 1955 to 1961.
