= Richard J. Bartlett =

American jurist and politician (1926–2015)

Richard James Bartlett (February 15, 1926 – May 6, 2015) was an American jurist and state legislator.

== Early life and education ==
Born in Glens Falls, New York, Bartlett received his bachelor's degree from Georgetown University in 1949 and his law degree from Harvard Law School in 1949. During the Korean War, Bartlett served as captain in the United States Air Force, in the United States Air Force Judge Advocate General's Corps.

== Political career ==
Bartlett served in the New York State Assembly from 1959 until 1966 and was a Republican. He then served as a delegate in the New York Constitutional Convention of 1967.

In 1961, Bartlett was appointed chairman of the Temporary Commission on Revision of the Penal Law and Criminal Code, tasked with a complete overhaul of the New York State criminal code. Prior to this, the penal law had not had a major revision since 1880. The commission was established by Governor Nelson Rockefeller. Appointees to the commission included Timothy N. Pfeiffer, and special counsels Richard D. Denzer, and Peter J. McQuillan. The commission worked for ten years, with numerous revisions and submissions to the legislature, before the final draft of the new code became law in 1971.

Bartlett served as New York Supreme Court Justice from 1973 to 1979. During that time, Bartlett was appointed New York State Chief Administrative Judge of the Courts serving from 1974 to 1979. During his five years in the post, the Office of Court Administration was established to centralize management of the state's trial court system, and a permanent Judicial Conduct Commission was set up to deal with judges accused of misconduct.

== Albany Law School Dean ==
Bartlett served as dean and professor of law at the Albany Law School from 1979 to 1985 and then returned to his law practice.

== Death ==
Bartlett died at his home in Glens Falls, New York.
