= Michael J. Capanegro =

American politician

Member of the New York State Assembly from Queens's 8th district
- In office January 1, 1961 – December 31, 1965
- Preceded by: John DiLeonardo
- Succeeded by: District abolished

Personal details
- Born: May 17, 1927 Queens, New York City, New York
- Died: March 17, 2004 (aged 76) Lloyd Harbor, New York
- Party: Democratic

Michael J. Capanegro (May 17, 1927 – March 17, 2004) was an American politician who served in the New York State Assembly from Queens's 8th district from 1961 to 1965.

He died on March 17, 2004, in Lloyd Harbor, New York at age 76.
