= Felipe N. Torres =

American politician

Member of the New York State Assembly from The Bronx's 4th district
- In office January 1, 1955 – December 31, 1962
- Preceded by: Jacob H. Gilbert
- Succeeded by: Frank Torres

Member of the New York State Assembly from The Bronx's 5th district
- In office November 1953 – December 31, 1954
- Preceded by: David Ross
- Succeeded by: Melville E. Abrams

Personal details
- Born: May 26, 1897 Salinas, Puerto Rico
- Died: April 3, 1994 (aged 96) White Plains, New York, U.S.
- Party: Democratic
- Education: City College of New York (BS); Fordham University School of Law (LLB)

Military service
- Allegiance: United States of America
- Branch/service: United States Army
- Rank: Second lieutenant

Felipe N. Torres (May 26, 1897 – April 3, 1994) was an American politician who served in the New York State Assembly from 1953 to 1962 and appointed the first Puerto Rican Judge of the Family Court, State of New York in 1963.

Felipe N. Torres graduated from Ponce High School. He served in the United States Army as a Second Lieutenant infantry officer during the World War II era. In 1919, he traveled alone to New York City; his goal to attend college. Worked as dishwasher at the Commodore Hotel, and others jobs as jackhammer operator at the Brooklyn Navy Yard, and the United States Post Office. Felipe graduated with a Bachelor of Science in 1940 from City College of New York and obtained his Bachelor of Laws from Fordham University School of Law in New York in 1925.

He died on April 3, 1994, in White Plains, New York at age 96.
