= Paul A. Worlock =

American politician

Member of the New York State Assembly from Oneida's 1st district
- In office January 1, 1961 – December 31, 1965
- Preceded by: David R. Townsend
- Succeeded by: District abolished

Personal details
- Born: September 21, 1931 Rome, New York
- Died: April 9, 2017 (aged 85) Rome, New York
- Party: Democratic

Paul A. Worlock (September 21, 1931 – April 9, 2017) was an American politician who served in the New York State Assembly from Oneida's 1st district from 1961 to 1965.

He died on April 9, 2017, in Rome, New York at age 85.
