= Francis P. McCloskey =

American politician

Member of the New York State Assembly from the 9th district
- In office January 1, 1967 – December 31, 1970
- Preceded by: Martin Ginsberg
- Succeeded by: Philip B. Healey

Member of the New York State Assembly from the 8th district
- In office January 1, 1966 – December 31, 1966
- Preceded by: District created
- Succeeded by: Martin Ginsberg

Member of the New York State Assembly from Nassau's 5th district
- In office January 1, 1955 – December 31, 1964
- Preceded by: District created
- Succeeded by: Herbert Sachs

Personal details
- Born: July 22, 1917 New York City, New York
- Died: July 1, 2010 (aged 92) Frederick, Maryland
- Party: Republican

Francis P. McCloskey (July 22, 1917 – July 1, 2010) was an American politician who served in the New York State Assembly from 1955 to 1964 and from 1966 to 1970.

He died on July 1, 2010, in Frederick, Maryland at age 92.
