= Verner M. Ingram =

American politician

Member of the New York State Assembly from the 121st district
- In office January 1, 1966 – December 31, 1966
- Preceded by: District created
- Succeeded by: John H. Terry

Member of the New York State Assembly from the St. Lawrence district
- In office January 1, 1957 – December 31, 1965
- Preceded by: Allan P. Sill
- Succeeded by: District abolished

Personal details
- Born: August 27, 1911 Potsdam, New York
- Died: September 15, 1997 (aged 86)
- Party: Republican

Verner M. Ingram Sr. (August 27, 1911 – September 15, 1997) was an American politician who served in the New York State Assembly from 1957 to 1966.
