= Willard C. Drumm =

American politician

Member of the New York State Assembly from the Columbia district
- In office January 1, 1947 – December 31, 1965
- Preceded by: Fred A. Washburn
- Succeeded by: District abolished

Personal details
- Born: October 1, 1897
- Died: June 6, 1983 (aged 85) Niverville, New York
- Party: Republican

Willard C. Drumm (October 1, 1897 – June 6, 1983) was an American politician who served in the New York State Assembly from the Columbia district from 1947 to 1965.

He died of a heart attack on June 6, 1983, in Niverville, New York at age 85.
