= Joseph R. Younglove =

American politician

Member of the New York State Assembly from the Fulton-Hamilton district
- In office February 1941 – December 31, 1964
- Preceded by: Denton D. Lake
- Succeeded by: Glenn H. Harris

Personal details
- Born: July 5, 1893 Johnstown, New York
- Died: May 1978 (aged 84)
- Party: Republican

Joseph R. Younglove (July 5, 1893 – May 1978) was an American politician who served in the New York State Assembly from the Fulton-Hamilton district from 1941 to 1964.
