= Anthony P. Savarese Jr. =

American politician

Member of the New York State Assembly from Queens's 13th district
- In office January 1, 1955 – December 31, 1964
- Preceded by: District created
- Succeeded by: Frederick D. Schmidt

Member of the New York State Assembly from Queens's 7th district
- In office January 1, 1949 – December 31, 1954
- Preceded by: George P. Stier
- Succeeded by: Bernard Dubin

Personal details
- Born: July 24, 1917 Queens, New York City, New York
- Died: August 5, 2002 (aged 85) Port Washington, New York
- Party: Republican
- Education: Rutgers University; Harvard Law School

Anthony P. Savarese Jr. (July 24, 1917 – August 5, 2002) was an American politician who served in the New York State Assembly from 1949 to 1964.

He died on August 5, 2002, in Port Washington, New York at age 85.
