= Hyman E. Mintz =

American politician

Member of the New York State Assembly from the Sullivan district
- In office January 1, 1951 – December 31, 1965
- Preceded by: James G. Lyons
- Succeeded by: District abolished

Personal details
- Born: October 6, 1908 South Fallsburg, New York
- Died: March 25, 1966 (aged 57) Manhattan, New York City, New York
- Party: Republican

Hyman E. Mintz (October 6, 1908 – March 25, 1966) was an American politician who served in the New York State Assembly from the Sullivan district from 1951 to 1965.

Mintz was accused of bribery and perjury charges for trying to get insider information on a grand jury probe of the Finger Lakes Race Track in Canandaigua, N. Y. His aide Morris Gold, and Police Chief Carl Kaplan were also investigated. Mintz was found guilty and sentenced to one year in prison. (1965)

He died of a heart condition on March 25, 1966, in Manhattan, New York City, New York at age 57.
