= Louis H. Folmer =

American politician

Member of the New York State Assembly from the 122nd district
- In office January 1, 1967 – December 31, 1968
- Preceded by: Donald J. Mitchell
- Succeeded by: George M. Michaels

Member of the New York State Assembly from the 127th district
- In office January 1, 1966 – December 31, 1966
- Preceded by: Charles D. Henderson
- Succeeded by: District abolished

Member of the New York State Assembly from the Cortland district
- In office January 1, 1951 – December 31, 1965
- Preceded by: Harold L. Creal
- Succeeded by: District abolished

Personal details
- Born: April 15, 1904
- Died: February 1983 (aged 78)
- Party: Republican

Louis H. Folmer (April 15, 1904 – February 1983) was an American politician who served in the New York State Assembly from 1951 to 1968.
