= Prescott B. Huntington =

American politician

Member of the New York State Assembly from the 4th district
- In office January 1, 1966 – December 31, 1970
- Preceded by: District created
- Succeeded by: Robert C. Wertz

Member of the New York State Assembly from Suffolk's 2nd district
- In office January 1, 1957 – December 31, 1965
- Preceded by: Elisha T. Barrett
- Succeeded by: District abolished

Personal details
- Born: July 26, 1905 St. James, New York, U.S.
- Died: March 24, 1988 (aged 82) St. James, New York, U.S.
- Party: Republican
- Education: Harvard College; Harvard Law School

Prescott B. Huntington (July 26, 1905 – March 24, 1988) was an American politician who served in the New York State Assembly from 1957 to 1970.

He died on March 24, 1988, in St. James, New York at age 82.

His great-grandfather was New York assemblyman, Suffolk County district attorney, and Suffolk County judge J. Lawrence Smith.
