= Grant W. Johnson =

American politician

Member of the New York State Assembly from the Essex district
- In office January 1, 1952 – June 7, 1965
- Preceded by: L. Judson Morhouse
- Succeeded by: District abolished

Personal details
- Born: August 30, 1903 Ticonderoga, New York
- Died: June 7, 1965 (aged 61) Albany, New York
- Party: Republican

Grant W. Johnson (August 30, 1903 – June 7, 1965) was an American politician who served in the New York State Assembly from the Essex district from 1952 to 1965.

He died of a heart attack on June 7, 1965, in Albany, New York at age 61.
