= Hayward H. Plumadore =

American politician

Member of the New York State Assembly from the Franklin district
- In office January 1960 – December 31, 1964
- Preceded by: Robert G. Main
- Succeeded by: James LaPan

Personal details
- Born: July 13, 1913 Lyon Mountain, New York
- Died: July 30, 2001 (aged 88)
- Party: Republican

Hayward H. Plumadore (July 13, 1913 – July 30, 2001) was an American politician who served in the New York State Assembly from the Franklin district from 1960 to 1964.
