= Jules G. Sabbatino =

American politician

Member of the New York State Assembly from the 32nd district
- In office January 1, 1967 – December 31, 1970
- Preceded by: Stanley J. Pryor
- Succeeded by: John G. Lopresto

Member of the New York State Assembly from the 33rd district
- In office January 1, 1966 – December 31, 1966
- Preceded by: District created
- Succeeded by: Thomas V. LaFauci

Member of the New York State Assembly from Queens's 4th district
- In office January 1, 1959 – December 31, 1965
- Preceded by: Frank R. McGlynn
- Succeeded by: District abolished

Personal details
- Born: October 19, 1911 Manhattan, New York City, New York
- Died: January 6, 1999 (aged 87)
- Party: Democratic

Jules G. Sabbatino (October 19, 1911 – January 6, 1999) was an American politician who served in the New York State Assembly from 1959 to 1970.
