= Alonzo L. Waters =

American politician (1893–1980)

Member of the New York State Assembly from the Orleans district
- In office January 1, 1949 – December 31, 1965
- Preceded by: John S. Thompson
- Succeeded by: District abolished

Personal details
- Born: September 6, 1893 Ridgeway, New York, U.S.
- Died: March 13, 1980 (aged 86) Medina, New York, U.S.
- Party: Republican

Alonzo L. Waters (September 6, 1893 – March 13, 1980) was an American politician who served in the New York State Assembly from the Orleans district from 1949 to 1965.
