= Russell Selkirk =

American politician

Member of the New York State Assembly from the Schoharie district
- In office January 1, 1959 – December 31, 1965
- Preceded by: David Enders
- Succeeded by: District abolished

Personal details
- Born: October 20, 1905 Selkirk, New York
- Died: September 25, 1993 (aged 87)
- Party: Republican

Russell Selkirk (October 20, 1905 – September 25, 1993) was an American politician who served in the New York State Assembly from the Schoharie district from 1959 to 1965.
