= Louis Kalish =

American politician

Member of the New York State Assembly from the 57th district
- In office January 1, 1966 – March 4, 1966
- Preceded by: District created
- Succeeded by: Harold W. Cohn

Member of the New York State Assembly from King's 7th district
- In office January 1, 1947 – December 31, 1965
- Preceded by: John F. Furey
- Succeeded by: District abolished

Personal details
- Born: July 10, 1897
- Died: March 4, 1966 (aged 68)
- Party: Democratic

Louis Kalish (July 10, 1897 – March 4, 1966) was an American politician who served in the New York State Assembly from 1947 to 1966.
