= Julius Volker =

American politician

Member of the New York State Assembly from Erie's 7th district
- In office January 1, 1945 – December 31, 1965
- Preceded by: Justin C. Morgan
- Succeeded by: District abolished

Personal details
- Born: June 18, 1903 Lancaster, New York
- Died: September 3, 1976 (aged 73) Buffalo, New York
- Party: Republican

Julius Volker (June 18, 1903 – September 3, 1976) was an American politician who served in the New York State Assembly from Erie's 7th district from 1945 to 1965.

He died on September 3, 1976, in Buffalo, New York at age 73.
