= Edwin J. Fehrenbach =

American politician

Member of the New York State Assembly from Nassau's 4th district
- In office January 1, 1957 – December 31, 1965
- Preceded by: John Burns
- Succeeded by: District abolished

Personal details
- Born: March 19, 1919 Brooklyn, New York City, New York
- Died: August 15, 1992 (aged 73)
- Party: Republican

Edwin J. Fehrenbach (March 19, 1919 – August 15, 1992) was an American politician who served in the New York State Assembly from Nassau's 4th district from 1957 to 1965.
