= J. Eugene Goddard =

American politician

Member of the New York State Assembly from Monroe's 1st district
- In office January 1, 1949 – December 31, 1964
- Preceded by: Joseph W. Bentley
- Succeeded by: Harold P. Garnham

Personal details
- Born: April 28, 1901 East Rochester, New York, U.S.
- Died: December 18, 1979 (aged 78) Rochester, New York, U.S.
- Party: Republican

J. Eugene Goddard (April 28, 1901 – December 18, 1979) was an American politician who served in the New York State Assembly from Monroe's 1st district from 1949 to 1964.

He died of a heart attack on December 18, 1979, in Rochester, New York at age 78.
