= P. Boice Esser =

American politician

Member of the New York State Assembly from Westchester's 2nd district
- In office January 1, 1959 – December 31, 1964
- Preceded by: Fred Suthergreen
- Succeeded by: Lawrence A. Cabot

Personal details
- Born: February 23, 1916 Mount Vernon, New York
- Died: July 23, 1974 (aged 58) Hartsdale, New York
- Party: Republican

P. Boice Esser (February 23, 1916 – July 23, 1974) was an American politician who served on the Greenburgh Town Council and in the New York State Assembly from Westchester's 2nd district from 1959 to 1964.

He died on July 23, 1974, in Hartsdale, New York at age 58.
