= Harold L. Peet =

American politician

Member of the New York State Assembly from the Wyoming district
- In office January 1, 1951 – December 31, 1964
- Preceded by: Harold C. Ostertag
- Succeeded by: Frank Walkley

Personal details
- Born: April 19, 1896 Hickox, Pennsylvania, U.S.
- Died: February 20, 1965 (aged 68) Buffalo, New York, U.S.
- Party: Republican

Harold L. Peet (April 19, 1896 – February 20, 1965) was an American politician who served in the New York State Assembly from the Wyoming district from 1951 to 1964.
