= Luigi R. Marano =

American politician

Member of the New York State Assembly from Kings's 12th district
- In office January 1, 1957 – December 31, 1964
- Preceded by: Frank Vaccaro
- Succeeded by: Dominick L. DiCarlo

Personal details
- Born: July 7, 1921 Brooklyn, New York, U.S.
- Died: December 29, 2017 (aged 96) Brooklyn, New York, U.S.
- Party: Republican

Luigi R. Marano (July 7, 1921 – December 29, 2017) was an American politician who served in the New York State Assembly from Kings's 12th district from 1957 to 1964.

He died on December 29, 2017, in Brooklyn, New York City, New York at age 96.
