= Lawrence P. Murphy =

American politician

Member of the New York State Assembly
- In office January 1, 1945 – December 31, 1970
- Preceded by: Ralph Schwartz
- Succeeded by: Brian Sharoff
- Constituency: Kings County's 13th district (1945-1965); 42nd district (1966-1970)

Personal details
- Born: April 1, 1910 Brooklyn, New York City, New York
- Died: August 17, 1975 (aged 65) Queens, New York City, New York
- Party: Democratic

Lawrence P. Murphy (April 1, 1910 – August 17, 1975) was an American politician who served in the New York State Assembly from 1945 to 1970.

He died of a heart attack on August 17, 1975, in Queens, New York City, New York at age 65.

He studied at Fordham College and Fordham Law School.
