= Richard C. Lounsberry =

American politician

Member of the New York State Assembly from the Tioga district
- In office January 1, 1953 – December 31, 1965
- Preceded by: Myron D. Albro
- Succeeded by: District abolished

Personal details
- Born: February 21, 1916 Lounsberry, New York
- Died: January 30, 2000 (aged 83) Sayre, Pennsylvania
- Party: Republican

Richard C. Lounsberry (February 21, 1916 – January 30, 2000) was an American politician who served in the New York State Assembly from the Tioga district from 1953 to 1965.

He died on January 30, 2000, in Sayre, Pennsylvania at age 83.
