= Orin S. Wilcox =

American politician

Member of the New York State Assembly from the Jefferson district
- In office January 1, 1945 – December 31, 1965
- Preceded by: Russell Wright
- Succeeded by: District abolished

Personal details
- Born: September 22, 1898 Alexandria, New York
- Died: March 1986 (aged 87)
- Party: Republican

Orin S. Wilcox (September 22, 1898 – March 1986) was an American politician who served in the New York State Assembly from the Jefferson district from 1945 to 1965.
