= Thomas V. LaFauci =

American politician (1918–2002)

Member of the New York State Assembly from the 33rd district
- In office January 1, 1967 – December 31, 1967
- Preceded by: Jules G. Sabbatino
- Succeeded by: Joseph S. Calabretta

Member of the New York State Assembly from the 34th district
- In office January 1, 1966 – December 31, 1966
- Preceded by: District created
- Succeeded by: Thomas P. Cullen

Member of the New York State Assembly from Queens's 1st district
- In office February 20, 1952 – December 31, 1965
- Preceded by: Alexander Del Giorno
- Succeeded by: District abolished

Personal details
- Born: October 18, 1918 Queens, New York City, U.S.
- Died: July 16, 2002 (aged 83) Queens, New York City, U.S.
- Party: Democratic
- Education: St. John's University School of Law

Thomas V. LaFauci (October 18, 1918 – July 16, 2002) was an American politician from Queens, New York, who served in the New York State Assembly from 1952 to 1967.

== Early life and education ==
LaFauci was born on October 18, 1918, in Queens, New York City. He attended St. John's University School of Law, graduating as a member of the Class of 1942.

== Legislative career ==
LaFauci was elected to the New York State Assembly in a special election held on February 20, 1952, succeeding Alexander Del Giorno in Queens's 1st district. He represented the 1st district until 1965, when redistricting abolished the seat. He then represented the 34th district in 1966 and the 33rd district in 1967.

=== Chairmanship of the Codes Committee ===
In 1967, LaFauci served as chairman of the Assembly Codes Committee. In that role, he presided over a dramatic 90‑minute committee meeting that killed a bill to liberalize New York's abortion law. The committee voted 15 to 3 against reporting the bill to the floor. After the meeting, LaFauci told reporters, "The bill was dead by a good comfortable margin."

=== Subway safety legislation ===
In April 1965, LaFauci sponsored a package of bills aimed at reducing crime in New York City's subways. The proposals included:

- Closed‑circuit television in every subway station with central monitoring
- Communications systems between cars in each train and between trains and stations
- Limiting trains to no more than three cars between 10 p.m. and 6 a.m.

Speaking on the Assembly floor, LaFauci argued that "the mere installation of a closed‑circuit television system in the subways would have the effect of deterring a criminal since he would be reluctant to commit a crime with knowledge that he is in plain view of a television camera." He also referred to past proposals he had advocated, including a curfew making it illegal for anyone under 16 to be out after 11 p.m. unless accompanied by a parent or guardian. "Maybe," he said, "this curfew can be considered a sort of police state tactic, but something has to be done."

== Death ==
LaFauci died on July 16, 2002, in Queens at the age of 83.
