= Joseph R. Corso =

American politician

Member of the New York State Assembly from the 47th district
- In office January 1, 1966 – December 31, 1966
- Preceded by: District created
- Succeeded by: Salvatore J. Grieco

Member of the New York State Assembly from Kings's 20th district
- In office January 1, 1949 – December 31, 1965
- Preceded by: John E. Beck
- Succeeded by: District abolished

Personal details
- Born: September 11, 1908 Brooklyn, New York City, New York
- Died: July 16, 1990 (aged 81) Manhattan, New York City, New York
- Party: Democratic

Joseph R. Corso (September 11, 1908 – July 16, 1990) was an American politician who served in the New York State Assembly from 1949 to 1966.

He died of heart disease on July 16, 1990, in Manhattan, New York City, New York at age 81.
