= 175th New York State Legislature =

New York state legislative session

←	174th	176th	→
- New York State Capitol (2009)

Overview
- Legislative body: New York State Legislature
- Jurisdiction: New York, United States
- Term: January 1 – December 31, 1965

Senate
- Members: 58
- President: Lt. Gov. Malcolm Wilson (R)
- Temporary President: Joseph Zaretzki (D)
- Party control: Democratic (33–25)

Assembly
- Members: 150
- Speaker: Anthony J. Travia (D)
- Party control: Democratic (88–62)

Sessions
- 1st: January 6 – June 23, 1965

The 175th New York State Legislature, consisting of the New York State Senate and the New York State Assembly, met from January 6 to June 23, 1965, during the seventh year of Nelson Rockefeller's governorship, in Albany.

== Background ==
Under the provisions of the New York Constitution of 1938, re-apportioned in 1953, 58 Senators and 150 assembly members were elected in single-seat districts for two-year terms. The senatorial districts consisted either of one or more entire counties; or a contiguous area within a single county. The counties which were divided into more than one senatorial district were Kings (nine districts), New York (six), Queens (five), Bronx (four), Erie (three), Nassau (three), Westchester (three), Monroe (two) and Onondaga (two). The Assembly districts consisted either of a single entire county (except Hamilton Co.), or of contiguous area within one county.

In 1964, the U.S. Supreme Court handed down several decisions establishing that State legislatures should follow the One man, one vote rule to apportion their election districts. A special Federal Statutory Court declared the New York apportionment formulae for both the State Senate and the State Assembly unconstitutional, and the State Legislature was ordered to re-apportion the seats by April 1, 1965. The court also ruled that the 1964 legislative election should be held under the 1954 apportionment, but those elected could serve only for one year (in 1965), and an election under the new apportionment should be held in November 1965. Senators John H. Hughes and Lawrence M. Rulison (both Rep.) questioned the authority of the federal court to shorten the term of the 1964 electees, alleging excessive costs for the additional election in an off-year.

At this time there were two major political parties: the Democratic Party and the Republican Party. The Liberal Party, the Conservative Party, the Socialist Labor Party, and the Socialist Workers Party also nominated tickets. At the 1964 New York state election on November 3, Democratic majorities were elected to both the State Senate and the State Assembly for the session of 1965.

The lame-duck Legislature of 1964 met for a special session at the State Capitol in Albany from December 15 to 31, 1964, to re-apportion the legislative districts for the election in November 1965, gerrymandering the districts according to the wishes of the Republican majority before the Democrats would take over the Legislature in January. The number of seats in the State Senate was increased to 65, and the number of seats in the Assembly to 165. County representation was abandoned in favor of population-proportional districts which could lie across county lines, and the new Assembly districts were numbered from 1 to 165.

== Elections ==
The 1964 New York state election, was held on November 3. The only statewide elective office up for election was a U.S. Senator from New York. Democrat Robert F. Kennedy defeated the Republican incumbent Kenneth B. Keating. The approximate party strength at this election, as expressed by the vote for U.S. Senator, was: Democrats 3,540,000; Republicans 3,104,000; Liberals 285,000; Conservatives 212,000; Socialist Labor 7,000; and Socialist Workers 4,000.

3 of the 4 women members of the previous legislature State Senator Constance Baker Motley, a lawyer of Manhattan; and Assembly Members Constance E. Cook (Republican), a lawyer of Ithaca, and Aileen B. Ryan (Democrat), a former school teacher of the Bronx—were re-elected. Shirley Chisholm (Democrat), a preschool teacher of Brooklyn; and Dorothy H. Rose (Democrat), a high-school teacher and librarian of Angola, were also elected to the Assembly.

== Sessions ==
The Legislature met for the regular session (the 188th) at the State Capitol in Albany on January 6, 1965; and adjourned on June 23.

Due to the split of the Democratic majorities in both Houses into followers of Mayor Robert F. Wagner Jr. and U.S. Senator Robert F. Kennedy, neither House could be organized, and a month of deadlock ensued.

On February 1, the United States Supreme Court confirmed the Federal Statutory Court's order to elect a new New York Legislature in November 1965.

On February 3, Joseph Zaretzki (Dem.) was elected Temporary President of the State Senate with the votes of the Wagner Democrats and the Republicans.

On February 4, Anthony J. Travia (Dem.) was elected Speaker.

On April 14, the New York Court of Appeals declared the apportionment of December 1964 as unconstitutional, citing that the New York Constitution provides expressly that the Assembly shall have 150 seats, not 165 as were apportioned. The court also held that, although the constitutional State Senate apportionment formula provides for additional seats, the increase from 58 to 65 was unwarranted.

On May 10, the Federal Statutory Court ordered that the election on November 2, 1965, be held under the December 1964 apportionment, and that the Legislature thus elected re-apportion the seats again by February 1, 1966.

On August 24, the Federal Statutory Court clarified that, if the Governor and Legislature should not have enacted a new apportionment by February 1, 1966, then the Court would draft a new apportionment for the next election.

On October 11, the U.S. Supreme Court dismissed four appeals against the ruling of the Federal Statutory Court, and upheld the election of a new New York Legislature on November 2.

== State Senate ==
=== Districts ===
- 1st District: Suffolk County
- 2nd, 3rd and 4th District: Parts of Nassau County
- 5th, 6th, 7th, 8th and 9th District: Parts of Queens County, i.e. the Borough of Queens
- 10th, 11th, 12th, 13th, 14th, 15th, 16th, 17th and 18th District: Parts of Kings County, i.e. the Borough of Brooklyn
- 19th District: Richmond County, i.e. the Borough of Richmond (now the Borough of Staten Island)
- 20th, 21st, 22nd, 23rd, 24th and 25th District: Parts of New York County, i.e. the Borough of Manhattan
- 26th, 27th, 28th and 29th District: Parts of Bronx County, i.e. the Borough of the Bronx
- 30th, 31st and 32nd District: Parts of Westchester County
- 33rd District: Orange and Rockland counties
- 34th District: Delaware, Greene, Sullivan and Ulster counties
- 35th District: Columbia, Dutchess and Putnam counties
- 36th District: Albany County
- 37th District: Rensselaer and Washington counties
- 38th District: Schenectady and Schoharie counties
- 39th District: Essex, Saratoga and Warren counties
- 40th District: Clinton, Franklin and St. Lawrence counties
- 41st District: Fulton, Hamilton, Herkimer and Montgomery counties
- 42nd District: Oneida County
- 43rd District: Jefferson, Lewis and Oswego
- 44th and 45th District: Parts of Onondaga County
- 46th District: Chenango, Cortland, Madison and Otsego counties
- 47th District: Broome County
- 48th District: Cayuga, Tioga and Tompkins counties
- 49th District: Chemung and Steuben counties
- 50th District: Ontario, Schuyler, Seneca, Wayne and Yates counties
- 51st and 52nd District: Parts of Monroe County
- 53rd District: Allegany, Genesee, Livingston, Orleans and Wyoming counties
- 54th District: Niagara County
- 55th, 56th and 57th District: Parts of Erie County
- 58th District: Cattaraugus and Chautauqua counties

=== Senators ===
The asterisk (*) denotes members of the previous Legislature who continued in office as members of this Legislature. Bernard G. Gordon, Robert Watson Pomeroy, William S. Calli and Kenneth R. Willard changed from the Assembly to the Senate.

Note: For brevity, the chairmanships omit the words "...the Committee on (the)..."

District	Senator	Party	Notes
1st	Elisha T. Barrett*	Republican	
2nd	Norman F. Lent	Republican	
3rd	Henry M. Curran*	Republican	
4th	Edward J. Speno*	Republican	
5th	Jack E. Bronston*	Democrat	Chairman of Affairs of Cities
6th	Irving Mosberg*	Democrat	Chairman of General Laws
7th	Seymour R. Thaler*	Democrat	Chairman of Public Health
8th	Thomas A. Duffy*	Democrat	Chairman of Codes
9th	Thomas J. Mackell*	Democrat	Chairman of Affairs of the City of New York
10th	Simon J. Liebowitz*	Democrat	Chairman of Motor Vehicles
11th	William C. Thompson	Democrat	Chairman of National Defense
12th	Jeremiah B. Bloom*	Democrat	Chairman of Banks
13th	Guy James Mangano*	Democrat	Chairman of Corporations
14th	William T. Conklin*	Republican	
15th	Irwin Brownstein*	Democrat	Chairman of Commerce and Navigation
16th	William Rosenblatt*	Democrat	Chairman of Judiciary
17th	Samuel L. Greenberg*	Democrat	Chairman of Finance
18th	Edward S. Lentol*	Democrat	Chairman of Civil Service
19th	John J. Marchi*	Republican	
20th	Frederic S. Berman	Democrat	
21st	Constance Baker Motley*	Democrat	Chairwoman of Penal Institutions; on February 23, 1965, elected Borough President of Manhattan
22nd	Jerome L. Wilson*	Democrat	Chairman of Public Welfare
23rd	Joseph Zaretzki*	Democrat	elected Temporary President; Chairman of Rules
24th	Paul P. E. Bookson	Democrat	Chairman of Agriculture
25th	Manfred Ohrenstein*	Democrat	Chairman of Mental Hygiene
26th	Harry Kraf*	Democrat	Chairman of Taxation
27th	Ivan Warner*	Democrat	Chairman of Education
28th	Abraham Bernstein*	Democrat	Chairman of Excise
29th	Joseph E. Marine*	Democrat	Chairman of Public Service
30th	Max Berking	Democrat	
31st	Bernard G. Gordon*	Republican	
32nd	Royden A. Letsen	Democrat	Chairman of Highways
33rd	D. Clinton Dominick III*	Republican	
34th	E. Ogden Bush*	Republican	
35th	Robert Watson Pomeroy*	Republican	
36th	Julian B. Erway*	Democrat	Chairman of Insurance
37th	F. Warren Travers	Democrat	Chairman of Internal Affairs
38th	Owen M. Begley*	Democrat	Chairman of Conservation
39th	Nathan Proller	Republican	
40th	John E. Quinn	Democrat	
41st	Dalwin J. Niles	Republican	
42nd	William S. Calli*	Republican	
43rd	Hugh Douglas Barclay	Republican	
44th	Earl E. Boyle	Democrat	
45th	John H. Hughes*	Republican	
46th	Leighton A. Hope*	Republican	
47th	Warren M. Anderson*	Republican	
48th	George R. Metcalf*	Republican	
49th	William T. Smith	Republican	
50th	Bryce Barden	Republican	
51st	Frank E. Van Lare*	Republican	
52nd	Thomas Laverne*	Republican	
53rd	Kenneth R. Willard*	Republican	
54th	Earl W. Brydges*	Republican	Minority Leader
55th	John H. Doerr	Democrat	
56th	Frank J. Glinski*	Democrat	Chairman of Labor
57th	Bertrand H. Hoak	Democrat	Chairman of Affairs of Villages
58th	Jeremiah J. Moriarty*	Republican	

=== Employees ===
- Secretary:
  - Albert J. Abrams (Rep.), holding over until February 9
  - George H. Van Lengen (Dem.), from February 9
- Sergeant-at-Arms: John F. O'Hagen, from February 9

== State Assembly ==
=== Assembly members ===
The asterisk (*) denotes members of the previous Legislature who continued in office as members of this Legislature. Walter E. Cooke changed from the Senate to the Assembly.

Note: For brevity, the chairmanships omit the words "...the Committee on (the)..."

District		Assembly members	Party	Notes
Albany	1st	Frank P. Cox*	Dem./Lib.	Chairman of Public Printing
Albany	2nd	Harvey M. Lifset*	Dem./Lib.	Chairman of Cities
Allegany		Don O. Cummings*	Republican	
Bronx	1st	Donald J. Sullivan*	Democrat	Chairman of Revision
Bronx	2nd	Seymour Posner	Democrat	
Bronx	3rd	Jerome Schutzer*	Democrat	
Bronx	4th	Eugene Rodriguez	Democrat	
Bronx	5th	Melville E. Abrams*	Democrat	Chairman of Social Welfare and Relief
Bronx	6th	Murray Lewinter*	Democrat	
Bronx	7th	John T. Satriale*	Democrat	Chairman of Ways and Means
Bronx	8th	Alexander Chananau*	Democrat	Chairman of Canals and Waterways
Bronx	9th	Burton Hecht*	Democrat	
Bronx	10th	Ferdinand J. Mondello*	Democrat	
Bronx	11th	Aileen B. Ryan*	Democrat	Chairwoman of Charitable and Religious Societies; on November 2, 1965, elected to the New York City Council
Bronx	12th	Fred W. Eggert Jr.*	Democrat	Chairman of Aviation
Broome	1st	Daniel S. Dickinson Jr.*	Rep./Cons.	
Broome	2nd	George L. Ingalls*	Republican	Minority Leader
Cattaraugus		James F. Hastings*	Republican	
Cayuga		George M. Michaels*	Democrat	Chairman of Affairs of Villages
Chautauqua		A. Bruce Manley*	Republican	
Chemung		L. Richard Marshall*	Republican	
Chenango		Guy L. Marvin*	Republican	
Clinton		Louis Wolfe	Democrat	
Columbia		Willard C. Drumm*	Republican	
Cortland		Louis H. Folmer*	Republican	
Delaware		Edwyn E. Mason*	Republican	
Dutchess		Victor C. Waryas	Democrat	
Erie	1st	Stephen R. Greco*	Democrat	Chairman of Pensions
Erie	2nd	F. James Kane Jr.	Democrat	
Erie	3rd	Arthur Hardwick Jr.	Democrat	
Erie	4th	Francis J. Griffin*	Democrat	
Erie	5th	John B. Lis*	Democrat	Chairman of Motor Vehicles
Erie	6th	Albert J. Hausbeck*	Democrat	
Erie	7th	Julius Volker*	Republican	
Erie	8th	Dorothy H. Rose	Democrat	
Essex		Grant W. Johnson*	Republican	
Franklin		James Edward LaPan	Democrat	
Fulton and Hamilton		Glenn H. Harris	Republican	
Genesee		James A. Carmichael Jr.	Democrat	
Greene		Clarence D. Lane*	Republican	
Herkimer		Donald J. Mitchell	Republican	
Jefferson		Orin S. Wilcox*	Republican	
Kings	1st	Max M. Turshen*	Democrat	Chairman of Judiciary
Kings	2nd	Noah Goldstein*	Democrat	
Kings	3rd	Joseph J. Dowd*	Democrat	
Kings	4th	Harold W. Cohn*	Democrat	Chairman of Internal Affairs
Kings	5th	Leonard E. Yoswein*	Democrat	
Kings	6th	Bertram L. Baker*	Democrat	Chairman of Public Education
Kings	7th	Louis Kalish*	Democrat	Chairman of Insurance
Kings	8th	William J. Ferrall*	Democrat	
Kings	9th	Robert F. Kelly*	Republican	
Kings	10th	Walter E. Cooke*	Democrat	
Kings	11th	George A. Cincotta*	Democrat	Chairman of Excise
Kings	12th	Dominick L. DiCarlo	Republican	
Kings	13th	Lawrence P. Murphy*	Democrat	Chairman of Mortgage and Real Estate
Kings	14th	Edward A. Kurmel*	Democrat	
Kings	15th	Alfred A. Lama*	Democrat	Chairman of Banks
Kings	16th	Salvatore J. Grieco*	Democrat	
Kings	17th	Shirley Chisholm	Democrat	
Kings	18th	Stanley Steingut*	Democrat	Chairman of General Laws
Kings	19th	Joseph Kottler*	Democrat	Chairman of Penal Institutions
Kings	20th	Joseph R. Corso*	Democrat	Chairman of Codes
Kings	21st	Bertram L. Podell*	Democrat	Chairman of Local Finance
Kings	22nd	Anthony J. Travia*	Democrat	elected Speaker; Chairman of Rules
Lewis		Lawrence C. Byrnes	Republican	
Livingston		James L. Emery	Republican	
Madison		Harold I. Tyler*	Republican	
Monroe	1st	Harold P. Garnham	Democrat	
Monroe	2nd	S. William Rosenberg*	Republican	
Monroe	3rd	James E. Powers	Democrat	
Monroe	4th	Charles F. Stockmeister*	Democrat	Chairman of Conservation
Montgomery		Donald A. Campbell*	Republican	
Nassau	1st	Francis T. Purcell	Republican	on June 18, 1965, appointed as Supervisor of Hempstead
Nassau	2nd	Jerome R. McDougal Jr.	Democrat	
Nassau	3rd	John E. Kingston*	Republican	
Nassau	4th	Edwin J. Fehrenbach*	Republican	
Nassau	5th	Herbert Sachs	Democrat	
Nassau	6th	John S. Thorp Jr.	Democrat	
New York	1st	William F. Passannante*	Democrat	Chairman of Claims
New York	2nd	Louis DeSalvio*	Democrat	Chairman of Military Affairs
New York	3rd	Jerome Kretchmer*	Democrat	
New York	4th	Jerome W. Marks*	Democrat	
New York	5th	Albert H. Blumenthal*	Democrat	
New York	6th	Paul J. Curran*	Republican	
New York	7th	Daniel M. Kelly*	Democrat	Chairman of Taxation
New York	8th	John M. Burns*	Republican	
New York	9th	S. William Green	Republican	
New York	10th	Carlos M. Rios*	Democrat	
New York	11th	Percy E. Sutton	Democrat	
New York	12th	Mark T. Southall*	Democrat	
New York	13th	Orest V. Maresca*	Democrat	Chairman of Affairs of the City of New York
New York	14th	Jose Ramos-Lopez*	Democrat	Chairman of Printed and Engrossed Bills
New York	15th	John J. Walsh*	Democrat	Chairman of Public Institutions
New York	16th	Frank G. Rossetti*	Democrat	Chairman of Labor and Industries
Niagara	1st	Gregory J. Pope	Democrat	
Niagara	2nd	Donald J. O'Hara	Democrat	
Oneida	1st	Paul A. Worlock*	Democrat	Democratic Whip; Chairman of Agriculture
Oneida	2nd	John B. Cosgrove	Democrat	
Onondaga	1st	James J. Barry	Democrat	
Onondaga	2nd	John H. Terry*	Republican	
Onondaga	3rd	Philip R. Chase*	Republican	
Ontario		Frederick L. Warder*	Republican	
Orange	1st	Daniel Becker*	Republican	
Orange	2nd	Jack A. Schlosser	Democrat	
Orleans		Alonzo L. Waters*	Republican	
Oswego		Edward F. Crawford*	Republican	
Otsego		Scott E. Greene	Republican	
Putnam		Willis H. Stephens*	Republican	
Queens	1st	Thomas V. LaFauci*	Dem./Lib.	Chairman of Civil Service
Queens	2nd	Thomas P. Cullen	Dem./Lib.	
Queens	3rd	Robert E. Whelan*	Democrat	
Queens	4th	Jules G. Sabbatino*	Dem./Lib.	Chairman of Commerce and Navigation
Queens	5th	Martin M. Psaty*	Dem./Lib.	
Queens	6th	Michael G. Rice*	Democrat	Chairman of Public Health
Queens	7th	Moses M. Weinstein*	Dem./Lib.	Majority Leader
Queens	8th	Michael J. Capanegro*	Dem./Lib.	
Queens	9th	Fred W. Preller*	Rep./Cons.	
Queens	10th	Martin Rodell	Dem./Lib.	
Queens	11th	Kenneth N. Browne	Dem./Lib.	
Queens	12th	J. Lewis Fox*	Dem./Lib.	Chairman of Public Service
Queens	13th	Frederick D. Schmidt	Dem./Cons.	
Rensselaer		James A. Lombard	Democrat	
Richmond	1st	Edward J. Amann Jr.*	Republican	
Richmond	2nd	Lucio F. Russo*	Republican	
Rockland		Joseph T. St. Lawrence	Dem./Lib.	
St. Lawrence		Verner M. Ingram*	Republican	
Saratoga		Stanley L. Van Rensselaer*	Republican	
Schenectady		John F. Kirvin	Democrat	
Schoharie		Russell Selkirk*	Republican	
Schuyler		John P. Callanan	Republican	
Seneca		Theodore D. Day*	Republican	
Steuben		Charles D. Henderson*	Republican	
Suffolk	1st	Perry B. Duryea Jr.*	Republican	
Suffolk	2nd	Prescott B. Huntington*	Republican	
Suffolk	3rd	John G. McCarthy*	Republican	
Sullivan		Hyman E. Mintz*	Republican	
Tioga		Richard C. Lounsberry*	Republican	
Tompkins		Constance E. Cook*	Republican	
Ulster		Kenneth L. Wilson*	Republican	
Warren		Richard J. Bartlett*	Republican	
Washington		Lawrence E. Corbett Jr.	Republican	
Wayne		Joseph C. Finley*	Republican	
Westchester	1st	Thomas J. McInerney	Democrat	
Westchester	2nd	Lawrence A. Cabot	Dem./Lib.	
Westchester	3rd	George E. Van Cott*	Republican	
Westchester	4th	Anthony B. Gioffre*	Republican	
Westchester	5th	John J. S. Mead*	Republican	
Westchester	6th	Richard A. Cerosky	Republican	
Wyoming		Frank Walkley	Republican	
Yates		Paul R. Taylor*	Republican	

=== Employees ===
- Clerk:
  - Ansley B. Borkowski (Rep.), holding over until February 9
  - John T. McKennan (Dem.), from February 9
- Sergeant-at-Arms:
  - Raymond J. Roche (Rep.), until March 2
  - William A. Wardlaw (Dem.), from March 2
- Assistant Sergeant-at-Arms: Raymond J. Roche, from March 2

== Sources ==
- Complete List of Names, Addresses Of All Members Of '65 State Legislature in the Civil Service Leader (Vol. XXVI, No. 18, pg. 8f; issue of January 5, 1965)
- Legislature Committee Chairman Named in the Civil Service Leader (Vol. XXVI, No. 26, pg. 8; issue of March 2, 1965)
- Members of the New York Senate (1960s) at Political Graveyard
- Members of the New York Assembly (1960s) at Political Graveyard
