= Senator Luther =

Senator Luther may refer to:

- Bill Luther (born 1945), Minnesota State Senate
- Sidney A. von Luther (1925–1985), New York State Senate
