= 171st New York State Legislature =

New York state legislative session

←	170th	172nd	→
- New York State Capitol (2009)

Overview
- Legislative body: New York State Legislature
- Jurisdiction: New York, United States
- Term: January 1, 1957 – December 31, 1958

Senate
- Members: 58
- President: Lt. Gov. George B. DeLuca (D)
- Temporary President: Walter J. Mahoney (R)
- Party control: Republican (1957: 38–20) (1958: 37–21)

Assembly
- Members: 150
- Speaker: Oswald D. Heck (R)
- Party control: Republican

Sessions
- 1st: January 9 – March 30, 1957
- 2nd: June 10 – 13, 1957
- 3rd: January 8 – March 26, 1958

The 171st New York State Legislature, consisting of the New York State Senate and the New York State Assembly, met from January 9, 1957, to March 26, 1958, during the third and fourth years of W. Averell Harriman's governorship, in Albany.

== Background ==
Under the provisions of the New York Constitution of 1938, re-apportioned in 1953, 58 Senators and 150 assemblymen were elected in single-seat districts for two-year terms. The senatorial districts consisted either of one or more entire counties; or a contiguous area within a single county. The counties which were divided into more than one senatorial district were Kings (nine districts), New York (six), Queens (five), Bronx (four), Erie (three), Nassau (three), Westchester (three), Monroe (two) and Onondaga (two). The Assembly districts consisted either of a single entire county (except Hamilton Co.), or of contiguous area within one county.

At this time there were two major political parties: the Republican Party and the Democratic Party. The Liberal Party also nominated tickets.

== Elections ==
The 1956 New York state election was held on November 6. The only statewide elective office up for election was a U.S. Senator from New York. The Republican Attorney General Jacob K. Javits defeated the Democratic/Liberal Mayor of New York Robert F. Wagner Jr. The approximate party strength at this election, as expressed by the vote for U.S. Senator, was: Republicans 3,724,000; Democrats 2,965,000; and Liberals 301,000.

Five of the six women members of the previous legislature—Assemblywomen Bessie A. Buchanan (Dem.), a retired musical actress and dancer of Harlem; Janet Hill Gordon (Rep.), a lawyer of Norwich; Frances K. Marlatt (Rep.), a lawyer of Mount Vernon; Genesta M. Strong (Rep.), of Plandome Heights; and Mildred F. Taylor (Rep.), a coal dealer of Lyons—were re-elected.

The 1957 New York state election was held on November 5. No statewide elective offices were up for election. Three vacancies in the State Senate and three vacancies in the Assembly were filled.

== Sessions ==
The Legislature met for the first regular session (the 180th) at the State Capitol in Albany on January 9, 1957; and adjourned on March 30.

Oswald D. Heck (Rep.) was re-elected Speaker.

Walter J. Mahoney (Rep.) was re-elected Temporary President of the State Senate.

The Legislature met for a special session at the State Capitol in Albany on June 10, 1957; and adjourned on June 13. This session was called, among other things, to consider legislation concerning worker benefits and telephone rates.

The Legislature met for the second regular session (the 181st) at the State Capitol in Albany on January 8, 1958; and adjourned on March 26.

== State Senate ==
=== Districts ===
- 1st District: Suffolk County
- 2nd, 3rd and 4th District: Parts of Nassau County
- 5th, 6th, 7th, 8th and 9th District: Parts of Queens County, i.e. the Borough of Queens
- 10th, 11th, 12th, 13th, 14th, 15th, 16th, 17th and 18th District: Parts of Kings County, i.e. the Borough of Brooklyn
- 19th District: Richmond County, i.e. the Borough of Richmond (now the Borough of Staten Island)
- 20th, 21st, 22nd, 23rd, 24th and 25th District: Parts of New York County, i.e. the Borough of Manhattan
- 26th, 27th, 28th and 29th District: Parts of Bronx County, i.e. the Borough of the Bronx
- 30th, 31st and 32nd District: Parts of Westchester County
- 33rd District: Orange and Rockland counties
- 34th District: Delaware, Greene, Sullivan and Ulster counties
- 35th District: Columbia, Dutchess and Putnam counties
- 36th District: Albany County
- 37th District: Rensselaer and Washington counties
- 38th District: Schenectady and Schoharie counties
- 39th District: Essex, Saratoga and Warren counties
- 40th District: Clinton, Franklin and St. Lawrence counties
- 41st District: Fulton, Hamilton, Herkimer and Montgomery counties
- 42nd District: Oneida County
- 43rd District: Jefferson, Lewis and Oswego
- 44th and 45th District: Parts of Onondaga County
- 46th District: Chenango, Cortland, Madison and Otsego counties
- 47th District: Broome County
- 48th District: Cayuga, Tioga and Tompkins counties
- 49th District: Chemung and Steuben counties
- 50th District: Ontario, Schuyler, Seneca, Wayne and Yates counties
- 51st and 52nd District: Parts of Monroe County
- 53rd District: Allegany, Genesee, Livingston, Orleans and Wyoming counties
- 54th District: Niagara County
- 55th, 56th and 57th District: Parts of Erie County
- 58th District: Cattaraugus and Chautauqua counties

=== Senators ===
The asterisk (*) denotes members of the previous Legislature who continued in office as members of this Legislature. Elisha T. Barrett and Thomas A. Duffy changed from the Assembly to the Senate at the beginning of this Legislature. Assemblymen John H. Farrell and A. Gould Hatch were elected to fill vacancies in the Senate.

Note: For brevity, the chairmanships omit the words "...the Committee on (the)..."

District	Senator	Party	Notes
1st	Elisha T. Barrett*	Republican	
2nd	Daniel G. Albert*	Republican	
3rd	William S. Hults Jr.*	Republican	
4th	Edward J. Speno*	Republican	
5th	Walter G. McGahan*	Republican	
6th	James J. Crisona*	Dem./Lib.	on November 5, 1957, elected Borough President of Queens
6th	Irving Mosberg	Dem./Lib.	on January 14, 1958, elected to fill vacancy
7th	Irwin Pakula	Republican	
8th	Thomas A. Duffy	Dem./Lib.	
9th	Thomas J. Mackell*	Dem./Lib.	
10th	Herbert I. Sorin*	Dem./Lib.	
11th	Walter E. Cooke*	Dem./Lib.	
12th	Fred G. Moritt*	Dem./Lib.	resigned on September 13, 1957, to run for the Municipal Court
12th	Jeremiah B. Bloom	Dem./Lib.	on November 5, 1957, elected to fill vacancy
13th	Thomas J. Cuite*	Dem./Lib.	
14th	William T. Conklin	Republican	
15th	Frank J. Pino*	Dem./Lib.	
16th	William Rosenblatt*	Dem./Lib.	
17th	Samuel L. Greenberg*	Dem./Lib.	
18th	Harry Gittleson*	Dem./Lib.	
19th	John J. Marchi	Republican	
20th	MacNeil Mitchell*	Republican	
21st	James Lopez Watson*	Dem./Lib.	
22nd	John P. Morrissey	Dem./Lib.	
23rd	Joseph Zaretzki*	Dem./Lib.	Minority Leader
24th	Joseph R. Marro*	Dem./Lib.	
25th	vacant	Francis J. Mahoney (D) was re-elected, but died on December 23, 1956	
25th	John H. Farrell*	Dem./Lib.	on February 14, 1957, elected to fill vacancy
26th	Harry Kraf*	Democrat	
27th	Jacob H. Gilbert*	Democrat	
28th	Nathaniel T. Helman*	Democrat	
29th	Joseph F. Periconi	Republican	
30th	Frank S. McCullough*	Republican	
31st	Pliny W. Williamson*	Republican	Chairman of Judiciary; died on October 21, 1958
32nd	William F. Condon*	Republican	
33rd	Thomas C. Desmond*	Republican	
34th	E. Ogden Bush	Republican	
35th	Ernest I. Hatfield*	Republican	
36th	Peter J. Dalessandro*	Dem./Lib.	resigned on July 10, 1957, to become secretary to Joseph Zaretzki
36th	Julian B. Erway	Dem./Lib.	on November 5, 1957, elected to fill vacancy
37th	Henry Neddo*	Republican	died on January 11, 1957
37th	Albert Berkowitz	Republican	on February 14, 1957, elected to fill vacancy
38th	Thomas F. Campbell*	Republican	died on March 7, 1957
38th	Owen M. Begley	Dem./Lib.	on November 5, 1957, elected to fill vacancy
39th	Gilbert T. Seelye*	Republican	
40th	Robert C. McEwen*	Republican	
41st	Walter Van Wiggeren*	Republican	
42nd	Fred J. Rath*	Republican	
43rd	Henry A. Wise*	Republican	
44th	Searles G. Shultz*	Republican	
45th	John H. Hughes*	Republican	
46th	Wheeler Milmoe*	Republican	
47th	Warren M. Anderson*	Republican	
48th	George R. Metcalf*	Republican	
49th	Harry K. Morton*	Republican	
50th	Dutton Peterson*	Republican	
51st	Frank E. Van Lare*	Republican	
52nd	vacant	George T. Manning (R) was re-elected but died on December 1, 1956	
52nd	A. Gould Hatch*	Republican	on February 14, 1957, elected to fill vacancy
53rd	Austin W. Erwin*	Republican	Chairman of Finance
54th	Earl W. Brydges*	Republican	
55th	Walter J. Mahoney*	Republican	re-elected Temporary President
56th	Stanley J. Bauer*	Republican	
57th	John H. Cooke*	Republican	
58th	George H. Pierce*	Republican	

=== Employees ===
- Secretary: William S. King

== State Assembly ==
=== Assemblymen ===
Note: For brevity, the chairmanships omit the words "...the Committee on (the)..."

District		Assemblymen	Party	Notes
Albany	1st	Edwin Corning Jr.*	Dem./Lib.	
Albany	2nd	Harvey M. Lifset	Dem./Lib.	
Allegany		William H. MacKenzie*	Republican	Chairman of Ways and Means
Bronx	1st	Bernard C. McDonnell*	Democrat	
Bronx	2nd	Sidney H. Asch*	Democrat	
Bronx	3rd	Moses J. Epstein	Democrat	
Bronx	4th	Felipe N. Torres*	Democrat	
Bronx	5th	Melville E. Abrams*	Democrat	
Bronx	6th	Walter H. Gladwin*	Democrat	on October 29, 1957, appointed as a City Magistrate
Bronx	6th	Ivan Warner	Democrat	elected on January 14, 1958, to fill vacancy
Bronx	7th	John T. Satriale*	Democrat	
Bronx	8th	Mitchell J. Sherwin*	Democrat	on December 13, 1957, appointed as a City Magistrate
Bronx	8th	Alexander Chananau	Democrat	elected on January 14, 1958, to fill vacancy
Bronx	9th	William Kapelman*	Democrat	
Bronx	10th	George W. Harrington	Republican	
Bronx	11th	Thomas E. Ferrandina	Republican	
Bronx	12th	Parnell J. T. Callahan	Republican	
Broome	1st	Daniel S. Dickinson Jr.*	Republican	
Broome	2nd	George L. Ingalls*	Republican	
Cattaraugus		Leo P. Noonan*	Republican	
Cayuga		Charles A. Cusick*	Republican	
Chautauqua		A. Bruce Manley*	Republican	
Chemung		Harry J. Tifft*	Republican	
Chenango		Janet Hill Gordon*	Republican	
Clinton		Robert J. Feinberg	Republican	
Columbia		Willard C. Drumm*	Republican	
Cortland		Louis H. Folmer*	Republican	
Delaware		Edwyn E. Mason*	Republican	
Dutchess		Robert Watson Pomeroy*	Republican	
Erie	1st	Thomas J. Runfola*	Republican	
Erie	2nd	William E. Adams	Republican	
Erie	3rd	William J. Butler*	Republican	
Erie	4th	Frank J. Caffery*	Dem./Lib.	
Erie	5th	John B. Lis*	Dem./Lib.	
Erie	6th	George F. Dannebrock*	Republican	
Erie	7th	Julius Volker*	Republican	
Erie	8th	William Sadler*	Republican	
Essex		Grant W. Johnson*	Republican	
Franklin		Robert G. Main*	Republican	
Fulton and Hamilton		Joseph R. Younglove*	Republican	
Genesee		John E. Johnson*	Republican	
Greene		William E. Brady*	Republican	
Herkimer		Leo A. Lawrence*	Republican	
Jefferson		Orin S. Wilcox*	Rep./Lib.	
Kings	1st	Max M. Turshen*	Dem./Lib.	
Kings	2nd	Samuel Bonom*	Democrat	
Kings	3rd	Harry J. Donnelly	Republican	
Kings	4th	Bernard Austin*	Dem./Lib.	
Kings	5th	John A. Monteleone*	Dem./Lib.	
Kings	6th	Bertram L. Baker*	Dem./Lib.	
Kings	7th	Louis Kalish*	Dem./Lib.	
Kings	8th	Frank Composto*	Dem./Lib.	
Kings	9th	Frank J. McMullen*	Republican	
Kings	10th	John J. Ryan*	Dem./Lib.	
Kings	11th	Eugene F. Bannigan*	Dem./Lib.	Minority Leader; died on July 4, 1958
Kings	12th	Luigi R. Marano	Republican	
Kings	13th	Lawrence P. Murphy*	Dem./Lib.	
Kings	14th	Edward S. Lentol*	Dem./Lib.	
Kings	15th	Alfred A. Lama*	Dem./Lib.	
Kings	16th	Bernard Haber*	Democrat	
Kings	17th	Samuel I. Berman*	Dem./Lib.	
Kings	18th	Stanley Steingut*	Dem./Lib.	
Kings	19th	Frank S. Samansky*	Democrat	
Kings	20th	Joseph R. Corso*	Dem./Lib.	
Kings	21st	Bertram L. Podell*	Dem./Lib.	
Kings	22nd	Anthony J. Travia*	Dem./Lib.	
Lewis		Benjamin H. Demo*	Republican	
Livingston		Kenneth R. Willard	Republican	
Madison		Harold I. Tyler*	Republican	
Monroe	1st	J. Eugene Goddard*	Republican	
Monroe	2nd	A. Gould Hatch*	Rep./Lib.	resigned on February 27, 1957, after election to the State Senate
Monroe	2nd	John J. Conway Jr.	Republican	on November 5, 1957, elected to fill vacancy
Monroe	3rd	Paul B. Hanks Jr.*	Rep./Lib.	
Monroe	4th	Thomas F. Riley*	Republican	
Montgomery		Donald A. Campbell*	Republican	
Nassau	1st	Anthony Barbiero*	Republican	
Nassau	2nd	Joseph F. Carlino*	Republican	Majority Leader
Nassau	3rd	Genesta M. Strong*	Republican	
Nassau	4th	John J. Burns*	Republican	resigned on September 13, 1957, to run for Supervisor of Oyster Bay
Nassau	4th	Edwin J. Fehrenbach	Republican	on November 5, 1957, elected to fill vacancy
Nassau	5th	Francis P. McCloskey*	Republican	
Nassau	6th	Palmer D. Farrington*	Republican	
New York	1st	William F. Passannante*	Dem./Lib.	
New York	2nd	Louis DeSalvio*	Democrat	
New York	3rd	John H. Farrell*	Dem./Lib.	resigned on February 27, 1957, after election to the State Senate
New York	3rd	Francis W. Doheny	Dem./Lib.	on November 5, 1957, elected to fill vacancy
New York	4th	Samuel A. Spiegel	Democrat	
New York	5th	Bentley Kassal	Dem./Lib.	
New York	6th	Joseph J. Weiser*	Dem./Lib.	
New York	7th	Daniel M. Kelly*	Dem./Lib.	
New York	8th	Archibald Douglas Jr.*	Republican	
New York	9th	John R. Brook*	Republican	
New York	10th	Herman Katz*	Dem./Lib.	
New York	11th	James C. Thomas*	Dem./Lib.	died on August 13, 1958
New York	12th	Bessie A. Buchanan*	Dem./Lib.	
New York	13th	Orest V. Maresca*	Dem./Lib.	
New York	14th	Kenneth M. Phipps*	Dem./Lib.	
New York	15th	William A. Kummer*	Democrat	
New York	16th	Frank G. Rossetti*	Dem./Lib.	
Niagara	1st	Harold H. Altro	Republican	
Niagara	2nd	Ernest Curto*	Republican	
Oneida	1st	David R. Townsend	Republican	
Oneida	2nd	William S. Calli*	Republican	
Onondaga	1st	Lawrence M. Rulison*	Republican	
Onondaga	2nd	Charles A. Schoeneck Jr.*	Republican	
Onondaga	3rd	Philip R. Chase*	Republican	
Ontario		Robert M. Quigley*	Republican	
Orange	1st	D. Clinton Dominick III*	Republican	
Orange	2nd	Wilson C. Van Duzer*	Republican	
Orleans		Alonzo L. Waters*	Republican	
Oswego		Edward F. Crawford	Republican	
Otsego		Paul L. Talbot*	Republican	
Putnam		Willis H. Stephens*	Republican	
Queens	1st	Thomas V. LaFauci*	Dem./Lib.	
Queens	2nd	William C. Brennan*	Dem./Lib.	
Queens	3rd	Charles T. Eckstein*	Republican	
Queens	4th	Frank R. McGlynn Jr.	Dem./Lib.	
Queens	5th	William G. Giaccio*	Dem./Lib.	
Queens	6th	Michael G. Rice*	Democrat	
Queens	7th	Bernard Dubin*	Dem./Lib.	
Queens	8th	John DiLeonardo*	Republican	
Queens	9th	Fred W. Preller*	Republican	
Queens	10th	Louis Wallach*	Dem./Lib.	
Queens	11th	Alfred D. Lerner	Rep./Lib.	
Queens	12th	J. Lewis Fox*	Dem./Lib.	
Queens	13th	Anthony P. Savarese Jr.*	Republican	
Rensselaer		Thomas H. Brown*	Republican	
Richmond	1st	Edward J. Amann Jr.*	Republican	
Richmond	2nd	Lucio F. Russo*	Republican	
Rockland		Robert Walmsley*	Republican	
St. Lawrence		Verner M. Ingram	Republican	
Saratoga		John L. Ostrander*	Republican	
Schenectady		Oswald D. Heck*	Republican	re-elected Speaker
Schoharie		David Enders*	Republican	
Schuyler		Jerry W. Black*	Republican	
Seneca		Lawrence W. Van Cleef*	Republican	
Steuben		Charles D. Henderson	Republican	
Suffolk	1st	Irving L. Price Jr.	Republican	
Suffolk	2nd	Prescott B. Huntington	Republican	
Suffolk	3rd	James R. Grover Jr.	Republican	
Sullivan		Hyman E. Mintz*	Rep./Lib.	
Tioga		Richard C. Lounsberry*	Republican	
Tompkins		Ray S. Ashbery*	Republican	
Ulster		Kenneth L. Wilson*	Republican	
Warren		Stuart F. Hawley*	Republican	
Washington		William J. Reid*	Republican	
Wayne		Mildred F. Taylor*	Republican	
Westchester	1st	Malcolm Wilson*	Republican	on November 4, 1958, elected Lieutenant Governor
Westchester	2nd	Fred S. Suthergreen*	Republican	
Westchester	3rd	Frances K. Marlatt*	Republican	
Westchester	4th	Hunter Meighan*	Republican	
Westchester	5th	William F. Horan*	Republican	
Westchester	6th	Theodore Hill Jr.*	Republican	
Wyoming		Harold L. Peet*	Republican	
Yates		Vernon W. Blodgett*	Republican	

=== Employees ===
- Clerk: Ansley B. Borkowski
- Sergeant-at-Arms: Raymond J. Roche
- Deputy Journal Clerk: Maude E. Ten Eyck

== Sources ==
- Members of the New York Senate (1950s) at Political Graveyard
- Members of the New York Assembly (1950s) at Political Graveyard
