= Senator Farrell =

Senator Farrell may refer to:

- Don Farrell (born 1954), Australian senate
- Daniel F. Farrell (died 1939), New York State Senate
- John H. Farrell (1919–1995), New York State Senate
- Peter T. Farrell (1900–1992), New York State Senate
