= Frances K. Marlatt =

American politician

- Frances K. Marlatt, from a 1956 magazine
- Born: March 24, 1901; Buffalo, New York
- Died: November 28, 1969 (aged 68); Mount Vernon, New York
- Occupations: Lawyer, politician
- Known for: New York State Assemblywoman (1954–1960)

Frances Knoche Marlatt (March 24, 1901 – November 28, 1969) was an American lawyer and politician from New York.

== Life ==
She was born on March 24, 1901, in Buffalo, New York, the daughter of painter Hamilton Irving Marlatt (1860–1929) and Lillie Belle (Knoche) Marlatt. She attended the public schools in Mount Vernon. She graduated B.A. from Barnard College in 1921; M.A. in sociology from Columbia University in 1922; and LL.B. from New York University School of Law in 1925. She was Editor-in-Chief of the New York University Law Review, the first woman to hold that position. She was admitted to the bar in 1926, and practiced law in Mount Vernon.

In 1949, she was appointed to the Board of Supervisors of Westchester County, to fill the vacancy caused by the resignation of Charles L. Hughes.

Frances Marlatt was a member of the New York State Assembly (Westchester Co., 3rd D.) from 1954 to 1960, sitting in the 169th, 170th, 171st and 172nd New York State Legislatures.

She died on November 28, 1969, in Mount Vernon Hospital in Mount Vernon, New York; and was buried at the Woodlawn Cemetery in the Bronx.

== Sources ==
New York State Assembly
Preceded by Harold D. Toomey	New York State Assembly; Westchester County, 3rd District; 1954–1960	Succeeded by George E. Van Cott
