= Theodore D. Day =

American farmer and politician (1917–2003)

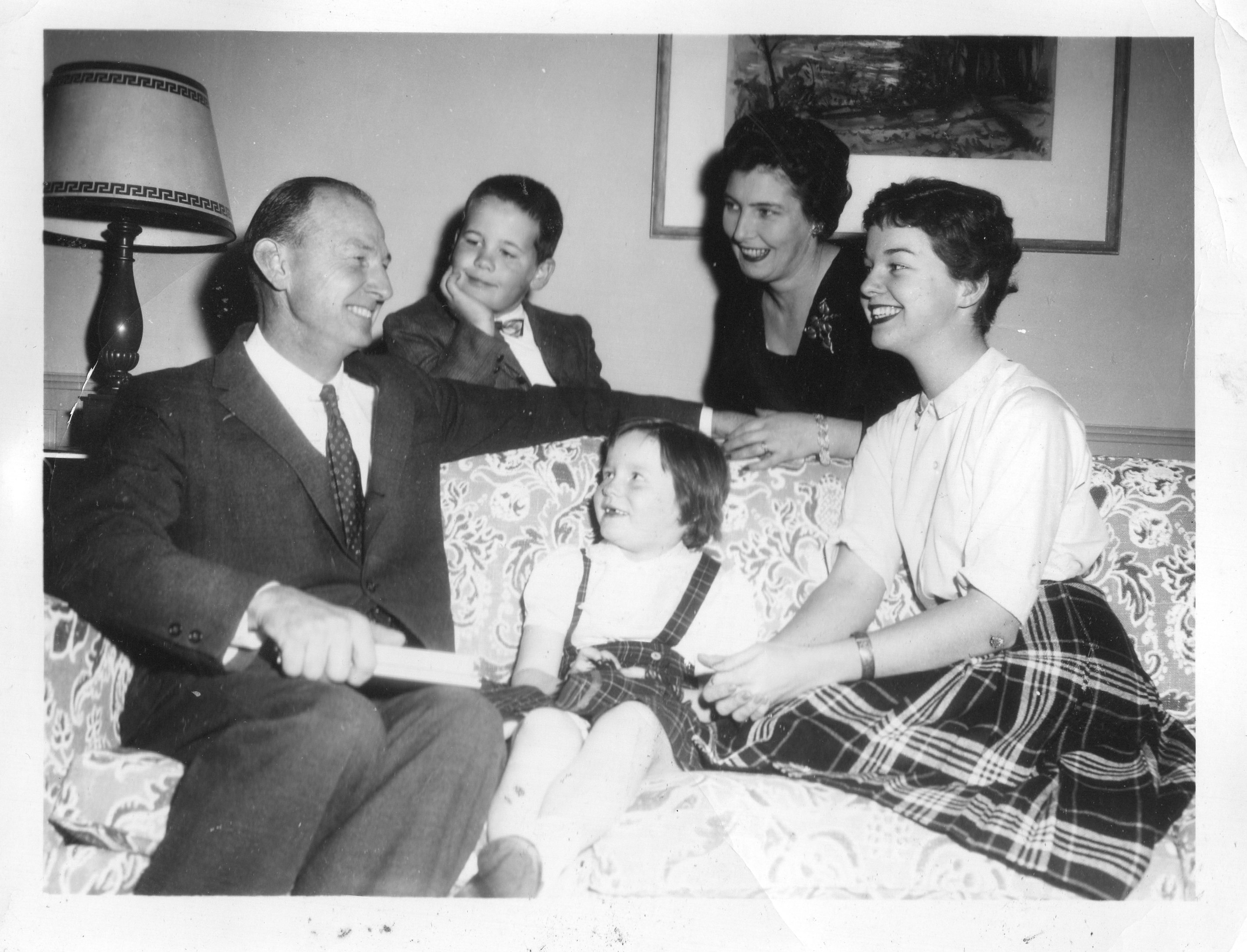
Theodore Day with his wife Fran, and three kids, Rick, Mary, and Kathy

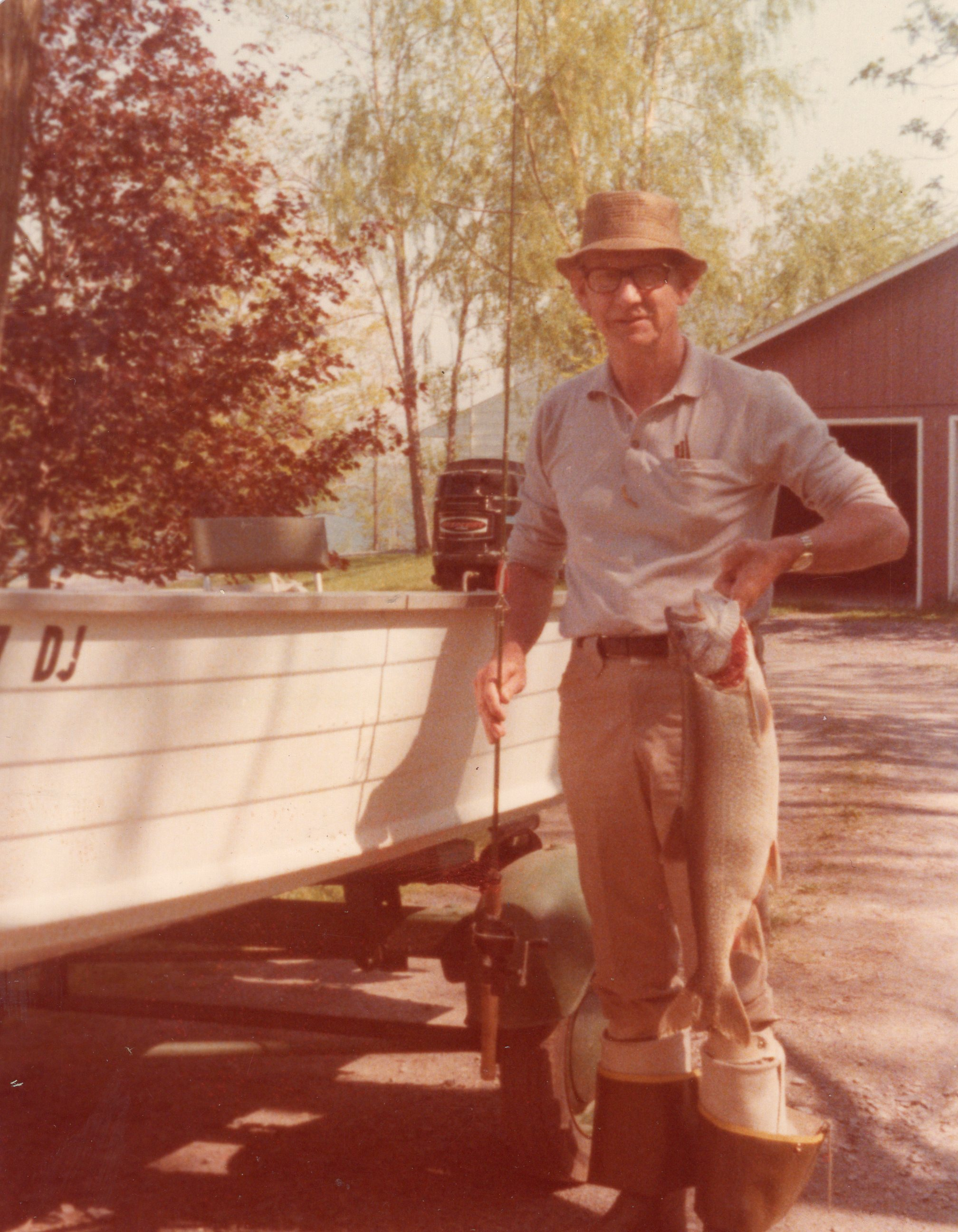
Theodore Day fishing for trout

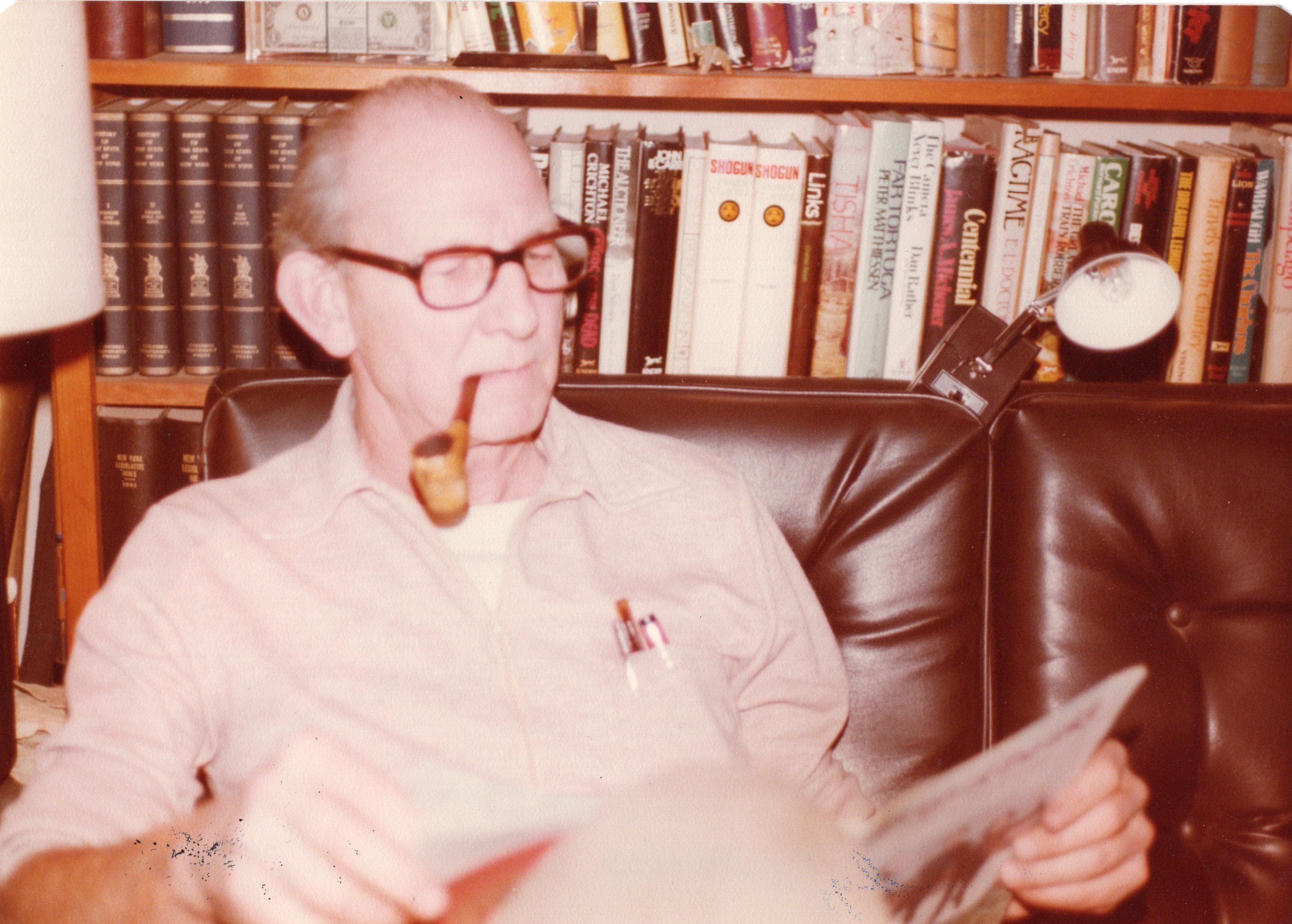
Theodore Day in his home office

Theodore D. Day (April 20, 1917 – December 22, 2003) was an American farmer and politician from New York.

Day was born in New York City. He attended Phillips Academy and graduated from Yale University in 1940. Day ran a dairy farm in Interlaken, Seneca County, New York. He married Frances MacPherson, and they had three children. Day was an avid fisherman and outdoorsman.

Day was a member of the New York State Assembly (Seneca County) from 1961 to 1965, sitting in the 173rd, 174th, and 175th New York State Legislatures.

Day was a member of the New York State Senate from 1966 to 1972, sitting in the 176th, 177th, 178th, and 179th New York State Legislatures. In 1972, he was appointed assistant commissioner of the New York State Department of Agriculture and Markets.

Day died at Cayuga Medical Center in Ithaca, New York.

== Sources ==
New York State Assembly
Preceded by Francis J. Souhan	New York State Assembly; Seneca County; 1961–1965	Succeeded by district abolished
New York State Senate
Preceded by Earl W. Brydges	New York State Senate; 54th District; 1966	Succeeded by Thomas F. McGowan
Preceded by Dalwin J. Niles	New York State Senate; 49th District; 1967–1972	Succeeded by Martin S. Auer
