= 170th New York State Legislature =

New York state legislative session

| ← | 169th | 171st | → |
- New York State Capitol (2009)

Overview
- Legislative body: New York State Legislature
- Jurisdiction: New York, United States
- Term: January 1, 1955 – December 31, 1956

Senate
- Members: 58
- President: Lt. Gov. George B. DeLuca (D)
- Temporary President: Walter J. Mahoney (R)
- Party control: Republican (1955: 34–24) (1956: 35–23)

Assembly
- Members: 150
- Speaker: Oswald D. Heck (R)
- Party control: Republican (90–60)

Sessions
- 1st: January 5 – April 2, 1955
- 2nd: January 4 – March 23, 1956

The 170th New York State Legislature, consisting of the New York State Senate and the New York State Assembly, met from January 5, 1955, to March 23, 1956, during the first and second years of W. Averell Harriman's governorship, in Albany.

== Background ==
Under the provisions of the New York Constitution of 1938, re-apportioned in 1953, 58 Senators and 150 assemblymen were elected in single-seat districts for two-year terms. The senatorial districts consisted either of one or more entire counties; or a contiguous area within a single county. The counties which were divided into more than one senatorial district were Kings (nine districts), New York (six), Queens (five), Bronx (four), Erie (three), Nassau (three), Westchester (three), Monroe (two) and Onondaga (two). The Assembly districts consisted either of a single entire county (except Hamilton Co.), or of contiguous area within one county.

At this time there were two major political parties: the Republican Party and the Democratic Party. The Liberal Party, the American Labor Party, the Socialist Workers Party, and the Socialist Labor Party (running under the name of "Industrial Government Party") also nominated tickets.

== Elections ==
The 1954 New York state election was held on November 2. Ambassador W. Averell Harriman was elected Governor, and D.A. of Bronx County George B. DeLuca was elected Lieutenant Governor, both Democrats with Liberal endorsement. The elections of the other six statewide elective offices resulted in a Democratic State Comptroller with Liberal endorsement, a Republican Attorney General, a Democratic Chief Judge with Liberal and Republican endorsement, a Democratic Court of Appeals judge with Liberal and Republican endorsement, a Democratic Court of Appeals judge with Liberal endorsement, and a Republican Court of Appeals judge with Democratic endorsement. The approximate party strength at this election, as expressed by the vote for Governor/Lieutenant Governor, was: Republicans 2,550,000; Democrats 2,297,000; Liberals 264,000; American Labor 47,000; Socialist Workers 2,600; and Industrial Government 1,700.

Five of the seven women members of the previous legislature—Assemblywomen Mary A. Gillen (Dem.), of Brooklyn; Janet Hill Gordon (Rep.), a lawyer of Norwich; Frances K. Marlatt (Rep.), a lawyer of Mount Vernon; Genesta M. Strong (Rep.), of Plandome Heights; and Mildred F. Taylor (Rep.), a coal dealer of Lyons—were re-elected. Bessie A. Buchanan (Dem.), a retired musical actress and dancer of Harlem, was also elected to the Assembly.

The 1955 New York state election was held on November 8. No statewide elective offices were up for election. Three vacancies in the State Senate and three vacancies in the Assembly were filled.

== Sessions ==
The Legislature met for the first regular session (the 178th) at the State Capitol in Albany on January 5, 1955; and adjourned on April 2.

Oswald D. Heck (Rep.) was re-elected Speaker.

Walter J. Mahoney (Rep.) was re-elected Temporary President of the State Senate.

The Legislature met for the second regular session (the 179th) at the State Capitol in Albany on January 4, 1956; and adjourned on March 23.

== State Senate ==
=== Districts ===
- 1st District: Suffolk County
- 2nd, 3rd and 4th District: Parts of Nassau County
- 5th, 6th, 7th, 8th and 9th District: Parts of Queens County, i.e. the Borough of Queens
- 10th, 11th, 12th, 13th, 14th, 15th, 16th, 17th and 18th District: Parts of Kings County, i.e. the Borough of Brooklyn
- 19th District: Richmond County, i.e. the Borough of Richmond (now the Borough of Staten Island)
- 20th, 21st, 22nd, 23rd, 24th and 25th District: Parts of New York County, i.e. the Borough of Manhattan
- 26th, 27th, 28th and 29th District: Parts of Bronx County, i.e. the Borough of the Bronx
- 30th, 31st and 32nd District: Parts of Westchester County
- 33rd District: Orange and Rockland counties
- 34th District: Delaware, Greene, Sullivan and Ulster counties
- 35th District: Columbia, Dutchess and Putnam counties
- 36th District: Albany County
- 37th District: Rensselaer and Washington counties
- 38th District: Schenectady and Schoharie counties
- 39th District: Essex, Saratoga and Warren counties
- 40th District: Clinton, Franklin and St. Lawrence counties
- 41st District: Fulton, Hamilton, Herkimer and Montgomery counties
- 42nd District: Oneida County
- 43rd District: Jefferson, Lewis and Oswego
- 44th and 45th District: Parts of Onondaga County
- 46th District: Chenango, Cortland, Madison and Otsego counties
- 47th District: Broome County
- 48th District: Cayuga, Tioga and Tompkins counties
- 49th District: Chemung and Steuben counties
- 50th District: Ontario, Schuyler, Seneca, Wayne and Yates counties
- 51st and 52nd District: Parts of Monroe County
- 53rd District: Allegany, Genesee, Livingston, Orleans and Wyoming counties
- 54th District: Niagara County
- 55th, 56th and 57th District: Parts of Erie County
- 58th District: Cattaraugus and Chautauqua counties

=== Senators ===
The asterisk (*) denotes members of the previous Legislature who continued in office as members of this Legislature. Searles G. Shultz changed from the Assembly to the Senate at the beginning of this Legislature. Assemblyman Frank J. Pino was elected to fill a vacancy in the Senate.

Note: For brevity, the chairmanships omit the words "...the Committee on (the)..."

| District | Senator | Party | Notes |
|---|---|---|---|
| 1st | S. Wentworth Horton* | Republican | |
| 2nd | Edward P. Larkin* | Republican | resigned on September 16, 1955, to run for Presiding Supervisor of the Town of Hempstead |
| 2nd | Daniel G. Albert | Republican | on November 8, 1955, elected to fill vacancy |
| 3rd | William S. Hults Jr.* | Republican | |
| 4th | Edward J. Speno | Republican | |
| 5th | Walter G. McGahan | Republican | |
| 6th | James J. Crisona | Dem./Lib. | |
| 7th | James G. Sweeney | Dem./Lib. | |
| 8th | Frank D. O'Connor | Dem./Lib. | on November 8, 1955, elected D.A. of Queens County |
| 8th | Bernard Tompkins | Republican | on February 7, 1956, elected to fill vacancy |
| 9th | Thomas J. Mackell | Democrat | |
| 10th | Herbert I. Sorin* | Dem./Lib. | |
| 11th | Walter E. Cooke | Dem./Lib. | |
| 12th | Fred G. Moritt* | Dem./Lib. | |
| 13th | Thomas J. Cuite* | Dem./Lib. | |
| 14th | John F. Furey* | Dem./Lib. | |
| 15th | Louis L. Friedman* | Dem./Lib. | on October 5, 1955, appointed to the NY Supreme Court |
| 15th | Frank J. Pino* | Dem./Lib. | on November 8, 1955, elected to fill vacancy |
| 16th | William Rosenblatt* | Dem./Lib. | |
| 17th | Samuel L. Greenberg* | Dem./Lib. | |
| 18th | Harry Gittleson* | Dem./Lib. | |
| 19th | Edward V. Curry | Democrat | |
| 20th | MacNeil Mitchell* | Republican | |
| 21st | James Lopez Watson | Dem./Lib. | |
| 22nd | Alfred E. Santangelo* | Dem./Lib. | on November 6, 1956, elected to the 85th U.S. Congress |
| 23rd | Joseph Zaretzki* | Dem./Lib. | |
| 24th | Joseph R. Marro* | Dem./Lib. | |
| 25th | Francis J. Mahoney* | Dem./Lib. | Minority Leader; died on December 23, 1956 |
| 26th | John J. Donovan Jr.* | Democrat | died on March 12, 1955 |
| 26th | Harry Kraf | Democrat | on November 8, 1955, elected to fill vacancy |
| 27th | Jacob H. Gilbert | Democrat | |
| 28th | Nathaniel T. Helman* | Democrat | |
| 29th | Francis J. McCaffrey* | Democrat | |
| 30th | Frank S. McCullough* | Republican | |
| 31st | Pliny W. Williamson* | Republican | Chairman of Judiciary |
| 32nd | William F. Condon* | Republican | |
| 33rd | Thomas C. Desmond* | Republican | |
| 34th | Arthur H. Wicks* | Republican | |
| 35th | Ernest I. Hatfield* | Republican | |
| 36th | Peter J. Dalessandro* | Dem./Lib. | |
| 37th | Henry Neddo* | Republican | |
| 38th | Thomas F. Campbell* | Republican | |
| 39th | Gilbert T. Seelye* | Republican | |
| 40th | Robert C. McEwen* | Republican | |
| 41st | Walter Van Wiggeren* | Republican | |
| 42nd | Fred J. Rath* | Republican | |
| 43rd | Henry A. Wise* | Republican | |
| 44th | Searles G. Shultz* | Republican | |
| 45th | John H. Hughes* | Republican | |
| 46th | Wheeler Milmoe* | Rep./Dem. | |
| 47th | Warren M. Anderson* | Republican | |
| 48th | George R. Metcalf* | Republican | |
| 49th | Harry K. Morton* | Republican | |
| 50th | Dutton Peterson* | Republican | |
| 51st | Frank E. Van Lare* | Republican | |
| 52nd | George T. Manning* | Republican | died on December 1, 1956 |
| 53rd | Austin W. Erwin* | Republican | Chairman of Finance |
| 54th | Earl W. Brydges* | Republican | |
| 55th | Walter J. Mahoney* | Republican | re-elected Temporary President |
| 56th | Stanley J. Bauer* | Republican | |
| 57th | John H. Cooke* | Republican | |
| 58th | George H. Pierce* | Republican | |

=== Employees ===
- Secretary: William S. King

== State Assembly ==
=== Assemblymen ===
Note: For brevity, the chairmanships omit the words "...the Committee on (the)..."

| District | | Assemblymen | Party | Notes |
|---|---|---|---|---|
| Albany | 1st | Edwin Corning Jr. | Dem./Lib. | |
| Albany | 2nd | James J. McGuiness* | Dem./Lib. | |
| Allegany | | William H. MacKenzie* | Republican | Chairman of Ways and Means |
| Bronx | 1st | Bernard C. McDonnell* | Democrat | |
| Bronx | 2nd | Sidney H. Asch* | Democrat | |
| Bronx | 3rd | Morris Mohr* | Democrat | died on September 21, 1956 |
| Bronx | 4th | Felipe N. Torres* | Democrat | |
| Bronx | 5th | Melville E. Abrams | Democrat | |
| Bronx | 6th | Walter H. Gladwin* | Democrat | |
| Bronx | 7th | John T. Satriale* | Democrat | |
| Bronx | 8th | Mitchell J. Sherwin* | Democrat | |
| Bronx | 9th | William Kapelman* | Democrat | |
| Bronx | 10th | Matthew R. Dwyer | Democrat | |
| Bronx | 11th | Enzo Gaspari | Democrat | |
| Bronx | 12th | Fred W. Eggert Jr. | Democrat | |
| Broome | 1st | Daniel S. Dickinson Jr. | Republican | |
| Broome | 2nd | George L. Ingalls* | Republican | |
| Cattaraugus | | Leo P. Noonan* | Republican | |
| Cayuga | | Charles A. Cusick* | Republican | |
| Chautauqua | | E. Herman Magnuson* | Republican | died on July 15, 1955 |
| Chautauqua | | A. Bruce Manley | Republican | on November 8, 1955, elected to fill vacancy |
| Chemung | | Harry J. Tifft* | Republican | |
| Chenango | | Janet Hill Gordon* | Republican | |
| Clinton | | James A. FitzPatrick* | Rep./Dem. | |
| Columbia | | Willard C. Drumm* | Republican | |
| Cortland | | Louis H. Folmer* | Republican | |
| Delaware | | Edwyn E. Mason* | Republican | |
| Dutchess | | Robert Watson Pomeroy* | Republican | |
| Erie | 1st | Thomas J. Runfola* | Republican | |
| Erie | 2nd | Justin C. Morgan* | Republican | Chairman of Judiciary |
| Erie | 3rd | William J. Butler* | Republican | |
| Erie | 4th | Frank J. Caffery* | Dem./Lib. | |
| Erie | 5th | John B. Lis* | Dem./Lib. | |
| Erie | 6th | George F. Dannebrock* | Republican | |
| Erie | 7th | Julius Volker* | Republican | |
| Erie | 8th | William Sadler* | Republican | |
| Essex | | Grant W. Johnson* | Republican | |
| Franklin | | Robert G. Main* | Republican | |
| Fulton and Hamilton | | Joseph R. Younglove* | Republican | |
| Genesee | | John E. Johnson* | Republican | |
| Greene | | William E. Brady* | Republican | |
| Herkimer | | Leo A. Lawrence* | Rep./Dem. | |
| Jefferson | | Orin S. Wilcox* | Rep./Lib. | |
| Kings | 1st | Max M. Turshen* | Dem./Lib. | |
| Kings | 2nd | J. Sidney Levine* | Dem./Lib. | died on December 22, 1955 |
| Kings | 2nd | Samuel Bonom | Democrat | on February 7, 1956, elected to fill vacancy |
| Kings | 3rd | Mary A. Gillen* | Dem./Lib. | |
| Kings | 4th | Bernard Austin* | Dem./Lib. | |
| Kings | 5th | John A. Monteleone* | Dem./Lib. | |
| Kings | 6th | Bertram L. Baker* | Dem./Lib. | |
| Kings | 7th | Louis Kalish* | Dem./Lib. | |
| Kings | 8th | Frank Composto* | Dem./Lib. | |
| Kings | 9th | Frank J. McMullen* | Republican | |
| Kings | 10th | John J. Ryan* | Dem./Lib. | |
| Kings | 11th | Eugene F. Bannigan* | Dem./Lib. | Minority Leader |
| Kings | 12th | Frank Vaccaro | Dem./Lib. | |
| Kings | 13th | Lawrence P. Murphy* | Dem./Lib. | |
| Kings | 14th | Edward S. Lentol* | Democrat | |
| Kings | 15th | Alfred A. Lama* | Dem./Lib. | |
| Kings | 16th | Frank J. Pino* | Dem./Lib. | resigned on October 6, 1955, to run for the State Senate |
| Kings | 16th | Bernard Haber | Dem./Lib. | on November 8, 1955, elected to fill vacancy |
| Kings | 17th | Samuel I. Berman | Dem./Lib. | |
| Kings | 18th | Stanley Steingut* | Dem./Lib. | |
| Kings | 19th | Frank S. Samansky* | Democrat | |
| Kings | 20th | Joseph R. Corso* | Dem./Lib. | |
| Kings | 21st | Bertram L. Podell | Democrat | |
| Kings | 22nd | Anthony J. Travia* | Dem./Lib. | |
| Lewis | | Benjamin H. Demo* | Republican | |
| Livingston | | Joseph W. Ward* | Republican | |
| Madison | | Harold I. Tyler* | Republican | |
| Monroe | 1st | J. Eugene Goddard* | Republican | |
| Monroe | 2nd | A. Gould Hatch* | Rep./Lib. | |
| Monroe | 3rd | Paul B. Hanks Jr.* | Rep./Lib. | |
| Monroe | 4th | Thomas F. Riley* | Republican | |
| Montgomery | | Donald A. Campbell* | Republican | |
| Nassau | 1st | Anthony Barbiero | Republican | |
| Nassau | 2nd | Joseph F. Carlino* | Republican | Majority Leader |
| Nassau | 3rd | Genesta M. Strong* | Republican | |
| Nassau | 4th | John J. Burns* | Republican | |
| Nassau | 5th | Francis P. McCloskey | Republican | |
| Nassau | 6th | Palmer D. Farrington | Republican | |
| New York | 1st | William F. Passannante | Dem./Lib. | |
| New York | 2nd | Louis DeSalvio* | Democrat | |
| New York | 3rd | John J. Mangan* | Dem./Lib. | on June 2, 1955, appointed to the Municipal Court |
| New York | 3rd | John H. Farrell | Dem./Lib. | on November 8, 1955, elected to fill vacancy; unsuccessfully contested by Peter H. Brennan |
| New York | 4th | Leonard Farbstein* | Democrat | on November 6, 1956, elected to the 85th U.S. Congress |
| New York | 5th | Ludwig Teller* | Dem./Lib. | on November 6, 1956, elected to the 85th U.S. Congress |
| New York | 6th | Joseph J. Weiser | Democrat | |
| New York | 7th | Daniel M. Kelly* | Dem./Lib. | |
| New York | 8th | Archibald Douglas Jr.* | Republican | |
| New York | 9th | John R. Brook* | Republican | |
| New York | 10th | Herman Katz* | Dem./Lib. | |
| New York | 11th | James C. Thomas* | Dem./Lib. | |
| New York | 12th | Bessie A. Buchanan | Dem./Lib. | |
| New York | 13th | Orest V. Maresca* | Dem./Lib. | |
| New York | 14th | Kenneth M. Phipps* | Dem./Lib. | |
| New York | 15th | William A. Kummer | Democrat | |
| New York | 16th | Frank G. Rossetti | Dem./Lib. | |
| Niagara | 1st | Jacob E. Hollinger* | Republican | |
| Niagara | 2nd | Ernest Curto* | Rep./Lib. | |
| Oneida | 1st | Francis J. Alder* | Republican | |
| Oneida | 2nd | William S. Calli* | Republican | |
| Onondaga | 1st | Lawrence M. Rulison* | Republican | |
| Onondaga | 2nd | Charles A. Schoeneck Jr. | Republican | |
| Onondaga | 3rd | Philip R. Chase | Republican | |
| Ontario | | Robert M. Quigley* | Republican | |
| Orange | 1st | D. Clinton Dominick III | Republican | |
| Orange | 2nd | Wilson C. Van Duzer* | Republican | |
| Orleans | | Alonzo L. Waters* | Republican | |
| Oswego | | Henry D. Coville* | Republican | |
| Otsego | | Paul L. Talbot* | Republican | |
| Putnam | | Willis H. Stephens* | Republican | |
| Queens | 1st | Thomas V. LaFauci* | Dem./Lib. | |
| Queens | 2nd | William C. Brennan | Democrat | |
| Queens | 3rd | Charles T. Eckstein | Republican | |
| Queens | 4th | Thomas A. Duffy* | Dem./Lib. | |
| Queens | 5th | William G. Giaccio* | Dem./Lib. | |
| Queens | 6th | Michael G. Rice | Democrat | |
| Queens | 7th | Bernard Dubin | Democrat | |
| Queens | 8th | John DiLeonardo | Republican | |
| Queens | 9th | Fred W. Preller* | Republican | |
| Queens | 10th | Louis Wallach | Democrat | |
| Queens | 11th | Daniel L. Clarke | Dem./Lib. | |
| Queens | 12th | J. Lewis Fox* | Dem./Lib. | |
| Queens | 13th | Anthony P. Savarese Jr.* | Republican | |
| Rensselaer | | Thomas H. Brown* | Republican | |
| Richmond | 1st | Edward J. Amann Jr.* | Rep./Lib. | |
| Richmond | 2nd | Lucio F. Russo* | Rep./Lib. | |
| Rockland | | Robert Walmsley* | Republican | |
| St. Lawrence | | Allan P. Sill* | Republican | |
| Saratoga | | John L. Ostrander* | Republican | |
| Schenectady | | Oswald D. Heck* | Republican | re-elected Speaker |
| Schoharie | | David Enders* | Republican | |
| Schuyler | | Jerry W. Black* | Republican | |
| Seneca | | Lawrence W. Van Cleef* | Republican | |
| Steuben | | Charles D. Henderson | Rep./Dem. | |
| Suffolk | 1st | Edmund R. Lupton* | Republican | |
| Suffolk | 2nd | Elisha T. Barrett* | Republican | |
| Suffolk | 3rd | John R. Britting | Republican | |
| Sullivan | | Hyman E. Mintz* | Rep./Lib. | |
| Tioga | | Richard C. Lounsberry* | Republican | |
| Tompkins | | Ray S. Ashbery* | Republican | |
| Ulster | | Kenneth L. Wilson* | Republican | |
| Warren | | Stuart F. Hawley* | Republican | |
| Washington | | William J. Reid* | Republican | |
| Wayne | | Mildred F. Taylor* | Republican | |
| Westchester | 1st | Malcolm Wilson* | Republican | |
| Westchester | 2nd | Fred S. Suthergreen | Republican | |
| Westchester | 3rd | Frances K. Marlatt* | Republican | |
| Westchester | 4th | Hunter Meighan* | Republican | |
| Westchester | 5th | William F. Horan* | Republican | |
| Westchester | 6th | Theodore Hill Jr.* | Republican | |
| Wyoming | | Harold L. Peet* | Republican | |
| Yates | | Vernon W. Blodgett* | Republican | |

=== Employees ===
- Clerk: Ansley B. Borkowski
- Sergeant-at-Arms: Herbert A. Bartholomew (1955)
  - Raymond J. Roche (1956)
- Deputy Journal Clerk: Maude E. Ten Eyck

== Sources ==
- Where to Reach Your State Senator Or Assemblyman in Civil Service Leader (January 18, 1955, Vol. XVI, No. 19, pg. 3 and 14)
- Members of the New York Senate (1950s) at Political Graveyard
- Members of the New York Assembly (1950s) at Political Graveyard
