= Jeremiah B. Bloom =

New York politician

Jeremiah B. Bloom (May 25, 1913 – October 2, 1983) was an American lawyer and politician from New York.

== Biography ==
He was born on May 25, 1913, in New York City. He attended Brooklyn Evening Technical High School. He graduated from St. John's University and St. John's University School of Law. During World War II he served in the U.S. Navy as a chief petty officer. He married Dorothy Sotland, and they had one son.

Bloom was a member of the New York City Council from 1950 to 1957.

He was a member of the New York State Senate from 1958 to 1978, sitting in the 171st, 172nd, 173rd, 174th, 175th, 176th, 177th, 178th, 179th, 180th, 181st and 182nd New York State Legislatures. In 1978, he challenged Hugh Carey in the Democratic primary for Governor of New York, but was defeated.

In 1980, he supported Republican Ronald Reagan for U.S. President.

He died on October 2, 1983, in St. Clare's Hospital in Manhattan, after a heart attack at the Port Authority Bus Terminal; and was buried at Mount Lebanon Cemetery in Glendale, Queens. He was Jewish.

== Sources ==
New York State Senate
Preceded by Fred G. Moritt	New York State Senate; 12th District; 1958–1965	Succeeded by Nicholas Ferraro
Preceded by Constance Baker Motley	New York State Senate; 21st District; 1966	Succeeded by William T. Conklin
Preceded by James H. Shaw, Jr.	New York State Senate; 17th District; 1967–1972	Succeeded by Chester J. Straub
Preceded by Samuel L. Greenberg	New York State Senate; 19th District; 1973–1978	Succeeded by Marty Markowitz
