= Eugene Rodriguez (politician) =

American politician (1929–1999)

Eugene Rodriguez y Scorio (June 4, 1929 – August 26, 1999) was an American lawyer and politician from New York.

== Life and career ==
Eugene Rodriguez was born on June 4, 1929, in East Harlem, New York City. He attended Straubenmuller Textile High School. He graduated from Long Island University and Brooklyn Law School. During the Korean War he served in the U.S. Army. He was admitted to the bar in 1955, and practiced law in New York City.

Rodriguez was a member of the New York State Assembly (Bronx Co., 4th D.) in 1965. In September 1965, after re-apportionment, he ran in the 87th District for re-nomination, but was defeated in the Democratic primary by Salvatore R. Almeida.

In 1966, Rodriguez approached ex-convict Louis Fess Taylor to help him quash a narcotics indictment. Rodriguez asked for $100,000 and promised to fix the case. Taylor talked to the D.A.'s office about the offer, and at the next meetings carried a recording device. On July 27, Rodriguez was indicted for attempted extortion. On November 8, Rodriguez was elected to the New York State Senate (29th D.), but he did not take his seat in the 177th New York State Legislature. His trial opened on December 12. He asked his chauffeur Antonio Maldonado and one José Sierra to kill Taylor to prevent him from testifying at the trial. On January 13, 1967, Rodriguez was convicted of perjury and attempted grand larceny. On February 14, he was sentenced to one and a half to four years in jail, and thus vacated his Senate seat. On February 27, he pleaded guilty to have conspired to murder Taylor. On March 2, he was sentenced to one and a half to four years in jail for conspiracy to commit murder, to be served concurrently with the sentence for perjury. On April 4, 1967, he was disbarred by the Appellate Division. He was released from Clinton Correctional Facility on December 24, 1969.

On August 23, 1973, Rodriguez was arrested at his home in the East Village, Manhattan for illegal gambling.

Rodriguez died in Aliso Viejo, California on August 26, 1999, at the age of 70.

New York State Assembly
Preceded by Frank Torres	New York State Assembly; Bronx County, 4th District; 1965	Succeeded by district abolished
New York State Senate
Preceded by Manfred Ohrenstein	New York State Senate; 29th District; 1967	Succeeded by Robert García
