= Charles A. Schoeneck Jr. =

American politician

Charles August Schoeneck Jr. (February 3, 1912 – August 19, 1989) was an American lawyer and politician from New York.

== Life ==
He was born on February 3, 1912, in Syracuse, Onondaga County, New York, the son of Charles August Schoeneck (1866–1954) and Louise Emma (Kappesser) Schoeneck (1870–1960). He attended the public schools. He graduated A.B. from Syracuse University in 1933; and LL.B. from Harvard Law School in 1936. He was admitted to the bar in 1936, and practiced in Syracuse as a partner in Bond, Schoeneck & King. He married Elizabeth Ellen Brandt (1921–2008), and they had two children.

Schoeneck was a member of the New York State Assembly (Onondaga Co., 2nd D.) from 1955 to 1960, sitting in the 170th, 171st and 172nd New York State Legislatures. On July 1, 1959, he was appointed as Majority Leader of the Assembly. In November 1960, he ran for re-election, but was defeated by Democrat George P. Savage.

He was Chairman of the New York State Republican Committee from May 1967 to April 1969.

He was a presidential elector in 1972, voting for Richard Nixon and Spiro Agnew.

He died on August 19, 1989, in Crouse Irving Memorial Hospital in Syracuse, New York; and was buried at the Oakwood Cemetery there.

== Sources ==
New York State Assembly
Preceded by Donald H. Mead	New York State Assembly; Onondaga County, 2nd District; 1955–1960	Succeeded by George P. Savage
Political offices
Preceded by Joseph F. Carlino	Majority Leader of the New York State Assembly; 1959–1960	Succeeded by George L. Ingalls
Party political offices
Preceded by Carl Spad	Chairman of the New York State Republican Committee; 1967–1969	Succeeded by Charles T. Lanigan
