= John H. Cooke =

American politician

Chair of the Erie County Republican Party
- In office 1959–1962
- Preceded by: Ralph Lehr
- Succeeded by: Robert W. Grimm

Member of the New York Senate from the 57th district
- In office 1951–1962

Personal details
- Born: John Henry Cooke; June 29, 1911 Jamestown, New York, U.S.
- Died: March 31, 1998 (aged 86) Buffalo, New York, U.S.
- Resting place: Forest Lawn Cemetery
- Party: Republican
- Spouse: Eleanor Jean Anson (m. ?)
- Children: 2
- Parent(s): Edmund F. Cooke; Jennie Olivia (Swanson) Cooke
- Relatives: Richard T. Cooke
- Education: Washington and Lee University
- Occupation: Lawyer and politician

John Henry Cooke (June 29, 1911 – March 31, 1998) was an American lawyer and politician from New York.

== Life ==
He was born on June 29, 1911, in Jamestown, Chautauqua County, New York, the son of Congressman Edmund F. Cooke (1885–1967) and Jennie Olivia (Swanson) Cooke (1884–1972). He attended Alden High School, and Central High School in Washington, D.C. He graduated from Washington and Lee University. He began to practice law in Alden in 1937, and entered politics as a Republican. He married Eleanor Jean Anson (1915–2003), and they had two children.

Cooke was Supervisor of the Town of Alden from 1943 to 1950; Chairman of the Board of Supervisors of Erie County in 1950; and a member of the New York State Senate from 1951 to 1962, sitting in the 168th, 169th, 170th, 171st, 172nd and 173rd New York State Legislatures.

On March 30, 1962, he was appointed by Gov. Nelson Rockefeller to the New York Court of Claims. He became Presiding Judge of the Court of Claims in 1973, and retired from the bench in 1978.

He died on March 31, 1998, in Buffalo, New York; and was buried at the Forest Lawn Cemetery there.

State Senator Richard T. Cooke (1913–2003) was his brother.

== Sources ==
New York State Senate
Preceded by Benjamin Miller	New York State Senate; 55th District; 1951–1954	Succeeded by Walter J. Mahoney
Preceded by new district	New York State Senate; 57th District; 1955–1962	Succeeded by Richard T. Cooke
