= Constance E. Cook =

American politician (1919–2009)

Constance Cook

Personal details
- Born: August 17, 1919 Shaker Heights, Ohio, U.S.
- Died: January 20, 2009 (aged 89) Ithaca, New York, U.S.
- Party: Republican
- Education: Cornell University (BA, LLB)

Constance E. Cook (August 17, 1919 – January 20, 2009) was an American Republican Party politician who served in the New York State Assembly, where she co-authored a bill signed into law that legalized abortion in the state of New York in 1970, three years before the Roe v. Wade decision by the Supreme Court of the United States in 1973 legalized the practice nationwide.

== Biography ==
=== Early life ===
Cook was born on August 17, 1919, as Constance Eberhardt in Shaker Heights, Ohio, to Walter and Catherine Sellmann Eberhardt. She grew up in New York City, where she graduated from Hunter College High School. She attended Cornell University, receiving her undergraduate degree in 1941, before being awarded a law degree from Cornell Law School in 1943. She was appointed to serve as Cornell's vice president for land grant affairs, making her the first female vice president in Cornell history.

She worked with a Wall Street law firm for five years after graduating from law school, before returning to Ithaca, where she met, and married, her husband.

=== New York State Assembly ===
She was hired as a legal assistant to Assemblyman Ray S. Ashbery, and ran for his Assembly seat when he retired. She was a member of the New York State Assembly from 1963 to 1974, sitting in the 174th, 175th, 176th, 177th, 178th, 179th, and 180th New York State Legislatures. In the Assembly, she was an advocate for the expansion of the State University of New York.

Cook drafted a bill expanding abortion rights, together with Democratic Assemblyman Franz Leichter of Manhattan. They proposed legislation that included no restrictions on the practice of abortion. The bill passed in the Senate on March 18, 1970, after five hours of debate, by a vote of 31 to 26. In the Assembly, the bill was amended to allow women to have abortions until their 24th week of pregnancy, or at any time to protect the life of the mother. As the roll call progressed in the Assembly on April 9, 1970, the legislature deadlocked, at 74 in favor and 74 opposed, with one member absent and the Assembly speaker not voting. Assemblyman George M. Michaels, who had voted against the proposal, then asked to change his vote in favor of the new law. With the switch by Michaels, and Speaker Perry Duryea's yes-vote, the bill passed by a vote of 76 to 73 in the Assembly. Governor Nelson Rockefeller signed the law the next day, and the U.S. Supreme Court patterned its ruling in its landmark January 1973 decision Roe v. Wade on the New York law.

== Ordination of women ==
In 1976, Cook extended her support to the Rev. Betty Bone Schiess, one of the Philadelphia Eleven, who had been ordained as a priest in the Episcopal Church, but had not been granted a license to perform her priestly duties by the Episcopal Diocese of Central New York. Cook took the matter to the Equal Employment Opportunity Commission (EEOC/EEO) that issued a decision favoring Schiess.

The General Convention of the Episcopal Church in the United States of America passed a resolution in July 1976 that "no one shall be denied access" to ordination in the church based on gender. In November 1976, Ned Cole, the bishop who had blocked Schiess' ordination, indicated that he would have her ordained in ceremonies to be held in January 1977.

Interviewed after Cook's death, Schiess was quoted by The New York Times as stating that the legal challenge played a major role in driving the Episcopal Church to change its stance, noting that, "Nothing significant would have happened without the attention of Constance Cook."

== Quote ==
- "I didn't really have a sense at that time that we had done something momentous, though it was long overdue ... [L]ooking back now, it seems like a bigger deal." (Constance Cook on the 1970 New York State abortion bill; as she recounted to the New York Times in April 2000).

== Death ==
Constance Cook died at age 89 at her home in Ithaca, New York. Her husband, Alfred, had died in 1998. She was survived by two children, three grandchildren, and a sister.

New York State Assembly
Preceded by Ray Ashbery	Member of the New York Assembly from the Tompkins County district 1963–1965	Constituency abolished
New constituency	Member of the New York Assembly from the 138th district 1966	Succeeded by Gregory J. Pope
Preceded by George L. Ingalls	Member of the New York Assembly from the 125th district 1967–1972	Succeeded by Lloyd Stephen Riford Jr.
Preceded by Frederick L. Warder	Member of the New York Assembly from the 128th district 1973–1974	Succeeded by Gary A. Lee
