= Elisha T. Barrett =

New York politician

Member of the New York State Senate
- In office January 1, 1957 – May 8, 1966
- Preceded by: S. Wentworth Horton
- Succeeded by: Bernard C. Smith (redistricting)
- Constituency: 1st district (1957-1965); 3rd district (1966)

Member of the New York State Assembly from Suffolk County's 2nd district
- In office January 1, 1937 – December 31, 1956
- Preceded by: Hamilton F. Potter
- Succeeded by: Prescott B. Huntington

Personal details
- Born: September 11, 1902 Carmel, New York
- Died: May 8, 1966 (aged 63) Albany, New York
- Party: Republican

Elisha T. Barrett (September 11, 1902 – May 8, 1966) was an American politician from New York.

== Life ==
Barrett was born in Carmel, New York. His mother, Hana D. A. Barrett, was the first woman to run for office in Westchester County in 1922. He was a member of the New York State Assembly (Suffolk Co., 2nd D.) from 1937 to 1956, sitting in the 160th, 161st, 162nd, 163rd, 164th, 165th, 166th, 167th, 168th, 169th and 170th New York State Legislatures.

He was a member of the New York State Senate from 1957 to 1966, sitting in the 171st, 172nd, 173rd, 174th, 175th and 176th New York State Legislatures; and was Chairman of the Committee on Finance in 1963 and 1964.

His legislative work transcended his home state, being elected to two non-consecutive terms as Chairman of the Council of State Governments, first in 1953, while serving as a representative, and then in 1959, while serving in the New York State Senate. No other state legislator has served two non-consecutive terms in that position.

Following reapportionment in 1966, his district was consolidated with the 2nd district. Barrett retired after Suffolk County Republicans chose to nominate incumbent Senator Bernard C. Smith, who was drawn into the same district. He suffered a heart attack later that year and died at Albany Medical Center.

New York State Assembly
Preceded by Hamilton F. Potter	Member of the New York State Assembly from the Suffolk County 2nd district 1937–1956	Succeeded by Prescott B. Huntington
New York State Senate
Preceded by S. Wentworth Horton	Member of the New York State Senate from the 1st district 1957–1965	Succeeded by Leon E. Giuffreda
Preceded by Henry M. Curran	Member of the New York State Senate from the 3rd district 1966	Succeeded by Henry M. Curran
