= James C. Thomas =

American lawyer and politician

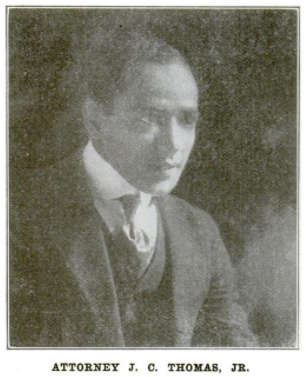
James C Thomas Jr, 1917

James C. Thomas (April 26, 1889 – August 13, 1958) was an American lawyer and politician from New York.

== Life ==
He was born on April 26, 1889, in New York City, the son of James C. Thomas and Ella (Rollison) Thomas. He graduated from City College of New York, and LL.B. from Cornell Law School in 1912.

He entered politics as a Republican. In 1917, he ran in the 26th District for the Board of Aldermen, but was defeated. In 1921, he married Laura M. Harmon, and they had two sons. From 1921 to 1927, he was an Assistant United States Attorney for the Southern District of New York. Afterwards he practiced law in New York City, specialising in immigration law.

Thomas was a Democratic member of the New York State Assembly (New York Co., 11th D.) from 1953 until his death in 1958, sitting in the 169th, 170th and 171st New York State Legislatures.

He died on August 13, 1958, in St. Agnes Hospital in White Plains, New York, after a stroke.

== Sources ==
New York State Assembly
Preceded by Joseph Pinckney	New York State Assembly; New York County, 11th District; 1953–1958	Succeeded by Lloyd E. Dickens
