= 1964 New York state election =

- November 3, 1964

The 1964 New York state election was held on November 3, 1964, to elect a U.S. Senator from New York, as well as all members of the New York State Assembly and the New York State Senate.

== U.S. Senate ==
Democratic former U.S. Attorney General Robert F. Kennedy defeated incumbent Republican Senator, Kenneth B. Keating.

== State Legislature ==
The Democratic majority in the New York State Senate was split into the followers of Mayor Robert Wagner, Jr. (15 senators) and U.S. Senator Robert F. Kennedy (18 senators). Thus, no Temporary President of the State Senate could be elected, and the State Senate could not be organized. After six weeks of deadlock, Republican Governor Nelson Rockefeller urged the Republican senators to vote for Joseph Zaretzki, the leader of the Wagner faction.

In April 1965, the New York Court of Appeals voided the reapportionment of the State Senate and Assembly districts enacted in December 1964, and ordered a new reapportionment and a new election of State legislators in November 1965. Thus the legislators elected in 1964 served an exceptional one-year term, as did the legislators elected in 1965.

== See also ==
- New York state elections
- 1964 United States presidential election

== Sources ==
- Official result in New York City: Canvass Shows Conservatives Rivaled Liberals in City Vote in NYT on November 26, 1964 (subscription required)
