= Fred G. Moritt =

American politician (1905–1995)

Member of the New York State Senate
- In office 1955–1957
- Preceded by: Samuel L. Greenberg
- Succeeded by: Jeremiah B. Bloom

Member of the New York State Senate
- In office 1945–1954
- Preceded by: James J. Crawford
- Succeeded by: Walter E. Cooke

Member of the New York State Assembly
- In office 1938–1944
- Preceded by: George W. Stewart
- Succeeded by: John J. Walsh

Personal details
- Born: October 5, 1905 New York City, U.S.
- Died: May 15, 1995 (aged 89)
- Spouse: Skye Muller
- Children: Leana Moritt & Pamela Moritt
- Education: New York University, Brooklyn Law School
- Occupation: Lawyer, singer, composer, lyricist, politician

Fred G. Moritt (October 5, 1905 – May 15, 1995) was an American lawyer, singer, composer, lyricist and politician from New York.

== Life ==
He was born on October 5, 1905, in New York City. He attended Public School No. 9 in Brooklyn, and Boys High School. He graduated from New York University and Brooklyn Law School, and practiced law in New York City. In 1933, he abandoned his law practice, and began a career as a singer (with baritone voice) on the stage and over the radio. In 1934, he returned to his law practice, and entered politics as a Democrat. He also wrote more than 60 songs.

Moritt was a member of the New York State Assembly (Kings Co., 17th D.) in 1938, 1939–40, 1941–42 and 1943–1944.

He was a member of the New York State Senate from 1945 to 1957, sitting in the 165th, 166th, 167th, 168th, 169th, 170th and 171st New York State Legislatures. He resigned his seat on September 13, 1957, and in November was elected to the New York City Municipal Court (4th D.).

He was a justice of the Municipal Court from 1958 to 1962, and of the New York City Civil Court from 1962 to 1975. On March 6, 1960, he married Skye Muller, an airline stewardess, and their daughter is Rabbi Leana Moritt.

In 1960, Fred Moritt wrote the lyrics and the score of a musical version of The Barretts of Wimpole Street under the title The Third Kiss which however never reached the stage. In 1974, State Special Anti-Corruption Prosecutor Maurice H. Nadjari investigated the financing of an attempted production of a second musical written by Moritt titled The Love Lottery (described as "a 'Guys and Dolls' type musical the judge hopes to produce in London"), accusing Moritt of having used the $18,500-a-year salary (paid by the city) of his law secretary for this purpose. On April 17, 1974, Moritt filed criminal charges against Nadjari for harassment, and demanded Nadjari be arrested. On the next day, Moritt was arrested, and indicted by a grand jury under instructions by Nadjari for conspiracy, perjury, grand larceny and witness-tampering. On May 6, 1974, Moritt pleaded not guilty. In February 1975, Moritt retired from the bench. On April 14, 1975, Moritt sued Nadjari and 12 other people involved in the indictment for $150,000,000 in damages. In September 1975, a federal court in Brooklyn allowed Moritt to proceed with his suit against Nadjari for prosecutorial misconduct. On August 12, 1976, the New York Supreme Court, Appellate Division ruled that Nadjari had no jurisdiction to prosecute in this case, and that the result of his investigation should have been handed over to the District Attorney of Kings County. Moritt tried to take his case to the U.S. Supreme Court, but in October 1976, the court declined to hear it. The case against Moritt was dismissed in February 1977.

He died on May 15, 1995.

== Sources ==
New York State Assembly
Preceded by George W. Stewart	New York State Assembly; Kings County, 17th District; 1938–1944	Succeeded by John J. Walsh
New York State Senate
Preceded by James J. Crawford	New York State Senate; 11th District; 1945–1954	Succeeded by Walter E. Cooke
Preceded by Samuel L. Greenberg	New York State Senate; 12th District; 1955–1957	Succeeded by Jeremiah B. Bloom
