= Walter E. Cooke =

American politician

Walter E. Cooke (November 22, 1910 – December 31, 1982) was an American politician from New York.

== Life ==
He was born on November 22, 1910, in Brooklyn, New York City. He married Lillian Reilly, and they had three daughters.

Cooke was a member of the New York State Assembly (Kings Co., 10th D.) in 1943 and 1944. In November 1944, he ran for re-election but was defeated by Republican Lewis W. Olliffe.

He was a member of the New York State Senate (11th D.) from 1955 to 1964, sitting in the 170th, 171st, 172nd, 173rd and 174th New York State Legislature.

He was again a member of the State Assembly in 1965.

He died on December 31, 1982, in Community Hospital in Brooklyn.

== Sources ==
New York State Assembly
Preceded by Francis E. Dorn	New York State Assembly; Kings County, 10th District; 1943–1944	Succeeded by Lewis W. Olliffe
Preceded by John J. Ryan	New York State Assembly; Kings County, 10th District; 1965	Succeeded by district abolished
New York State Senate
Preceded by Fred G. Moritt	New York State Senate; 11th District; 1955–1964	Succeeded by William C. Thompson
