= William T. Conklin =

American politician

William T. Conklin (April 28, 1908 – February 15, 1990) was an American politician from New York.

== Life ==
He was born on April 28, 1908, in Brooklyn, New York. He married Jessie F. Hanrahan (died 1980), and they had three children, among them William "Billy" Conklin (died 2013), who was developmentally disabled. The Conklin family lived in Bay Ridge, Brooklyn. Inspired by the challenges faced by his son Billy, Conklin was one of a group of parents who formed the Guild for Exceptional Children, and became a director of several other associations and medical facilities that cared for developmentally-disabled children. Conklin entered politics as a Republican, and, after a second attempt, unseated the Democratic incumbent and was elected to the New York State Senate, representing the 14th district, in November 1956.

Conklin served in the New York State Senate from 1957 to 1978, sitting in the 171st, 172nd, 173rd, 174th, 175th, 176th, 177th, 178th, 179th, 180th, 181st and 182nd New York State Legislatures. There he lobbied for the employment of developmentally-disabled persons as messengers and clerks by the state government in Albany, and sponsored legislation for mandatory tests of newborn babies for phenylketonuria.

He was a delegate to the 1972 Republican National Convention.

He died on February 15, 1990, in Brooklyn's now-defunct Victory Memorial Hospital, and was buried in Green-Wood Cemetery.

== Sources ==
New York State Senate
Preceded by John F. Furey	New York State Senate; 14th District; 1957–1965	Succeeded by Thomas J. Mackell
Preceded by Manfred Ohrenstein	New York State Senate; 25th District; 1966	Succeeded by Manfred Ohrenstein
Preceded by Jeremiah B. Bloom	New York State Senate; 21st District; 1967–1978	Succeeded by Christopher J. Mega
