= John H. Hughes (politician) =

American politician

John Henry Hughes (April 1, 1904 – October 13, 1972) was an American lawyer and politician from New York.

== Life ==
He was born on April 1, 1904, in Syracuse, New York. He graduated from Syracuse University, and in 1928 from Syracuse University College of Law. He was admitted to the bar in 1929, and practiced law in Syracuse. He married Mary Lorraine Porter (1914–1976), and they had three children.

Hughes was a member of the New York State Senate from 1947 until his death in 1972, sitting in the 166th, 167th, 168th, 169th, 170th, 171st, 172nd, 173rd, 174th, 175th, 176th, 177th, 178th and 179th New York State Legislatures. He was Chairman of the Committee on the Judiciary from 1966 to 1972.

He was an alternate delegate to the 1948, 1952, 1956, 1960 and 1964 Republican National Conventions.

He died on October 13, 1972; and was buried at St. Mary's Cemetery in DeWitt, New York.

New York State Senate
Preceded by Richard P. Byrne	New York State Senate; 43rd District; 1947–1954	Succeeded by Henry A. Wise
Preceded by Warren M. Anderson	New York State Senate; 45th District; 1955–1965	Succeeded by Julian B. Erway
Preceded by Kenneth R. Willard	New York State Senate; 53rd District; 1966	Succeeded by William E. Adams
Preceded by Julian B. Erway	New York State Senate; 45th District; 1967–1972	Succeeded by Hugh Douglas Barclay
