= Austin W. Erwin =

American politician (1887–1965)

Austin William Erwin (April 26, 1887 – August 14, 1965) was an American lawyer and politician from New York.

== Life ==
He was born on April 26, 1887, in West Sparta, Livingston County, New York. He attended Geneseo State Normal School and Columbia University.

He was District Attorney of Livingston County from 1924 to 1932; and was president of the New York State District Attorneys Association in 1932.

On February 15, 1944, he was elected to the New York State Senate, to fill the vacancy caused by the resignation of Joe R. Hanley. Erwin was re-elected several times and remained in the State Senate until 1962, sitting in the 164th, 165th, 166th, 167th, 168th, 169th, 170th, 171st, 172nd and 173rd New York State Legislatures. He was Chairman of the Committee on Finance from 1954 to 1962.

He died on August 14, 1965, at his summer residence on Conesus Lake.

== Sources ==
New York State Senate
Preceded by Joe R. Hanley	New York State Senate; 44th District; 1944	Succeeded by Walter W. Stokes
Preceded by Stephen J. Wojtkowiak	New York State Senate; 49th District; 1945–1954	Succeeded by Harry K. Morton
Preceded by Walter J. Mahoney	New York State Senate; 53rd District; 1955–1962	Succeeded by Barber B. Conable, Jr.
