= Thomas J. Cuite =

American politician

Thomas Joseph Cuite (March 4, 1913 – August 9, 1987) was an American politician from New York.

== Biography ==
He was born on March 4, 1913, in Brooklyn, New York City, the son of Thomas F. Cuite. He attended the parochial schools, and graduated from St. Francis College in 1935. Then he joined his father's real estate business. During World War II he served in the U.S. Army Coast Artillery Corps, attaining the rank of lieutenant colonel. He married Kathlyn Killeen, and they had two children.

Cuite was a member of the New York State Senate from 1953 to 1958, sitting in the 169th, 170th and 171st New York State Legislatures.

In November 1958, he ran for Congress in the 12th district but was defeated by the incumbent Republican Francis E. Dorn.

Cuite was a member of the New York City Council from 1960 to 1985, and was majority leader from 1969 to 1985. Closely tied to the Catholic Church—he was an adviser to John Cardinal O'Connor, Terence Cardinal Cooke and Francis Cardinal Spellman—he worked as majority leader with the Catholic archdiocese for a dozen years to block a vote on a proposed city law to guarantee gay rights.

Cuite died on August 9, 1987, in Lutheran Medical Center in Brooklyn, of a heart attack.

== Sources ==
New York State Senate
Preceded by James J. Crawford	New York State Senate; 8th district 1953–1954	Succeeded by Frank D. O'Connor
Preceded by John F. Furey	New York State Senate; 13th district 1955–1958	Succeeded by Frank Composto
New York City Council
Preceded by ?	New York City Council; 20th district ?–1973	Succeeded by Peter Vallone, Sr.
Preceded by David Ross	Majority Leader of the New York City Council; 1969–1985	Succeeded by Peter Vallone, Sr.
