= Robert Watson Pomeroy =

American politician

Member of the New York Senate from the 35th district
- In office January 1, 1966 – December 31, 1966
- Preceded by: Earl E. Boyle
- Succeeded by: James H. Donovan

Member of the New York Senate from the 35th district
- In office January 1, 1965 – December 31, 1965
- Preceded by: Ernest I. Hatfield
- Succeeded by: Dennis R. Coleman

Member of the New York State Assembly from the Dutchess County district
- In office November 4, 1947 – December 31, 1964
- Preceded by: Ernest I. Hatfield
- Succeeded by: Victor C. Waryas

Personal details
- Born: June 21, 1902 Buffalo, New York, U.S.
- Died: January 4, 1989 (aged 86) Millbrook, New York, U.S.
- Party: Republican
- Spouse: Estelle Bassett (m. 1930; died 1988)
- Relations: Theodore M. Pomeroy (grandfather)
- Children: 2
- Education: Hotchkiss School
- Alma mater: Yale University

Robert Watson Pomeroy (June 21, 1902 – January 4, 1989) was an American businessman and politician from New York.

== Early life ==
He was born on June 21, 1902, in Buffalo, New York, the son of Robert Watson Pomeroy, Sr. (1868–1935), a Yale graduate who was an industrialist and financier in Buffalo and New York, and Lucy (née Bemis) Pomeroy (1869–1958), a former president of the Palmetto Garden Club. He attended the Hotchkiss School. He graduated with a Ph.B. from Yale University in 1924.

His paternal grandparents were Elizabeth (née Watson) Pomeroy, and Congressman Theodore M. Pomeroy (1824–1905) who served as the 26th Speaker of the House following Schuyler Colfax and was a close friend of U.S. Secretary of State (under Lincoln) William H. Seward.

== Career ==
After graduating from Yale, he engaged in the management of investments. During World War II he served in the U.S. Army, attaining the rank of captain. After the war he entered politics as a Republican.

Pomeroy was a member of the New York State Assembly (Dutchess Co.) from 1948 to 1964, sitting in the 166th, 167th, 168th, 169th, 170th, 171st, 172nd, 173rd and 174th New York State Legislatures. He was a leading conservationist, and was Chairman of the Joint Legislative Committee on Natural Resources from 1959 to 1965.

He was a member of the New York State Senate in 1965 and 1966; and a delegate to the New York State Constitutional Convention of 1967.

== Personal life ==
In 1930, he married Estelle Condit Bassett (1907–1988), the daughter of Carroll Phillips Bassett and Margaret (née Condit) Bassett. Together, they were the parents of two children:

- Marnie Pomeroy (b. 1932), a Sarah Lawrence College graduate who moved to Ottawa, Canada and co-founded The Ladysmith Press.
- Robert Watson Pomeroy III (b. 1935)

He died on January 4, 1989, at his home in Millbrook, New York, of heart failure; and was buried at St. Peter's Episcopal Cemetery in Lithgow.

New York State Assembly
Preceded by Ernest I. Hatfield	New York State Assembly; Dutchess County; 1948–1964	Succeeded by Victor C. Waryas
New York State Senate
Preceded by Ernest I. Hatfield	New York State Senate; 35th District; 1965	Succeeded by Dennis R. Coleman
Preceded by Earl E. Boyle	New York State Senate; 44th District; 1966	Succeeded by James H. Donovan
