= Joseph E. Marine =

American politician

Joseph E. Marine (December 19, 1905 – January 25, 1998) was an American politician from New York.

== Life ==
He was born on December 19, 1905, in Manhattan, New York City. He attended DeWitt Clinton High School, the College of the City of New York, New York University School of Public Administration and the Pace Institute of Accounting. Then he became a claims adjuster in the office of the New York City Comptroller. In 1932, he married Josephine Del Genio (died 1997), and they had one son. He was Ticket Manager of the New York Yankees from 1946 to 1951. He was Executive Assistant to Lt. Gov. George B. DeLuca from 1955 to 1958.

Marine was a member of the New York State Senate (29th D.) from 1961 to 1965, sitting in the 173rd, 174th and 175th New York State Legislatures. In September 1965, after re-apportionment, he ran in the 34th District for re-nomination, but was defeated in the Democratic primary by Harrison J. Goldin. Afterwards he moved to Oceanside, New York, and became a business executive.

He died on January 25, 1998, in Oakwood Health Facility in Amherst, Erie County, New York.

New York State Senate
| Preceded by Joseph F. Periconi | New York State Senate; 29th District; 1961–1965 | Succeeded by Manfred Ohrenstein |
