= Edwyn E. Mason =

American politician

Edwyn E. Mason (February 6, 1913 – July 9, 2003) was an American lawyer and politician from New York.

== Life ==
He was born on February 6, 1913, in De Peyster, St. Lawrence County, New York. He attended school and high school in Ogdensburg. He graduated B.Sc. from Oswego State Teachers College in 1938. He graduated from Albany Law School, was admitted to the bar, and practiced law in Hobart, Delaware County, New York.In 1941, he married Melva Bettinger, and they had two children.

Mason was a member of the New York State Assembly from 1953 to 1972, sitting in the 169th, 170th, 171st, 172nd, 173rd, 174th, 175th, 176th, 177th, 178th and 179th New York State Legislatures. He was an alternate delegate to the 1960 Republican National Convention.

He was a member of the New York State Senate from 1973 to 1978, sitting in the 180th, 181st and 182nd New York State Legislatures. Afterwards he moved to Zephyrhills, Florida.

He died on July 9, 2003, in Zephyrhills, Florida.

New York State Assembly
Preceded by Elmer J. Kellam	New York State Assembly; Delaware County; 1953–1965	Succeeded by district abolished
Preceded by new district	New York State Assembly; 124th District; 1966	Succeeded by Francis J. Boland, Jr.
Preceded by Frank P. Cox	New York State Assembly; 113th District; 1967–1972	Succeeded by Harold C. Luther
New York State Senate
Preceded by William T. Smith	New York State Senate; 48th District; 1973–1978	Succeeded by Charles D. Cook
