= Alexander A. Falk =

American politician

Alexander Alfred Falk (January 15, 1900 – January 13, 1975) was an American lawyer and politician from New York.

== Life ==
He was born on January 15, 1900, in New York City, the son of Alderman Joseph Falk (died 1966) and Fannie (Goodman) Falk. He attended Public School No. 132 and George Washington High School. During World War I, he enlisted in the U.S. Navy. He graduated from Fordham Law School in 1923, was admitted to the bar in 1925, and practiced law in New York City. On May 15, 1926, he married Edith Flavelle (1902–1985).

Falk was a member of the New York State Assembly (New York Co., 23rd D.) in 1927, 1928, 1929, 1930, 1931, 1932 and 1933. In November 1933, Falk ran for re-election, but was defeated by Republican William R. Lieberman.

Falk was again a member of the State Assembly in 1935, and was Chairman of the Committee on Taxation and Retrenchment. He was an Alderman of New York City from 1936 to 1937; and a delegate to the New York State Constitutional Convention of 1938.

He was a member of the New York State Senate from 1941 to 1947, sitting in the 163rd, 164th, 165th and 166th New York State Legislatures. In May 1947, he resigned his seat and was appointed by Gov. Thomas E. Dewey to the New York State Civil Service Commission.

Falk was a member of the Civil Service Commission from 1947 to 1969, and was President of the Commission from 1955 to 1959.

He died on January 13, 1975, in Margaretville, New York; and was buried at the Margaretville Cemetery Annex.

== Sources ==
New York State Assembly
Preceded by A. Spencer Feld	New York State Assembly; New York County, 23rd District; 1927–1933	Succeeded by William R. Lieberman
Preceded by William R. Lieberman	New York State Assembly; New York County, 23rd District; 1935	Succeeded by William J. A. Glancy
New York State Senate
Preceded by A. Spencer Feld	New York State Senate; 20th District; 1941–1944	Succeeded by Frederic R. Coudert, Jr.
Preceded by John J. Dunnigan	New York State Senate; 23rd District; 1945–1947	Succeeded by Joseph Zaretzki
