= William Rosenblatt =

American lawyer and politician

William Rosenblatt (October 3, 1906 – May 22, 1999) was an American lawyer and politician from New York.

== Life ==
He was born on October 3, 1906, in New York City, the son of Julius Rosenblatt and Tillie Rosenblatt. He graduated from New York University School of Law. He married Dorothy Richman (born c. 1908), and their son was Barry J. Rosenblatt (born c. 1937).

Rosenblatt was a member of the New York State Senate (16th D.) from 1945 to 1970, sitting in the 165th, 166th, 167th, 168th, 169th, 170th, 171st, 172nd, 173rd, 174th, 175th, 176th, 177th and 178th New York State Legislatures. He was Chairman of the Committee on the Judiciary in 1965.

He died on May 22, 1999. He was Jewish.

== Sources ==
New York State Senate
Preceded by James G. Donovan	New York State Senate; 16th District; 1945–1970	Succeeded by Donald Halperin
