= Edward J. Speno =

American politician

Member of the New York State Senate
- In office January 1, 1955 – February 17, 1971
- Preceded by: Seymour Halpern
- Succeeded by: George A. Murphy
- Constituency: 4th district (1955-1965); 5th district (1966); 4th district (1967-1971)

Personal details
- Born: September 23, 1920 Syracuse, New York
- Died: February 17, 1971 (aged 50) Albany, New York
- Party: Republican
- Spouse: Audrey Bernichon
- Children: 4

Edward J. Speno (September 23, 1920 – February 17, 1971) was an American lawyer and politician from New York.

== Biography ==
Speno was born on September 23, 1920, in Syracuse, New York. He attended the public and parochial schools in Auburn, New York. He graduated from Niagara University in 1942. During World War II he served in the U.S. Navy.

After the war, Speno graduated from Cornell Law School. In 1946, he married Audrey Bernichon, and they had four children. In 1949, they moved to East Meadow, New York, and practiced law there.

Speno was a member of the New York State Senate from 1955 until his death in 1971, sitting in the 170th, 171st, 172nd, 173rd, 174th, 175th, 176th, 177th, 178th and 179th New York State Legislatures. He was Chairman of the Republican Conference of the State Senate.

In 1969, Speno announced that he would run for the United States Senate, vying to take the seat then held by Charles E. Goodell. However, he eventually dropped out of the race, after Governor Nelson Rockefeller and other Republican officials urged him to do so.

=== Death and legacy ===
Speno died during the legislative session on February 17, 1971, in St. Peter's Hospital in Albany, New York, of a heart attack. He was survived by his wife, Audrey, and their four children.

Senator Speno Memorial Park in East Meadow is named in his honor.

=== Personal life ===
Speno was married to his wife, Audrey. They had four children and resided in East Meadow, New York.

== See also ==
- John D. Caemmerer
- Michael J. Tully Jr.

New York State Senate
Preceded by Seymour Halpern	New York State Senate; 4th District; 1955–1965	Succeeded by Henry M. Curran
Preceded by Jack E. Bronston	New York State Senate; 5th District; 1966	Succeeded by John D. Caemmerer
Preceded by Henry M. Curran	New York State Senate; 4th District; 1967–1971	Succeeded by George A. Murphy
