= John F. Furey =

American politician

John F. Furey (April 8, 1906 – December 22, 1973) was an American lawyer and politician from New York.

== Early life and education ==
John F. Furey was born on April 8, 1906. He attended Boys High School and Columbia College; and graduated from Fordham Law School in 1929.

== Career ==
Furey practiced law at 32 Court Street in Brooklyn, New York City.

=== New York State Constitutional Convention ===
Furey was a delegate to the New York State Constitutional Convention of 1938. He was District Leader of the Sunset Park Democratic Organization from 1939 to 1958.

=== New York State Assembly ===
On March 11, 1941, he was elected to the New York State Assembly (Kings County, 7th D.), to fill the vacancy which resulted from the resignation of William Kirnan. Furey was re-elected twice and remained in the State Assembly until 1946, sitting in the 163rd, 164th and 165th New York State Legislatures. On February 20, 1946, he married Mary E. Downing, and they had two children: Mary and John. In November 1946, Furey ran for the State Senate, but was defeated by Republican C. Corey Mills. In November 1948, Furey defeated Mills who ran for re-election.

=== New York State Senate ===
Furey was a member of the New York State Senate from 1949 to 1956, sitting in the 167th, 168th, 169th and 170th New York State Legislatures. In November 1956, he ran for re-election, but was defeated by Republican William T. Conklin.

=== New York City Magistrate ===
In April 1958, Furey was appointed by Mayor Robert F. Wagner, Jr. as a New York City Magistrate. In 1962, the City Magistrates became Judges of the New York City Criminal Court. He was re-appointed in 1967 by Mayor John V. Lindsay.

=== Inquiry ===
In 1968, Furey was subject of an inquiry, and his removal from the bench was demanded, because he had allegedly given his tacit approval of disruptive court tactics by Black Panther suspects. Nothing came of it, and Furey remained on the bench until his death in 1973.

== Death ==
He died on December 21, 1973.

== Sources ==
New York State Assembly
Preceded by William Kirnan	New York State Assembly; Kings County, 7th District; 1941–1946	Succeeded by Louis Kalish
New York State Senate
Preceded by C. Corey Mills	New York State Senate; 13th District; 1949–1954	Succeeded by Thomas J. Cuite
Preceded by Mario M. DeOptatis	New York State Senate; 14th District; 1955–1956	Succeeded by William T. Conklin
