= Samuel L. Greenberg =

American politician

Samuel L. Greenberg (November 12, 1898 – April 24, 1992) was an American lawyer and politician from New York.

== Life ==
Greenberg was born on November 12, 1898, in New York City. He graduated from Public School No. 149 in 1911; from Boys High School in 1914; from Columbia College; and from New York University School of Law in 1919. During World War I he served in the U.S. Navy. He married Esther (died 1987), and their only child was Gloria Mae (Greenberg) St. Lifer.

Greenberg was a member of the New York State Senate from 1943 to 1972, sitting in the 164th, 165th, 166th, 167th, 168th, 169th, 170th, 171st, 172nd, 173rd, 174th, 175th, 176th, 177th, 178th and 179th legislatures. He was Chairman of the Committee on Finance in 1965.

He was an alternate delegate to the 1948 and 1952 Democratic National Conventions.

He died on April 24, 1992. He was Jewish.

== Sources ==
New York State Senate
Preceded by Joseph A. Esquirol	New York State Senate; 8th District; 1943–1944	Succeeded by John J. Crawford
Preceded by Elmer F. Quinn	New York State Senate; 12th District; 1945–1954	Succeeded by Fred G. Moritt
Preceded by John G. Macdonald	New York State Senate; 17th District; 1955–1965	Succeeded by James H. Shaw, Jr.
Preceded by Jerome L. Wilson	New York State Senate; 22nd District; 1966	Succeeded by William J. Ferrall
Preceded by William C. Thompson	New York State Senate; 19th District; 1967–1972	Succeeded by Jeremiah B. Bloom
