= Walter J. Mahoney =

American politician

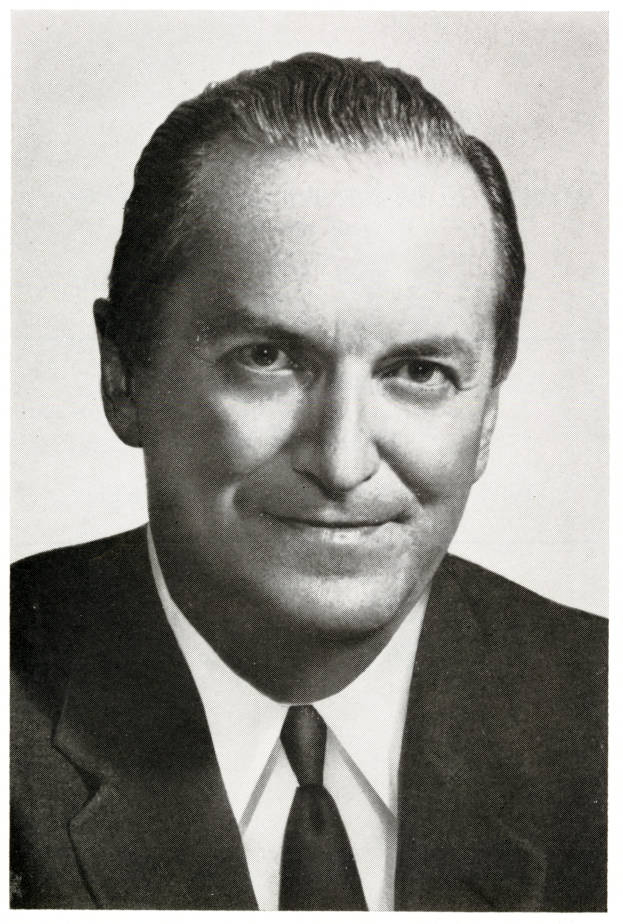

Walter J. Mahoney (March 10, 1908 in Buffalo, New York – March 1, 1982) was an American lawyer and politician.

== Life ==
He graduated from Canisius College in 1930, and from the University at Buffalo Law School. He was admitted to the bar in 1934, and practiced law in Buffalo. While studying law, he was a reporter for the Buffalo Times.

He attended on October 2, 1932, in a vacant storefront in the old Gerron's Building in Buffalo, the first meeting of the Association of New York State Young Republican Clubs. The association was incorporated in 1934 and in 1935 Mahoney was elected president, a post he resigned after he was elected to the New York State Senate.

He was a member of the New York State Senate from 1937 to 1964, sitting in the 160th, 161st, 162nd, 163rd, 164th, 165th, 166th, 167th, 168th, 169th, 170th, 171st, 172nd, 173rd and 174th New York State Legislatures; and was Temporary President of the State Senate from 1954 to 1964. He was also Acting Lieutenant Governor of New York in 1954.

He was a delegate to the 1956, 1960 and 1964 Republican National Conventions.

In 1965 he was appointed by Gov. Nelson Rockefeller to the New York State Thruway Authority. In 1967, he was elected as a justice of the New York Supreme Court (8th D.), and in 1974 he was designated to the Appellate Division (4th Dept.). He retired in 1977, and resumed his private practice in Buffalo.

The Walter J. Mahoney State Office Building at 65 Court Street, in his hometown Buffalo, was named after him.

== Sources ==
- Walter J. Mahoney (1908-1982) at the Historical Society of the New York Courts

New York State Senate
Preceded by David E. Doyle	New York State Senate; 48th District; 1937–1944	Succeeded by Earle S. Warner
Preceded by new district	New York State Senate; 53rd District; 1945–1954	Succeeded by Austin W. Erwin
Preceded by John H. Cooke	New York State Senate; 55th District; 1955–1964	Succeeded by John H. Doerr
Political offices
Preceded by Arthur H. Wicks; Acting	Lieutenant Governor of New York; Acting; 1954	Succeeded by George DeLuca
Preceded by Arthur H. Wicks	Temporary President of the State Senate; 1954–1964	Succeeded by Joseph Zaretzki
