= Earl Brydges =

American politician (1905–1975)

Earl W. Brydges
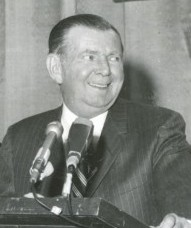

Temporary President and Majority Leader of the New York State Senate
- In office January 1, 1966 – December 31, 1972
- Preceded by: Joseph Zaretzki
- Succeeded by: Warren M. Anderson

Member of the New York State Senate from the 52nd district
- In office January 1, 1949 – December 31, 1972
- Preceded by: William Bewley
- Succeeded by: Lloyd Paterson (redistricting)
- Constituency: 52nd district (1949-1954); 54th district (1955-1965); 60th district (1966); 52nd district (1967-1972)

Personal details
- Born: Earl William Brydges; May 25, 1905 Niagara Falls, New York, U.S.
- Died: March 30, 1975 (aged 69) Lewiston, New York, U.S.
- Party: Republican
- Spouse: Eleanor C. Mahoney
- Children: 7
- Education: Niagara University; University at Buffalo Law School

Earl William Brydges (May 25, 1905 – March 30, 1975) was an American lawyer and politician from New York. He was Temporary President and Majority Leader of the State Senate from 1966 to 1972.

== Early life ==
Earl William Brydges was born on May 25, 1905, in Niagara Falls, New York. He graduated from Niagara University and the University at Buffalo law school in 1926. Later he served for many years on Niagara University's board of trustees. He was admitted to the bar in 1927.

== Career ==
Brydges served on the Board of Education in Wilson, New York, during the 1940s. He also was active in educational advocacy organizations in Western New York.

He was a member of the New York State Senate from 1949 to 1972, sitting in the 167th, 168th, 169th, 170th, 171st, 172nd, 173rd, 174th, 175th, 176th, 177th, 178th and 179th New York State Legislatures.

For the majority of his Senate career, Brydges focused mainly on educational policy and mental health issues. His focus within the area of mental health was on improving services for the intellectually disabled and special education students. His education policy focus was on K-12 education policy statewide. Brydges served as Chairman of the Senate Education Committee and Chairman of the Senate Special Committee on Mental Health.

=== Senate Majority Leader ===
In 1965, when the Republican Party lost the majority in the State Senate for the only time since 1939, Brydges was elected Minority Leader of the Senate. Court ordered voting rights redistricting lead to senators serving one year terms in 1965 and 1966. The Republican Party regained the majority in 1966, and Brydges became Majority Leader. He was a delegate to the New York State Constitutional Convention of 1967.

As Majority Leader, Brydges worked closely with Gov. Nelson Rockefeller on policy development and legislation. His main focus continued on educational issues, along with upstate economic development. He worked with Rockefeller to create the State University of New York system and to develop new school state aid funding formulas. Brydges worked with Rockfeller in the creation of new state agencies and reorganization of the New York City mass transit system. As Majority Leader, Brydges remained an advocate for Western New York and tourism development in Niagara County. He was an early supporter of casino gambling in Niagara Falls. In 1972, Brydges successfully passed legislation to legalize casino gaming in New York State through an amendment to the state constitution. The casino amendment did not pass in the end, since the state constitution requires the passage of legislation in two consecutive legislative sessions and then passage of the majority of the state's voters in a statewide referendum. Brydges' vision in the area of casino gaming was realized with the opening of the Seneca Niagara Casino on January 1, 2003.

Brydges was a fierce opponent of reproductive rights and blocked legislation to legalize abortion in New York. In 1970, Brydges allowed the Senate to vote on legislation to legalize abortion. He did so under the belief the Senate would not pass the bill. When the Senate surprised him and passed the bill, which had already passed the Assembly and had the support of Governor Rockefeller, Brydges reportedly sat in his Senate chair and wept.

=== Acting Governor of New York ===
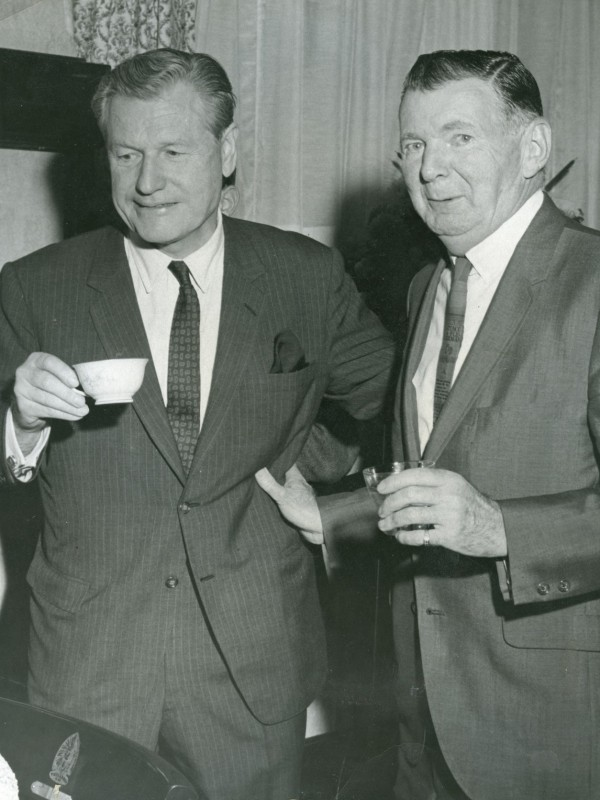
Gov. Nelson Rockefeller and Majority Leader Earl Brydges

In 1972, both Rockefeller and Lt. Gov. Malcolm Wilson left the state on the same afternoon. Under the state constitution, this made Brydges the Acting Governor of New York for several hours. As acting governor, Brydges signed routine state paperwork and conducted Senate business. He did not sign any legislation into law, including a pending bill relating to Niagara Falls that he had sponsored.

In 1972, Brydges did not seek reelection to the Senate and he retired on January 1, 1973.

== Personal life ==
He married Eleanor C. Mahoney. Together, they had five sons and two daughters, including:

- Earl W. Brydges Jr., who married Martha Ann Shalala in 1967.
- Dennis Brydges, who married Evelyn Olson in 1967
- Thomas Eugene Brydges, who married Melissa MacLeod May in 1990.
- William Brydges
- Margaret Brydges

Brydges died of cancer in 1975 and his funeral was attended by then Vice President Rockefeller. This was Rockefeller's first visit to Upstate New York as vice president.

=== Honors ===
The Earl W. Brydges Artpark in Lewiston, New York, an outdoor theater and concert center that he championed, was named in his honor. In addition, the main public library in Niagara Falls, the Earl W. Brydges Library, designed by architect Paul Rudolph, was named after him.

== General Reference ==
- Earl W. Brydges Papers. M.E. Grenander Department of Special Collections and Archives, University Libraries, University at Albany, State University of New York (hereafter referred to as the Brydges Papers).

New York State Senate
Preceded by William Bewley	New York State Senate; 52nd District; 1949–1954	Succeeded by George T. Manning
Preceded by Stanley J. Bauer	New York State Senate; 54th District; 1955–1965	Succeeded by Theodore D. Day
Preceded by new district	New York State Senate; 60th District; 1966	Succeeded by district abolished
Preceded by Tarky Lombardi Jr.	New York State Senate; 52nd District; 1967–1972	Succeeded by Frederick L. Warder
Political offices
Preceded by Joseph Zaretzki	Minority Leader in the New York State Senate; 1965	Succeeded by Joseph Zaretzki
Preceded by Joseph Zaretzki	Temporary President of the State Senate; 1966–1972	Succeeded by Warren M. Anderson
