= George R. Metcalf =

American politician

George Rich Metcalf (February 5, 1914 – May 30, 2002) was an American publisher, newspaper editor, book author and politician from New York.

== Life ==
He was born on February 5, 1914, in Auburn, Cayuga County, New York, the son of Edwin Flint Metcalf and Bertha (Rich) Metcalf. He graduated from Northwood School in 1932, from Princeton University in 1936; and from Columbia University Graduate School of Journalism in 1937. In 1938, he opened The Auburn Press, a publishing company. On August 19, 1939, he married Elizabeth Ann Bradley (1915–2004), and they had five children. In December 1941, he closed his publishing house, and instead joined the U.S. Army as a second lieutenant. He fought in France in 1944 and 1945, and was awarded the Silver Star. After the war he wrote for the Auburn Citizen–Advertiser.

In 1950, Metcalf defeated the incumbent State Senator Henry W. Griffith in the Republican primary, and went on to win the election in November. He was a member of the New York State Senate from 1951 to 1965, sitting in the 168th, 169th, 170th, 171st, 172nd, 173rd, 174th and 175th New York State Legislatures.

In 1968, he ran in the 35th District for Congress, but was defeated by Democrat Samuel S. Stratton. Afterwards Metcalf taught history at Auburn Community College, was chairman of the Board of his family's Columbian Rope Company, and was a director of the Auburn National Bank.

He died on May 30, 2002, in Auburn Memorial Hospital in Auburn, New York; and was buried at the Fort Hill Cemetery there.

Massachusetts State Senator Edwin D. Metcalf was his grandfather.

== Works ==
- Black Profiles (McGraw-Hill Publishing, 1968, 405 pg., biographies of notable African-Americans)
- Up From Within (McGraw-Hill Publishing, 1971)
- From Little Rock to Boston (Greenwood Press, 1983)
- Fair Housing Comes of Age (Greenwood Press, 1988)

== Sources ==
New York State Senate
Preceded by Henry W. Griffith	New York State Senate; 47th District; 1951–1954	Succeeded by Warren M. Anderson
Preceded by Harry K. Morton	New York State Senate; 48th District; 1955–1965	Succeeded by Ronald B. Stafford
