= George L. Ingalls =

American politician

George Lewis Ingalls (June 7, 1914 – April 10, 2001) was an American lawyer and politician from New York.

== Life ==
He was born on June 7, 1914, in Danielson, Windham County, Connecticut, the son of Louis Sessions Ingalls and Mary Ethel (Gallup) Ingalls. He graduated from Amherst College in 1935; and from Syracuse University College of Law in 1939. He practiced law in Binghamton, New York. On December 12, 1942, he married Dorothy M. Joggerst, and they had four children.

Ingalls was a member of the New York State Assembly from 1953 to 1966, sitting in the 169th, 170th, 171st, 172nd, 173rd, 174th, 175th and 176th New York State Legislatures. He was Majority Leader from 1961 to 1964; and Minority Leader in 1965. On December 13, 1965, the Republican Assembly conference elected Perry B. Duryea Jr. as Minority Leader, to replace Ingalls at the beginning of the session of 1966.

He was a Trustee of the New York Power Authority from 1967 to 1990.

He died on April 10, 2001, in Our Lady of Lourdes Hospital in Binghamton, New York; and was buried at the Calvary Cemetery in Johnson City.

== Sources ==
New York State Assembly
Preceded by Orlo M. Brees	New York State Assembly; Broome County, 2nd District; 1953–1965	Succeeded by district abolished
Preceded by new district	New York State Assembly; 125th District; 1966	Succeeded by Constance E. Cook
Political offices
Preceded by Charles A. Schoeneck Jr.	Majority Leader of the New York State Assembly; 1961–1964	Succeeded by Moses M. Weinstein
Preceded by Anthony J. Travia	Minority Leader in the New York State Assembly; 1965	Succeeded by Perry B. Duryea Jr.
