= Manfred Ohrenstein =

American politician (1925–2024)

Member of the New York State Senate from the 25th/29th/27th district
- In office 1961–1994
- Preceded by: John H. Farrell
- Succeeded by: Catherine M. Abate
- Constituency: 25th district (1961-1965, 1967-1972); 29th district (1966); 27th district (1973-1994)

Minority leader of the New York State Senate
- In office 1975–1994
- Preceded by: Joseph Zaretzki
- Succeeded by: Martin Connor

Personal details
- Born: August 5, 1925 Mannheim, Baden, Germany
- Died: November 18, 2024 (aged 99) New York City, U.S.
- Party: Democratic
- Spouse: Marilyn Bacher
- Children: 2
- Education: Brooklyn College (BA); Columbia Law School (JD)

Manfred Ohrenstein (August 5, 1925 – November 18, 2024) was an American lawyer and politician. Counsel to the New York law firm of Ruskin Moscou Faltischek, he was also a member of the New York State Senate. A Democrat, he represented Manhattan from 1961 until 1994. From 1975 until 1994, he served as the New York State Senate minority leader.

== Biography ==
The son of a furniture merchant, Ohrenstein was born in Mannheim, Germany, on August 5, 1925, to Polish-born Jewish parents. In 1938, Ohrenstein and his family fled Nazi Germany and settled in Brownsville, Brooklyn.

Ohrenstein graduated from Brooklyn College in 1948 with a B.A degree, cum laude. He thereafter attended Columbia Law School from 1948 to 1951, where he was designated as a Harlan Fiske Stone Scholar and graduated with the degree of Juris Doctor. From 1952 to 1954, Ohrenstein served in the U.S. Army as a first lieutenant, Judge Advocate General Corps. After leaving active duty he continued to serve in the military as a captain in the U.S. Army Reserve from 1954 to 1960. On leaving active duty he was appointed as an assistant district attorney by the Manhattan District Attorney Frank Hogan and served from 1954 to 1958. He left the New York District Attorney's office in 1958 to resume the practice of law in New York City and in 1983 helped form the law firm of Ohrenstein & Brown, LLP. In addition to New York State, he was admitted to practice before the Court of Military Appeals and the United States Court of Appeals for the Second Circuit. He also became active in New York politics and in 1960 was elected to the New York State Senate representing the West Side of Manhattan. In 1975 he became the Democratic leader of the New York State Senate. In 1980 he also served as chairman of the New York Delegation to the Democratic National Convention which nominated Jimmy Carter for president.

He left the New York Senate at the end of 1994 to resume the practice of law. Thereafter he was appointed by Mayor Rudy Giuliani as a member of the Mayor's Task Force on the City University of New York and subsequently to the Mayoral Task Force on the New York City Board of Elections. He was the vice chairman and a co-founder of the Museum of Jewish Heritage, and vice president of the New York Insurance Federation. Ohrenstein was a member of the board of the New York City chapter of the American Jewish Committee and the advisory board of the Baruch School of Public Affairs.

Ohrenstein and his wife, Dr. Marilyn Bacher, had two children. He died at his home in Manhattan on November 18, 2024, at the age of 99.

== Politics ==
In 1960, Ohrenstein emerged as one of the major leaders of the New York City Democratic reform movement. He joined forces with Eleanor Roosevelt and former governor and U.S. Senator Herbert H. Lehman to organize the Committee for Democratic Voters. The New York Post called Manfred Ohrenstein a "standout example of the new young leadership that is spearheading the drive to reform the Democratic Party." The principal objective of this organization was to oust Carmine DeSapio, the leader of the New York County Democratic organization, otherwise known as Tammany Hall, and elect a Democratic reform leader as county leader. To assist in achieving this objective and to elect a liberal to the New York State Senate, Ohrenstein became a candidate for the Democratic nomination for the 25th district of the New York State Senate against the incumbent State Senator John H. Farrell, who was supported by DeSapio.

Ohrenstein defeated Farrell in the Democratic primary. He then won the general election with about 57 percent of the vote. In a 1965 editorial, The New York Times said "Senator Manfred Ohrenstein is an outstanding Reform legislator who puts principle first." He easily won reelection (often by lopsided margins) until he retired in 1994. Ohrenstein briefly represented the 29th District after a special election in 1965 (when State Senate and Assembly district lines were reapportioned), but the following year was elected to represent the 25th district again. After district boundaries were redrawn after the 1970 census, Ohrenstein began representing the 27th district, which he held until his retirement. He sat in the 173rd, 174th, 175th, 176th, 177th, 178th, 179th, 180th, 181st, 182nd, 183rd, 184th, 185th, 186th, 187th, 188th, 189th and state legislatures. In the senate, Ohrenstein compiled a liberal voting record by supporting anti-discrimination measures protecting gays and lesbians and supporting strict rent control laws.

=== Senate Minority Leader ===
In 1975, Ohrenstein was elected Senate minority leader by his Democratic colleagues. He held the position until his retirement. This was a major victory for the New York City Democratic Reform Movement. He was opposed in this election by the Democratic Governor Hugh Carey and by the Chairman of the New York State Democratic Committee, Patrick J. Cunningham. Several of the new Democratic members of the New York Senate had prevailed as challengers to the incumbents in the primary election of 1974 and voted for Senator Ohrenstein despite the opposition of the then state leadership of the Democratic Party.

=== Legislative achievements ===
Ohrenstein was a major advocate of legislation to abolish the death penalty in New York. In 1965, he introduced Bill S.639 to abolish capital punishment in the state; the bill was passed by the legislation and signed by Governor Nelson Rockefeller on June 1, 1965.

Ohrenstein was a chief sponsor of S.8556, a bill to legalize abortion in New York. Ohrenstein introduced this bill on March 5, 1970. It was co-sponsored by Senator D. Clinton Dominick III, a Republican. It passed the Senate on March 18, 1970, and an amended version of the bill was subsequently passed by the legislature and signed by the governor on April 11, 1970. Three years later the U.S. Supreme Court issued Roe v. Wade.

Ohrenstein became the chairman of the Senate Committee on Mental Health in 1965. He was instrumental in passing legislation (Bill A.6033) to provide greater state aid for the construction of local mental health facilities. It was signed into law by the governor on August 2, 1966.

Ohrenstein was also chairman of the Joint Legislative Committee on Higher Education. Under his leadership this committee achieved major reforms (Bill A.6125) in the administration and financing of the City University of New York, which legislation eventually also included the CUNY SEEK program. A New York Times editorial supported Senator Ohrenstein's recommendations: "After much vacillation Governor Rockefeller has come to the support of the well-conceived legislative plan to assure the fiscal soundness of the City University. The bill follows closely the recommendations that emerged from hearings conducted by State Senator Manfred Ohrenstein."

In his thirty-four years in office, Ohrenstein also championed rent regulations, welfare and civil rights reforms.

=== Bailout of New York City ===
Immediately upon taking office as minority leader on January 1, 1975, Senator Ohrenstein, as one of the four legislative leaders representing the Senate and Assembly, became involved in the successful bailout from the near bankruptcy of the New York State Battery Park Authority and later of the City of New York itself during the 1975/76/77 legislative sessions. In his public papers, Governor Carey acknowledged Senator Ohrenstein's efforts: "I fully support the efforts of Senator Ohrenstein and the Democratic minority of the Senate to provide New York City with the taxing authority it needs to maintain the services so essential to its well-being." Senator Ohrenstein and Republican Majority Leader of the Senate Warren Anderson successfully achieved bipartisan support for these landmark measures. These measures also included the creation of the New York State Financial Control Board and other reforms of the New York City budget process.

=== Indictment and dismissal ===
On September 16, 1987, Manhattan District Attorney Robert Morgenthau indicted Ohrenstein on 564 counts of conspiracy, grand larceny, and other charges related to a scheme to use hundreds of thousands of dollars in state money to assist Democratic State Senate candidates in 1986. Morgenthau alleged that Ohrenstein and his two codefendants, Democratic State Senator Howard E. Babbush of Brooklyn, and Frank Sanzillo, a top aide employed by Ohrenstein, used public money to pay for campaign workers, and that legislative staffers continued to collect their salaries while working full-time on political campaigns. Despite the indictment, Ohrenstein, who pleaded not guilty to all charges, was easily reelected in 1988 and continued to serve as minority leader.

On November 27, 1990, the New York State Court of Appeals dismissed 445 counts against Ohrenstein, stating that "the point we are making in this case is that at the time the defendants acted, their conduct was not prohibited in any manner." On September 5, 1991, at Morgenthau's request, a state judge in Manhattan dismissed the remaining counts against Ohrenstein. In 1992, New York State Comptroller Edward V. Regan awarded Ohrenstein $1.3 million in legal costs (but disallowed $480,000).

== After politics ==
Ohrenstein decided not to seek re-election in 1994. After leaving elected office he engaged in the full-time practice of law at Ruskin Moscou Faltischek, P.C. as part of the firm's municipal and government affairs department. In 1994, Ohrenstein was honored in the Congressional Record by U.S. Representative Carolyn Maloney. She called him a brilliant intellect who is "driven above all by what he believes is right. His progressive values are rock solid. In 34 years of public service, his commitment to equal opportunity for women and minorities, a woman's right to choose, education and civil rights has never wavered."

New York State Senate
Preceded by John H. Farrell	New York State Senate; 25th District; 1961–1965	Succeeded by William T. Conklin
Preceded by Joseph E. Marine	New York State Senate; 29th District; 1966	Succeeded by Eugene Rodriguez
Preceded by William T. Conklin	New York State Senate; 25th District; 1967–1972	Succeeded by Paul P. E. Bookson
Preceded by Sidney A. von Luther	New York State Senate; 27th District; 1973–1994	Succeeded by Catherine Abate
Political offices
Preceded by Joseph Zaretzki	Minority Leader in the New York State Senate; 1975–1994	Succeeded by Martin Connor
