= Max M. Turshen =

American politician

Max M. Turshen (March 2, 1906 – December 19, 1980) was an American lawyer and politician from New York.

== Life ==
He was born on March 2, 1906. He attended Public School No. 147 and Boys High School. He graduated from the College of the City of New York and New York University School of Law. He was admitted to the bar in 1928, and practiced law in New York City. He married Rose Lubin (died 1966), and they had three children.

Turshen was a member of the New York State Assembly from 1937 to 1968, sitting in the 160th, 161st, 162nd, 163rd, 164th, 165th, 166th, 167th, 168th, 169th, 170th, 171st, 172nd, 173rd, 174th, 175th, 176th and 177th New York State Legislatures. He was Chairman of the Committee on the Judiciary from 1965 to 1968.

He died on December 19, 1980, in Brookdale Medical Center in Brooklyn He was Jewish.

New York State Assembly
Preceded by George Kaminsky	New York State Assembly; Kings County, 19th District; 1937–1944	Succeeded by Philip J. Schupler
Preceded by Lewis W. Olliffe	New York State Assembly; Kings County, 1st District; 1945–1965	Succeeded by district abolished
Preceded by new district	New York State Assembly; 43rd District; 1966	Succeeded by George A. Cincotta
Preceded by Shirley Chisholm	New York State Assembly; 45th District; 1967–1968	Succeeded by Stephen J. Solarz
