= Sidney A. von Luther =

United States Virgin Islander politician (1925–1985)

Sidney Albert von Luther (May 5, 1925 – August 15, 1985) was an American politician from New York.

== Life ==
He was born on May 5, 1925, in Charlotte Amalie, on Saint Thomas, in the U.S. Virgin Islands, the son of Carl von Luther. He attended Columbia University, the University of Maryland and the London School of Economics. He served as a hospitalman apprentice in the U.S. Navy. He married Margaret Strakey, and they had one son.

He became active in union and civil rights matters in Harlem. He also entered politics as a Democrat, and was a member of the New York State Senate from 1971 to 1974, sitting in the 179th and 180th New York State Legislatures.

He died on August 15, 1985, at his home in Manhattan; and was buried at the Calverton National Cemetery.

New York State Senate
Preceded by Basil A. Paterson	New York State Senate; 27th District; 1971–1972	Succeeded by Manfred Ohrenstein
Preceded by Joseph Zaretzki	New York State Senate; 28th District; 1973–1974	Succeeded by Carl McCall
