= Joseph Zaretzki =

American politician (1900–1981)

Joseph Zaretzki (March 9, 1900 – December 20, 1981) was an American lawyer and politician from New York. He was Majority Leader of the New York State Senate in 1965, the only Democrat in this position since the adoption of the New York State Constitution of 1938 until Malcolm Smith attained the position in 2009.

== Early life, education, and military service ==
Zaretzki was born on March 9, 1900. He was born in Warsaw and came to the United States in childhood. He served in the U.S. Army during World War I. He graduated from Columbia College and Columbia Law School. He was Jewish.

== Career ==
Zaretzki practiced law in Upper Manhattan and entered politics toward the end of the Great Depression, and rose within Tammany Hall, becoming a district leader.

In November 1947, he was elected to the New York State Senate, to fill the vacancy caused by the appointment of Alexander A. Falk as Civil Service Commissioner. Zaretzki represented the Washington Heights area of Manhattan from 1948 to 1974, sitting in the 166th, 167th, 168th, 169th, 170th, 171st, 172nd, 173rd, 174th, 175th, 176th, 177th, 178th, 179th and 180th New York State Legislatures. He was the Democratic Minority Leader from 1957 to 1964, and from 1966 to 1974.

As a state senator, Zaretzki could be both "fiery and humorous"; he once called for Governor Nelson A. Rockefeller to be impeached, but later admitted that "he had merely intended to capture the interest of spectators in the gallery." New York Times editorial board member William V. Shannon said, "To call Zaretzki a hack, would be undue praise." Zaretzki was allied to Mayor Robert F. Wagner Jr. and Tammany Hall leader J. Raymond Jones; he was opposed by the Reform Democrats and anti-Wagner Democrats, who sought to block Zaretzki from power in the state Senate.

In 1965, the Democratic Party achieved for the only time since 1938 a majority in the State Senate, but the Democratic senators were divided in two factions, 15 senators allied with Mayor of New York City Robert F. Wagner Jr., and 18 senators allied with U.S. Senator Robert F. Kennedy. After a month of deadlock, Zaretzki—the long-time Minority Leader—was elected Temporary President on February 3 with the votes of the Wagner men and the Republicans who had voted for Earl W. Brydges, but were urged by Governor Nelson A. Rockefeller to end the deadlock.

Zaretzki's political career ended in 1974, when Franz S. Leichter defeated him in the Democratic primary election. Leichter, a state assemblyman, was from the Reform wing of the Democratic Party and was nearly three decades younger than Zaretzki. After his defeat, Zaretzki returned to the private practice of law.

== Death ==
Zaretzki suffered a series of strokes toward the end of his life. He died on December 20, 1981, in Beth Abraham Hospital in the Bronx.

== Sources ==
New York State Senate
Preceded by Alexander A. Falk	New York State Senate; 23rd District; 1948–1965	Succeeded by Irwin R. Brownstein
Preceded by Royden A. Letsen	New York State Senate; 32nd District; 1966	Succeeded by Abraham Bernstein
Preceded by Whitney North Seymour Jr.	New York State Senate; 28th District; 1967–1972	Succeeded by Sidney A. von Luther
Preceded by Robert García	New York State Senate; 29th District; 1973–1974	Succeeded by Franz S. Leichter
Political offices
Preceded by Francis J. Mahoney	Minority Leader in the New York State Senate; 1957–1964	Succeeded by Earl W. Brydges
Preceded by Walter J. Mahoney	Temporary President of the State Senate; 1965	Succeeded by Earl W. Brydges
Preceded by Earl W. Brydges	Minority Leader in the New York State Senate; 1966–1974	Succeeded by Manfred Ohrenstein
