= Francis J. Mahoney =

American politician

Francis J. Mahoney (1897 – December 23, 1956) was an American lawyer and politician from New York.

== Life ==
He was born in 1897. He graduated from Manhattan College in 1918; and from Fordham Law School. He married Catherine, and they had two daughters: Patricia (Mahoney) Cavallero and Maureen (Mahoney) Rice (1928–2012).

Mahoney was a member of the New York State Senate from 1943 until his death in 1956, sitting in the 164th, 165th, 166th, 167th, 168th, 169th and 170th New York State Legislatures. He was Minority Leader from 1952 to 1956.

He died on December 23, 1956, in St. Luke's Hospital in Manhattan, after a stomach operation.

His daughter Patricia (1925–2007) was married to Gene J. Cavallero Jr., co-owner of The Colony restaurant.

== Sources ==
New York State Senate
Preceded by Phelps Phelps	Member of the New York State Senate from the 13th district 1943–1944	Succeeded by William Kirnan
Preceded by Charles D. Perry	Member of the New York State Senate from the 19th district 1945–1954	Succeeded by Edward V. Curry
Preceded by Arthur Wachtel	Member of the New York State Senate from the 25th district 1955–1956	Succeeded by John H. Farrell
Preceded by Elmer F. Quinn	Minority Leader of the New York State Senate; 1952–1956	Succeeded by Joseph Zaretzki
