= John H. Farrell =

American politician

John H. Farrell (October 23, 1919 – April 20, 1995) was an American lawyer and politician from New York.

== Life ==
He was born on October 23, 1919, in Manhattan, New York City. He attended St. Columba School and Xavier High School. He graduated from Fordham College and Fordham Law School. He practiced law in New York City and entered politics as a Democrat. He married Ellen K. Stanton (died 2007), and they had three sons. He was employed as a research counsel by State Senate Minority Leader Francis J. Mahoney.

Farrell was elected in November 1955 to the New York State Assembly, to fill the vacancy caused by the appointment of John J. Mangan to the Municipal Court, and took his seat in the 170th New York State Legislature at the beginning of the session of 1956. He was re-elected in November 1956, and took his seat in the 171st New York State Legislature on January 9, 1957. He was elected on February 14, 1957, to the New York State Senate (25th D.), to fill the vacancy caused by the death of Francis J. Mahoney. He resigned his seat in the Assembly on February 27, when the result of the special election was certified, and took his seat in the State Senate. He was re-elected in November 1958, and remained in the Senate until the end of the 172nd New York State Legislature in 1960. On June 7, 1960, Farrell ran for re-nomination, but was defeated in the Democratic primary by Manfred Ohrenstein. In November 1960, Farrell ran on the Liberal ticket for re-election, but was defeated by Ohrenstein.

On March 24, 1962, Farrell was elected as Chairman of the New York County Democratic Executive Committee, to succeed Carmine DeSapio.

In 1965, Farrell moved to Cohoes, Albany County, New York, the hometown of his wife.

He died on April 20, 1995, at his home in Cohoes; and was buried at the St. Agnes Cemetery in Menands.

== Sources ==
New York State Assembly
Preceded by John J. Mangan	New York State Senate; New York County, 3rd District; 1956–1957	Succeeded by Francis W. Doheny
New York State Senate
Preceded by Francis J. Mahoney	New York State Senate; 25th District; 1957–1960	Succeeded by Manfred Ohrenstein
