= Victor C. Waryas =

American politician

Member of the New York State Assembly from the 98th district
- In office January 1, 1967 – December 31, 1968
- Preceded by: Thomas J. McInerney
- Succeeded by: Emeel S. Betros

Member of the New York State Assembly from the 108th district
- In office January 1, 1966 – December 31, 1966
- Preceded by: District created
- Succeeded by: Louis E. Wolfe

Member of the New York State Assembly from the Dutchess district
- In office January 1, 1965 – December 31, 1965
- Preceded by: Robert Watson Pomeroy
- Succeeded by: District abolished

Personal details
- Born: February 28, 1915 Poughkeepsie, New York, U.S.
- Died: November 2, 1976 (aged 61) Poughkeepsie, New York, U.S.
- Party: Democratic

Victor C. Waryas (February 28, 1915 – November 2, 1976) was an American politician who served in the New York State Assembly from 1965 to 1968.

He died on November 2, 1976, in Poughkeepsie, New York at age 61.
