= Kittian and Nevisian Americans =

Americans of Kittitian and Nevisian birth or descent

Kittitian and Nevisian Americans
Total population
- 7,846 alone or in any combination 6,038 alone

Regions with significant populations
- Massachusetts; Connecticut; New York; Pennsylvania; New Jersey; Delaware; Maryland; Virginia; North Carolina; Georgia; Florida; Minnesota; Texas; Washington; Colorado; California

Languages
- English, Saint Kitts Creole

Religion
- Christianity

Kittitian and Nevisian Americans are Americans of Saint Kitts and Nevis ancestry, or Americans that were born in Saint Kitts and Nevis.

== Demographics ==
The counties with the largest Kittitian and Nevisian population is Kings County, New York and Queens County, New York.

== Notable people ==
- Bertram L. Baker, former member of the New York State Assembly
- Rupert Crosse, actor; first African American to be nominated for the Best Supporting Actor Academy Award
- Louis Farrakhan, Nation of Islam leader
- Alexander Hamilton, 1st United States Secretary of the Treasury
- Akeel Morris, professional baseball player
- Constance Baker Motley, civil rights activist, judge, and politician
- Diane Patrick, lawyer and former First Lady of Massachusetts
- Tregenza Roach, Lieutenant Governor of the U.S. Virgin Islands
- Neil Strauss, author of The Game: Penetrating the Secret Society of Pickup Artists
- Susan L. Taylor, former editor-in-chief of Essence
- Bill Thompson, New York City politician
- Cicely Tyson, actress who was inducted into the Television Hall of Fame
- Neil deGrasse Tyson, astrophysicist, science communicator, and director of the Hayden Planetarium
- John Gorrie, credited inventor of mechanical refrigeration

== See also ==
- Saint Kitts and Nevis–United States relations
