= Rafalca =

Dressage horse

- Breed: Oldenburg
- Sire: Argentinus (Hanoverian)
- Grandsire: Argentan I (Hanoverian)
- Dam: Ratine (Oldenburg)
- Maternal grandsire: Rubinstein I (Westphalian)
- Sex: Mare
- Foaled: 1997
- Country: Germany (birth); United States (standing)
- Colour: Bay
- Breeder: Erwin Risch
- Owner: Jan Ebeling; Ann Romney
- Trainer: Jan Ebeling
- Last updated on: 13 July 2023.

Rafalca (born 1997) is a former dressage horse, co-owned by Ann Romney, that performed in the equestrian competition at the 2012 Summer Olympics, with rider (and co-owner/trainer) Jan Ebeling. She was retired from competitions in 2014, and is now a broodmare.

Rafalca is a bay Oldenburg mare, born in Menslage in Germany in 1997, and bred by Erwin Risch.

== Ancestry ==
Rafalca's sire was Argentinus (1980 – 2007), a Hanoverian show jumping stallion; her dam, Ratine (b. 1990), was an Oldenburg. Her damsire was Rubinstein I (1986 – 2000), an accomplished Westphalian stallion who achieved 40 wins at the Grand Prix level in dressage, and was a member of the 1996 Olympic dressage team. Rubenstein's dam, Antine, was a full sister to three-time Olympic competitor Amon, and two-time Olympic champion Ahlerich, the latter under German rider Reiner Klimke.

Rubenstein I's sire, the Westphalian stallion Rosenkavalier (b. 1980), was a male-line descendant of Ramzes (b. 1937), a Polish Anglo-Arabian stallion by the Belgian-bred Thoroughbred and successful racehorse Rittersporn (b. 1917) - a male-line descendant of the English Thoroughbred racing stallion Herod (b. 1758), of the Byerley Turk line - out of a Shagya Arabian mare, Jordi (b. 1928). Ramzes was an influential warmblood sire of show jumping and dressage horses who stood at various studs, including the Janów Podlaski Stud Farm in Poland, and would go on to have a strong influence on the Westphalian, Holsteiner, and other German warmblood horse breeds.

Despite being an Anglo-Arabian, Ramzes is primarily seen as a carrier of Thoroughbred blood:

"The marvellously positive results were doubtless due to the large percentage of Thoroughbred blood carried by Ramzes himself…Ramzes' influence in Holstein seems to have achieved its greatest importance with the whole list of first class approved broodmares which carry his blood. On his dam's side, Ramzes carried a great deal of Amurath blood; however, his offspring did not show any Amurath characteristics. This is probably due to the large percentage of Thoroughbred blood. The hereditary Amurath tendency to produce pacing, which did not necessarily nullify jumping ability as seen in the Argram line of the Hanoverian breed, never occurred in Holstein."

— Romedio Graf von Thun-Hohenstein, The Holsteiner horse: History, breeding, performance (1993)

Rubenstein I descended from Radetsky (b. 1951), a son of Ramzes out of Malta (b. 1942), a Westphalian mare who was by the German Trakehner stallion Oxyd (b. 1924) out of the native Westphalian mare Meerfahrt (b. 1937). Malta's bloodlines included English Thoroughbred descendants of the racing stallions King Fergus (b. 1775), a son of Eclipse (b. 1764), a male-line descendant of the Darley Arabian; Potoooooooo, or "Pot-8-Os" (b. 1773), a nephew of King Fergus, and a grandson of Eclipse; Herod (b. 1758), of the Byerley Turk line; and other famous racehorses. This is on account of German Trakehner, Westphalian, Oldenburg, Hanoverian, and other German warmblood horse breeders crossing native German mares to English Thoroughbred stallions throughout the 19th century, as well as the first half of the 20th century to produce a better cavalry mount.

The founder of the "R line" of Hanoverians is also considered to be Ramzes, though Rubenstein I is the line's most well-known sire.

Rubenstein I's dam, Antine, was sired by the English Thoroughbred stallion Angelo out of Dodona, a Westphalian mare. Dodona was a descendant of Robert the Devil (1877–1889), an English Thoroughbred racing stallion who famously competed against the Thoroughbred racing stallion Bend Or, but had little impact on the Thoroughbred breed in Great Britain. Through his son, Devil's Own (b. 1887), who stood at the Celle State Stud from 1894 to 1906, Robert the Devil would found the "D line" of Hanoverians, which excelled in dressage. This line is one of the most widespread dressage horse lines in the world today due to his influential male-line descendant, the Oldenburg stallion Donnerhall.

Dodona's ancestor, the Hanoverian stallion Defilant (b. 1896), was by Devil's Own out of Lisawetha, by the German Thoroughbred stallion Landstreicher (b. 1879), also a male-line descendant of English Thoroughbred racing stallion Potoooooooo, or "Pot-8-Os" (b. 1773), a male-line descendant of Eclipse (b. 1764) and the Darley Arabian; Eclipse was by Marske (b. 1750) out of Spilletta (b. 1749), a daughter of Regulus (b. 1739), who was in turn sired by the Godolphin Arabian. Defilant was out of Stute von Tilly, a native Hanoverian mare. Stute von Tilly's line also had influence from other key English Thoroughbred racing stallions, including Regulus (b. 1739); Diomed (b. 1777), a descendant of the Byerley Turk; and Matchem (b. 1748), also a grandson of the Godolphin Arabian through Cade (b. 1734), the half-brother of Regulus.

Rubenstein I's sire, Rosenkavalier (b. 1980), was also out of a "D line" mare, Diva (b. 1973), also descended in the male line from Defilant (b. 1896).

In Rafalca's maternal line, her great-granddam, Falaise (b. 1975), was sired by the Selle Français stallion Furioso II (b. 1965) out of Peggi (b. 1964), a Westphalian mare (Papayer, a Thoroughbred x Fiesta v. Kirchhellen, a Westphalian). Furioso II was by Furioso (b. 1939), a Thoroughbred stallion, out of Dame de Ranville (b. 1947), a Selle Français mare. Furioso (b. 1939), was a male-line descendant of Matchem (b. 1748), grandson of the Godolphin Arabian through Cade (b. 1734), though he also shares the same ancestors of Diomed (b. 1777); Highflyer (b. 1774); King Fergus (b. 1775); et al.

Both of Rafalca's parents, Argentinus (b. 1980) and Ratine (b. 1990), had German Trakehner, Hanoverian, Oldenburg, Westphalian, Mecklenburger, and English Thoroughbred ancestors. Argentinus was also descended in the male line from English Thoroughbred racing stallion Whalebone (b. 1807), grandson of Potoooooooo, or "Pot-8-Os" (b. 1773), a male-line descendant of Eclipse (b. 1764) and the Darley Arabian. As such, Rafalca shares the same bloodline with 95% of modern male English Thoroughbred horses.

== Career ==
Rafalca was purchased by Ann Romney, Amy Ebeling, and Beth Meyer in 2006 at the age of 9; imported from Germany to the United States; and started competing with rider Jan Ebeling at the Grand Prix level, the highest competition level in dressage, the same year. The mare was a representative for the United States in the Dressage World Cup Finals in 2009, 2011, and 2012.

In June 2012, Ebeling and Rafalca won a spot on the U.S. Olympics dressage team. At the 2012 Summer Olympics in London, after participating over several days, Ebeling and Rafalca finished in 28th place with a score of 69.302 and did not qualify to move on to the final round for individual medals. They were part of a 6th place overall finish for the U.S. team. Romney said of her horse, "It was wonderful. She was elegant and consistent again. We just love her."

Rafalca was officially retired from competitions in 2014 at the age of 17, and became a broodmare. Ebeling and Rafalca's team of owners - Amy Ebeling, Ann Romney, and Beth Meyer - first tried to breed the mare following her retirement ceremony at the Central Park Horse Show in New York City, New York in 2014; however, Rafalca failed to conceive. In 2015, the owner team made a second attempt to breed Rafalca - now 19 years old - using fresh semen from Connaisseur, a 2007 Dutch Warmblood stallion (Con Amore x Donna Clara, by Donnerhall) and Grand Prix dressage winner. The breeding was successful, and Rafalca became pregnant.

On 30 April 2016, Rafalca gave birth to her first foal, a black or dark bay Oldenburg filly named Rafaela.

In 2017, at age 20, Rafalca was successfully bred again to Gaspard de la Nuit DG (Ravel x Ceolieta, by Sir Donnerhall I, a grandson of Donnerhall), a 2011 Dutch Warmblood stallion. Gaspard's sire, Ravel, had become an international sensation and long-time cornerstone of the U.S. Dressage Team under German rider Steffen Peters and Japanese owner Akiko Yamazaki. In 2018, Rafalca gave birth to her second foal, a bay Oldenburg filly with an unusual white bald face marking named Rafi. Initially purchased by Allida Taylor, a United States Dressage Federation (USDF) gold medalist and CDI Grand Prix competitor, Rafi was resold for $57,000 USD to a private buyer in 2022.

== In popular culture ==
Rafalca is referred to in the show 30 Rock, Saturday Night Live, as well as The Newsroom and Tooning Out the News. Rafalca is referred to in Jenny Rachel Weiner's play "Horse Girls" as part of a song about Ann Romney.

== Pedigree ==
Pedigree of Rafalca
| Sire Argentinus b. 1980 Hanoverian | Argentan I b. 1967; Hanoverian | Absatz b. 1960; Hanoverian | Abglanz b. 1943; Trakehner |
| Sire Argentinus b. 1980 Hanoverian | Argentan I b. 1967; Hanoverian | Absatz b. 1960; Hanoverian | Landmoor b. 1947; Hanoverian |
| Sire Argentinus b. 1980 Hanoverian | Argentan I b. 1967; Hanoverian | Worms b. 1960; Hanoverian | Wohlan b. 1955; Hanoverian |
| Sire Argentinus b. 1980 Hanoverian | Argentan I b. 1967; Hanoverian | Worms b. 1960; Hanoverian | Landschaft b. 1950; Hanoverian |
| Sire Argentinus b. 1980 Hanoverian | Dorle b. 1965; Hanoverian | Duden II b. 1960; Hanoverian | Duellant b. 1943; Hanoverian |
| Sire Argentinus b. 1980 Hanoverian | Dorle b. 1965; Hanoverian | Duden II b. 1960; Hanoverian | Loewenart b. 1954; Hanoverian |
| Sire Argentinus b. 1980 Hanoverian | Dorle b. 1965; Hanoverian | Winterrose b. 1958; Hanoverian | Wirbel II b. 1953; Hanoverian |
| Sire Argentinus b. 1980 Hanoverian | Dorle b. 1965; Hanoverian | Winterrose b. 1958; Hanoverian | Freiheitsglueck b. 1944; Hanoverian |
| Dam Ratine b. 1990 Oldenburg | Rubinstein I b. 1986; Westphalian | Rosenkavalier b. 1980; Westphalian | Romadour II b. 1969; Westphalian |
| Dam Ratine b. 1990 Oldenburg | Rubinstein I b. 1986; Westphalian | Rosenkavalier b. 1980; Westphalian | Diva b. 1973; Westphalian |
| Dam Ratine b. 1990 Oldenburg | Rubinstein I b. 1986; Westphalian | Antine b. 1972; Westphalian | Angelo xx b. 1962; Thoroughbred |
| Dam Ratine b. 1990 Oldenburg | Rubinstein I b. 1986; Westphalian | Antine b. 1972; Westphalian | Dodona b. 1962; Westphalian |
| Dam Ratine b. 1990 Oldenburg | Falconia b. 1981; Oldenburg | Weltmeister b. 1973; Hanoverian | Wedekind b. 1966; Hanoverian |
| Dam Ratine b. 1990 Oldenburg | Falconia b. 1981; Oldenburg | Weltmeister b. 1973; Hanoverian | Domdora b. 1966; Hanoverian |
| Dam Ratine b. 1990 Oldenburg | Falconia b. 1981; Oldenburg | Falaise b. 1975; Oldenburg | Furioso II b. 1965; Selle Français |
| Dam Ratine b. 1990 Oldenburg | Falconia b. 1981; Oldenburg | Falaise b. 1975; Oldenburg | Peggi b. 1964; Westphalian |

== See also ==
- List of historical horses
