= Horse girl =

Horse girl or horsegirl may refer to:

- Horse Girl, a 2020 American psychological drama film directed by Jeff Baena
- Horse Girls, a play by Jenny Rachel Weiner
- Horsegirl, an American rock band from Chicago, Illinois
- HorsegiirL, a German DJ, singer, and songwriter
- Umamusume: Pretty Derby, a Japanese media franchise whose title translates to "Horse Girl Pretty Derby"
