= Jan Ebeling =

German-American equestrian

- Born: September 9, 1958 (age 67); Berlin, Germany
- Occupation: equestrian
- Spouse: Amy Ebeling
- Children: Ben Ebeling

Medal record

Equestrian

Representing the United States

Pan American Games
Gold medal – first place	2003 Santo Domingo	Team dressage

CHIO Aachen
Bronze medal – third place	2013 Aachen	Team dressage

Jan Ebeling (born September 9, 1958) is a German-born American equestrian. After immigrating to the United States in 1984, Ebeling was a well known and prestigious rider in the states until his citizenship in 2002. He competed for the United States in Individual and Team Dressage at the 2012 Summer Olympics on the horse Rafalca.

== Equestrian career ==
In 2003, Ebeling was named to the United States Pan American Team with mount Feleciano, with his direct reserve horse Liberté (owned by longtime sponsor Ann Romney). The team won Gold, and Ebeling finished 5th individually. He began riding his most famous horse, Rafalca, in 2007. With her, Ebeling competed in 3 World Cup Finals, in Las Vegas (2009), Leipzig (2011), and 'S-Hertogenbosch (2012). The highlight of his career thus far was his appearance on the United States Olympic Team in 2012, in London.

In the twilight of her career, Rafalca and Ebeling won Bronze at the Aachen World Equestrian Festival. Ebeling continues to ride at a competitive level, with newer mounts Indeed, Bellena, Zitat, and Status Royal OLD.

=== International Championship Appearances ===
Year	Event	Horse
2003	Pan American Games	Feleciano
2009	World Cup Final- Las Vegas	Rafalca
2011	World Cup Final- Leipzig	Rafalca
2012	World Cup Final- S'Hertogenbosch	Rafalca
2012	Olympic Games- London	Rafalca
2013	CHIO Aachen	Rafalca

== Legal issues ==
=== Horse drugging ===
Jan was part of a lawsuit brought by a woman who had bought a horse, Super Hit from Ann Romney. Jan, as Romney's trainer managed the sale. It was found after the sale that the horse was heavily medicated with Butorphanol, Delomidine, Romifidine, and Xylatine during the pre-purchase examination. The horse was later physically unable to compete in dressage, due to a defect in its foot. The lawsuit claimed the drugs hid the extent of the damage.

In the fraud case between Catherine Norris and Jan and Amy Ebeling, Norris alleged that she was sold a defective horse, Super Hit, managed by Jan Ebeling. She claimed the horse was medicated during the pre-purchase examination to hide a significant defect in its foot, making it unsuitable for dressage competition.

=== Sexual assault lawsuit ===
Jan was accused of negligence in a lawsuit chiefly brought against his son, Ben Ebeling. The suit alleges Ben Ebeling drugged and raped a 14-year-old student of Jan's at his Acres training facility. Jan and his wife Amy Ebeling, who managed the family's The Acres training facility, were named in the suit, accused of negligence and negligent supervision.

As of the 11th of June 2024 filing at the court house continue.
