= Kitty Dukakis =

American author (1936–2025)

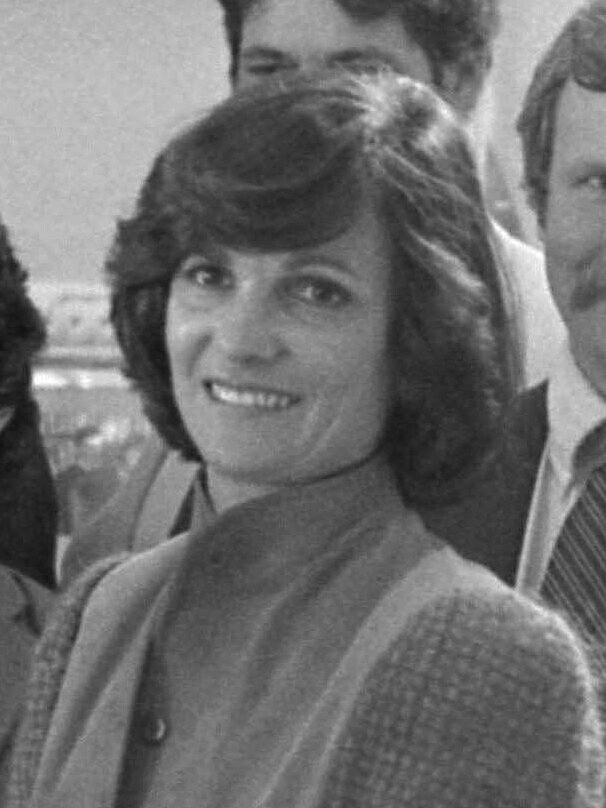
- Dukakis in c. 1985

First Lady of Massachusetts
- In role January 6, 1983 – January 3, 1991
- Governor: Michael Dukakis
- Preceded by: Josephine King
- Succeeded by: Susan Weld
- In role January 2, 1975 – January 4, 1979
- Governor: Michael Dukakis
- Preceded by: Jessie Sargent
- Succeeded by: Josephine King

Personal details
- Born: Katharine Virginia Dickson; December 26, 1936 Cambridge, Massachusetts, U.S.
- Died: March 21, 2025 (aged 88) Brookline, Massachusetts, U.S.
- Spouse(s): John Chaffetz (m. 1957; div. 1961) Michael Dukakis (m. 1963)
- Children: 4, including John
- Education: Pennsylvania State University (attended, no degree); Lesley College (BA); Boston University (MA, MA)

Katharine Virginia "Kitty" Dickson Dukakis (/dʊˈkɑːkɪs/ duu-KAH-kiss; née Dickson; December 26, 1936 – March 21, 2025) was an American author and activist for various social causes. She served as the First Lady of Massachusetts from 1975 to 1979 and 1983 to 1991, as the wife of the Governor of Massachusetts, Michael Dukakis (who was the Democratic Party's nominee for president in 1988).

== Early life and education ==
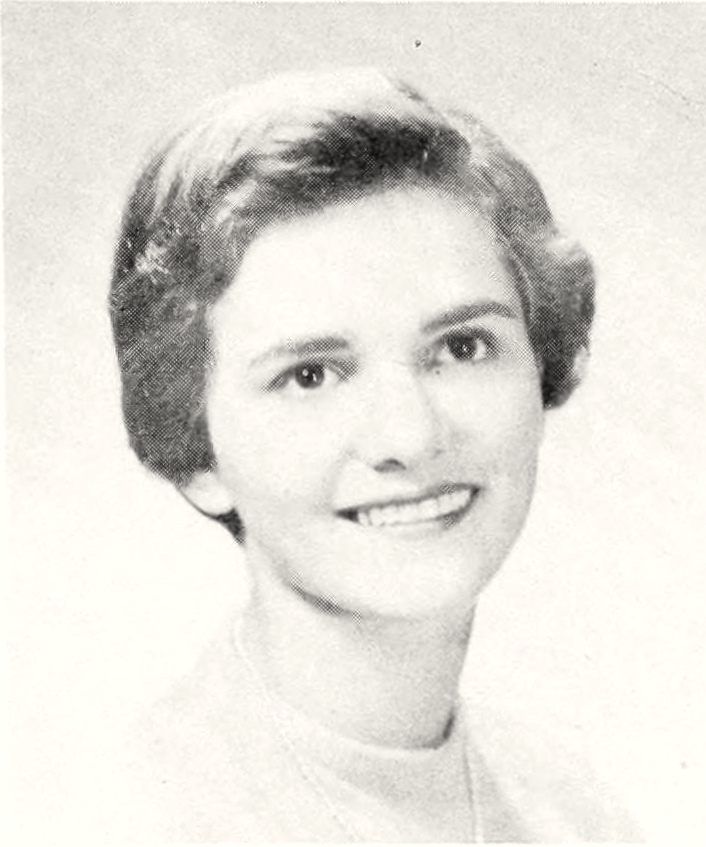
Kitty Dickson, a student at Brookline High School (1954)

Dukakis was born Katharine Virginia Dickson on December 26, 1936, in Cambridge, Massachusetts, the daughter of Jane (née Goldberg) and Harry Ellis Dickson. Her paternal grandparents were Russian Jews. Her mother was born to an Irish Catholic father and a Hungarian Jewish mother, and had been adopted by a family of German Jewish descent. Her father was a member of the first violin section of the Boston Symphony Orchestra for 49 years and also served as Associate Conductor of the Boston Pops orchestra.

She graduated from Brookline High School in 1954 and attended Pennsylvania State University. She dropped out of college in 1956 and married John Chaffetz in 1957. They had one son, John. After four years and several moves, the marriage ended in divorce, and she returned to Cambridge.

She received her B.A. from Lesley College in 1963, the same year she married Michael Dukakis in a civil ceremony. The couple has two daughters. During the 1988 election, Michael Dukakis said that the couple had another child who died shortly after being born. Kitty Dukakis received some criticism for being a Jewish woman who married a Christian man; however, in a 1988 interview, she asserted that marrying outside her faith had strengthened her identification with Judaism. She began attending a synagogue following a trip to Israel in 1976, and by 1988, she was attending Temple Israel, a reform synagogue in Boston. Dukakis and her husband maintained a friendly relationship with her ex-husband (with whom she shared a son) and his family. This included a friendly relationship with Jason Chaffetz, her ex-husband's son from a subsequent marriage who would go on to become a prominent Republican politician.

Dukakis received her Master of Arts degree from Boston University College of Communication in 1982. In 1996, Dukakis graduated from the Boston University School of Social Work with a Master of Arts degree in social work.

== Career ==
Kitty Dukakis was the First Lady of Massachusetts from 1975 to 1979, and from January 1983 until January 1991. She kept an office in the Massachusetts State House, and would frequently visit her husband's office to seek his opinion on projects in which she was involved.

=== 1988 presidential election ===
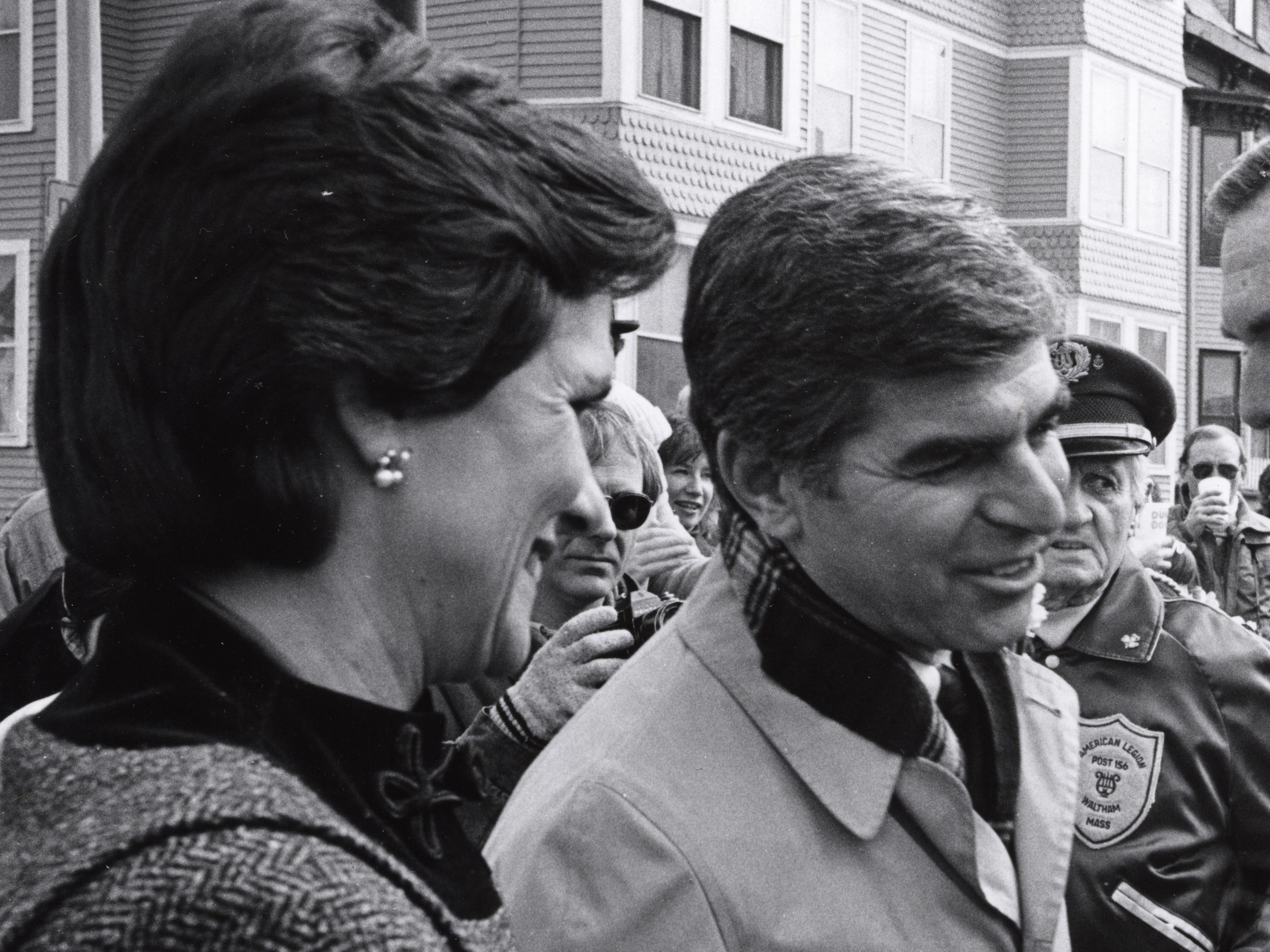
Dukakis and her husband, 1987

Dukakis joined her husband, Michael Dukakis, on the campaign trail during his 1988 presidential campaign, speaking as a "poised and energetic public speaker" at many of his events. The New York Times noted in May 1988 that "[she] does not slip easily into the fixed and adoring stare perfected by generations of political wives. She is a toucher, a talker, a woman who laughs easily and gives orders with equal gusto". She was a speaker at campaign events aimed towards the Jewish community, where she used her "scanty Yiddish". She was the first spouse of a major Presidential candidate who was Jewish.

After Michael was criticized for being too liberal, she "urged [him] to be more aggressive".

Prior to the 1988 presidential election, several false rumors were reported in the media about the Dukakises, including the claim by Idaho Republican Senator Steve Symms that she had burned an American flag to protest the Vietnam War. Republican strategist Lee Atwater was accused of having initiated these rumors.

=== Public service ===
Dukakis was involved in multiple social causes throughout her political career. She was appointed by President Jimmy Carter to the United States Holocaust Memorial Council, serving until 1987, when her term expired. She was reappointed to the council in 1989 by President George H. W. Bush.

Starting during her husband's second term, Dukakis served as co-chair of the Massachusetts Governor's Advisory Committee on the Homeless, where she worked on plans to share shelter costs with charities within the state. Her work "helped to dramatically increase the number of state-funded homeless shelters" in Massachusetts.

Dukakis was also interested in aiding Vietnamese and Cambodian refugees, and served on the board of the Refugee Policy Group. In the early 1980s, she established the Task Force on Cambodian Children. As an advocate for Cambodian refugees, Dukakis visited refugee camps in Thailand and helped bring refugee children to the U.S.

=== Addiction treatment activism ===
Dukakis struggled with depression for much of her life, which drove an addiction to diet pills, and later a struggle with alcoholism. She overcame her addiction to diet pills in 1982, making that fact public when her husband began his presidential bid. While on the campaign trail, she shared her story of addiction with high schoolers.

After Michael Dukakis lost the 1988 presidential election, her depression worsened. In February 1989, she entered an alcohol treatment program. In November 1989, she was briefly hospitalized after drinking rubbing alcohol. In 1991, Dukakis published her memoir, Now You Know, in which she candidly discussed her ongoing battle with alcoholism and the pressures of being a political wife.

Beginning in 2001, Dukakis underwent electroconvulsive therapy (ECT) to treat her depression. She released a book on the subject, Shock: The Healing Power of Electroconvulsive Therapy, in 2006, and became a leading proponent of using ECT to treat depression. She allowed the TV program 60 Minutes to film one of her ECT sessions as part of a program on the subject.

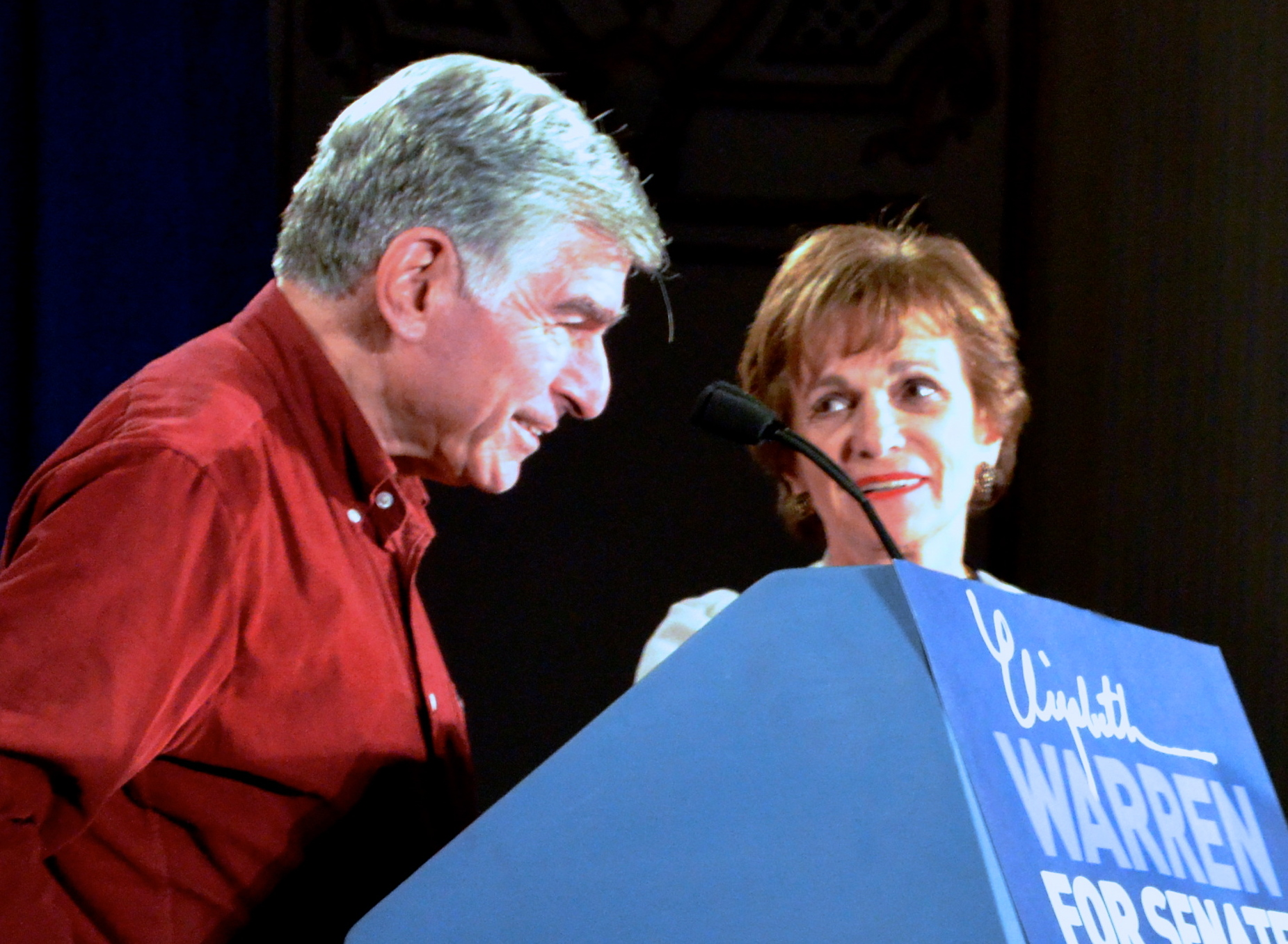
Michael and Kitty Dukakis in 2012

In 2007, the Lemuel Shattuck Hospital in Jamaica Plain, Massachusetts, opened a center for addiction treatment named after Dukakis. In her later years, Dukakis ran a support group in Brookline for those struggling with depression.

=== Later life and death ===
Dukakis appeared in the 2008 documentary on Lee Atwater, Boogie Man: The Lee Atwater Story.

Dukakis died at her home in Brookline, Massachusetts, on March 21, 2025, at the age of 88, of complications from dementia.

== Published works ==
- Now You Know. Simon & Schuster. 1991. ISBN 0-671-74179-9.
- Shock: The Healing Power of Electroconvulsive Therapy. Avery. 2006. ISBN 1-58333-265-0. Cowritten with Larry Tye

Honorary titles
Preceded by Jessie Sargent	First Lady of Massachusetts; 1975–1979	Succeeded by Josephine King
Preceded by Josephine King	First Lady of Massachusetts; 1983–1991	Succeeded by Susan Roosevelt Weld
