= Chuck Hunt =

American dairy farmer (1954–2021)

First Gentleman of Massachusetts
- In office April 10, 2001 – January 2, 2003
- Governor: Jane Swift
- Preceded by: Jan Cellucci (as first lady)
- Succeeded by: Ann Romney (as first lady)

Personal details
- Born: Charles Thomas Hunt III; March 2, 1954 Adams, Massachusetts, U.S.
- Died: December 21, 2021 (aged 67) Williamstown, Massachusetts, U.S.
- Spouse: Jane Swift (m. 1994)
- Children: 4
- Education: California State Polytechnic University, Pomona

Charles Thomas Hunt III (March 2, 1954 – December 21, 2021) was an American dairy farmer, businessman in the construction industry, and physical education teacher. He served as the Acting First Gentleman of Massachusetts from 2001 to 2003 during the tenure of his wife, Acting Governor Jane Swift. He was the first man to hold the position of state First Gentleman, cementing "a place in Massachusetts history", as the Boston Globe later wrote.

== Biography ==
=== Early life ===
Chuck Hunt was born on March 2, 1954, in Adams, Massachusetts, to Charles Hunt, a farmer and heavy equipment construction operator, and Ruth Godfrey Hunt, on a farm they purchased from her family, previously called the Beverly Farm. Hunt was the third of four siblings, who were all sisters. He was born with Alport syndrome, a genetic disorder and kidney disease, which he lived with throughout his life. Hunt was raised on his mother's farm in Williamstown, Massachusetts, which had been in her family for generations, but did not have a stable childhood, according to relatives.

Hunt attended Mount Greylock Regional High School, where he excelled in athletics as captain of both his baseball team, where he was a catcher, and football team, where he played tailback, during his senior year. Hunt was recruited to play semi-professional baseball following his graduation from high school. He then moved to California, where he lived for most of his 20s and 30s. While living in California, Hunt enrolled in California State Polytechnic University, Pomona, where he received a bachelor's degree in physical education and a minor in exercise science. Hunt had three short-lived marriages during this time, all of which ended in divorce. He and his first wife had one son, Brian, who died in 2014.

=== Career ===
Hunt moved back to Massachusetts in 1989 to accept a job offer as a coach at Mount Greylock Regional School. However, the coaching job was soon eliminated due to school budget cuts. About this time, Hunt encountered his future wife, Massachusetts state Senator Jane Swift, whom he noticed while she was holding a campaign sign on the side of a road in Pittsfield. Swift and Hunt met in person for the first time several months later, during a constituents meeting about teacher hirings. Hunt left a business card asking her to a brunch date.

Hunt and Swift married in 1994. The couple had three children - Elizabeth and twins daughters, Lauren and Sarah.

Four years later, Jane Swift was elected Lieutenant Governor of Massachusetts as the running mate of Governor Paul Cellucci. In 2001, Jane Swift became Governor of Massachusetts following Cellucci's appointment as Ambassador to Canada.

Swift's political ascendence thrust Hunt, a largely private individual, in the public spotlight. Chuck Hunt became the state's first ever First Gentleman, earning him "a place in Massachusetts history", as the Boston Globe noted. In addition to his role as first gentleman, Hunt became a stay-at-home father for their three children during his wife's tenure, which was still unusual for men at the time. Hunt also left his construction business during this to focus on his personal and public obligations. He kept his children on his family farm during that time, saying in a 2001 interview, "If I can be home on the farm and raise children, I'll be happy."

In 2018, Hunt underwent a kidney transplant, but he experienced organ rejection in 2020. Chuck Hunt died from kidney disease, a complication of Alport syndrome, at his home in Williamstown, Massachusetts, on December 21, 2021, at the age of 67. He was survived by his wife, former Governor Jane Swift, and their three daughters.

== See also ==
- List of first gentlemen in the United States

Honorary titles
Preceded by Jan Cellucci	First Gentleman of Massachusetts; 2001-2003	Succeeded by Ann Romney
