= Tagg Romney =

American businessman (born 1970)

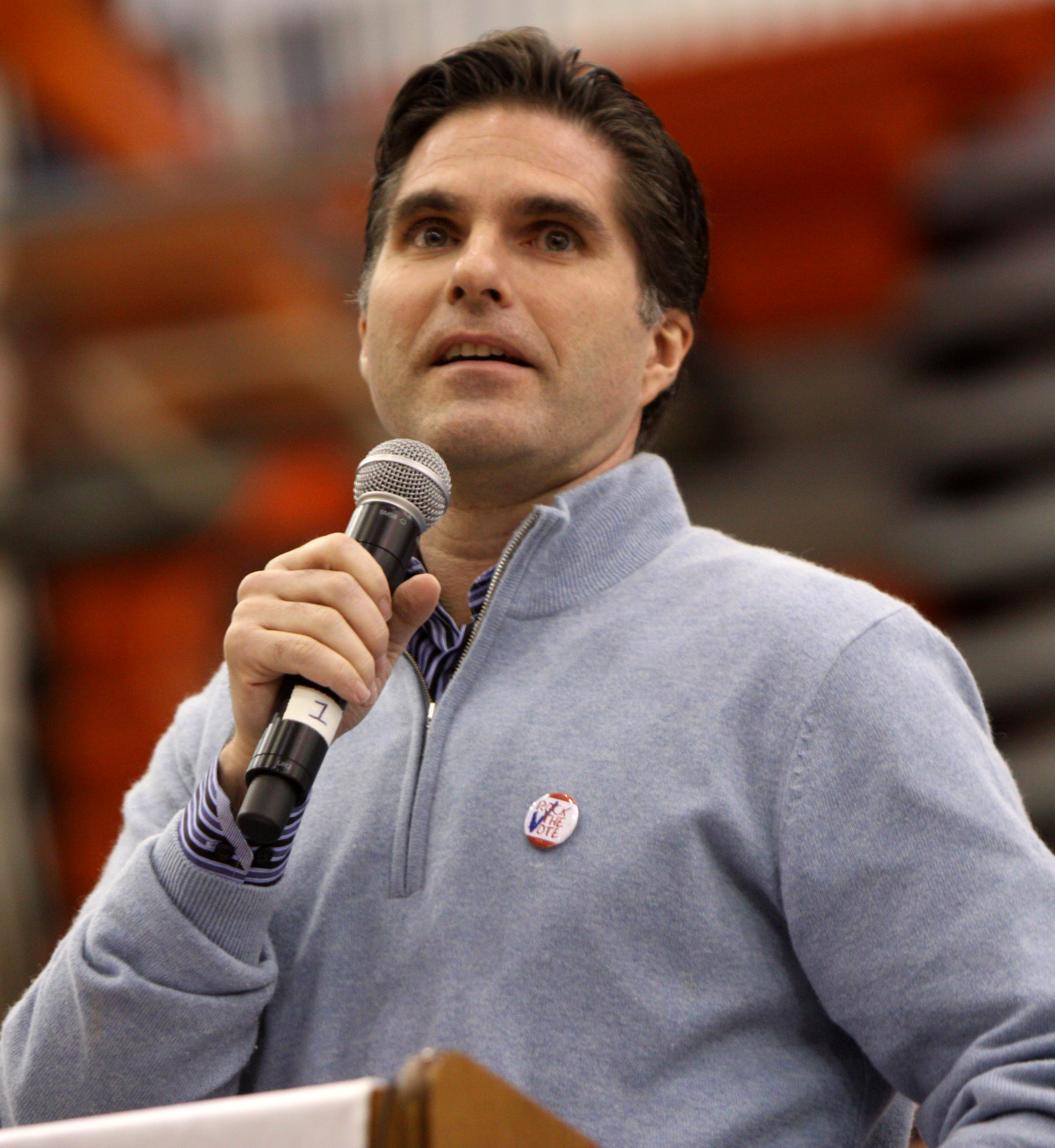
- Romney in January 2012
- Born: Taggart Mitt Romney; March 21, 1970 (age 56); Provo, Utah, U.S.
- Education: Brigham Young University (BA); Harvard University (MBA)
- Occupations: Management consultant; Venture capitalist
- Political party: Republican
- Spouse: Jennifer Romney
- Children: 6
- Parents: Mitt Romney (father); Ann Romney (mother)
- Family: Romney

Taggart Mitt Romney (born March 21, 1970) is an American management consultant, businessman, venture capitalist and political advisor. He is the eldest son of businessman and former U.S. Senator Mitt Romney.

== Early life and education ==
Taggart Romney is the oldest son of Ann and Mitt Romney, born when both were undergraduates at Brigham Young University (BYU) in Tagg's birthplace of Provo, Utah. He attended Belmont Hill School, a preparatory academy before he graduated magna cum laude with a B.A. in economics from BYU and earned an M.B.A. from the Harvard Business School.

== Career ==
Romney has worked as the head of marketing for the Los Angeles Dodgers, VP of on-field marketing at Reebok, and director of strategic planning at Elan Pharmaceuticals. Romney founded and subsequently sold Season Perks, a software design company. He also worked for several years as a consultant at both Monitor Group and McKinsey and Co. Romney has been a partner in the private equity firm Solamere Capital, together with family friend Spencer Zwick, and Eric Scheuermann, previously a partner in New York-based Jupiter Partners. Zwick was also the finance chair of the 2012 campaign. Romney worked as a senior aide on his father's presidential campaign in 2008 and during his Massachusetts gubernatorial campaign in 2002. He participated as an advisor in his father's 2012 presidential campaign, and he attracted the attention of the media just before the November election.

In June 2014, Solamere sponsored the third annual "Romney Retreat" at the Stein Eriksen Lodge in Park City, Utah. Most potential 2016 Republican Party Presidential candidates, Peyton Manning, firm clients, former Secretary of State George P. Shultz, and Mia Love, among others, along with Mitt Romney, spoke or were in attendance at the three-day event. Other scheduled attendees included business executives Meg Whitman and Harold Hamm.

He was the subject of speculation in February 2013 that he would run for the United States Senate from Massachusetts in the 2014 election. He declined to do so, saying that "the timing is not right for me."

=== 2012 presidential election ===
After the second presidential debate, a North Carolina radio station interviewed Romney and asked him what it was like "to hear the president of the United States call your dad a liar." Romney laughed and replied: "Jump out of your seat, and you want to rush down to the stage and take a swing at him. But you know you can't do that because, well, first because there's a lot of Secret Service between you and him, but also because that's the nature of the process. "They're going to do everything they can to paint my dad as someone he's not. We knew what we were getting into, so now we just have to take the hits, stay strong, and be ready to fight back." A campaign aide told ABC News that the remarks about taking a swing at the president were all in jest.

HIG Capital, an investment partner of Romney's company, Solamere, supplied voting machines in the state of Ohio, which caused concern before the November elections. A spokesperson for Solamere later commented on the matter, saying, "Not only does Solamere have no direct or indirect interest in this company Hart InterCivic, Solamere and its partners have no ownership in this company, nor do they have any ownership in nor have made any investments in the fund that invested in the voting machine company."

In 2012, National Journal named Romney one of ten Republicans to follow on Twitter. Romney stated in 2012 that he was uninterested in pursuing a political career in his own right.

=== Post-2012 election ===
In 2015, Romney stated he was both "sad and relieved" at his father's decision not to run in the 2016 Republican Party presidential primary.

== Personal life ==
Romney and his wife, Jennifer, have six children, three via surrogate mothers. The family resides in Belmont, Massachusetts.
