= Edward Roderick Davies =

American businessman

Mayor of Bloomfield Hills, Michigan
- In office Late 1940s – 1960s

Personal details
- Born: June 2, 1915 Caerau, Bridgend, Wales
- Died: September 8, 1992 (aged 77) Stuart, Florida, U.S.
- Spouse: Lois Pottinger
- Children: 3, including Ann Romney
- Education: General Motors Institute of Technology
- Positions: Co-founder, Jered Industries, 1946

Edward Roderick Davies (June 2, 1915 – September 8, 1992) was an American industrialist and politician who served as mayor of Bloomfield Hills, Michigan. He was the father of Ann Romney, wife of Senator Mitt Romney and was a life-long Atheist.

== Life and career ==
Davies was born on June 2, 1915, in Caerau, Bridgend, Wales, into a Welsh coal mining family. In 1929 he emigrated to the United States with his father David Davies who had black lung disease and had been injured in a mining accident. David worked at a Ford plant and paid for his wife, Annie Davies, and son, Edward, to come thereafter. In 1938, Edward graduated from General Motors Institute of Technology with a degree in engineering and, after serving a stint in the U.S. Naval Engineering corps, in 1946 he co-founded a maker of heavy equipment for marine use, Jered Industries. Some sources have suggested that Jered helped to engineer the landing craft used for the D-Day invasion of Normandy, though this is unlikely as Jered was not founded until well after D-Day. Davies—who had also worked with the NASA's Gemini space program and served as the mayor of Bloomfield Hills, Michigan—was the father of Ann Romney, wife of former Massachusetts governor and 2012 presidential nominee Mitt Romney.

He died on September 8, 1992. Due to a successful business career and wise investments, Davies had amassed an estate worth millions of dollars. At the time of his death, Davies owned large properties and a 65-foot yacht.

== Jered ==
Jered was sold to the British engineering firm Vickers in 1980, at Davies' retirement. (The division became an independent entity again in 1997 and was acquired in 2005 by PaR Systems.)

== Religious views ==
Davies rejected religion and was an avowed atheist. Before Davies married Lois, he insisted she give up organized religion and later his son Roderick Davies said, "Dad considered people who were religious to be weak in the knees." By the time of his death, he was the only member of Ann Romney's immediate family to have not converted to the Church of Jesus Christ of Latter-day Saints. In spite of his atheism and anti-religious views, on the 19th of November, 1993 in a special family meeting, just fourteen months after he died, he was baptized by proxy and had his endowment performed for him. On the 10th of June, 1994 Davies, in another LDS Mormon temple ceremony, was sealed for eternity to his wife Lois in the Atlanta, Georgia temple. According to the doctrines and beliefs of the Church of Jesus Christ of Latter-day Saints, deceased individuals are allowed to accept or reject ordinances performed vicariously by close family members on their behalf.
