= Horse Girls =

Play by Jenny Rachel Weiner

- Original language: English
- Written by: Jenny Rachel Weiner
- Genre: Black comedy

Premiere
- Date: August, 2013
- Place: Chicago

Horse Girls is a one-act play written by Jenny Rachel Weiner in 2013. The play follows a group of pre-teens holding a meeting for their horse appreciation club, dubbed "The Lady Jean Ladies". The play becomes progressivley more and more absurd throughout the runtime as the members of the club are informed that the stable keeping their horses will soon be shut down and all of their horses will be slaughtered.

== Characters ==
=== Lady Jean Ladies Officers ===
- Ashleigh Whitford - President of the Lady Jean Ladies. The main character of the play, deeply insecure and compensates by having a "Mean Girl" personality.
- Tiffany Gesuvia - Vice President of the Lady Jean Ladies. Older sister of Robin. Has been best friends with Ashleigh since infancy and is extremely jealous of her.
- Robin Gesuvia - Secretary of the Lady Jean Ladies. The little sister of Tiffany, the youngest of the group, and a desperate people-pleaser.
- Margaret Flanaghan - Treasurer of the Lady Jean Ladies. Has diabetes and is a suspected lesbian.
- Brandi Marshall - Historian of the Lady Jean Ladies. Is not talented in horse riding but loves them regardless.

=== Lady Jean Ladies Member(s) & Guest ===
- Camille Lowenstein - The only Lady Jean Ladies member without a designated role. Looks like a popular girl.
- Trish Lowenstein - Camille's cousin who is visiting from Manhattan.

== Plot ==
The story opens inside of the pristinely white bedroom of 12 year old Ashleigh Whitford directly before a meeting of the Orlando-based horse appreciation club named "The Lady Jean Ladies." Most members of the club are assembled there, except for Brandi and Camille. Camille then enters with her cousin who is visiting from Manhattan, Trish. Trish is introduced to all members of the club, and the meeting is started without Brandi. However, halfway through the meeting, Brandi bursts through the door and announces to the group that the stable keeping their horses is being sold and all of the horses will be slaughtered for their meat.

This news creates complete pandemonium among the girls. They attempt to call Ann Romney, who they view as the ultimate horse girl, to no avail. Ashleigh sends all of the other girls out of the room so she can propose to Tiffany that they run away together with their horses. Tiffany doesn't want to go alone, so Ashleigh allows the other girls to come, to which Tiffany tepidly accepts. When the girls come back up to Ashleigh's room it has been decided by vote that the group does not want to run away.

Faced with the rejection of her peers, and thinking that Tiffany is attempting to take over he club, Ashleigh recklessley flings the horse trophy in the direction of Camille, causing her cousin Trish to defend her by getting into a physical fight with Ashleigh where she is hit in the head by the trophy and killed on impact. Brandi confronts Ashleigh, telling her she is a bully, and is then stabbed in the chest. Tiffany leads the other girls outside and as she is talking to Ashleigh is choked to death by Margaret, who wants to run away with Ashleigh. Margaret then kisses Asleigh, but is told to go outside and escape with the others. Left alone in her room, Ashleigh turns on a karoke machine and sings a cover of Mariah Carey's "Forever" as the stage lights drop.

== Notable productions ==
Professional & College productions
Theatre	Year	Director
The Cell	2015	Sarah Krohn
Annex Theatre	2014	Norah Elges
Fordham/Primary Stages	2013	Sarah Krohn
Ars Nova's ANT FEST	2013	Sarah Krohn
Collaboraction Theatre Company	2013	Rebecca Stevens

== Reception ==
Claudia La Rocco of The New York Times, in her mixed review of Manhattan's Cell Theatre production, direct by Sarah Krohn, described the play as "A 50-minute pop descent into madness". But then later goes on to conclude the article by criticizing the play, stating "It feels more like a young-adult novel in its complexity, or lack thereof."

Elsa Beach of The Oberlin Review, in her review of the Oberlin Student Theatre's production of Horse Girls, praises the play for "[Making] the most of its short run-time to show the complex dynamics of tween friendship." and also goes on to praise the actors portrayal of teen awkwardness and the "unsettling and hilarious" choreography.
