= Collaboraction Theatre Company =

Theater in Chicago

- Address: Chicago, Illinois; United States
- Type: Non-profit

Construction
- Opened: 1996

Website
- collaboraction.org

Collaboraction Theatre Company is a social justice theatre company in Chicago.

== History ==
Founded in 1996 by Kimberly Senior, Sandra Delgado, John Cabrera, and others, Collaboraction has been led by Artistic Director Anthony Moseley since 1999. Collaboraction uses performance for dialogue on social issues. Collaboraction is the resident theatre company of Kennedy-King College in the Englewood neighborhood on the south side of Chicago.

=== Awards ===
- Foster Innovation Award from the City of Chicago's Department of Cultural Affairs and Special Events - 2020
- Multi-Racial Unity Award from the Racial Justice Taskforce of the First Unitarian Church of Chicago - 2020
- Otto Award from the Castillo Theatre - 2018
- Stand for the Arts Award from Comcast and Ovation TV - 2018

==== Productions ====
- The annual Sketchbook Festival
- The annual Peacebook Festival

Collaboraction created a mental health PSA campaign during the COVID-19 pandemic to aid theatre workers. The campaign was a collaborative effort between Collaboraction, NAMI Chicago, Season of Concern, and the League of Chicago Theatres.
