= Ann Romney =

American author and philanthropist (born 1949)

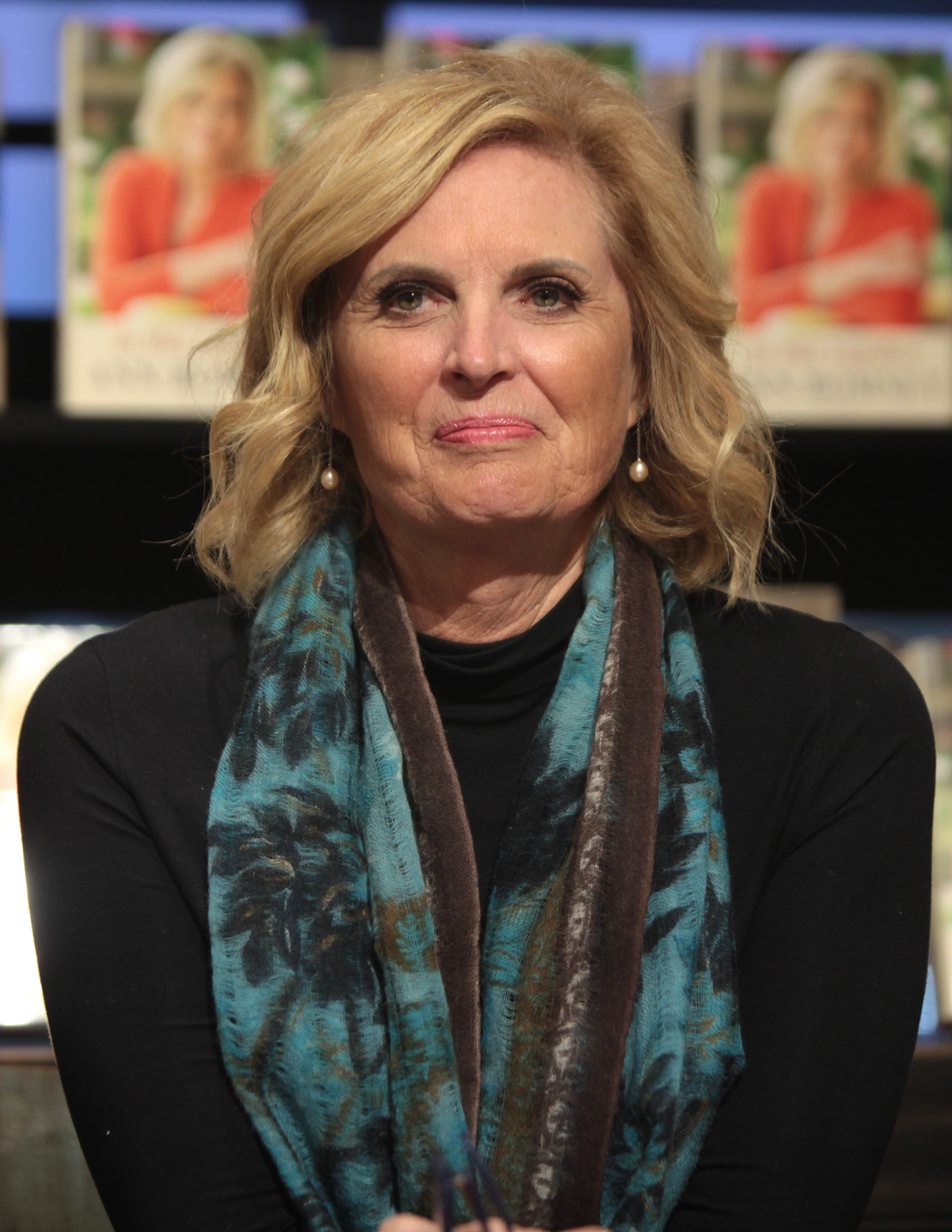
- Romney in 2015

First Lady of Massachusetts
- In role January 3, 2003 – January 4, 2007
- Governor: Mitt Romney
- Preceded by: Chuck Hunt (as First Gentleman)
- Succeeded by: Diane Patrick

Personal details
- Born: Ann Lois Davies; April 16, 1949 (age 77) Detroit, Michigan, U.S.
- Party: Republican
- Spouse: Mitt Romney (m. 1969)
- Children: 5, including Tagg
- Parent: Edward Roderick Davies (father)
- Relatives: Romney family (by marriage)
- Education: Brigham Young University (BA)

Ann Lois Romney (née Davies; born April 16, 1949) is an American author and philanthropist. She is married to politician and businessman Mitt Romney and was First Lady of Massachusetts during her husband's tenure as governor of that state.

Davies was born in Detroit and raised in Bloomfield Hills, Michigan, where she attended the private Kingswood School. After converting to the Church of Jesus Christ of Latter-day Saints (LDS Church) in 1966, Davies attended Brigham Young University (BYU). She married Mitt Romney in 1969 and received a Bachelor of Arts degree in French in 1975.

As First Lady of Massachusetts, Romney served as the governor's liaison for federal faith-based initiatives. She was involved in a number of children's charities, including Operation Kids. Later, she was an active participant in her husband's U.S. presidential campaigns in 2008 and in 2012.

Romney was diagnosed with multiple sclerosis in 1998. She has credited a mixture of mainstream and alternative treatments with giving her a lifestyle mostly without limitations, and has said that equestrianism has helped her maintain her health. Romney has received recognition in dressage as an adult amateur at the national level and has competed professionally in Grand Prix as well. In 2014, she opened the Ann Romney Center for Neurological Diseases at Brigham and Women's Hospital in Boston; the Center performs intersectional research regarding multiple sclerosis and several other brain diseases.

== Early life ==
Born Ann Lois Davies in Detroit on April 16, 1949, she was raised in Bloomfield Hills, Michigan, by parents Edward Roderick Davies and Lois (Pottinger) Davies. She has two brothers. Her father, originally from Caerau near Maesteg, Wales, was a self-made businessman who in 1946 co-founded Jered Industries, a maker of heavy machinery for marine use located in Troy, Michigan. He had also held the part-time position of Mayor of Bloomfield Hills. Raised in the Welsh Congregationalists, he had become strongly opposed to all organized religion, although on her request the family very occasionally attended church, and she nominally identified as an Episcopalian. At times, she helped out at her father's plant.

Ann Davies knew of Mitt Romney since elementary school. She went to the private Kingswood School in Bloomfield Hills, which was the sister school to the all-boys Cranbrook School that he attended. The two were re-introduced and began dating in March 1965; they informally agreed to marriage after his senior prom in June 1965. He talked of the marriage taking place in the near future, but she insisted that he go on Mormon missionary duty on the grounds that he would regret it later if he did not.

Mitt attended Stanford University for a year and then was away starting a 2 1/2-year missionary stint in France. During 1966, she converted to the Church of Jesus Christ of Latter-day Saints, without him having made any request to her that she do so. In the conversion process she accepted the guidance of Mitt's father George Romney, the Governor of Michigan. George included her in Romney family events while Mitt was away; she appreciated his treating her as an equal and picked him to baptize her.

Ann graduated from high school in 1967 and began attending Brigham Young University (BYU). She spent the second semester of her freshman year abroad, at the University of Grenoble in France, and was there during the 1968 Winter Olympics and met athletes such as skiing star Jean-Claude Killy. The Mormon missionary rules allowed her only two brief visits with Mitt and very rare telephone calls with him. Back at BYU, she involved herself in campus life, spending several days a week as a volunteer in the academic affairs office. While at BYU, she dated future business academic Kim S. Cameron. She sent Mitt a letter mentioning being courted by another student who she said reminded her of Mitt; this alarmed Mitt as missionaries often received "Dear John" letters from girlfriends while away. Mitt sent letters back imploring her to wait for him.

== Marriage and children ==
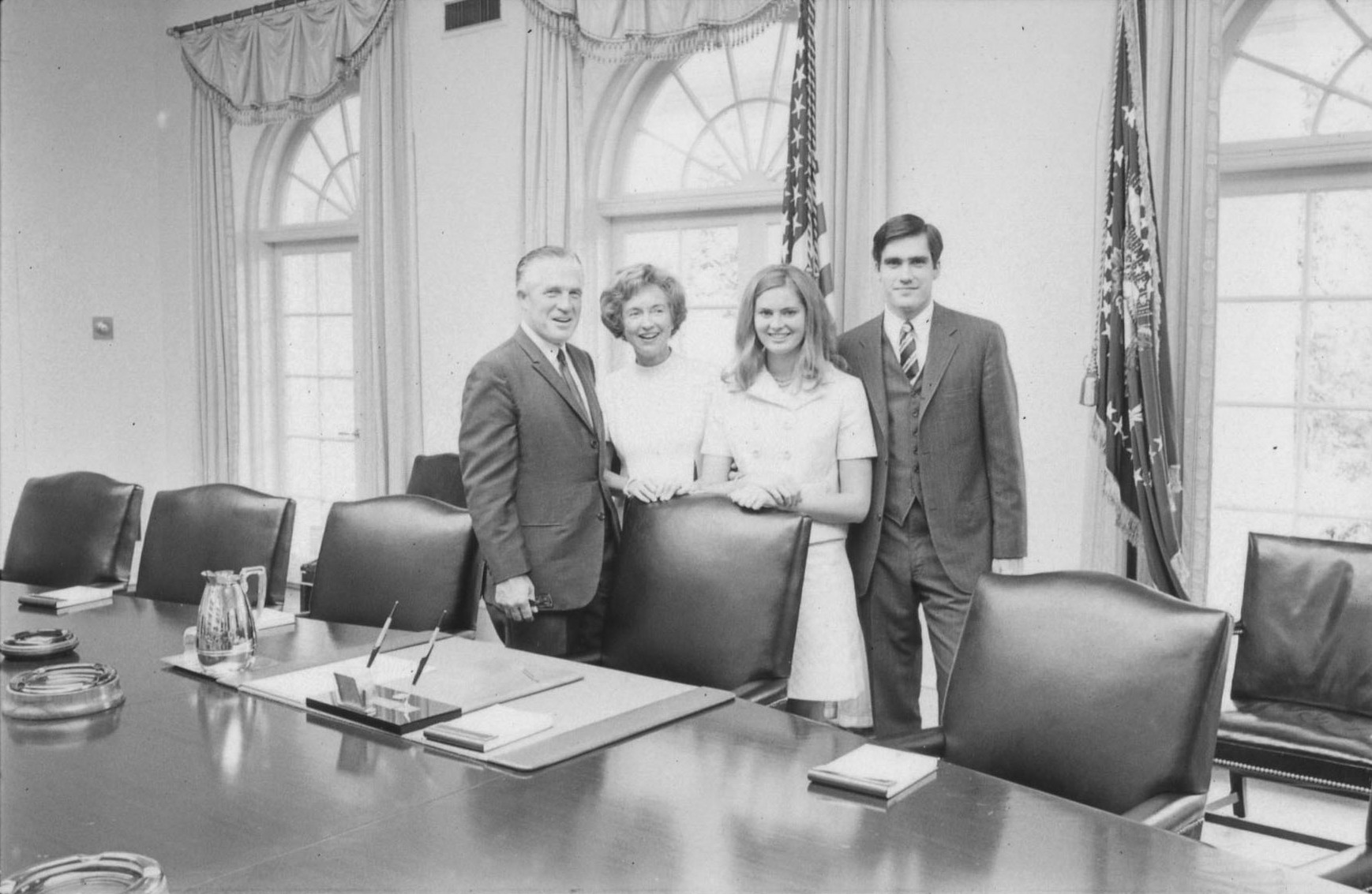
Ann and Mitt Romney in the Cabinet Room at the White House in July 1969, along with his parents Lenore and George Romney, the latter of whom was Secretary of Housing and Urban Development

Immediately after Romney's return from France in December 1968, the pair reconnected and agreed to get married as soon as possible. Ann Davies and Mitt Romney were married in a civil ceremony on March 21, 1969, at her Bloomfield Hills home, with a reception afterward at the Bloomfield Hills Country Club. It was presided over by Edwin B. Jones, a banker and Romney family friend then serving as an LDS Church Regional representative of the Twelve. Among the 250–300 guests were U.S. House Minority Leader Gerald Ford and automotive executives such as Semon Knudsen and Edward Cole, and President Richard Nixon sent congratulations. The following day the couple flew to Utah for a wedding ceremony inside the Salt Lake Temple; her parents could not attend since they were non-Mormons, but were present at a subsequent wedding breakfast held for them across the street. (Both her brothers converted to Mormonism within a year of her doing so; her mother converted much later.)

The couple's first son, Tagg Romney, was born in 1970 while both were undergraduates at BYU (Mitt had transferred from Stanford to BYU at Ann's request). After Mitt graduated, the couple moved to Belmont, Massachusetts, so that he could attend Harvard Business School and Harvard Law School. Slowed down by parenthood, she later finished her undergraduate work by gaining a semester and half's worth of credits via taking night courses at Harvard University Extension School. Ann Romney received a Bachelor of Arts degree with a concentration in French language from BYU in 1975.

A stay-at-home mother, Romney raised the family's five sons: Taggart (known as "Tagg", born in 1970), Matthew ("Matt", 1971), Joshua ("Josh", 1975), Benjamin ("Ben", 1978), and Craig (1981). She faced criticism from her parents over her decision to marry and start a large family so young. She also felt snubbed by her peers, at a time when the feminist movement was blooming and educated women were establishing careers. She later said, "My parents were questioning my choices, my peers were. But [...] I was pretty resolute, pretty confident in what I was doing." She taught early morning seminary to them and other children while her husband worked, first in business, then in politics. She wanted to go on for a master's degree, perhaps in art history, but first taking care of her children, and later her health issues, forestalled that. She was active in the local PTA and with the League of Women Voters. With a friend, she held local cooking classes for a brief period. Naturally athletic, she began playing tennis and became one of the best players around the local country clubs.

== Early involvement in politics ==
Ann Romney ran for the position of town meeting representative in Belmont in 1977. She studied local issues and engaged in door-to-door campaigning, and won the election.

It was partly due to her urging that her husband entered politics and ran in the 1994 U.S. Senate election in Massachusetts against incumbent Democrat Ted Kennedy. The race constituted her first prolonged public exposure as she campaigned for him on a nightly basis. She was seen as superficial and too deferential to him and some columnists labelled her a "Stepford wife". Late in that campaign, she gave a long interview to The Boston Globe. Her statement in it that she and her husband had never had a serious argument during their married years came in for ridicule, and her portrayal of the couple's student years as financially impoverished, while they lived off of sales of George Romney's stock and loans, made her seem privileged and naïve and brought a harsh public reaction. Boston University political science professor later said, "She definitely hurt him in that race." Asked following her husband's loss if she would be involved in future campaigns, Ann said, "Never. You couldn't pay me to do this again." She later termed the experience "a real education".

== Multiple sclerosis ==
In 1997, Ann Romney began experiencing severe numbness, fatigue, and other symptoms, and in November 1998, just before Thanksgiving, she was diagnosed with multiple sclerosis. Mitt Romney described watching her fail a series of neurological tests as the worst day of his life. He later said: "I couldn't operate without Ann. We're a partnership. We've always been a partnership so her being healthy and our being able to be together is essential." She initially experienced a period of severe difficulty with the disease, and later said: "I was very sick in 1998 when I was diagnosed. I was pretty desperate, pretty frightened and very, very sick. It was tough at the beginning, just to think, this is how I'm going to feel for the rest of my life."

Since then, she credits a mixture of mainstream and alternative treatments with giving her a lifestyle mostly without limitations. She initially used corticosteroids, including intravenously, and credited them with helping stop the progression of the disease. She then dropped them and other medications due to counterproductive side effects. She has partaken of reflexology, acupuncture, and craniosacral therapy, and has said, "There is huge merit in both Eastern and Western medicine, and I've taken a little bit from both." She is a board member for the New England chapter of the National Multiple Sclerosis Society.

== Equestrianism ==
Romney is an avid equestrian, crediting her renewed involvement in it while in Park City, Utah (where the couple had built a vacation home and where they lived when he was in charge of the 2002 Winter Olympic Games), for much of her recovery after her multiple sclerosis diagnosis and for her continued ability to deal with the disease. She has said that riding "saved my life", explaining that, "I was losing most of the function of my right side. And I decided I needed to go back and do what I loved before I couldn't do it anymore." At first she could barely stay on a horse without getting tired, but gradually the muscle control required for riding proved directly beneficial, and psychologically, "Riding exhilarated me; it gave me a joy and a purpose. When I was so fatigued that I couldn't move, the excitement of going to the barn and getting my foot in the stirrup would make me crawl out of bed." As a result, she said, "My desire to ride was, and is, so strong that I kept getting healthier and healthier."

She has received recognition in dressage as an adult amateur at the national level, including earning her 2006 Gold Medal and 2005 Silver Medal at the Grand Prix level from the United States Dressage Federation. She also sometimes competes in professional dressage events and has broken the 60% level at Grand Prix. Romney works with California trainer Jan Ebeling, who schools her and her horses in dressage and works with her importing new stock from Europe. The pair qualified for the Pan-Am games in 2004.

By 2011, the horses she owned and kept at Ebeling's Moorpark, California, stables, which she is a partner in, were valued at more than $250,000. The Romneys helped fund Ebeling's aspirations for equestrian competition at the 2012 Summer Olympics, and Ann was present in Gladstone, New Jersey, in June 2012 when Ebeling, riding on the horse Rafalca (co-owned by him and Ann) won a spot on the U.S. dressage team. At the London games in August 2012, she watched the pair place 28th in the competition.

== Charitable work ==
Ann Romney has been involved in a number of children's charities, including having been a director of the inner city-oriented Best Friends, which seeks to assist inner-city adolescent girls. She advocated a celibacy-based approach to the prevention of teen pregnancy. She worked extensively with the Ten Point Coalition in Boston and with other groups that promoted better safety and opportunities for urban youths.

She was an honorary board member of Families First, a parent education program in Cambridge, Massachusetts. She was a volunteer instructor of middle-school girls at the multicultural Mother Caroline Academy in Boston.

She has said her interest in helping underprivileged children dates back to when she and her five boys saw a vehicle carrying a group of boys to a Massachusetts Department of Youth Services detention center. She began volunteering for the United Way of Massachusetts Bay soon after that, and by 2002 was serving as one of that organization's board members. She was on the Faith in Action Committee for the United Way, working with local religious establishments to assist at-risk children and helping to found United Way Faith and Action. Earlier, by 1996, she was a member of the Massachusetts Advisory Board of Stand for Children.

During the 2002 Winter Olympics effort, she co-chaired the Olympic Aid charity, which provides athletic activities and programs for children in war-torn regions.

== First Lady of Massachusetts ==
Romney joined in her husband's campaign in the 2002 Massachusetts gubernatorial election from the start, and nominated him at the state party convention. A commercial entitled "Mitt and Ann", highlighting their romance and marriage, began the campaign's television advertising. She avoided media interviews like the one that plagued her in 1994, but was a force behind the scenes during the eventually successful campaign.

In January 2003, following his election, Romney became First Lady of Massachusetts, a position she held through January 2007. In that role, she generally kept a low public profile, with by her husband's initial indications no public role in administration or its policies. In 2006, The Boston Globe characterized her as "largely invisible" within the state (although by then she was becoming more visible outside the state, due to national appearances in connection with her husband's possible presidential campaign). Romney was president of the Doric Docents, the volunteer tour directors who inform visitors to the State House about its architecture and history and the Massachusetts legislative process.

While Massachusetts First Lady, she was active in teenage pregnancy prevention efforts. In 2004, she said she was in favor of stem cell research as long as it was done "morally and ethically". One of her rare public appearances at the Massachusetts State House came in 2004 when she lobbied the legislature to raise awareness about multiple sclerosis.

In 2005, the governor appointed his wife as head of a new special office whose purpose was to help the state's faith-based groups gain more federal monies in association with the White House Office of Faith-Based and Community Initiatives. This came after the state had seen its share of faith-based grants decline over the preceding three years. In this unpaid Governor's Liaison position, Ann Romney was termed a "dynamo" by Jim Towey, director of the White House office.

At the conclusion of her time as Massachusetts First Lady, Romney said that the role "doesn't need to change your life at all. I think it's an opportunity for service and an opportunity to see people of all walks of life from across the Commonwealth...It's an enriching part of your life [and one will] treasure it forever." Her health was still a primary factor in family decisions about her husband's career, and Mitt said in 2005 that if her multiple sclerosis flared up, "I wouldn't be involved in politics anymore; that would be over."

== Role in 2008 presidential campaign ==
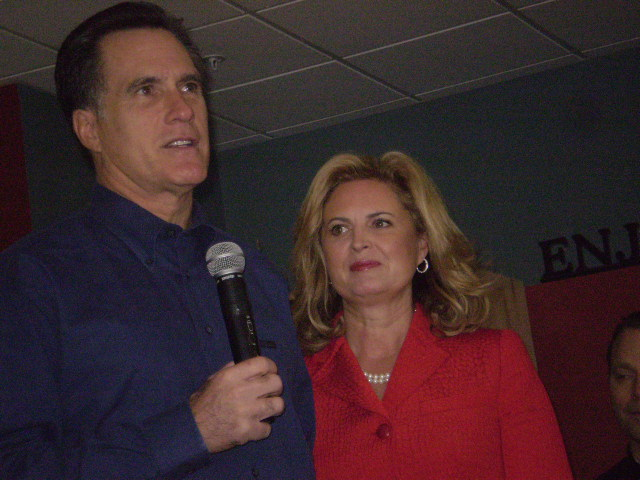
Ann Romney with her husband, at a campaign stop in Altoona, Iowa, on December 29, 2007

Ann Romney was an active participant in her husband's 2008 presidential campaign. One past issue that arose involving her was disclosure of her donation of $150 to Planned Parenthood in 1994, when her husband was a pro-choice candidate for the U.S. Senate. She said she did not remember the contribution; her own public stance on abortion has evolved in a similar manner to his, and by this time she was co-chair of the capital campaign for Massachusetts Citizens for Life. By late 2007, she had become an integral part of his campaign, and was doing more trips and appearances on her own, despite the risk that added stress would aggravate her condition.

Her political message was often mixed with discussions of her family, her recipes, or managing her condition. Romney's television advertisements in the early primary states prominently featured her and by the close of 2007, she was the most visible of all the Republican candidates' wives in campaigning. Regarding having to witness criticism of her husband, she later acknowledged that she sometimes wanted to "come out of my seat and clock somebody [but] you learn to just take a deep breath." By the time he ended his campaign in February 2008, she had become openly distasteful of the whole process.

== Between campaigns ==
In December 2008, Romney was diagnosed with mammary ductal carcinoma in situ, a non-invasive type of breast cancer, and had the lump removed via lumpectomy; she subsequently underwent radiation therapy. Her prognosis from this condition was excellent, and she later reflected that "I was really lucky" to have caught it so early. President-elect Barack Obama was among the well-wishers who called her. She has been cancer-free since.

In June 2009, due to her husband's request, Ann Romney became the first spouse to be included in the official Massachusetts State House gubernatorial portrait.

For many years the couple's primary residence was a house in Belmont, Massachusetts, but this and the Utah home were sold in 2009. They resided in Wolfeboro, New Hampshire, along Lake Winnipesaukee, and at an oceanfront home in La Jolla, San Diego, California, that they had bought the year before. Both locations were near some of the Romneys' grandchildren and the La Jolla location was near where she rides horses and was well-situated for her multiple sclerosis therapies and for recovering from her cancer treatments. They also bought a smaller condominium in Belmont during 2010.

== Role in 2012 presidential campaign ==
Regarding another possible run for office by her husband in the 2012 presidential election, Romney said in March 2010 that this time the process would hold no surprises, and that if he decided in favor of doing it, "I'm up to saying, go storm the castle, sweetie." Although still not liking the political process, which she referred to as "a very difficult game", she urged her husband to run again and was one of the few family members to initially support the notion.

Once the campaign began, she stumped for her husband in early primary states and criticized the record and ideological direction of the Obama administration. As part of trying to lighten her husband's image, she sometimes participated in comic setup routines with him. Romney said that if she became First Lady of the United States, she would seek to work with at-risk youths and on behalf of those with multiple sclerosis. She expressed admiration for three former first ladies, Mamie Eisenhower, Nancy Reagan, and Barbara Bush.

By December 2011, Romney assumed an even more prominent role in the campaign, as she tried to offer a more rounded and compelling portrait of her husband while he fell behind Newt Gingrich for a stretch in polls. Her emphasis on their 42 years of marriage and his steadfastness following the onset of her disease offered an implicit but clear contrast with Gingrich's own personal history. She had long been known within the family as the "Mitt-stabilizer", due to the calming effect she had on her husband, and continued to perform that role during the up-and-down campaign. In particular, she began appearing with him more often during February 2012 as he dueled with Rick Santorum during the Republican presidential primaries. Regarding the couple's net worth, she alluded to her health problems and said, "Look, I don't even consider myself wealthy, which is an interesting thing, it can be here today and gone tomorrow. And how I measure riches is by the friends I have and the loved ones that I have and the people that I care about in my life."

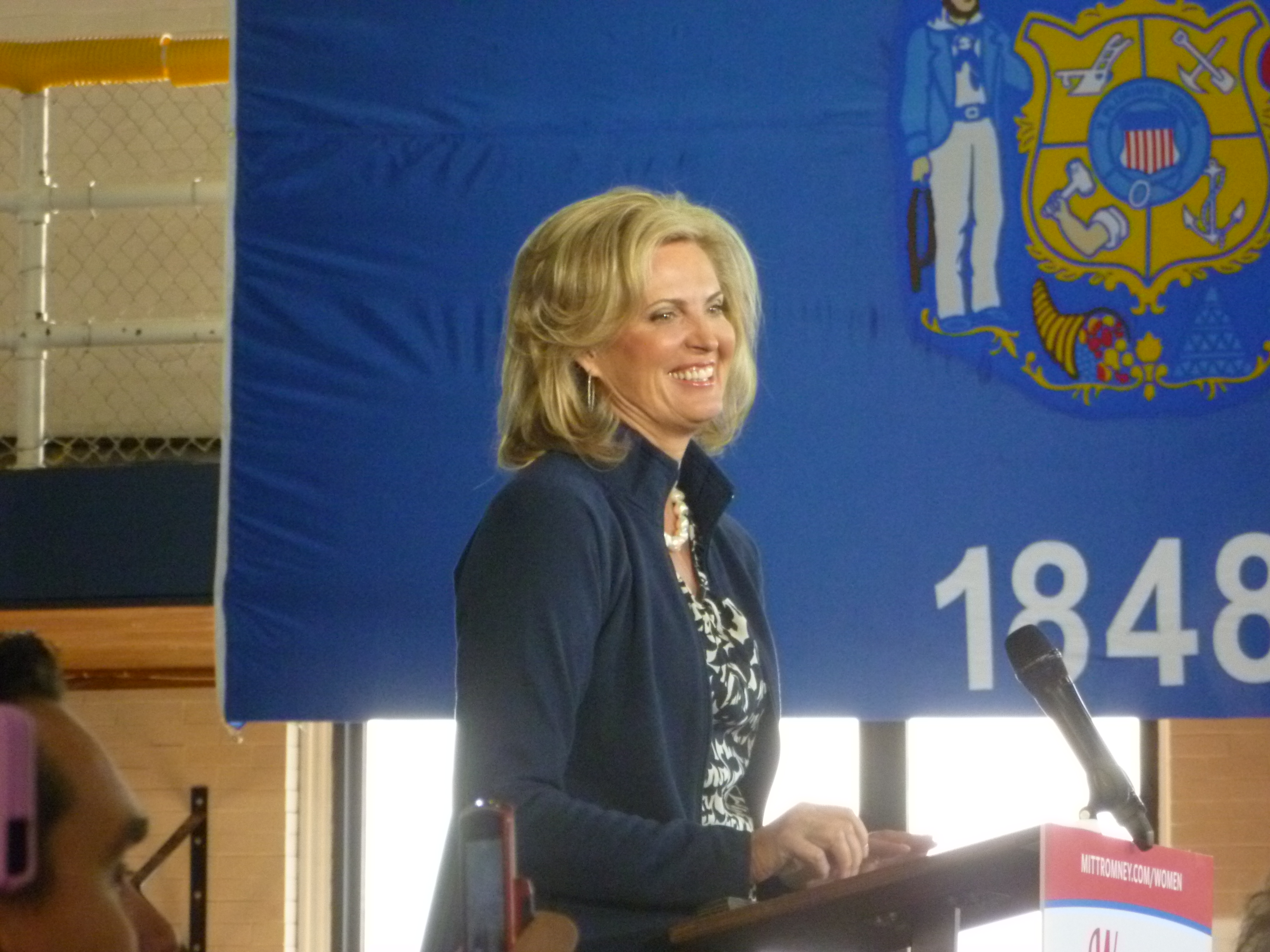
Ann Romney at a September 20, 2012, "Women for Romney" campaign rally at Marquette University in Milwaukee, Wisconsin

In April 2012, Ann Romney was spotlighted when Democratic commentator Hilary Rosen declared Romney to be unfit to address women's economic issues because as a stay-at-home mother, she had "never worked a day in her life". In response, Ann Romney issued her first tweet, saying "I made a choice to stay home and raise five boys. Believe me, it was hard work." Rosen apologized the following day. Like all presidential candidates' wives, her fashion choices came under scrutiny, with some critics praising her for a contemporary look that avoided standard campaign appearance clichés, while others said she lacked consistency and did not seem to be using the services of a stylist. On August 28, Romney delivered a prime-time speech before the 2012 Republican National Convention in Tampa, Florida, in which she stressed her own background and her family experiences, in an appeal to women voters. By early October, she and son Tagg had convinced the campaign to spend more time emphasizing her husband's personal nature and character, rather than simply present issue and record arguments against Obama.

In the November 6, 2012, general election, Mitt Romney lost as President Obama was re-elected. The couple, along with the senior campaign staff, had thought they were going to win up until polls closed that evening and returns started coming in. Ann cried as her husband concluded their chances were over, then appeared stricken as she went on stage with him following his concession speech.

== Subsequent activities ==
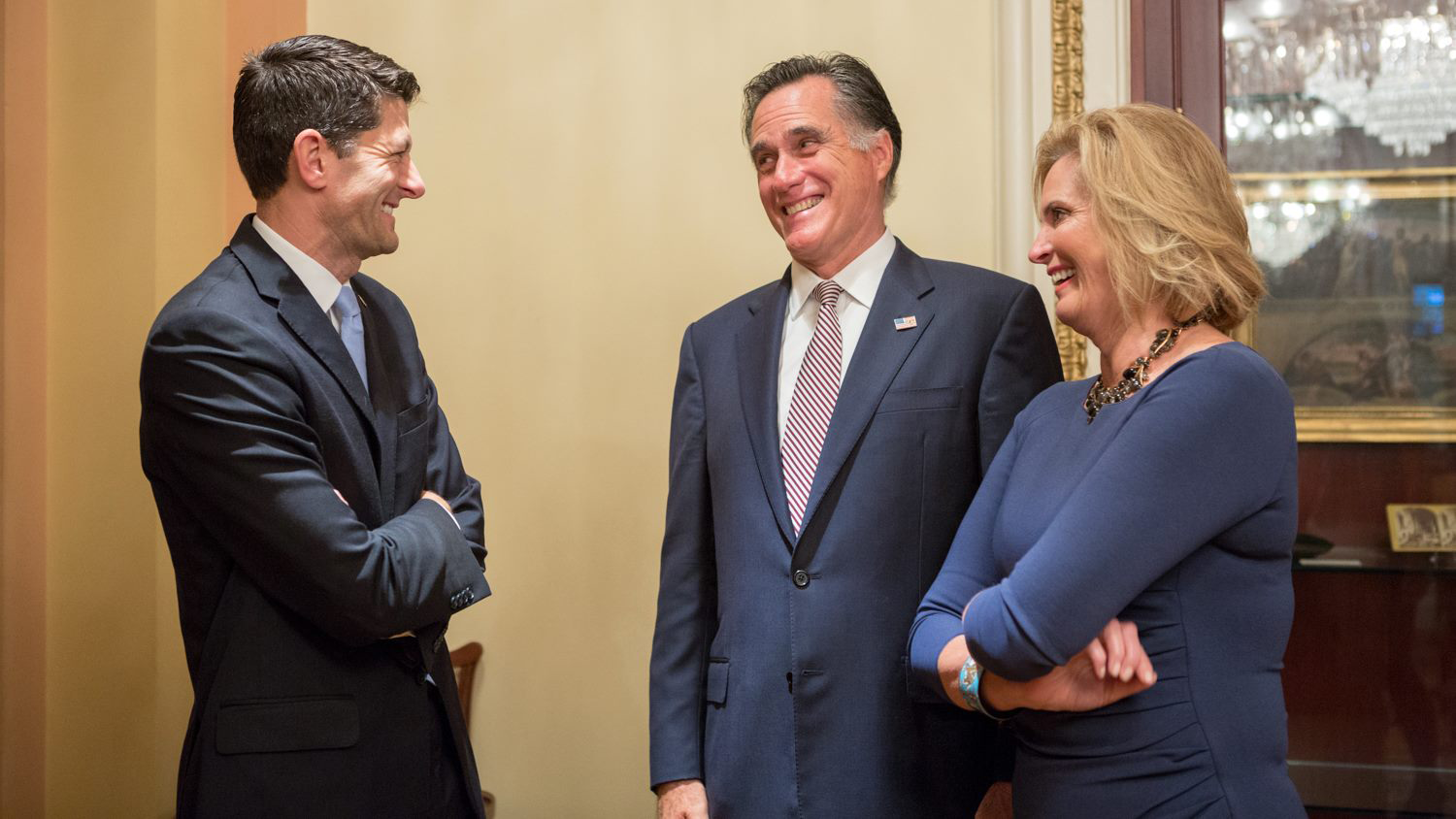
Romney with her husband and his 2012 running mate Paul Ryan on October 29, 2015, the day of Ryan's election and ascension to Speaker of the United States House of Representatives

Following the election, Ann Romney received an offer to appear on the spring 2013 season of Dancing with the Stars, but although she was a fan of the show, she declined: "I would've loved to have done it, and I am turning 64, and I started thinking about it. I'm not really as flexible as I should be." She still mourned the election loss, perhaps more than her husband did. In October 2013, she published, and made promotional appearances for, The Romney Family Table: Sharing Home-Cooked Recipes & Favorite Traditions, a cookbook that made the New York Times Best Seller list.

Most of the couple's time was spent seeing their grandchildren, who by 2018 numbered twenty-three (and then subsequently rose to twenty-four by 2018) (with their first great-grandchild arriving in 2021). They purchased a house in the Deer Valley area of Park City, Utah, in a return to that state, followed by a property capable of equestrian use in Holladay, Utah, where they plan to tear down an existing house and build a new one. The Romneys also gained long-sought permission to replace their La Jolla home with a much bigger one. With the new acquisitions the couple briefly had five homes, located near each of their five sons and respective families. They then sold the condominium in Belmont and decided to make their main residence in Utah, including switching voter registration.

In 2014, the Ann Romney Center for Neurological Diseases was opened at the Brigham and Women's Hospital (a teaching hospital of Harvard Medical School) in Boston. With a fundraising goal of $50 million, the center was created to focus on research into Alzheimer's disease, multiple sclerosis, Amyotrophic lateral sclerosis, Parkinson's disease, and brain tumors. The center has some 250 scientists and researchers on its staff. Romney holds the position of Global Ambassador there, and she gives inspirational talks based on overcoming the challenges of living with a disease. She has said of this role, "I know what it's like to be desperate. I know what it's like to have no hope. And I don't want people to feel that way anymore. I am going to give people hope." Overall, she sees the center as helping to connect researchers working in different areas and to provide monies for experimental approaches and treatments that are too new or unproven for the National Institute of Health to fund.

"It's like: [mimicking the media] 'We don't like you; how come?' It's like, really? ... The whole thing, with the attacks from everything, you develop – a bubble. From that. A protective bubble. Which you have to do. You have to. Whatever that bubble then projects to somebody is really not what's inside the bubble."

— Ann Romney describing life in the political world, 2015

During 2014, speculation about Mitt Romney staging a third presidential run increased. Ann Romney's reaction was to say it would not happen: "Done. Completely. Not only Mitt and I are done, but the kids are done. Done. Done. Done." However, like her husband, she left open the slight possibility that things could change in this regard, and by January 2015 was reported by Romney advisors to be supporting the possibility as he seriously considered a third presidential bid. In any event, he soon decided against making a run.

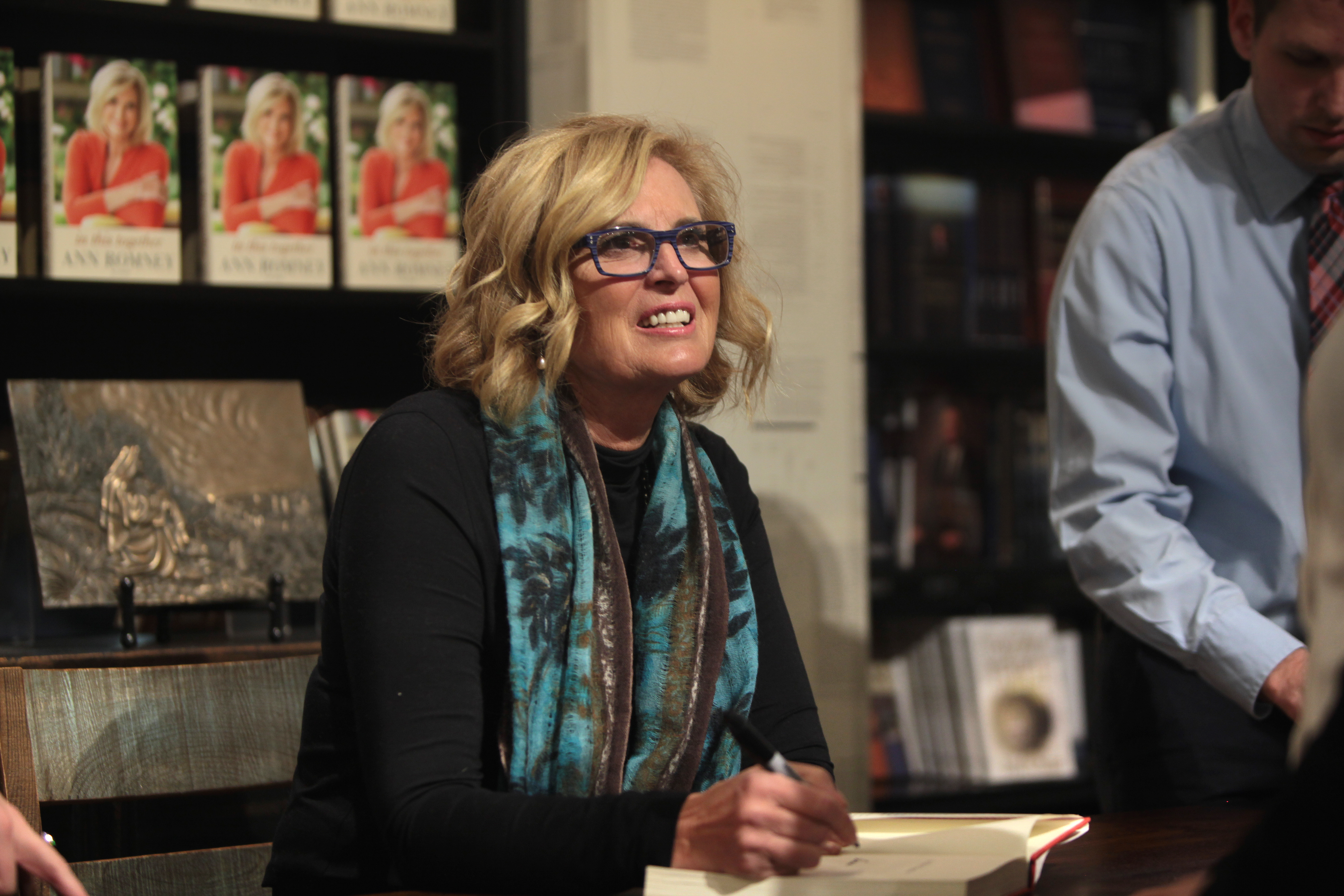
Romney at a book signing in December 2015 in Gilbert, Arizona.

In March 2015, her book Whatever You Choose to Be: 8 Tips for the Road Ahead was published, based upon a commencement address she gave the year before at Southern Utah University. This was followed in September 2015 when her memoir In This Together: My Story was published. In it she discussed her diagnosis of multiple sclerosis, the different treatments she found beneficial, and the important role her family played. The book became popular among those affected by the disease.

During the course of the 2016 election cycle, Romney expressed sympathy toward Democratic front-runner Hillary Clinton since she had also experienced claims of not being relatable. She was also puzzled by Republican front-runner Donald Trump's success despite touting his wealth whereas the Romneys had not, yet still were criticized for not relating to common voters because of theirs. Though highly critical of her husband after he spoke negatively of the Trump candidacy in March 2016, Trump praised Ann Romney as "a lovely woman". Ann Romney earned at least one vote for president when her husband cast a write-in vote for her in November 2016, later saying he voted for "a person who I admire deeply, who I think would be an excellent president".

== Spouse of Senator from Utah ==
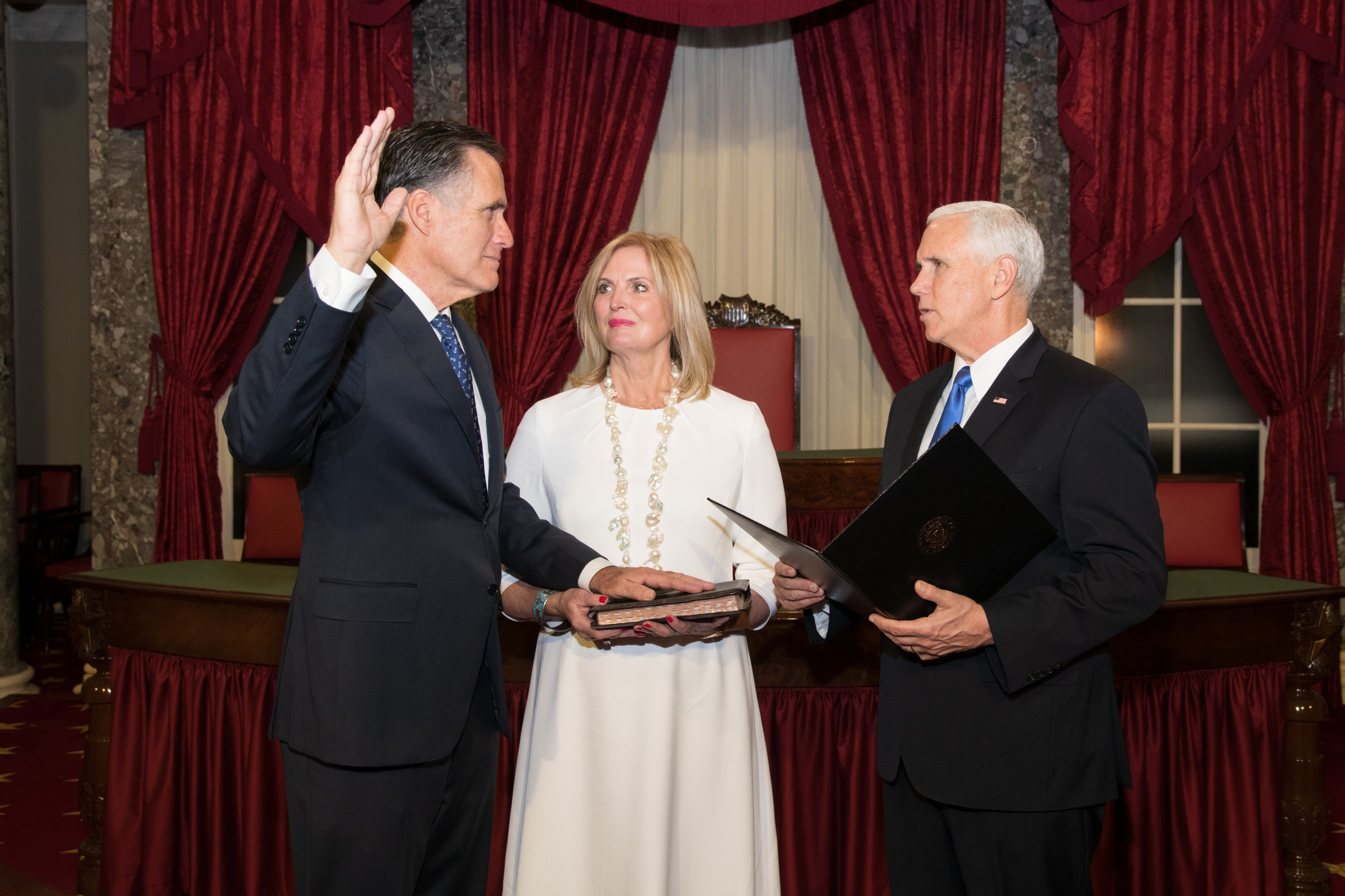
Romney watching her husband being sworn in as United States Senator from Utah by Vice President Mike Pence, January 3, 2019

Two years later Romney hit the campaign trail again, this time to support her husband in the 2018 United States Senate election in Utah. It was a run that she encouraged him to make, saying "This is a time when you're needed. You have deep roots in this state. Your family heritage is in this state. And when people are needed you gotta step up." In this case, as in the past, he relied strongly on her advice.

During campaign appearances she spoke critically of the political climate in the United States, saying that civility and kindness had been lost, and she noted that she never read comments to her posts on social media due to the anonymous negativity found there.

His campaign was successful and he took office in January 2019. Living in Washington, however, had little appeal to her, and she rarely joined her husband at the townhouse they bought there. In April 2019, the couple's self-help volume Simple Truths for an Abundant Life: From One Generation to Another was published. In it they described how their own life experiences illustrated ways for principles for handling different aspects and stages of life.

During the attempts to overturn the 2020 United States presidential election, travel to Palm Beach, Florida, where some of her horses were kept but where MAGA followers were quite upset by her husband's vote on the first presidential impeachment, highlighted the vitriolic level of ongoing American political discourse. She had a feeling that something bad might happen on January 6, 2021, and unsuccessfully urged her husband to stay away that day.

In 2021, the couple sold their house in La Jolla. They continued to host an annual family get-together at their expanded summer compound on Lake Winnipesaukee, an event that by this point brought forty people to it.

== Awards and honors ==
In 2005, Ann Romney received an honorary degree from Mount Ida College. In 2006, she received the MS Society Inspiration Award from the Central New England Chapter of the National Multiple Sclerosis Society and the 2006 Lifetime Achievement Award from Salt Lake City-based Operation Kids. In May 2008, she shared with her husband the Canterbury Medal from The Becket Fund for Religious Liberty, for "refus[ing] to compromise their principles and faith" during that year's presidential campaign. In 2014, Romney received an honorary degree in public service from Southern Utah University, for "her contributions of time, funding and support on behalf of children and families." In 2019, she received the Public Leadership in Neurology Award from the American Brain Foundation for her work in multiple sclerosis research and awareness.

Honorary titles
Preceded by Chuck Hunt; Acting as First Gentleman of Massachusetts	First Lady of Massachusetts; 2003–2007	Succeeded by Diane Patrick
