= First ladies and gentlemen of Massachusetts =

Wives of governors of the U.S. state of Massachusetts

First Lady of Massachusetts
- Seal of the State of Massachusetts

- Incumbent; Joanna Lydgate (as "first partner") (Note: Governor Maura Healey has never married, though her partner Joanna Lydgate has assumed the role under the style "first partner") since January 5, 2023
- Residence: Massachusetts State House, Boston
- Inaugural holder: Dorothy Quincy
- Formation: October 25, 1780; 245 years ago (Note: not counting spouses of colonial governors)

The style of First Lady or First Gentleman of Massachusetts (alternatively "first partner") is the honorary position given to the spouse or significant other of the Governor of Massachusetts. If not counting for the spouses of acting governors, to date all of the state's first spouses have been women. The role is currently being filled by Joanna Lydgate, the partner of current governor Maura Healey. Since Healey and Lydgate are not married, Lydgate has adopted the title "first partner".

== List ==
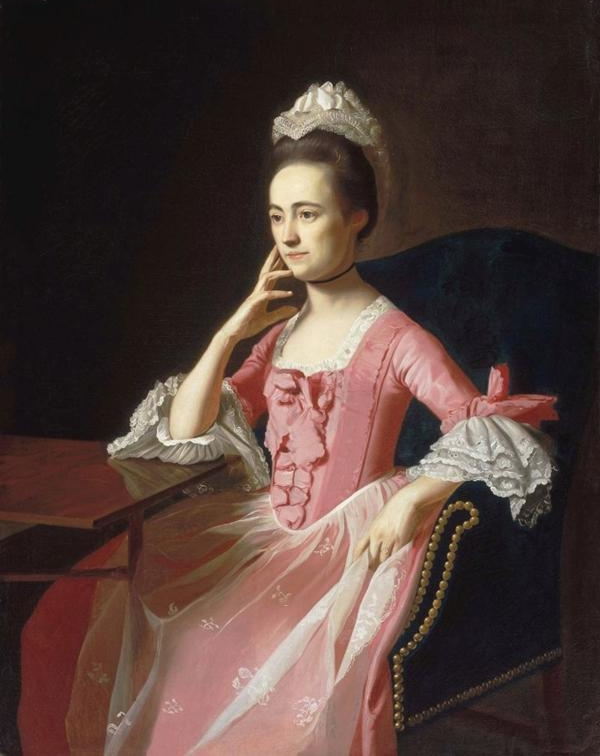
Dorothy Quincy Hancock

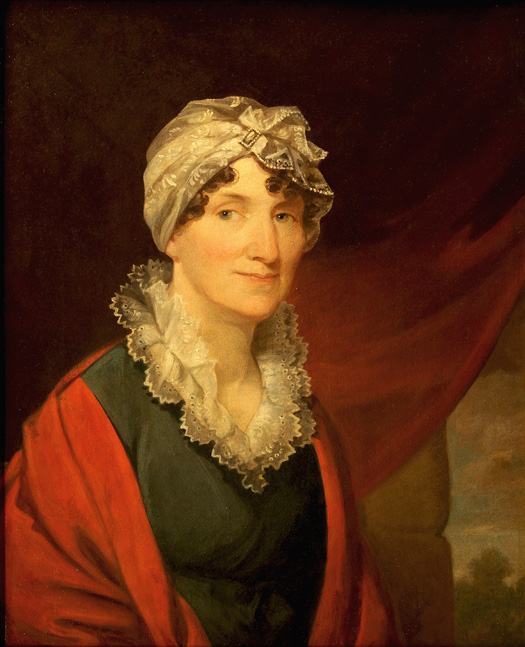
Ann Gerry

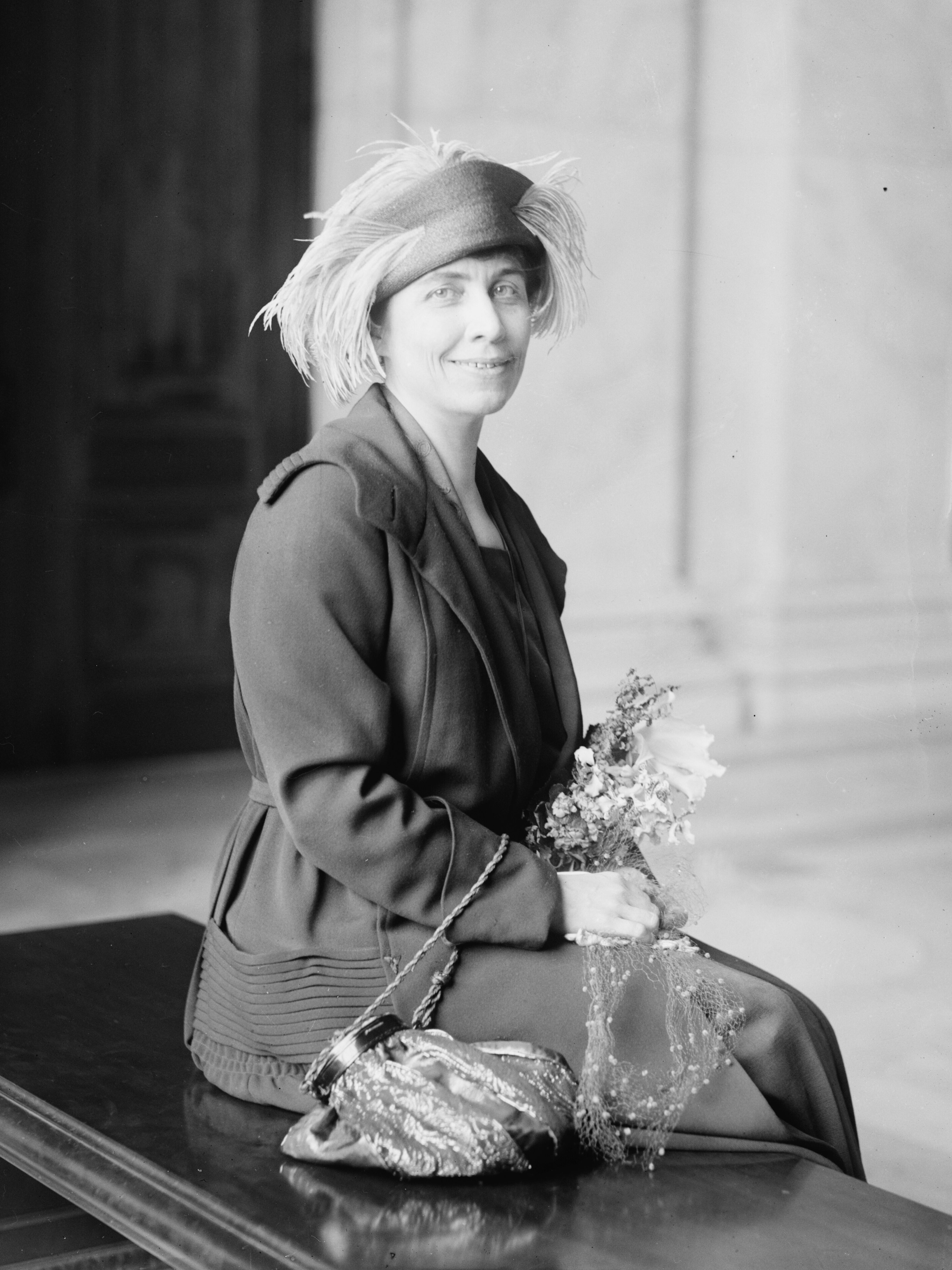
Grace Coolidge

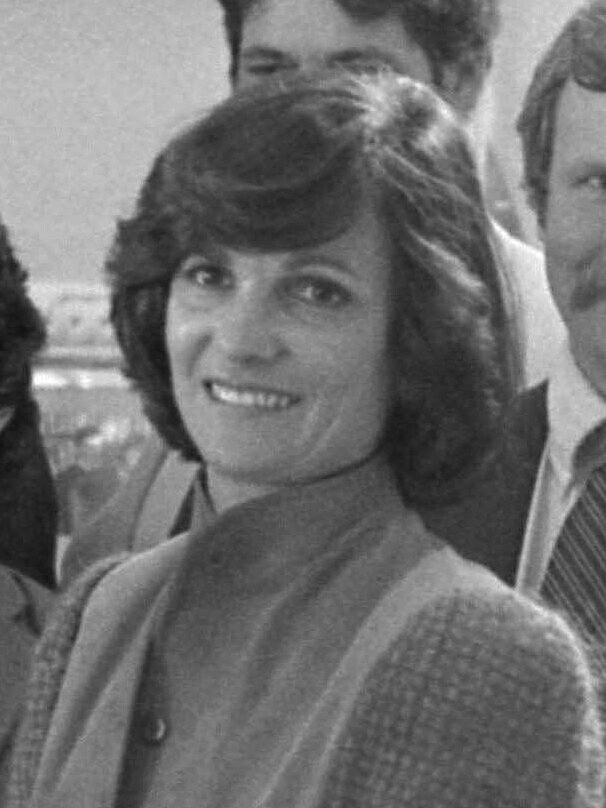
Kitty Dukakis

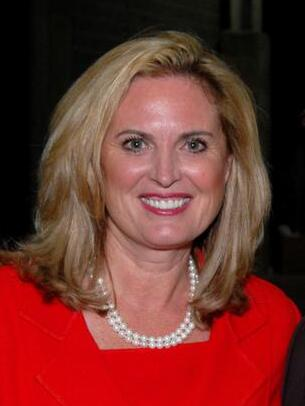
Ann Romney

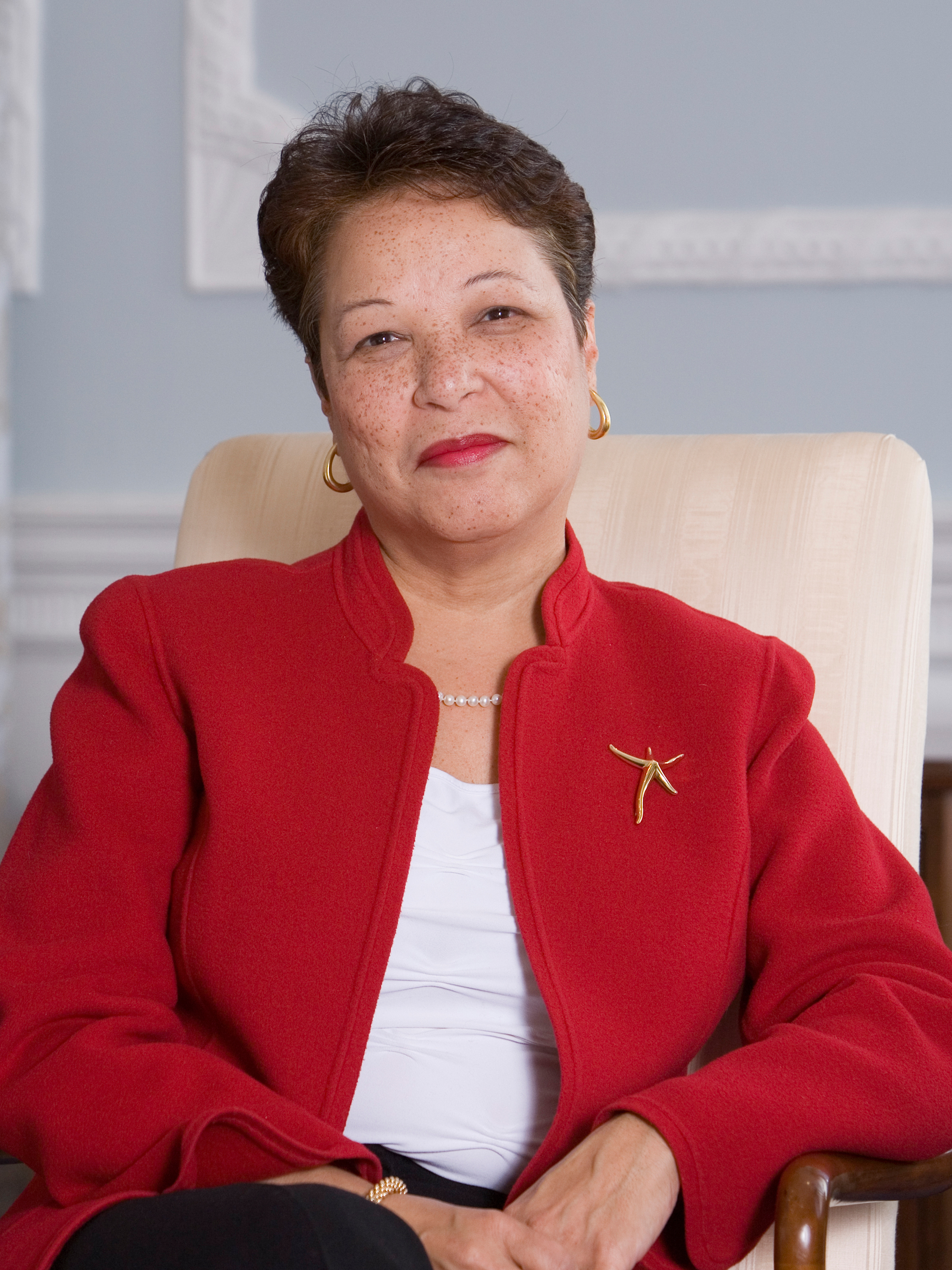
Diane Patrick

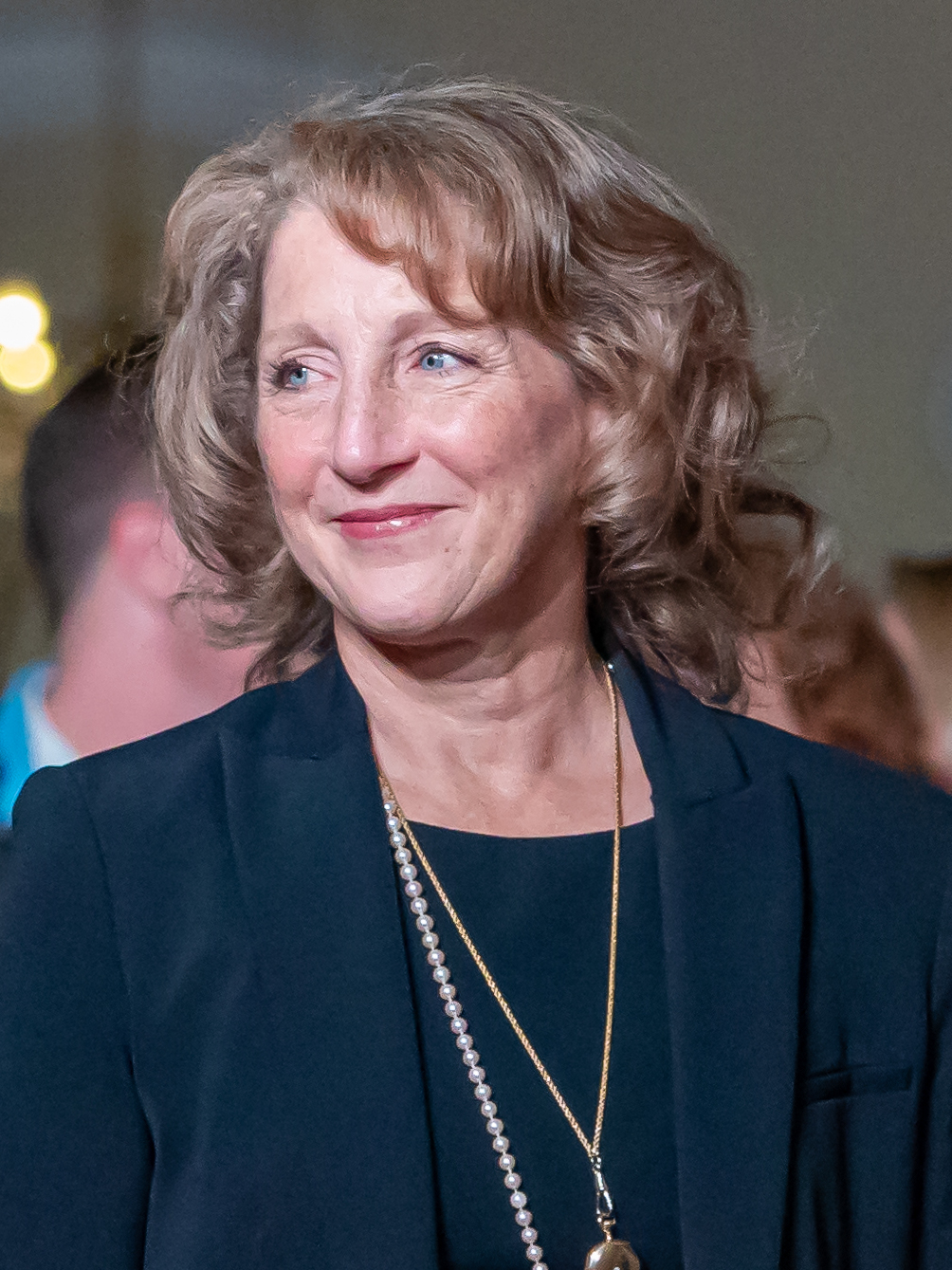
Lauren Shadt Baker

Status

Denotes spouse of an acting governor

Name	Took office	Left office	Spouse of
Dorothy Quincy Hancock	1780	1785	John Hancock
Elizabeth Erving	1785	1787	James Bowdoin
Dorothy Quincy Hancock	1787	1793	John Hancock
Elizabeth Wells	1793	1797	Samuel Adams
Elizabeth Hyslop	1797	1799	Increase Sumner
Sarah Hooker	1800	1807	Caleb Strong
Martha Langdon	1807	1808	James Sullivan
Rebecca Gore	1809	1810	Christopher Gore
Ann Gerry	1810	1812	Elbridge Gerry
Sarah Hooker	1812	1816	Caleb Strong
Lucy Smith	1816	1823	John Brooks
Caroline Langdon	1823	1825	William Eustis
Penelope Winslow Sever	1825	1834	Levi Lincoln Jr.
Eliza Bancroft Davis	1834	1835	John Davis
Charlotte Gray Brooks	1836	1840	Edward Everett
Charlotte Morton	1840	1841	Marcus Morton
Eliza Bancroft Davis	1841	1843	John Davis
Charlotte Morton	1843	1844	Marcus Morton
Harriet Briggs	1844	1851	George N. Briggs
Sarah Thayer	1851	1853	George S. Boutwell
Sarah Parker Allen	1853	1854	John H. Clifford
Marianne Cornelia Giles	1854	1855	Emory Washburn
Helen Cobb	1855	1858	Henry Gardner
Mary Theredosia Palmer	1858	1861	Nathaniel P. Banks
Eliza Jane Hersey	1861	1866	John Albion Andrew
Elvira Hazard Bullock	1866	1869	Alexander Bullock
Mary Bucklin	1869	1872	William Claflin
Hannah Sweetser	1872	1874	William B. Washburn
Louisa Augusta Beecher	1875	1876	William Gaston
Angle Erickson Powell	1876	1879	Alexander H. Rice
Isabella Hayden	1879	1880	Thomas Talbot
Mary Glover	1880	1882	John Davis Long
Vacant (Note: Mary Glover, spouse of John Davis Long, died in office, in 1882)	1882	1883	John Davis Long
Vacant (Note: At the time of his governorship, Benjamin Butler was a widower. His spouse Sarah Hildreth Butler died in 1876)	1883	1884	Benjamin Butler
Susan Simonds	1884	1887	George D. Robinson
Anna Coffin Ray	1887	1890	Oliver Ames
Angie Moore Peck	1890	1891	John Q. A. Brackett
Margaret Manning Swan	1891	1894	William E. Russell
Isabella Nesmith	1894	1896	Frederic T. Greenhalge
Edith Prescott	1896	1900	Roger Wolcott
Vacant (Note: Winthrop M. Crane was unmarried during his governorship. He would later marry Josephine B. Crane)	1900	1903	Winthrop M. Crane
Clara Elizabeth Smith	1903	1905	John L. Bates
Alice Keneston Moodie (Note: Presumably; William Lewis Douglas was known to have had two wives, the second being Alice Keneston Moodie. It is not clear who his wife at the time of his governorship was.)	1905	1906	William Lewis Douglas
Charlotte Howe Johnson	1906	1909	Curtis Guild Jr.
Nannie Bristow	1909	1911	Eben Sumner Draper
Lilla Rollins Sturtevant	1911	1914	Eugene Foss
Vacant (Note: David I. Walsh never married)	1914	1916	David I. Walsh
Ella Esther Thompson	1916	1919	Samuel W. McCall
Grace Coolidge	1919	1921	Calvin Coolidge
Mary Young	1921	1925	Channing H. Cox
Viola Theresa Davenport	1925	1929	Alvan T. Fuller
Eleanor Hamilton Wallace	1929	1931	Frank G. Allen
Harriet Zelda Tyson	1931	1935	Joseph B. Ely
Vacant (Note: James Michael Curley was a widower at the time of his governorship. He remarried afterwards.)	1935	1937	James Michael Curley
Marion Hurley	1937	1939	Charles F. Hurley
Alice Wesselhoeft	1939	1945	Leverett Saltonstall
Helen Noonan	1945	1947	Maurice J. Tobin
Rebecca Crowninshield Browne	1947	1949	Robert F. Bradford
Marie Dever (Note: Paul A. Dever never married and thus the role of First Lady was fullfiled by his sister Marie)	1949	1953	Paul A. Dever
Marie Pratt	1953	1957	Christian Herter
Kay Furcolo	1957	1961	Foster Furcolo
Barbara Welch Gibbons	1963	1965	Endicott Peabody
Giovannina Benedetto	1965	1969	John A. Volpe
Jessie Sargent	1969	1975	Francis Sargent
Kitty Dukakis	1975	1979	Michael Dukakis
Jody King	1979	1983	Edward J. King
Kitty Dukakis	1983	1991	Michael Dukakis
Susan Roosevelt Weld	1991	1997	Bill Weld
Jan Garnett	1997	2001	Paul Cellucci
Chuck Hunt	2001	2003	Jane Swift
Ann Romney	2003	2007	Mitt Romney
Diane Patrick	2007	2015	Deval Patrick
Lauren Schadt Baker	2015	2023	Charlie Baker
Joanna Lydgate ("first partner")	2023	Incumbent	Maura Healey

== See also ==
- List of governors of Massachusetts
