= Diane Patrick (lawyer) =

American lawyer, former First Lady of Massachusetts

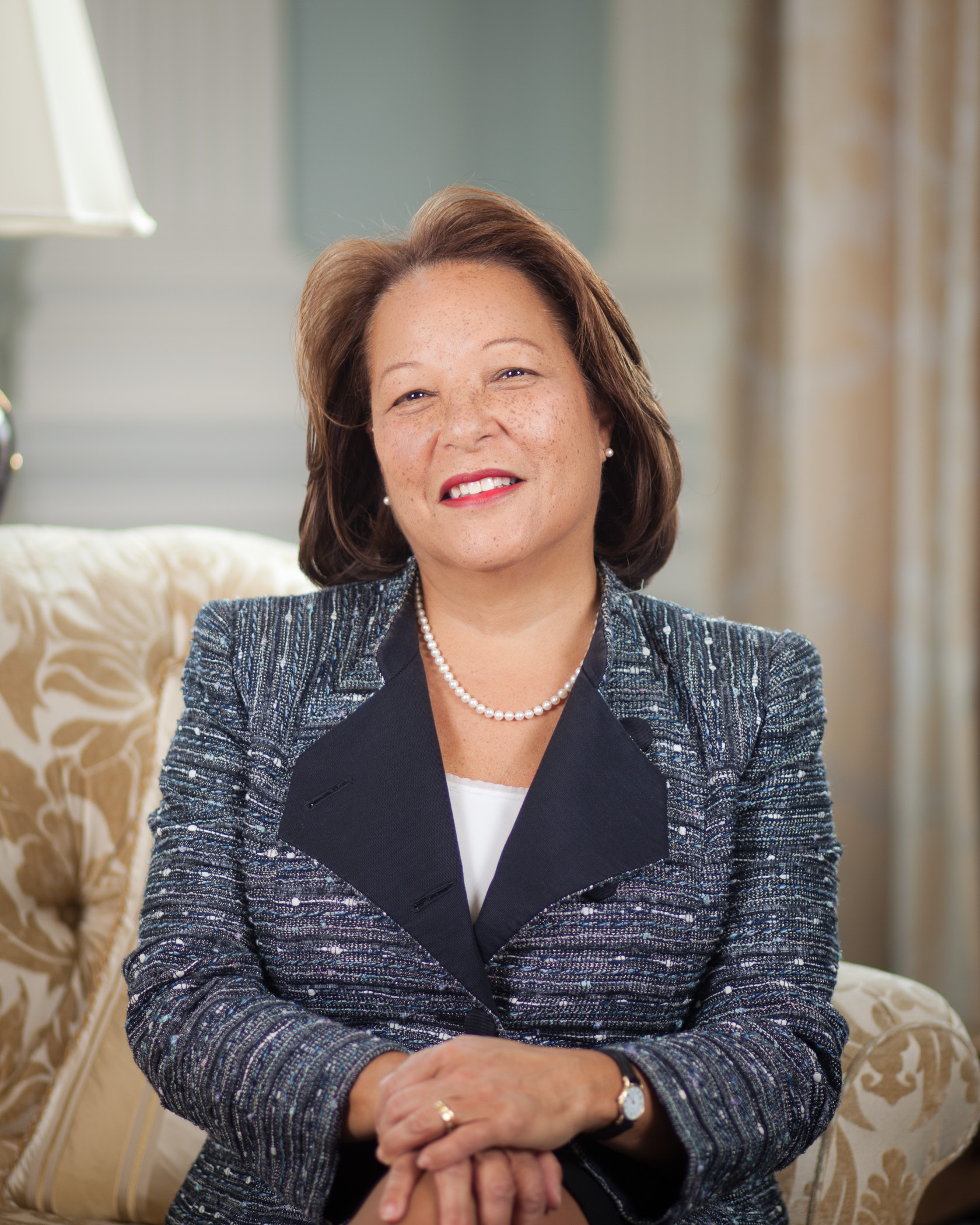
- Patrick in 2011

First Lady of Massachusetts
- In office January 4, 2007 – January 8, 2015
- Governor: Deval Patrick
- Preceded by: Ann Romney
- Succeeded by: Lauren Baker

Personal details
- Born: Diane Beamus; December 17, 1951 (age 74) Brooklyn, New York, U.S.
- Spouse: Deval Patrick (m. 1984)
- Relations: Bertram L. Baker (grandfather)
- Children: 2
- Education: Queens College (BA); Loyola Marymount University (JD)

Diane B. Patrick (née Bemus; born December 17, 1951) is an American lawyer specializing in labor and employment law. She served as the First Lady of Massachusetts from 2007 to 2015 during the gubernatorial tenure of her husband, former Massachusetts Governor Deval Patrick. She was a partner in the labor and employment department of the Boston-based law firm, Ropes & Gray.

== Biography ==
=== Early life, career and education ===
Patrick, the youngest of three children, was born Diane Bemus in the Bedford-Stuyvesant neighborhood of Brooklyn, New York City, to John Charles Bemus and Lilian (née Baker) Bemus. Her father was an electrician from a mixed race family of black and white ancestry in Vicksburg, Mississippi. John Charles Bemus, who enlisted in the United States Navy at the age of 16, had to pass as completely white in order to work on a naval ship outside of a galley kitchen. He was trained as an electrician by the U.S. Navy and served on board a minesweeper which protected Allied supply routes to the Soviet Union during World War II. Bemus was injured by shrapnel from a depth charge explosion in 1943. Her mother, Lilian Bemus, was a schoolteacher who held bachelor's and master's degrees from Hunter College. She taught in Brooklyn schools for more than 30 years, until her retirement from the profession in 1985.

Diane Patrick's maternal grandfather was Bertram L. Baker, a New York politician who immigrated to the United States from Nevis in the then-British West Indies in 1915. In 1948, Baker was elected to the New York State Assembly, becoming the first black person elected to any office by voters in Brooklyn in history, as well as the second Nevisian-born person to serve in the New York State Assembly after Alexander Hamilton. Patrick has credited her "proud" West Indian family for emphasizing education and professional success.

She was raised in Bedford–Stuyvesant, where she lived in a brownstone with her extended family, including her parents, her brother and sister, grandparents, an aunt, cousins, and two dogs. Her family later moved to Hollis, Queens, when she was still young. Beamus graduated from a public high school in Queens, New York, when she was 16-years-old. She received her Bachelor of Arts in early childhood education with honors from Queens College in 1972. She worked as an elementary school teacher in the City School District of the City of New York for five years, until her job was eliminated during the city's fiscal crisis in the 1970s. She then moved to Los Angeles to attend Loyola Law School, where she received a full scholarship and earned her Juris Doctor in 1980. She was awarded the American Jurisprudence Award, won Best Appellant Brief in Statewide Moot Court Competition, and received the Outstanding Graduate Award for outstanding academic performance and citizenship while studying at Loyola Marymount's law school.

Following law school, she was hired by a Los Angeles-based law firm, O'Melveny & Myers. When she was a third-year associate attorney, Bemus and three other co-workers relocated to New York City, where they established O'Melveny & Myers' new New York branch office in 1983.

Her first marriage, which ended while she was in Los Angeles, was plagued by domestic and emotional abuse committed by her then husband. In 2006, she described her first husband as extremely abusive, saying "I was very afraid...He said, 'If you can't be with me, you're not going to be with anybody else,' and that was very frightening." She was twenty-five years old when she was introduced to Deval Patrick, a recent Harvard Law graduate who had also moved to Los Angeles to clerk for a judge. Though she initially warned Patrick that it may not be wise to continue their relationship due to her past marriage, "There were times I said to Deval, I don't know if you want to be with me, because I don't know what my husband would be inclined to do to us", the couple remained together.

Patrick, who was known as Diane Whiting at the time, managed to divorce her first husband. She married her second husband, Deval Patrick, on May 5, 1984, at their home in Brooklyn. The couple had two daughters, Sarah and Katherine. In 1986, Diane and Deval Patrick moved to Massachusetts.

Diane Patrick was hired as a lawyer by Harvard University. She was promoted to director and associate vice president of human resources at Harvard University in 1992.

Their respective law careers required the Patrick's to live separately for several years, only seeing each other regularly on weekends. They moved to a house in Milton, Massachusetts, in 1989. In 1994, Deval Patrick was appointed to a position in the United States Department of Justice, necessitating that the family move to Washington D.C. Diane Patrick left her position at Harvard University and joined the Hogan & Harston law firm in Washington from 1994 to 1995. Soon after, Diane Patrick and their daughters moved back to Milton full-time, while Deval continued to work in Washington.

Upon returning to Massachusetts, Patrick joined Ropes & Gray, a well-known Boston law firm, in 1995, as a labor and employment attorney.

=== First Lady of Massachusetts ===
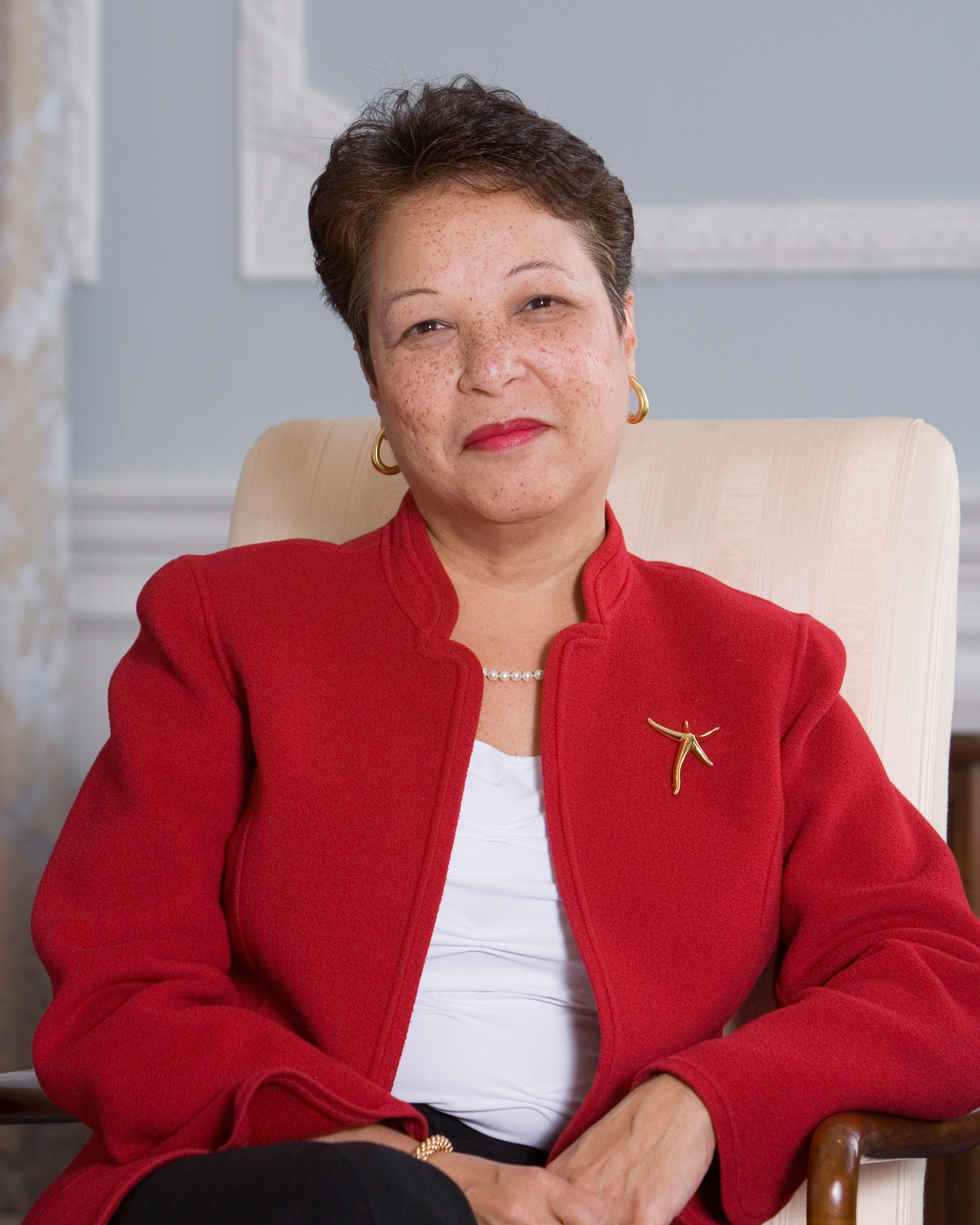
Patrick circa 2007

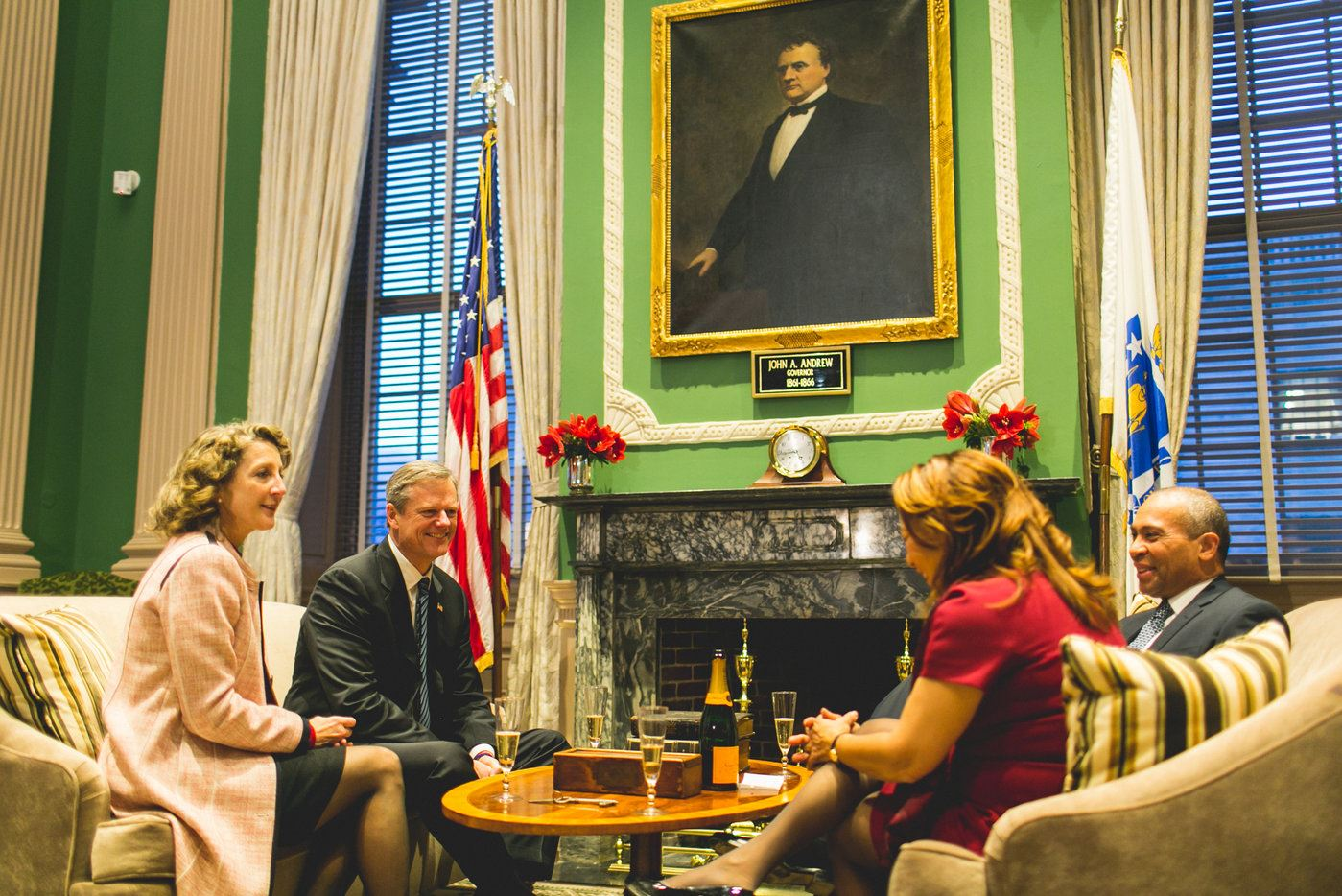
At the end of her husband's governorship, the Patricks meet with incoming governor Charlie Baker and his wife, Lauren

Diane Patrick actively campaigned on behalf of her husband during the 2006 Massachusetts gubernatorial election. Deval Patrick won the race, defeating Republican Kerry Healey. He was sworn into office in January 2007, making Diane Patrick the new First Lady of Massachusetts. She would serve in that position for her husband's two terms, while continuing to practice law at Ropes & Gray.

Patrick was admitted to McLean Hospital for depression, anxiety, and exhaustion in early 2007. The governor and first lady had been the subjects of a series of critical and unflattering stories, including the hiring of a short-lived chief of staff by the first lady, which she says contributed to a decline in her mental health at the time. She took a seven week leave of absence from her law firm to recover. Governor Deval Patrick contemplated his resignation in response to the toll the campaign and public life was taking on his wife.

She spoke publicly of her battle and recovery from depression a year later. Patrick became a vocal advocate for mental health issues and treatments throughout her eight years as Massachusetts first lady. She also advocated for survivors of domestic abuse, remarking in a speech that, "The greatest accomplishment for me has been to discover that I had a voice in a particular area, and that is in the area of domestic violence and sexual assault." She continued to work on behalf of both issues after leaving the role of state first lady.

Diane Patrick remained as an active partner with Ropes & Gray while simultaneously serving as first lady. Some observers felt that the first lady would have to leave her law career, but Patrick expanded her role at the firm during this time. In 2010, Patrick was appointed the chair of Ropes & Gray's diversity committee, which she headed for most of the 2010s. Diane Patrick was also promoted to a co-managing partner at Ropes & Gray's head Boston office in 2013.

=== Present role ===
Diane Patrick retired from Ropes & Gray in 2016 after twenty-one years with the law firm.

In 2015, soon after leaving the position of state first lady, Patrick was inducted into the Academy of Distinguished Bostonians and received the Cushing-Gavin Management Attorney Award for Excellence from the Labor Guild of Boston. Diane Patrick was also awarded the Champion of Justice Award from the Discovering Justice Foundation in 2017 and the Public Service Award from the Boston Bar Association in 2019.

In 2018, Patrick was diagnosed with stage 1 uterine cancer, but was declared cancer free by 2019 following surgery and radiation treatment. Deval Patrick initially declined to run for President of the United States in 2020 due to his wife's cancer diagnosis. Following her treatment, Diane Patrick encouraged her husband to enter the race in November 2019 following months of discussions within their family. Patrick also consulted with former First Lady Michelle Obama, a friend, for advice on the presidential race and her own role as a potential first lady. If Deval Patrick had been elected, Diane Patrick said she would have focused on childhood education, mental health and women's rights.

Diane Patrick actively campaigned for her husband in New Hampshire in the run-up to the 2020 New Hampshire Democratic presidential primary. Deval Patrick withdrew from the race after placing tenth in the New Hampshire primary.

Diane Patrick has served as a trustee for several organizations, including ArtsBoston, Brigham and Women's Hospital, Cambridge College, and the Massachusetts Maritime Academy. She has also been a member of the boards of directors for the Epiphany School in Dorchester, Jane Doe, Inc., Massachusetts General Hospital, Mass General Brigham, the Posse Foundation, and United Way of Massachusetts Bay.

Honorary titles
Preceded by Ann Romney	First Lady of Massachusetts; 2007 – 2015	Succeeded by Lauren Baker
