= Bertram L. Baker =

Former New York state assemblyman from 1949 to 1970

Member of the New York State Assembly from Kings County's 17th district
- In office January 1, 1949 – December 31, 1970
- Preceded by: John J. Walsh
- Succeeded by: Calvin Williams
- Constituency: Kings County's 17th district (1949-1954); Kings County's 16th district (1955-1965); 46th district (1966); 56th district (1967-1970)

Personal details
- Born: January 10, 1898 Nevis, Leeward Islands
- Died: March 8, 1985 (aged 87) Brooklyn, New York, U.S.
- Party: Democratic
- Spouse: Irene
- Children: Marian Baker-Howell and Lillian Bemus
- Education: La Salle Extension University, Chicago

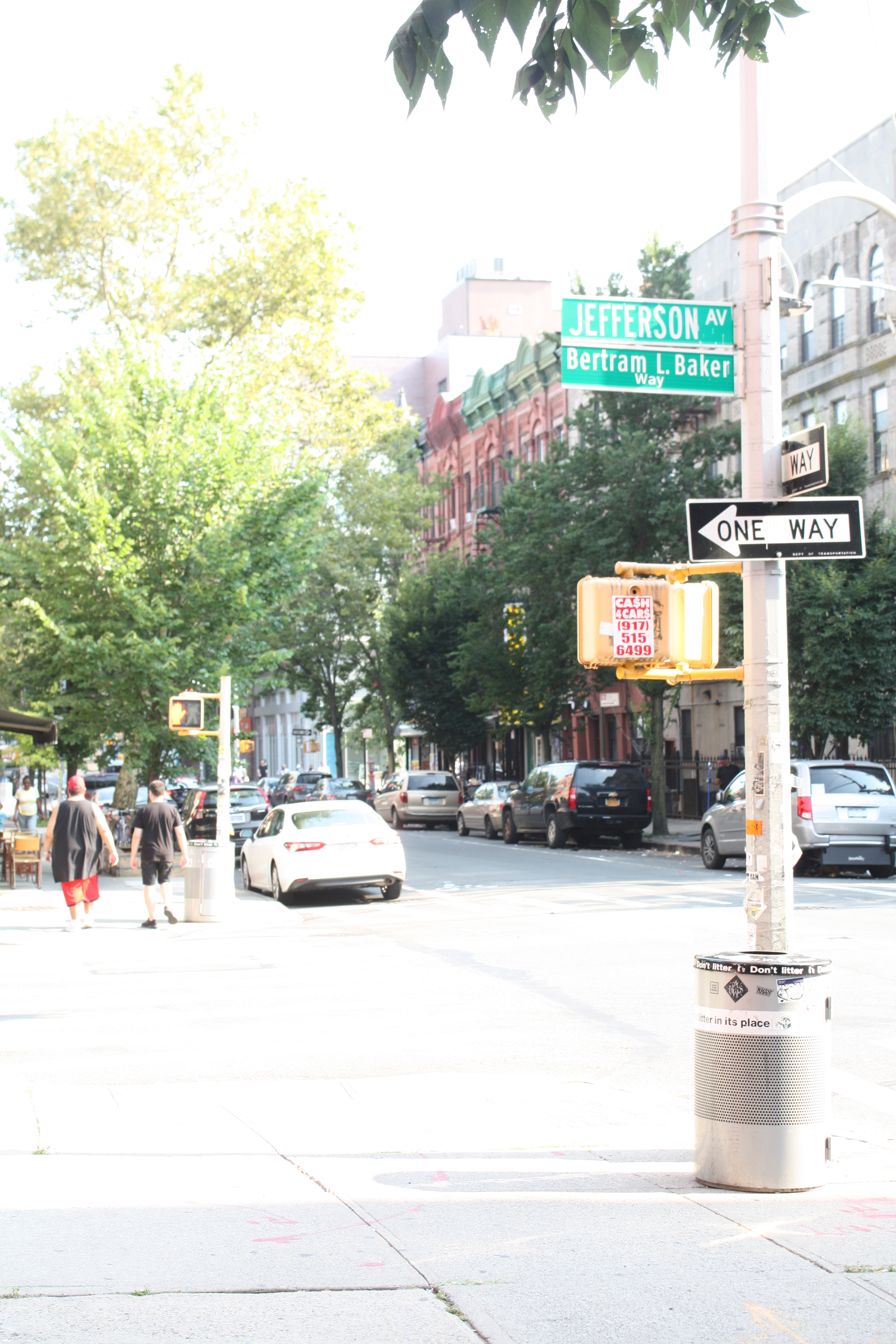
Bertram Baker Way (Jefferson Avenue between Tompkins and Throop Avenues) in Brooklyn, New York

Bertram Llewellyn Baker (January 10, 1898 – March 8, 1985) was an American politician who was a member of the New York State Assembly from 1948 to 1970, representing central Brooklyn, New York. He was the first Black person elected to any office by voters in Brooklyn.

== Early life ==
Baker was born on the island of Nevis in the British West Indies and immigrated to the United States via Ellis Island in 1915, when he was 17 years old. He settled in Brooklyn, N.Y., obtained a degree in accounting from La Salle Extension University correspondence school in Chicago, and became a U.S. citizen in 1924.

Baker became a bookkeeper at Cox & Nostrand, a lighting manufacturer in Brooklyn, where he worked his way up to head of the bookkeeping and then the accounting departments. After being denied a promotion that he said was because of his race, he went into private practice as an accountant.

== Political career ==
In the early decades of the 20th century, Blacks were largely aligned with the Republican Party, the party of Abraham Lincoln. Baker saw that Democrats were growing in numbers and power in Brooklyn, and he joined the local Democratic club, located on Gates Avenue in what is now Bedford-Stuyvesant. The club was controlled by the Irish, but Baker realized that they were the people with whom he — and other Blacks — should align. He recruited other Blacks to the Democratic Party, and after observing white political clubs, formed his own organization, the United Action Democratic Association. His volunteers in Bedford-Stuyvesant delivered votes on Election Days, and Baker gained political influence.

In 1939, Baker was appointed to a patronage job as United States Deputy Collector of Internal Revenue in the income tax division in Brooklyn. Through the 1940s, he served as a "confidential inspector" for John Cashmore, the Brooklyn borough president, an Irish-American, and was a liaison between Cashmore and the growing Black community in central Brooklyn. In 1945, Baker ran for a seat on the New York City Council, but finished in 14th place among candidates from Brooklyn, not high enough to win a seat.

When the state Democratic Party bosses realized that their election slates could no longer remain all white, they made a deal to get Baker elected to office. They promised the local incumbent assemblyman, John J. Walsh, another Irish-American, that if he ran for the party's re-nomination in the primary but then withdrew, they would nominate him for a judgeship instead. With the proper timing, under New York State Law and party rules, the party bosses had the right to appoint a replacement nominee to run for the assembly, and that was Baker.

By that time, his area of Brooklyn was reliably Democratic, and in November 1948, Baker became the first Black person elected to any political office by voters in Brooklyn. (As the result of his election, Baker also became the second person to serve in the New York State Assembly who was born in Nevis, after Alexander Hamilton – something that he was fond of telling.) Baker was a member of the New York State Assembly from 1948 to 1970, sitting in the 167th, 168th, 169th, 170th, 171st, 172nd, 173rd, 174th, 175th, 176th, 177th, 178th, and 179th New York State Legislatures.

During his tenure in the assembly, Baker sponsored bills prohibiting various types of discrimination, most notably New York's fair housing law. The Metcalf-Baker Act, which was sponsored in the State Senate by George R. Metcalf, an upstate Republican, was one of the first laws anywhere that outlawed discrimination in housing. The first version was signed into law by Governor Averell Harriman in 1955 and covered only housing with mortgages insured by the Federal Housing Administration. A revised version was signed by Governor Nelson Rockefeller in 1963 to include all housing except owner-occupied one and two-family dwellings. The federal Fair Housing Act, with even broader reach, was not passed until 1968.

Baker eventually rose to become the assembly's majority whip in 1966 with the emergence of the New York State Black and Puerto Rican Legislative Caucus, and remained in the assembly until his retirement from politics at the end of 1970.

== Personal life ==
Baker married Irene Baker on December 10, 1919. She was born in Brooklyn in 1901. Her parents had immigrated from Nevis four years earlier; Bertram and Irene Baker were also first cousins.

Baker was an avid tennis player, and was the executive secretary of the American Tennis Association from 1936 to 1966, which promoted tennis to Black communities and campaigned for the sport's integration. In that capacity, he championed tennis to many who otherwise could not have played, and helped to successfully negotiate with white tennis administrators to accept Althea Gibson into their competitions. Baker also served as president of the New York State Tennis Association.

== Death ==
Baker died on March 8, 1985, in Brooklyn. He was survived by his wife Irene, his two daughters Marian Baker-Howell of Brooklyn and Lillian Bemus of Queens, four grandchildren, and six great-grandchildren.

== Legacy ==
Baker lived at 399 Jefferson Avenue in Brooklyn for many years. His block, Jefferson Avenue between Tompkins and Throop Avenues, was co-named Bertram L. Baker Way by the New York City Council in 2011.

Baker's granddaughter is Diane Bemus Patrick, an attorney and first lady of Massachusetts from 2007 to 2015.

New York State Assembly
Preceded by John J. Walsh	New York State Assembly; Kings County, 17th District (1948–1954)	Succeeded by Samuel I. Berman
Preceded by John J. Ryan	New York State Assembly; Kings County, 6th District (1955–1965)	Succeeded by district abolished
Preceded by new district	New York State Assembly; 46th District (1966)	Succeeded by Leonard M. Simon
Preceded by Salvatore J. Grieco	New York State Assembly; 56th District (1967–1970)	Succeeded by Calvin Williams
