= Grand Order of Francisco Morazán =

State order of El Salvador

Grand Order of Francisco Morazán Gran Orden de Francisco Morazán
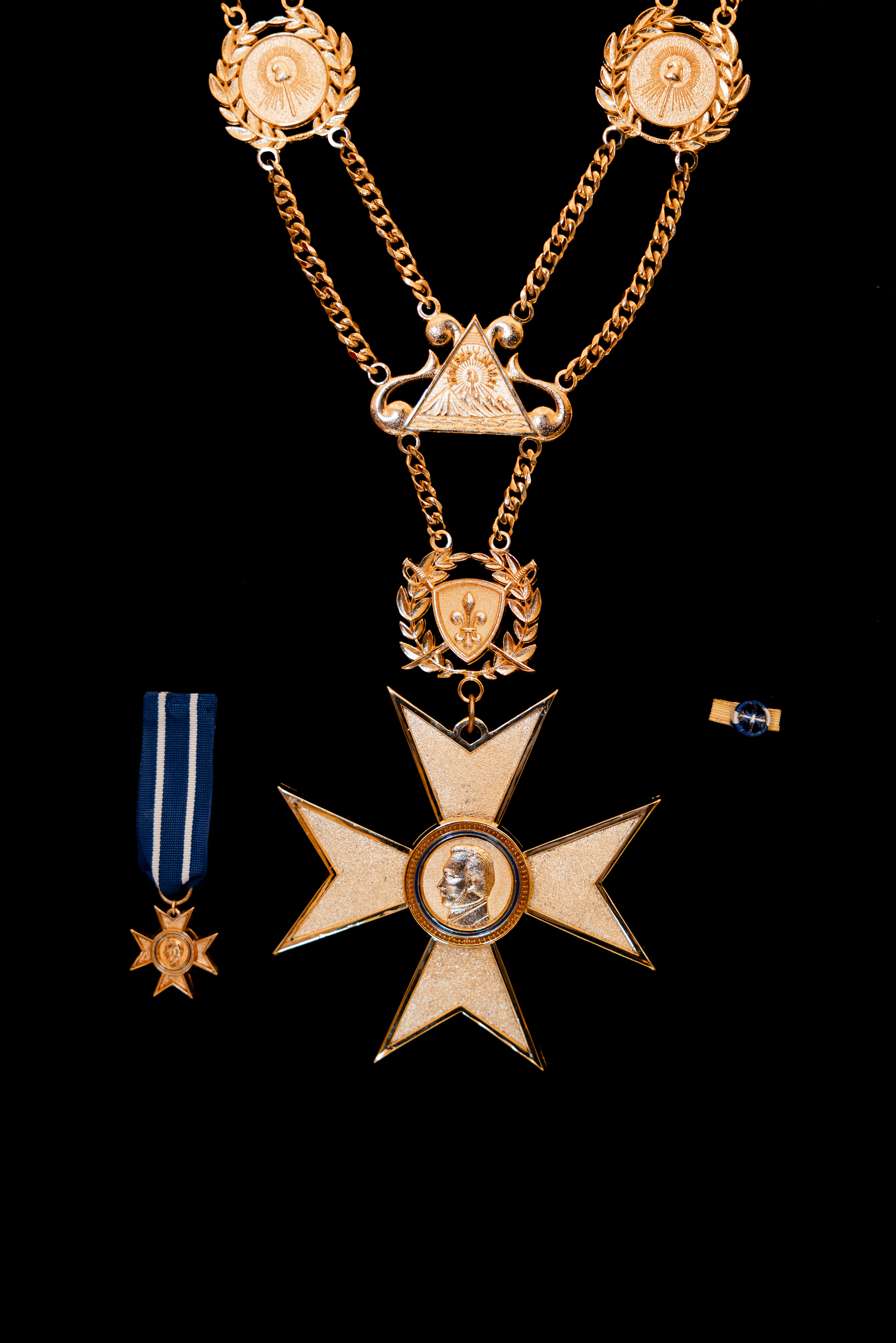
- The order awarded to William H. Duncan

Awarded by El Salvador
- Type: State order
- Established: 13 January 2021
- Country: El Salvador
- Eligibility: Citizens and foreigners
- Criteria: Awarded for service to the Republic of El Salvador
- Status: Currently constituted
- Founder: Nayib Bukele
- Grand master: President (Nayib Bukele)

Statistics
- First induction: 18 January 2021
- Total inductees: 3 (as of 30 July 2025)

Precedence
- Next (higher): None, highest
- Next (lower): National Order of José Matías Delgado
- Ribbon bar

The Grand Order of Francisco Morazán (Spanish: Gran Orden de Francisco Morazán) is a state order of El Salvador. It is the country's highest state order. The order is named for 19th century Central American political leader General Francisco Morazán.

== Description ==
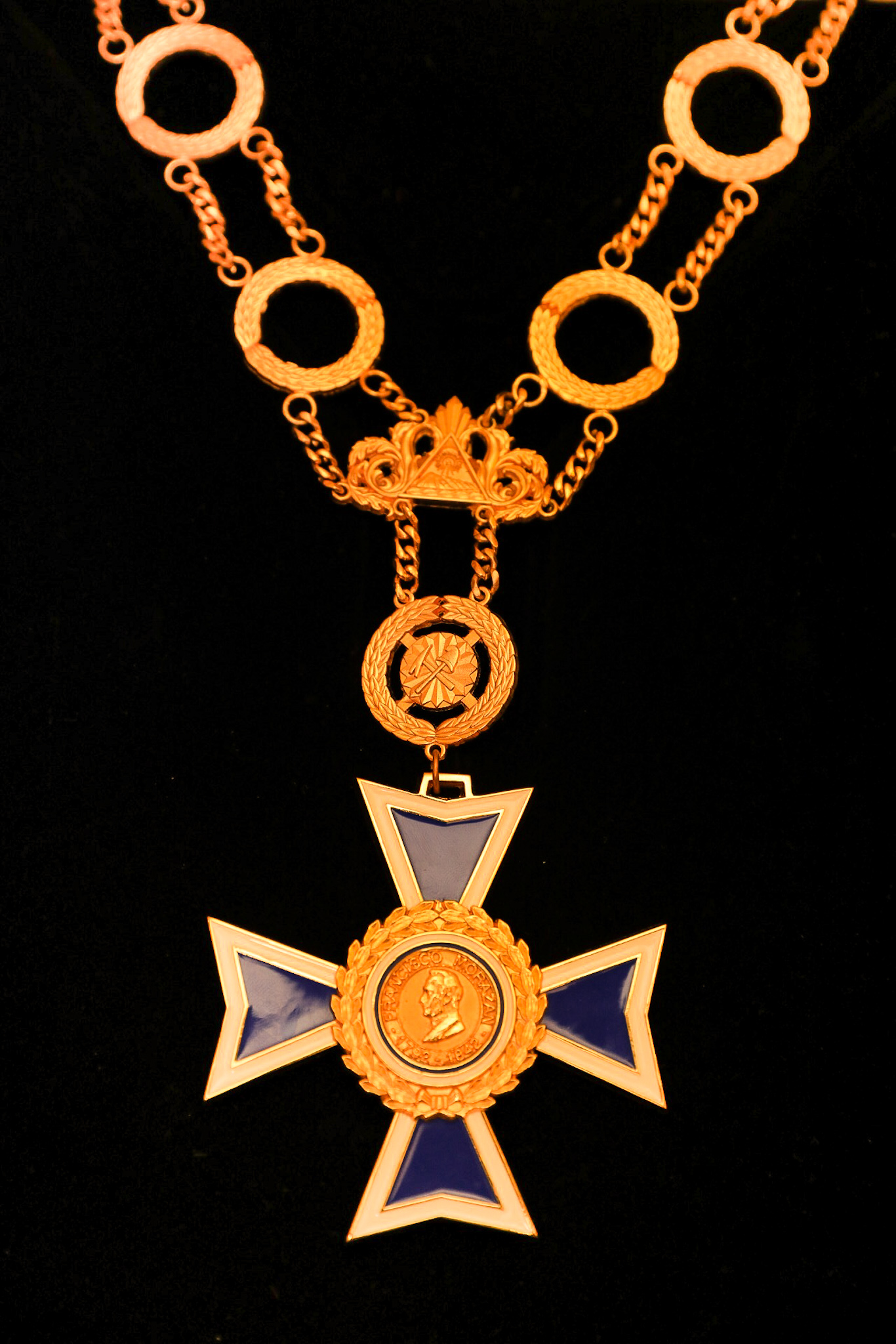
The order awarded to Ronald D. Johnson

According to the executive decree that established the Grand Order of Francisco Morazán, it can be awarded to anyone for service to the Republic of El Salvador or for possessing "civic, humanitarian, scientific, literary, [or] artistic virtues" ("virtudes cívicas, humanitarias, científicas, literarias, artísticas"). Salvadoran citizens and foreigners are eligible to receive the order. The president of El Salvador is the order's grand master and the president awards the order in a formal ceremony. The order is named after General Francisco Morazán, an important Central American political leader of the early 19th century.

The material the Grand Order of Francisco Morazán is made of has not been publicly disclosed. The order consists of a cross pattée with a profile effigy of Morazán in the center. It includes blue and white enamels, the primary colors on the flag of El Salvador.

== History ==
The Grand Order of Francisco Morazán was established as El Salvador's highest state order on 13 January 2021 by an execute decree issued by Salvadoran president Nayib Bukele. The grand order was first awarded on 18 January 2021 by Bukele to Ronald D. Johnson, the then-outgoing United States ambassador to El Salvador. Bukele initially created grand order to award it to Johnson.

== Notable recipients ==
As of 30 July 2025, the Grand Order of Francisco Morazán has been awarded three times.

- Ronald D. Johnson, United States ambassador to El Salvador (18 January 2021)
- Armed Forces of El Salvador (15 September 2024)
- William H. Duncan, United States ambassador to El Salvador (30 July 2025)

=== Gallery ===
Notable recipients of the Grand Order of Francisco Morazán
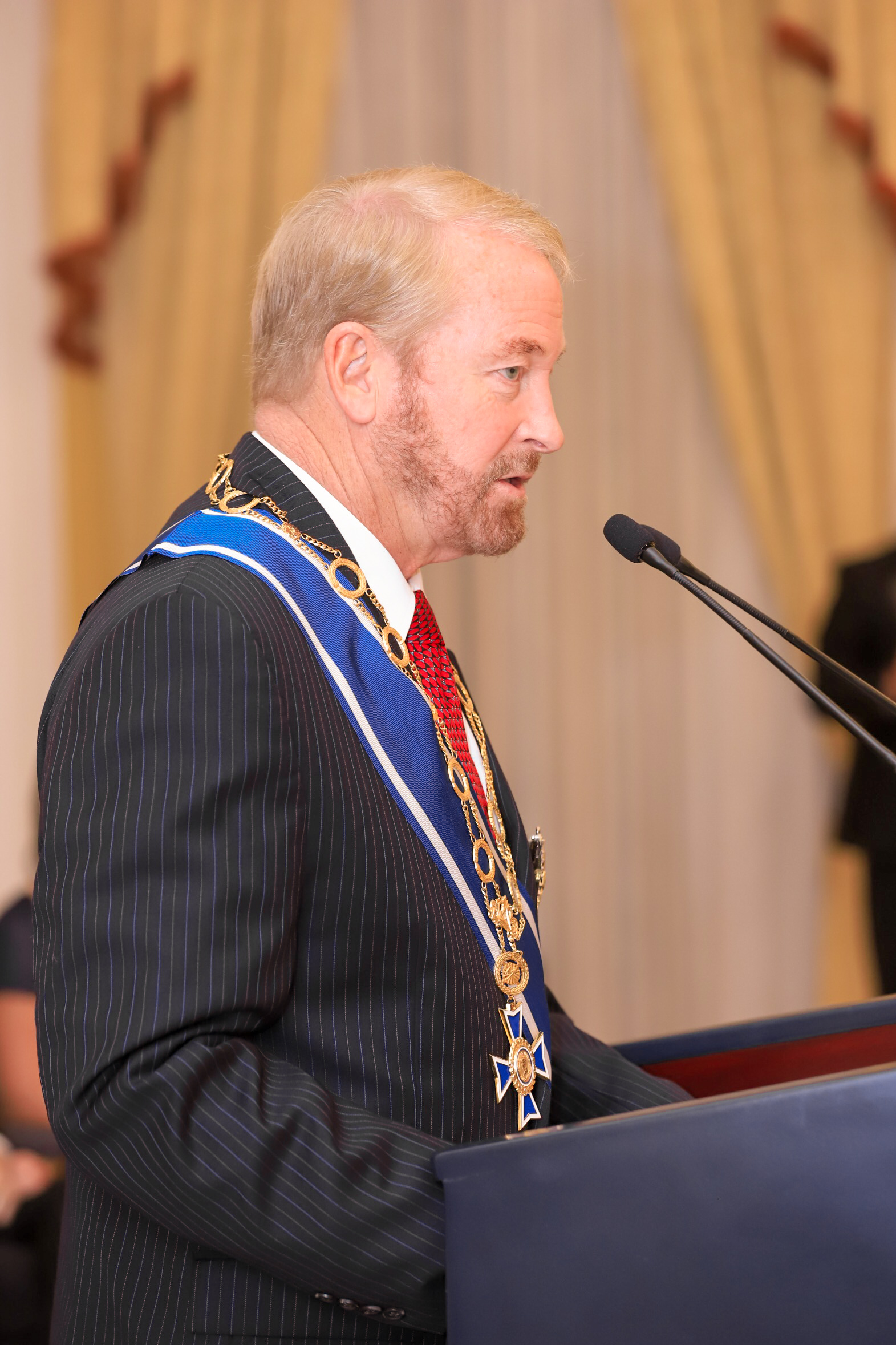
Ronald D. Johnson

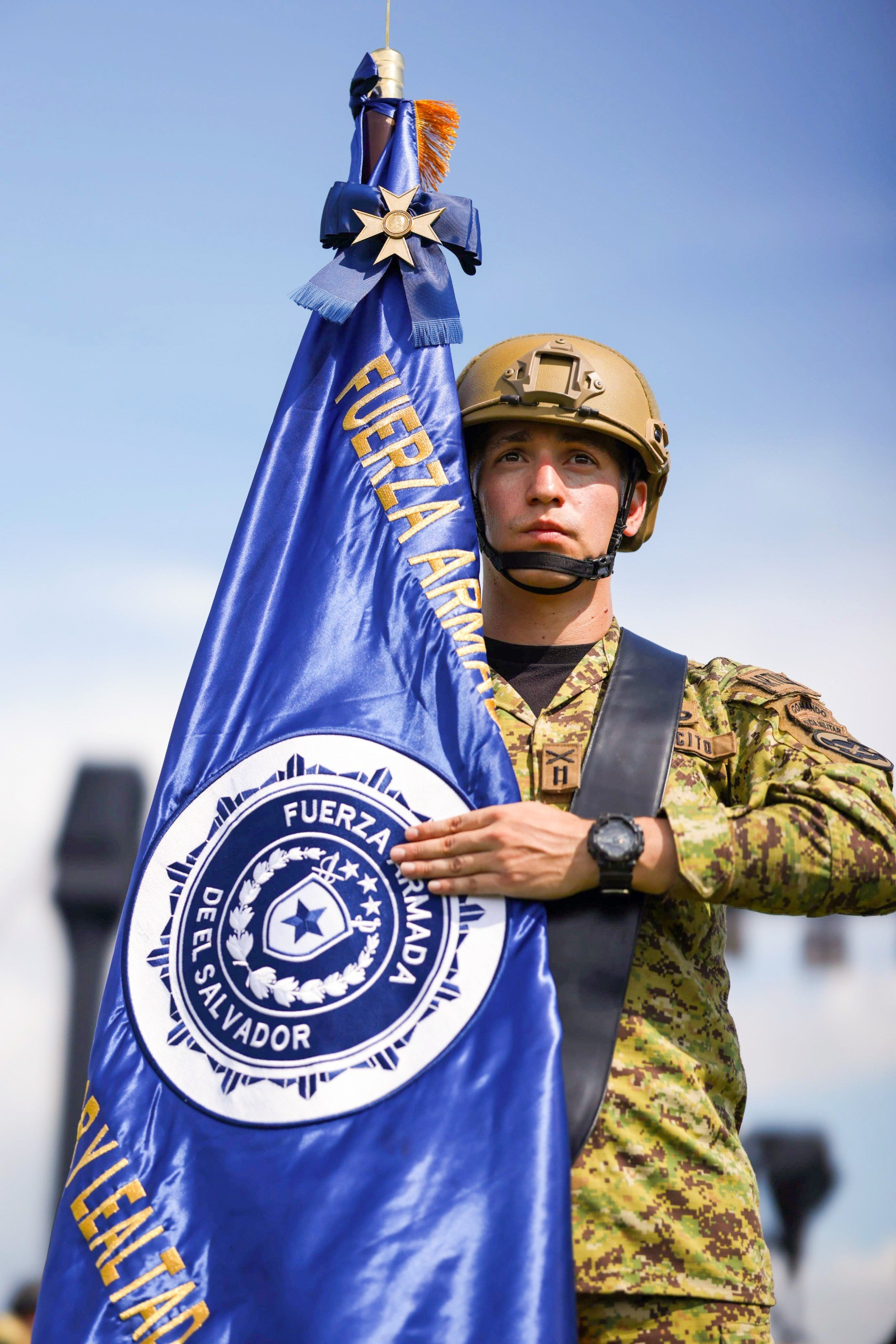
Armed Forces of El Salvador

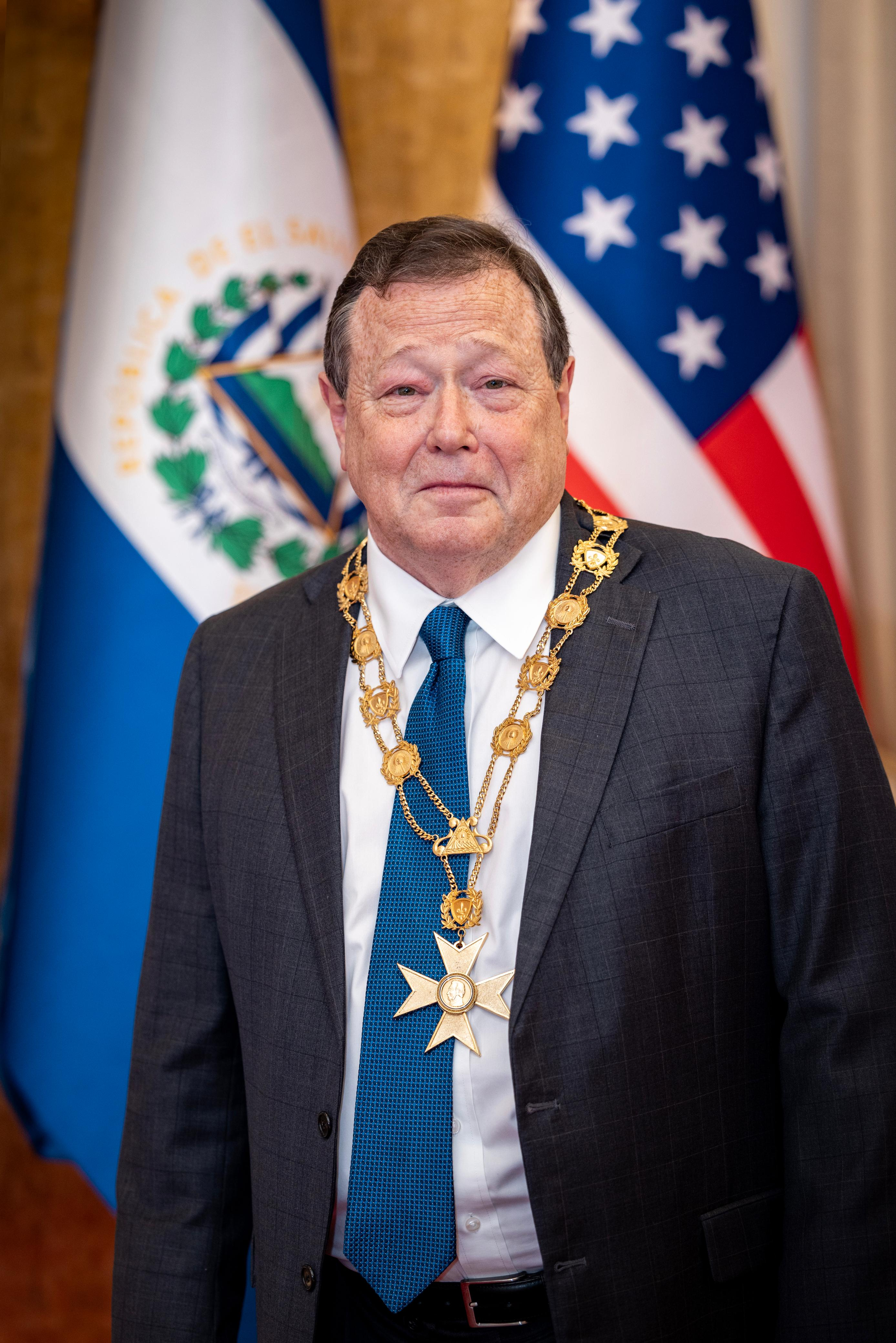
William H. Duncan

== See also ==
- List of highest civilian awards by country
