= Ronald D. Johnson =

American diplomat

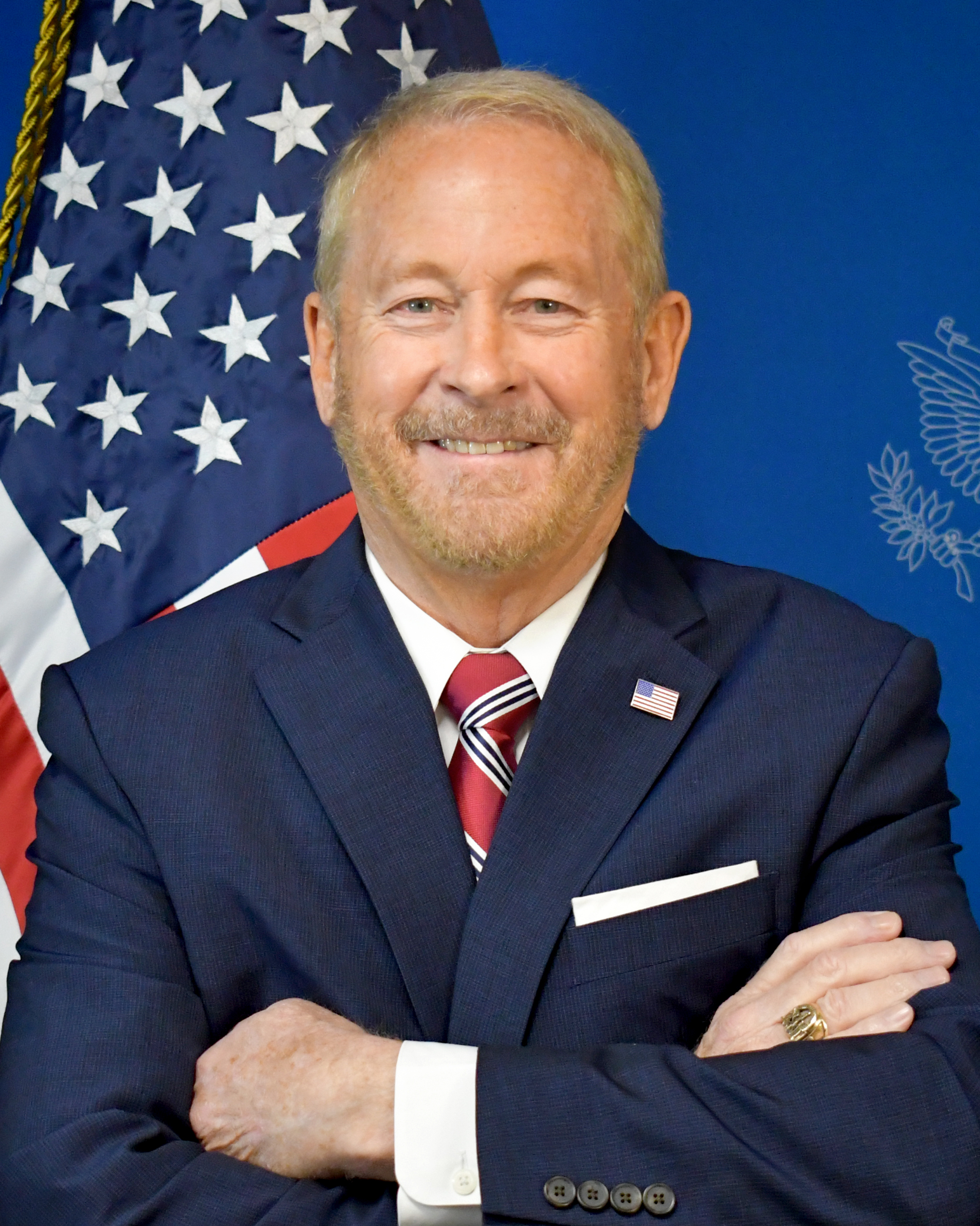
- Official portrait, 2025

United States Ambassador to Mexico
- Incumbent
- Assumed office May 19, 2025
- President: Donald Trump
- Preceded by: Ken Salazar

United States Ambassador to El Salvador
- In office September 6, 2019 – January 20, 2021
- President: Donald Trump
- Preceded by: Jean Elizabeth Manes
- Succeeded by: William H. Duncan

Personal details
- Born: Ronald Douglas Johnson
- Party: Republican
- Education: University of the State of New York (BS); National Intelligence University (MS)

Military service
- Allegiance: United States
- Branch/service: United States Army
- Years of service: 1971–1998
- Rank: Colonel
- Unit: Alabama Army National Guard

Ronald Douglas Johnson is an American diplomat who is serving as the United States ambassador to Mexico. Johnson served as the United States ambassador to El Salvador from 2019 to 2021. He was appointed ambassador by President Donald Trump on July 3, 2019. At the time of his appointment, he was serving as the Central Intelligence Agency’s Science and Technology Liaison to the U.S. Special Operations Command, based in Tampa, Florida. On December 10, 2024, Johnson was selected by Trump to serve as the United States Ambassador to Mexico during his second term.

== Early life ==
Johnson grew up in Alabama.

He has a Bachelor of Science from the University of the State of New York and a Master of Science from the National Intelligence University. From 1984 to 1998, he served in the U.S. Army and retired as a colonel. He led combat operations in El Salvador as an Army Green Beret during the 1980s, serving as one of 55 U.S. military advisers to the Salvador Army during the Salvadoran Civil War.

After leaving the Army in 1998, Johnson joined the CIA. He is fluent in Spanish.

== U.S. ambassador to El Salvador ==
During his time as U.S. ambassador to El Salvador, Johnson developed a close friendship with El Salvador president Nayib Bukele and shielded him from a corruption investigation by American and El Salvador investigators. Bukele made a request of Johnson that a U.S. embassy contractor, a U.S. citizen, who had provided information to investigators, be removed from El Salvador. Johnson complied with the request and dismissed the contractor. According to ProPublica, "The dismissal of the contractor was part of a pattern in which Johnson has been accused of shielding Bukele from U.S. and Salvadoran law enforcement."

After his tenure as U.S. ambassador to El Salvador, Johnson continued to support Bukele.

== U.S. ambassador to Mexico ==
On December 10, 2024, then President-elect Donald Trump announced his nomination of Johnson to serve as the United States ambassador to Mexico. On February 12, 2025, his nomination was sent to the Senate.

During his confirmation hearing before the Committee on March 13, 2025, Ronald Johnson did not rule out military action on Mexican soil against the cartels without notifying Mexican authorities if the life of an American citizen was at stake.

On April 2, 2025, his nomination was favorably reported out of committee by a 12–10 vote. On April 8, the U.S. Senate invoked cloture on his nomination by a 52–44 vote. On April 9, his nomination was confirmed by a 49–46 vote.

He arrived in Mexico on May 19, 2025 and presented his credentials to President Claudia Sheinbaum the same day.

=== Controversy over CIA operations in Mexico ===
In April 2026, a diplomatic dispute emerged between Mexico and the United States following reports that two Central Intelligence Agency (CIA) officers had died in a vehicle accident in Chihuahua, Mexico, while conducting an anti-drug operation without prior notification to the Mexican federal government.

Chihuahua Governor Maru Campos was accused by Mexican media and political sectors of allowing foreign agents to operate in her state without informing the Secretariat of Foreign Affairs. President Claudia Sheinbaum considered the incident a matter of national security and sovereignty, and sent a diplomatic note of protest to Ambassador Johnson demanding explanations regarding the officers' activities, their date of entry into Mexico, and their accreditation.

As a result, several sectors —including Morena senators, human rights collectives, and political analysts— formally requested Johnson's expulsion as ambassador and the initiation of impeachment proceedings against Governor Campos.

The Trump administration downplayed the incident and warned that Mexico must show greater cooperation in the fight against drug trafficking. Johnson faced his first high-profile diplomatic crisis since his appointment as ambassador.

== Awards and decorations ==
El Salvador

- Grand Order of Francisco Morazán (January 18, 2021)
- National Order of José Matías Delgado (January 18, 2021)

Diplomatic posts
Preceded by Jean Elizabeth Manes	United States Ambassador to El Salvador; 2019–2021	Succeeded by William H. Duncan
Preceded by Ken Salazar	United States Ambassador to Mexico; 2025–present	Incumbent
