= H. Douglas Barclay =

American politician and diplomat (1932–2021)

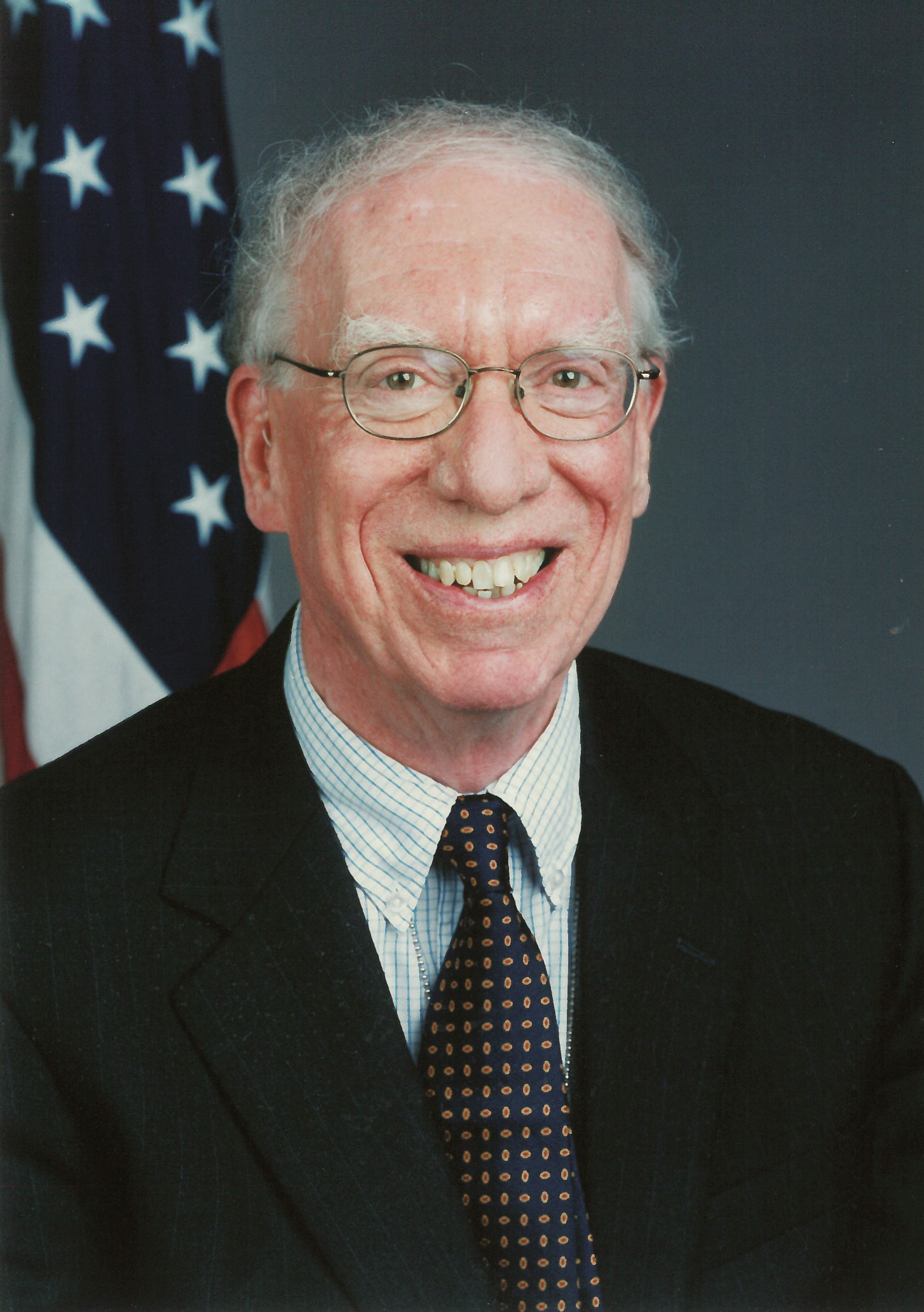

United States Ambassador to El Salvador
- In office December 13, 2003 – January 17, 2007
- President: George W. Bush
- Preceding: Rose M. Likins
- Succeeded by: Charles L. Glazer

Member of the New York Senate
- In office January 1, 1965 – December 31, 1984
- Preceding: Henry A. Wise
- Succeeded by: John M. McHugh
- Constituency: 43rd district (1965); 50th district (1966); 43rd district (1967-1972); 45th district (1973-1982); 46th district (1983-1984)

Personal details
- Born: Hugh Douglas Barclay; July 5, 1932 New York City, U.S.
- Died: March 14, 2021 (aged 88) Pulaski, New York, U.S.
- Party: Republican
- Spouse: Sara J. "Dee Dee" Seiter
- Children: 5, including Will Barclay
- Education: Yale College (BA); Syracuse University (JD)
- Occupation: Of counsel to Barclay Damon LLP

Hugh Douglas Barclay (July 5, 1932 – March 14, 2021) was an American politician, diplomat, and attorney from the state of New York. He was a member of the New York State Senate from 1965 to 1984. Barclay also served as the United States ambassador to El Salvador from 2003 to 2007.

== Early life and education ==
The son of Brig. Gen. Hugh Barclay and Dorothy Moody Barclay, Barclay was born on July 5, 1932 in New York City and moved to Pulaski, Oswego County, New York. He attended Pulaski Academy and Central Schools and later attended St. Paul's School. Barclay earned a B.A. from Yale University in 1955 and went on to serve in the United States Army for two years. He then received a J.D. from Syracuse University College of Law in 1961.

== Career ==
From 1961 until 2003, Barclay served as a partner at the upstate New York law firm of Hiscock & Barclay, a law firm specializing in banking and administrative law.

A Republican, Barclay was a member of the New York State Senate from 1965 to 1984, sitting in the 175th, 176th, 177th, 178th, 179th, 180th, 181st, 182nd, 183rd, 184th, and 185th New York State Legislatures. During this long tenure, he chaired the Senate Codes Committee, the Senate Judiciary Committee, the Select Task Force on Court Reorganization, and the Senate Republican (Majority) Conference. He was responsible for passing more than 500 pieces of legislation.

Between 1990 and 1993, Barclay was appointed a public board member of the Overseas Private Investment Corporation by President George H. W. Bush.

Barclay's appointment as Ambassador to El Salvador by George W. Bush was announced August 21, 2003, and the nomination was sent to the Senate for confirmation on September 15. The Senate confirmed the nomination on October 3. He was sworn in as ambassador on November 12, and presented his credentials to El Salvador's president, Francisco Flores, on December 18. He completed his tour as ambassador in January 2007.

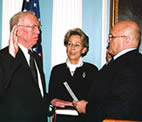
Being sworn in as ambassador by Deputy Sec. of State Richard Armitage as his wife Dee Dee looks on. November 12, 2003.

Barclay received the El Salvadorian National Congress award of the Nobel Amigo de El Salvador (2006), and the Republic of El Salvador award of the Order of José Matías Delgado in 2007.

== Community involvement ==
Barclay was an influential leader at Syracuse University. He served as an SU Trustee from 1979 until 2007, and was the chair of the board from 1992 to 1998. He was also a member of the College of Law Advisory Board. In 1984, he received the George Arents Award Pioneer Medal, Syracuse university's highest alumni honor, for Excellence in Law and Public Service. In 1985, the law library at the Syracuse University College of Law was named in his honor. He also received an honorary degree from SU in 1998.

Barclay received Clarkson University's Bertrand S. Snell Award (1987), the St. Lawrence University Distinguished Service Award (1985), and the SUNY Potsdam North Country Citation (1985).

== Personal life ==
Barclay was married to Sara J. "Dee Dee" Seiter for 61 years. The Barclays had five children, including Assemblyman William A. Barclay (born 1969).

Barclay died on March 14, 2021, at the age of 88.

== Sources ==
New York State Senate
Preceded by Henry A. Wise	New York State Senate; 43rd District; 1965	Succeeded by Lloyd A. Newcombe
Preceded by Bryce Barden	New York State Senate; 50th District; 1966	Succeeded by Thomas Laverne
Preceded by Lloyd A. Newcombe	New York State Senate; 43rd District; 1967–1972	Succeeded by Ronald B. Stafford
Preceded by John H. Hughes	New York State Senate; 45th District; 1973–1982	Succeeded by Ronald B. Stafford
Preceded by James H. Donovan	New York State Senate; 46th District; 1983–1984	Succeeded by John M. McHugh
Diplomatic posts
Preceded by Rose M. Likins	United States Ambassador to El Salvador; 2003–2006	Succeeded by Charles L. Glazer
