= Francisco Palmieri =

American diplomat

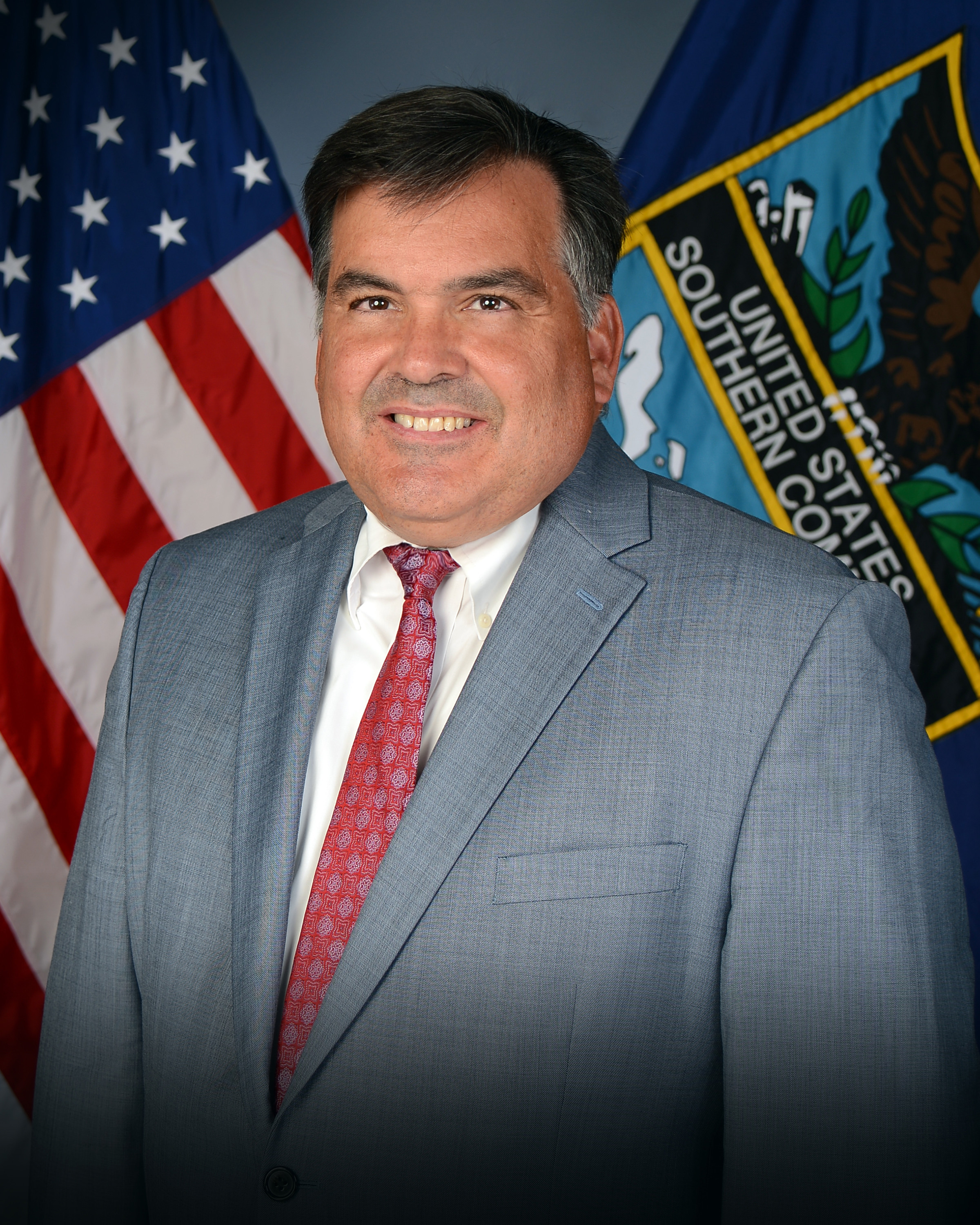
- Official portrait, 2021

U.S. Chargé d'Affaires to Colombia
- In office June 1, 2022 – January 20, 2025
- President: Joe Biden
- Preceded by: Philip S. Goldberg
- Succeeded by: Brendan O'Brien (Chargé d'affaires)

Assistant Secretary of State for Western Hemisphere Affairs
- Acting; January 20, 2017 – October 15, 2018
- President: Donald Trump
- Preceded by: Mari Carmen Aponte
- Succeeded by: Kimberly Breier

Francisco "Paco" Palmieri is an American diplomat who was the chargé d'affaires of the United States in Colombia, the acting United States ambassador to Colombia. He previously served as acting assistant secretary of state for Western Hemisphere affairs, leading the State Department’s efforts to advance U.S. foreign policy goals in the region from January 2017 to November 2018. Palmieri managed the successful 2018 Summit of the Americas in Peru, U.S. engagement with the Lima Group unifying 15 Western Hemisphere democracies in a multilateral diplomatic response to the crisis in Venezuela, the reorientation of U.S. foreign assistance in support of the Colombia peace process, the formulation and adoption of a new comprehensive U.S. political and economic Caribbean 2020 strategy, the launch of the renegotiation of the 50-year old Columbia River Treaty with Canada, and the multi-agency response to the ongoing migration challenges emanating from Central America. He also was responsible for the daily management of the bureau’s 53 overseas U.S. diplomatic missions, 12,000 employees, and implementation of the hemisphere’s $1.58 billion foreign assistance and $290 million operating budgets. He recently served as the civilian deputy and foreign policy advisor to Admiral Craig S. Faller at United States Southern Command, succeeding former ambassador Jean Elizabeth Manes in July 2021.

== Diplomatic career ==
Palmieri previously served as principal deputy assistant secretary of state for the Western Hemisphere from January 2016 to January 2017 and as deputy assistant secretary for Central America and the Caribbean from January 2014 to January 2016. In this role, he was the principal U.S. negotiator on the Alliance for Prosperity plan adopted by El Salvador, Guatemala, and Honduras. Palmieri also served as the director of the Bureau of Western Hemisphere Affairs’ Office of Policy Planning and Coordination in 2011–2012.

From 2012 to 2014, Palmieri served as deputy executive secretary in the Department of State’s executive secretariat, where he managed the flow of information to multiple secretaries of state and coordinated their overseas travel. He also served in the executive secretariat as deputy director of the staff support office (2000–2001), and as a senior watch officer (1999-2000) and watch officer (1990-1991) in the operations center. He directed and worked on the evacuation of more than 23 U.S. embassies due to war, terrorist attacks, internal political conflicts, and natural disasters through his crisis management response work in the executive secretariat.

He led the Bureau of International Narcotics and Law Enforcement’s (INL) Latin American and Caribbean Programs Office, where he was responsible for over $800 million in programs, including Plan Colombia and the Merida Initiative, 19 Narcotics Affairs offices throughout the Western Hemisphere, and more than 1,500 employees. He was the director of Embassy Baghdad’s INL Office from 2010-2011. In Iraq, he managed a $1 billion program with over 1,000 employees. He also served as director of the Near East and South and Central Asia Office in the Bureau of Democracy, Human Rights and Labor (DRL).

Overseas, Palmieri served as political counselor at the U.S. Embassy in Tegucigalpa, Honduras, from 2001 to 2005. He also served in San Salvador as the human rights officer at the end of El Salvador’s internal conflict (1988–1990), Santo Domingo as a vice consul, and Madrid as a political-military affairs officer.

In July 2018, President Donald Trump announced his intention to nominate Palmieri to be the next ambassador of the United States to Honduras. This nomination was reported favorably by the Senate Committee on Foreign Relations in September 2018, but was returned to the president at the close of the 115th Congress without consideration by the full Senate. In February 2019 it was reported that the Trump administration would discontinue its efforts to appoint Palmieri as ambassador to Honduras, in the face of opposition from Senator Marco Rubio, a proponent of a more hard-line approach to U.S. policy in Latin America.

In March 2019, Palmieri was appointed a senior diplomatic fellow for Latin American studies at the Wilson Center.

Palmieri appointed chargé d'affaires Colombia on June 1, 2022.

== Education ==
Palmieri earned an M.S. in international strategic studies from the National War College in June 2006. He received his A.B. in politics from Princeton University in 1983 and attended the University of Texas’s Lyndon B. Johnson School of Public Affairs from 1985-1986, where he studied under the Honorable Barbara Jordan.
