= Robert I. Blau =

American diplomat

United States Chargé d'affaires to El Salvador
- In office January 20, 2009 – September 22, 2010
- Preceded by: Charles L. Glazer
- Succeeded by: Mari Carmen Aponte

Personal details
- Born: 1955 (age 70–71)

Robert I. Blau (born 1955) is an American Career Foreign Service Officer who served as Chargé d'Affaires ad interim to El Salvador from January 2009 until September 2010.

There was an issue during his tenure about the United States interfering with El Salvador elections which Blau needed to be involved with.

In retirement, Robert Blau has written two books for publication: "Cancer World," describing his experiences battling throat and neck cancer; and "The Oldest City's Oldest Synagogue," a history of the Jewish community in St. Augustine, Florida.
