= Kevin Marino Cabrera =

American politician (born 1990)

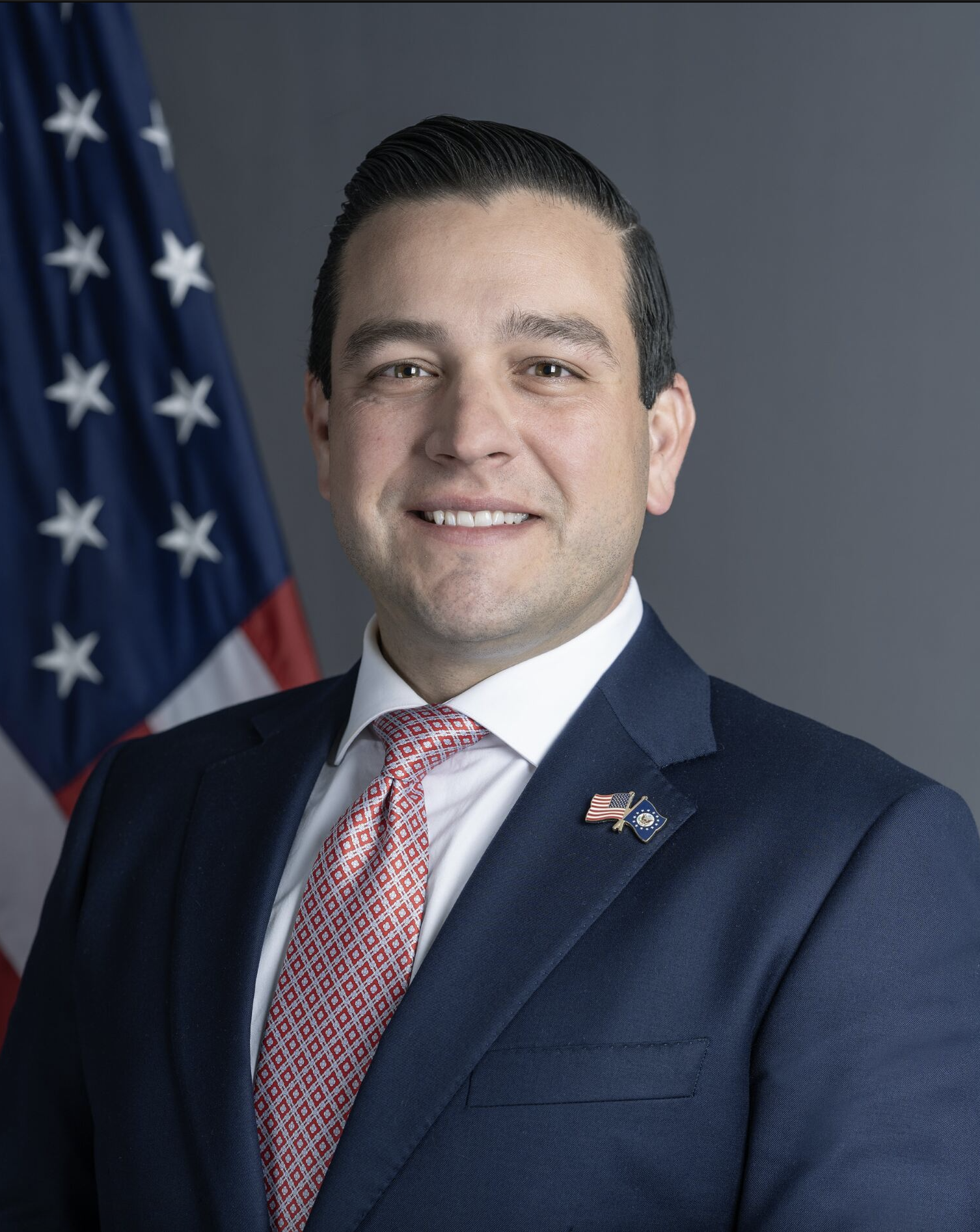
- Official portrait, 2025

United States Ambassador to Panama
- Incumbent
- Assumed office May 5, 2025
- President: Donald Trump
- Preceded by: Mari Carmen Aponte

Member of the Miami-Dade County Commission from the 6th district
- In office November 22, 2022 – April 9, 2025
- Preceded by: Jorge Fors
- Succeeded by: Natalie Milian Orbis

Personal details
- Born: September 3, 1990 (age 36) Miami, Florida, U.S.
- Party: Republican
- Education: Miami Dade College (AA); Florida International University (BA)

Kevin Marino Cabrera (born September 3, 1990) is an American politician from Florida who has served as the United States ambassador to Panama since 2025. He previously served as the commissioner of Miami-Dade County, Florida for District 6, from 2022 to 2025. He won the general election with 62% of the vote, beginning his term on November 22, 2022. During the election, Cabrera received the endorsement of Donald Trump.

== Early life and education ==
Kevin Marino Cabrera was born and raised in Miami, Florida. He is a second-generation Cuban American, which has significantly influenced his dedication to public service. Cabrera attended Florida International University, where he studied political science with a minor in International Relations, graduating cum laude. Cabrera is also an Honors graduate from Miami-Dade College, where he received an associate degree in Public Administration.

== Political career ==
Prior to serving as an elected official, Cabrera worked as Florida State Director for Donald Trump for President and the Republican National Committee, where he oversaw the campaign’s effort to win Florida’s 29 electoral votes.

In 2015, Cabrera was appointed councilman for West Kendall’s Community Council, a local land use and zoning board in Miami-Dade County. He was subsequently elected to a full term unopposed in 2016.

Cabrera began his political career as a field director for Carlos Curbelo’s 2014 congressional campaign. After Curbelo won office, Cabrera served as the director of constituent services in Curbelo's office in the United States House of Representatives.

=== Miami-Dade County Commissioner ===
Cabrera was elected as the Miami-Dade County Commissioner for District 6 in 2022. Representing parts of Miami, Hialeah, Coral Gables, Miami Springs, Virginia Gardens, West Miami, and unincorporated neighborhoods, he won the seat with the endorsement of Donald Trump, defeating former Coral Gables Commissioner Jorge Fors.

In November 2024, Cabrera sponsored a successful initiative to rename a four-mile stretch of road in Hialeah as "President Donald J. Trump Avenue".

Cabrera serves as the chairman of the Airport Committee, as well as the vice chair of both the International Trade Consortium and the Government Efficiency and Transparency Ad Hoc Committee. Additionally, he serves on the following committees: Infrastructure, Innovation and Technology Committee, Biscayne Bay Commission, and the Miami-Dade Biscayne Bay Watershed Management Advisory Board.

=== Republican party ===
In November 2023, Cabrera was elected as a Republican State Committeeman for Miami-Dade County with over 70% of the vote.

In 2024, Cabrera announced his candidacy for Vice Chair of the Republican Party of Florida (RPOF). His campaign received endorsements from prominent figures, including former president Donald Trump and Senator Marco Rubio.^{[21]}

Cabrera has served on the Republican National Committee (RNC) Platform Committee.

== Projects on the County Commission ==
Since his election to the Miami-Dade County Commission in 2022, Cabrera has introduced various initiatives and legislative measures. Such efforts include:

=== Miami International Airport ===
On July 23, 2024, Cabrera introduced a resolution directing Miami-Dade County's administration to inspect and upgrade critical infrastructure systems at Miami International Airport, including mechanical, plumbing, electrical, and IT components, to ensure the reliability of the county’s largest economic engine.

He has pushed for the expansion of MIA through a $9 billion dollar investment that includes new terminals and garages to accommodate increased traffic through the airport. The Central Concourse is set to be redeveloped alongside the expansion of Concourse D and the building of the brand new Flamingo Garage and Concourse K.

=== Transportation issues ===
Cabrera launched an initiative to expand access to the Golden Passport Program, improve traffic flow by synchronizing traffic lights, protect the Ludlam Trail, and promote seamless connectivity between Miami-Dade Transit, municipal trolleys, and rideshare services.

Traffic management

Cabrera advocated for the modernization of the county’s Advanced Traffic Management System (ATMS) to improve traffic flow, reduce congestion, and enhance public safety. The upgrades included replacing traffic signal software and installing updated equipment to allow for synchronized traffic lights.

Biscayne Bay

Cabrera led conservation efforts to improve water quality, reduce pollution, and protect marine life in Biscayne Bay. He also introduced measures to limit reckless boating speeds to help safeguard marine wildlife and promote safe water-based recreation.

=== Speed limit ===
Cabrera supported a resolution to lower the speed limit to 25 mph on all residential roads maintained by the county, as well as roads near parks and recreational centers.

== U.S. ambassador to Panama ==
On December 25, 2024, President-elect Donald Trump announced Cabrera as his choice for U.S. Ambassador to Panama. On February 12, 2025, his nomination was sent to the Senate. His nomination was confirmed by the Senate on April 9, 2025. He presented his credentials to President José Raúl Mulino on May 5, 2025.

Diplomatic posts
Preceded by Mari Carmen Aponte	United States Ambassador to Panama; 2025–present	Incumbent
