= Institut des Amériques =

The Institut des Amériques (IdA) is a public research institute in Paris, France. It is concerned with research dealing with Europe, Latin America and North America.

== Overview ==
The project was first suggested in 1998. Although some legwork was started in 2002, it was legally founded on March 5, 2005. On February 14, 2007, Gilles de Robien, who was then the French Minister of National Education, invited all ambassadors from each country of the Americas to touch-base with them. He inaugurated it in March 2007.

The IdA is affiliated to more than thirty research centres in France, including the Centre National de la Recherche Scientifique, the Muséum National d'Histoire Naturelle, REDIAL, the Institut d'Études Politiques de Paris, the École des hautes études en sciences sociales, the Institut de recherche pour le développement, the ESCP Europe, and the University of Provence Aix-Marseille I. Arturo Valenzuela is a board member.
