= Charles L. Glazer =

American diplomat

Charles Louis Glazer
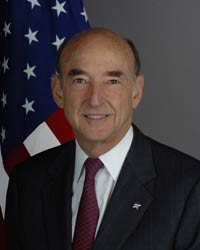

United States Ambassador to El Salvador
- In office January 16, 2007 – January 20, 2009
- President: George W. Bush
- Preceded by: H. Douglas Barclay
- Succeeded by: Mari Carmen Aponte

Personal details
- Born: June 21, 1943 (age 83)
- Education: University of Virginia

Charles Louis Glazer (born June 21, 1943) is a United States diplomat. He was sworn in as United States Ambassador to El Salvador on January 16, 2007. Mr. Glazer tendered his resignation, effective Tuesday, January 20, 2009, following an order by the incoming Obama administration requiring the departure of politically appointed ambassadors.

Prior to his ambassadorial appointment, Charles L. Glazer was president and chief executive officer of C. L. Glazer & Company, Inc., an institutional brokerage and investment banking firm in Greenwich, Connecticut, founded in 1981. Before establishing C. L. Glazer & Company, Inc., Glazer was a senior vice president and director of Jefferies & Company, an institutional brokerage firm in New York City, and served as senior vice president of Blyth Eastman Dillion & Co., Inc., an investment bank and institutional brokerage firm located in New York City.

Mr. Glazer served as an officer in the U.S. Army from 1965 to 1967 and was attached to the 502nd Military Intelligence Battalion while stationed in Seoul, Korea. Glazer received a BS in finance from the University of Virginia, where he became a brother of Zeta Beta Tau and is a former member of the university’s board of visitors, where he served on the executive committee and chaired the audit and compliance committee. Glazer also served on the board of the University of Virginia Investment Management Company.

Glazer, formerly the Republican National committeeman for Connecticut, served on the executive committee of the Republican National Committee and was the sergeant-at-arms at the 2004 Republican National Convention. President George W. Bush appointed Glazer as a public member of the board of trustees of the Woodrow Wilson International Center for Scholars in 2004.

Mr. Glazer served on the board of directors of the National Organization of Investment Professionals, in addition to serving on the board of directors of many civic and charitable organizations, including Arch Street, The Greenwich Teen Center, Connecticut, of which he was the founding chairman.

In 2018, President Trump indicated his intent to nominate Glazer as Member of the United States Advisory Commission on Public Diplomacy. On January 3, 2021, his nomination was returned to the President under Rule XXXI, Paragraph 6 of the United States Senate.

Diplomatic posts
| Preceded by Hugh D.Barclay | U.S. Ambassador to El Salvador; 2007–2009 | Succeeded by Mari Carmen Aponte |
