= Henry A. Wise (New York state senator) =

American politician (1906–1982)

Member of the New York State Senate from the 43rd district
- In office January 1, 1955 – December 31, 1964
- Preceded by: John H. Hughes
- Succeeded by: H. Douglas Barclay

Member of the New York State Senate from the 42nd district
- In office 1948 – December 31, 1954
- Preceded by: Isaac B. Mitchell
- Succeeded by: Fred J. Rath

Personal details
- Born: Henry Alexander Wise; August 21, 1906 Watertown, New York, U.S.
- Died: December 13, 1982 (aged 76)
- Party: Republican
- Spouse(s): Deborah Halsey Turnbull (m. 1935) Mary Alice Buck (m. 1941)
- Children: 3
- Education: Virginia Military Institute; University of Virginia
- Occupation: Politician, lawyer

Military service
- Allegiance: United States
- Branch/service: United States Army
- Battles/wars: World War II

Henry Alexander Wise (August 21, 1906 – December 13, 1982) was an American lawyer and politician from New York.

== Life ==
He was born on August 21, 1906, in Watertown, Jefferson County, New York, the son of Jennings Cropper Wise (1881–1968) and Elizabeth Lydecker (Anderson) Wise (1883–1963). He graduated from Virginia Military Institute with the Class of 1927, and in 1931 from the University of Virginia. In April 1935, he married Deborah Halsey Turnbull (1909–1943). In 1941, he married Mary Alice Buck (1918–1981), and they had three children. During World War II he served in the U.S. Army. He practiced law in Watertown.

== Political career ==
Wise was a member of the New York State Senate from 1948 to 1964, sitting in the 166th, 167th, 168th, 169th, 170th, 171st, 172nd, 173rd and 174th New York State Legislatures. He was a delegate to the 1952 Republican National Convention. In June 1964, he ran in the Republican primary for Congress in the 31st District, but was defeated by Robert C. McEwen.

== Return to Lexington and final years ==
Shortly after moving to live in Lexington, Virginia in 1966, Wise was elected historian of the VMI Alumni Association. This led to an initial research project on the Association itself, which gradually expanded into researching the entire history of the Virginia Military Institute. The result, Drawing Out the Man: The VMI Story, was published through the University of Virginia Press in 1978, with the foreword written by Harry F. Byrd Jr., who attended VMI from 1931 to 1933 before transferring to the University of Virginia.

He died on December 13, 1982; and was buried at the Wise family cemetery in Accomack County, Virginia.

== Personal life ==
Congressman from Virginia John Sergeant Wise (1846–1913) was his grandfather; and Governor of Virginia Henry A. Wise (1806–1876) and Congressman from New York Joseph H. Anderson (1800–1870) were his great-grandfathers.

New York State Senate
Preceded by Isaac B. Mitchell	New York State Senate; 42nd District; 1948–1954	Succeeded by Fred J. Rath
Preceded by John H. Hughes	New York State Senate; 43rd District; 1955–1964	Succeeded by Hugh Douglas Barclay
