= Rose M. Likins =

American diplomat

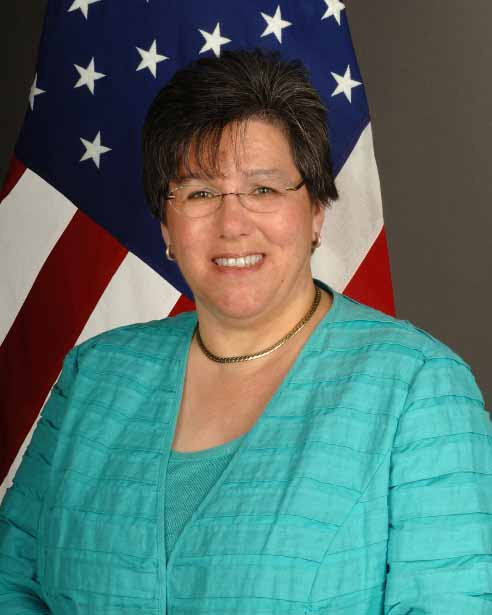

United States Ambassador to Peru
- In office September 15, 2010 – June 27, 2014
- President: Barack Obama
- Preceded by: P. Michael McKinley
- Succeeded by: Brian A. Nichols

United States Ambassador to El Salvador
- In office 2000–2003
- President: Bill Clinton
- Preceded by: Anne W. Patterson
- Succeeded by: H. Douglas Barclay

Personal details
- Born: 1959 (age 66–67) Virginia, U.S.
- Spouse: John
- Profession: Diplomat

Rose McCartney Likins (born 1959) is a retired Foreign Service Officer and the former United States Ambassador to Peru. Prior to this post she was the Deputy Director of the Foreign Service Institute in Washington, D.C., where she was also Dean of the Foreign Service Institute's School of Professional and Area Studies.

== Education and early career ==
Born Rose McCartney, Likins is the daughter of Eugene McCartney and Merlyn Houghland. A native of Virginia, Likins holds a BA in International Relations and Spanish from Mary Washington College where she graduated in 1981. She was a member of Phi Beta Kappa.

== Diplomatic career ==
Likins entered the foreign service in 1981 and her early positions included Special Assistant to the United States Deputy Secretary of State, Executive Assistant to the Under Secretary of State for Global Affairs; Director of the State Department's Operations Center; and Honduras desk officer. She was also a consular officer in the Consulate in Monterrey, Mexico.

Her later assignments included serving in the U.S. Embassy in Asuncion, Paraguay, Deputy Chief of Mission in Sofia, Bulgaria from 1995–1997, Deputy Executive Secretary of the State Department and United States Ambassador to El Salvador from August 2000 - June 2003 under Presidents Bill Clinton and George W. Bush.

From 2003 - 2006, Likins was Principal Deputy Assistant Secretary for Political-Military Affairs at the State Department and from 2006 - 2010, she was the Deputy Director of the Foreign Service Institute where she was also Dean of the Foreign Service Institute's School of Professional and Area Studies.

On April 21, 2010, President Barack Obama nominated Likins to be U.S. Ambassador to Peru and on August 10, 2010 the Senate confirmed her.

Diplomatic posts
Preceded by Anne W. Patterson	U.S. Ambassador to El Salvador; 2000 – 2003	Succeeded by H. Douglas Barclay
Preceded by P. Michael McKinley	U.S. Ambassador to Peru; 2010 – 2014	Succeeded by Brian A. Nichols
