= William H. Duncan =

American diplomat

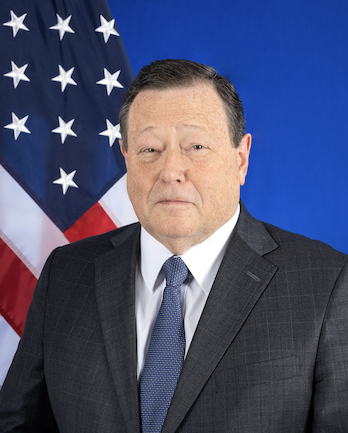
- Official portrait, 2023

United States Ambassador to El Salvador
- In office February 2, 2023 – July 31, 2025
- President: Joe Biden; Donald Trump
- Preceded by: Ronald D. Johnson
- Succeeded by: Elizabeth Hoffman Franolich (Acting)

Personal details
- Born: William Huie Duncan Louisiana, U.S.
- Education: University of Arkansas (BA, JD)

William Huie Duncan is an American former diplomat who served as the United States ambassador to El Salvador from 2023 to 2025.

== Early life and education ==
Born in Louisiana, Duncan grew up in Arkansas and received a Bachelor's degree and a Juris Doctor from the University of Arkansas. Before joining the Foreign Service in 1992, he served as a commissioned officer in the United States Navy and as an attorney with the U.S. Environmental Protection Agency.

== Career ==
Duncan is a career member of the Senior Foreign Service with the rank of Minister-Counselor; he has served a Foreign Service officer since 1992. During his career, he served as consul general in Monterrey, Mexico, in addition to serving as deputy chief of mission at U.S. Embassy Mexico City, Mexico. He has also served other missions in Asunción, Madrid, Baghdad, Mexico City, Bogotá, San Salvador, and Matamoros. His domestic assignments include the Offices of Andean Affairs, Mexican Affairs, East African Affairs, and Central American Affairs, as well as the State Department Operations Center.

=== United States ambassador to El Salvador ===
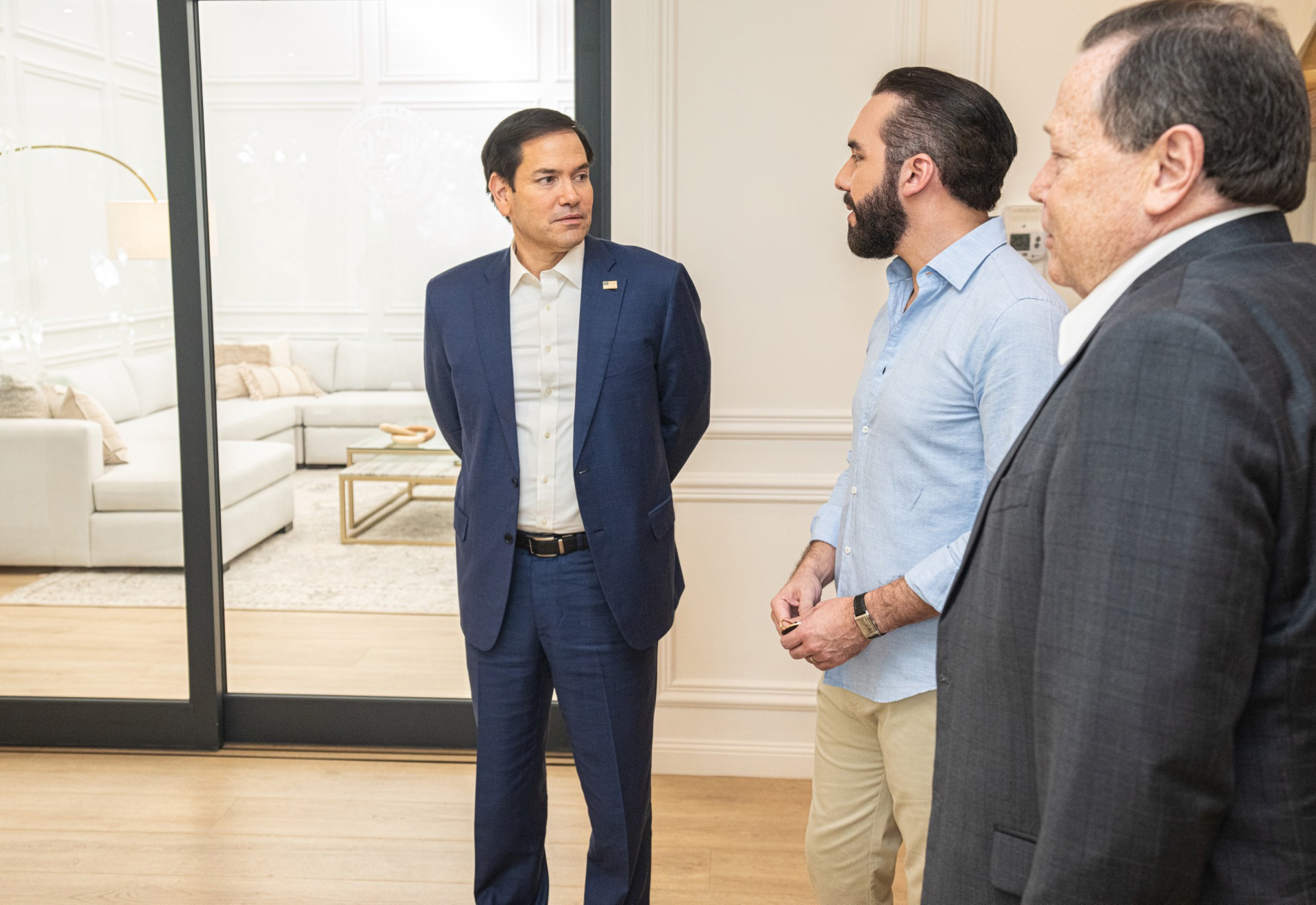
Duncan with Salvadoran president Nayib Bukele and U.S. Secretary of State Marco Rubio in 2025

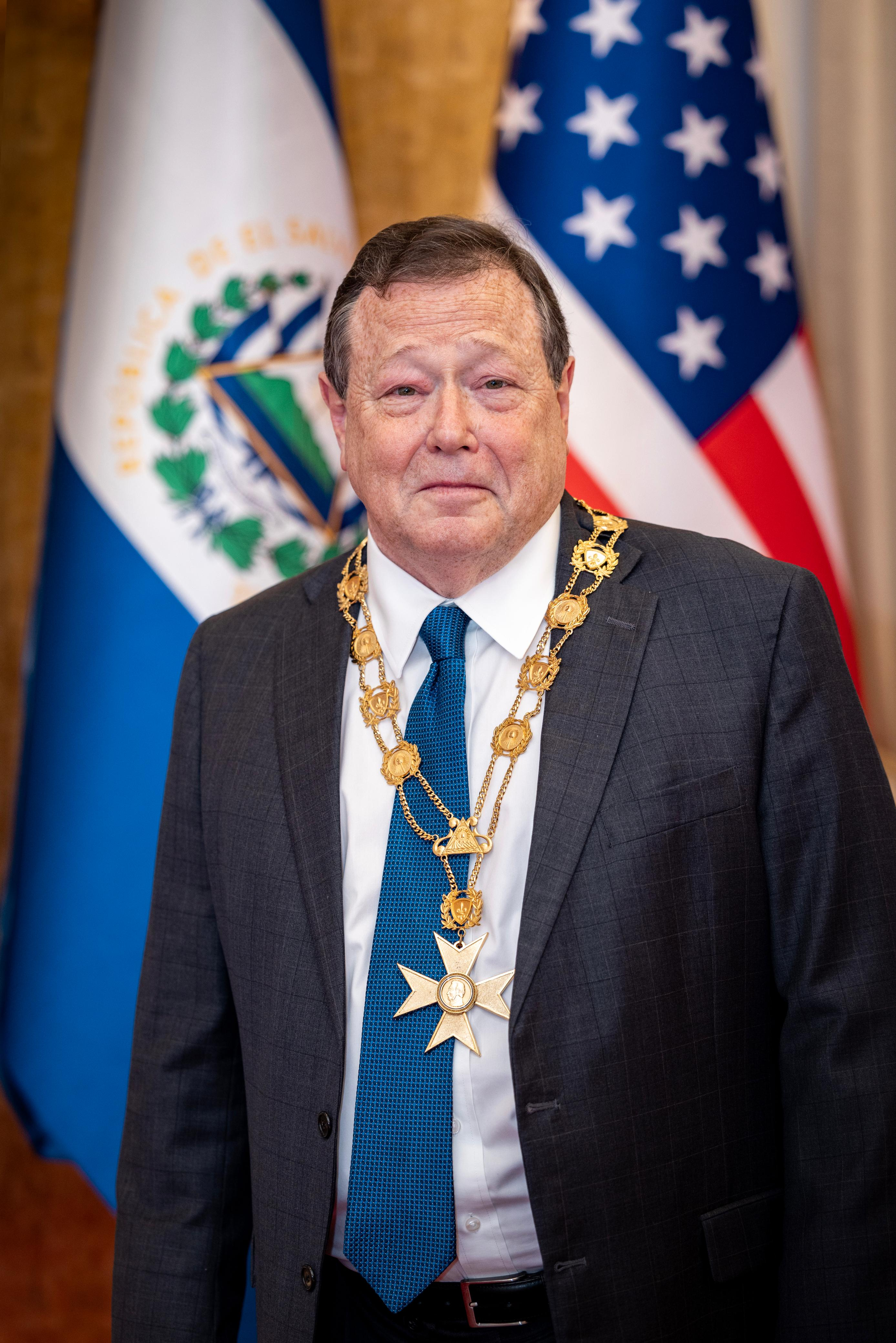
Duncan wearing the Grand Order of Francisco Morazán

On February 25, 2022, President Joe Biden nominated Duncan to be the next United States Ambassador to El Salvador. Hearings on his nomination were held before the Senate Foreign Relations Committee on July 28, 2022. His nomination was favorably reported by the committee on August 3, 2022. The United States Senate confirmed Duncan on December 13, 2022, by voice vote. He was sworn in by Assistant Secretary Brian A. Nichols on January 24, 2023, and he presented his credentials to President Nayib Bukele on February 2, 2023.

In July 2025, Duncan announced his retirement from diplomatic service. On July 30, 2025, Bukele awarded Duncan the Grand Order of Francisco Morazán, El Salvador's highest decoration. Duncan was succeeded by Elizabeth Hoffman in an interim capacity.

== Personal life ==
Duncan speaks Spanish. Duncan and his wife Nora have three daughters and two grandsons.

== See also ==
- Ambassadors of the United States
- List of ambassadors appointed by Joe Biden

Diplomatic posts
Preceded by Ronald D. Johnson	United States Ambassador to El Salvador; 2023–2025	Succeeded by Elizabeth Hoffman (interim)
