= Kimberly Breier =

American diplomat (born 1972)

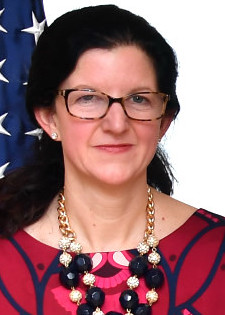

33rd Assistant Secretary of State for Western Hemisphere Affairs
- In office October 15, 2018 – August 30, 2019
- President: Donald Trump
- Preceded by: Roberta S. Jacobson
- Succeeded by: Brian A. Nichols

Personal details
- Born: September 12, 1972 (age 54) Marblehead, Massachusetts, U.S.
- Spouse: Peter Breier
- Children: Emma Breier
- Education: Georgetown University

Kimberly Breier (born September 12, 1972) is a former American diplomat. She served as Assistant Secretary of State for Western Hemisphere Affairs from October 15, 2018 until her resignation in August 2019.

== Early life ==
Breier was born in Marblehead, Massachusetts. She completed a bachelor's degree in Spanish at Middlebury College and a master's degree in Latin American studies at the School of Foreign Service of Georgetown University.

== Career ==
Between January 2005 and June 2006, she worked at the White House in the Western Hemisphere Affairs Office of the National Security Council, first as director for Brazil and the Southern Cone, and later as director for Mexico and Canada. She was also interim director for the Andean region.

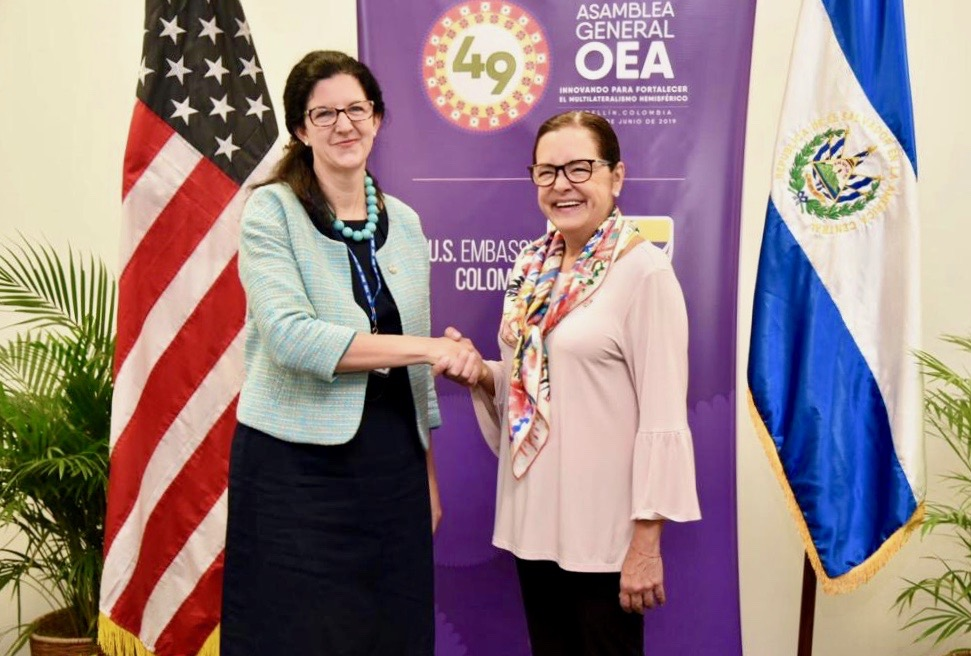
Breier meets with Salvadoran Foreign Minister Alexandra Hill in Medellín, Colombia on June 27, 2019.

Under the Trump administration, since 2017, she has been a member of the policymaking team for the Western Hemisphere of the United States Department of State. In March 2018, President Donald Trump nominated her as Assistant Secretary of State for Western Hemisphere Affairs, and was ratified by the United States Senate in October of that year. Breier replaced Francisco Palmieri, who was acting interim since the beginning of Trump's presidency in January 2017.

On January 30, 2019, Breier tweeted support for Canada, following their decision to reduce its embassy staff in Havana, Cuba, after a 14th Canadian diplomat reported symptoms of the mysterious Havana syndrome in late December 2018.

Breier resigned on August 8, 2019, officially for personal reasons. News reports cited her resignation due to internal disputes over immigration policies. She also fought with National Security Council official Mauricio Claver-Carone over the administration's Venezuela policy.

In February 2020 Breier joined Covington & Burling as a Senior Adviser.

== Personal life ==
Kimberly Breier is married to Peter Breier, a senior associate at Booz Allen Hamilton.
