= Rafael Barrientos (musician) =

Salvadoran musician

Rafael "Lito" Barrientos (1919 – 2 August 2008) was founder of the “Orquesta Internacional de Lito Barrientos”. He was born in Armenia, Sonsonate Department, El Salvador.

The Orchestra "Lito Barrientos" is known, among other songs, for one of the most famous cumbias of all time, “Cumbia en do menor".

In 2007 he was named "Hijo Meritísimo of San Salvador" ("Most meritorious son of El Salvador"). The orchestra received his award at an event in the park of Colonia Montserrat, his place of residence. Moreover, at this same time the park was renamed after him.

Other awards he received during his career were the "Congo de Oro", in Barranquilla, Colombia; "Ingenio 2006", National Center of Registries (CNR), and “The Order of José Matías Delgado”

He composed such songs as "Son guanaco" and ""Pájaro picón".
