= Mari Carmen Aponte =

American diplomat (born 1946)

Mari Aponte
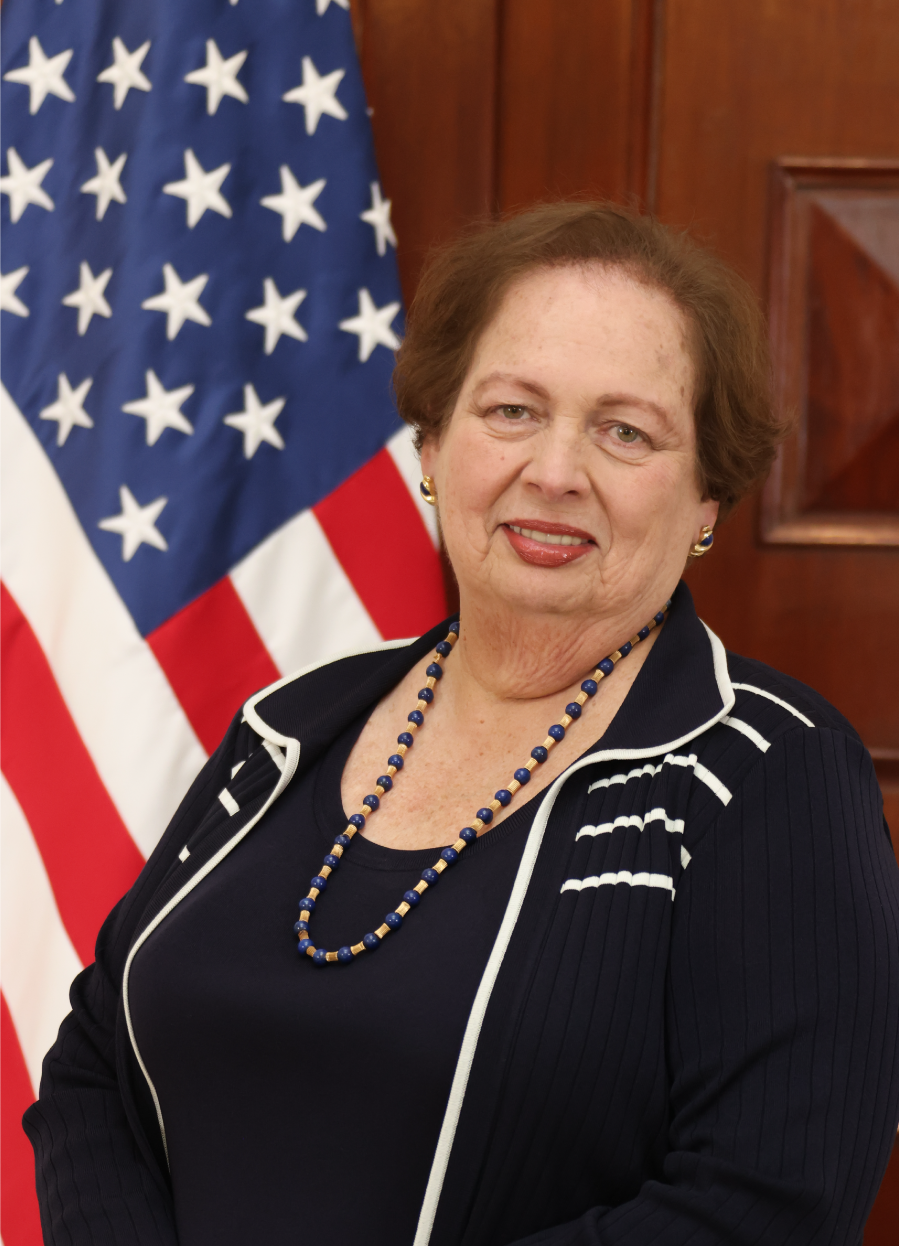
- Official portrait, 2022

United States Ambassador to Panama
- In office November 21, 2022 – January 20, 2025
- President: Joe Biden
- Preceded by: John D. Feeley (2018)
- Succeeded by: Kevin Marino Cabrera

Acting Assistant Secretary of State for Western Hemisphere Affairs
- In office May 5, 2016 – January 20, 2017
- President: Barack Obama
- Preceded by: Roberta S. Jacobson
- Succeeded by: Francisco Palmieri

United States Ambassador to El Salvador
- In office August 21, 2012 – February 7, 2016
- President: Barack Obama
- Preceded by: Sean Murphy (Acting)
- Succeeded by: Jean Elizabeth Manes
- In office September 27, 2010 – January 2, 2011
- President: Barack Obama
- Preceded by: Charles L. Glazer
- Succeeded by: Sean Murphy (Acting)

Director of the Puerto Rico Federal Affairs Administration
- In office 2001–2005
- Governor: Sila Calderón
- Preceded by: Xavier Romeu
- Succeeded by: Eduardo Bhatia

Personal details
- Born: 1946 (age 79–80) Santurce, Puerto Rico
- Party: Democratic
- Education: Rosemont College (BA); Villanova University (MA); Temple University Beasley School of Law (JD)

Mari Carmen Aponte (born 1946) is an American attorney and diplomat who served as the United States Ambassador to Panama in the Biden administration from 2022 to 2025. She previously served as acting assistant secretary of state for Western Hemisphere affairs on May 5, 2016. She also served as U.S. ambassador to El Salvador from August 2010 until December 2011 and again from June 14, 2012, until December 2015. Before that she was serving as a member of the board of directors of Oriental Group, a major financial and banking services enterprise in Puerto Rico. President Obama also nominated her as the United States' permanent representative to the Organization of American States, but the Senate had not acted upon that nomination upon adjournment in December 2014.

== Early life and education ==
Aponte was born in Puerto Rico in 1946. She obtained a Bachelor of Arts degree in Political Science from Rosemont College, a Master of Arts in theater from Villanova University, and a Juris Doctor from the Temple University Beasley School of Law, one of a few female law students enrolled under an affirmative action program, after serving a stint as a public school teacher.

== Career ==
In 1979, she was appointed a White House Fellow by President Jimmy Carter, serving as a special assistant to former Secretary of Housing and Urban Development Moon Landrieu.

=== Clinton administration ===
In 1998, President Bill Clinton nominated Aponte to serve as the United States' ambassador to the Dominican Republic. However, Aponte asked that her nomination be withdrawn from consideration by the Senate after her involvement with Roberto Tamayo was made public. After Aponte's nomination was withdrawn, Clinton designated Aponte a special assistant in the Office of Presidential Personnel.

=== Puerto Rico Federal Affairs Administration ===
In 2001, Puerto Rico Governor Sila Calderón appointed Aponte to be executive director of the Puerto Rico Federal Affairs Administration, a post she held until 2004.

=== Obama administration ===
Aponte was serving as a member of the District of Columbia Judicial Nomination Commission when President Obama nominated her in December 2009 to serve as the United States Ambassador to El Salvador. After the Senate failed to act upon her nomination over a period of eight months, Obama gave Aponte a recess appointment to the post in August 2010 and she stayed until 2011.

In 2011, Aponte helped organize and hosted President Obama's state visit to El Salvador as part of a Latin American tour that also included Brazil and Chile.

In August 2011, she personally hosted a visit from U.S. Supreme Court Justice Sonia Sotomayor, who was meeting with Salvadoran counterparts.

In December 2011, Senate Majority Leader Harry Reid filed for cloture on Aponte's nomination, in an effort to break Senate Republicans' filibuster of her nomination. However, the cloture vote failed by a vote of 49–37.

Aponte returned to the United States at the end of December 2011, when her recess appointment expired.

On June 14, 2012, the Senate confirmed Aponte to be the ambassador by voice vote. She presented her credentials on August 21, 2012, and served until February 7, 2016.

Aponte was also nominated by President Obama as a permanent representative to the OAS, but the Senate adjourned in December 2014 before taking up her nomination.

=== Biden administration ===
On October 8, 2021, President Joe Biden nominated Aponte to be the next U.S ambassador to Panama. The Senate Foreign Relations Committee did not act on it for the rest of the year, and it was returned to President Biden on January 3, 2022.

President Biden resent Aponte's nomination the next day. Hearings on her nomination were held before the Foreign Relations Committee on May 18, 2022. Her nomination was favorably reported on June 9, 2022. She was confirmed by the Senate on September 29, 2022. She presented her credentials to President Nito Cortizo on November 21, 2022.

=== Private sector ===
Aponte has served as a member of the Board of Directors of Oriental Group, a major financial and banking services enterprise in Puerto Rico, from 1998 to 2001 and from 2005 until appointed ambassador to El Salvador.

In addition to decades of law practice, she was a vice-chair of the National Alliance for Hispanic Health and a consultant to the Hispanic Information and Telecommunications Network (HITN).

She served as a director at the National Council of La Raza, the Puerto Rican Legal Defense and Education Fund, the University of the District of Columbia and Rosemont College. She presided over the Hispanic Bar Association of the District of Columbia. From 1983 to 1984 she served as the Hispanic National Bar Association’s first female president.

== Personal life ==
In the early 1990s, Aponte dated insurance salesman Roberto Tamayo. Tamayo was accused by a Cuban intelligence defector of spying for the Cuban government. Tamayo was alternately accused of being an FBI informant by a U.S. intelligence source. Aponte's relationship with Tamayo, which ended in 1994, was brought up by Republican Senator Jim DeMint as a reason to stop her confirmation as ambassador to El Salvador in 2011, however, she was confirmed as no "nefarious connection was found".

Aponte speaks Spanish and French.

== See also ==
- List of first women lawyers and judges in Pennsylvania

Diplomatic posts
Preceded by Robert Blau; Acting	United States Ambassador to El Salvador; 2010–2011	Succeeded by Sean Murphy; Acting
Preceded by Sean Murphy; Acting	United States Ambassador to El Salvador; 2012–2016	Succeeded by Michael Barkin; Acting
Preceded by Roberta Jacobson	Assistant Secretary of State for Western Hemisphere Affairs; Acting; 2016–2017	Succeeded by Francisco Palmieri
Preceded by Stewart Tuttle; Chargé d’Affaires ad interim	United States Ambassador to Panama; 2022–2025	Succeeded by Kevin Marino Cabrera
