= Roberta S. Jacobson =

American diplomat (born 1960)

Roberta Jacobson
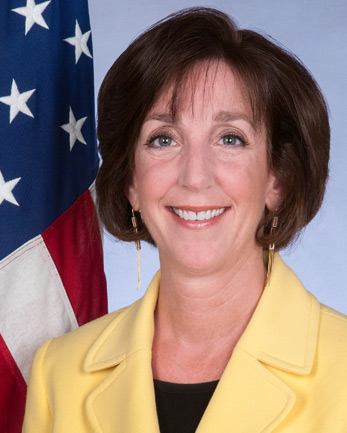

United States Ambassador to Mexico
- In office June 20, 2016 – May 5, 2018
- President: Barack Obama; Donald Trump
- Preceded by: Earl Anthony Wayne
- Succeeded by: Christopher Landau

32nd Assistant Secretary of State for Western Hemisphere Affairs
- In office July 31, 2011 – May 5, 2016; Acting: July 31, 2011 – March 30, 2012
- President: Barack Obama
- Preceded by: Arturo Valenzuela
- Succeeded by: Kimberly Breier

Personal details
- Born: Roberta Ann Steinfeld; April 14, 1960 (age 66) New York City, New York, U.S.
- Education: Brown University (BA); Tufts University (MA)

Roberta S. Jacobson (born April 14, 1960) is an American diplomat who was the United States Ambassador to Mexico from June 2016 to May 2018. She previously served as the Assistant Secretary of State for Western Hemisphere Affairs from March 30, 2012, to May 5, 2016. The United States Senate approved her nomination as U.S. Ambassador to Mexico on April 28, 2016. In March 2018, Jacobson announced her resignation effective May 5. Foreign Policy reported on January 18, 2021, that Jacobson would be in charge of Mexico–United States border affairs at the National Security Council under President Joe Biden.

== Early life and education ==
Born Roberta Ann Steinfeld, she was raised in Englewood Cliffs, New Jersey. Her father, Julian, was an electrical engineer who was the vice president of Mid-Island Electric Supply in Plainview, New York and her mother, Gloria, was a teacher and the supervisor of family and neighborhood counseling for the Bergen County Department of Health Services. Her parents were both active in the local community, with her mother serving on the board of education as its president and her father appointed to serve on the municipality's board of adjustment. She graduated from Dwight Morrow High School.

She earned her Bachelor of Arts degree at Brown University, then spent 1982 through 1984 at the United Nations Center for Social Development and Humanitarian Affairs. She earned her Master of Arts degree in law and diplomacy at Tufts University Fletcher School of Law and Diplomacy in 1986.

== Career ==
=== Early career ===
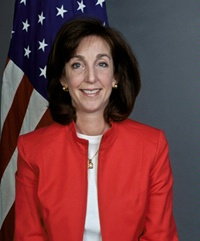
Official State Department portrait

In 1988, she worked at the United States National Security Council. The next year, she joined the Bureau of Western Hemisphere Affairs in the United States Department of State as special assistant to the assistant secretary of state for Western Hemisphere affairs, becoming executive assistant to the assistant secretary in 1992. She also served as coordinator for Cuban affairs. From 1996 to 2000, she was director of the Office of Policy Planning and Coordination at the Bureau of Western Hemisphere Affairs, covering issues such as civil-military relations, human rights, foreign assistance, and counter-narcotics throughout the hemisphere.

From 2000 to 2002, she was deputy chief of mission in the United States Embassy in Peru. The American Foreign Service Association, which represents the interests of career diplomats, objected to her appointment because the post is normally reserved for a foreign service officer and she was a civil service employee. Secretary of State Madeleine Albright overrode the recommendation of a State Department grievance board that recommended Jacobson be reassigned. The U.S. ambassador to Peru, John Hamilton, had chosen Jacobson over several career diplomats. He defended her selection in November 2000 saying: "She is the best manager I've come across in my 31 years in the Foreign Service".

Jacobson was director of the State Department's Office of Mexican Affairs from December 2002 to June 2007. At that point, she became deputy assistant secretary for Canada, Mexico and NAFTA issues in the Bureau. She was Principal Deputy Assistant Secretary for Western Hemisphere Affairs from December 2010 until July 2011, with responsibility for regional political and economic issues, management and personnel, and regional security issues.

=== Bureau of Western Hemisphere Affairs ===
When Arturo Valenzuela left the Bureau of Western Hemisphere Affairs, she became acting assistant secretary of state for Western Hemisphere affairs. U.S. President Barack Obama named her assistant secretary of state and she was sworn into office on March 30, 2012.

Jacobson led a U.S. delegation to Havana for historic talks with the government of Cuba in January 2015. According to advance media reports, she was expected to press Cuba to drop travel restrictions on American diplomats and propose that Cuba and the United States establish an embassy in Washington and Havana respectively.

=== U.S. Ambassador to Mexico ===
On November 10, 2015, the Senate Foreign Relations Committee approved Obama's nomination of Jacobson as the U.S. ambassador to Mexico by a vote of 12–7. Opposition to her appointment came primarily from the Republicans on the committee, notably presidential candidate Senator Marco Rubio. He and six other Republican senators, along with Democratic Senator Robert Menendez, raised concerns about her position on normalisation of relations between Cuba and the U.S., human rights issues, and the failed extradition of Joaquín "El Chapo" Guzmán, who had escaped Mexico's highest security prison in July 2015.

The United States Senate approved her appointment to be U.S. Ambassador to Mexico on April 28, 2016. She presented her credentials to Mexican President Enrique Peña Nieto on June 20, 2016. She also held the position of border czar, an informal position held previously by Alan Bersin.

On March 1, 2018, Jacobson filed her notice of resignation, effective May 5, 2018.

In November 2020, Jacobson was named a volunteer member of the Joe Biden presidential transition Agency Review Team to support transition efforts related to the United States Department of State.

=== Biden administration ===
After Joe Biden assumed office as president, Jacobson was selected in January 2021 to manage the administration's response to a growing number of migrants attempting to enter the country at the Mexico–United States border. Jacobson was scheduled to remain in her role for Biden's first 100 days in office, but announced her resignation on April 9, 2021. Jacobson now serves as Senior Advisor at Albright Stonebridge Group.

== Personal life ==
Jacobson is married to Jonathan Jacobson. They live with their two sons in Potomac, Maryland. She is Jewish.

== See also ==
- List of ambassadors of the United States
- Presidency of Donald Trump

Political offices
Preceded by Arturo Valenzuela	Assistant Secretary of State for Western Hemisphere Affairs; 2011–2016; Acting: 2011–2012	Succeeded by Mari Aponte; Acting
Diplomatic posts
Preceded by Earl Anthony Wayne	United States Ambassador to Mexico; 2016–2018	Succeeded by Christopher Landau
