= Arturo Valenzuela =

Chilean-American academic (born 1944)

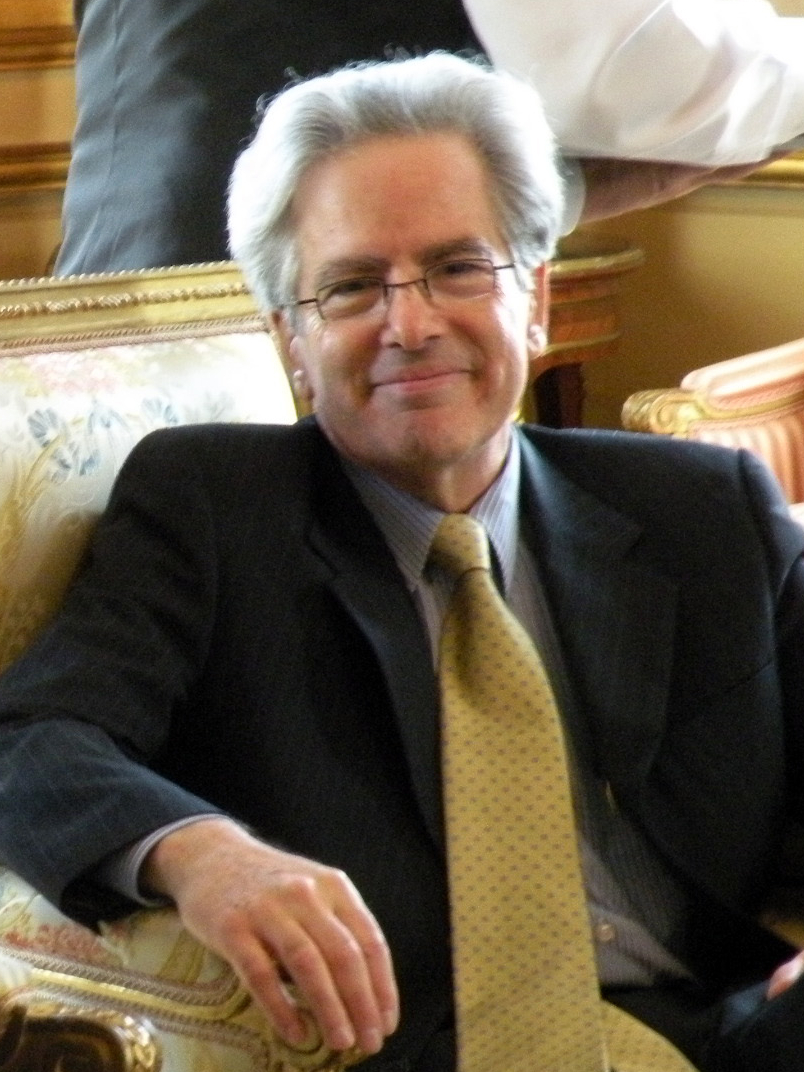

31st Assistant Secretary of State for Western Hemisphere Affairs
- In office November 10, 2009 – July 31, 2011
- President: Barack Obama
- Preceded by: Tom Shannon
- Succeeded by: Roberta S. Jacobson

Personal details
- Born: January 23, 1944 (age 82) Concepción, Chile
- Education: Drew University (BA); Columbia University (MA, PhD)

Arturo A. Valenzuela (born 23 January 1944) is a Chilean-American academic who was the United States Assistant Secretary of State for Western Hemisphere Affairs from November 5, 2009, until August 2011. His confirmation had been blocked by Senator Jim DeMint (R, SC) due to a dispute over President Barack Obama's approach to the 2009 Honduran constitutional crisis. He previously served as Professor of Government and Director of the Center for Latin American Studies in the Edmund A. Walsh School of Foreign Service at Georgetown University. He was previously Professor of Political Science and Director of the Council on Latin American Studies at Duke University. In May 2011 it was reported that Valenzuela would be leaving his government post later that summer to return to his academic activities. He officially left office at the end of August 2011.

== Early life ==
Valenzuela was born Arturo Arms Valenzuela Bowie in Concepción, Chile to American Methodist missionaries Raymond Arms Valenzuela and Dorothy Denell Bowie Marsh. He spent his childhood in Concepción where he attended primary school at the Lycée Charles de Gaulle, where he learned to speak French. In 1960, after his school was destroyed by the Great Chilean earthquake, he was sent by his family for a year to the United States. During the next eight years, he went back to visit his family in Chile only once. He earned a B.A. summa cum laude in Political Science and Religion from Drew University in 1965 and then obtained an M.A. (1967) and Doctorate (1971) in Political Science focusing on Comparative Politics from Columbia University. His doctoral thesis was entitled Clientelistic Politics in Chile: An Analysis of Center Local Linkages.

Valenzuela is married to Kathryn Mudge. He has two children from his first marriage.

== Political and academic career ==
In 1992 Valenzuela was appointed Deputy Assistant Secretary for Inter-American Affairs in the United States Department of State by President Bill Clinton. His primary responsibility there was United States foreign policy towards Mexico. In President Clinton's second term in office, he was appointed Special Assistant to the President and Senior Director for Inter-American Affairs at the National Security Council at the White House.

On May 12, 2009, Valenzuela was nominated by President Barack Obama as Assistant Secretary of State for Western Hemisphere Affairs. The nomination was confirmed by the Senate on November 5, 2009.

Valenzuela has been a visiting scholar at Oxford University, the University of Sussex, the University of Florence (Italy) and the Catholic University of Chile. He has served on the board of directors of Drew University, the National Democratic Institute for International Affairs (NDI), the National Council of La Raza (NCLR) and the advisory boards of Americas Watch and the Institut des Amériques in Paris. He is a member of the Council on Foreign Relations.

For his diplomatic contributions Valenzuela has been honored Brazil's Order of the Southern Cross and Colombia's Order of Boyaca.

== Bibliography ==
=== Books ===
- Political Brokers in Chile: Local Government in a Centralized Polity. Duke University Press, 1977. ISBN 0822303809
- The Breakdown of Democratic Regimes: Chile. Johns Hopkins University Press, 1978. ISBN 9780801820106
- (with Pamela Constable) A Nation of Enemies: Chile Under Pinochet. New York: Norton & Company, 1991.
- (ed. with Juan J. Linz) The Failure of Presidential Democracy: Comparative Perspectives. Johns Hopkins University Press, 1994.

=== Papers ===
- Valenzuela, Arturo. "Latin American Presidencies Interrupted" in Journal of Democracy Volume 15, Number 4 October 2004

Government offices
Preceded by Tom Shannon	Assistant Secretary of State for Western Hemisphere Affairs; 2009–2011	Succeeded by Roberta S. Jacobson
