= Pamela Constable =

American newspaper journalist

Pamela Groom Constable
- Education: Ethel Walker School; Greenwich Country Day School; Brown University
- Occupation: journalist
- Employer: The Washington Post
- Known for: Coverage of Afghanistan
- Spouse(s): Mark Ashida (m. 1981–div.); Arturo Arms Valenzuela (m. September 1986 – div.)

Pamela Constable is an American reporter and editor at The Washington Post. She has specialized in coverage of Afghanistan and Pakistan.

Constable attended Brown University. Her first paid job in journalism began in 1974 at The Capital in Annapolis, Maryland. In the 1980s she was a correspondent for The Baltimore Sun and then The Boston Globe, covering Latin American affairs.

Constable was The Washington Post's bureau chief in Afghanistan and Pakistan in 2019 and previously served as the Post's South Asia bureau chief between 1999 and 2005.

She is the author of two books about South Asia and the U.S. intervention there, Fragments of Grace: My Search for Meaning in the Strife of South Asia (2004) and Playing with Fire: Pakistan at War with Itself (2011), as well as the 1991 political history A Nation of Enemies: Chile Under Pinochet with Arturo Valenzuela.

== Personal life ==
Constable has practiced animal rescue on her foreign assignments, including a donkey and several dogs. Her father-in-law was the bishop of the Methodist Church of Chile.
