= List of ambassadors of the United States to El Salvador =

Ambassador of the United States to El Salvador
- Seal of the United States Department of State

- Flag of a United States ambassador

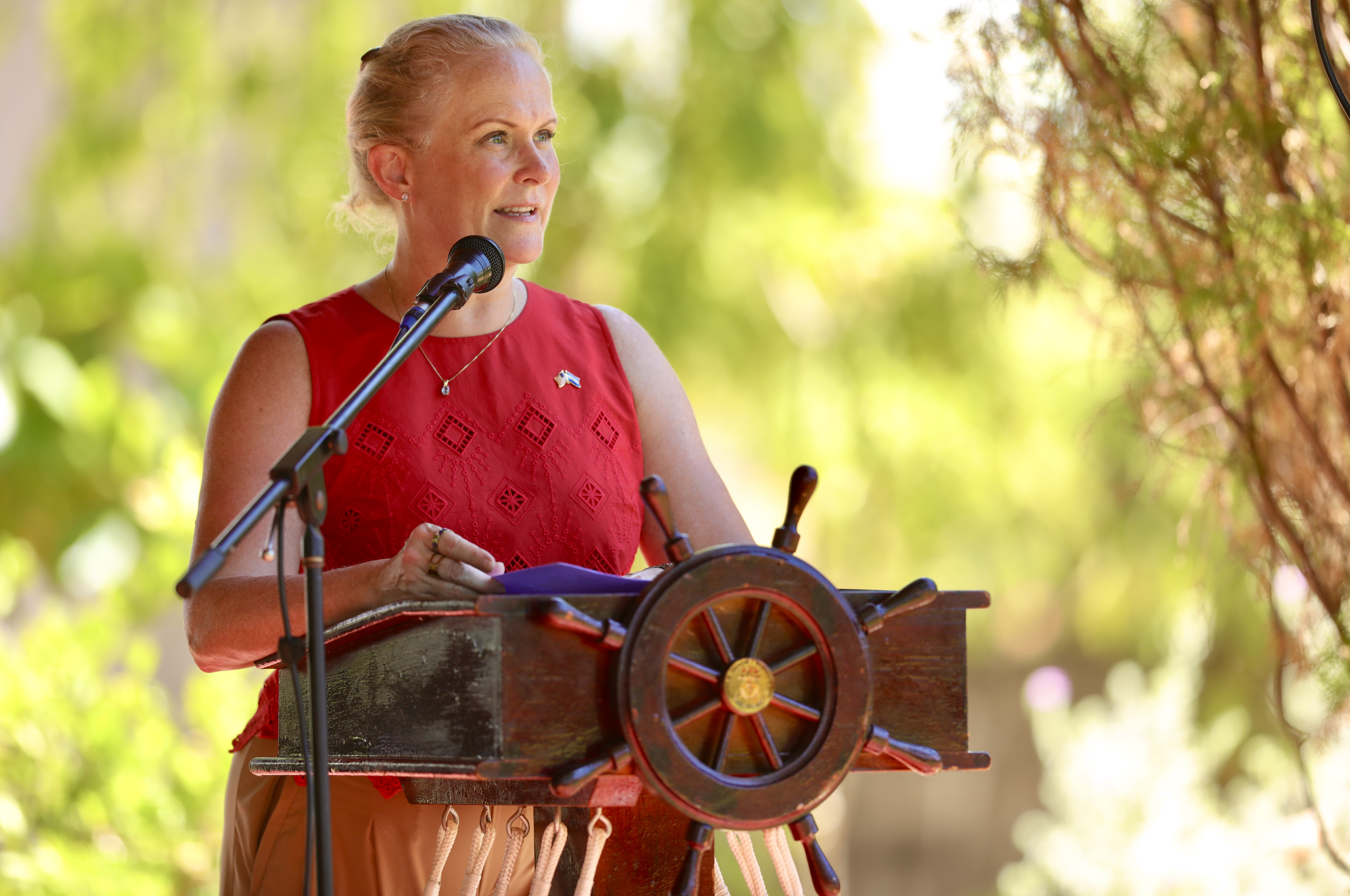
- Incumbent; Naomi Fellows; Chargé d'affaires ad interim since August 14, 2025
- Nominator: The president of the United States
- Appointer: The president with Senate advice and consent
- Inaugural holder: James R. Partridge as Minister Resident
- Formation: June 15, 1863
- Website: sv.usembassy.gov

The following is a list of United States ambassadors, or other chiefs of mission, to El Salvador. The title given by the United States State Department to this position is currently Ambassador Extraordinary and Minister Plenipotentiary.

== Chiefs of mission ==
Representative	Title	Presentation of credentials	Termination of mission	Appointed by
James R. Partridge	Minister Resident	June 15, 1863	March 22, 1866	Abraham Lincoln
Alpheus Starkey Williams	Minister Resident	January 21, 1867	October 27, 1869	Andrew Johnson
Alfred T. A. Torbert	Minister Resident	October 27, 1869	May 10, 1871	Ulysses S. Grant
Thomas Biddle	Minister Resident	December 5, 1871	June 30, 1873	Ulysses S. Grant
George Williamson	Minister Resident	October 18, 1873	before July 7, 1879	Ulysses S. Grant
Cornelius A. Logan	Minister Resident	July 7, 1879	on or soon after April 15, 1882	Rutherford B. Hayes
Henry C. Hall	Minister Resident	August 7, 1882	May 2, 1883	Chester A. Arthur
Henry C. Hall	Envoy Extraordinary and Minister Plenipotentiary	May 2, 1883	on or shortly before May 16, 1889	Chester A. Arthur
Lansing B. Mizner	Envoy Extraordinary and Minister Plenipotentiary	April 7–April 12, 1890	December 31, 1890	Benjamin Harrison
Romualdo Pacheco	Envoy Extraordinary and Minister Plenipotentiary	March 28, 1891	November 14, 1891	Benjamin Harrison
Richard Cutts Shannon	Envoy Extraordinary and Minister Plenipotentiary	November 14, 1891	April 30, 1893	Benjamin Harrison
Lewis Baker	Envoy Extraordinary and Minister Plenipotentiary	May 20, 1893	December 9, 1897	Grover Cleveland
William L. Merry	Envoy Extraordinary and Minister Plenipotentiary	April 3, 1899	December 31, 1907	William McKinley
Henry Percival Dodge	Envoy Extraordinary and Minister Plenipotentiary	July 1, 1908	February 6, 1909	Theodore Roosevelt
William Heimke	Envoy Extraordinary and Minister Plenipotentiary	October 18, 1909	March 16, 1914	William Howard Taft
Boaz W. Long	Envoy Extraordinary and Minister Plenipotentiary	October 14, 1914	November 7, 1917	Woodrow Wilson
Frank D. Arnold	Chargé d'Affaires ad interim	July 1918	February 10, 1921	Woodrow Wilson
Peter Augustus Jay	Envoy Extraordinary and Minister Plenipotentiary	February 10, 1921	April 28, 1921	Woodrow Wilson
Montgomery Schuyler, Jr.	Envoy Extraordinary and Minister Plenipotentiary	July 12, 1921	April 22, 1925	Warren G. Harding
Jefferson Caffery	Envoy Extraordinary and Minister Plenipotentiary	July 20, 1926	July 22, 1928	Calvin Coolidge
Warren D. Robbins	Envoy Extraordinary and Minister Plenipotentiary	February 27, 1929	April 30, 1931	Herbert Hoover
Charles B. Curtis	Envoy Extraordinary and Minister Plenipotentiary	November 6, 1931	January 10, 1932	Herbert Hoover
Frank P. Corrigan	Envoy Extraordinary and Minister Plenipotentiary	April 30, 1934	August 28, 1937	Franklin D. Roosevelt
Robert Frazer	Envoy Extraordinary and Minister Plenipotentiary	December 6, 1937	October 31, 1942	Franklin D. Roosevelt
Walter C. Thurston	Envoy Extraordinary and Minister Plenipotentiary	January 14, 1943	April 16, 1943	Franklin D. Roosevelt
Walter C. Thurston	Ambassador Extraordinary and Minister Plenipotentiary	April 16, 1943	October 14, 1944	Franklin D. Roosevelt
John F. Simmons	Ambassador Extraordinary and Minister Plenipotentiary	February 21, 1945	July 1, 1947	Franklin D. Roosevelt
Albert F. Nufer	Ambassador Extraordinary and Minister Plenipotentiary	August 13, 1947	July 16, 1949	Harry S. Truman
George P. Shaw	Ambassador Extraordinary and Minister Plenipotentiary	August 23, 1949	April 25, 1952	Harry S. Truman
Angier Biddle Duke	Ambassador Extraordinary and Minister Plenipotentiary	June 5, 1952	May 21, 1953	Dwight D. Eisenhower
Michael J. McDermott	Ambassador Extraordinary and Minister Plenipotentiary	June 25, 1953	September 28, 1954	Dwight D. Eisenhower
Robert C. Hill	Ambassador Extraordinary and Minister Plenipotentiary	November 4, 1954	September 21, 1955	Dwight D. Eisenhower
Thomas C. Mann	Ambassador Extraordinary and Minister Plenipotentiary	November 24, 1955	September 24, 1957	Dwight D. Eisenhower
Thorsten V. Kalijarvi	Ambassador Extraordinary and Minister Plenipotentiary	December 6, 1957	December 18, 1960	Dwight D. Eisenhower
Murat W. Williams	Ambassador Extraordinary and Minister Plenipotentiary	February 21, 1961	July 4, 1964	John F. Kennedy
Raúl H. Castro	Ambassador Extraordinary and Minister Plenipotentiary	December 11, 1964	July 17, 1968	Lyndon B. Johnson
William G. Bowdler	Ambassador Extraordinary and Minister Plenipotentiary	November 15, 1968	September 2, 1971	Richard Nixon
Henry E. Catto, Jr.	Ambassador Extraordinary and Minister Plenipotentiary	October 21, 1971	September 2, 1973	Richard Nixon
James F. Campbell	Ambassador Extraordinary and Minister Plenipotentiary	April 5, 1974	July 23, 1976	Richard Nixon
Ignacio E. Lozano, Jr.	Ambassador Extraordinary and Minister Plenipotentiary	August 31, 1976	June 1, 1977	Gerald Ford
Frank J. Devine	Ambassador Extraordinary and Minister Plenipotentiary	November 1, 1977	February 15, 1980	Jimmy Carter
Robert E. White	Ambassador Extraordinary and Minister Plenipotentiary	March 11, 1980	February 1, 1981	Jimmy Carter
Deane R. Hinton	Ambassador Extraordinary and Minister Plenipotentiary	May 28, 1981	July 15, 1983	Ronald Reagan
Thomas R. Pickering	Ambassador Extraordinary and Minister Plenipotentiary	September 5, 1983	June 7, 1985	Ronald Reagan
Edwin G. Corr	Ambassador Extraordinary and Minister Plenipotentiary	August 29, 1985	August 10, 1988	Ronald Reagan
William Graham Walker	Ambassador Extraordinary and Minister Plenipotentiary	August 30, 1988	February 21, 1992	Ronald Reagan
Peter F. Romero	Chargé d'Affaires ad interim	February 21, 1992	July 1992	George H. W. Bush
Gwen C. Clare	Chargé d'Affaires ad interim	July 1992	September 20, 1993	George H. W. Bush
Alan H. Flanigan	Ambassador Extraordinary and Minister Plenipotentiary	September 20, 1993	July 9, 1996	Bill Clinton
Anne W. Patterson	Ambassador Extraordinary and Minister Plenipotentiary	May 16, 1997	July 15, 2000	Bill Clinton
Rose M. Likins	Ambassador Extraordinary and Minister Plenipotentiary	August 23, 2000	June 16, 2003	Bill Clinton
Philip C. French	Chargé d'Affaires ad interim	June 13, 2003	December 13, 2003	George W. Bush
H. Douglas Barclay	Ambassador Extraordinary and Minister Plenipotentiary	December 13, 2003	July 23, 2006	George W. Bush
Charles L. Glazer	Ambassador Extraordinary and Minister Plenipotentiary	December 5, 2006	January 20, 2009	George W. Bush
Robert I. Blau	Chargé d'Affaires ad interim	January 20, 2009	September 22, 2010	Barack Obama
Mari Carmen Aponte	Ambassador Extraordinary and Minister Plenipotentiary	September 22, 2010	January 2, 2011	Barack Obama
Sean Murphy	Chargé d'Affaires ad interim	January 2, 2011	August 21, 2012,	Barack Obama
Mari Carmen Aponte	Ambassador Extraordinary and Minister Plenipotentiary	August 21, 2012	February 7, 2016	Barack Obama
Jean Elizabeth Manes	Ambassador Extraordinary and Minister Plenipotentiary	March 30, 2016	July 31, 2019	Barack Obama
Ronald D. Johnson	Ambassador Extraordinary and Minister Plenipotentiary	September 6, 2019	January 20, 2021	Donald Trump
Brendan O'Brien	Chargé d'Affaires ad interim	January 20, 2021	June 1, 2021	Joe Biden
Jean Elizabeth Manes	Chargé d'Affaires ad interim	June 1, 2021	November 22, 2021	Joe Biden
Brendan O'Brien	Chargé d'Affaires ad interim	November 22, 2021	June 3, 2022	Joe Biden
Patrick Ventrell	Chargé d'Affaires ad interim	June 3, 2022	June 27, 2022	Joe Biden
Matthew Rees	Chargé d'Affaires ad interim	June 27, 2022	August 11, 2022	Joe Biden
Katherine Dueholm	Chargé d'Affaires ad interim	August 11, 2022	February 2, 2023	Joe Biden
William H. Duncan	Ambassador Extraordinary and Minister Plenipotentiary	February 2, 2023	July 31, 2025	Joe Biden
Elizabeth Hoffman Franolich	Chargé d'Affaires ad interim	July 31, 2025	August 14, 2025	Donald Trump
Naomi Fellows	Chargé d'Affaires ad interim	August 14, 2025	Incumbent	Donald Trump

== See also ==
- El Salvador – United States relations
- Foreign relations of El Salvador
- Ambassadors of the United States
