= Jean Elizabeth Manes =

American diplomat (born 1970)

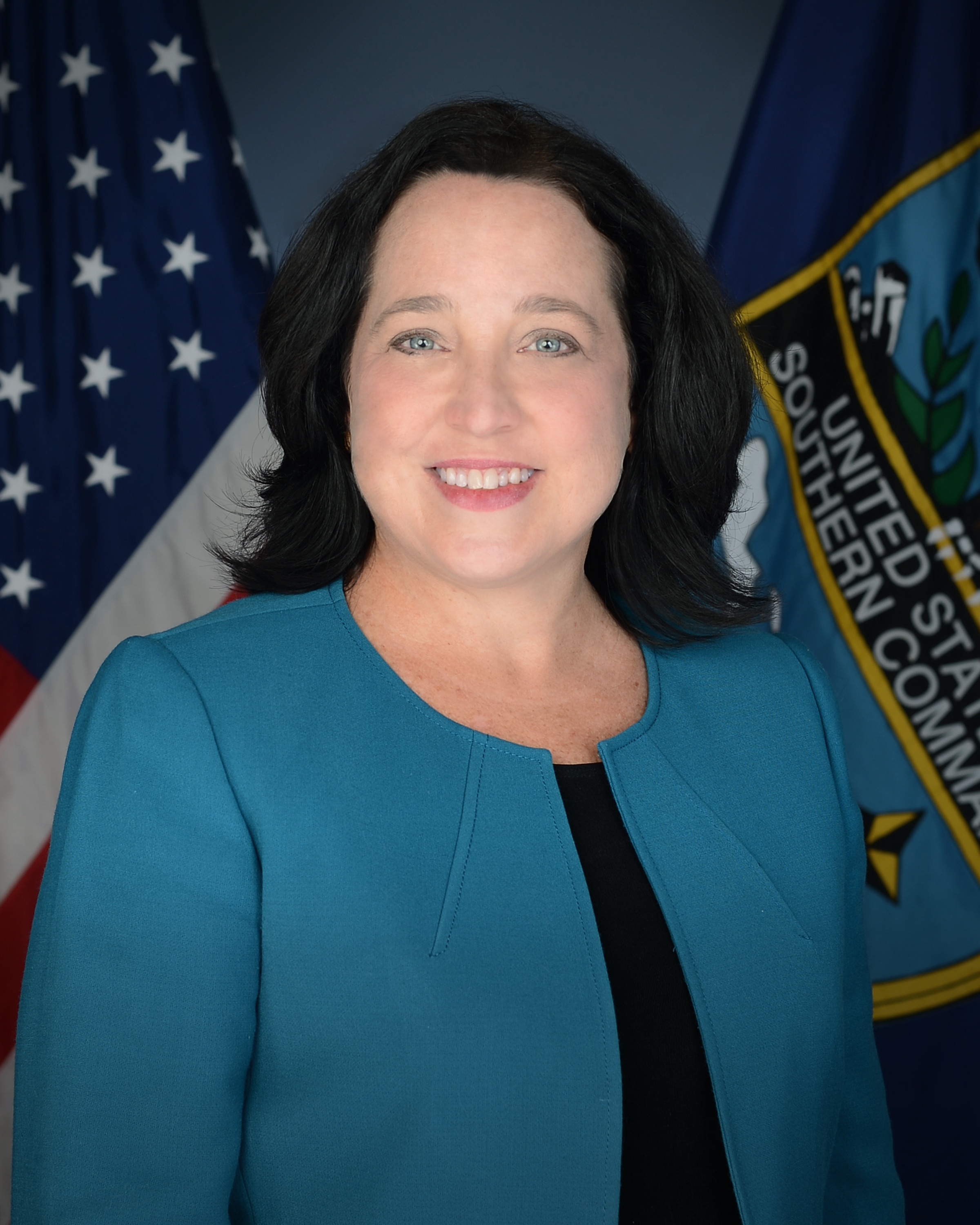

United States Ambassador to El Salvador
- In office March 30, 2016 – July 31, 2019
- President: Barack Obama; Donald Trump
- Preceded by: Mari Carmen Aponte
- Succeeded by: Ronald D. Johnson

Personal details
- Born: 1970 (age 55–56)
- Education: Liberty University; American University

Jean Elizabeth Manes (born 1970) is an American diplomat who currently serves as the Civilian Deputy and Foreign Policy Advisor to General Laura J. Richardson, Commander of the United States Southern Command. She is the former United States Ambassador to El Salvador. Manes was nominated by President Barack Obama on October 21, 2015, and confirmed by the Senate on December 9, 2015.

== Early life and education ==
Manes is a native of Pompano Beach, Florida. Her parents, Roger and Betty Manes, built a family business. Manes attended Highlands Christian Academy through high school, graduating in 1988. She attended Liberty University as an undergraduate, where she played volleyball and coached the men's club volleyball team. She earned her bachelor's degree in Foreign Policy there in 1992.

== Career ==
Manes began her career in Washington, D.C. She accepted an internship with the Senate Foreign Relations Committee chaired by Claiborne Pell, and worked for the U.S. Information Agency in Washington, D.C. from 1992 to 1999. During that time, she also attended American University, where she earned a Master's in Public Administration in 1996. Her subsequent assignments in the Foreign Service included ones at U.S. embassies in Buenos Aires, Argentina; Montevideo, Uruguay; Ponta Delgada-Azores, Portugal; and Brasilia, Brazil.

Manes served as Counselor for Public Affairs at the U.S. Embassy in Kabul, Afghanistan from 2012 to 2013, and then accepted a short assignment in Ft. Lauderdale as deputy director of the State Department's Florida Regional Center. She later served as Principal Deputy Coordinator at the Bureau of International Information Programs.

=== Tenure in El Salvador ===
In October 2015, President Barack Obama nominated Manes to become U.S. Ambassador to El Salvador, and she was confirmed by the Senate in December 2015. She served as ambassador until July 31, 2019.

On May 26, 2021, it was announced that Manes had been designated as Chargé d'affaires ad interim to the Republic of El Salvador. She left the post in November 2021 after indicating that she believed the government of El Salvador was not interested in relations with the United States.

=== Ambassador to Colombia Nomination ===
On January 3, 2023, President Joe Biden nominated Manes to be the ambassador to Colombia. Her nomination expired on January 3, 2024, while pending before the Senate Foreign Relations Committee and was not resubmitted.

=== UNESCO ===
Manes appointed Chargé d'affaires ad interim to UNESCO in February 2024.

Diplomatic posts
Preceded by Mari Carmen Aponte	United States Ambassador to El Salvador; 2015–2019	Succeeded by Ronald D. Johnson
