= Arch Street, The Greenwich Teen Center =

Teen center in Greenwich, Connecticut

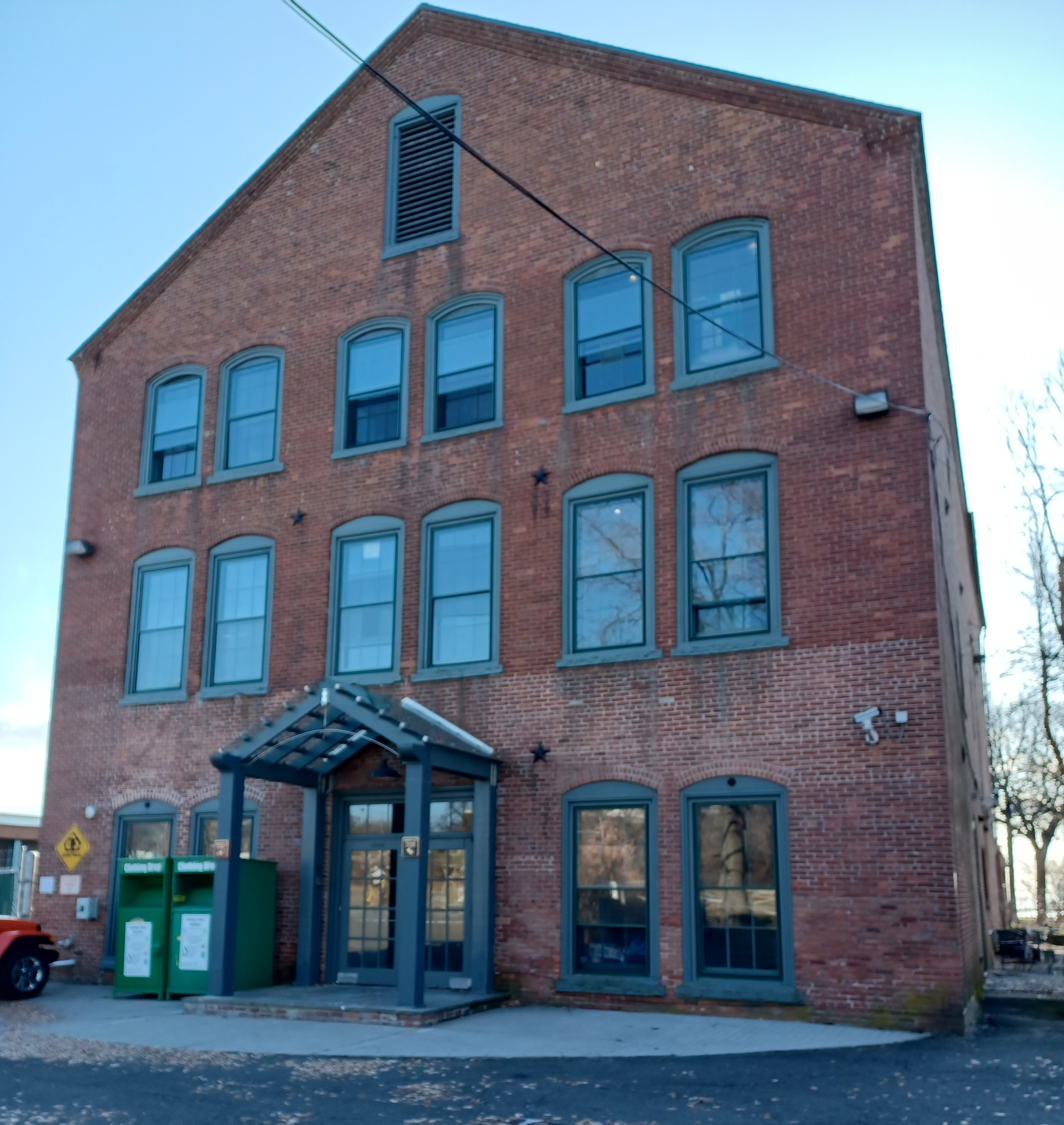
Prior Location of GREENWICH TEEN CENTER, INC. at 100 Arch Street

Arch Street, The Greenwich Teen Center is the longest-running, privately funded teen center in the USA. It was established in 1981, and is located in Greenwich, Connecticut. The Executive Director of the teen center is Kyle Silver. Age starts at 12.

The Greenwich Teen Center's lease at 100 Arch Street expired on December 31, 2025. It no longer operates at this location.

The Greenwich Teen Center was evicted from its location at 255 Field Point Road for Failure to Pay Rent. It no longer operates at this location.

*** There is no known legal entity, DBA, nor tradename (Federal nor Connecticut State, past or present) of the Arch Street, Greenwich Teen Center entity.

The GREENWICH TEEN CENTER INC's EIN is 06-1242185 with the IRS and (as of 10.21.2026) its 501(c)(3) exemption status per irs.gov is:

Exemption Type: 501(c)(3)

Exemption Reinstatement Date:

Revocation Date: 11-15-2019

Revocation Posting Date: 07-24-2026

Lastly, under Connecticut General Statutes § 34-243n, every domestic and foreign LLC must have a registered agent at all times. The listed agent for The Greenwich Teen Center filed her resignation as of 1/31/2026, and no replacement agent has been registered as of as of 10.21.2026.

== Notable ==
- Evan Ross The American Actor and Musician. Son of Diana Ross.
- Pete Francis Heimbold Attended the Greenwich Teen Center and played his first shows with Dispatch.
