= National Order of José Matías Delgado =

Honor awarded in El Salvador

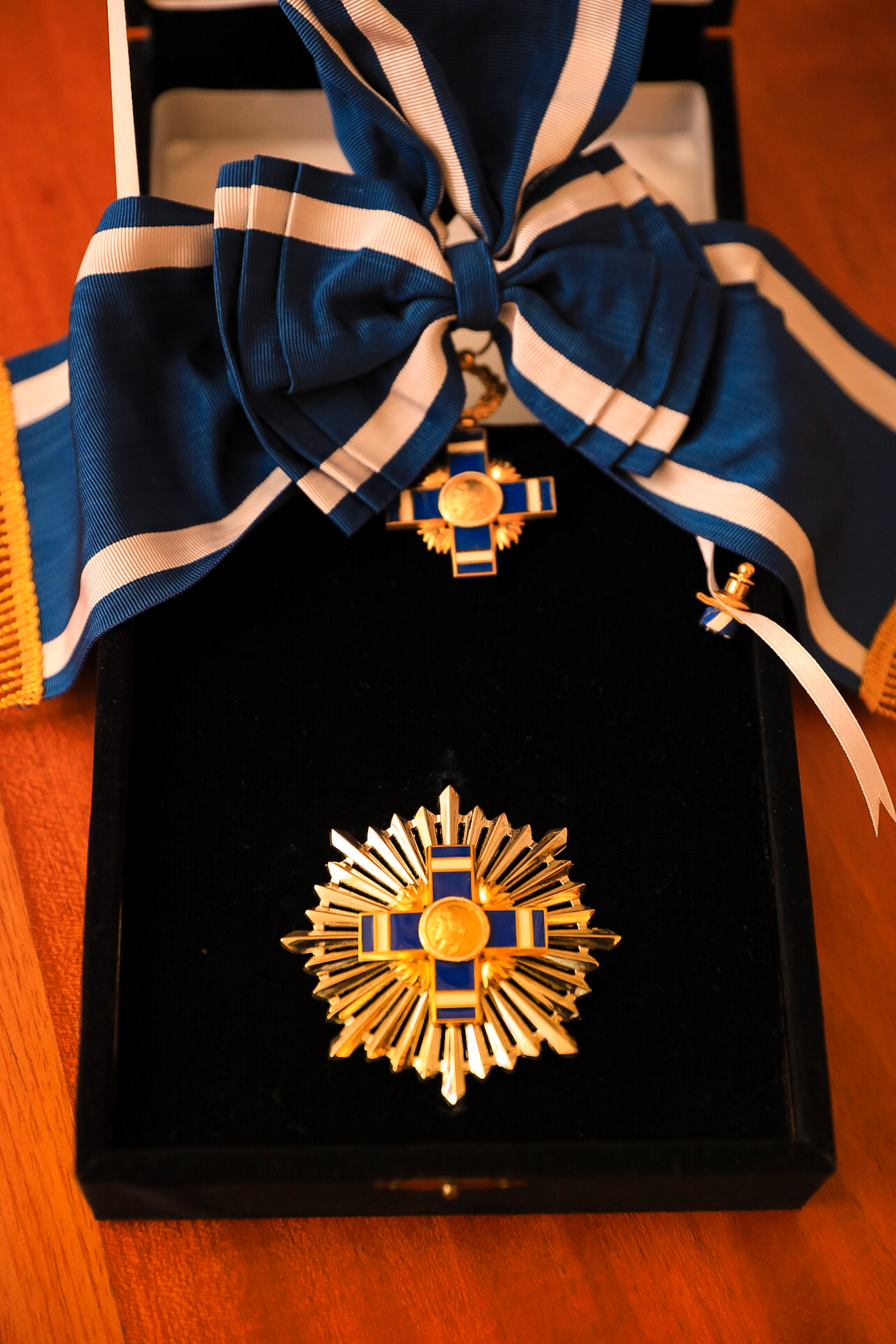

Awarded by El Salvador
- Type: State order
- Established: 14 August 1946
- Country: El Salvador
- Awarded for: To recognise extraordinary merit in humanitarian, literary, scientific, artistic, political and military fields.
- Status: Currently constituted
- Grand Master: President of El Salvador (Nayib Bukele)
- Grades: Grand Cross with Gold Plaque and Special Distinction; Grand Cross with Silver Plaque; Grand Officer; Commander; Knight

Precedence
- Next (higher): Grand Order of Francisco Morazán
- Next (lower): Order of José Simeón Cañas, the Liberator of Slaves
- Ribbon bar

The National Order of José Matías Delgado (Spanish: Orden Nacional de José Matías Delgado) is a distinction granted by the Republic of El Salvador to Heads of State, Salvadoran citizens, or foreigners who are distinguished by eminent services to the country through extraordinary civil virtues which are humanitarian, scientific, literary, artistic, political, or military. The President of El Salvador is the Grand Master of the Order.

== Design ==
The order is named after José Matías Delgado, a Salvadoran priest and doctor known as the "Father of the Central American Fatherland" ("Padre de la Patria Centroamericana"). Delgado was a leading proponent of Central American independence; he was a leader of the 1811 Independence Movement, signed the Act of Independence of Central America of 1821, led the resistance against Mexican efforts to annex Central America in 1822 and 1823, and was a national representative within the Federal Republic of Central America during the 1820s.

The order is presented in five grades: Grand Cross with Gold Plaque and Special Distinction, Grand Cross with Silver Plaque, Grand Officer, Commander, and Knight. Of those, the Grand Cross with Gold Plaque and Special Distinction is reserved only for foreign heads of state, while the remaining grades can be awarded to foreign diplomats and government officials. All Salvadorans are eligible to receive the order, however, Salvadorans serving in public office are ineligible to receive the order.

== History ==
The National Order of José Matías Delgado was established by Decree No. 85, titled "Creation of the National Order of José Matías Delgado". The decree was approved by the Legislative Assembly of El Salvador on 14 August 1946 and signed by President Salvador Castaneda Castro on 29 August 1946.

== Notable recipients ==
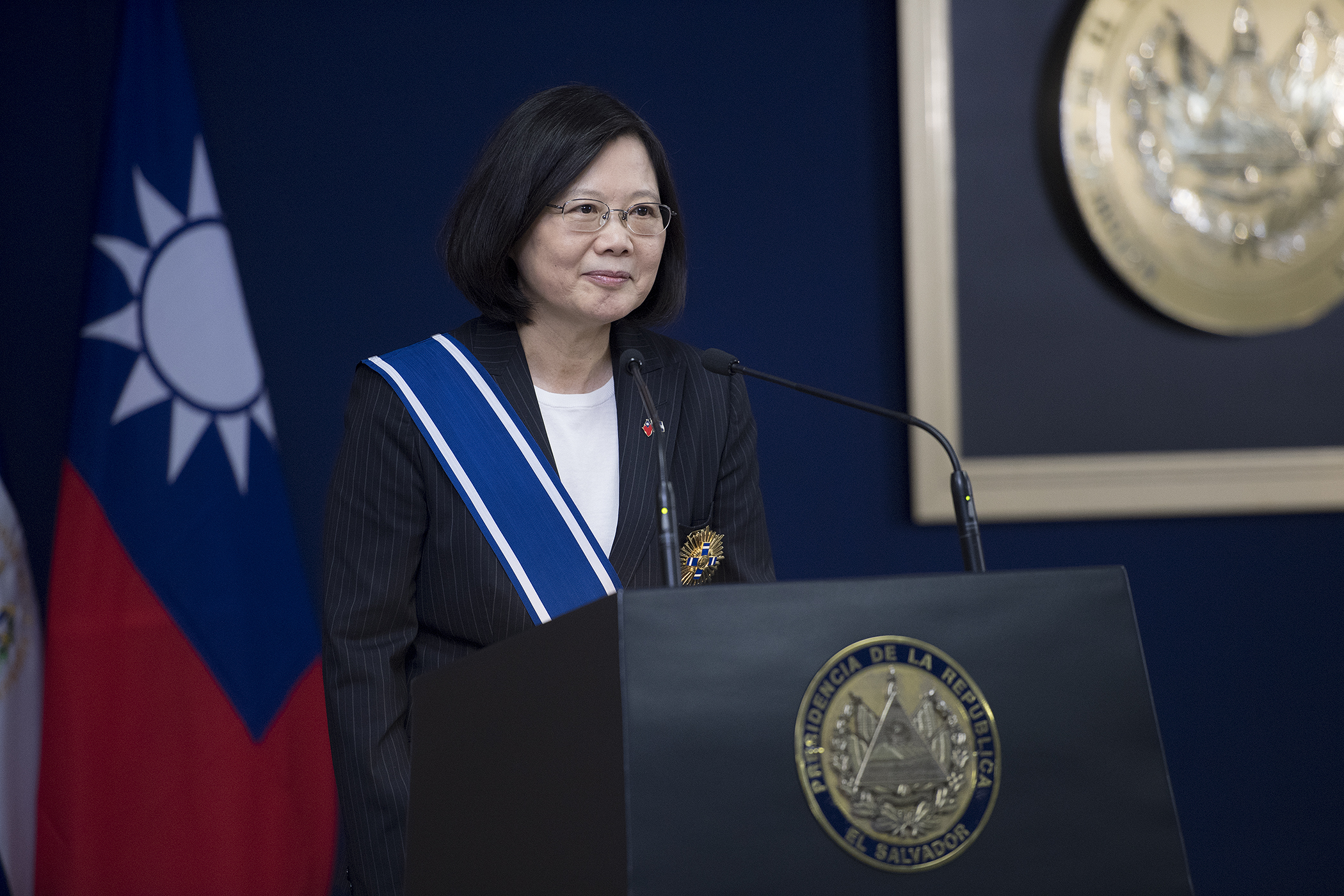
Tsai Ing-wen with the order

- (United States) Eduardo Aguirre
- (El Salvador) Prudencia Ayala †
- (South Korea) Ban Ki-moon
- (El Salvador) Rafael Barrientos
- (Bulgaria) Irina Bokova
- (Mexico) Felipe Calderón
- (Spain) Camilo José Cela †
- (Spain) Felipe VI
- (El Salvador) José Mejía Vides
- (Taiwan) Fredrick Chien
- (El Salvador) Raúl Contreras
- (Spain) Infanta Cristiana
- (United States) Maria Esperanza lara de Flores
- (Costa Rica) José María Figueres
- (El Salvador) Reynaldo Galindo Pohl
- (El Salvador) José Gustavo Guerrero
- (Republic of Ireland) Michael D. Higgins
- (Taiwan) Tsai Ing-wen
- (Spain) Juan Carlos I
- (El Salvador) Claudia Lars
- (Spain) Valero Lecha
- (El Salvador) Mercedes Madriz de Altamirano
- (Israel) Golda Meir
- (Nicaragua) Eduardo Montealegre
- (Japan) Ohira Masayoshi
- (Chile) Augusto Pinochet
- (Italy) Mirko Cuneo
- (Spain) Fernando Sáenz Lacalle
- (Monaco) Rainier III
- (El Salvador) Toño Salazar
- (Uruguay) Julio María Sanguinetti
- (Colombia) Juan Manuel Santos
- (Spain) Queen Sofía
- (Japan) Sonoda Sunao
- (Germany) Jürgen Steinkrüger
- (Guatemala) Miguel Ydígoras Fuentes
- (Guatemala) Raphael Girard †
- (El Salvador) (Spain) 8 Jesuit martyrs †

† - posthumous

== See also ==
- José Matías Delgado
