= 178th New York State Legislature =

New York state legislative session

←	177th	179th	→
- New York State Capitol (2009)

Overview
- Legislative body: New York State Legislature
- Jurisdiction: New York, United States
- Term: January 1, 1969 – December 31, 1970

Senate
- Members: 57
- President: Lt. Gov. Malcolm Wilson (R)
- Temporary President: Earl W. Brydges (R)
- Party control: Republican (33–24)

Assembly
- Members: 150
- Speaker: Perry B. Duryea Jr. (R)
- Party control: Republican; 1969: (76–72–2); 1970: (77–71–2)

Sessions
- 1st: January 8 – May 2, 1969
- 2nd: January 7 – April 20, 1970

The 178th New York State Legislature, consisting of the New York State Senate and the New York State Assembly, met from January 8, 1969, to April 20, 1970, during the eleventh and twelfth years of Nelson Rockefeller's governorship, in Albany.

== Background ==
Under the provisions of the New York Constitution of 1938, and the U.S. Supreme Court decision to follow the One man, one vote rule, re-apportioned in 1966 by order of the New York Court of Appeals, 57 Senators and 150 assemblymen were elected in single-seat districts for two-year terms. Senate and Assembly districts consisted of approximately the same number of inhabitants, the area being apportioned without restrictions regarding county boundaries.

At this time there were two major political parties: the Republican Party and the Democratic Party. The Conservative Party, the Liberal Party, the Peace and Freedom Party, the Socialist Labor Party and the Socialist Workers Party also nominated tickets.

== Elections ==
The 1968 New York state election was held on November 5. The only two statewide elective offices up for election were a seat on the New York Court of Appeals and a U.S. Senator from New York. The incumbent office-holders were re-elected: Judge Adrian P. Burke, a Democrat with Republican, Liberal and Conservative endorsement; and U.S. Senator Jacob K. Javits, a Republican with Liberal endorsement. The approximate party strength at this election, as expressed by the vote for U.S. Senator, was: Republicans/Liberals 3,270,000; Democrats 2,151,000; Conservatives 1,139,000; Peace and Freedom 9,000; Socialist Labor 8,000; and Socialist Workers 5,000.

Two of the four women members of the previous legislature—Assemblywomen Constance E. Cook (Rep.), a lawyer of Ithaca; and Gail Hellenbrand (Dem.), of Brooklyn—were re-elected. Rosemary R. Gunning (Cons.), a lawyer of Ridgewood, Queens; and Mary Anne Krupsak (Dem.), a lawyer of Amsterdam, were also elected to the assembly.

The 1969 New York state election was held on November 4. The only statewide elective office up for election was a seat on the New York Court of Appeals. Two vacancies in the Assembly were filled.

== Sessions ==
The legislature met for the first regular session (the 192nd) at the State Capitol in Albany on January 8, 1969; and recessed on March 30. The legislature met again on April 15; and adjourned sine die on May 2.

Perry B. Duryea Jr. (Rep.) was elected Speaker.

Earl W. Brydges (Rep.) was re-elected temporary president of the state Senate.

On March 28, the legislature increased the state sales tax by 1 percentage point. Democrats Charles F. Stockmeister and Albert J. Hausbeck voted with the Republicans and subsequently were ostracised by their party. Stockmeister was appointed by Gov. Rockefeller to the Civil Service Commission on July 3, 1969. Hausbeck changed parties in 1970, and was re-elected to the Assembly on the Republican and Conservative tickets in November 1970.

On December 3, 1969, the Court of Appeals did not allow a re-apportionment of the legislative districts which the Republican majorities in both Houses intended to enact in time to be used for the elections in November 1970.

The legislature met for the second regular session (the 193rd) at the State Capitol in Albany on January 7, 1970; and adjourned sine die on April 20.

On April 9, 1970, the Assembly passed a bill allowing abortion without restrictions until 24 weeks of pregnancy. The Senate passed the bill on April 10, and Gov. Rockefeller signed it on April 11, thus becoming the law.

== State Senate ==
=== Senators ===
The asterisk (*) denotes members of the previous Legislature who continued in office as members of this Legislature. Jess J. Present changed from the Assembly to the Senate at the beginning of the session.

Note: For brevity, the chairmanships omit the words "...the Committee on (the)..."

District	Senator	Party	Notes
1st	Leon E. Giuffreda*	Republican	
2nd	Bernard C. Smith*	Republican	
3rd	Ralph J. Marino	Republican	
4th	Edward J. Speno*	Republican	
5th	John D. Caemmerer*	Republican	
6th	John R. Dunne*	Republican	
7th	Norman F. Lent*	Republican	on November 3, 1970, elected to the 92nd U.S. Congress
8th	Murray Schwartz*	Democrat	
9th	Jack E. Bronston*	Democrat	
10th	Seymour R. Thaler*	Democrat	
11th	John J. Santucci*	Democrat	
12th	Martin J. Knorr	Republican	
13th	Nicholas Ferraro*	Democrat	
14th	Edward S. Lentol*	Democrat	
15th	A. Frederick Meyerson	Democrat	
16th	William Rosenblatt*	Democrat	
17th	Jeremiah B. Bloom*	Democrat	
18th	Waldaba Stewart	Democrat	
19th	Samuel L. Greenberg*	Democrat	
20th	Albert B. Lewis*	Democrat	
21st	William T. Conklin*	Republican	
22nd	William J. Ferrall*	Democrat	died on December 13, 1970
23rd	John J. Marchi*	Republican	
24th	Paul P. E. Bookson*	Democrat	
25th	Manfred Ohrenstein*	Democrat	
26th	Roy M. Goodman	Republican	
27th	Basil A. Paterson*	Democrat	
28th	Joseph Zaretzki*	Democrat	Minority Leader
29th	Robert García*	Democrat	
30th	Harrison J. Goldin*	Democrat	
31st	Joseph L. Galiber	Democrat	
32nd	Abraham Bernstein*	Democrat	
33rd	John D. Calandra*	Republican	
34th	John E. Flynn*	Republican	
35th	Anthony B. Gioffre*	Republican	
36th	Bernard G. Gordon*	Republican	
37th	D. Clinton Dominick III*	Republican	
38th	Jay P. Rolison Jr.*	Republican	
39th	Douglas Hudson*	Republican	
40th	Walter B. Langley	Republican	
41st	Dalwin J. Niles*	Republican	
42nd	Ronald B. Stafford*	Republican	
43rd	Hugh Douglas Barclay*	Republican	
44th	James H. Donovan*	Republican	
45th	John H. Hughes*	Republican	Chairman of Judiciary
46th	Tarky Lombardi Jr.*	Republican	
47th	Warren M. Anderson*	Republican	Chairman of Finance
48th	William T. Smith*	Republican	
49th	Theodore D. Day*	Republican	
50th	Thomas Laverne*	Republican	
51st	James E. Powers*	Democrat	
52nd	Earl W. Brydges*	Republican	re-elected Temporary President
53rd	William E. Adams*	Republican	on December 29, 1970, appointed Counsel to the NYS Board of Standards and Appeals
54th	Thomas F. McGowan*	Republican	
55th	Frank J. Glinski*	Democrat	
56th	James D. Griffin*	Democrat	
57th	Jess J. Present*	Republican	

=== Employees ===
- Secretary: Albert J. Abrams

== State Assembly ==
=== Assembly members ===
The asterisk (*) denotes members of the previous Legislature who continued in office as members of this Legislature.

Note: For brevity, the chairmanships omit the words "...the Committee on (the)..."

District	Assembly member	Party	Notes
1st	Perry B. Duryea Jr.*	Republican	elected Speaker
2nd	Peter J. Costigan*	Republican	
3rd	Charles A. Jerabek	Cons./Rep.	
4th	Prescott B. Huntington*	Republican	
5th	William L. Burns*	Republican	
6th	John G. McCarthy*	Republican	
7th	Joseph M. Reilly*	Republican	
8th	Martin Ginsberg*	Republican	
9th	Francis P. McCloskey*	Republican	
10th	Milton Jonas*	Republican	
11th	Stanley Harwood*	Democrat	
12th	Joseph M. Margiotta*	Republican	
13th	John S. Thorp Jr.*	Democrat	
14th	Arthur J. Kremer*	Democrat	
15th	Eli Wager*	Democrat	
16th	George J. Farrell Jr.*	Republican	
17th	John E. Kingston*	Republican	Majority Leader
18th	Vincent R. Balletta Jr.*	Republican	
19th	Herbert A. Posner*	Democrat	
20th	Joseph J. Kunzeman*	Republican	
21st	Martin Rodell*	Democrat	
22nd	John T. Gallagher*	Republican	
23rd	Leonard P. Stavisky*	Democrat	
24th	Arthur J. Cooperman	Democrat	
25th	Moses M. Weinstein*	Democrat	on November 4, 1969, elected to the New York Supreme Court
25th	Emanuel R. Gold	Democrat	on February 17, 1970, elected to fill vacancy
26th	Guy R. Brewer	Democrat	
27th	Herbert J. Miller*	Democrat	
28th	Alfred D. Lerner*	Republican	
29th	Frederick D. Schmidt*	Democrat	
30th	John T. Flack	Republican	
31st	Joseph F. Lisa	Democrat	
32nd	Jules G. Sabbatino*	Democrat	
33rd	Joseph S. Calabretta*	Democrat	
34th	Rosemary R. Gunning	Cons./Rep.	
35th	Chester J. Straub*	Democrat	
36th	Rudolph F. DiBlasi*	Democrat	resigned to run for the New York City Council
36th	Peter G. Mirto	Democrat	on November 4, 1969, elected to fill vacancy
37th	Samuel D. Wright*	Democrat	
38th	Vito P. Battista	Republican	
39th	Stanley Fink	Democrat	
40th	Alfred A. Lama*	Democrat	
41st	Stanley Steingut*	Democrat	Minority Leader
42nd	Lawrence P. Murphy*	Democrat	
43rd	George A. Cincotta*	Democrat	
44th	Sidney A. Lichtman	Democrat	
45th	Stephen J. Solarz	Democrat	
46th	Leonard M. Simon*	Democrat	
47th	Salvatore J. Grieco*	Democrat	
48th	Leonard Silverman	Democrat	
49th	Dominick L. DiCarlo*	Republican	
50th	Robert F. Kelly*	Republican	
51st	Vincent A. Riccio	Republican	
52nd	Joseph J. Dowd*	Democrat	
53rd	William J. Giordano*	Democrat	
54th	Gail Hellenbrand*	Democrat	
55th	Thomas R. Fortune	Democrat	
56th	Bertram L. Baker*	Democrat	
57th	Harvey L. Strelzin	Democrat	
58th	Lucio F. Russo*	Republican	
59th	Edward J. Amann Jr.*	Republican	
60th	Louis DeSalvio*	Democrat	
61st	Anthony G. DiFalco	Democrat	
62nd	Andrew J. Stein	Democrat	
63rd	William F. Passannante*	Democrat	
64th	Peter A. A. Berle	Democrat	
65th	Jerome Kretchmer*	Democrat	
66th	Stephen C. Hansen	Republican	
67th	Albert H. Blumenthal*	Democrat	
68th	Frank G. Rossetti*	Democrat	
69th	Franz S. Leichter	Democrat	
70th	Hulan E. Jack*	Democrat	
71st	Stephen S. Gottlieb	Democrat	
72nd	Charles B. Rangel*	Democrat	on November 3, 1970, elected to the 92nd U.S. Congress
73rd	John J. Walsh*	Democrat	
74th	Mark T. Southall*	Democrat	
75th	Harry Kraf*	Democrat	
76th	Seymour Posner*	Democrat	
77th	Armando Montano	Democrat	
78th	Edward A. Stevenson, Sr.*	Democrat	
79th	Manuel Ramos*	Democrat	
80th	Ferdinand J. Mondello*	Democrat	
81st	Robert Abrams*	Democrat	on November 4, 1969, elected Borough President of the Bronx
81st	Alan Hochberg	Democrat	on February 17, 1970, elected to fill vacancy
82nd	Alexander Chananau*	Democrat	
83rd	Burton Hecht*	Democrat	
84th	Benjamin Altman*	Democrat	on January 6, 1970, appointed as NYC Commissioner of Rent and Housing Maintenance
84th	G. Oliver Koppell	Ind. Dem.	on March 3, 1970, elected to fill vacancy
85th	Anthony J. Mercorella*	Democrat	
86th	Anthony J. Stella	Democrat	
87th	Thomas J. McInerney*	Democrat	
88th	George E. Van Cott*	Republican	
89th	Alvin M. Suchin*	Republican	
90th	Gordon W. Burrows*	Republican	
91st	Joseph R. Pisani*	Republican	
92nd	Richard A. Cerosky*	Republican	
93rd	Peter R. Biondo*	Republican	
94th	Eugene Levy	Republican	
95th	Benjamin A. Gilman*	Republican	
96th	Daniel Becker	Republican	
97th	Willis H. Stephens*	Republican	Chairman of Ways and Means
98th	Emeel S. Betros	Republican	
99th	H. Clark Bell	Republican	
100th	Clarence D. Lane*	Republican	
101st	Neil W. Kelleher*	Republican	
102nd	Raymond C. Skuse	Republican	
103rd	Fred G. Field Jr.	Republican	
104th	Mary Anne Krupsak	Democrat	
105th	Clark C. Wemple*	Republican	
106th	Fred W. Droms Jr.*	Republican	
107th	Lawrence E. Corbett Jr.*	Republican	
108th	Andrew W. Ryan Jr.	Republican	
109th	Glenn H. Harris*	Republican	
110th	Edward J. Keenan*	Republican	
111th	Donald L. Taylor*	Republican	
112th	Donald J. Mitchell*	Republican	
113th	Edwyn E. Mason*	Republican	
114th	Richard A. Brown*	Republican	
115th	William R. Sears*	Republican	
116th	John T. Buckley*	Republican	
117th	Edward F. Crawford*	Republican	Chairman of Judiciary
118th	Leonard F. Bersani	Republican	
119th	Kenneth G. Bartlett*	Republican	
120th	Mortimer P. Gallivan*	Democrat	
121st	John H. Terry*	Republican	on November 3, 1970, elected to the 92nd U.S. Congress
122nd	George M. Michaels	Democrat	
123rd	Kenneth S. Leasure*	Republican	
124th	Francis J. Boland Jr.*	Republican	
125th	Constance E. Cook*	Republican	
126th	L. Richard Marshall*	Republican	
127th	Charles D. Henderson*	Republican	
128th	Frederick L. Warder*	Republican	
129th	Joseph C. Finley*	Republican	
130th	Donald C. Shoemaker*	Republican	
131st	Raymond J. Lill*	Democrat	
132nd	S. William Rosenberg*	Republican	
133rd	Frank A. Carroll*	Republican	
134th	Charles F. Stockmeister*	Democrat	on July 3, 1969, appointed to the New York State Civil Service Commission
134th	William M. Steinfeldt	Republican	on November 4, 1969, elected to fill vacancy
135th	Don W. Cook*	Republican	
136th	James L. Emery*	Republican	
137th	V. Sumner Carroll*	Republican	
138th	Gregory J. Pope*	Democrat	
139th	Lloyd J. Long*	Republican	
140th	James T. McFarland*	Republican	
141st	Chester R. Hardt*	Republican	
142nd	Stephen R. Greco*	Democrat	
143rd	Arthur O. Eve*	Democrat	
144th	Albert J. Hausbeck*	Democrat	
145th	John B. Lis*	Democrat	
146th	Francis J. Griffin*	Democrat	
147th	Ronald H. Tills	Republican	
148th	Frank Walkley*	Republican	
149th	Lloyd A. Russell*	Republican	
150th	John W. Beckman	Republican	

=== Employees ===
- Clerk: Donald A. Campbell

== Sources ==
- Assembly winners and Senate leaders in The Geneva Times, of Geneva, on November 6, 1968
