= 177th New York State Legislature =

New York state legislative session

←	176th	178th	→
- New York State Capitol (2009)

Overview
- Legislative body: New York State Legislature
- Jurisdiction: New York, United States
- Term: January 1, 1967 – December 31, 1968

Senate
- Members: 57
- President: Lt. Gov. Malcolm Wilson (R)
- Temporary President: Earl W. Brydges (R)
- Party control: Republican (31–26)

Assembly
- Members: 150
- Speaker: Anthony J. Travia (D), until July 17, 1968; Moses M. Weinstein (D), acting from July 23, 1968
- Party control: Democratic (80–70)

Sessions
- 1st: January 4 – April 2, 1967
- 2nd: January 3 – May 25, 1968

The 177th New York State Legislature, consisting of the New York State Senate and the New York State Assembly, met from January 4, 1967, to May 25, 1968, during the ninth and tenth years of Nelson Rockefeller's governorship, in Albany.

== Background ==
Under the provisions of the New York Constitution of 1938, re-apportioned in 1953, 58 Senators and 150 assemblymen were elected in single-seat districts for two-year terms. The senatorial districts consisted either of one or more entire counties; or a contiguous area within a single county. The Assembly districts consisted either of a single entire county (except Hamilton Co.), or of contiguous area within one county.

In 1964, the U.S. Supreme Court handed down several decisions establishing that State legislatures should follow the One man, one vote rule to apportion their election districts. A special Federal Statutory Court declared the New York apportionment formulae for both the State Senate and the State Assembly unconstitutional, and the State Legislature was ordered to re-apportion the seats by April 1, 1965. The court also ruled that the 1964 legislative election should be held under the 1954 apportionment, but those elected could serve only for one year (in 1965), and an election under the new apportionment should be held in November 1965. Senators John H. Hughes and Lawrence M. Rulison (both Rep.) questioned the authority of the federal court to shorten the term of the 1964 electees, alleging excessive costs for the additional election in an off-year.

The lame-duck Legislature of 1964 met for a special session at the State Capitol in Albany from December 15 to 31, 1964, to re-apportion the legislative districts for the election in November 1965, gerrymandering the districts according to the wishes of the Republican majority before the Democrats would take over the Legislature in January. The number of seats in the State Senate was increased to 65, and the number of seats in the Assembly to 165. County representation was abandoned in favor of population-proportional districts, and the new Assembly districts were numbered from 1 to 165.

On February 1, 1965, the United States Supreme Court confirmed the Federal Statutory Court's order to elect a new New York Legislature in November 1965.

On April 14, 1965, the New York Court of Appeals declared the apportionment of December 1964 as unconstitutional, citing that the New York Constitution provides expressly that the Assembly shall have 150 seats, not 165 as were apportioned. The court also held that, although the constitutional State Senate apportionment formula provides for additional seats, the increase from 58 to 65 was unwarranted.

On May 10, the Federal Statutory Court ordered that the election on November 2, 1965, be held under the December 1964 apportionment, and that the Legislature thus elected re-apportion the seats again by February 1, 1966.

On August 24, it was clarified that, if the Governor and Legislature should not have enacted a new apportionment by February 1, 1966, then the courts should draft a new apportionment for the next election.

On October 11, the U.S. Supreme Court dismissed four appeals against the ruling of the Federal Statutory Court, and upheld the election of a new New York Legislature on November 2.

On January 14, 1966, the Court of Appeals moved the deadline for the new legislative apportionment from February 1 to February 15.

On February 23, the Court of Appeal appointed a commission of five members to map out new districts because the Republican-majority Senate and the Democratic-majority Assembly could not agree on a new apportionment. The commission was chaired by President-elect of the American Bar Association Orison S. Marden, of Scarsdale, who was not affiliated with any party and was deemed politically independent. The other members were Ex-Judges of the Court of Appeals Bruce Bromley (Rep.), of Manhattan, and Charles W. Froessel (Dem.), of Queens; Ex-Republican State Chairman Edwin F. Jaeckle, of Buffalo; and Robert B. Brady (Dem.), the Counsel to the Joint Legislative Committee on Re-Apportionment.

On March 14, the apportionment draft was submitted to the Court of Appeals.

On March 22, the Court of Appeals accepted the apportionment as drafted, thus becoming the law, without the need of legislative approval. The number of seats in the State Senate was reduced to 57, and the number of seats in the Assembly to 150.

At this time there were two major political parties: the Democratic Party and the Republican Party. The Conservative Party, the Liberal Party, the Socialist Labor Party and the Socialist Workers Party also nominated tickets.

== Elections ==
The 1966 New York state election was held on November 8. Governor Nelson Rockefeller and Lieutenant Governor Malcolm Wilson were re-elected, both Republicans. The elections to the other three statewide elective offices resulted in a Republican Attorney General; a Democratic State Comptroller with Liberal endorsement; and a Republican Chief Judge with Democratic, Conservative and Liberal endorsement. The approximate party strength at this election, as expressed by the vote for Governor and Lieutenant Governor, was: Republicans 2,691,000; Democrats 2,298,000; Conservatives 513,000; Liberals 507,000; Socialist Labor 12,700; and Socialist Workers 12,500.

All four women members of the previous legislature—Assemblywomen Shirley Chisholm (Dem.), a preschool teacher of Brooklyn; Constance E. Cook (Rep.), a lawyer of Ithaca; Gail Hellenbrand (Dem.), of Brooklyn; and Dorothy H. Rose (Dem.), a high-school teacher and librarian of Angola—were re-elected.

At the same time, 186 delegates to a New York State Constitutional Convention were elected: 15 statewide at-large, and three in each senatorial district. The final result was the election of 101 Democrat/Liberals and 85 Republican/Conservatives.

The 1967 New York state election was held on November 7. The only statewide elective offices up for election were two seats on the New York Court of Appeals. One vacancy in the State Assembly was filled. The proposed changes to the Constitution were rejected by the voters. The approximate party strength at this election, as expressed by the average vote for Judge of the Court of Appeals, was: Republicans 2,161,000; Democrats 2,070,000; Conservatives 402,000; and Liberals 202,000.

== Sessions ==
The Legislature met for the first regular session (the 190th) at the State Capitol in Albany on January 4, 1967; and adjourned in the morning of April 2.

Anthony J. Travia (Dem.) was re-elected Speaker.

Earl W. Brydges (Rep.) was re-elected Temporary President of the State Senate.

The Constitutional Convention met at the State Capitol in Albany on April 4; and adjourned on September 26. Speaker Anthony J. Travia (Dem.) was elected President of the convention.

The Legislature met for the second regular session (the 191st) at the State Capitol in Albany on January 3, 1968; and adjourned on May 25.

== State Senate ==
=== Senators ===
The asterisk (*) denotes members of the previous Legislature who continued in office as members of this Legislature. Douglas Hudson and James E. Powers changed from the Assembly to the Senate at the beginning of the session. Assemblyman Robert García was elected to fill a vacancy in the Senate.

Note: For brevity, the chairmanships omit the words "...the Committee on (the)..."

District	Senator	Party	Notes
1st	Leon E. Giuffreda*	Republican	
2nd	Bernard C. Smith*	Republican	
3rd	Henry M. Curran*	Rep./Lib.	
4th	Edward J. Speno*	Republican	
5th	John D. Caemmerer*	Republican	
6th	John R. Dunne*	Republican	
7th	Norman F. Lent*	Republican	
8th	Murray Schwartz*	Dem./Lib.	
9th	Jack E. Bronston*	Dem./lib.	
10th	Seymour R. Thaler*	Dem./Lib.	
11th	Irving Mosberg*	Dem./Lib.	on November 7, 1967, elected to the New York City Civil Court
11th	John J. Santucci	Democrat	on February 20, 1968, elected to fill vacancy
12th	William C. Brennan	Dem./Lib.	on November 5, 1968, elected to the New York City Civil Court
13th	Nicholas Ferraro*	Democrat	
14th	Edward S. Lentol*	Democrat	
15th	Simon J. Liebowitz*	Dem./Lib.	on November 5, 1968, elected to the New York City Civil Court
16th	William Rosenblatt*	Dem./Lib.	
17th	Jeremiah B. Bloom*	Dem./Lib.	
18th	William C. Thompson*	Dem./Lib.	on November 5, 1968, elected to the New York City Council
19th	Samuel L. Greenberg*	Dem./Lib.	
20th	Albert B. Lewis	Democrat	
21st	William T. Conklin*	Republican	
22nd	William J. Ferrall*	Democrat	
23rd	John J. Marchi*	Rep./Cons.	
24th	Paul P. E. Bookson*	Democrat	
25th	Manfred Ohrenstein*	Democrat	
26th	Whitney North Seymour Jr.*	Republican	
27th	Basil A. Paterson*	Dem./Lib.	
28th	Joseph Zaretzki*	Dem./Lib.	Minority Leader
29th	(Eugene Rodriguez)	Democrat	did not take his seat; on January 13, 1967, convicted of perjury and extortion
29th	Robert García*	Democrat	on March 28, 1967, elected to fill vacancy
30th	Harrison J. Goldin*	Dem./Lib.	
31st	Ivan Warner	Democrat	on November 5, 1968, elected to the New York Supreme Court
32nd	Abraham Bernstein*	Dem./Lib.	
33rd	John D. Calandra*	Rep./Cons.	
34th	John E. Flynn	Republican	
35th	Anthony B. Gioffre*	Republican	
36th	Bernard G. Gordon*	Republican	
37th	D. Clinton Dominick III*	Republican	
38th	Jay P. Rolison Jr.	Republican	
39th	Douglas Hudson*	Republican	
40th	Julian B. Erway*	Democrat	
41st	Dalwin J. Niles*	Republican	
42nd	Ronald B. Stafford*	Republican	
43rd	Hugh Douglas Barclay*	Rep./Cons.	
44th	James H. Donovan*	Republican	
45th	John H. Hughes*	Republican	Chairman of Judiciary
46th	Tarky Lombardi Jr.*	Republican	
47th	Warren M. Anderson*	Republican	Chairman of Finance
48th	William T. Smith*	Republican	
49th	Theodore D. Day*	Republican	
50th	Thomas Laverne*	Republican	
51st	James E. Powers*	Dem./Lib.	
52nd	Earl W. Brydges*	Republican	re-elected Temporary President
53rd	William E. Adams*	Republican	
54th	Thomas F. McGowan*	Rep./Lib.	
55th	Frank J. Glinski*	Dem./Lib.	
56th	James D. Griffin	Democrat	
57th	James F. Hastings*	Republican	on November 5, 1968, elected to the 91st U.S. Congress

=== Employees ===
- Secretary: Albert J. Abrams

== State Assembly ==
=== Assemblymen ===
The asterisk (*) denotes members of the previous Legislature who continued in office as members of this Legislature.

Note: For brevity, the chairmanships omit the words "...the Committee on (the)..."

District	Assemblymen	Party	Notes
1st	Perry B. Duryea Jr.*	Republican	Minority Leader
2nd	Peter J. Costigan*	Republican	
3rd	Charles J. Melton*	Dem./Cons.	
4th	Prescott B. Huntington*	Republican	
5th	William L. Burns*	Republican	
6th	John G. McCarthy*	Republican	
7th	Joseph M. Reilly*	Rep./Lib.	
8th	Martin Ginsberg*	Republican	
9th	Francis P. McCloskey*	Republican	
10th	Milton Jonas*	Republican	
11th	Stanley Harwood*	Democrat	
12th	Joseph M. Margiotta*	Republican	
13th	John S. Thorp Jr.*	Dem./Lib.	
14th	Arthur J. Kremer*	Democrat	
15th	Eli Wager*	Democrat	
16th	George J. Farrell Jr.*	Republican	
17th	John E. Kingston*	Republican	
18th	Vincent R. Balletta Jr.	Republican	
19th	Herbert A. Posner	Democrat	
20th	Joseph J. Kunzeman*	Republican	
21st	Martin Rodell*	Dem./Lib.	
22nd	John T. Gallagher*	Republican	
23rd	Leonard P. Stavisky*	Dem./Lib.	
24th	Seymour Boyers	Democrat	
25th	Moses M. Weinstein*	Democrat	Majority Leader; Acting Speaker from July 23, 1968
26th	Kenneth N. Browne*	Democrat	
27th	Herbert J. Miller*	Dem./Lib.	
28th	Alfred D. Lerner*	Republican	
29th	Frederick D. Schmidt*	Democrat	
30th	Stanley J. Pryor*	Dem./Lib.	
31st	Sidney Lebowitz*	Democrat	
32nd	Jules G. Sabbatino*	Democrat	Chairman of Military Affairs
33rd	Thomas V. LaFauci*	Democrat	Chairman of Codes; on November 7, 1967, elected to the New York City Civil Court
33rd	Joseph S. Calabretta	Democrat	on February 20, 1968, elected to fill vacancy
34th	Thomas P. Cullen*	Democrat	died on January 24, 1968
35th	Chester J. Straub	Democrat	
36th	Rudolph F. DiBlasi	Democrat	
37th	Samuel D. Wright*	Democrat	
38th	Anthony J. Travia*	Democrat	re-elected Speaker; Chairman of Rules appointed to the U.S. District Court for the Eastern D. of NY
39th	Leonard E. Yoswein*	Democrat	Chairman of Mental Hygiene
40th	Alfred A. Lama*	Democrat	Chairman of Banks
41st	Stanley Steingut*	Democrat	Chairman of General Laws
42nd	Lawrence P. Murphy*	Dem./Lib.	Chairman of Mortgage and Real Estate
43rd	George A. Cincotta*	Democrat	Chairman of Excise
44th	Bertram L. Podell*	Democrat	Chairman of Local Finance; on February 20, 1968, elected to the 90th U.S. Congress
45th	Max M. Turshen*	Democrat	Chairman of Judiciary
46th	Leonard M. Simon	Democrat	
47th	Salvatore J. Grieco*	Democrat	
48th	Joseph Kottler*	Democrat	Chairman of Penal Institutions
49th	Dominick L. DiCarlo*	Republican	
50th	Robert F. Kelly*	Republican	
51st	Joseph S. Levine	Democrat	
52nd	Joseph J. Dowd*	Democrat	Chairman of Commerce and Navigation
53rd	William J. Giordano*	Democrat	
54th	Gail Hellenbrand*	Democrat	
55th	Shirley Chisholm*	Democrat	on November 5, 1968, elected to the 91st U.S. Congress
56th	Bertram L. Baker*	Democrat	Chairman of Education
57th	Harold W. Cohn*	Democrat	Chairman of Public Service
58th	Lucio F. Russo*	Rep./Cons.	
59th	Edward J. Amann Jr.*	Republican	
60th	Louis DeSalvio*	Democrat	Chairman of Insurance
61st	Jerome W. Marks*	Dem./Lib.	Chairman of Aviation
62nd	William F. Larkin	Republican	
63rd	William F. Passannante*	Democrat	Chairman of Charitable and Religious Societies
64th	John M. Burns*	Republican	
65th	Jerome Kretchmer*	Democrat	Chairman of Housing
66th	S. William Green*	Republican	
67th	Albert H. Blumenthal*	Democrat	Chairman of Health
68th	Frank G. Rossetti*	Democrat	Chairman of Labor and Industries
69th	Daniel M. Kelly*	Democrat	Chairman of Taxation
70th	Jose Ramos-Lopez*	Dem./Lib.	Chairman of Social Welfare and Relief; on November 7, 1967, elected to the New York City Civil Court
70th	Hulan E. Jack	Democrat	on February 20, 1968, elected to fill vacancy
71st	Orest V. Maresca*	Democrat	Chairman of Affairs of the City of New York; on November 5, 1968, elected to the New York City Civil Court
72nd	Charles B. Rangel	Dem./Lib.	
73rd	John J. Walsh*	Democrat	Chairman of Public Institutions
74th	Mark T. Southall*	Democrat	Chairman of Printed and Engrossed Bills
75th	Harry Kraf	Democrat	
76th	Seymour Posner*	Dem./Lib.	
77th	Robert García*	Democrat	resigned on April 17, 1967
77th	William Martinez	Democrat	on November 7, 1967, elected to fill vacancy
78th	Edward A. Stevenson, Sr.*	Democrat	
79th	Manuel Ramos	Democrat	
80th	Ferdinand J. Mondello*	Dem./Cons.	Chairman of Revision
81st	Robert Abrams*	Democrat	
82nd	Alexander Chananau*	Democrat	Chairman of Civil Service
83rd	Burton Hecht*	Democrat	Chairman of Claims
84th	Benjamin Altman*	Democrat	
85th	Anthony J. Mercorella*	Dem./Lib.	
86th	Joseph A. Fusco	Republican	
87th	Thomas J. McInerney*	Dem./Lib.	
88th	George E. Van Cott*	Republican	
89th	Alvin M. Suchin*	Republican	
90th	Gordon W. Burrows*	Republican	
91st	Joseph R. Pisani*	Republican	
92nd	Richard A. Cerosky*	Republican	
93rd	Peter R. Biondo*	Republican	
94th	Joseph T. St. Lawrence*	Dem./Lib.	
95th	Benjamin A. Gilman	Republican	
96th	Gordon K. Cameron	Democrat	
97th	Willis H. Stephens*	Republican	
98th	Victor C. Waryas*	Democrat	Chairman of Agriculture
99th	Kenneth L. Wilson*	Republican	
100th	Clarence D. Lane*	Republican	
101st	Neil W. Kelleher	Republican	
102nd	Frank P. Cox*	Democrat	Chairman of Public Printing
103rd	Harvey M. Lifset*	Democrat	Chairman of Ways and Means
104th	Donald A. Campbell*	Republican	
105th	Clark C. Wemple*	Republican	
106th	Fred W. Droms Jr.	Republican	
107th	Lawrence E. Corbett Jr.*	Republican	
108th	Louis Wolfe*	Democrat	
109th	Glenn H. Harris	Republican	
110th	Edward J. Keenan	Republican	
111th	Donald L. Taylor*	Republican	
112th	Donald J. Mitchell*	Republican	
113th	Edwyn E. Mason*	Rep./Cons.	
114th	Harold I. Tyler*	Republican	died on November 23, 1967
114th	Richard A. Brown	Republican	on January 16, 1968, elected to fill vacancy
115th	William R. Sears*	Rep./Lib.	
116th	John T. Buckley	Republican	
117th	Edward F. Crawford*	Republican	
118th	James J. Barry*	Democrat	Chairman of Affairs of Cities
119th	Kenneth G. Bartlett	Republican	
120th	Mortimer P. Gallivan	Democrat	
121st	John H. Terry*	Republican	
122nd	Louis H. Folmer*	Republican	
123rd	Kenneth S. Leasure	Republican	
124th	Francis J. Boland Jr.*	Republican	
125th	Constance E. Cook*	Republican	
126th	L. Richard Marshall*	Republican	
127th	Charles D. Henderson*	Republican	
128th	Frederick L. Warder*	Republican	
129th	Joseph C. Finley*	Republican	
130th	Donald C. Shoemaker*	Rep./Cons.	
131st	Raymond J. Lill	Democrat	
132nd	S. William Rosenberg*	Republican	
133rd	Frank A. Carroll	Republican	
134th	Charles F. Stockmeister*	Democrat	Chairman of Conservation
135th	Don W. Cook	Republican	
136th	James L. Emery*	Republican	
137th	V. Sumner Carroll*	Republican	
138th	Gregory J. Pope*	Dem./Cons.	Chairman of Internal Affairs
139th	Lloyd J. Long*	Republican	
140th	James T. McFarland*	Rep./Cons.	
141st	Chester R. Hardt*	Republican	
142nd	Stephen R. Greco*	Democrat	Chairman of Pensions
143rd	Arthur O. Eve	Democrat	
144th	Albert J. Hausbeck*	Democrat	Chairman of Affairs of Villages
145th	John B. Lis*	Democrat	Chairman of Motor Vehicles
146th	Francis J. Griffin*	Democrat	Chairman of Canals and Waterways
147th	Dorothy H. Rose*	Dem./Lib.	
148th	Frank Walkley*	Republican	
149th	Lloyd A. Russell	Republican	
150th	Jess J. Present*	Republican	

=== Employees ===
- Clerk: John T. McKennan

== Sources ==
- 1967 Legislature in State Split Down Middle Politically; State Assembly Candidates Who Won Yesterday's Vote; NY Senate Has 31 GOP, 26 Demos in the Tonawanda News, of Tonawanda, on November 9, 1966
- Travia Gets Power Post In Assembly in the Tonawanda News, of Tonawanda, on January 5, 1967
- Members of the New York Senate (1960s) at Political Graveyard
- Members of the New York Assembly (1960s) at Political Graveyard
