= 176th New York State Legislature =

New York state legislative session

| ← | 175th | 177th | → |
- New York State Capitol (2009)

Overview
- Legislative body: New York State Legislature
- Jurisdiction: New York, United States
- Term: January 1 – December 31, 1966

Senate
- Members: 65
- President: Lt. Gov. Malcolm Wilson (R)
- Temporary President: Earl W. Brydges (R)
- Party control: Republican (37–28)

Assembly
- Members: 165
- Speaker: Anthony J. Travia (D)
- Party control: Democratic (90–75)

Sessions
- 1st: January 5 – July 6, 1966

The 176th New York State Legislature, consisting of the New York State Senate and the New York State Assembly, met from January 5 to July 6, 1966, during the eighth year of Nelson Rockefeller's governorship, in Albany.

== Background ==
Under the provisions of the New York Constitution of 1938, re-apportioned in 1953, 58 Senators and 150 assemblymen were elected in single-seat districts for two-year terms. The senatorial districts consisted either of one or more entire counties; or a contiguous area within a single county. The Assembly districts consisted either of a single entire county (except Hamilton Co.), or of contiguous area within one county.

In 1964, the U.S. Supreme Court handed down several decisions establishing that State legislatures should follow the One man, one vote rule to apportion their election districts. A special Federal Statutory Court declared the New York apportionment formulae for both the State Senate and the State Assembly unconstitutional, and the State Legislature was ordered to re-apportion the seats by April 1, 1965. The court also ruled that the 1964 legislative election should be held under the 1954 apportionment, but those elected could serve only for one year (in 1965), and an election under the new apportionment should be held in November 1965. Senators John H. Hughes and Lawrence M. Rulison (both Rep.) questioned the authority of the federal court to shorten the term of the 1964 electees, alleging excessive costs for the additional election in an off-year.

The lame-duck Legislature of 1964 met for a special session at the State Capitol in Albany from December 15 to 31, 1964, to re-apportion the legislative districts for the election in November 1965, gerrymandering the districts according to the wishes of the Republican majority before the Democrats would take over the Legislature in January. The number of seats in the State Senate was increased to 65, and the number of seats in the Assembly to 165. County representation was abandoned in favor of population-proportional districts, and the new Assembly districts were numbered from 1 to 165.

On February 1, 1965, the United States Supreme Court confirmed the Federal Statutory Court's order to elect a new New York Legislature in November 1965.

On April 14, 1965, the New York Court of Appeals declared the apportionment of December 1964 as unconstitutional, citing that the New York Constitution provides expressly that the Assembly shall have 150 seats, not 165 as were apportioned. The court also held that, although the constitutional State Senate apportionment formula provides for additional seats, the increase from 58 to 65 was unwarranted.

On May 10, the Federal Statutory Court ordered that the election on November 2, 1965, be held under the December 1964 apportionment, and that the Legislature thus elected re-apportion the seats again by February 1, 1966.

On August 24, it was clarified that, if the Governor and Legislature should not have enacted a new apportionment by February 1, 1966, then the courts should draft a new apportionment for the next election.

On October 11, the U.S. Supreme Court dismissed four appeals against the ruling of the Federal Statutory Court, and upheld the election of a new New York Legislature on November 2.

At this time there were two major political parties: the Democratic Party and the Republican Party. The Liberal Party and the Conservative Party also nominated tickets.

== Elections ==
The 1965 New York state election, was held on November 2. The only statewide elective office up for election was a seat on the New York Court of Appeals. Republican Kenneth B. Keating defeated Democrat/Liberal Owen McGivern and Conservative Henry S. Middendorf Jr. The approximate party strength at this election, as expressed by the vote for Judge of the Court of Appeals, was: Republicans 3,106,000; Democrats 1,824,000; Liberals 208,000; and Conservatives 207,000.

Three of the five women members of the previous legislature—Assemblywomen Shirley Chisholm (Dem.), a preschool teacher of Brooklyn; Constance E. Cook (Rep.), a lawyer of Ithaca; and Dorothy H. Rose (Dem.), a high-school teacher and librarian of Angola—were re-elected. Gail Hellenbrand (Dem.), of Brooklyn, was also elected to the Assembly.

== Sessions ==
The Legislature met for the regular session (the 189th) at the State Capitol in Albany on January 5, 1966; and adjourned on July 6.

Anthony J. Travia (Dem.) was re-elected Speaker.

Earl W. Brydges (Rep.) was elected Temporary President of the State Senate.

On January 14, the New York Court of Appeals moved the deadline for the new legislative apportionment from February 1 to February 15.

On February 23, the Court of Appeal appointed a commission of five members to map out new districts because the Republican-majority Senate and the Democratic-majority Assembly could not agree on a new apportionment. The commission was chaired by President-elect of the American Bar Association Orison S. Marden, of Scarsdale, who was not affiliated with any party and was deemed politically independent. The other members were Ex-Judges of the Court of Appeals Bruce Bromley (Rep.), of Manhattan, and Charles W. Froessel (Dem.), of Queens; Ex-Republican State Chairman Edwin F. Jaeckle, of Buffalo; and Robert B. Brady (Dem.), the Counsel to the Joint Legislative Committee on Re-Apportionment.

On March 14, the apportionment draft was submitted to the Court of Appeals.

On March 22, the Court of Appeals accepted the apportionment as drafted, thus becoming the law, without the need of legislative approval. The number of seats in the State Senate was reduced to 57, and the number of seats in the Assembly to 150.

== State Senate ==
=== Senators ===
The asterisk (*) denotes members of the previous Legislature who continued in office as members of this Legislature. Jerome Schutzer, Anthony B. Gioffre, Theodore D. Day and James F. Hastings changed from the Assembly to the Senate at the beginning of the session. Assemblyman William J. Ferrall was elected to fill a vacancy in the Senate.

Note: For brevity, the chairmanships omit the words "...the Committee on (the)..."

| District | Senator | Party | Notes |
|---|---|---|---|
| 1st | Leon E. Giuffreda | Republican | |
| 2nd | Bernard C. Smith | Republican | |
| 3rd | Elisha T. Barrett* | Republican | died on May 8, 1966 |
| 4th | Henry M. Curran* | Republican | |
| 5th | Edward J. Speno* | Republican | |
| 6th | Norman F. Lent* | Republican | |
| 7th | John R. Dunne | Republican | |
| 8th | John D. Caemmerer | Republican | |
| 9th | Murray Schwartz | Democrat | |
| 10th | Irving Mosberg* | Democrat | |
| 11th | Jack E. Bronston* | Democrat | |
| 12th | Nicholas Ferraro | Democrat | |
| 13th | Seymour R. Thaler* | Democrat | |
| 14th | Thomas J. Mackell* | Democrat | on November 8, 1966, elected D.A. of Queens Co. |
| 15th | Martin J. Knorr | Republican | |
| 16th | William Rosenblatt* | Democrat | |
| 17th | James H. Shaw Jr. | Dem./Lib. | |
| 18th | Simon J. Liebowitz* | Democrat | |
| 19th | William C. Thompson* | Democrat | |
| 20th | Edward S. Lentol* | Democrat | |
| 21st | Jeremiah B. Bloom* | Democrat | |
| 22nd | Samuel L. Greenberg* | Democrat | |
| 23rd | Irwin Brownstein* | Democrat | on November 8, 1966, elected to the New York City Civil Court |
| 24th | vacant | Senator-elect Guy James Mangano (D) was appointed to the Family Court in December 1965 | |
| 24th | William J. Ferrall* | Democrat | on February 8, 1966, elected to fill vacancy |
| 25th | William T. Conklin* | Republican | |
| 26th | John J. Marchi* | Republican | |
| 27th | Paul P. E. Bookson* | Democrat | |
| 28th | Whitney North Seymour Jr. | Republican | |
| 29th | Manfred Ohrenstein* | Democrat | |
| 30th | Jerome L. Wilson* | Democrat | |
| 31st | Basil A. Paterson | Democrat | |
| 32nd | Joseph Zaretzki* | Democrat | Minority Leader |
| 33rd | Jerome Schutzer* | Democrat | |
| 34th | Harrison J. Goldin | Dem./Lib. | |
| 35th | Dennis R. Coleman | Democrat | |
| 36th | Abraham Bernstein* | Dem./Lib. | |
| 37th | Archie A. Gorfinkel | Democrat | |
| 38th | John D. Calandra | Rep./Cons. | |
| 39th | Anthony B. Gioffre* | Republican | |
| 40th | Christian H. Armbruster | Republican | |
| 41st | Bernard G. Gordon* | Republican | |
| 42nd | D. Clinton Dominick III* | Republican | |
| 43rd | Lloyd A. Newcombe | Republican | |
| 44th | Robert Watson Pomeroy* | Republican | |
| 45th | Julian B. Erway* | Democrat | |
| 46th | Robert E. Lynch | Republican | |
| 47th | Nathan Proller* | Republican | |
| 48th | Ronald B. Stafford | Republican | |
| 49th | Dalwin J. Niles* | Republican | |
| 50th | Hugh Douglas Barclay* | Republican | |
| 51st | James H. Donovan | Republican | |
| 52nd | Tarky Lombardi Jr. | Republican | |
| 53rd | John H. Hughes* | Republican | Chairman of Judiciary |
| 54th | Theodore D. Day* | Republican | |
| 55th | Warren M. Anderson* | Republican | Chairman of Finance |
| 56th | William T. Smith* | Republican | |
| 57th | Thomas Laverne* | Republican | |
| 58th | Frank E. Van Lare* | Republican | |
| 59th | Kenneth R. Willard* | Republican | |
| 60th | Earl W. Brydges* | Republican | elected Temporary President |
| 61st | William E. Adams | Republican | |
| 62nd | Thomas F. McGowan | Republican | |
| 63rd | Frank J. Glinski* | Democrat | |
| 64th | Bertrand H. Hoak* | Democrat | |
| 65th | James F. Hastings* | Republican | |

=== Employees ===
- Secretary: Albert J. Abrams

== State Assembly ==
=== Assemblymen ===
The asterisk (*) denotes members of the previous Legislature who continued in office as members of this Legislature.

Note: For brevity, the chairmanships omit the words "...the Committee on (the)..."

| District | Assemblymen | Party | Notes |
|---|---|---|---|
| 1st | Perry B. Duryea Jr.* | Republican | Minority Leader |
| 2nd | Peter J. Costigan | Republican | |
| 3rd | Charles J. Melton | Democrat | |
| 4th | Prescott B. Huntington* | Rep./Cons. | |
| 5th | Richard DiNapoli | Republican | |
| 6th | John G. McCarthy* | Republican | |
| 7th | William L. Burns | Republican | |
| 8th | Francis P. McCloskey | Republican | |
| 9th | Martin Ginsberg | Rep./Lib. | |
| 10th | Stanley Harwood | Dem./Lib. | |
| 11th | Joseph M. Reilly | Republican | |
| 12th | Milton Jonas | Republican | |
| 13th | Arthur J. Kremer | Dem./Lib. | |
| 14th | John S. Thorp Jr.* | Dem./Lib. | |
| 15th | Joseph M. Margiotta | Republican | |
| 16th | John E. Kingston* | Republican | |
| 17th | Abe Seldin | Republican | |
| 18th | George J. Farrell Jr. | Republican | |
| 19th | Robert M. Blakeman | Republican | |
| 20th | Eli Wager | Democrat | |
| 21st | J. Lewis Fox* | Dem./Lib. | Chairman of Public Service |
| 22nd | Kenneth N. Browne* | Dem./Lib. | |
| 23rd | Robert J. Hall | Rep./Cons. | |
| 24th | Moses M. Weinstein* | Dem./Lib. | Majority Leader |
| 25th | Frederick D. Schmidt* | Democrat | |
| 26th | Leonard P. Stavisky | Dem./Lib. | |
| 27th | John T. Gallagher | Republican | |
| 28th | Martin Rodell* | Dem./Lib. | |
| 29th | Joseph J. Kunzeman | Republican | |
| 30th | Herbert J. Miller | Democrat | |
| 31st | Alfred D. Lerner | Rep./Cons. | |
| 32nd | Stanley J. Pryor | Dem./Lib. | |
| 33rd | Jules G. Sabbatino* | Democrat | Chairman of Commerce and Navigation |
| 34th | Thomas V. LaFauci* | Dem./Lib. | Chairman of Civil Service |
| 35th | Sidney Lebowitz | Dem./Lib. | |
| 36th | Thomas P. Cullen* | Dem./Lib. | |
| 37th | Joel R. Birnhak | Democrat | |
| 38th | Anthony J. Travia* | Dem./Lib. | re-elected Speaker |
| 39th | Samuel D. Wright | Democrat | |
| 40th | Alfred A. Lama* | Dem./Lib. | Chairman of Banks |
| 41st | Leonard E. Yoswein* | Dem./Lib. | Chairman of Charitable and Religious Institutions |
| 42nd | Lawrence P. Murphy* | Dem./Lib. | Chairman of Mortgage and Real Estate |
| 43rd | Max M. Turshen* | Dem./Lib. | Chairman of Judiciary |
| 44th | Stanley Steingut* | Democrat | Chairman of General Laws |
| 45th | Shirley Chisholm* | Dem./Lib. | |
| 46th | Bertram L. Baker* | Dem./Lib. | Majority Whip; Chairman of Education |
| 47th | Joseph R. Corso* | Dem./Lib. | Chairman of Codes |
| 48th | Edward A. Kurmel* | Democrat | |
| 49th | Harold W. Cohn* | Dem./Lib. | Chairman of Internal Affairs |
| 50th | Gilbert Ramirez | Democrat | |
| 51st | Gail Hellenbrand | Democrat | |
| 52nd | George A. Cincotta* | Dem./Lib. | Chairman of Excise |
| 53rd | Bertram L. Podell* | Democrat | Chairman of Local Finance |
| 54th | Noah Goldstein* | Democrat | Chairman of Canals and Waterways |
| 55th | Herbert H. Marker | Democrat | |
| 56th | Salvatore J. Grieco* | Democrat | |
| 57th | Louis Kalish* | Democrat | Chairman of Insurance |
| 58th | Joseph Kottler* | Democrat | Chairman of Penal Institutions |
| 59th | Dominick L. DiCarlo* | Republican | |
| 60th | Robert F. Kelly* | Republican | |
| 61st | James H. Tully Jr. | Democrat | |
| 62nd | William J. Ferrall* | Democrat | resigned on January 6, 1966, to run for the State Senate |
| 62nd | William J. Giordano | Democrat | on February 8, 1966, elected to fill vacancy; result certified on February 21 |
| 63rd | Joseph J. Dowd* | Democrat | Chairman of Printed and Engrossed Bills |
| 64th | Lucio F. Russo* | Republican | |
| 65th | Edward J. Amann Jr.* | Republican | |
| 66th | Louis DeSalvio* | Democrat | Chairman of Military Affairs |
| 67th | Jerome W. Marks* | Democrat | |
| 68th | Jerome Kretchmer* | Democrat | |
| 69th | William F. Passannante* | Democrat | Chairman of Claims |
| 70th | Paul J. Curran* | Republican | on December 23, 1966, appointed as NYC Legislative Representative |
| 71st | John M. Burns* | Republican | |
| 72nd | S. William Green* | Republican | |
| 73rd | Albert H. Blumenthal* | Democrat | Chairman of Health |
| 74th | Daniel M. Kelly* | Democrat | Chairman of Taxation |
| 75th | Jose Ramos-Lopez* | Democrat | Chairman of Aviation |
| 76th | Frank G. Rossetti* | Democrat | Chairman of Labor and Industries |
| 77th | Percy E. Sutton* | Democrat | on September 13, 1966, elected Borough President of Manhattan |
| 78th | David Dinkins | Democrat | |
| 79th | Mark T. Southall* | Democrat | |
| 80th | Orest V. Maresca* | Democrat | Chairman of Affairs of the City of New York |
| 81st | John J. Walsh* | Democrat | Chairman of Public Institutions |
| 82nd | Kenneth J. Lyman | Democrat | died on July 28, 1966 |
| 83rd | Robert García | Democrat | |
| 84th | Herbert J. Feuer | Democrat | |
| 85th | Seymour Posner* | Dem./Lib. | |
| 86th | Edward A. Stevenson, Sr. | Democrat | |
| 87th | Salvatore R. Almeida | Democrat | |
| 88th | Alexander Chananau* | Dem./Lib. | Chairman of Cities |
| 89th | Robert Abrams | Dem./Lib. | |
| 90th | Melville E. Abrams* | Democrat | Chairman of Social Welfare; died on October 10, 1966 |
| 91st | Burton Hecht* | Dem./Lib. | |
| 92nd | Anthony J. Stella | Dem./Lib. | |
| 93rd | Anthony J. Mercorella | Dem./Lib. | |
| 94th | Ferdinand J. Mondello* | Democrat | Chairman of Revision |
| 95th | Benjamin Altman | Dem./Lib. | |
| 96th | Alvin M. Suchin | Republican | |
| 97th | Gordon W. Burrows | Republican | |
| 98th | Thomas J. McInerney* | Democrat | |
| 99th | George E. Van Cott* | Republican | |
| 100th | Joseph R. Pisani | Republican | |
| 101st | Warren J. Sinsheimer | Republican | |
| 102nd | Richard A. Cerosky* | Republican | |
| 103rd | Peter R. Biondo | Republican | |
| 104th | Stephen G. Doig Jr. | Democrat | |
| 105th | Joseph T. St. Lawrence* | Democrat | |
| 106th | Daniel Becker* | Republican | |
| 107th | Willis H. Stephens* | Republican | |
| 108th | Victor C. Waryas* | Democrat | |
| 109th | Kenneth L. Wilson* | Republican | |
| 110th | John S. McBride | Republican | |
| 111th | Clarence D. Lane* | Republican | |
| 112th | Harvey M. Lifset* | Democrat | Chairman of Ways and Means |
| 113th | Frank P. Cox* | Democrat | Chairman of Public Printing |
| 114th | Douglas Hudson | Republican | |
| 115th | Lawrence E. Corbett Jr.* | Republican | |
| 116th | John F. Kirvin* | Democrat | |
| 117th | Clark C. Wemple | Republican | |
| 118th | Stanley L. Van Rensselaer* | Republican | |
| 119th | Richard J. Bartlett* | Republican | Minority Whip |
| 120th | Louis Wolfe* | Democrat | |
| 121st | Verner M. Ingram* | Republican | |
| 122nd | Donald J. Mitchell* | Republican | |
| 123rd | Donald A. Campbell* | Republican | |
| 124th | Edwyn E. Mason* | Republican | |
| 125th | George L. Ingalls* | Republican | |
| 126th | Francis J. Boland Jr. | Republican | |
| 127th | Louis H. Folmer* | Republican | |
| 128th | Harold I. Tyler* | Republican | |
| 129th | William R. Sears | Republican | |
| 130th | Edward A. Hanna | Democrat | |
| 131st | Donald L. Taylor | Republican | |
| 132nd | Edward F. Crawford* | Republican | |
| 133rd | James J. Barry* | Democrat | |
| 134th | John H. Terry* | Republican | |
| 135th | Mortimer P. Gallivan | Democrat | |
| 136th | Philip R. Chase* | Republican | |
| 137th | George M. Michaels* | Democrat | Chairman of Agriculture |
| 138th | Constance E. Cook* | Republican | |
| 139th | L. Richard Marshall* | Republican | |
| 140th | Charles D. Henderson* | Republican | |
| 141st | Frederick L. Warder* | Republican | |
| 142nd | Joseph C. Finley* | Republican | |
| 143rd | Donald C. Shoemaker | Republican | |
| 144th | Hastings S. Morse Jr. | Republican | |
| 145th | S. William Rosenberg* | Republican | |
| 146th | James M. White | Republican | |
| 147th | James E. Powers | Democrat | |
| 148th | Charles F. Stockmeister* | Democrat | Chairman of Conservation |
| 149th | James L. Emery* | Republican | |
| 150th | Frank Walkley* | Republican | |
| 151st | V. Sumner Carroll | Republican | |
| 152nd | Gregory J. Pope* | Democrat | |
| 153rd | Lloyd J. Long | Republican | |
| 154th | James T. McFarland | Republican | |
| 155th | Chester R. Hardt | Republican | |
| 156th | Francis J. Griffin* | Democrat | |
| 157th | Arthur Hardwick Jr.* | Democrat | |
| 158th | Stephen R. Greco* | Democrat | Chairman of Pensions |
| 159th | Charles E. Hogg | Republican | |
| 160th | Albert J. Hausbeck* | Democrat | Chairman of Affairs of Villages |
| 161st | John B. Lis* | Democrat | Chairman of Motor Vehicles |
| 162nd | Julius Volker* | Republican | |
| 163rd | Dorothy H. Rose* | Democrat | |
| 164th | Jess J. Present | Republican | |
| 165th | A. Bruce Manley* | Republican | |

=== Employees ===
- Clerk: John T. McKennan

== Sources ==
- Speaker Of Assembly Names Lower House Committees in The Times Record, of Troy, on January 11, 1966
- Members of the New York Senate (1960s) at Political Graveyard
- Members of the New York Assembly (1960s) at Political Graveyard
