= 179th New York State Legislature =

New York state legislative session

←	178th	180th	→
- New York State Capitol (2009)

Overview
- Legislative body: New York State Legislature
- Jurisdiction: New York, United States
- Term: January 1, 1971 – December 31, 1972

Senate
- Members: 57
- President: Lt. Gov. Malcolm Wilson (R)
- Temporary President: Earl W. Brydges (R)
- Party control: Republican (32–25)

Assembly
- Members: 150
- Speaker: Perry B. Duryea Jr. (R)
- Party control: Republican (77–71–2)

Sessions
- 1st: January 6 – June 9, 1971
- 2nd: December 14 – 18, 1971
- 3rd: December 27, 1971 – January 4, 1972
- 4th: January 5 – May 12, 1972

The 179th New York State Legislature, consisting of the New York State Senate and the New York State Assembly, met from January 6, 1971, to May 12, 1972, during the thirteenth and fourteenth years of Nelson Rockefeller's governorship, in Albany.

== Background ==
Under the provisions of the New York Constitution of 1938, and the U.S. Supreme Court decision to follow the One man, one vote rule, re-apportioned in 1966 by order of the New York Court of Appeals, 57 Senators and 150 assemblymen were elected in single-seat districts for two-year terms. Senate and Assembly districts consisted of approximately the same number of inhabitants, the area being apportioned without restrictions regarding county boundaries.

At this time there were two major political parties: the Republican Party and the Democratic Party. The Conservative Party, the Liberal Party, the Communist Party, the Socialist Workers Party, the Socialist Labor Party, a "Civil Service Independent Party" and an "Independent Alliance" also nominated tickets.

== Elections ==
The 1970 New York state election was held on November 3. Governor Nelson Rockefeller and Lieutenant Governor Malcolm Wilson were re-elected, both Republicans. The elections to the other three statewide elective offices resulted in a Republican Attorney General with Liberal endorsement; a Democratic State Comptroller with Liberal endorsement; and a Conservative U.S. Senator with Independent Alliance endorsement. The approximate party strength at this election, as expressed by the vote for Governor, was: Republicans/C.S.I.P. 3,151,000; Democrats/Liberals 2,421,000; Conservatives 423,000; Communists 8,000; Socialist Workers 6,000; and Socialist Labor 4,000. However, Conservative James L. Buckley polled almost 2.3 million votes and was elected to the U.S. Senate.

Three of the four women members of the previous legislature—Assemblywomen Constance E. Cook (Rep.), a lawyer of Ithaca; Rosemary R. Gunning (Cons.), a lawyer of Ridgewood, Queens; and Mary Anne Krupsak (Dem.), a lawyer of Amsterdam—were re-elected.

The 1971 New York state election was held on November 2. No statewide elective offices were up for election. Two vacancies in the State Senate and four vacancies in the Assembly were filled.

== Sessions ==
The Legislature met for the first regular session (the 194th) at the State Capitol in Albany on January 6, 1971; and adjourned sine die on June 9.

Perry B. Duryea Jr. (Rep.) was re-elected Speaker.

Earl W. Brydges (Rep.) was re-elected Temporary President of the State Senate.

The Legislature met for a special session at the State Capitol in Albany on December 14, 1971; and adjourned sine die on December 18. This session was called to enact a new apportionment of the state's legislative districts.

The Legislature met for another special session at the State Capitol in Albany on December 27, 1971; and adjourned sine die on January 4, 1972. This session was called to consider measures to balance the state's finances, and ended with the enactment of tax increases.

The Legislature met for the second regular session (the 195th) at the State Capitol in Albany on January 5, 1972; and adjourned sine die on May 12.

On May 9, the Assembly passed a bill to repeal the permissive 1970 abortion law. The bill also passed the Senate, but was vetoed by Governor Rockefeller.

== State Senate ==
=== Senators ===
The asterisk (*) denotes members of the previous Legislature who continued in office as members of this Legislature. Assemblymen William J. Giordano and Emanuel R. Gold were elected to fill a vacancies in the Senate.

Note: For brevity, the chairmanships omit the words "...the Committee on (the)..."

District	Senator	Party	Notes
1st	Leon E. Giuffreda*	Republican	
2nd	Bernard C. Smith*	Republican	
3rd	Ralph J. Marino*	Republican	
4th	Edward J. Speno*	Republican	died on February 17, 1971
4th	George A. Murphy	Republican	on November 2, 1971, elected to fill vacancy
5th	John D. Caemmerer*	Rep./Cons.	
6th	John R. Dunne*	Republican	
7th	Norman J. Levy	Rep./Cons.	
8th	Murray Schwartz*	Dem./Lib.	
9th	Jack E. Bronston*	Dem./Lib.	
10th	Seymour R. Thaler*	Dem./Lib.	resigned to run for the New York Supreme Court
10th	Emanuel R. Gold*	Dem./Lib.	on November 2, 1971, elected to fill vacancy
11th	John J. Santucci*	Democrat	
12th	Martin J. Knorr*	Rep./Cons.	
13th	Nicholas Ferraro*	Democrat	
14th	Edward S. Lentol*	Democrat	on November 7, 1972, elected to the New York Supreme Court
15th	A. Frederick Meyerson*	Dem./Lib.	
16th	Donald Halperin	Democrat	
17th	Jeremiah B. Bloom*	Democrat	
18th	Waldaba Stewart*	Dem./Lib.	
19th	Samuel L. Greenberg*	Dem./Lib.	
20th	Albert B. Lewis*	Democrat	
21st	William T. Conklin*	Rep./Cons.	
22nd	vacant		Senator-elect William J. Ferrall (D) died on December 13, 1970
22nd	William J. Giordano*	Democrat	on February 9, 1971, elected to fill vacancy
23rd	John J. Marchi*	Rep./Cons.	
24th	Paul P. E. Bookson*	Democrat	
25th	Manfred Ohrenstein*	Dem./Lib.	
26th	Roy M. Goodman*	Rep./Lib.	
27th	Sidney A. von Luther	Democrat	
28th	Joseph Zaretzki*	Dem./Lib.	Minority Leader
29th	Robert García*	Dem./Rep./Lib.	
30th	Harrison J. Goldin*	Dem./Lib.	
31st	Joseph L. Galiber*	Dem./Rep./Lib.	
32nd	Abraham Bernstein*	Dem./Lib.	
33rd	John D. Calandra*	Rep./Cons.	
34th	John E. Flynn*	Republican	
35th	Anthony B. Gioffre*	Rep./Cons.	
36th	Bernard G. Gordon*	Rep./Cons.	
37th	Richard E. Schermerhorn	Rep./Cons.	
38th	Jay P. Rolison Jr.*	Rep./Cons.	
39th	Douglas Hudson*	Rep./Cons.	
40th	Walter B. Langley*	Republican	
41st	Dalwin J. Niles*	Rep./Cons.	
42nd	Ronald B. Stafford*	Rep./Dem./Cons./Lib.	
43rd	Hugh Douglas Barclay*	Rep./Cons.	
44th	James H. Donovan*	Rep./Cons.	
45th	John H. Hughes*	Republican	Chairman of Judiciary; died on October 13, 1972
46th	Tarky Lombardi Jr.*	Rep./Cons.	
47th	Warren M. Anderson*	Republican	Chairman of Finance
48th	William T. Smith*	Rep./Cons.	
49th	Theodore D. Day*	Rep./Cons.	on July 1, appointed as Asst. NYS Commissioner of Agriculture and Markets
50th	Thomas Laverne*	Rep./Lib.	
51st	James E. Powers*	Democrat	
52nd	Earl W. Brydges*	Republican	re-elected Temporary President
53rd	John J. LaFalce	Dem./Lib.	
54th	Thomas F. McGowan*	Rep./Lib.	
55th	Frank J. Glinski*	Dem./Lib.	
56th	James D. Griffin*	Democrat	
57th	Jess J. Present*	Republican	

=== Employees ===
- Secretary: Albert J. Abrams

== State Assembly ==
=== Assembly members ===
The asterisk (*) denotes members of the previous Legislature who continued in office as members of this Legislature.

Note: For brevity, the chairmanships omit the words "...the Committee on (the)..."

District	Assembly member	Party	Notes
1st	Perry B. Duryea Jr.*	Republican	re-elected Speaker
2nd	Peter J. Costigan*	Rep./Cons.	
3rd	Charles A. Jerabek*	Cons./Rep.	
4th	Robert C. Wertz	Republican	
5th	William L. Burns*	Republican	
6th	John G. McCarthy*	Republican	
7th	Joseph M. Reilly*	Republican	
8th	Martin Ginsberg*	Republican	
9th	Philip B. Healey	Rep./Cons.	
10th	Milton Jonas*	Republican	
11th	Stanley Harwood*	Dem./Lib.	
12th	Joseph M. Margiotta*	Republican	
13th	John S. Thorp Jr.*	Dem./Lib.	
14th	Arthur J. Kremer*	Dem./Lib.	
15th	Eli Wager*	Dem./Lib.	
16th	George J. Farrell Jr.*	Rep./Cons.	
17th	John E. Kingston*	Republican	Majority Leader
18th	Irwin J. Landes	Dem./Lib.	
19th	Herbert A. Posner*	Democrat	
20th	Joseph J. Kunzeman*	Rep./Cons.	resigned to run for the New York Supreme Court
20th	John A. Esposito	Rep./Cons.	on November 2, 1971, elected to fill vacancy
21st	Martin Rodell*	Dem./Lib.	resigned to run for the New York City Civil Court
21st	Saul Weprin	Dem./Lib.	on November 2, 1971, elected to fill vacancy
22nd	John T. Gallagher*	Rep./Cons.	
23rd	Leonard P. Stavisky*	Dem./Lib.	
24th	Arthur J. Cooperman*	Dem./Lib.	
25th	Emanuel R. Gold*	Dem./Lib.	resigned to run for the State Senate
25th	Alan G. Hevesi	Dem./Lib.	on November 2, 1971, elected to fill vacancy
26th	Guy R. Brewer*	Democrat	
27th	Herbert J. Miller*	Democrat	
28th	Alfred D. Lerner*	Rep./Cons.	resigned to run for the New York Supreme Court
28th	Alfred A. DelliBovi	Republican	on November 2, 1971, elected to fill vacancy
29th	Frederick D. Schmidt*	Democrat	
30th	John T. Flack*	Rep./Cons.	
31st	Joseph F. Lisa*	Democrat	
32nd	John G. Lopresto	Rep./Cons.	
33rd	Joseph S. Calabretta*	Democrat	
34th	Rosemary R. Gunning*	Cons./Rep.	
35th	Chester J. Straub*	Democrat	
36th	Peter G. Mirto*	Democrat	
37th	Samuel D. Wright*	Democrat	
38th	Vito P. Battista*	Rep./Cons.	
39th	Stanley Fink*	Democrat	
40th	Alfred A. Lama*	Dem./Lib.	
41st	Stanley Steingut*	Democrat	Minority Leader
42nd	Brian Sharoff	Democrat	
43rd	George A. Cincotta*	Democrat	
44th	Mel Miller	Democrat	
45th	Stephen J. Solarz*	Democrat	
46th	Leonard M. Simon*	Dem./Lib.	
47th	Salvatore J. Grieco*	Democrat	
48th	Leonard Silverman*	Democrat	
49th	Dominick L. DiCarlo*	Rep./Cons.	
50th	Robert F. Kelly*	Rep./Cons.	
51st	Vincent A. Riccio*	Rep./Cons.	
52nd	Joseph M. Martuscello	Democrat	
53rd	(William J. Giordano)*	Democrat	resigned on January 6, 1971, to run for the State Senate
53rd	Frank J. Verderame	Democrat	on February 9, 1971, elected to fill vacancy
54th	Vander L. Beatty	Democrat	
55th	Thomas R. Fortune*	Democrat	
56th	Calvin Williams	Democrat	
57th	Harvey L. Strelzin*	Democrat	
58th	Lucio F. Russo*	Rep./Cons.	
59th	Edward J. Amann Jr.*	Rep./Cons.	
60th	Louis DeSalvio*	Democrat	
61st	Anthony G. DiFalco*	Dem./Lib.	
62nd	Andrew J. Stein	Dem./Lib.	
63rd	William F. Passannante*	Dem./Lib.	
64th	Peter A. A. Berle*	Dem./Lib.	
65th	Richard N. Gottfried	Democrat	
66th	Antonio G. Olivieri	Dem./Lib.	
67th	Albert H. Blumenthal*	Dem./Lib.	
68th	Frank G. Rossetti*	Dem./Lib.	
69th	Franz S. Leichter*	Dem./Lib.	
70th	Hulan E. Jack*	Democrat	on April 24, 1972, convicted of conspiracy
71st	Stephen S. Gottlieb*	Democrat	
72nd	George W. Miller	Democrat	
73rd	John J. Walsh*	Ind. Dem.	
74th	Mark T. Southall*	Democrat	
75th	Harry Kraf*	Democrat	on November 7, 1972, elected to the New York City Civil Court
76th	Seymour Posner*	Dem./Lib.	
77th	Armando Montano*	Dem./Lib.	
78th	Louis Niñé	Democrat	
79th	Manuel Ramos*	Democrat	
80th	Ferdinand J. Mondello*	Democrat	on October 12, 1972, appointed to the NYS Commission of Investigation
81st	Alan Hochberg*	Dem./Lib.	
82nd	Alexander Chananau*	Dem./Lib.	
83rd	Burton Hecht*	Dem./Lib.	
84th	G. Oliver Koppell*	Dem./Lib.	
85th	Anthony J. Mercorella*	Dem./Lib.	
86th	Anthony J. Stella*	Dem./Lib.	
87th	Thomas J. McInerney*	Democrat	
88th	George E. Van Cott*	Rep./Cons.	
89th	Alvin M. Suchin*	Rep./Cons.	
90th	Gordon W. Burrows*	Republican	
91st	Joseph R. Pisani*	Republican	
92nd	J. Edward Meyer	Republican	
93rd	Peter R. Biondo*	Republican	
94th	Eugene Levy*	Rep./Cons.	
95th	Benjamin A. Gilman*	Rep./Cons.	on November 7, 1972, elected to the 93rd U.S. Congress
96th	Lawrence Herbst	Rep./Cons.	
97th	Willis H. Stephens*	Rep./Cons.	Chairman of Ways and Means
98th	Emeel S. Betros*	Rep./Cons.	
99th	H. Clark Bell*	Rep./Cons.	
100th	Clarence D. Lane*	Republican	
101st	Neil W. Kelleher*	Rep./Cons.	
102nd	Thomas W. Brown	Democrat	
103rd	Fred G. Field Jr.*	Republican	
104th	Mary Anne Krupsak*	Dem./Lib.	
105th	Clark C. Wemple*	Rep./Cons.	
106th	Fred W. Droms Jr.*	Rep./Cons.	
107th	Lawrence E. Corbett Jr.*	Republican	
108th	Andrew W. Ryan Jr.*	Rep./Cons.	
109th	Glenn H. Harris*	Rep./Cons.	
110th	K. Daniel Haley	Dem./Lib.	
111th	Donald L. Taylor*	Republican	
112th	Donald J. Mitchell*	Republican	on November 7, 1972, elected to the 93rd U.S. Congress
113th	Edwyn E. Mason*	Rep./Cons.	
114th	Richard A. Brown*	Republican	
115th	William R. Sears*	Rep./Cons.	
116th	John T. Buckley*	Rep./Lib.	
117th	Edward F. Crawford*	Rep./Cons.	Chairman of Judiciary
118th	Leonard F. Bersani*	Rep./Cons.	
119th	Hyman M. Miller	Republican	
120th	Edward M. Kinsella	Rep./Cons.	
121st	Thomas J. Murphy	Republican	
122nd	Lloyd Stephen Riford Jr.	Republican	
123rd	Kenneth S. Leasure*	Republican	
124th	Francis J. Boland Jr.*	Rep./Cons.	
125th	Constance E. Cook*	Republican	
126th	L. Richard Marshall*	Rep./Cons.	
127th	Charles D. Henderson*	Rep./Cons.	
128th	Frederick L. Warder*	Republican	
129th	Joseph C. Finley*	Rep./Cons.	
130th	Donald C. Shoemaker*	Republican	
131st	Raymond J. Lill*	Dem./Lib.	
132nd	S. William Rosenberg*	Republican	
133rd	Frank A. Carroll*	Rep./Cons.	
134th	William M. Steinfeldt*	Republican	
135th	Don W. Cook*	Republican	
136th	James L. Emery*	Republican	
137th	V. Sumner Carroll*	Rep./Cons.	
138th	Richard J. Hogan	Republican	
139th	Michael L. McCarthy	Democrat	
140th	James T. McFarland*	Rep./Cons.	
141st	Chester R. Hardt*	Rep./Cons.	
142nd	Stephen R. Greco*	Dem./Lib.	
143rd	Arthur O. Eve*	Dem./Lib.	
144th	Albert J. Hausbeck*	Rep./Cons.	
145th	John B. Lis*	Dem./Lib.	
146th	Francis J. Griffin*	Democrat	
147th	Ronald H. Tills*	Rep./Cons.	
148th	Frank Walkley*	Republican	on July 1, took office as NYS Commissioner of Agriculture and Markets
149th	Lloyd A. Russell*	Rep./Cons.	
150th	John W. Beckman*	Rep./Cons.	

=== Employees ===
- Clerk: Donald A. Campbell

== Sources ==
- YOUR HELP NEEDED NOW ON ABORTION LEGISLATION! campaign pamphlet issued by NYALR (a member of COFAR [i.e. the Coalition of Organizations for Abortion Rights])
