= Dorothy Rose =

Dorothy Rose may refer to:

- Dot Rose (born 1938), Canadian curler and softball player
- Dorothy H. Rose (1920–2005), American politician from New York
