= Stuart Levine =

Stuart Levine may refer to:

- Stuart Levine (academic) (1932–2016), American academic
- Stuart R. Levine (born 1947), American politician
