= James E. Powers =

American politician (1931–2020)

James E. Powers (May 30, 1931 – August 5, 2020) was an American politician from New York.

== Life and career ==
James E. Powers was born on May 30, 1931, in Chicago, Illinois. He graduated B.Sc. from Northern Illinois University, and M.A. in labor and industrial relations from the University of Illinois. He taught at East High School, in Rochester, New York from 1958 to 1966. He married Lucille Ann DeFrank. He entered politics as a Democrat.

Powers was a member of the New York State Assembly in 1965 and 1966.

Powers was a member of the New York State Senate from 1967 to 1972, sitting in the 177th, 178th and 179th New York State Legislatures. He was defeated in 1972 by Republican Fred Eckert.

Powers died on August 5, 2020, at the age of 89.

New York State Assembly
| Preceded by Paul B. Hanks, Jr. | New York State Assembly; Monroe County, 3rd District; 1965 | Succeeded by district abolished |
| Preceded by new district | New York State Assembly; 147th District; 1966 | Succeeded by Dorothy H. Rose |
New York State Senate
| Preceded by James H. Donovan | New York State Senate; 51st District; 1967–1972 | Succeeded by William T. Smith |
