= Leon E. Giuffreda =

American businessman and politician

Member of the New York State Senate from the 1st district
- In office January 1, 1966 – December 31, 1976
- Preceded by: Elisha T. Barrett
- Succeeded by: Kenneth LaValle

Personal details
- Born: July 1, 1913 Brooklyn, New York
- Died: November 8, 1999 (aged 86) Baca Raton, Florida
- Party: Republican

Leon E. Giuffreda (August 1, 1913 – November 8, 1999) was an American businessman and politician from New York.

== Life ==
He was born on August 1, 1913, in Brooklyn, New York City. In 1941, he moved to Centereach, in Suffolk County. There he engaged in the real estate and insurance business. He married Rose M. Gazzano (1913–2007), and they had two daughters.

Giuffreda was a member of the New York State Senate from 1966 to 1976, sitting in the 176th, 177th, 178th, 179th, 180th and 181st New York State Legislatures.

He died on November 8, 1999, in Boca Raton, Florida; and was buried at the Municipal Cemetery and Mausoleum there.

== Sources ==
New York State Senate
Preceded by Elisha T. Barrett	Member of the New York State Senate from the 1st district January 1, 1966 – December 31, 1976	Succeeded by Kenneth LaValle
