= Gail Hellenbrand =

American politician

Gail Hellenbrand (August 27, 1921 – December 29, 1996) was an American politician from New York.

== Early life and education ==
She was born Gail Abbey Ginsberg on August 27, 1921, in Brooklyn. She attended Manual Training High School and Spencer-Eastman Finishing School. On July 29, 1945, she married Julius A. Hellenbrand (1913-2015), later a Justice of the New York Supreme Court, and their only child was the scholar and academic administrator Harold Hellenbrand (born 1953).

== Career ==
Gail Hellenbrand was a member of the New York State Assembly from 1966 to 1970, sitting in the 176th, 177th and 178th New York State Legislatures.

She was a member of the New York State Temporary Commission on Regulation of Lobbying.

== Death ==
She died on December 29, 1996, in San Diego, California.

New York State Assembly
Preceded by new district	New York State Assembly; 51st District; 1966	Succeeded by Joseph S. Levine
Preceded by Noah Goldstein	New York State Assembly; 54th District; 1967–1970	Succeeded by Vander L. Beatty
