= Vander L. Beatty =

American politician

Member of the New York State Senate
- In office January 1, 1973 – December 31, 1982
- Preceded by: Waldaba Stewart
- Succeeded by: Joe Montalto
- Constituency: 18th district (1973-1974); 23rd district (1975-1982)

Member of the New York State Assembly for the 54th district
- In office January 1, 1971 – December 31, 1972
- Preceded by: Gail Hellenbrand
- Succeeded by: Samuel D. Wright

Personal details
- Born: February 5, 1941
- Died: August 30, 1990 (aged 49) Brooklyn, New York
- Party: Democratic

Vander L. Beatty (February 5, 1941 – August 30, 1990) was an American politician from New York.

== Life ==
Beatty was a member of the New York State Assembly (54th D.) in 1971 and 1972; and a member of the New York State Senate from 1973 to 1982, sitting in the 180th, 181st, 182nd, 183rd and 184th New York State Legislatures.

In 1982, he ran in the Democratic primary for Congress in the 12th District, but was defeated by Major Owens. Beatty then attempted to defraud the results of the primary, and was eventually convicted and sentenced to jail.

== Death ==
Beatty was murdered on August 30, 1990, at his campaign headquarters in Brooklyn while attempting a political come-back. The murder allegedly occurred after a judge refused to reduce Everett Flournoy's alimony and child support payments. Flournoy was represented at the hearing by a lawyer recommended by Beatty. Flournoy was apprehended after two appearances on the television program "America's Most Wanted".

New York State Assembly
Preceded by Gail Hellenbrand	New York State Assembly; 54th District; 1971–1972	Succeeded by Samuel D. Wright
New York State Senate
Preceded by Waldaba Stewart	New York State Senate; 18th District; 1973–1974	Succeeded by Chester J. Straub
Preceded by Carol Bellamy	New York State Senate; 23rd District; 1975–1982	Succeeded by Joseph G. Montalto
