= Murray Schwartz (politician) =

American politician

Member of the New York Senate
- In office January 1, 1966 – December 31, 1972
- Preceded by: Thomas J. Mackell
- Succeeded by: Frank Padavan (redistricting)
- Constituency: 9th district (1966); 8th district (1966-1972)

Personal details
- Born: August 14, 1919 Brooklyn, New York
- Died: October 5, 2001 (aged 83) Roslyn, New York
- Party: Democratic
- Spouse: Jeanette Jay
- Children: 2

Murray Schwartz (August 14, 1919 – October 5, 2001) was an American businessman and politician from New York.

== Life ==
He was born on August 14, 1919, in Brooklyn, New York City. He engaged in the distribution of heating oil, and owned several travel agencies. He married Jeanette Jay, and they had two children. They lived in Queens. He entered politics as a Democrat.

He was a member of the New York State Senate from 1966 to 1972, sitting in the 176th, 177th, 178th and 179th New York State Legislatures. He was defeated for reelection in 1972 by Republican Frank Padavan.

He was New York City Commissioner of Commerce and Industry from 1974 to 1975.

He died on October 5, 2001, at his summer home in Roslyn, New York. He was Jewish.

Songwriter Jack Lawrence (1912–2009) was his brother.

== Sources ==
New York State Senate
| Preceded by Thomas J. Mackell | New York State Senate; 9th District; 1966 | Succeeded by Jack E. Bronston |
| Preceded by John D. Caemmerer | New York State Senate; 8th District; 1967–1972 | Succeeded by Norman J. Levy |
