= Joseph Ferris =

American politician (1934–2020)

Member of the New York State Assembly from the 51st district
- In office January 1, 1975 – December 31, 1984
- Preceded by: Vincent A. Riccio
- Succeeded by: James F. Brennan

Personal details
- Born: October 10, 1934 Brooklyn, New York, U.S.
- Died: June 20, 2020 (aged 85) Brooklyn, New York, U.S.
- Party: Democratic

Joseph Ferris (October 10, 1934 – June 20, 2020) was an American politician who served in the New York State Assembly from the 51st district from 1975 to 1984.

Ferris died from COVID-19 during the COVID-19 pandemic in New York City on June 20, 2020, in Brooklyn, New York City, New York at age 85.
