= William M. Steinfeldt =

American engineer and politician (1917–2006)

William M. Steinfeldt (March 22, 1917 – September 4, 2006) was an American engineer and politician from New York.

== Life ==
He was born on March 22, 1917, in Rochester, New York. He graduated B.Sc. in chemical engineering from Purdue University in 1938.

He entered politics as a Republican.

He was a member of the New York State Assembly (134th D.) from 1970 to 1974, sitting in the 178th, 179th and 180th New York State Legislatures.

On April 20, 1982, he was elected to the New York State Senate, to fill the vacancy caused by the appointment of Fred J. Eckert as U.S. Ambassador to Fiji. Steinfeldt was re-elected in November 1982, and remained in the State Senate until 1984, sitting in the 184th and 185th New York State Legislatures. in November 1984, he ran for re-election, but was defeated by Democrat Ralph E. Quattrociocchi.

Steinfeldt died on September 4, 2006.

New York State Assembly
Preceded by Charles F. Stockmeister	New York State Assembly; 134th District; 1970–1974	Succeeded by Roger J. Robach
New York State Senate
Preceded by Fred J. Eckert	New York State Senate; 54th District; 1982	Succeeded by John D. Perry
Preceded by Anthony M. Masiello	New York State Senate; 55th District; 1983–1984	Succeeded by Ralph E. Quattrociocchi
