= Paul P. E. Bookson =

American politician

New York City Civil Court
- In office 1975–1995

New York State Senate
- In office 1965–1974

Personal details
- Born: January 25, 1933 New York City, New York, U.S.
- Died: September 22, 2005 (aged 72) New York City, New York, U.S.
- Party: Democratic Party
- Spouse: Tova Heller
- Children: 3

Paul P. E. Bookson (January 25, 1933 – September 22, 2005) was an American lawyer and politician from New York.

== Life ==
He was born on January 25, 1933, in New York City, the son of Leo Bookson and Anna Bookson. He practiced law in New York City, and entered politics as a Democrat. He married Tova Heller, and they had three daughters.

Bookson was a member of the New York State Senate from 1965 to 1974, sitting in the 175th, 176th, 177th, 178th, 179th and 180th New York State Legislatures. He was Chairman of the Committee on Agriculture in 1965.

In November 1975, he was elected to the New York City Civil Court, and was re-elected in 1985.

He was a member of the congregation of the Eldridge Street Synagogue, He was instrumental in achieving the restoration of the synagogue.

On September 22, 2005, Bookson was hit by a motorcyclist while crossing Adams Street in Brooklyn, and died from his injuries a few hours later in Bellevue Hospital Center in Manhattan.

== Sources ==
New York State Senate
Preceded by Joseph R. Marro	New York State Senate; 24th District; 1965	Succeeded by William J. Ferrall
Preceded by Ivan Warner	New York State Senate; 27th District; 1966	Succeeded by Basil A. Paterson
Preceded by William J. Ferrall	New York State Senate; 24th District; 1967–1972	Succeeded by John J. Marchi
Preceded by Manfred Ohrenstein	New York State Senate; 25th District; 1973–1974	Succeeded by Carol Bellamy
