= Edward F. Crawford (attorney) =

American lawyer and politician

Edward F. Crawford (January 1, 1919 – September 25, 1975) was an American lawyer and politician from upstate New York.

== Biography ==
Crawford was born on January 1, 1919, in Oswego, New York, the son of Edward F. Crawford and Mary Farley Crawford. He graduated B.A. from St. Michael's College, Toronto, in 1941, and LL.B. from Fordham Law School in 1945. He was admitted to the bar the same year, practiced law in Oswego, and entered politics as a Republican. He married Margaret M. Conlin, and they had two children.

Crawford was Oswego County Attorney from 1951 to 1956. He was a member of the New York State Assembly from 1957 to 1973, sitting in the 171st, 172nd, 173rd, 174th, 175th, 176th, 177th, 178th, 179th and 180th New York State Legislatures. He was a delegate to the New York State Constitutional Convention of 1967. In November 1973, he was elected to the New York Supreme Court (5th D.).

Crawford died on September 25, 1975, in Crouse Irving Memorial Hospital in Syracuse, New York, of cancer.

New York State Assembly
Preceded by Henry D. Coville	New York State Assembly; Oswego County; 1957–1965	Succeeded by district abolished
Preceded by new district	New York State Assembly; 132nd District; 1966	Succeeded by S. William Rosenberg
Preceded by Clark C. Wemple	New York State Assembly; 117th District; 1967–1973	Succeeded by Ralph Shapiro
