= Dalwin J. Niles =

American politician

Member of the New York State Senate
- In office 1965–1972
- Preceded by: Walter Van Wiggeren
- Succeeded by: Mary Anne Krupsak (redistricting)

Personal details
- Born: September 5, 1914 Schenectady, New York, U.S.
- Died: January 1979 (aged 64)
- Party: Republican
- Spouse: Mary Heagle
- Children: 2 sons
- Education: Union College; Albany Law School
- Occupation: Lawyer, politician

Military service
- Branch/service: United States Army
- Years of service: World War II
- Rank: Major

Dalwin J. Niles (September 5, 1914 – January 1979) was an American lawyer and politician from New York.

== Life ==
He was born on September 5, 1914, in Schenectady, New York. He graduated from Union College, and from Albany Law School in 1937. He was admitted to the bar in 1938, and in 1939 began to practice law in Johnstown, Fulton County, New York. He married Mary Heagle, and they had two sons. During World War II he served in the U.S. Army, attaining the rank of major.

He was the Judge of the Fulton County Children's Court (renamed Family Court in 1962) from 1953 to 1964. In June 1964, he defeated the incumbent State Senator Walter Van Wiggeren in the Republican primary. Van Wiggeren ran in November 1964 on the Conservative ticket for re-election, but was defeated again by Niles.

Niles was a member of the New York State Senate from 1965 to 1972, sitting in the 175th, 176th, 177th, 178th and 179th New York State Legislatures.

He died in January 1979.

== Sources ==
New York State Senate
| Preceded by Walter Van Wiggeren | New York State Senate; 41st District; 1965 | Succeeded by Bernard G. Gordon |
| Preceded by William T. Smith | New York State Senate; 49th District; 1966 | Succeeded by Theodore D. Day |
| Preceded by Bernard G. Gordon | New York State Senate; 41st District; 1967–1972 | Succeeded by Douglas Hudson |
