= William J. Giordano =

American politician

William J. Giordano (August 8, 1919 – March 1993) was an American lawyer and politician from New York.

== Life ==
He was born on August 8, 1919, in Brooklyn, New York City. He attended St. Francis Xavier Grammar School and St. Francis Prep School. He graduated A.B. from Mount St. Mary's College, and LL.B. from New York Law School. He practiced law in Brooklyn and entered politics as a Democrat.

On February 8, 1966, Giordano was elected to the New York State Assembly, to fill the vacancy caused by the resignation of William J. Ferrall, and took his seat in the 176th New York State Legislature after the results were certified on February 21. He was re-elected to the 177th, 178th and 179th New York State Legislatures. He resigned his seat on the opening day of the session of 1971, and ran for the State Senate seat vacated by the death of William J. Ferrall.

On February 9, 1971, Giordano was elected to the New York State Senate. He took his seat on February 16, and remained in the Senate of the 179th New York State Legislature until the end of 1972. In June 1972, after re-apportionment, he ran in the 23rd District for re-nomination, but was defeated in the Democratic primary by Carol Bellamy.

He died in March 1993.

New York State Assembly
Preceded by William J. Ferrall	New York State Assembly; 62nd District; 1966	Succeeded by William F. Larkin
Preceded by Bertram L. Podell	New York State Assembly; 53rd District; 1967–1971	Succeeded by Frank J. Verderame
New York State Senate
Preceded by William J. Ferrall	New York State Senate; 22nd District; 1971–1972	Succeeded by Albert B. Lewis
