= Edward M. Kinsella =

American politician

Edward M. Kinsella (June 15, 1911 – December 3, 1973) was an American politician from New York.

== Life ==
He was born on June 15, 1911 in Solvay, New York. He attended Solvay High School, Syracuse University and Le Moyne College. Then he engaged in the insurance business, and entered politics as a Republican. He married Genevieve L. Degan, and they had two sons.

Kinsella was Mayor of Solvay from 1961 to 1970; and a member of the New York State Assembly (120th D.) from 1971 until his death in 1973, sitting in the 179th and 180th New York State Legislatures.

He died on December 3, 1973, in Community General Hospital in Syracuse, New York.

New York State Assembly
Preceded by Mortimer P. Gallivan	New York State Assembly; 120th District; 1971–1973	Succeeded by Rocco Pirro
