= Donald A. Campbell =

American lawyer and politician

Donald A. Campbell (August 2, 1922 – November 8, 1992) was an American lawyer and politician from New York.

== Life ==
He was born on August 2, 1922, in Amsterdam, Montgomery County, New York. He graduated from Columbia University. During World War II he served as a lieutenant in the U.S. Army. He graduated from Albany Law School in 1948, was admitted to the bar, and practiced law in Amsterdam. He also entered politics as a Republican. He married Phyllis Topping (1923–2014), and they had three children.

He was a member of the New York State Assembly from 1951 to 1968, sitting in the 168th, 169th, 170th, 171st, 172nd, 173rd, 174th, 175th, 176th and 177th New York State Legislatures.

He was Clerk of the New York State Assembly from January 8, 1969, to February 1973, officiating in the 178th, 179th and 180th New York State Legislatures. He resigned the post in February 1973.

He died on November 8, 1992.

== General Reference ==
- Donald A. Campbell Papers, 1946-1968. M.E. Grenander Department of Special Collections and Archives, University Libraries, University at Albany, State University of New York (hereafter referred to as the Campbell Papers).

New York State Assembly
Preceded by John F. Bennison	New York State Assembly; Montgomery County; 1951–1965	Succeeded by district abolished
Preceded by new district	New York State Assembly; 123rd District; 1966	Succeeded by Kenneth S. Leasure
Preceded by Stephen G. Doig, Jr.	New York State Assembly; 104th District; 1967–1968	Succeeded by Mary Anne Krupsak
Government offices
Preceded by John T. McKennan	Clerk of the New York State Assembly; 1969–1973	Succeeded by Thomas H. Bartzos
