= Harvey M. Lifset =

American politician

Harvey Mervin Lifset
- Born: March 6, 1916; Schenectady, New York, U.S.
- Died: May 21, 2005 (aged 89); Daughters of Sarah Nursing Home, Albany, New York, U.S.
- Education: Union College, Albany Law School
- Occupations: Lawyer and politician
- Office: Member of the New York State Assembly
- Predecessor: James J. McGuiness
- Successor: Fred G. Field Jr.
- Political party: Democratic
- Spouse: Violet L. Rubin (m. 1942)
- Children: Two sons
- Awards: Bronze Star Medal, six battle stars, Arrowhead device

Harvey Mervin Lifset (March 6, 1916 – May 21, 2005) was an American lawyer and politician from New York.

== Life ==
He was born on March 6, 1916, in Schenectady, New York, the son of Abram Lifset and Rose (Barish) Lifset. He attended Nott Terrace High School. He graduated A.B. from Union College in 1937, and LL.B. from Albany Law School in 1940. He was admitted to the bar in 1940. In May 1942, he married Violet L. Rubin, and they had two sons. During World War II he served in the U.S. Army, and finished the war as a major of the 82nd Airborne Division. He was awarded the Bronze Star Medal, six battle stars, and an Arrowhead device. Later he was promoted to colonel of the Army Reserve. In 1946, he began to practice law in Albany.

Lifset was a member of the New York State Assembly from 1957 to 1968, sitting in the 171st, 172nd, 173rd, 174th, 175th, 176th and 177th New York State Legislatures. He was Chairman of the Committee on Affairs of Cities in 1965, and Chairman of the Committee on Ways and Means from 1966 to 1968.

He died on May 21, 2005, in the Daughters of Sarah Nursing Home in Albany, New York.

== Sources ==
New York State Assembly
Preceded by James J. McGuiness	New York State Assembly; Albany County, 2nd District; 1957–1965	Succeeded by district abolished
Preceded by new district	New York State Assembly; 112th District; 1966	Succeeded by Donald J. Mitchell
Preceded by Peter R. Biondo	New York State Assembly; 103rd District; 1967–1968	Succeeded by Fred G. Field Jr.
Preceded by John T. Satriale	New York State Assembly; Chairman of the Committee on Ways and Means; 1966–1968	Succeeded by Willis H. Stephens
