= Walter B. Langley =

American lawyer and politician

Walter Bernard Langley (April 7, 1921 – September 3, 1976) was an American lawyer and politician from New York.

== Life ==
He was born on April 7, 1921, in Amsterdam, Montgomery County, New York. There he attended St. Mary's Institute. He graduated B.B.A. from Niagara University in 1943. During World War II, he served as a first lieutenant in the U.S. Army. He graduated from New York University School of Law, was admitted to the bar, practiced law in Albany, and entered politics as a Republican. On May 23, 1964, he married Harriet Frances Shaughnessy,

Langley was a member of the New York State Senate from 1969 to 1974, sitting in the 178th, 179th and 180th New York State Legislatures.

He died on September 3, 1976, at his home in Albany, New York.

New York State Senate
Preceded by Julian B. Erway	New York State Senate; 40th District; 1969–1972	Succeeded by Richard E. Schermerhorn
Preceded by Ronald B. Stafford	New York State Senate; 42nd District; 1973–1974	Succeeded by Howard C. Nolan, Jr.
