= Albert B. Lewis =

American lawyer, accountant, and politician (1925–2021)

Albert Benjamin Lewis (October 16, 1925 – August 7, 2021) was an American lawyer, accountant and politician from New York.

== Life and career ==
Lewis was born on October 16, 1925. He attended Brooklyn College from 1943 to 1944, and served in the U.S. Army from 1944 to 1946. After the war he finished his college course, and graduated from St. John's University School of Law in January 1954. He became a CPA in October 1954, was admitted to the bar, and practiced law and public accountancy in Brooklyn. He married Sara Ann Beresniakoff.

Lewis was a Democratic member of the New York State Senate from 1967 to 1978, sitting in the 177th, 178th, 179th, 180th, 181st and 182nd New York State Legislatures.

On January 4, 1978, he was appointed as State Superintendent of Insurance. He remained on the post until March 1983. Afterwards he resumed the practice of law.

He was of counsel to the firm of D'Amato & Lynch LLP.

Lewis died in August 2021 at the age of 95. He was Jewish.

New York State Senate
Preceded by Edward S. Lentol	New York State Senate; 20th District; 1967–1972	Succeeded by Donald Halperin
Preceded by William J. Giordano	New York State Senate; 22nd District; 1973–1978	Succeeded by Martin M. Solomon
Government offices
Preceded by John F. Lennon	New York State Superintendent of Insurance; 1978–1983	Succeeded by James P. Corcoran
