= Alfred A. DelliBovi =

American politician

Member of the New York State Assembly
- In office November 2, 1971 – December 31, 1978
- Preceded by: Alfred D. Lerner
- Succeeded by: Anthony S. Seminerio
- Constituency: 28th district (1971-1972); 31st district (1973-1978)

Personal details
- Born: February 1, 1946 (age 80) New York City, U.S.
- Party: Republican
- Education: Fordham College; Baruch College

Alfred A. DelliBovi (born February 1, 1946) is an American banker and political figure who was President of the Federal Home Loan Bank of New York from 1992 until 2014.

== Biography ==
DelliBovi was born in New York City and grew up in Astoria, Queens. He graduated from Fordham College (B.A., 1967) and Baruch College (M.P.A., 1973). He initially worked as a high school English and social studies teacher. He was director of the public relations unit for the State Assembly from 1969 to 1971 before being elected to it.

DelliBovi was a member of the New York State Assembly from 1971 to 1978, sitting in the 179th, 180th, 181st and 182nd New York State Legislatures. There he specialized in banking issues. He was the Republican nominee for election to the U.S. House of Representatives from New York's 9th Congressional District in 1978, but lost to Democrat Geraldine Ferraro.

He was Regional Administrator in New York from 1981 to 1984, Deputy Administrator from 1984 to 1987, and Administrator of the Urban Mass Transportation Administration at the U.S. Department of Transportation in Washington, D.C. from 1987 to 1989, having been appointed by President Ronald Reagan.

He was United States Deputy Secretary of Housing and Urban Development from 1989 until 1992 under Jack Kemp, having been appointed by President George H. W. Bush.

In November 1992, DelliBovi became president and CEO of the Federal Home Loan Bank of New York. He remained in the position for 21 years, until retiring on March 31, 2014.

New York State Assembly
Preceded by Alfred D. Lerner	New York State Assembly; 28th District; 1971–1972	Succeeded by Alan G. Hevesi
Preceded by Joseph F. Lisa	New York State Assembly; 31st District; 1973–1978	Succeeded by Anthony S. Seminerio
