= Ralph E. Quattrociocchi =

American politician

Ralph Quattrociocchi
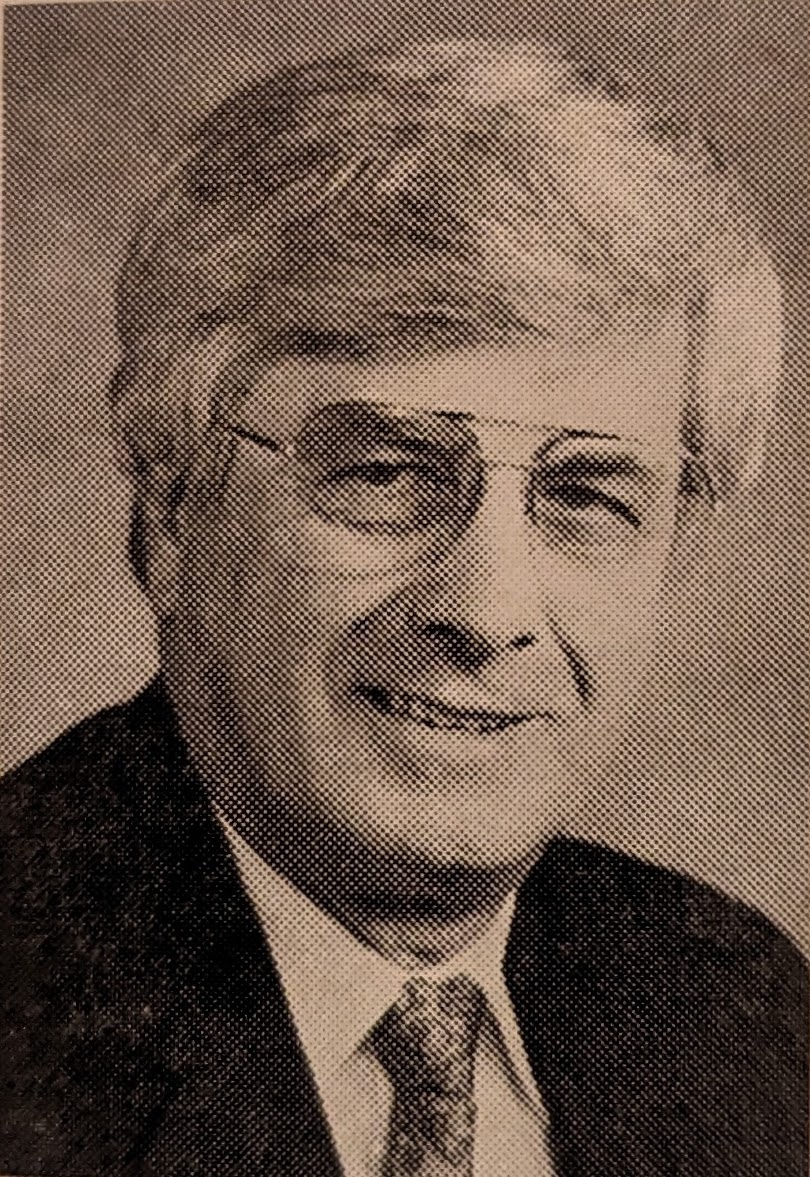

Member of the New York State Senate from the 55th district
- In office 1984–1992
- Preceded by: William Steinfeldt
- Succeeded by: Richard Dollinger (redistricting)

Personal details
- Born: October 11, 1929
- Died: February 24, 1996 (aged 66)
- Party: Democratic (1973–1993) Republican (1993–1996)

Raffaele "Ralph" E. Quattrociocchi (June 11, 1929 – February 24, 1996) was a 20th-century politician most notable for having served as New York State Senator. He was a Democrat for most of his political career.

== Life ==
Quattrociocchi was born on June 11, 1929, in Rochester, New York. He attended Edison Technical and Industrial High School. After graduation, he served the United States Air Force where he became Airman First Class in a radar unit. He then began a 30-year career as a communications technician at AT&T, where he joined the Communications Workers of America.

His first foray into politics was an unsuccessful run for the Monroe County, New York legislature in 1973. He prevailed in the election two years later for the same seat, representing part of Greece, New York, and held that office for a total of five consecutive terms.

In 1984, he unseated incumbent William M. Steinfeldt for the 55th district Senate seat. Quattrociocchi was a member of the New York State Senate from 1985 to 1992, sitting in the 186th, 187th, 188th and 189th New York State Legislatures.

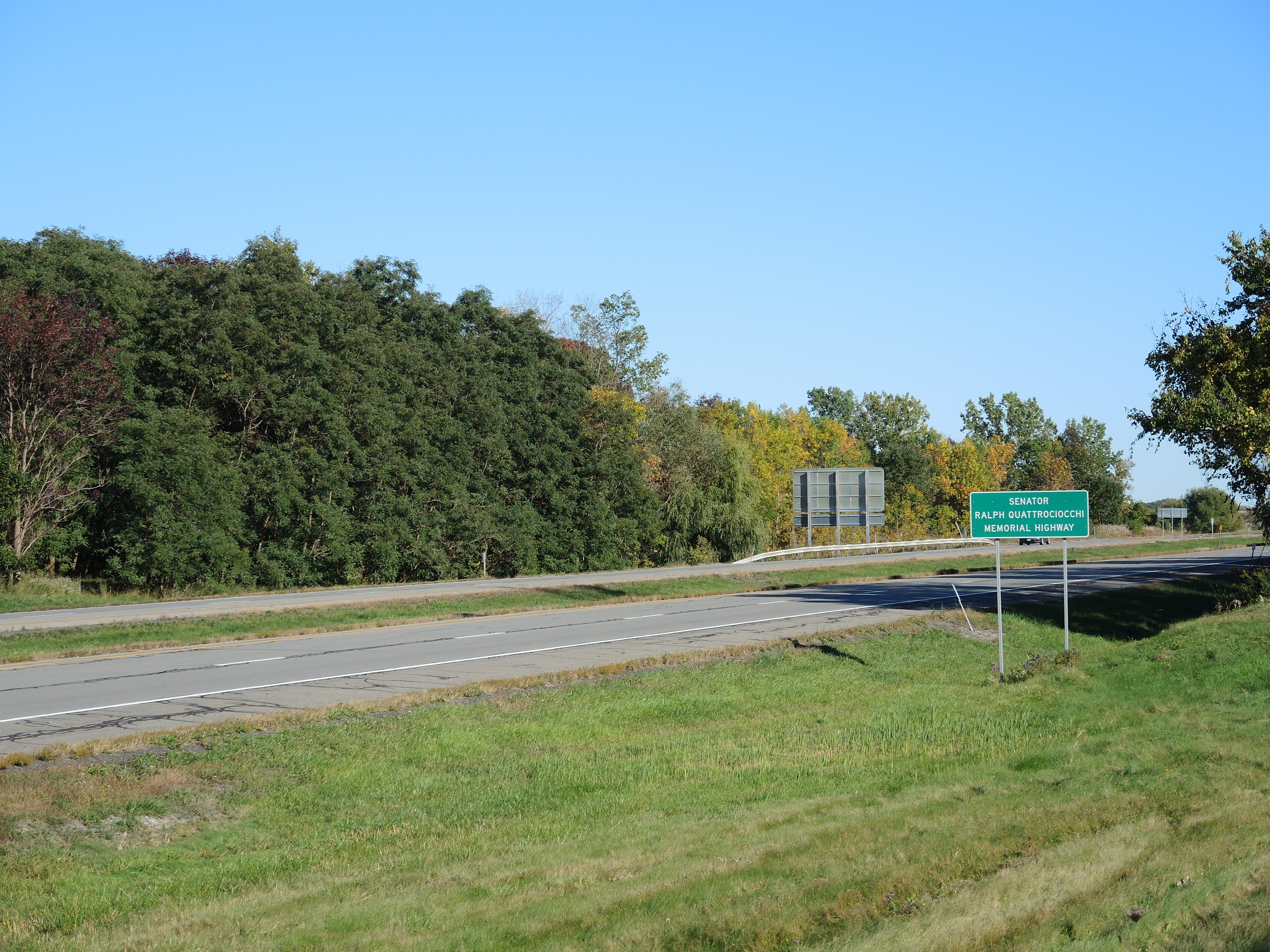
Senator Ralph Quattrociocchi Memorial Highway

Quattrociocchi's accomplishments include securing state funding to extend New York State Route 531 to Ogden, New York, forming a Senate task force on teen stress, and instituting "Operation Watch" to reduce the likelihood of mishaps at railroad crossing signals.

In 1988, Quattrociocchi was swept up in Robert M. Morgenthau's investigation of Senate Minority Leader Manfred Ohrenstein and the alleged misuse of state monies to fund the 1986 campaigns of several state Senators. The presiding judge found that Quattrociocchi was aware that a full-time aide had been hired for the sole purpose of campaigning, but since the deed had taken place outside of New York County, the District Attorney had no jurisdiction. District Attorneys in Albany and Monroe counties subsequently declined to prosecute.

In the early 1990s, the 55th senate district was redrawn to include Brighton, Monroe County, New York and parts of the city of Rochester, ultimately leading to his defeat in both the 1992 Democratic primary and the general election. Quattrociocchi switched political parties the year before the 1994 election, only to be defeated again.

He died of a heart attack in 1996 and is interred in Holy Sepulchre Cemetery.

New York State Senate
Preceded by William M. Steinfeldt	New York State Senate; 55th District; 1985–1992	Succeeded by Mary Ellen Jones
