= Robert M. Blakeman =

American politician (1925–2018)

Member of the New York State Assembly
- In office January 1, 1966 – December 31, 1966
- Preceded by: District established
- Succeeded by: Herbert A. Posner
- Constituency: 19th district
- In office 1961 – December 31, 1964
- Preceded by: Palmer D. Farrington
- Succeeded by: John S. Thorp Jr.
- Constituency: Nassau's 6th district

Personal details
- Born: August 9, 1925 New York City, U.S.
- Died: April 21, 2018 (aged 92) Valley Stream, New York, U.S.
- Party: Republican
- Spouse: Betty Ellen Blakeman
- Children: 5, including Bruce
- Education: Hofstra University (BA); New York University Law School (JD)

Robert M. Blakeman (August 9, 1925 – April 21, 2018) was an American attorney and politician who served in the New York State Assembly from 1961 to 1964 and in 1966.

== Early life and education ==
Blakeman was born in New York City to Jesse H. and Edythe R. Blakeman, and raised in Long Beach, where he graduated high school. During World War II, he served in the United States Merchant Marine.

After the war, he attended Hofstra University and thereafter New York University Law School. In his role as an attorney for the Village of Valley Stream, he negotiated the transfer of the southern portion of Valley Stream State Park to the village, which developed it as Hendrickson Park.

== Career ==
Blakeman was elected to the New York state Assembly in 1961, serving for three terms.

He was a founder of Franklin Hospital in Valley Stream, serving as its first president. For his leadership at the hospital, the service road of Southern State Parkway bordering on the hospital was named Blakeman Drive.

== Personal life and death ==
Blakeman was married to his wife Betty Ellen Blakeman for more than 40 years until her death in 1995. They have 5 children: Karen, Linda, Cathy, Bruce, and Bradley. Bradley was Deputy Assistant to President George W. Bush, and Bruce was elected Nassau County Executive in 2021.

He died on April 21, 2018, in Valley Stream at age 92. He was Jewish.
