= William J. Ferrall =

American politician

William J. Ferrall (June 15, 1905 – December 13, 1970) was an American lawyer and politician from New York.

== Life ==
He was born on June 15, 1905, in Brooklyn, New York City. He attended St. John Evangelist Grammar School, St. Francis Xavier Grammar School and Brooklyn Preparatory School. He graduated from Fordham College and Fordham Law School. He practiced law in New York City, and entered politics as a Democrat. He married Kathleen T. Delaney (died 1999), and they had three sons.

Ferrall was a member of the New York State Assembly from 1963 to 1966, sitting in the 174th, 175th and 176th New York State Legislatures. On January 6, 1966, he resigned his seat to run for the State Senate seat vacated by the appointment of Guy James Mangano to the New York City Family Court.

Ferrall was elected on February 8, 1966, to the New York State Senate, and was re-elected three times. He remained a member of the State Senate until his death in 1970, sitting in the 176th, 177th and 178th New York State Legislatures.

He died on December 13, 1970, in Veterans Administration Hospital in Manhattan.

== Sources ==
New York State Assembly
Preceded by Guy James Mangano	New York State Assembly; Kings County, 8th District; 1963–1965	Succeeded by district abolished
Preceded by new district	New York State Assembly; 62nd District; 1966	Succeeded by William J. Giordano
New York State Senate
Preceded by Guy James Mangano	New York State Senate; 24th District; 1966	Succeeded by Paul P. E. Bookson
Preceded by Samuel L. Greenberg	New York State Senate; 22nd District; 1967–1970	Succeeded by William J. Giordano
