= Irwin J. Landes =

American politician

Member of the New York State Assembly from the 16th district
- In office January 1, 1973 – December 31, 1978
- Preceded by: George J. Farrell Jr.
- Succeeded by: May W. Newburger

Member of the New York State Assembly from the 18th district
- In office January 1, 1971 – December 31, 1972
- Preceded by: Vincent R. Balletta Jr.
- Succeeded by: Armand D'Amato

Personal details
- Born: March 6, 1926 Brooklyn, New York City, New York
- Died: May 27, 2010 (aged 84) Tequesta, Florida
- Party: Democratic

Irwin J. Landes (March 6, 1926 – May 27, 2010) was an American politician who served in the New York State Assembly from 1971 to 1978. He was Jewish.

He died on May 27, 2010, in Tequesta, Florida at age 84.
