= Stuart R. Levine =

American politician

Member of the New York State Assembly from the 10th district
- In office January 1, 1973 – December 31, 1974
- Preceded by: Milton Jonas
- Succeeded by: Lewis J. Yevoli

Personal details
- Born: May 27, 1947 (age 79) Brooklyn, New York City, New York
- Party: Republican

Stuart R. Levine (born May 27, 1947) is an American politician who served in the New York State Assembly from the 10th district from 1973 to 1974.
