= Dorothy H. Rose =

American politician

Dorothy H. Rose (September 21, 1920 – July 8, 2005) was an American politician from New York.

== Life ==
She was born Dorothy Zdarsky on September 21, 1920, in Buffalo, New York. She attended East High School. She graduated B.A. from D'Youville College, and B.Sc. in library science from Geneseo State Teachers College. Then, alternatively, she taught English at several high schools and colleges, or worked as a librarian at several libraries. She married Thomas A. Rose (died 1959), a newspaper editor and publisher. She also entered politics as a Democrat.

Dorothy H. Rose was a member of the New York State Assembly from 1965 to 1968, sitting in the 175th, 176th and 177th New York State Legislatures.

She died on July 8, 2005, in Mercy Hospital in Buffalo, New York, after a stroke.

== Sources ==
New York State Assembly
Preceded by William Sadler	New York State Assembly; Erie County, 8th District; 1965	Succeeded by district abolished
Preceded by new district	New York State Assembly; 163rd District; 1966	Succeeded by district abolished
Preceded by James E. Powers	New York State Assembly; 147th District; 1967–1968	Succeeded by Ronald H. Tills
