= Daniel M. Kelly =

American politician

Member of the New York State Assembly from the 69th district
- In office January 1, 1967 – December 31, 1968
- Preceded by: William F. Passannante
- Succeeded by: Franz S. Leichter

Member of the New York State Assembly from the 74th district
- In office January 1, 1966 – December 31, 1966
- Preceded by: Mark T. Southall
- Succeeded by: District abolished

Member of the New York State Assembly from New York's 7th district
- In office January 1, 1951 – December 31, 1965
- Preceded by: James T. McNamara
- Succeeded by: District abolished

Personal details
- Born: February 6, 1915 Manhattan, New York City, New York
- Died: October 26, 1982 (aged 67) Manhattan, New York City, New York
- Party: Democratic

Daniel M. Kelly (February 6, 1915 – October 26, 1982) was an American politician who served in the New York State Assembly from 1951 to 1968.

He died on October 26, 1982, in Manhattan, New York City, New York at age 67.
