= Vincent R. Balletta Jr. =

American politician (1927–1996)

Member of the New York State Assembly from the 18th district
- In office January 1, 1967 – December 31, 1970
- Preceded by: George J. Farrell Jr.
- Succeeded by: Irwin J. Landes

Personal details
- Born: July 7, 1927 Brooklyn, New York City, New York
- Died: October 4, 1996 (aged 69) Port Washington, New York
- Party: Republican

Vincent R. Balletta Jr. (July 7, 1927 – October 4, 1996) was an American politician who served in the New York State Assembly from the 18th district from 1967 to 1970.

Prior to serving in the New York State Assembly, Balletta served as a member of the North Hempstead Town Council between 1959 and 1966.

He died of cancer on October 4, 1996, in Port Washington, New York at age 69.
