= Thomas R. Fortune =

American politician

Member of the New York State Assembly from the 55th district
- In office January 1, 1969 – December 31, 1982
- Preceded by: Shirley Chisholm
- Succeeded by: William F. Boyland

Personal details
- Born: February 8, 1917 Suffolk, Virginia
- Died: December 30, 1986 (aged 69) Brooklyn, New York City, New York
- Party: Democratic

Thomas R. Fortune (February 8, 1917 – December 30, 1986) was an American politician who served in the New York State Assembly from the 55th district from 1969 to 1982.

He died on December 30, 1986, in Brooklyn, New York City, New York at age 69.
