= Kenneth N. Browne =

American politician

Member of the New York State Assembly from the 26th district
- In office January 1, 1967 – December 31, 1968
- Preceded by: Leonard P. Stavisky
- Succeeded by: Guy Brewer

Member of the New York State Assembly from the 22nd district
- In office January 1, 1966 – December 31, 1966
- Preceded by: District created
- Succeeded by: John T. Gallagher

Member of the New York State Assembly from Queens's 11th district
- In office January 1, 1965 – December 31, 1965
- Preceded by: Alfred D. Lerner
- Succeeded by: District abolished

Personal details
- Born: June 25, 1923 Queens, New York City, New York, U.S.
- Died: February 22, 2000 (aged 76) Queens, New York City, New York, U.S.
- Party: Democratic

Kenneth N. Browne (June 25, 1923 – February 22, 2000) was an American politician who served in the New York State Assembly from 1965 to 1968.

He died of prostate cancer on February 22, 2000, in Queens, New York City, New York at age 76.
