= Charles A. Jerabek =

American politician

Member of the New York State Assembly from the 3rd district
- In office January 1, 1969 – December 31, 1972
- Preceded by: Charles J. Melton
- Succeeded by: Icilio W. Bianchi Jr.

Personal details
- Born: July 23, 1922 Prague, Czechoslovakia
- Died: June 28, 2006 (aged 83)
- Party: Republican

Charles A. Jerabek (July 23, 1922 – June 28, 2006) was an American politician who served in the New York State Assembly from the 3rd district from 1969 to 1972.
