= Armando Montano (politician) =

American politician (1928–2007)

Member of the New York State Assembly from the 77th district
- In office January 1, 1969 – December 31, 1982
- Preceded by: William Martinez
- Succeeded by: Jose Rivera

Personal details
- Born: October 10, 1928 San Juan, Puerto Rico
- Died: December 5, 2007 (aged 79) East Patchogue, New York, U.S.
- Resting place: Queen of All Saints Cemetery; Central Islip, New York, U.S.
- Party: Democratic
- Spouse: Norma
- Children: 3

Armando Montano (October 10, 1928 – December 5, 2007) was an American politician who served in the New York State Assembly from the 77th district from 1969 to 1982.

== Early life ==
Armando Montano was born on October 10, 1928, in San Juan, Puerto Rico. As an infant, he moved to East Harlem, New York. He dropped out of high school to work and then joined the United States Merchant Marine Academy. He served in the Korean War. As an adult, he attended night school and earned a high school diploma, as well as real estate and insurance licenses.

== Career ==
Montano formed independent Democratic political clubs in the Bronx. He ran for the New York State Assembly and lost twice. He was then elected and served as a member of the New York State Assembly, representing the 77th district, from 1969 to 1982. He was chairman of the housing and senior citizens committees and advocated for rights of Spanish speakers. He passed the first bilingual education bill in the New York State Assembly.

In 1976, New York City cut off funding to the Institute of Puerto Rican Studies through funding from the Comprehensive Employment and Training Act following concerns of nepotism. It was reported that six of Montano's relatives were hired while Montano was chairman of the institute's board. In 1982, he lost his bid for re-election in the primaries.

Montano moved to Hauppauge, New York, and opened a real estate and insurance practice.

== Legal issues ==
In September 1972, Montano was arraigned in Bronx Criminal Court on charges of rioting in the first degree, inciting to riot, obstruction of government administration, resisting arrest, and harassment. Witnesses stated he climbed on top of a car and said "Let's put the police on notice that tonight there will be a blood bath" to around 300 demonstrators in South Bronx. He was indicted by a grand jury in December 1972.

== Personal life ==
Montano married Norma. They had three sons, Armando Jr., Ronald, and Mark. In 1982, his son Armando Jr. ran for election in the 73rd district of the New York State Assembly.

Montano died of Parkinson's disease on December 5, 2007, at Brookhaven Memorial Hospital Medical Center in East Patchogue. He was buried in Queen of All Saints Cemetery in Central Islip.
