= Stephen S. Gottlieb =

American politician

Member of the New York State Assembly from the 71st district
- In office January 1, 1969 – December 31, 1972
- Preceded by: Orest V. Maresca
- Succeeded by: Franz S. Leichter

Personal details
- Born: June 4, 1936
- Died: October 20, 2013 (aged 77)
- Party: Democratic

Stephen S. Gottlieb (June 4, 1936 – October 20, 2013) was an American politician who served in the New York State Assembly from the 71st district from 1969 to 1972.

He died of heart failure on October 20, 2013, at age 77.
