= Vincent A. Riccio =

American politician

Member of the New York City Council from the Brooklyn at-large district
- In office January 1, 1978 – May 14, 1981
- Preceded by: John F. Gangemi
- Succeeded by: Michael R. Long

Member of the New York State Assembly from the 51st district
- In office January 1, 1969 – December 31, 1974
- Preceded by: Joseph S. Levine
- Succeeded by: Joseph Ferris

Personal details
- Born: July 27, 1919 Brooklyn, New York City, New York
- Died: February 14, 1985 (aged 65) Miami, Florida
- Party: Republican

Vincent A. Riccio (July 27, 1919 – February 14, 1985) was an American politician who served in the New York State Assembly from the 51st district from 1969 to 1974 and in the New York City Council from the Brooklyn at-large district from 1978 to 1981.

He died of a heart attack on February 14, 1985, in Miami, Florida at age 65.
