= Orison S. Marden (lawyer) =

American lawyer

Orison Swett Marden, Jr.
- Born: May 22, 1906; Sea Cliff, New York
- Died: August 25, 1975 (aged 69); New York Hospital; Manhattan, New York
- Education: New York University
- Title: President of the New York City Bar Association
- Term: 1960-1962
- Parent: Orison Swett Marden, Sr.

Orison Swett Marden, Jr. (May 22, 1906 – August 25, 1975) was a New York City lawyer, a leader of the Legal Aid Society, and a president of the American Bar Association, the New York State Bar Association, and the New York City Bar Association.

== Early life and education ==
Orison Marden was born in Sea Cliff, Long Island on May 22, 1906. His father, Orison Swett Marden, after whom he was named, was a well-known lawyer, physician, and writer of books on self-improvement.

Marden attended the McBurney School in Manhattan, and received his Bachelor of Arts and Juris Doctor degrees from New York University in 1926 and 1929.

== Career ==
=== Private practice ===
Marden began his career at White & Case in 1930. He became a partner in 1946, and later became head of the firm's litigation department.

=== Public service ===
Outside of his specialty in corporate law, Marden was for many years a prominent advocate for defendants' rights and the legal rights of the poor. In the 1930s he served as one of twelve charter members of an "Associates Committee" to expand the services of the Legal Aid Society and to recruit young lawyers to work in pro bono and indigent defense. In 1949, Marden was instrumental in expanding the Legal Aid Society's services to the Federal Court System. From 1970 until his death, Marden was also chairman of the board of the Legal Aid Society.

Marden's interest in legal service extended to the national and international arenas as well. He served as vice president of the National Legal Aid and Defender Association from 1949 to 1955, and as president from 1955 to 1959. Along with Sir Sydney Littlewood, he co-chaired the International Bar Association's special committee to organize the International Legal Aid Organization, and was its first president when it was established in Oslo, Norway in 1960.

In addition to his prominent role in legal aid, Marden also served as president of the New York City Bar Association from 1960 to 1962, the New York State Bar Association from 1964 to 1965, and the American Bar Association from 1966 to 1967. From 1973 to 1975, he was president of the Institute of Judicial Administration

=== Government service ===
Marden was also a long-time advocate for court reform. In 1966, he was appointed by the New York State Court of Appeals to serve as chairman of the Judicial Commission to Reapportion New York State. From 1963 to 1970, as president of the National Defender Project, Marden also administered a six million dollar grant from the Ford Foundation to establish model public defender offices in several U.S. cities. He was a prominent advocate for an appointive judiciary and argued for the improvement of the quality of lawyers in the Federal Court system. In 1972, he joined with seven other prominent lawyers in publicly denouncing New York City's system of electing judges as a "farce and charade."

Orison Marden died at New York Hospital on August 25, 1975. He was 69 years old.

== Sources ==
- “New York Lawyer to Head Bar in ’66; Orison Marden, 58, to lead U.S. Association.” The New York Times. February 10, 1965.
- “Orison Marden Nominated to Head State Bar Group.” The New York Times.
