= Orest V. Maresca =

American politician (1914–2000)

Member of the New York State Assembly from the 71st district
- In office January 1, 1967 – December 31, 1968
- Preceded by: John M. Burns
- Succeeded by: Stephen S. Gottlieb

Member of the New York State Assembly from the 80th district
- In office January 1, 1966 – December 31, 1966
- Preceded by: District created
- Succeeded by: Ferdinand J. Mondello

Member of the New York State Assembly from New York's 13th district
- In office January 1, 1951 – December 31, 1965
- Preceded by: Harold A. Stevens
- Succeeded by: District abolished

Personal details
- Born: May 27, 1914 Manhattan, New York City, New York
- Died: October 6, 2000 (aged 86) Manhattan, New York City, New York
- Party: Democratic

Orest V. Maresca (May 27, 1914 – October 6, 2000) was an American politician who served in the New York State Assembly from 1951 to 1968.
