= Raymond J. Lill =

American politician

Member of the New York State Assembly from the 131st district
- In office January 1, 1967 – December 31, 1976
- Preceded by: Donald L. Taylor
- Succeeded by: Gary Proud

Personal details
- Born: July 26, 1913 Rochester, New York
- Died: April 7, 1977 (aged 63) Reno, Nevada
- Party: Democratic

Raymond J. Lill (July 26, 1913 – April 7, 1977) was an American politician who served in the New York State Assembly from the 131st district from 1967 to 1976.

He died of a heart attack on April 7, 1977, in Reno, Nevada at age 63.
