= Frank Walkley =

American politician

New York State Commissioner of Agriculture and Markets
- In office July 1, 1972 – February 1975
- Governor: Nelson Rockefeller; Malcolm Wilson
- Preceded by: Don J. Wickham
- Succeeded by: John S. Dyson

Member of the New York State Assembly from the 148th district
- In office January 1, 1967 – July 1, 1972
- Preceded by: Charles F. Stockmeister
- Succeeded by: Dale M. Volker

Member of the New York State Assembly from the 150th district
- In office January 1, 1966 – December 31, 1966
- Preceded by: District created
- Succeeded by: Jess J. Present

Member of the New York State Assembly from the Wyoming district
- In office January 1, 1965 – December 31, 1965
- Preceded by: Harold L. Peet
- Succeeded by: District abolished

Personal details
- Born: October 17, 1921 Oneida, New York, U.S.
- Died: June 6, 2009 (aged 87) Castile, New York, U.S.
- Party: Republican

Frank Aldrich Walkley (October 17, 1921 – June 6, 2009) was an American politician who served in the New York State Assembly from 1965 to 1972.
