= Herbert A. Posner =

American politician (1925–2018)

Member of the New York State Assembly from the 22nd district
- In office January 1, 1973 – December 31, 1975
- Preceded by: John T. Gallagher
- Succeeded by: Gerdi E. Lipschutz

Member of the New York State Assembly from the 19th district
- In office January 1, 1967 – December 31, 1972
- Preceded by: Robert M. Blakeman
- Succeeded by: John S. Thorp Jr.

Personal details
- Born: March 1, 1925 The Bronx, New York City, New York
- Died: March 18, 2018 (aged 93) San Diego, California
- Party: Democratic

Herbert A. Posner (March 1, 1925 – March 18, 2018) was an American politician who served in the New York State Assembly from 1967 to 1975.
