= Alexander Chananau =

American politician

Member of the New York State Assembly from the 82nd district
- In office January 1, 1967 – December 31, 1972
- Preceded by: Kenneth J. Lyman
- Succeeded by: Thomas J. Culhane

Member of the New York State Assembly from the 88th district
- In office January 1, 1966 – December 31, 1966
- Preceded by: District created
- Succeeded by: George E. Van Cott

Member of the New York State Assembly from The Bronx's 8th district
- In office January 1958 – December 31, 1965
- Preceded by: Mitchell J. Sherwin
- Succeeded by: District abolished

Personal details
- Born: November 11, 1915 The Bronx, New York City, New York
- Died: November 22, 2003 (aged 88)
- Party: Democratic

Alexander Chananau (November 11, 1915 – November 22, 2003) was an American politician who served in the New York State Assembly from 1958 to 1972.

He died on November 22, 2003, at age 88.
