= Mortimer P. Gallivan =

American politician

Member of the New York State Assembly from the 120th district
- In office January 1, 1967 – December 31, 1970
- Preceded by: Louis E. Wolfe
- Succeeded by: Edward M. Kinsella

Member of the New York State Assembly from the 135th district
- In office January 1, 1966 – December 31, 1966
- Preceded by: District created
- Succeeded by: Donald W. Cook

Personal details
- Born: February 27, 1914 Syracuse, New York, U.S.
- Died: August 28, 1990 (aged 76) Syracuse, New York, U.S.
- Party: Democratic

Mortimer P. Gallivan (February 27, 1914 – August 28, 1990) was an American politician who served in the New York State Assembly from 1966 to 1970.

He died on August 28, 1990, in Syracuse, New York at age 76.
