= Anthony J. Stella =

American politician

Member of the New York State Assembly from the 86th district
- In office January 1, 1969 – December 31, 1974
- Preceded by: Joseph A. Fusco
- Succeeded by: Vincent A. Marchiselli

Member of the New York State Assembly from the 92nd district
- In office January 1, 1966 – December 31, 1966
- Preceded by: District created
- Succeeded by: Richard A. Cerosky

Personal details
- Born: June 19, 1928 The Bronx, New York. U.S.
- Died: October 1978 (aged 50)
- Party: Democratic

Anthony J. Stella (June 19, 1928 – October 1978) was an American politician who served in the New York State Assembly in 1966 and from 1969 to 1974. Tony Stella was a Reform Democrat all his life. He was very close with Robert Abrams and other Reform Democrats
