= Jerome Kretchmer =

American politician

Member of the New York State Assembly from the 65th district
- In office January 1, 1967 – December 31, 1970
- Preceded by: Edward J. Amann Jr.
- Succeeded by: Richard N. Gottfried

Member of the New York State Assembly from the 68th district
- In office January 1, 1966 – December 31, 1966
- Preceded by: District created
- Succeeded by: Frank G. Rossetti

Member of the New York State Assembly from New York's 3rd district
- In office January 1, 1963 – December 31, 1965
- Preceded by: Francis W. Doheny
- Succeeded by: District abolished

Personal details
- Born: September 15, 1934 (age 91) The Bronx, New York City, New York
- Party: Democratic

Jerome Kretchmer (born September 15, 1934) is an American politician who served in the New York State Assembly from 1963 to 1970.

== Personal life ==
He is Jewish.
