= Gregory J. Pope =

American politician

Member of the New York State Assembly from the 138th district
- In office January 1, 1967 – December 31, 1970
- Preceded by: Constance E. Cook
- Succeeded by: Richard J. Hogan

Member of the New York State Assembly from the 152nd district
- In office January 1, 1966 – December 31, 1966
- Preceded by: District created
- Succeeded by: District abolished

Member of the New York State Assembly from Niagara's 6th district
- In office January 1, 1965 – December 31, 1965
- Preceded by: Harold H. Altro
- Succeeded by: District abolished

Personal details
- Born: November 27, 1926 Medina, New York, U.S.
- Died: May 1976 (aged 49)
- Party: Democratic

Gregory J. Pope (November 27, 1926 – May 1976) was an American politician who served in the New York State Assembly from 1965 to 1970.
