= Richard A. Cerosky =

American politician

Member of the New York State Assembly from the 92nd district
- In office January 1, 1967 – December 31, 1970
- Preceded by: Anthony J. Stella
- Succeeded by: J. Edward Meyer

Member of the New York State Assembly from the 102nd district
- In office January 1, 1966 – December 31, 1966
- Preceded by: District created
- Succeeded by: Frank P. Cox

Member of the New York State Assembly from Westchester's 6th district
- In office January 1, 1965 – December 31, 1965
- Preceded by: Bernard G. Gordon
- Succeeded by: District abolished

Personal details
- Born: February 13, 1927 Port Chester, New York, U.S.
- Died: November 30, 2016 (aged 89) Glens Falls, New York, U.S.
- Party: Republican

Richard A. Cerosky (February 13, 1927 – November 30, 2016) was an American politician who served in the New York State Assembly from 1965 to 1970.

He died on November 30, 2016, in Glens Falls, New York at age 89.
