= Joseph M. Reilly =

American politician

Member of the New York State Assembly from the 14th district
- In office January 1, 1973 – December 31, 1982
- Preceded by: Jerry Kremer
- Succeeded by: Frederick E. Parola

Member of the New York State Assembly from the 7th district
- In office January 1, 1967 – December 31, 1972
- Preceded by: William L. Burns
- Succeeded by: John J. Flanagan Sr.

Member of the New York State Assembly from the 11th district
- In office January 1, 1966 – December 31, 1966
- Preceded by: District created
- Succeeded by: Stanley Harwood

Personal details
- Born: July 21, 1927 Glen Cove, New York
- Died: September 23, 2012 (aged 85) Glen Cove, New York
- Party: Republican

Joseph M. Reilly (July 21, 1927 – September 23, 2012) was an American politician who was mayor of Glen Cove, New York before serving in the New York State Assembly from 1966 to 1982.

He died on September 23, 2012, in Glen Cove, New York at age 85.
