= Donald L. Taylor =

American politician

Member of the New York State Assembly from the 114th district
- In office January 1, 1973 – December 31, 1976
- Preceded by: Richard A. Brown
- Succeeded by: H. Robert Nortz

Member of the New York State Assembly from the 111th district
- In office January 1, 1967 – December 31, 1972
- Preceded by: Clarence D. Lane
- Succeeded by: Andrew W. Ryan Jr.

Member of the New York State Assembly from the 131st district
- In office January 1, 1966 – December 31, 1966
- Preceded by: District created
- Succeeded by: Raymond J. Lill

Personal details
- Born: January 30, 1915
- Died: May 4, 1987 (aged 72) Watertown, New York
- Party: Republican

Donald L. Taylor (January 30, 1915 – May 4, 1987) was an American politician who served in the New York State Assembly from 1966 to 1976.

He died on May 4, 1987, in Watertown, New York at age 72.
