= Seymour Posner =

American politician

Member of the New York State Assembly from the 76th district
- In office January 1, 1967 – February 22, 1978
- Preceded by: Frank G. Rossetti
- Succeeded by: Charles R. Johnson

Member of the New York State Assembly from the 85th district
- In office January 1, 1966 – December 31, 1966
- Preceded by: District created
- Succeeded by: Anthony J. Mercorella

Member of the New York State Assembly from The Bronx's 2nd district
- In office January 1, 1965 – December 31, 1965
- Preceded by: Burton M. Fine
- Succeeded by: District abolished

Personal details
- Born: May 21, 1925 New York City, New York
- Died: November 1, 1988 (aged 63) Brooklyn, New York City, New York
- Party: Democratic

Seymour Posner (May 21, 1925 – November 1, 1988) was an American politician who served in the New York State Assembly from 1965 to 1978.

He died of a heart attack on November 1, 1988, in Brooklyn, New York City, New York at age 63.
