= John S. Thorp Jr. =

American politician

Member of the New York State Assembly from the 19th district
- In office January 1, 1973 – December 31, 1976
- Preceded by: Herbert A. Posner
- Succeeded by: Raymond J. McGrath

Member of the New York State Assembly from the 13th district
- In office January 1, 1967 – December 31, 1972
- Preceded by: Jerry Kremer
- Succeeded by: Milton Jonas

Member of the New York State Assembly from the 14th district
- In office January 1, 1966 – December 31, 1966
- Preceded by: District created
- Succeeded by: Jerry Kremer

Member of the New York State Assembly from Nassau's 6th district
- In office January 1, 1965 – December 31, 1965
- Preceded by: Robert M. Blakeman
- Succeeded by: District abolished

Personal details
- Born: September 29, 1925 Rockville Centre, New York, U.S.
- Died: November 15, 1995 (aged 70) Rockville Centre, New York, U.S.
- Party: Democratic

John S. Thorp Jr. (September 29, 1925 – November 15, 1995) was an American politician who served in the New York State Assembly from 1965 to 1976.

He died of pulmonary fibrosis on November 15, 1995, in Rockville Centre, New York at age 70.
