= Alvin M. Suchin =

American politician

Member of the New York State Assembly from the 89th district
- In office January 1, 1967 – December 31, 1976
- Preceded by: Robert Abrams
- Succeeded by: William B. Finneran

Member of the New York State Assembly from the 96th district
- In office January 1, 1966 – December 31, 1966
- Preceded by: District created
- Succeeded by: Gordon K. Cameron

Personal details
- Born: November 18, 1919 Hastings-on-Hudson, New York
- Died: November 29, 1991 (aged 72)
- Party: Republican

Alvin M. Suchin (November 18, 1919 – November 29, 1991) was an American politician who served in the New York State Assembly from 1966 to 1976.
