= Albert J. Hausbeck =

American politician

Member of the New York State Assembly from the 144th district
- In office January 1, 1967 – December 31, 1974
- Preceded by: Hastings Morse Jr.
- Succeeded by: William B. Hoyt

Member of the New York State Assembly from the 160th district
- In office January 1, 1966 – December 31, 1966
- Preceded by: District created
- Succeeded by: District abolished

Member of the New York State Assembly from Erie's 6th district
- In office January 1, 1961 – December 31, 1965
- Preceded by: George F. Dannebrock
- Succeeded by: District abolished

Personal details
- Born: February 15, 1918 Buffalo, New York
- Died: March 30, 1999 (aged 81)
- Party: Republican (1970–1999)
- Other political affiliations: Democratic (before 1970)

Albert J. Hausbeck (February 15, 1918 – March 30, 1999) was an American politician who served in the New York State Assembly from 1961 to 1974.
