= Lawrence E. Corbett Jr. =

American politician (1921–2020)

Member of the New York State Assembly from the 107th district
- In office January 1, 1967 – December 31, 1972
- Preceded by: Willis H. Stephens
- Succeeded by: Clark C. Wemple

Member of the New York State Assembly from the 115th district
- In office January 1, 1966 – December 31, 1966
- Preceded by: District created
- Succeeded by: William R. Sears

Member of the New York State Assembly from the Washington district
- In office January 1, 1963 – December 31, 1965
- Preceded by: William J. Reid
- Succeeded by: District abolished

Personal details
- Born: May 11, 1921 Fort Edward, New York, U.S.
- Died: October 20, 2020 (aged 99) Fort Edward, New York, U.S.
- Party: Republican

Lawrence E. Corbett Jr. (May 11, 1921 – October 20, 2020) was an American politician who served in the New York State Assembly from 1963 to 1972.

He died in October 2020 at the age of 99.
