= John B. Lis =

American politician

Member of the New York State Assembly from the 145th district
- In office January 1, 1967 – December 31, 1972
- Preceded by: S. William Rosenberg
- Succeeded by: Francis J. Griffin

Member of the New York State Assembly from Erie's 5th district
- In office February 1954 – December 31, 1966
- Preceded by: Philip V. Baczkowski
- Succeeded by: District abolished

Personal details
- Born: May 28, 1915 Buffalo, New York
- Died: March 20, 1985 (aged 69) Buffalo, New York
- Party: Democratic

John B. Lis (May 28, 1915 – March 20, 1985) was an American politician who served in the New York State Assembly from 1954 to 1972.

He died of cancer on March 20, 1985, in Buffalo, New York at age 69.
