= Salvatore J. Grieco =

American politician

Member of the New York State Assembly from the 47th district
- In office January 1, 1967 – December 31, 1972
- Preceded by: Joseph R. Corso
- Succeeded by: Frank J. Barbaro

Member of the New York State Assembly from the 56th district
- In office January 1, 1966 – December 31, 1966
- Preceded by: District created
- Succeeded by: Bertram L. Baker

Member of the New York State Assembly from Kings County's 16th district
- In office January 1, 1965 – December 31, 1965
- Preceded by: Irwin Brownstein
- Succeeded by: District abolished

Personal details
- Born: December 5, 1909 Brooklyn, New York City, New York
- Died: November 7, 1998 (aged 88)
- Party: Democratic

Salvatore J. Grieco (December 5, 1909 – November 7, 1998) was an American politician who served in the New York State Assembly from 1965 to 1972.
