= Milton Jonas =

American politician

Member of the New York State Assembly from the 13th district
- In office January 1, 1973 – December 31, 1976
- Preceded by: John S. Thorp Jr.
- Succeeded by: Thomas Gulotta

Member of the New York State Assembly from the 10th district
- In office January 1, 1967 – December 31, 1972
- Preceded by: Stanley Harwood
- Succeeded by: Stuart R. Levine

Member of the New York State Assembly from the 12th district
- In office January 1, 1966 – December 31, 1966
- Preceded by: District created
- Succeeded by: Joseph M. Margiotta

Personal details
- Born: December 14, 1926 New York City, New York
- Died: October 9, 2006 (aged 79)
- Party: Republican

Milton Jonas (December 14, 1926 – October 9, 2006) was an American politician who served in the New York State Assembly from 1966 to 1976.
