= Eli Wager =

American politician

Member of the New York State Assembly from the 15th district
- In office January 1, 1967 – December 31, 1972
- Preceded by: Joseph M. Margiotta
- Succeeded by: John E. Kingston

Member of the New York State Assembly from the 20th district
- In office January 1, 1966 – December 31, 1966
- Preceded by: District created
- Succeeded by: Joseph J. Kunzeman

Personal details
- Born: February 2, 1926 Brooklyn, New York City, New York
- Died: April 13, 2003 (aged 77)
- Party: Democratic

Eli Wager (February 2, 1926 – April 13, 2003) was an American politician who served in the New York State Assembly from 1966 to 1972.
