= Peter R. Biondo =

American politician (1916–1997)

Member of the New York State Assembly from the 93rd district
- In office January 1, 1967 – December 31, 1974
- Preceded by: Anthony J. Mercorella
- Succeeded by: Mary B. Goodhue

Member of the New York State Assembly from the 103rd district
- In office January 1, 1966 – December 31, 1966
- Preceded by: District created
- Succeeded by: Harvey M. Lifset

Personal details
- Born: December 21, 1916 Kingston, New York, U.S.
- Died: May 16, 1997 (aged 80)
- Party: Republican

Peter R. Biondo (December 21, 1916 – May 16, 1997) was an American politician who served in the New York State Assembly from 1966 to 1974.
