= Mark T. Southall =

American politician (1911–1976)

Member of the New York State Assembly from the 74th district
- In office January 1, 1967 – December 31, 1974
- Preceded by: Daniel M. Kelly
- Succeeded by: Herman D. Farrell Jr.

Member of the New York State Assembly from the 79th district
- In office January 1, 1966 – December 31, 1966
- Preceded by: District created
- Succeeded by: Manuel Ramos

Member of the New York State Assembly from New York's 12th district
- In office January 1, 1963 – December 31, 1965
- Preceded by: Bessie A. Buchanan
- Succeeded by: District abolished

Personal details
- Born: June 1, 1911 Norfolk, Virginia, U.S.
- Died: June 29, 1976 (aged 65) Manhattan, New York, U.S.
- Party: Democratic

Mark T. Southall (June 1, 1911 – June 29, 1976) was an American politician who served in the New York State Assembly from 1963 to 1974. He was a Democrat.
