= Charles F. Stockmeister =

American politician

Member of the New York State Assembly from the 134th district
- In office January 1, 1967 – December 31, 1969
- Preceded by: John H. Terry
- Succeeded by: William M. Steinfeldt

Member of the New York State Assembly from the 148th district
- In office January 1, 1966 – December 31, 1966
- Preceded by: District created
- Succeeded by: Frank Walkley

Member of the New York State Assembly from Monroe's 4th district
- In office January 1, 1961 – December 31, 1965
- Preceded by: Thomas F. Riley
- Succeeded by: District abolished
- In office January 1, 1949 – December 31, 1950
- Preceded by: Thomas F. Riley
- Succeeded by: Andrew J. Schell

Personal details
- Born: August 12, 1914 Rochester, New York, U.S.
- Died: January 16, 2003 (aged 88) Clarkson, New York, U.S.
- Party: Democratic

Charles F. Stockmeister (August 12, 1914 – January 16, 2003) was an American politician who served in the New York State Assembly from 1949 to 1950 and from 1961 to 1969.

He died on January 16, 2003, in Clarkson, New York at age 88.
