= Alfred D. Lerner =

American politician

Member of the New York State Assembly from the 28th district
- In office January 1, 1967 – September 18, 1971
- Preceded by: Martin Rodell
- Succeeded by: Alfred A. DelliBovi

Member of the New York State Assembly from the 31st district
- In office January 1, 1966 – December 31, 1966
- Preceded by: District created
- Succeeded by: Sidney Lebowitz

Member of the New York State Assembly from Queens's 11th district
- In office January 1, 1957 – December 31, 1964
- Preceded by: Daniel L. Clarke
- Succeeded by: Kenneth N. Browne

Personal details
- Born: September 19, 1928 Queens, New York City, New York
- Died: August 3, 2009 (aged 80) New York City, New York
- Party: Republican

Alfred D. Lerner (September 19, 1928 – August 3, 2009) was an American politician and jurist who served in the New York State Assembly from 1957 to 1964 and from 1967 to 1971. He served as a judge in the New York State Supreme Court and its Appellate Divisions from 1973 to 2004 and was a Presiding Justice of the Appellate Division, First Department.

He died on August 3, 2009, in New York City, New York at age 80. He was Jewish.
