= William L. Burns =

American politician

William Louden Burns (January 24, 1913 – January 11, 2005) was born in Amityville, Suffolk County, Long Island, New York, on January 24, 1913. He was an American Politician from the Republican Party and served as a Member of the New York State Assembly from 1966 to 1977. William L. Burns represented New York's 7th Assembly District in 1966, the 5th Assembly District from 1967 to 1973, and the 9th Assembly District from 1973 to 1977.

He died on January 11, 2005, and was buried at Amityville Cemetery, in Amityville, New York.

New York State Assembly
Preceded by	New York State Assembly; 7th District; 1966	Succeeded by Joseph M. Reilly
Preceded by Richard DiNapoli	New York State Assembly; 5th District; 1967 - 1972	Succeeded by Dennis O'Doherty
Preceded by Philip B. Healey	New York State Assembly; 9th District; 1973 - 1977	Succeeded by Louis T. Howard
