= Samuel D. Wright =

American politician

Member of the New York City Council from the 26th district
- In office January 1, 1974 – April 20, 1978
- Preceded by: Leon A. Katz
- Succeeded by: Enoch H. Williams

Member of the New York State Assembly from the 54th district
- In office January 1, 1973 – September 12, 1973
- Preceded by: Vander L. Beatty
- Succeeded by: Charles T. Hamilton

Member of the New York State Assembly from the 37th district
- In office January 1, 1967 – December 31, 1972
- Preceded by: Joel Robert Birnhak
- Succeeded by: Rosemary R. Gunning

Member of the New York State Assembly from the 39th district
- In office January 1, 1966 – December 31, 1966
- Preceded by: District created
- Succeeded by: Leonard Yoswein

Personal details
- Born: February 13, 1925 Brooklyn, New York City, New York
- Died: January 20, 1998 (aged 72) Hilton Head Island, South Carolina
- Party: Democratic

Samuel D. Wright (February 13, 1925 – January 20, 1998) was an American politician who served in the New York State Assembly from 1966 to 1973 and in the New York City Council from 1974 to 1978.

He died of Parkinson's disease on January 20, 1998, in Hilton Head Island, South Carolina, at age 72.
