= Chester R. Hardt =

American politician (1916–1995)

Member of the New York State Assembly from the 141st district
- In office January 1, 1967 – December 31, 1974
- Preceded by: Frederick L. Warder
- Succeeded by: G. James Fremming

Personal details
- Born: July 13, 1916 Stockbridge, Michigan, U.S.
- Died: January 3, 1995 (aged 78) Pompano Beach, Florida, U.S.
- Party: Republican

Chester R. Hardt (July 13, 1916 – January 3, 1995) was an American politician who served in the New York State Assembly from the 141st district from 1967 to 1974.

He died of a heart attack on January 3, 1995, in Pompano Beach, Florida at age 78.
