= Peter J. Costigan =

American politician

Member of the New York State Assembly from the 2nd district
- In office January 1, 1966 – December 31, 1974
- Preceded by: District created
- Succeeded by: George J. Hochbrueckner

Personal details
- Born: January 16, 1930 Queens, New York, U.S.
- Died: December 31, 2015 (aged 85) Setauket-East Setauket, New York, U.S.
- Party: Republican

Peter J. Costigan (January 16, 1930 – December 31, 2015) was an American politician who served in the New York State Assembly from the 2nd district from 1966 to 1974.

He died of cancer on December 31, 2015, in Setauket-East Setauket, New York at age 85.
