= Frank G. Rossetti =

American politician

Member of the New York State Assembly from the 68th district
- In office January 1, 1967 – December 31, 1972
- Preceded by: Jerome Kretchmer
- Succeeded by: Peter A. A. Berle

Member of the New York State Assembly from the 76th district
- In office January 1, 1966 – December 31, 1966
- Preceded by: District created
- Succeeded by: Seymour Posner

Member of the New York State Assembly from New York's 16th district
- In office January 1, 1955 – December 31, 1965
- Preceded by: Louis Cioffi
- Succeeded by: District abolished

Member of the New York State Assembly from New York's 20th district
- In office January 1, 1943 – December 31, 1944
- Preceded by: Anthony Guida
- Succeeded by: District abolished

Personal details
- Born: November 25, 1907 Caserta, Italy
- Died: November 6, 1992 (aged 84) Manhattan, New York City, New York
- Party: Democratic

Frank G. Rossetti (November 25, 1907 – November 6, 1992) was an American politician who served in the New York State Assembly from 1943 to 1944 and from 1955 to 1972.

He died of cancer on November 6, 1992, in Manhattan, New York City, New York at age 84. He is buried at Saint Raymond's Cemetery in the Bronx.
