= Stephen R. Greco =

American politician

Member of the New York State Assembly from the 142nd district
- In office January 1, 1967 – December 31, 1980
- Preceded by: Joseph C. Finley
- Succeeded by: Carol A. Siwek

Member of the New York State Assembly from the 158th district
- In office January 1, 1966 – December 31, 1966
- Preceded by: District created
- Succeeded by: District abolished

Member of the New York State Assembly from Erie's 1st district
- In office January 1, 1959 – December 31, 1965
- Preceded by: Thomas J. Runfola
- Succeeded by: District abolished

Personal details
- Born: December 2, 1919 Buffalo, New York
- Died: February 21, 2000 (aged 80)
- Party: Democratic

Stephen R. Greco (December 2, 1919 – February 21, 2000) was an American politician who served in the New York State Assembly from 1959 to 1980.
