= Stanley Harwood =

American politician

Member of the New York State Assembly from the 11th district
- In office January 1, 1967 – December 31, 1972
- Preceded by: Joseph M. Reilly
- Succeeded by: Philip B. Healey

Member of the New York State Assembly from the 10th district
- In office January 1, 1966 – December 31, 1966
- Preceded by: District created
- Succeeded by: Milton Jonas

Personal details
- Born: June 23, 1926 Brooklyn, New York City, New York
- Died: August 20, 2010 (aged 84)
- Party: Democratic

Stanley Harwood (June 23, 1926 – August 20, 2010) was an American politician who served in the New York State Assembly from 1966 to 1972.

He died of lung cancer on August 20, 2010, at age 84.
