= Joseph J. Kunzeman =

American politician

Member of the New York State Assembly from the 20th district
- In office January 1, 1967 – September 15, 1971
- Preceded by: Eli Wager
- Succeeded by: John A. Esposito

Member of the New York State Assembly from the 29th district
- In office January 1, 1966 – December 31, 1966
- Preceded by: District created
- Succeeded by: Frederick D. Schmidt

Personal details
- Born: September 1, 1927 Queens, New York City, New York
- Died: May 2, 2008 (aged 80) Jericho, New York
- Party: Republican

Joseph J. Kunzeman (September 1, 1927 – May 2, 2008) was an American politician who served in the New York State Assembly from 1966 to 1971.

He died on May 2, 2008, in Jericho, New York at age 80.
