= Ferdinand J. Mondello =

American politician (1906–1992)

Member of the New York State Assembly from the 80th district
- In office January 1, 1967 – December 31, 1972
- Preceded by: Orest V. Maresca
- Succeeded by: Guy J. Velella

Member of the New York State Assembly from the 94th district
- In office January 1, 1966 – December 31, 1966
- Preceded by: District created
- Succeeded by: Joseph T. St. Lawrence

Member of the New York State Assembly from The Bronx's 10th district
- In office January 1, 1961 – December 31, 1965
- Preceded by: George W. Harrington
- Succeeded by: District abolished

Personal details
- Born: November 5, 1906 New York City, New York, U.S.
- Died: March 10, 1992 (aged 85)
- Party: Democratic

Ferdinand J. Mondello (November 5, 1906 – March 10, 1992) was an American politician who served in the New York State Assembly from 1961 to 1972.
