= Clark C. Wemple =

American politician (1927–1993)

Member of the New York State Assembly from the 107th district
- In office January 1, 1973 – December 31, 1982
- Preceded by: Lawrence E. Corbett Jr.
- Succeeded by: Jim Tedisco

Member of the New York State Assembly from the 105th district
- In office January 1, 1967 – December 31, 1972
- Preceded by: District created
- Succeeded by: Charles D. Cook

Member of the New York State Assembly from the 117th district
- In office January 1, 1966 – December 31, 1966
- Preceded by: District created
- Succeeded by: Edward F. Crawford

Personal details
- Born: July 19, 1927 Schenectady, New York, U.S.
- Died: February 1, 1993 (aged 65)
- Party: Republican

Clark C. Wemple (July 19, 1927 – February 1, 1993) was an American politician who served in the New York State Assembly from 1966 to 1982. He was a descendant of one of the original founders of the city of Schenectady. One of his sons is the journalist Erik Wemple.
