= George E. Van Cott =

American politician

Member of the New York State Assembly from the 88th district
- In office January 1, 1967 – July 9, 1972
- Preceded by: Alexander Chananau
- Succeeded by: Richard C. Ross

Member of the New York State Assembly from the 99th district
- In office January 1, 1966 – December 31, 1966
- Preceded by: District created
- Succeeded by: Kenneth L. Wilson

Member of the New York State Assembly from Westchester's 3rd district
- In office January 1, 1961 – December 31, 1965
- Preceded by: Frances K. Marlatt
- Succeeded by: District abolished

Personal details
- Born: June 16, 1906 Mount Vernon, New York
- Died: July 9, 1972 (aged 66) Manhattan, New York City, New York
- Party: Republican

George E. Van Cott (June 16, 1906 – July 9, 1972) was an American politician who served in the New York State Assembly from 1961 to 1972.

He died on July 9, 1972, in Manhattan, New York City, New York at age 66.
