= 180th New York State Legislature =

New York state legislative session

←	179th	181st	→
- New York State Capitol (2009)

Overview
- Legislative body: New York State Legislature
- Jurisdiction: New York, United States
- Term: January 1, 1973 – December 31, 1974

Senate
- Members: 60
- President: Lt. Gov. Malcolm Wilson (R), until December 18, 1973
- Temporary President: Warren M. Anderson (R)
- Party control: Republican; 1973: (37–23); 1974: (37–22)

Assembly
- Members: 150
- Speaker: Perry B. Duryea Jr. (R)
- Party control: Republican; 1973: (82–67–1); 1974: (79–70–1)

Sessions
- 1st: January 3 – May 28, 1973
- 2nd: July 25 – 31, 1973
- 3rd: January 9 – May 17, 1974
- 4th: May 29 – 30, 1974

The 180th New York State Legislature, consisting of the New York State Senate and the New York State Assembly, met from January 3, 1973, to May 30, 1974, during the fifteenth and final year of Nelson Rockefeller's governorship, and during Malcolm Wilson's governorship, in Albany.

== Background ==
Under the provisions of the New York Constitution of 1938, and the U.S. Supreme Court decision to follow the One man, one vote rule, re-apportioned in 1971 by the legislature, 60 senators and 150 assemblymen were elected in single-seat districts for two-year terms. Senate and Assembly districts consisted of approximately the same number of inhabitants, the area being apportioned without restrictions regarding county boundaries.

At this time there were two major political parties: the Republican Party and the Democratic Party. The Conservative Party and the Liberal Party also nominated tickets.

== Elections ==
The 1972 New York state election was held on November 7. The only three statewide elective offices up for election were three seats on the New York Court of Appeals. All three seats were won by Republican judges, two with Conservative endorsement, and one with Liberal endorsement. The approximate party strength at this election, as expressed by the average vote for Judge of the Court of Appeals, was: Republicans 2,847,000; Democrats 2,709,000; Conservatives 425,000; and Liberals 258,000. To date this was the last time a Republican majority was elected to the State Assembly.

Of the three women members of the previous legislature, Assemblywoman Mary Anne Krupsak (Dem.), a lawyer of Amsterdam, was elected to the state Senate; and Assemblywomen Constance E. Cook (Rep.), a lawyer of Ithaca; and Rosemary R. Gunning (Cons.), a lawyer of Ridgewood, Queens; were re-elected to the assembly. Karen Burstein, a lawyer of Lawrence, and Carol Bellamy, a lawyer of Brooklyn, were also elected to the state Senate; and Estella B. Diggs, of the Bronx, was also elected to the assembly.

The 1973 New York state election was held on November 6. The only statewide elective office up for election was the Chief Judge of the New York Court of Appeals. Republican Charles D. Breitel was elected with Liberal endorsement. One vacancy in the State Senate and five vacancies in the Assembly were filled. Elizabeth Connelly (Dem.), of Staten Island, was elected to the assembly.

== Sessions ==
The legislature met for the first regular session (the 196th) at the State Capitol in Albany on January 3, 1973; and adjourned sine die on May 28.

Perry B. Duryea Jr. (Rep.) was re-elected Speaker.

Warren M. Anderson (Rep.) was elected temporary president of the state Senate.

The legislature met for a special session at the State Capitol in Albany on July 25, 1973; and adjourned sine die on July 31. This session was called to consider the issue of a $3.5 million bond issue to finance the construction of additional public transportation capacities in New York City.

The legislature met for the second regular session (the 197th) at the State Capitol in Albany on January 9, 1974; and adjourned sine die in the early morning of May 17.

The U.S. Department of Justice found fault with the congressional, senatorial and Assembly districts in Manhattan and Brooklyn under the apportionment of 1971, and ordered a revision to safeguard the rights of minorities.

The legislature met for another special session at the State Capitol in Albany on May 29, 1974; and adjourned sine die on the next day. This session was called to remap the legislative districts in Manhattan and Brooklyn, and to amend the rent-control law passed during the regular session. The Senate passed Governor Wilson's rent law amendment, but the Assembly did not come to a vote on it.

On July 1, the U.S. Department of Justice accepted the revised districts as passed by the legislature.

== State Senate ==
=== Senators ===
The asterisk (*) denotes members of the previous Legislature who continued in office as members of this Legislature. Chester J. Straub, Vander L. Beatty, Joseph R. Pisani, Mary Anne Krupsak, Edwyn E. Mason and James T. McFarland changed from the Assembly to the Senate at the beginning of the session.

Note: For brevity, the chairmanships omit the words "...the Committee on (the)..."

District	Senator	Party	Notes
1st	Leon E. Giuffreda*	Republican	Chairman of Education
2nd	Bernard C. Smith*	Republican	
3rd	Caesar Trunzo	Republican	
4th	Owen H. Johnson	Republican	
5th	Ralph J. Marino*	Republican	
6th	John R. Dunne*	Republican	
7th	John D. Caemmerer*	Republican	
8th	Norman J. Levy*	Republican	
9th	Karen Burstein	Democrat	
10th	John J. Santucci*	Democrat	
11th	Frank Padavan	Rep./Cons.	
12th	Jack E. Bronston*	Dem./Lib.	
13th	Emanuel R. Gold*	Dem./Lib.	
14th	Nicholas Ferraro*	Democrat	on November 6, 1973, elected D.A. of Queens County
14th	John J. Moore	Democrat	on February 14, 1974, elected to fill vacancy
15th	Martin J. Knorr*	Rep./Cons.	
16th	A. Frederick Meyerson*	Democrat	
17th	Chester J. Straub*	Democrat	
18th	Vander L. Beatty*	Democrat	
19th	Jeremiah B. Bloom*	Democrat	
20th	Donald Halperin*	Democrat	
21st	William T. Conklin*	Rep./Cons.	Deputy Majority Leader
22nd	Albert B. Lewis*	Democrat	
23rd	Carol Bellamy	Democrat	
24th	John J. Marchi*	Republican	Chairman of Finance
25th	Paul P. E. Bookson*	Democrat	
26th	Roy M. Goodman*	Rep./Lib.	
27th	Manfred Ohrenstein*	Dem./Lib.	
28th	Sidney A. von Luther*	Dem./Lib.	
29th	Joseph Zaretzki*	Dem./Lib.	Minority Leader
30th	Robert García*	Dem./Rep./Lib.	
31st	Harrison J. Goldin*	Dem./Lib.	on November 6, 1973, elected New York City Comptroller
31st	The seat remained vacant throughout the session of 1974		
32nd	Joseph L. Galiber*	Dem./Rep./Lib.	
33rd	Abraham Bernstein*	Dem./Lib.	
34th	John D. Calandra*	Rep./Dem./Cons.	
35th	John E. Flynn*	Republican	
36th	Joseph R. Pisani*	Republican	
37th	Bernard G. Gordon*	Rep./Cons.	
38th	Donald R. Ackerson	Republican	
39th	Jay P. Rolison Jr.*	Rep./Cons.	
40th	Richard E. Schermerhorn*	Rep./Cons.	
41st	Douglas Hudson*	Republican	
42nd	Walter B. Langley*	Republican	
43rd	Ronald B. Stafford*	Rep./Cons.	
44th	Mary Anne Krupsak*	Dem./Lib.	on November 5, 1974, elected Lieutenant Governor of New York
45th	Hugh Douglas Barclay*	Republican	
46th	James H. Donovan*	Rep./Cons.	
47th	Warren M. Anderson*	Republican	elected Temporary President; acting as Lt. Gov. from December 18, 1973
48th	Edwyn E. Mason*	Rep./Cons.	
49th	Martin S. Auer	Republican	
50th	Tarky Lombardi Jr.*	Rep./Cons.	
51st	William T. Smith*	Rep./Cons.	
52nd	Frederick L. Warder*	Republican	
53rd	Gordon J. DeHond	Rep./Cons.	
54th	Fred J. Eckert	Rep./Cons.	
55th	Frank J. Glinski*	Dem./Lib.	resigned in 1973
55th	Joseph A. Tauriello	Democrat	on November 6, 1973, elected to fill vacancy
56th	James D. Griffin*	Dem./Cons.	
57th	Jess J. Present*	Republican	
58th	Thomas F. McGowan*	Rep./Cons.	
59th	James T. McFarland*	Rep./Cons.	
60th	Lloyd H. Paterson	Rep./Lib.	

=== Employees ===
- Secretary: Albert J. Abrams

== State Assembly ==
=== Assemblymen ===
The asterisk (*) denotes members of the previous Legislature who continued in office as members of this Legislature. George A. Murphy and John J. LaFalce changed from the Senate to the Assembly at the beginning of the session.

Note: For brevity, the chairmanships omit the words "...the Committee on (the)..."

District	Assemblymen	Party	Notes
1st	Perry B. Duryea Jr.*	Republican	re-elected Speaker
2nd	Peter J. Costigan*	Republican	
3rd	Icilio W. Bianchi Jr.	Democrat	
4th	Robert C. Wertz*	Republican	
5th	Dennis O'Doherty	Republican	
6th	John C. Cochrane	Republican	
7th	John J. Flanagan	Republican	
8th	John G. McCarthy*	Republican	
9th	William L. Burns*	Republican	
10th	Stuart R. Levine	Republican	
11th	Philip B. Healey*	Republican	
12th	George A. Murphy*	Republican	
13th	Milton Jonas*	Republican	
14th	Joseph M. Reilly*	Republican	
15th	John E. Kingston*	Republican	Majority Leader
16th	Irwin J. Landes*	Democrat	
17th	Joseph M. Margiotta*	Republican	
18th	Armand P. D'Amato	Republican	
19th	John S. Thorp Jr.*	Democrat	
20th	Arthur J. Kremer*	Democrat	
21st	George J. Farrell Jr.*	Republican	
22nd	Herbert A. Posner*	Democrat	
23rd	John A. Esposito*	Rep./Cons.	
24th	Saul Weprin*	Democrat	
25th	Vincent F. Nicolosi	Democrat	
26th	Leonard P. Stavisky*	Democrat	
27th	Arthur J. Cooperman*	Dem./Lib.	
28th	Alan G. Hevesi*	Democrat	
29th	Guy R. Brewer*	Democrat	
30th	Herbert J. Miller*	Democrat	
31st	Alfred A. DelliBovi*	Rep./Cons.	
32nd	Edward Abramson	Democrat	
33rd	John T. Flack*	Rep./Cons.	
34th	Joseph F. Lisa*	Democrat	
35th	John G. Lopresto*	Rep./Cons.	
36th	Joseph S. Calabretta*	Democrat	on November 6, 1973, elected to the New York City Civil Court
36th	Anthony V. Gazzara	Democrat	on February 14, 1974, elected to fill vacancy
37th	Rosemary R. Gunning*	Cons./Rep.	
38th	Vito P. Battista*	Rep./Cons.	
39th	Stanley Fink*	Democrat	
40th	Edward Griffith	Democrat	
41st	Stanley Steingut*	Democrat	Minority Leader
42nd	Brian Sharoff*	Dem./Lib.	
43rd	George A. Cincotta*	Democrat	
44th	Mel Miller*	Democrat	
45th	Stephen J. Solarz*	Dem./Lib.	
46th	Howard L. Lasher	Democrat	
47th	Frank J. Barbaro	Democrat	
48th	Leonard Silverman*	Democrat	
49th	Dominick L. DiCarlo*	Rep./Cons.	
50th	Robert F. Kelly*	Rep./Cons.	appointed as Chairman of the NYS Cable TV Commission
50th	Christopher J. Mega	Rep./Cons.	on November 6, 1973, elected to fill vacancy
51st	Vincent A. Riccio*	Rep./Cons.	
52nd	Michael L. Pesce	Democrat	
53rd	Woodrow Lewis	Democrat	
54th	Samuel D. Wright*	Dem./Rep./Lib.	resigned to run for the New York City Council
54th	Charles T. Hamilton	Democrat	on November 6, 1973, elected to fill vacancy
55th	Thomas R. Fortune*	Democrat	
56th	Calvin Williams*	Dem./Lib.	
57th	Harvey L. Strelzin*	Democrat	
58th	Joseph R. Lentol	Democrat	
59th	Peter G. Mirto*	Democrat	
60th	Lucio F. Russo*	Rep./Cons.	
61st	Edward J. Amann Jr.*	Rep./Cons.	appointed to the New York Court of Claims
61st	Elizabeth Connelly	Dem./Cons.	on November 6, 1973, elected to fill vacancy
62nd	Louis DeSalvio*	Democrat	
63rd	Anthony G. DiFalco*	Dem./Lib.	
64th	William F. Passannante*	Dem./Lib.	
65th	Andrew J. Stein*	Dem./Lib.	
66th	Antonio G. Olivieri*	Dem./Lib.	
67th	Richard N. Gottfried*	Dem./Lib.	
68th	Peter A. A. Berle*	Dem./Lib.	
69th	Albert H. Blumenthal*	Dem./Lib.	
70th	Jesse Gray	Democrat	
71st	Franz S. Leichter*	Dem./Lib.	
72nd	George W. Miller*	Dem./Lib.	
73rd	Edward H. Lehner	Democrat	
74th	Mark T. Southall*	Democrat	
75th	Eugenio Alvarez	Democrat	in 1974 appointed as Deputy NYC Commissioner of Housing Supervision
76th	Seymour Posner*	Dem./Lib.	
77th	Armando Montano*	Dem./Rep./Lib.	
78th	Estella B. Diggs	Democrat	
79th	Louis Niñé*	Democrat	
80th	Guy Velella	Rep./Cons.	
81st	Alan Hochberg*	Dem./Lib.	
82nd	Thomas J. Culhane	Democrat	
83rd	Burton Hecht*	Dem./Lib.	
84th	G. Oliver Koppell*	Dem./Lib.	
85th	(Anthony J. Mercorella)*	Dem./Lib.	resigned on January 3 and took a seat in the New York City Council
85th	John C. Dearie	Democrat	on February 27, 1973, elected to fill vacancy
86th	Anthony J. Stella*	Dem./Lib.	
87th	Bruce F. Caputo	Rep./Cons.	
88th	Richard C. Ross	Rep./Cons.	
89th	Alvin M. Suchin*	Rep./Cons.	
90th	Gordon W. Burrows*	Rep./Cons.	
91st	Richard E. Mannix	Rep./Cons.	
92nd	J. Edward Meyer*	Rep./Cons.	elected as a Republican with Conservative endorsement
92nd	J. Edward Meyer*	Democrat	on December 4, 1973, became a Democrat
93rd	Peter R. Biondo*	Republican	
94th	Willis H. Stephens*	Republican	Chairman of Ways and Means
95th	Eugene Levy*	Rep./Cons.	
96th	Harold K. Grune	Rep./Cons.	
97th	Lawrence Herbst*	Republican	
98th	Louis Ingrassia	Republican	
99th	Emeel S. Betros*	Rep./Cons.	
100th	Benjamin P. Roosa Jr.	Republican	
101st	H. Clark Bell*	Rep./Cons.	
102nd	Clarence D. Lane*	Republican	
103rd	Fred G. Field Jr.*	Republican	
104th	Thomas W. Brown*	Democrat	
105th	Charles D. Cook	Republican	
106th	Neil W. Kelleher*	Rep./Cons.	
107th	Clark C. Wemple*	Rep./Cons.	
108th	Fred W. Droms Jr.*	Rep./Cons.	
109th	Glenn H. Harris*	Rep./Cons./Lib.	
110th	Gerald B. H. Solomon	Rep./Cons.	
111th	Andrew W. Ryan Jr.*	Rep./Cons.	
112th	K. Daniel Haley*	Dem./Lib.	
113th	Harold C. Luther	Republican	died on May 15, 1973
113th	Peter S. Dokuchitz	Republican	on November 6, 1973, elected to fill vacancy
114th	Donald L. Taylor*	Rep./Cons.	
115th	William R. Sears*	Republican	
116th	Nicholas J. Calogero	Republican	
117th	Edward F. Crawford*	Rep./Cons.	Chairman of Judiciary; on November 6, 1973, elected to the New York Supreme Court
117th	Ralph Shapiro	Dem./Cons.	on February 14, 1974, elected to fill vacancy; died on April 8, 1974
118th	Leonard F. Bersani*	Rep./Cons.	
119th	Hyman M. Miller*	Republican	
120th	Edward M. Kinsella*	Rep./Cons.	died on December 3, 1973
120th	Rocco Pirro	Republican	on February 14, 1974, elected to fill vacancy
121st	Thomas J. Murphy*	Rep./Cons.	
122nd	Clarence D. Rappleyea Jr.	Republican	
123rd	James W. McCabe	Democrat	
124th	Francis J. Boland Jr.*	Rep./Cons.	
125th	Lloyd Stephen Riford Jr.*	Rep./Cons.	
126th	L. Richard Marshall*	Rep./Cons.	
127th	Charles D. Henderson*	Republican	
128th	Constance E. Cook*	Republican	
129th	James F. Hurley	Rep./Cons.	
130th	Thomas A. Hanna	Rep./Cons.	
131st	Raymond J. Lill*	Democrat	
132nd	Thomas R. Frey	Democrat	
133rd	Frank A. Carroll*	Rep./Cons.	
134th	William M. Steinfeldt*	Rep./Cons.	
135th	Don W. Cook*	Rep./Cons.	
136th	James L. Emery*	Republican	
137th	William C. Knights	Republican	died on February 5, 1973
137th	R. Stephen Hawley	Republican	on November 6, 1973, elected to fill vacancy
138th	John B. Daly	Republican	
139th	Richard J. Hogan*	Rep./Cons.	
140th	John J. LaFalce*	Dem./Lib.	on November 5, 1974, elected to the 94th U.S. Congress
141st	Chester R. Hardt*	Rep./Cons.	
142nd	Stephen R. Greco*	Dem./Cons.	
143rd	Arthur O. Eve*	Democrat	
144th	Albert J. Hausbeck*	Rep./Cons.	
145th	Francis J. Griffin*	Dem./Lib.	
146th	Alan J. Justin	Rep./Cons.	
147th	Ronald H. Tills*	Rep./Cons.	
148th	Dale M. Volker	Republican	
149th	Daniel B. Walsh	Dem./Lib.	
150th	John W. Beckman*	Rep./Cons.	

=== Employees ===
- Clerk: Donald A. Campbell, until February 1973, resigned
  - Thomas H. Bartzos, acting from February 1973, appointed as clerk in January 1974

== Sources ==
- Listing Of New York Metropolitan Area Legislators and Names. Addresses Of Upstate Legislators in the Civil Service Leader (Vol. XXXIV, No. 5; issue of May 1, 1973; pg. 8f)
- Six Seats in State Legislature To Be Filled in Tuesday Voting in the Amsterdam Recorder, of Amsterdam, on November 5, 1973
- Listing of New York Congressmen and Legislators in the Civil Service Leader (Vol. XXXIV, No. 50; issue of March 12, 1974; pg. 8f)
