= 181st New York State Legislature =

New York state legislative session

←	180th	182nd	→
- New York State Capitol (2009)

Overview
- Legislative body: New York State Legislature
- Jurisdiction: New York, United States
- Term: January 1, 1975 – December 31, 1976

Senate
- Members: 60
- President: Lt. Gov. Mary Anne Krupsak (D)
- Temporary President: Warren M. Anderson (R)
- Party control: Republican (34–26)

Assembly
- Members: 150
- Speaker: Stanley Steingut (D)
- Party control: Democratic (88–61–1)

Sessions
- 1st: January 8 – July 12, 1975
- 2nd: September 4 – 9, 1975
- 3rd: November 13 – December 20, 1975
- 4th: January 7 – June 30, 1976
- 5th: August 4 – 5, 1976

The 181st New York State Legislature, consisting of the New York State Senate and the New York State Assembly, met from January 8, 1975, to August 5, 1976, during the first and second years of Hugh Carey's governorship in Albany.

== Background ==
The U.S. Department of Justice found fault with the congressional, senatorial and Assembly districts in Manhattan and Brooklyn under the apportionment of 1971, and ordered a revision to safeguard the rights of minorities. The legislature enacted an amendment to the 1971 apportionment, remapping the legislative districts in Manhattan and Brooklyn, during a special session on May 29 and 30, 1974. On July 1, the U.S. Department of Justice accepted the revised districts as passed by the legislature.

Thus, under the provisions of the New York Constitution of 1938 and the U.S. Supreme Court decision to follow the One man, one vote rule, re-apportioned in 1971, and amended in 1974, by the legislature, 60 Senators and 150 assemblymen were elected in single-seat districts for two-year terms. Senate and Assembly districts consisted of approximately the same number of inhabitants, the area being apportioned without restrictions regarding county boundaries.

At this time there were two major political parties: the Republican Party and the Democratic Party. The Conservative Party, the Liberal Party, the Courage Party, the Free Libertarian Party, the Socialist Workers Party, the Communist Party, the Socialist Labor Party and the Labor Party also nominated tickets.

== Elections ==
The 1974 New York state election was held on November 5. Congressman Hugh Carey and State Senator Mary Anne Krupsak were elected Governor and Lieutenant Governor, both Democrats. Carey defeated the incumbent Governor Malcolm Wilson. The elections to the other five statewide elective offices resulted in a Republican Attorney General with Liberal endorsement; a Democratic State Comptroller with Liberal endorsement; a Republican U.S. Senator with Liberal endorsement; and two Democratic judges of the Court of Appeals, one of them with Liberal endorsement. The approximate party strength at this election, as expressed by the vote for Governor, was: Democrats/Liberals 3,029,000; Republicans/Conservatives 2,220,000; Courage 12,500; Free Libertarians 10,500; Socialist Workers 9,000; Communists 5,000; Socialist Labor 4,500; and Labor 3,000. Gathering from the results for the other offices, the strength of the Liberals was about 400,000 votes, and the Conservatives about 250,000. However, Conservative Barbara A. Keating polled more than 800,000 votes for U.S. Senator.

Of the seven women members of the previous legislature, State Senator Mary Anne Krupsak (Dem.), a lawyer of Amsterdam, was elected Lieutenant Governor of New York, and became ex officio president of the state Senate; and five of the other six—State Senators Karen Burstein, a lawyer of Lawrence, and Carol Bellamy, a lawyer of Brooklyn; and Assemblywomen Elizabeth Connelly (Dem.), of Staten Island; Estella B. Diggs, of the Bronx; and Rosemary R. Gunning (Cons.), a lawyer of Ridgewood, Queens—were re-elected. Linda Winikow, of Spring Valley, was also elected to the state Senate. Jean Amatucci (Dem.), a registered nurse of White Lake; Mary B. Goodhue (Rep.), a lawyer of Mount Kisco; and Marie M. Runyon (Dem.), of Manhattan, were also elected to the assembly.

The 1975 New York state election was held on November 4. No statewide elective offices were up for election. One vacancy was filled in the Legislature: Jeannette Gadson, of Brooklyn, was elected to the assembly.

On February 10, 1976, Gerdi E. Lipschutz (Dem.), of Queens, was elected to fill a vacancy in the Assembly, making her the eleventh woman member of the Legislature of 1976, surpassing the previous record of eight in the 166th New York State Legislature (1947–1948).

== Sessions ==
The legislature met for the first regular session (the 198th) at the State Capitol in Albany on January 8, 1975; and adjourned sine die in the morning of July 12.

Stanley Steingut (Dem.) was elected Speaker.

Warren M. Anderson (Rep.) was re-elected temporary president of the state Senate.

The legislature met for a special session at the State Capitol in Albany on September 4, 1975; and adjourned sine die in the early morning of September 9. This session was called to take measures concerning the financial crisis of New York City.

The legislature met for another special session at the State Capitol in Albany on November 13, 1975. On November 25, a help package worth $200 million was enacted to avert the financial breakdown of New York City. They adjourned sine die on December 20, after enacting an increase of $600 million in state taxes.

The legislature met for the second regular session (the 199th) at the State Capitol in Albany on January 7, 1976; and adjourned sine die in the morning of June 30.

The legislature met for yet another special session at the State Capitol in Albany on August 4, 1976; and adjourned sine die on the next day. This session was called to consider Governor Carey's proposed court reform.

== State Senate ==
=== Senators ===
The asterisk (*) denotes members of the previous Legislature who continued in office as members of this Legislature. Franz S. Leichter changed from the Assembly to the Senate at the beginning of the session. Assemblyman Anthony V. Gazzara was elected to fill a vacancy in the Senate.

Note: For brevity, the chairmanships omit the words "...the Committee on (the)..."

District	Senator	Party	Notes
1st	Leon E. Giuffreda*	Republican	
2nd	Bernard C. Smith*	Republican	
3rd	Caesar Trunzo*	Republican	
4th	Owen H. Johnson*	Republican	
5th	Ralph J. Marino*	Republican	
6th	John R. Dunne*	Republican	
7th	John D. Caemmerer*	Republican	
8th	Norman J. Levy*	Republican	
9th	Karen Burstein*	Democrat	
10th	John J. Santucci*	Democrat	on December 30, 1976, appointed as D.A. of Queens County
11th	Frank Padavan*	Republican	
12th	Jack E. Bronston*	Democrat	
13th	Emanuel R. Gold*	Democrat	
14th	John J. Moore*	Democrat	died on January 18, 1976
14th	Anthony V. Gazzara*	Democrat	on March 2, 1976, elected to fill vacancy
15th	Martin J. Knorr*	Republican	
16th	A. Frederick Meyerson*	Democrat	in March 1976, appointed to the New York City Criminal Court
16th	Howard E. Babbush	Democrat	on April 27, 1976, elected to fill vacancy
17th	Major Owens	Democrat	
18th	Chester J. Straub*	Democrat	resigned in December 1975
18th	Thomas J. Bartosiewicz	Democrat	on February 10, 1976, elected to fill vacancy
19th	Jeremiah B. Bloom*	Democrat	
20th	Donald Halperin*	Democrat	
21st	William T. Conklin*	Republican	Deputy Majority Leader
22nd	Albert B. Lewis*	Democrat	
23rd	Vander L. Beatty*	Democrat	
24th	John J. Marchi*	Republican	Chairman of Finance
25th	Carol Bellamy*	Democrat	
26th	Roy M. Goodman*	Republican	
27th	Manfred Ohrenstein*	Democrat	Minority Leader
28th	Carl McCall	Democrat	
29th	Franz S. Leichter*	Democrat	
30th	Robert García*	Democrat	
31st	Israel Ruiz Jr.	Democrat	
32nd	Joseph L. Galiber*	Democrat	
33rd	Abraham Bernstein*	Democrat	
34th	John D. Calandra*	Republican	
35th	John E. Flynn*	Republican	
36th	Joseph R. Pisani*	Republican	
37th	Bernard G. Gordon*	Republican	
38th	Linda Winikow	Democrat	
39th	Jay P. Rolison Jr.*	Republican	
40th	Richard E. Schermerhorn*	Republican	
41st	Douglas Hudson*	Republican	
42nd	Howard C. Nolan Jr.	Democrat	
43rd	Ronald B. Stafford*	Republican	
44th	Fred Isabella	Democrat	
45th	Hugh Douglas Barclay*	Republican	
46th	James H. Donovan*	Republican	
47th	Warren M. Anderson*	Republican	re-elected Temporary President
48th	Edwyn E. Mason*	Republican	
49th	Martin S. Auer*	Republican	
50th	Tarky Lombardi Jr.*	Republican	
51st	William T. Smith*	Republican	
52nd	Frederick L. Warder*	Republican	
53rd	John D. Perry	Democrat	
54th	Fred J. Eckert*	Republican	
55th	Joseph A. Tauriello*	Democrat	
56th	James D. Griffin*	Democrat	
57th	Jess J. Present*	Republican	
58th	vacant	Senator-elect Thomas F. McGowan (R) was appointed to the New York Supreme Court	
58th	Dale M. Volker	Republican	on February 4, 1975, elected to fill vacancy
59th	James T. McFarland*	Republican	
60th	Lloyd H. Paterson*	Republican	

=== Employees ===
- Secretary: Albert J. Abrams, resigned 1976
  - Roger C. Thompson, in 1976

== State Assembly ==
=== Assemblymen ===
The asterisk (*) denotes members of the previous Legislature who continued in office as members of this Legislature.

Note: For brevity, the chairmanships omit the words "...the Committee on (the)..."

District	Assemblymen	Party	Notes
1st	Perry B. Duryea Jr.*	Republican	Minority Leader
2nd	George J. Hochbrueckner	Democrat	
3rd	Icilio W. Bianchi Jr.*	Democrat	
4th	Robert C. Wertz*	Republican	
5th	Paul E. Harenberg	Democrat	
6th	John C. Cochrane*	Republican	
7th	John J. Flanagan*	Republican	
8th	Regis B. O'Neil Jr.	Republican	
9th	William L. Burns*	Republican	
10th	Lewis J. Yevoli	Democrat	
11th	Philip B. Healey*	Republican	
12th	George A. Murphy*	Republican	
13th	Milton Jonas*	Republican	
14th	Joseph M. Reilly*	Republican	
15th	Angelo F. Orazio	Democrat	
16th	Irwin J. Landes*	Democrat	
17th	Joseph M. Margiotta*	Republican	
18th	Armand P. D'Amato*	Republican	
19th	John S. Thorp Jr.*	Democrat	
20th	Arthur J. Kremer*	Democrat	
21st	Henry W. Dwyer	Republican	
22nd	Herbert A. Posner*	Democrat	on November 4, 1975, elected to the New York City Civil Court
22nd	Gerdi E. Lipschutz	Democrat	on February 10, 1976, elected to fill vacancy
23rd	John A. Esposito*	Republican	
24th	Saul Weprin*	Democrat	
25th	Vincent F. Nicolosi*	Democrat	
26th	Leonard P. Stavisky*	Democrat	
27th	Arthur J. Cooperman*	Democrat	
28th	Alan G. Hevesi*	Democrat	
29th	Guy R. Brewer*	Democrat	
30th	Herbert J. Miller*	Democrat	
31st	Alfred A. DelliBovi*	Republican	
32nd	Edward Abramson*	Democrat	
33rd	John T. Flack*	Republican	
34th	Joseph F. Lisa*	Democrat	
35th	John G. Lopresto*	Republican	
36th	Anthony V. Gazzara*	Democrat	on March 2, 1976, elected to the State Senate
36th	Denis J. Butler	Democrat	on April 27, 1976, elected to fill vacancy
37th	Rosemary R. Gunning*	Cons./Rep.	
38th	Frederick D. Schmidt	Democrat	
39th	Stanley Fink*	Democrat	
40th	Edward Griffith*	Democrat	
41st	Stanley Steingut*	Democrat	elected Speaker
42nd	Brian Sharoff*	Democrat	
43rd	George A. Cincotta*	Democrat	
44th	Mel Miller*	Democrat	
45th	Chuck Schumer	Democrat	
46th	Howard L. Lasher*	Democrat	
47th	Frank J. Barbaro*	Democrat	
48th	Leonard Silverman*	Democrat	
49th	Dominick L. DiCarlo*	Republican	
50th	Christopher J. Mega*	Republican	
51st	Joseph Ferris	Democrat	
52nd	Michael L. Pesce*	Democrat	
53rd	Woodrow Lewis*	Democrat	
54th	Charles T. Hamilton*	Democrat	resigned
54th	Jeannette Gadson	Democrat	on November 4, 1975, elected to fill vacancy
55th	Thomas R. Fortune*	Democrat	
56th	Albert Vann	Democrat	
57th	Harvey L. Strelzin*	Democrat	
58th	Joseph R. Lentol*	Democrat	
59th	Peter G. Mirto*	Democrat	
60th	Guy Molinari	Republican	
61st	Elizabeth Connelly*	Democrat	
62nd	Louis DeSalvio*	Democrat	
63rd	Anthony G. DiFalco*	Democrat	
64th	William F. Passannante*	Democrat	
65th	Andrew J. Stein*	Democrat	
66th	Mark Alan Siegel	Democrat	
67th	Richard N. Gottfried*	Democrat	
68th	Alexander B. Grannis	Democrat	
69th	Albert H. Blumenthal*	Democrat	Majority Leader
70th	Marie M. Runyon	Democrat	
71st	George W. Miller*	Democrat	
72nd	Angelo Del Toro	Democrat	
73rd	Edward H. Lehner*	Democrat	
74th	Herman D. Farrell Jr.	Democrat	
75th	José E. Serrano	Democrat	
76th	Seymour Posner*	Democrat	
77th	Armando Montano*	Democrat	
78th	Estella B. Diggs*	Democrat	
79th	Louis Niñé*	Democrat	
80th	Guy J. Velella*	Republican	
81st	Alan Hochberg*	Democrat	
82nd	Thomas J. Culhane*	Democrat	
83rd	Burton Hecht*	Democrat	Chairman of Ways and Means; on November 2, 1976, elected to the New York City Civil Court
84th	G. Oliver Koppell*	Democrat	
85th	John C. Dearie*	Democrat	
86th	Vincent A. Marchiselli	Democrat	
87th	Bruce F. Caputo*	Republican	on November 2, 1976, elected to the 95th U.S. Congress
88th	Richard C. Ross*	Republican	
89th	Alvin M. Suchin*	Republican	
90th	Gordon W. Burrows*	Republican	
91st	Richard E. Mannix*	Republican	
92nd	Peter M. Sullivan	Republican	
93rd	Mary B. Goodhue	Republican	
94th	Willis H. Stephens*	Republican	
95th	Eugene Levy*	Republican	
96th	Robert J. Connor	Democrat	
97th	Lawrence Herbst*	Republican	
98th	Jean Amatucci	Democrat	
99th	Emeel S. Betros*	Republican	
100th	Benjamin P. Roosa Jr.*	Republican	
101st	Maurice D. Hinchey	Democrat	
102nd	Clarence D. Lane*	Republican	
103rd	Fred G. Field Jr.*	Republican	
104th	Thomas W. Brown*	Democrat	
105th	Charles D. Cook*	Republican	
106th	Neil W. Kelleher*	Republican	
107th	Clark C. Wemple*	Republican	
108th	Robert A. D'Andrea	Republican	
109th	Glenn H. Harris*	Republican	
110th	Gerald B. H. Solomon*	Republican	
111th	Andrew W. Ryan Jr.*	Republican	
112th	K. Daniel Haley*	Democrat	
113th	Peter S. Dokuchitz*	Republican	
114th	Donald L. Taylor*	Republican	
115th	William R. Sears*	Republican	
116th	Nicholas J. Calogero*	Republican	
117th	John R. Zagame	Republican	
118th	Ronald A. Stott	Democrat	
119th	Hyman M. Miller*	Republican	
120th	Melvin N. Zimmer	Dem./Cons.	
121st	Thomas J. Murphy*	Republican	
122nd	Clarence D. Rappleyea Jr.*	Republican	
123rd	James W. McCabe	Democrat	
124th	James R. Tallon Jr.	Democrat	
125th	Lloyd Stephen Riford Jr.*	Republican	
126th	L. Richard Marshall*	Republican	
127th	Charles D. Henderson*	Republican	
128th	Gary A. Lee	Republican	
129th	James F. Hurley*	Republican	
130th	Thomas A. Hanna*	Republican	
131st	Raymond J. Lill*	Democrat	
132nd	Thomas R. Frey*	Democrat	
133rd	Andrew D. Virgilio	Democrat	
134th	Roger J. Robach	Democrat	
135th	Don W. Cook*	Republican	
136th	James L. Emery*	Republican	
137th	R. Stephen Hawley*	Republican	
138th	John B. Daly*	Republican	
139th	Matthew J. Murphy Jr.	Democrat	
140th	Harold H. Izard	Democrat	
141st	G. James Fremming	Democrat	
142nd	Stephen R. Greco*	Democrat	
143rd	Arthur O. Eve*	Democrat	
144th	William B. Hoyt	Democrat	
145th	Francis J. Griffin*	Democrat	
146th	Dennis T. Gorski	Democrat	
147th	Ronald H. Tills*	Republican	
148th	Vincent J. Graber, Sr.	Democrat	
149th	Daniel B. Walsh	Democrat	
150th	Rolland E. Kidder	Democrat	

=== Employees ===
- Clerk: Catherine A. Carey

== Sources ==
- Legislators' Lulu List: Who Gets $$ in the Civil Service Leader (Vol. XXXVI, No. 27, issue of September 30, 1975; pg. 10)
- Democrats Control State Assembly by Betsy Buchner, in The Evening News, of Newburgh, on November 6, 1974
