= Jerry Kremer =

American politician

Arthur "Jerry" Kremer

Member of the New York State Assembly
- In office 1966–1988
- Succeeded by: Harvey Weisenberg
- Constituency: 13th district (1966); 14th district (1967-1972); 20th district (1973-1988)

Chair of the Assembly Ways and Means Committee
- In office 1977–1986
- Preceded by: Burton Hecht
- Succeeded by: Saul Weprin

Personal details
- Born: May 27, 1935 (age 91) Bronx, New York
- Party: Democratic
- Spouse(s): Suzan Rosenholtz Kremer (m. 1987); Barbara Schatz (1961- 1986)(deceased)
- Children: Nora; Robin; Katherine; Lindsay
- Education: New York University; Brooklyn Law School (J.D.)
- Profession: Attorney and Chairman of Empire Government Strategies
- Website: Official website

Arthur J. "Jerry" Kremer (born May 27, 1935) is an attorney, author and political consultant. He served in the New York State Assembly for 13 terms from 1966 until 1988. He founded Empire Government Strategies, where he currently serves as Chairman. He is of-counsel to Ruskin Moscou Faltischek P.C., a Long Island law firm. He was recently voted to City and State NY's Power 100-Albany 2014.

== Early life ==
Kremer was born in Bronx, New York. He graduated from Franklin K. Lane High School in Queens, NY. He attended New York University and has a J.D. from Brooklyn Law School.

He is married to the former Suzan Rosenholtz with whom he has two daughters, Katherine and Lindsay. He was also married to Barbara Schatz, who died while Kremer was serving in the state legislature, and they had two daughters, Nora Lynn and Robin Malamud. He has six grandchildren, Benjamin, Samuel, Brett, Gabrielle, Jenna, and Zachary.

== Political career ==
Kremer was a member of the New York State Assembly, representing a district which includes the Five Towns, Long Beach, and other South Shore communities, from 1966 to 1988, sitting in the 176th, 177th, 178th, 179th, 180th, 181st, 182nd, 183rd, 184th, 185th, 186th and 187th New York State Legislatures.

He served as Chair of the Assembly Energy Committee and helped write the original power plant siting law. He then moved to the Ways and Means Committee which he chaired for 10 years. During his tenure he focused his efforts on increasing the budget making powers of the legislature.

Late in 1986, he was a candidate for Speaker of the New York State Assembly, but Mel Miller was chosen instead. At the beginning of the session of 1987, Miller appointed Saul Weprin to replace Kremer as chair of the Ways and Means Committee. In November 1988, Kremer was re-elected but, on December 14, he resigned his Assembly seat.

=== Legislation ===
Kremer helped draft the New York "Shield Law", which allowed journalists to refuse or reveal the sources of the information in news articles.

Kremer sponsored the "Lemon Law", designed to protect consumers who find that they have purchased a defective automobile.

Kremer lobbied for the reinstatement of the Article X Power Plant Siting Law. In 2012, the legislation was renewed and Kremer was an advisor.>

During his term in office, Kremer also spoke and wrote on the subjects of Truth in Lending for banks, assistance to senior Citizens including a law mandating that seniors be notified of their eligibility for a tax break by local governments and the first state pharmaceutical distribution program, a law requiring that LIRR employees be trained in CPR, a law forcing gas distributors to disclose their records on all shipments and pay the corresponding tax, and price minimum on cigarettes to counteract bootlegging.

== Post assembly ==
In 2010, Kremer founded Empire Government Strategies, a government relations firm. He has served as government relations representation to Canon U.S.A., DMJM+Harris Engineering, the New York State Bowling Proprietor's Association, the Bus Association of New York State, Public Service Electric and Gas, Caithness Energy, MedReview, the Fair Assessment Committee, the Town of North Hempstead, and the New York Association of Wholesale Marketers.

Kremer has spoken and written extensively about the energy industry and about energy policy in New York State and in the United States. He has testified on a number of occasions before the Nuclear Regulatory Commission. He is a supporter of the re-licensing of the Indian Point Energy nuclear power plant. He has served as counsel to the Long Island Power Authority(LIPA) and Power Authority of New York State and has represented them in a number of cases before the New York Court of Appeals.

Kremer is a member of the Board of Trustees of Hofstra University and Chair Emeritus of the Young Peoples Chorus of New York City. He also serves as Vice Chairman of the Commission on Independent Colleges and Universities. He is the Chairman of the New York Affordable Reliable Electricity Alliance He is a Lt. Colonel (ret.) in the New York State Guard. He is a member of the State Commission on Professionalism in the Law by the appointment of the Chief Judge.

== Publications ==
In 2013, Kremer published his first book, Winning Albany, Untold Stories About the Famous and Not So Famous, which recounts his experiences in state government. In addition to his 2013 book, he has written articles for the Huffington Post, Long Island Business News, The Herald News] and Politico. He has been the News12 political analyst for over fifteen years and appears regularly on the Fox network and ABC television.

New York State Assembly
Preceded by new district	New York State Assembly; 13th District; 1966	Succeeded by John S. Thorp, Jr.
Preceded by John S. Thorp, Jr.	New York State Assembly; 14th District; 1967–1972	Succeeded by Joseph M. Reilly
Preceded by John A. Esposito	New York State Assembly; 20th District; 1973–1988	Succeeded by Harvey Weisenberg
Preceded by Burton Hecht	New York State Assembly; Chairman of the Committee on Ways and Means; 1977–1986	Succeeded by Saul Weprin
