= Daniel B. Walsh =

American politician (1935–2018)

Daniel B. Walsh (August 2, 1935 - December 21, 2018) was an American politician from New York.

== Life ==
He was born on August 2, 1935, in Olean, Cattaraugus County, New York, the son of Pierce Walsh and Mary Cronin Walsh. He graduated B.A. from St. Bonaventure University. He married Nancy Cashimere, and they had two daughters.

He was a member of the New York State Assembly from 1973 to 1987, sitting in the 180th, 181st, 182nd, 183rd, 184th, 185th, 186th and 187th New York State Legislatures. He was Majority Leader from 1979 to 1987. He was a delegate to the 1984 Democratic National Convention. In January 1987, he was a candidate for Speaker of the New York State Assembly, but Mel Miller was chosen by the Democratic caucus. Walsh was re-appointed as Majority Leader by Miller, but on April 14, 1987, Walsh tendered his resignation from the Assembly, effective on April 26.

In May 1987, he began to work for the Business Council of New York State, and became President of the organization in 1988, succeeding Raymond T. Schuler. Walsh remained on the job until October 2006.

New York State Assembly
Preceded by Lloyd A. Russell	New York State Assembly; 149th District; 1973–1987	Succeeded by Patricia McGee
Political offices
Preceded by Stanley Fink	Majority Leader of the New York State Assembly; 1979–1987	Succeeded by James R. Tallon, Jr.
