= Seymour R. Thaler =

American politician (1919–1976)

Member of the New York State Senate
- In office January 1, 1959 – December 1971
- Preceded by: Irwin Pakula
- Succeeded by: Emanuel R. Gold
- Constituency: 7th district (1959-1965); 13th district (1966); 10th district (1967-1971)

Personal details
- Born: August 31, 1919 Bronx, New York, U.S.
- Died: February 5, 1976 (aged 56) Queens, New York, U.S.
- Party: Democratic
- Education: Brooklyn College; Brooklyn Law School

Seymour R. Thaler (August 31, 1919 – February 5, 1976) was an American lawyer and politician from New York. A Democrat, he served in the New York State Senate from 1958 to 1971. He won a seat on the New York Supreme Court in 1971, but never heard a case as a result of his 1972 conviction for dealing in stolen Treasury securities.

== Early life ==
He was born Seymour Thaler on August 31, 1919, in the East Bronx, New York City, the son of Jacob Thaler and Gussie Thaler. He added the middle initial R. to his name while still going to school. He attended Public School No. 63 and DeWitt Clinton High School. He graduated from Brooklyn College; and LL.B. and J.S.D. from Brooklyn Law School. He was admitted to the bar in 1942, and practiced law in New York City. He was Jewish.

== Political career ==
Thaler served in the New York State Senate from three different districts in the 172nd, 173rd, 174th, 175th, 176th, 177th, 178th, 179th and 180th New York State Legislatures.

Thaler first won election to the Senate in 1958, defeating incumbent Irwin Pakula in the 7th district from Queens. He served that district until 1966, shifting over to the 13th district to replace Guy James Mangano who stepped down to become a judge. Later in 1966, he ran for the 10th district Senate seat to replace Irving Mosberg, who ran for a judgeship on the New York City Civil Court.

In 1962, Thaler ran as an independent candidate in a special election to replace Lester Holtzman, who had resigned to take a judgeship on the New York Supreme Court. Thaler's nominating petitions to get on the ballot were invalidated by the courts. He was a delegate to the 1964 Democratic National Convention.

In 1969, he ran in the Democratic primary for New York City Comptroller on a ticket with former Mayor Robert F. Wagner Jr. who was seeking a return to City Hall after leaving office in 1965. Thaler was defeated in the Democratic primary election by Abraham Beame.

== Conviction ==
In November 1971, Thaler was elected to the New York Supreme Court. On December 21, he and three associates were indicted for selling $800,000 worth of stolen Treasury bills in 1970. On December 23, 1971, he pleaded not guilty. In February 1972, four counts of perjury were added to the indictment. On March 23, he was convicted of unlawfully receiving and disposing of stolen securities, and of perjury. On August 8, he was sentenced to one year in prison, and fined $10,000. On November 2, he was disbarred by the Appellate Division. On March 5, 1973, the conviction was upheld by the United States Court of Appeals for the Second Circuit.

He began serving his sentence of three consecutive terms of one year and a day in November 1973. While in prison, he filed a $52.5 million Federal lawsuit against the Second National Bank Of New Haven alleging that the bank's negligent failure to inform him that the securities were stolen cost him his office, law license and resulted in public scorn. The judge Jon O. Newman dismissed the case, comparing Thaler to a child who murdered his parents and sought pity as an orphan.

== Death ==
Thaler died on February 5, 1976, in Queens, of a heart attack and was buried at the New Montefiore Cemetery in Springfield Gardens, Queens. He was 56.

== Sources ==
New York State Senate
Preceded by Irwin Pakula	New York State Senate; 7th District; 1959–1965	Succeeded by John R. Dunne
Preceded by Guy James Mangano	New York State Senate; 13th District; 1966	Succeeded by Nicholas Ferraro
Preceded by Irving Mosberg	New York State Senate; 10th District; 1967–1971	Succeeded by Emanuel R. Gold
