= James R. Tallon =

American politician (1941–2024)

Acting Speaker of the New York State Assembly
- In office December 13, 1991 – December 15, 1991
- Governor: Mario Cuomo
- Lieutenant Governor: Stan Lundine
- Preceded by: Mel Miller
- Succeeded by: Saul Weprin

Member of the New York State Assembly from the 124th district
- In office January 1, 1975 – September 8, 1993
- Preceded by: Francis J. Boland Jr.
- Succeeded by: Robert J. Warner

Personal details
- Born: October 21, 1941 Brooklyn, New York, U.S.
- Died: July 9, 2024 (aged 82) Endicott, New York, U.S.
- Party: Democratic
- Education: Syracuse University; Boston University

James Raymond Tallon Jr. (October 21, 1941 – July 9, 2024) was an American politician and health-care expert.

== Education ==
Tallon received a B.A., cum laude, in political science from Syracuse University and an M.A. in international relations from Boston University. He has done additional graduate work at the Maxwell School of Citizenship and Public Affairs at Syracuse University. In 1995, he was awarded honorary doctorates of humane letters from the College of Medicine and School of Graduate Studies of the State University of New York Health Science Center at Brooklyn, and from New York Medical College.

== Career ==
Tallon entered politics as a Democrat. He was a member of the New York State Assembly from 1975 to 1993, sitting in the 181st, 182nd, 183rd, 184th, 185th, 186th, 187th, 188th, 189th and 190th New York State Legislatures. He was Majority Leader from 1987 to 1993, and was Acting Speaker for 3 days in 1991 after Mel Miller lost his seat upon a felony conviction until the election of Saul Weprin. He was Chairman of the Assembly's Health Committee from 1979 to 1987, and spearheaded efforts to reform the Medicaid program while expanding eligibility for pregnant women and children.

In 1993, he joined the Henry J. Kaiser Family Foundation, and served as Chairman of the Kaiser Commission on the Future of Medicaid and was a member of the Joint Commission on the Accreditation of Healthcare Organizations. He also served as Secretary for the Alpha Center and for the Association for Health Services Research, and was on the boards of the Alliance for Health Reform, The Commonwealth Fund, and the New York Academy of Medicine. He concluded a three-year term as a member of the Prospective Payment Assessment Commission (ProPAC), and has held visiting lecturer appointments at the Columbia University and Harvard University Schools of Public Health.

He was Chairman of the Kaiser Commission on Medicaid and the Uninsured. Tallon was President of the United Hospital Fund of New York, the nation's oldest federated charity. The Fund addresses critical issues affecting hospitals and health care in New York City through health services research and policy analysis, education and information activities, and grantmaking and volunteerism.

In 2007, Tallon was elected Chairman of the Commonwealth Fund after serving as director for over a decade.

Tallon died from idiopathic pulmonary fibrosis in Endicott, New York on July 9, 2024, at the age of 82.

== Sources ==
- Bio at the Kaiser Family Foundation
- Bio at United Hospital Fund
- Bio at The Commonwealth Fund

New York State Assembly
Preceded by Francis J. Boland Jr.	New York State Assembly; 124th District; 1975–1993	Succeeded by Robert J. Warner
Political offices
Preceded by Daniel B. Walsh	Majority Leader of the New York State Assembly; 1987–1993	Succeeded by Michael J. Bragman
Preceded by Mel Miller	Speaker of the New York State Assembly; Acting; 1991	Succeeded by Saul Weprin
