= John Flack =

John Flack may refer to:

- John Flack (bishop), English Anglican bishop
- John Flack (British politician), former member of the European Parliament
- John T. Flack, former member of the New York State Assembly
