= Elizabeth Connelly =

American politician

Member of the New York State Assembly
- In office November 1973 – December 31, 2000
- Preceded by: Edward J. Amann Jr.
- Succeeded by: John W. Lavelle
- Constituency: 61st district (1974-1982); 58th district (1983-1992); 59th district (1993-2000)

Personal details
- Born: June 19, 1928 Brooklyn, New York, U.S.
- Died: May 25, 2006 (aged 77) Staten Island, New York, U.S.
- Party: Democratic

Elizabeth Ann "Betty" Connelly (June 19, 1928 – May 25, 2006) was a politician from Staten Island, New York who represented the North Shore community from 1973 to 2000. She was the first woman to win elective office to any district encompassing Staten Island.

== Life ==
She was born Elizabeth Ann Keresey on June 19, 1928, in Brooklyn, New York City to John Walter and Alice Marie (Mallon) Keresey. She grew up in Brooklyn and the Bronx. After finishing high school Connelly began work at Pan American World Airways in 1946, where she met future husband Robert V. Connelly in 1948. They were married on September 6, 1952 and later moved to Staten Island, New York to raise a family. Elizabeth and Robert had four children together: Alice, Robert Jr., Margaret and Therese.

Connelly died on May 25, 2006, at her home in Westerleigh, Staten Island.

== Political career ==
She entered politics as a Democrat in 1966, joining the North Shore Democratic Club and elected to the Democratic County Committee, serving as a zone leader from 1972 to 1974. Connelly was elected in November 1973 to the New York State Assembly, to fill the vacancy caused by the appointment of Edward J. Amann Jr. to the New York Court of Claims. Connelly was re-elected several times and remained in the Assembly until 2000, sitting in the 180th, 181st, 182nd, 183rd, 184th, 185th, 186th, 187th, 188th, 189th, 190th, 191st, 192nd and 193rd New York State Legislatures.

In 1975, Connelly was assigned to the Committee on Mental Health, Mental Retardation, Developmental Disabilities, Alcoholism and Substance Abuse. When she was named chair in 1977 she became the first woman Democrat to chair an Assembly standing committee. She remained chair from 1977-1992. Other committees on which she served include: Education (1974-1976), Transportation (1974-1993), Environmental Conservation (1979-1986), Health (1974-2000), Rules (1981-2000), Veterans (1985-2000), Corrections (1987-2000), House Operations (1980-c 1990) and Ways and Means (1993-2000).

In 1993, the Legislature elected Connelly to chair the New York State Legislative Women's Caucus and Speaker Saul Weprin appointed her to chair the Committee on Committees. Speaker Sheldon Silver appointed her to be Speaker Pro Tempore in 1995, the highest-ranking leadership position ever held by a woman in the history of the New York State Assembly. When Connelly retired in 2000, she was the longest serving woman in the history of the New York State Legislature.

== Disability Advocacy ==
Throughout her political career, Connelly advocated for funding and policies that benefited disabled New Yorkers. She was instrumental in securing funds for mental health programs and in creating the Commission on Quality of Care for the Mentally Disabled.

More specifically, she worked to extend the MTA's Half Fare program to include the mentally ill, to create a wheelchair "lemon law" and to limit extensive travel time for disabled students. She was also instrumental in passing laws requiring insurance coverage for formulas needed by persons with metabolic disorders such as Phenylketonuria. Connelly was the prime sponsor of legislation creating the pilot program at Bellevue Hospital. She also advocated for closure of the Willowbrook State School, after she made an unannounced tour of the school in January, 1974.

== Legacy ==
Staten Island University Hospital opened the Elizabeth A. Connelly Emergency and Trauma Center in 2009. Connelly had been a volunteer at the hospital prior to her election in 1973. A community center, named for her was also opened around the same time. The NYS Institute for Basic Research in Developmental Disabilities holds the Elizabeth A. Connelly Memorial Conference on Autism & Related Conditions annually.

A collection of Connelly's correspondence, newsletters, reports, press releases, news clippings, public hearing testimony, photographs and awards is available at the Archives and Special Collections of The College of Staten Island.

New York State Assembly
Preceded by Edward J. Amann Jr.	Member of the New York State Assembly from the 61st district 1974–1982	Succeeded by William F. Passannante
Preceded by Joseph R. Lentol	Member of the New York State Assembly from the 58th district 1983–1992	Succeeded by N. Nick Perry
Preceded by Eric Nicholas Vitaliano	Member of the New York State Assembly from the 59th district 1993–2000	Succeeded by John W. Lavelle
