= John J. Santucci =

American politician (1931–2016)

District Attorney of Queens County
- In office January 1, 1977 – June 1, 1991; Interim: January 1, 1977 – December 31, 1977
- Preceded by: Nicholas Ferraro
- Succeeded by: Richard A. Brown

Member of the New York State Senate
- In office February 20, 1968 – December 31, 1976
- Preceded by: Irving Mosberg
- Succeeded by: Sheldon Farber
- Constituency: 11th district (1968–1972); 10th district (1972–1976)

Member of the New York City Council from the 6th district
- In office 1964–1965
- Preceded by: Eric J. Treulich
- Succeeded by: David B. Friedland

Personal details
- Born: April 2, 1931 Queens, New York City, U.S.
- Died: June 26, 2016 (aged 85) Mineola, New York. U.S.
- Party: Democratic
- Education: St. John's University

John Joseph Santucci (April 2, 1931 – June 26, 2016) was an American lawyer and politician.

== Life ==
The son of Italian immigrant parents, Santucci was born on April 2, 1931, in Ozone Park, Queens, New York City. He attended Public Schools No. 123 and 155, and John Adams High School. He graduated from St. John's University, and in 1953 from St. John's University School of Law. He practiced law in New York City, and entered politics as a Democrat.

On April 14, 1964, Santucci was co-opted to the New York City Council (6th D.), to fill the vacancy caused by the appointment of Eric J. Treulich to the New York City Civil Court.

On February 20, 1968, Santucci was elected to the New York State Senate, to fill the vacancy caused by the election of Irving Mosberg to the New York City Civil Court. He remained in the Senate until 1976, sitting in the 177th, 178th, 179th, 180th, and 181st New York State Legislatures. He was re-elected in November 1976, but resigned his seat before the next Legislature met.

On December 30, 1976, Santucci was appointed as District Attorney of Queens County, to fill the vacancy caused by the election of Nicholas Ferraro to the New York Supreme Court. In November 1977, Santucci was elected to succeed himself, defeating anti-corruption crusader Maurice H. Nadjari. In 1980, Santucci ran in the Democratic primary for the U.S. Senate seat held by Jacob K. Javits but was defeated by U.S. Representative Elizabeth Holtzman. Santucci was re-elected as D.A. in 1981, 1985, and 1989. He tendered his resignation on May 1, 1991, to take effect on June 1. He died aged 85 at Winthrop-University Hospital on June 26, 2016, after going into cardiac arrest at his home in Garden City, New York.

New York State Senate
| Preceded by Irving Mosberg | Member of the New York State Senate from the 11th district 1968–1972 | Succeeded by Frank Padavan |
| Preceded by Emanuel R. Gold | Member of the New York State Senate from the 10th district 1973–1976 | Succeeded by Sheldon Farber |
Legal offices
| Preceded by Nicholas Ferraro | District Attorney of Queens County; 1977–1991 | Succeeded by Richard A. Brown |
