= Nicholas Ferraro =

American politician

District Attorney of Queens County
- In office January 1, 1974 – December 31, 1976
- Preceded by: Michael F. Armstrong
- Succeeded by: John J. Santucci

Member of the New York State Senate
- In office January 1966 – November 1973
- Preceded by: Jeremiah B. Bloom
- Succeeded by: John J. Moore
- Constituency: 12th district (1966); 13th district (1967-1972); 14th district (1973)

Personal details
- Born: May 30, 1928 Queens, New York, U.S.
- Died: December 21, 1984 (aged 56) Queens, New York, U.S.
- Party: Democratic

Nicholas Ferraro (May 30, 1928 – December 21, 1984) was an American lawyer and politician from New York.

== Life ==
He was born on May 30, 1928, in Astoria, Queens, New York City. He attended Public School No. 85, Junior High School No. 141, and William Cullen Bryant High School. His mother’s name was Antionette and father’s name was Domenic. He had one brother, Carl. He graduated from Seton Hall College, and in 1953 from Brooklyn Law School. He practiced law in New York City, and entered politics as a Democrat. He married Virginia Kachadrian, and they had three children. They lived in Jackson Heights, Queens. In 1957, he was appointed as an assistant district attorney of Queens County.

He was a member of the New York State Senate from 1966 to 1973, sitting in the 176th, 177th, 178th, 179th and 180th New York State Legislatures. In November 1973, he was elected D.A. of Queens County.

He was D.A. of Queens County from 1974 to 1976. Upon taking office, he appointed his cousin Geraldine Ferraro (1935–2011) as an Assistant D.A. In November 1976, he was elected to the New York Supreme Court.

He was a Justice of the Supreme Court from 1977 to April 1984 when he resigned from the bench, and resumed his private practice.

He died on December 21, 1984, in the City Hospital Center in Elmhurst, Queens, after a heart attack.

== Sources ==
New York State Senate
Preceded by Jeremiah B. Bloom	New York State Senate; 12th District; 1966	Succeeded by William C. Brennan
Preceded by Seymour R. Thaler	New York State Senate; 13th District; 1967–1972	Succeeded by Emanuel R. Gold
Preceded by Edward S. Lentol	New York State Senate; 14th District; 1973	Succeeded by John J. Moore
Legal offices
Preceded by Michael F. Armstrong	District Attorney of Queens County; 1974–1976	Succeeded by John J. Santucci
