= John J. Moore =

American politician

Member of the New York State Senate from the 14th district
- In office February 14, 1974 – January 18, 1976
- Preceded by: Nicholas Ferraro
- Succeeded by: Anthony Gazzara

Personal details
- Born: c. 1920
- Died: January 18, 1976 (aged 55–56) Queens, New York
- Party: Democratic

John J. Moore (c. 1920 – January 18, 1976) was an American politician from New York.

== Life ==
He entered politics as a Democrat. On February 14, 1974, he was elected to the New York State Senate, to fill the vacancy caused by the election of Nicholas Ferraro as D.A. of Queens County. Moore was re-elected in November 1974, and remained in the Senate until his death in 1976, sitting in the 180th and 181st New York State Legislatures.

He died on January 18, 1976, at his home in Jackson Heights, Queens, of a heart attack.

New York State Senate
Preceded by Nicholas Ferraro	New York State Senate; 14th District; 1974–1976	Succeeded by Anthony V. Gazzara
