= Victor L. Robles =

American politician (born 1945)

Victor Robles

Member of the New York City Council
- In office 1992–2001
- Preceded by: Joseph F. Lisa
- Succeeded by: Diana Reyna
- Constituency: 34th district
- In office 1985–1991
- Preceded by: Luis Olmedo
- Succeeded by: Archie Spigner
- Constituency: 27th district

Member of the New York State Assembly
- In office January 1, 1979 – December 31, 1984
- Preceded by: Peter G. Mirto
- Succeeded by: Vito J. Lopez
- Constituency: 59th district (1979–1982); 53rd district (1983–1984)

Personal details
- Born: Victor L. Robles; June 15, 1945 (age 81) Fajardo, Puerto Rico
- Spouse: Daisy Parrilla
- Occupation: Politician

Military service
- Allegiance: United States of America
- Branch/service: United States Army
- Years of service: 1966-1968

Victor L. Robles (born June 15, 1945) is an American politician from New York.

== Biography ==
Robles was born on June 15, 1945, in Fajardo, Puerto Rico. He grew up in Williamsburg, Brooklyn, where he was raised by the Puerto Rican-American community activist Aurea M. Blanco. At a young age, he was asked by his mother to translate for her at neighborhood meetings and protests; through these activities, he caught the attention of former assemblyman and State Supreme Court Justice Gilbert Ramirez, who introduced him to Shirley Chisholm. He went on to work on Chisholm's staff, and entered politics as a Democrat.

Robles was a member of the New York State Assembly from 1979 to 1984, sitting in the 183rd, 184th and 185th New York State Legislatures. He was a member of the New York City Council from 1985 to 2001. In October 2001, he was elected by the City Council as City Clerk of New York. He remained in office until July 2007.

New York State Assembly
Preceded by Peter G. Mirto	New York State Assembly; 59th district 1979–1982	Succeeded by Eric N. Vitaliano
Preceded by Woodrow Lewis	New York State Assembly; 53rd district 1983–1984	Succeeded by Vito Lopez
New York City Council
Preceded by Luis Olmedo	New York City Council; 27th district 1985–1991	Succeeded by Archie Spigner
Preceded by Joseph Lisa	New York City Council; 34th district 1992–2001	Succeeded by Diana Reyna
