= William C. Knights =

American politician

William C. Knights (January 24, 1917 – February 5, 1973) was an American politician from New York.

== Life ==
He was born on January 24, 1917, in Knowlesville, Orleans County, New York. He attended Knowlesville Union School and Medina High School. Afterwards he engaged in farming and the real estate business. He was also an auctioneer, and entered politics as a Republican.

Knights was a member of the New York State Assembly (137th D.) in 1973. A few weeks into his term, he suffered injuries in a car accident, and died on February 5, 1973, in Arnold Gregory Memorial Hospital in Albion, New York.

New York State Assembly
Preceded by V. Sumner Carroll	New York State Assembly; 137th District; 1973	Succeeded by R. Stephen Hawley
