= William N. Reidy =

American politician

Member of the New York State Assembly from Richmond's 1st district
- In office January 1, 1949 – May 30, 1952
- Preceded by: Arthur T. Berge
- Succeeded by: Edward J. Amann Jr.

Personal details
- Born: January 9, 1912 Staten Island, New York City, New York
- Died: May 30, 1952 (aged 40) Staten Island, New York City, New York
- Party: Democratic

William N. Reidy (January 9, 1912 – May 30, 1952) was an American politician who served in the New York State Assembly from 1949 to 1952. He was married to Dorothy Smith of Staten Island on April 16, 1939.
