= S. William Rosenberg =

American politician

Member of the New York State Assembly from the 132nd district
- In office January 1, 1967 – December 31, 1972
- Preceded by: Edward F. Crawford
- Succeeded by: Thomas R. Frey

Member of the New York State Assembly from the 145th district
- In office January 1, 1966 – December 31, 1966
- Preceded by: District created
- Succeeded by: John B. Lis

Member of the New York State Assembly from Monroe's 2nd district
- In office January 1, 1961 – December 31, 1965
- Preceded by: John J. Conway Jr.
- Succeeded by: District abolished

Personal details
- Born: March 10, 1916 Rochester, New York
- Died: January 22, 1990 (aged 73)
- Party: Republican

S. William Rosenberg (March 10, 1916 – January 22, 1990) was an American politician who served in the New York State Assembly from 1961 to 1972.
