= Harold C. Luther =

American politician

Harold Clayton Luther (October 5, 1915 – May 15, 1973) was an American politician from New York.

== Life ==
He was born on October 5, 1915, in Salisbury Center, Herkimer County, New York, the son of Clayton Luther (1882–1950) and Clara (Johnson) Luther (1885–1976). He attended Mohawk Valley Community College and the University of Richmond. Then he engaged in the insurance business in Dolgeville. On September 4, 1948, he married Muriel J. Jones (1922–2010), and they had two children.

Luther entered politics as a Republican, and was Supervisor of the Town of Manheim.

He was a member of the New York State Assembly (113th D.) in 1973. He died near the end of the regular legislative session, on May 15, 1973, in Albany Medical Center in Albany, New York, after a heart attack; and was buried at the Salisbury Rural Cemetery.

New York State Assembly
Preceded by Edwyn E. Mason	New York State Assembly; 113th District; 1973	Succeeded by Peter S. Dokuchitz
