= Burton Hecht =

American lawyer and politician

Burton Glaser Hecht (born December 30, 1927) is an American lawyer and politician from New York.

== Life ==
Hecht was born on December 30, 1927, in New York City to Charlotte Glaser and Robert Hecht. He attended Public School No. 86 and DeWitt Clinton High School. He graduated from New York University and New York University School of Law. He married Isabel M. (1930–2000), and they had three children.

He entered politics as a Democrat.

He was a member of the New York State Assembly from 1963 to 1976, sitting in the 174th, 175th, 176th, 177th, 178th, 179th, 180th and 181st New York State Legislatures. He was Chairman of the Committee on Claims in 1967 and 1968; and Chairman of the Committee on Ways and Means in 1975 and 1976. In November 1976, he was elected to the New York City Civil Court.

In December 1985, Hecht was injured in a car accident on the New York State Thruway while returning from Albany to New York City. The driver of the car, Acting Supreme Court Justice Archie A. Gorfinkel, died from his injuries. Hecht was brought to the Good Samaritan Hospital in Suffern, and recovered.

In November 1988, Hecht was elected to the New York Supreme Court (12th D.).

After retiring from the bench, he moved to Delray Beach, Florida. He is Jewish.

New York State Assembly
| Preceded by William Kapelman | New York State Assembly; Bronx County, 9th District; 1963–1965 | Succeeded by district abolished |
| Preceded by new district | New York State Assembly; 91st District; 1966 | Succeeded by Joseph R. Pisani |
| Preceded by Robert García | New York State Assembly; 83rd District; 1967–1976 | Succeeded by George Friedman |
| Preceded by Willis H. Stephens | New York State Assembly; Chairman of the Committee on Ways and Means; 1975–1976 | Succeeded by Arthur J. Kremer |
