= Eugene Levy (politician) =

American politician (1926–1990)

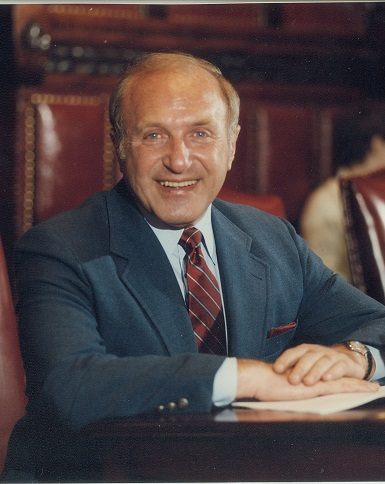

Member of the New York State Senate from the 38th district
- In office January 1985 – July 12, 1990
- Preceded by: Linda Winikow
- Succeeded by: Joseph Holland

Member of the New York State Assembly from the 93rd District
- In office January 1983 – December 1984

Member of the New York State Assembly from the 95th District
- In office January 1973 – December 1982

Member of the New York State Assembly from the 94th District
- In office January 1969 – December 1972

Personal details
- Born: December 1, 1926 New York City, New York, US
- Died: July 12, 1990 (aged 63) Valhalla, New York, US
- Party: Republican
- Spouse: Geraldine Schack (m. 1950)
- Children: William Levy; Felicia Levy

Eugene Levy (December 1, 1926 – July 12, 1990) was a member of the New York State Senate for the 38th District covering all of Rockland County and parts of Orange County, New York. He was elected to the New York State Senate in 1984, where he remained for three terms.

During his undefeated political career, Levy was elected into office 13 times. Before he was elected to the New York State Senate, Levy was twice elected as councilman of the town of Ramapo, New York. He held this position from 1964 to 1968. He then served in the New York State Assembly from 1969 until 1984.

Levy died of leukemia in July 1990. At the time of his death, he had been elected to the New York State Senate three times, and he was getting ready to run for a fourth Senate term.

== Early life ==
Levy was born in Brooklyn, New York, on December 1, 1926. He graduated from Spring Valley High School in 1944. During his high school career, Levy played basketball and football, and ran track. After high school, Levy served for two years in the Navy Medical Corps; he returned to New York in 1946 after receiving an honorable discharge.

Levy attended NYU and Queens College, but left to help with the family business, the Plaza Restaurant in Spring Valley, New York.

Levy married Geraldine (Schack) Levy in 1950. They had two children, William Levy and Felicia Alice Levy. The family home is located in Montebello (formerly Suffern), New York.

== Political career ==
In 1963, Levy was working in the family owned restaurant when he was approached to run for the position of Councilman of the town of Ramapo, New York. He ran against incumbent Democratic Councilman James Izzo, and won by more than 1,500 votes. After his first term as Councilman, Levy successfully ran for re-election in 1967. Levy held the position until he was elected to the New York State Assembly in 1968 defeating incumbent Democrat Joseph St. Lawrence.

Levy was a politically moderate Republican who described himself as "pro-choice and pro-death penalty". Throughout his career, Levy was involved in issues related to consumer protection, education, mental health, and the environment.

=== New York State Assembly ===
Levy, a Republican in a heavily Democratic county, ran successfully for State Assembly in 1968. Levy was a member of the New York State Assembly from 1969 to 1984, sitting in the 178th, 179th, 180th, 181st, 182nd, 183rd, 184th and 185th New York State Legislatures. During his time as Assemblyman, he became the Republican minority assistant whip. In August 1973, Governor Nelson Rockefeller appointed Levy to the Temporary State Commission on Living Costs and the Economy.

Levy served on several committees during his time in the New York State Assembly:

- Chairman of Select Committee on Consumer protection
- Chairman of Assembly Minority Program Committee
- Ranking Minority Member of Assembly Education Committee
- Assistant Minority Whip on Rules and Assembly Education Standing Committees
- Ranking Minority Member of Special Committee on Nuclear Safety
- Ranking Minority Member on the Housing Committee
- Member of Special Task Force on Correctional Services
- Member of Legislative Task Force on the Disabled

During his time in the New York State Assembly, Levy helped pass legislation requiring that all New York counties employ full-time district attorneys. This legislation also established a minimum salary for district attorneys in counties with a population over 100,000 and lengthened the term of office for district attorneys in all counties.

In 1970, Levy helped secure funding for the construction of interchange 14B on the New York State Thruway on Airmont Road in Ramapo.

In 1971, Levy helped defeat a bill that would have allowed the Department of Health to close Haverstraw Rehabilitation Hospital. The hospital was later renamed Helen Hayes Hospital, in honor of actress and philanthropist Helen Hayes MacArthur, the "First Lady of American Theater".

=== New York State Senate ===
Levy was elected to the New York State Senate in 1984. He was a member of the New York State Senate from 1985 until his death in 1990, sitting in the 186th, 187th and 188th New York State Legislatures. He successfully sponsored and cosponsored more than 280 pieces of legislation, including several bills that protected consumers, children, and the elderly. Levy sponsored legislation that raised the minimum age for correctional officers in New York from 18 to 21. He also sponsored legislation to protect consumers from "embarrassing" and "threatening" debt collection practices.

Levy sponsored several bills related to mental health, including bills to establish new state hospitals for the mentally ill; to develop comprehensive requirements for staffing inpatient wards at adult psychiatric centers; bills to protect patient confidentiality and patients' rights; housing programs for homeless; AIDS care; education for handicapped children.

The committees that Levy served on during his time in the New York State Senate included consumer protection; banks; commerce; economic development and small business; education; environmental conservation; mental hygiene; tourism; recreation and sports; and transportation. He was also a member of a Special Task Force on Drunk Driving.

In 1988, Levy and 17 other GOP senators from New York officially endorsed George H. W. Bush for the GOP presidential nomination.

== Community Involvement ==
Levy was especially involved in consumer protection, education, people with disabilities, and environmental issues. He was also active in issues related to veterans' affairs.

In 1969, Levy helped found Camp Venture, Rockland County's first day camp for mentally handicapped children. Levy helped the camp obtain matching funds from the State Department of Mental Hygiene.

In 1983, after the death of his 24-year-old daughter Felicia in an automobile accident, Levy contributed funds donated in her memory to help with the construction of a new dialysis center at Good Samaritan Hospital in Suffern, New York. The waiting room at the facility is named for Felicia. A portrait of Felicia hangs in the waiting room.

Levy helped raise funds to establish the JCC Rockland, which opened in 1988.

Levy held a variety of positions and memberships in community organizations throughout his political career:

- Master of the Athelstane Lodge No. 839
- President, Master and Wardens Association of Rockland County
- Member, Knights of Pythias
- Vice-Commander, American Legion, Moscarella Post
- Member, Spring Valley Rotary
- Member, Advisory Board of the Rockland State Hospital Guild
- Member, Rockland County Boy Scout Council
- Board member, Mid-Hudson Valley Chapter National Multiple Sclerosis Society
- Advisory member, Rockland County Committee for Hearing Impaired
- Board member, Rockland County Mental Health Association
- Board member, Haitian Community Council of Rockland
- Associate director, Rockland Advisory Board of Help Me, Inc.
- Member, Fred Hecht Jewish War Veterans
- Associate director, Rockland County Center for the Physically Handicapped
- Member, Advisory Board of Directors Rockland County Association for Children with Learning Disabilities
- Member, Executive Board Ramapo P.A.L. Center
- Member, Advisory Board, CANDLE
- Honorary member, Board of Directors of the Rockland County Association for Retarded Children (ARC)
- Member, Advisory Committee of the Rockland County Association for the Visually Impaired

During his political career, Levy received the following awards and recognition related to the causes he supported:

- Distinguished Service Award, Spring Valley Jaycees
- Friend of the Handicapped Award, Rockland County Exceptional Child PTA
- Man of the Year Award, Jewish War Veterans
- Annual Public Service Award, Jewish War Veterans
- Humanitarian Award, New City Lions Club
- Friend of Education Award, Rockland County Teachers Association
- Friend of Education Award, Ramapo School District No. 2 Principals Association
- Appreciation Award, Welfare League of Letchworth Village
- Outstanding Service Award in the Field of Educational Professionalism, School Administrators Association of New York State
- Humanitarian Efforts Award, Cooley's Anemia Committee of the Order of Sons of Italy in America
- Outstanding Leadership Award, Rockland County Shields Association
- Special Tribute Award and Lifetime Membership, NAACP
- B'nai B'rith Youth Services Award, Rockland Educators Group
- Hans Schoenberger Humanitarian Award, High Tor Lodge of B'nai B'rith
- Youth Donor Award, Temple Beth El Men's Club
- Man of the Year Award, Monsey Rotary and Temple Shaarey Tfiloh
- Life Membership Award, New York State Congress of Parents and Teachers from the Central Hudson District PTA
- Annual Award, Reform Temple of Suffern
- Distinguished Citizen Award, Rockland Council, Boy Scouts of America
- Man of the Year Award, Citizens for a Clean Government
- Life Membership Award, New York State Association for Retarded Children, Rockland County Chapter
- Anatoly Scharansky Humanitarian Award, Rockland County Committee for Soviet Jewry
- Community Service Award, Yeshiva University
- Justice Louis D. Brandeis Award, Zionist Organization of America
- Honorary Doctor of Laws, St. Thomas Aquinas College
- Award from the Rockland County Society for the Prevention of Cruelty to Children
- Man of the Year, Rockland Society for the Prevention of Cruelty to Animals
- Distinguished Public Service Award, Hudson Valley Political Action Committee
- Annual Recognition Award, The Council for Young Children
- Award from Rockland County Police Athletic League
- Outstanding Legislator Award, New York State Association of Counties
- "Friend of Tuxedo" award, Town of Tuxedo
- Good Scout Award, Kakiat District, Hudson Valley Council, Boy Scouts of America
- Key to the Vacation Camp for the Blind
- Humanitarian of the Year, Association for Retarded Children (ARC)
- Special Award from the Rockland County A.O.H and the Rockland R.S.V.P.
- Distinguished Service Award, Dads Against Drunk Drivers

At the time of his death, Levy had been nominated by the West Hudson District Branch of the American Psychological Association for the APA's Jacob Javits Public Service Award for his involvement in mental health issues.

== Death ==
Levy died of leukemia in the Westchester County Medical Center in Valhalla, NY, on July 12, 1990. At the time of his death, Levy was getting ready to run for a fourth state senate term.

More than 2,000 mourners came to Levy's funeral service at Temple Beth-El in Spring Valley, New York. During the service, a group of Clarkstown police officers gave a final salute, and a color guard of Jewish war veterans placed an American flag on Levy's casket. Members of the Ancient Order of Hibernians Rockland Pipe and Drum Corps played bagpipes as they escorted the senator's motorcade from the temple.

The Levy family received a condolence letter from then-President George H. W. Bush.

Mario Cuomo, the Governor of New York, called Levy a "great public servant" and noted Levy's "efforts on behalf of those challenged with disabilities."

On July 13, 1990, flags on all Rockland municipal buildings were flown at half-staff in memory of Levy. On the same day, US Representative Benjamin Gilman (R-NY) spoke to the House of Representatives in Washington, DC, about Levy's death, calling Levy a "humanitarian" and an "outstanding public servant".

On March 6, 1991, the New York State Assembly adopted Legislative Resolution 409, "Commemorating the Life and Achievements of the Honorable Eugene Levy".

Levy was also honored by the New York State Senate. On March 12, 1991, the New York State Senate adopted Legislative Resolution 523 in Levy's honor.

== Legacy ==
Landmarks

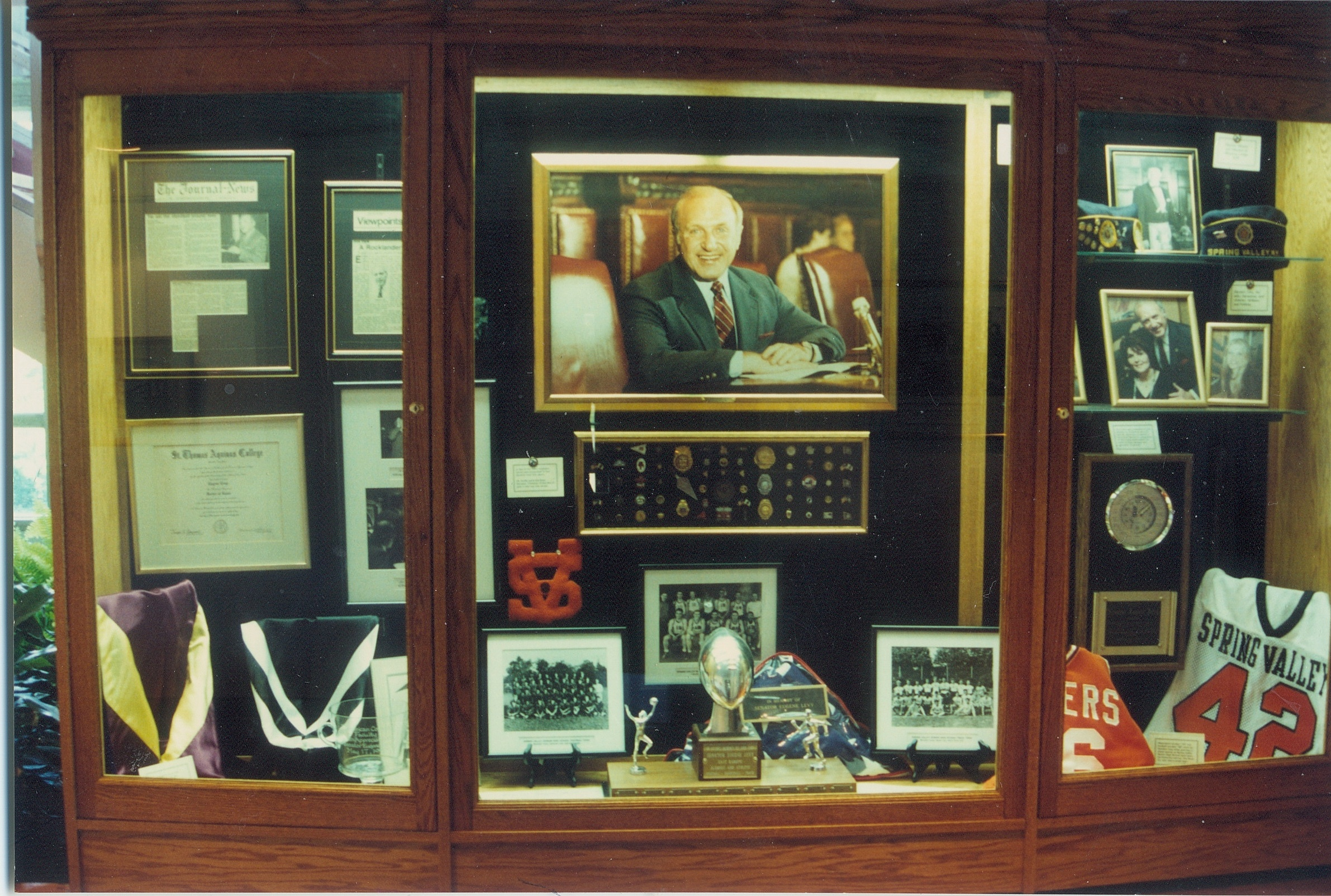
Museum case inside the Senator Eugene Levy Education Center in Ramapo, New York

Several landmarks and buildings throughout Rockland County are named in honor of Levy, including:

- Senator Eugene Levy Memorial Park in Ramapo, New York. The park was dedicated on September 3, 1995. The dedication included two color guard salutes and a flag-raising ceremony. The park also contains a plaque that Levy's son Bill inscribed to memorialize his father.
- Senator Levy Drive in Montebello, New York.
- Senator Gene Levy Municipal Plaza in Spring Valley, New York.
- Senator Eugene Levy Education Center, East Ramapo Central School District Board of Education, Ramapo, New York. A museum case inside the building holds a display of several photos, trophies, and other mementos of Levy's life and accomplishments. The museum case also houses the Levy Trophy, which is awarded to the winner of the Eugene Levy Memorial Game, an annual football game between the Ramapo and Spring Valley high school varsity football teams. The school district also retired Levy's high school basketball and football jersey numbers, which were 16 and 42, respectively.
- Eugene Levy Fieldhouse, Rockland Community College (SUNY Rockland), Suffern, New York.
- A meditation bench at the New City County Courthouse War Veterans' Memorial. An inscription on the bench reads, "Let this memorial stand as a tribute to the compassionate leadership of Senator Eugene Levy." The bench was dedicated in 1990, on Veteran's Day.
- A plaque at George Washington's Headquarters, The Dewint House in Tappan, New York. The plaque, which rests under a flowering Kwanzan cherry tree, reads, "Dedicated Oct. 11, 1992 by Athelstane Lodge #839 F & AM. In memory of Worshipful Eugene Levy. Past Master; New York State Senator."
- The Senator Eugene Levy Memorial Center, Camp Venture, Stony Point, New York. Levy's daughter Felicia, who died in 1981 at age 24, is also commemorated at Camp Venture. Camp Venture's Felicia Levy Campus and a workshop on the property are also named after her.
- The Sen. Eugene Levy Respite Apartment, Rockland Association for Retarded Children (ARC), Suffern, New York
- The Jawonio Sen. Eugene Levy Home, an independent living facility for mentally challenged adults in Montebello, New York.
- A plaque and memorial tree at the Nanuet Public Library in Nanuet, New York. The plaque, which was dedicated on October 14, 1990, reads, "In memory of Senator Eugene Levy." In 1969, Levy conducted the ribbon-cutting ceremony for the dedication of the library.
- The Village of Chestnut Ridge, New York named its meeting room after Levy.

Scholarships

After Levy's death, several scholarships were established in his name, including:

- The Senator Eugene Levy Scholarship, which is rotated among senior high schools in Rockland County, New York
- The Senator Eugene Levy Memorial Award at Suffern High School
- The Eugene Levy Memorial Scholarship at Dominican University (New York)
- The JCC Scholarship Fund
- The Alumni of Spring Valley Senior High School offers two college athletic scholarships to graduating seniors in Levy's honor.
- The Eugene Levy Scholarship (named for Levy during his lifetime) is awarded to students at Pearl River High School in Pearl River, New York, by Citizens for Clean Government.

Posthumous Honors

On July 30, 1990, the senator's home village of Montebello, New York, named December 1, Levy's birthday, as "Gene Levy Day".

Rockland Independent Living Center, Inc. gives an annual award called The Senator Eugene Levy Independent Living Award. The award is given each year to "an individual who advocates on behalf of persons with disabilities and promotes the philosophy of independent living".

The library at Church of the Presentation in Upper Saddle River, New Jersey, created a living memorial for Levy with funds donated in his memory. The funds were used to purchase a volume of children's Bible stories.

The New York Library Association passed a resolution honoring Levy's contributions at its October 1990 conference.

On February 7, 1991, Meals on Wheels of Rockland County dedicated the Eugene Levy Memorial Room at its facility in Nanuet, New York.

Levy was posthumously awarded an honorary Doctor of Laws degree from Dominican University New York on May 19, 1991.

In 1991, a benefit was held for Levy by the Helen Hayes Tappan Zee Playhouse in Nyack, New York. During the benefit, Levy's widow, Geraldine Levy, was presented with a seat plaque that was to be installed in the theater.

In 1992, the PFC Frederick Hecht Post No. 425 of the Jewish War Veterans established the Eugene Levy Humanitarian Award.

The Rockland Symphony Orchestra performed a concert in memory of Levy on March 29, 1992. New York composer Arthur Cunningham wrote a piece titled "Suncatcher" for the occasion.

In 1994, The Senator Eugene Levy Memorial Fund of the Leukemia Society of America was established and cosponsored by Rockland radio station WRKL and the Clarkstown South High School Future Business Leaders of America. To launch the fund, the two groups held a fundraiser called "Pennies for Patients." The goal of the fundraiser was to collect one million pennies during the month of April 1994.

On April 18, 2004, Levy was posthumously inducted into the Association for Retarded Children (ARC) of Rockland's 50th Anniversary Hall of Fame, for his support and involvement in causes related to people with disabilities. Certificates of Merit from the New York Senate, New York State Assembly and the Town of Ramapo, Rockland County accompanied this honor.

New York State Assembly
Preceded by Joseph T. St. Lawrence	New York State Assembly; 94th District; 1969–1972	Succeeded by Willis H. Stephens
Preceded by Benjamin Gilman	New York State Assembly; 95th District; 1973–1982	Succeeded by Bill Larkin
Preceded by Jon S. Fossel	New York State Assembly; 93rd District; 1983–1984	Succeeded by Samuel Colman
New York State Senate
Preceded by Linda Winikow	New York State Senate; 38th District; 1985–1990	Succeeded by Joseph R. Holland
