= Linda Winikow =

American politician from New York

Member of the New York State Senate from the 38th district
- In office 1975–1985
- Preceded by: Donald R. Ackerson
- Succeeded by: Eugene Levy

Personal details
- Born: Linda Bord; May 9, 1940 New York City, New York, U.S.
- Died: August 24, 2008 (aged 68) Sarasota, Florida, U.S.
- Party: Democratic
- Education: Hofstra University
- Known for: Pleaded guilty to grand larceny, commercial bribe receiving and making illegal campaign contributions.

Linda Winikow (May 9, 1940 – August 24, 2008) was an American politician from New York. Winikow pleaded guilty to grand larceny, commercial bribe receiving and making illegal campaign contributions.

== Early life ==
On May 9, 1940, Winikow was born as Linda Bord in New York City. Winikow's family lived in Hewlett, New York.

== Education ==
Winikow graduated from Hofstra University. Then she taught history at a high school in Long Island.

== Career ==
Winikow entered politics as a Democrat, and became a member of the Town of Ramapo Zoning Board of Appeals in 1968; a member of the Ramapo Town Council in 1972; and a member of the Rockland County Legislature in 1974.

Winikow was a member of the New York State Senate from 1975 to 1984, sitting in the 181st, 182nd, 183rd, 184th and 185th New York State Legislatures. She was a delegate to the 1980 Democratic National Convention but in June 1984, she announced that she would not seek re-election.

In 1979, the Supersisters trading card set was produced and distributed; card number 22 featured Winikow's name and picture.

On July 1, 1984, Winikow became the Vice President of Orange and Rockland Utilities's public relations. On August 16, 1993, she was arrested, and accused of funneling more than $250,000 of the company's money away for corrupt purposes and her personal use. Investigations showed that she had paid local newspapers to refrain from publishing articles with undesired coverage of Orange and Rockland Utilities and the company's top employees; that she forced the utility's advertising company to pay kickbacks; and that she made contributions to the election campaigns, using the company's money but declaring it as coming from different sources. On October 6, 1993, she pleaded guilty in Rockland County Court to grand larceny, commercial bribe receiving and making illegal campaign contributions. In 1995, she was sentenced to nine months in the Rockland county jail.

== Personal life ==
Winikow's husband was Arnold Winikow (1936–2000). In 1964, Winikow and her family moved to Spring Valley, New York, Rockland County. She was Jewish.

Winikow died on August 24, 2008, in Sarasota, Florida at the age of 68.

New York State Senate
| Preceded by Donald Ackerson | Member of the New York Senate from the 38th district 1975–1985 | Succeeded by Eugene Levy |
