= Anthony V. Gazzara =

American politician (1937–2025)

Member of the New York State Senate from the 14th district
- In office March 2, 1976 – May 23, 1983
- Preceded by: John J. Moore
- Succeeded by: George Onorato

Member of the New York State Assembly from the 36th district
- In office February 14, 1974 – March 2, 1976
- Preceded by: Joseph S. Calabretta
- Succeeded by: Denis J. Butler

Personal details
- Born: July 11, 1937 Queens, New York
- Died: April 3, 2025 (aged 87) New York
- Party: Democratic

Anthony V. Gazzara (July 11, 1937 – April 3, 2025) was an American lawyer and politician from New York.

== Life ==
Gazzara was born on July 11, 1937, in Astoria, Queens, New York City. He attended Public School no. 4, and Long Island City High School. He graduated from the City College of New York and Brooklyn Law School. He was admitted to the bar in 1962, practiced law in New York City, and entered politics as a Democrat. He married Marilyn, and they had two children.

On February 14, 1974, he was elected to the New York State Assembly, to fill the vacancy caused by the election of Joseph S. Calabretta to the New York City Civil Court. He was re-elected in November 1974, and sat in the 180th and 181st New York State Legislatures.

On March 2, 1976, Gazzara was elected to the New York State Senate, to fill the vacancy caused by the death of John J. Moore. He was re-elected four times, and remained in the Senate until 1983, sitting in the 181st, 182nd, 183rd, 184th and 185th New York State Legislatures. He resigned his seat on May 23, 1983, and was appointed Chairman of the New York State Liquor Authority.

He resigned the post on the Liquor Authority on February 28, 1985, to get a job as a Vice President in the administration of the Jacob K. Javits Convention Center.

He was a judge of the New York City Civil Court from 1994 to 2003.

Gazzara died in New York on April 3, 2025, at the age of 87.

New York State Assembly
Preceded by Joseph S. Calabretta	New York State Assembly; 36th District; 1974–1976	Succeeded by Denis J. Butler
New York State Senate
Preceded by John J. Moore	New York State Senate; 14th District; 1976–1983	Succeeded by George Onorato
