= James H. Donovan =

American businessman and politician

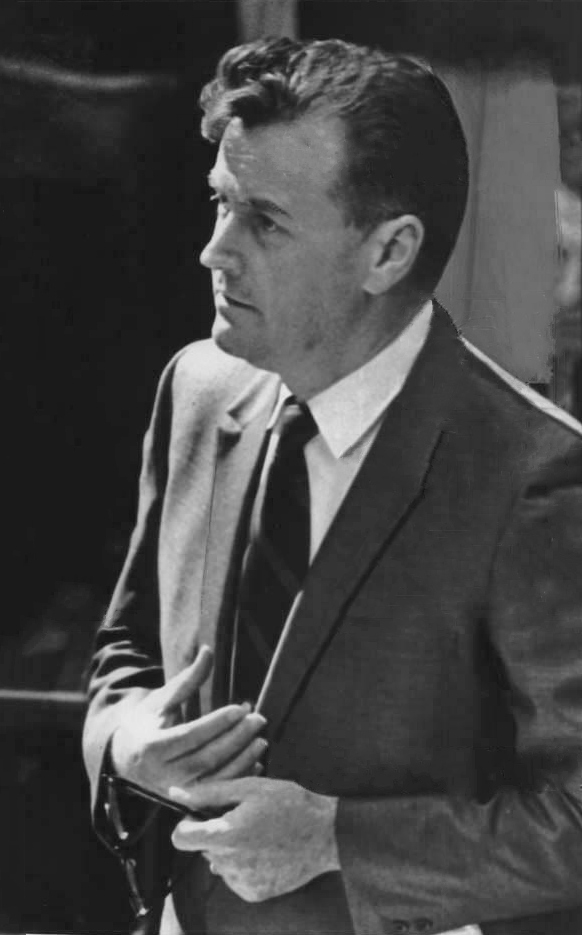

New York State Senator
- In office 1966–1990
- Succeeded by: William R. Sears
- Constituency: 51st district (1966); 44th district (1967-1972); 46th district (1973-1982); 47th district (1983-1990)

Personal details
- Born: November 12, 1923 Holland Patent, New York, U.S.
- Died: August 31, 1990 (aged 66) Chadwicks, New York, U.S.
- Party: Republican
- Spouse: Esther Moretti Donovan
- Children: 7
- Occupation: Contractor, politician

James H. Donovan (November 12, 1923 – August 31, 1990) was an American businessman and politician from New York.

== Biography ==
He was born on November 12, 1923, in Holland Patent, Oneida County, New York. He grew up on a farm in Marcy. During World War II he served in the U.S. Marine Corps. He engaged in the contracting business in Washington Mills. He married Esther Moretti, and they had seven children.

He was a New Hartford Town Councilman in 1962 and 1963; and Supervisor of the Town of New Hartford in 1964 and 1965. He was a member of the New York State Senate from 1966 until his death in 1990, sitting in the 176th, 177th, 178th, 179th, 180th, 181st, 182nd, 183rd, 184th, 185th, 186th, 187th and 188th New York State Legislatures. He was Chairman of the Committee on Education from 1977 to 1990.

He died on August 31, 1990, at his home in Chadwicks, a hamlet in the Town of New Hartford, New York, of colon cancer.

== Legacy ==
The visible legacy of Sen. James H. Donovan demonstrates the aggressive influence he brought to Albany on behalf of the people of Oneida County. James H. Donovan has also had his name memorialized on a college building, a school, and a baseball stadium.

That record actually began before Donovan went to Albany. He was recognized by Newsweek magazine for (with attorney Phil Rayhill) leading the effort to create one of the first multi-government sewer districts in the nation. . Sen. Donovan was then the New Hartford town supervisor.

From 1966 until his death August 31, 1990, Donovan affected state and local issues with a vigor rarely seen in the state capital. His first chairmanship, of the Committee on Roads and Public Works (later the Transportation Committee) produced the “Donovan Plan, which reworked the state-wide plan for rural farm-to-market roads.

In his next chairmanship, of the Committee on Mental Hygiene and Addiction Control (and concomitantly, of the Select committee and Mental and Physical Handicap), his laws improved regulations of Family Care Homes, lessened considerably the politics in appointments to Boards of Visitors at state mental health centers, and improved vigilance against patient abuse at such centers.

His law established Independent Living Centers to help the handicapped live as independently as possible, and the center in Utica became a statewide model. The Donovan legislation was the result of visits to mental health facilities and public hearings he held from Erie County to Suffolk County.

=== Senate Education Committee ===
Donovan’s last chairmanship was of the Senate Education Committee, which is where perhaps he made his biggest mark. As a boy, he started learning in a one-room schoolhouse. As a senator, he was instrumental in bringing computers and computerized teaching programs to the schools in his district and beyond.

He initiated Science and Technology Fairs that encouraged students from throughout the state to develop projects that were displayed in Albany. He created the Parents as Reading Partners program, which vastly increased the number of parents all over the state who read with their children at least 15 minutes a day.

Donovan came away from his visits to New York City schools often saddened by conditions there. He understood the need for building aid to improve them, but he never flinched from what he considered his “sworn duty” to ensure that Upstate schools got their fair share of education operating aid. He lent his considerable force to prevent New York City from getting a better-than fair share of state education aid. And although it is not commonly understood, it was this education standoff that sometimes delayed adoption of a state budget. Donovan risked criticism for the budget delays, thinking it better to hold out for Upstate's fair share.

In 1982, when taxpayers in Levittown tried to force the state to provide significantly more education aid to “poor districts,” Donovan was denied the opportunity to oppose the “Levittown” plaintiffs as a friend of the court. However, he continued to argue that if the state equalized per capita aid to all schools, it would require the doubling of the state sales tax or the equivalent to pay for it. The state's highest court recently reversed that holding, but the tax bill has yet to be determined.

Before Native Americans were granted the authority to operate casinos, the State debated whether to permit casinos operated by non-Indians. Donovan was named chairman of the Special Committee on Casinos that would study casino feasibility in New York. The constitutional amendment that would have allowed casinos never came to a referendum, disappointing several groups promoting them, particularly in the Catskills and the Far Rockaways.

Donovan's legislative scope went beyond the committees he chaired. When a motorist killed a pedestrian and drove away in Oneida County, a Donovan law significantly increased the penalty for leaving an accident scene. Until then, it was cheaper to leave the scene than face a DWI charge.

Donovan thought it was unfair to force graduates of foreign medical schools to take more licensing examinations than domestic medical school graduates. He went to Chicago and told the Federation of State Medical Board of the United States of the unfairness. Three days later, when Donovan was hospitalized with the cancer that would eventually take his life, the federation resolved to require one examination for all medical school graduates.

When New York City wanted to spend $1.6 billion on a proposed $4.2 mile “Westway” highway, Donovan lashed out at the cost, pointing out that the city wanted 90 per cent federal Interstate Highway aid that would wipe out Interstate allocations elsewhere in the state for more than 10 years. “Westway” was defeated. Similarly, Donovan jumped into the battle when it was suggested that Hinckley Reservoir be enlarged by flooding an additional 10,000 acres to augment New York City's water supply 250 miles away. The proposal was defeated. When Mohawk Indians occupied the state's Moss Lake property, Donovan was again in the forefront of local opponents urging their eviction. They were – when they were given a tract of land much further north in the Adirondack Park.

Donovan secured state aid for dozens of projects in his district, which, depending on the current redistricting, sometimes included Herkimer and Lewis Counties. They ranged from the renovation of the majestic interior of the Stanley Theater to erecting a covered bridge in Old Forge, from building a youth center in Cornhill to buying an ice resurfacer for the Whitestown Community Center. It would be hard to find a town or village that didn't benefit from his actions

Donovan's tireless efforts produced what is now the State University of New York Institute of Technology. From the start, Donovan argued for a SUNY campus in the Town of Marcy.  He had to overcome two major efforts to build the college, one in Downtown Utica, the other adjacent to Utica College .The local newspapers railed against him: “DONOVAN WRONG ON COLLEGE STAND,” they said.  Donovan prevailed. After a 17-year fight, the college opened as a two-year college for junior and senior students in an old mill in Utica.  From that Upper Division status, it has become a full four year institution on a Marcy site that provides plenty of room for expansion.  And this high school graduate who started his education in a one-room school house, went on to receive an honorary Doctor of Laws degree. In 2002, the SUNY Board of Trustees approved a mission change, changing the name to SUNY Polytechnic Institute.

=== Eliminating or reducing abortions in New York ===
Donovan was the primary force to eliminate or reduce abortions in New York State. It was a battle that he fought from the time that abortion became legal in 1970 until his death 20 years later. It led to Gannett News Service describing him as “having the ingredient it takes to make a great legislator – courage.” That description resulted in part from his refusal to vote on a bill establishing abortion regulations. When the Senate majority leader threatened to hold him in contempt of the Senate, Donovan said, “So be it. I will be in contempt of this house. I will not be in contempt of human life.”

During his tenure, the longest of any Senator in Oneida County history, Donovan involved himself in most of the important issues affecting the state and his own senatorial district. He passed more than 400 laws, taking credit only for those of which he was the principal sponsor. His voice was such that right up until he died, the media was asking him which way he would vote on capital punishment. No one ever found out.

Before his legislative service, Donovan was a contractor, specializing in roofing. He served two tours of Pacific duty as a Marine in World War II. He married Esther Moretti and lived in Chadwicks with their seven children: Gary, James A., Karen, Jerome, Michael, Barry and Kim.

His legacy of service continues today through a scholarship fund he established at SUNY Institute of Technology and two donor-advised funds, the Senator James H. Donovan Memorial Fund and the Senator James H. Donovan Scholarship Fund established by his family and administered by the Community Foundation of Herkimer and Oneida Counties, Inc. in consultation with his son Jerome Donovan.

New York State Senate
| Preceded by Frank E. Van Lare | New York State Senate; 51st District; 1966 | Succeeded by James E. Powers |
| Preceded by Robert Watson Pomeroy | New York State Senate; 44th District; 1967–1972 | Succeeded by Mary Anne Krupsak |
| Preceded by Tarky Lombardi Jr. | New York State Senate; 46th District; 1973–1982 | Succeeded by Hugh Douglas Barclay |
| Preceded by Warren M. Anderson | New York State Senate; 47th District; 1983–1990 | Succeeded by William R. Sears |
