= Estella Diggs Park =

Public park in the Bronx, New York

Coordinates: 40.8290°N 73.9062°W

Estella Diggs Park is a 0.9-acre (0.36 ha) public park in the Morrisania neighborhood of the Bronx, New York City. It was built on one of many vacant lots in Morrisania that resulted after some of the neighborhood's buildings were abandoned and demolished in the 1960s. The New York City Parks Department acquired this property in 1978 and it was briefly used as a community garden but later became vacant again. At the time, community organizer Megan Charlop led a protest effort against the movie Fort Apache, The Bronx arguing that it negatively depicted the neighborhood. As a compromise, the producers issued a $15,000 check to the fledgling Rock Greening Association, a community land trust Charlop had helped establish to acquire the empty lot where filming took place. The lot was then given to the city. In 1990, additional lots were acquired by Parks and the site was named Rocks and Roots Park.

In 2011, a complete reconstruction of the park by Nancy Owens Studio preserved its naturalistic contours while including public gathering and sitting areas, handicapped-accessible walking paths and landscaped gardens. On November 7, 2011, the park was renamed for Estella Diggs in a ceremony attended by Diggs, local community leaders, and a choir from Diggs’ church. In May 2012, the corner of Fulton Avenue and East 167th Street facing the park was co-named Megan Charlop Way in honor of her efforts in transforming the undeveloped lot into a public space.

In 2015, construction commenced on the lowland section of the park, expanding its lawns, paths and seating areas. The park reopened to the public on August 29, 2017.
