= Richard Kennedy (New York politician) =

American politician

Richard L. Kennedy

Member of the New York State Assembly from the 147th district
- In office December 31, 1978 – January 1, 1983
- Preceded by: Ronald H. Tills
- Succeeded by: Bill Paxon

Personal details
- Party: Republican

Richard L. Kennedy was an American politician who served in the New York State Assembly from the 147th district from 1978 to 1983.

== See also ==
- 183rd New York State Legislature
- 184th New York State Legislature
