= Arthur J. Cooperman =

American politician

Arthur J. Cooperman (born December 22, 1933) is an American lawyer and politician from New York.

== Life ==
He was born on December 22, 1933, in the Bronx, New York City. He attended Public School No. 11 and William Howard Taft High School. He graduated from New York University in 1955, served as a first lieutenant in the U.S. Army Signal Corps, and graduated from New York University School of Law in 1960. He was admitted to the bar in December 1960, practiced law in Queens, and entered politics as a Democrat.

He was a member of the New York State Assembly from 1969 to 1979, sitting in the 178th, 179th, 180th, 181st, 182nd, and 183rd New York State Legislature. In November 1979, he was elected to the New York City Civil Court.

In November 1981, he was elected to the New York Supreme Court, and remained on the bench until the end of 2009 when he reached the constitutional age limit. From February to April 2008, he presided over the trial of the police officers in the Sean Bell shooting incident. The case was heard without a jury, and Justice Cooperman acquitted the policemen.

New York State Assembly
Preceded by Seymour Boyers	New York State Assembly; 24th District; 1969–1972	Succeeded by Saul Weprin
Preceded by Herbert J. Miller	New York State Assembly; 27th District; 1973–1979	Succeeded by David L. Cohen
