= Daniel Hevesi =

American politician

Member of the New York Senate from the 13th district
- In office January 6, 1999 – December 31, 2002
- Preceded by: Emanuel R. Gold
- Succeeded by: Toby Ann Stavisky (redistricting)

Personal details
- Born: 1970 (age 55–56)
- Party: Democratic

Daniel Hevesi is a former American politician.

Daniel Hevesi was born to Alan and Carol Hevesi. He has a sister, Laura, and a brother, Andrew.

Daniel Hevesi contested the 1998 New York Senate elections, and won election from the 13th district. He faced Conservative Party candidate Walter Lamp in the 2000 election cycle. Hevesi served until 2002, when his district was redrawn, citing partisan politics and Republican control of the senate as his reason for stepping down. Had he run, he would have had to face fellow incumbent Toby Ann Stavisky.

In 2007, Hevesi was asked to provide financial records for a business he owned during a probe targeting his father's actions as New York State Comptroller. The New York Times reported in 2010 that Daniel and Andrew Hevesi's participation in the investigation of their father convinced the elder Hevesi to negotiate a plea bargain. Linked to the investigation, attorney general Andrew Cuomo later accused Saul Meyer of helping Daniel Hevesi earn a $250,000 placement fee from the pension fund of the government of New Mexico. The New Mexico State Investment Council filed a lawsuit against Meyer and Hevesi, among others, with the United States District Court for the District of New Mexico in May 2011.
