= Cecile D. Singer =

American politician

Member of the New York State Assembly
- In office January 1, 1989 – December 31, 1994
- Preceded by: Gordon W. Burrows
- Succeeded by: Mike Spano
- Constituency: 84th district (1989-1992); 87th district (1993-1994)

Personal details
- Born: 1929 (age 96–97)
- Party: Republican
- Spouse: David Singer
- Children: 2

Cecile D. Singer (born c. 1929) is an American politician from New York.

== Life ==
She was born in 1929. The family lived in Forest Hills, Queens. She graduated from Queens College, CUNY. Cecile married David H. Singer (1924–2009), and they had two daughters. They lived for some time in Rockford, Illinois, and then in Chicago. In 1955, they moved to Yonkers, New York.

She entered politics as a Republican, and was an aide to Assemblyman Gordon W. Burrows, and executive director of several Assembly committees, for more than twenty years. In 1988, Burrows was nominated for the New York Supreme Court, and Cecile Singer was nominated to run for the open Assembly seat.

She was a member of the New York State Assembly from 1989 to 1994, sitting in the 188th, 189th, and 190th New York State Legislatures.

She was a director of the Hudson Valley Bank from 1994 to January 1, 2013, and has been Principal of the Cecile D. Singer Consulting firm since 1995. She also remained active in the community and women's affairs. She lives in Tuckahoe. She is Jewish.

New York State Assembly
Preceded by Gordon W. Burrows	New York State Assembly; 84th District; 1989–1992	Succeeded by J. Gary Pretlow
Preceded by Peter M. Sullivan	New York State Assembly; 87th District; 1993–1994	Succeeded by Mike Spano
