= George W. Miller (politician) =

American lawyer and politician

George W. Miller (November 19, 1922 – October 17, 1997) was an American lawyer and politician from New York.

== Life ==
Miller was born on November 19, 1922, in Rutherfordton, Rutherford County, North Carolina. There he attended the public schools. He graduated from North Carolina Agricultural and Technical State University in 1943. He graduated from Brooklyn Law School in 1955. He practiced law in Harlem, New York City.

Miller was a member of the New York State Assembly from 1971 to 1980, sitting in the 179th, 180th, 181st, 182nd and 183rd New York State Legislatures. He rose to the position of Majority Whip. In 1980, he ran for re-nomination, but was defeated in the Democratic primary by Geraldine L. Daniels. Miller then ran in the general election on the Republican ticket, but was again defeated by Daniels.

He died on October 17, 1997.

== Sources ==
New York State Assembly
Preceded by Charles B. Rangel	New York State Assembly; 72nd District; 1971–1974	Succeeded by Angelo Del Toro
Preceded by Franz S. Leichter	New York State Assembly; 71st District; 1975–1980	Succeeded by Geraldine L. Daniels
