= Emanuel R. Gold =

American lawyer and politician (1935–2013)

Member of the New York State Senate
- In office December 1971 – December 31, 1998
- Preceded by: Seymour R. Thaler
- Succeeded by: Daniel Hevesi
- Constituency: 10th district (1971-1972); 13th district (1973-1998)

Member of the New York State Assembly from the 25th district
- In office November 1970 – 1971
- Preceded by: Moses M. Weinstein
- Succeeded by: Alan Hevesi

Personal details
- Born: August 25, 1935 Brooklyn, New York, U.S.
- Died: January 24, 2013 (aged 77)
- Party: Democratic

Emanuel R. Gold (August 25, 1935 – January 24, 2013) was an American lawyer and politician from New York.

== Life ==
He was born on August 25, 1935, in Brooklyn, New York City. He attended Stuyvesant High School. He graduated from Cornell University College of Arts and Sciences and Cornell Law School. He practiced law and entered politics as a Democrat. He married Judith Silberfein, and they had four children. They lived in Forest Hills, Queens.

He was Counsel to the Majority Leader of the New York State Assembly from 1965 to 1968; and Counsel to the Majority Leader of the New York State Constitutional Convention of 1967.

On February 17, 1970, Gold was elected to the New York State Assembly (25th D.), to fill the vacancy caused by the election of Moses M. Weinstein to the New York Supreme Court. In November 1970, he was re-elected, sitting in the 178th and 179th New York State Legislatures. He resigned his Assembly seat to run for the Senate seat vacated by Seymour R. Thaler.

On November 2, 1971, Gold was elected to the New York State Senate, and took his seat in the 179th New York State Legislature during the special session in December 1971. He was re-elected several times, and remained in the Senate until 1998, sitting also in the 180th, 181st, 182nd, 183rd, 184th, 185th, 186th, 187th, 188th, 189th, 190th, 191st and 192nd New York State Legislatures. He was the author of the first Son of Sam law, enacted in 1977. He was at times Deputy Minority Leader; and the ranking minority member of the Committee on Finance.

He died on January 24, 2013, at the age of 78. He was Jewish.

New York State Assembly
Preceded by Moses M. Weinstein	New York State Assembly; 25th District; 1970–1971	Succeeded by Alan Hevesi
New York State Senate
Preceded by Seymour R. Thaler	New York State Senate; 10th District; 1971–1972	Succeeded by John J. Santucci
Preceded by Nicholas Ferraro	New York State Senate; 13th District; 1973–1998	Succeeded by Daniel Hevesi
