= Willis H. Stephens =

American politician in New York (1925–2024)

Willis H. Stephens (June 7, 1925 – October 17, 2024) was an American politician who was a member of the New York State Assembly from Brewster, New York.

== Life and career ==
Stephens was a member of the State Assembly from 1953 to 1982, sitting in the 169th, 170th, 171st, 172nd, 173rd, 174th, 175th, 176th, 177th, 178th, 179th, 180th, 181st, 182nd, 183rd and 184th New York State Legislature. As Chairman of the Committee on Ways and Means, from 1969 to 1974, Stephens was considered one of the most powerful and influential men in New York.

His father, D. Mallory Stephens, served the same constituency from 1926 to 1952 and his son, Willis H. Stephens Jr., served in the seat from 1995 to 2006.

His grandfather, Henry B. Stephens, was a two-term Sheriff of Putnam County, New York, and his great-grandfather, Daniel B. Mallory, was a member of the Connecticut State Senate.

Stephens was a lifelong resident of Brewster. He died at the Putnam Hospital Center in Carmel, New York, on October 17, 2024, at the age of 99.

New York State Assembly
Preceded by D. Mallory Stephens	New York State Assembly; Putnam County; 1953–1965	Succeeded by district abolished
Preceded by new district	New York State Assembly; 107th District; 1966	Succeeded by Lawrence E. Corbett Jr.
Preceded by Gordon W. Burrows	New York State Assembly; 97th District; 1967–1972	Succeeded by Lawrence Herbst
Preceded by Eugene Levy	New York State Assembly; 94th District; 1973–1982	Succeeded by Mary M. McPhillips
Preceded by Harvey M. Lifset	New York State Assembly; Chairman of the Committee on Ways and Means; 1969–1974	Succeeded by Burton Hecht
