= Louis Niñé =

American politician (1922–1983)

Member of the New York State Assembly
- In office January 1, 1971 – March 14, 1983
- Preceded by: Edward A. Stevenson Sr.
- Succeeded by: Hector L. Diaz
- Constituency: 78th district (1971–1972); 79th district (1973–1982); 78th district (1983)

Personal details
- Born: December 18, 1922 Mayagüez, Puerto Rico
- Died: March 14, 1983 (aged 60) Bronx, New York
- Party: Democratic

Military service
- Allegiance: United States of America
- Branch/service: United States Army
- Battles/wars: World War II

Louis Niñé (December 18, 1922 – March 14, 1983) was an American politician from New York.

== Life ==
Louis Niñé (the surname is pronounced neen-YAY) was born on December 18, 1922, in Mayagüez, Puerto Rico. There he attended grammar school and high school. During World War II he served in the United States Army. He graduated with a B.S. from Fordham University in 1950. He worked for the New York City Social Services, then for the New York State Department of Labor, and entered politics as a Democrat. Later he engaged in the real estate and insurance business. He married Jutta Bock and they had two children, Anna and Joseph.

He was a member of the New York State Assembly from 1971 until his death in 1983, sitting in the 179th, 180th, 181st, 182nd, 183rd, 184th and 185th New York State Legislatures. He was Chairman of the Democratic Assembly Conference from 1976 to 1980. In 1978, he ran on the Democratic and Conservative tickets in the special election to fill the vacancy in Congress caused by the resignation of Herman Badillo. In the Democratic primary he defeated State Senator Robert García, but in the special election Niñé was defeated by Garcia who ran on the Republican and Liberal tickets.

Niñé died on March 14, 1983, at his home in the Bronx, of cancer.

Louis Niñé Boulevard (formerly Wilkins Av), in Crotona Park East, Bronx, was named in his honor in 1985.

New York State Assembly
Preceded by Edward A. Stevenson Sr.	New York State Assembly; 78th District; 1971–1972	Succeeded by Estella B. Diggs
Preceded by Manuel Ramos	New York State Assembly; 79th District; 1973–1982	Succeeded by George Friedman
Preceded by Herman D. Farrell Jr.	New York State Assembly; 78th District; 1983	Succeeded by Hector L. Diaz
