= John R. Dunne =

American politician (1930–2020)

Member of the New York Senate
- In office January 1966 – September 1989
- Preceded by: Norman F. Lent
- Succeeded by: Kemp Hannon
- Constituency: 7th district (1966); 6th district (1967-1989)

Assistant United States Attorney General for the Civil Rights Division
- In office 1990–1994
- President: George H.W. Bush
- Preceded by: James P. Turner
- Succeeded by: Deval Patrick

Personal details
- Born: John Richard Dunne; January 28, 1930 Baldwin, New York, U.S.
- Died: November 1, 2020 (aged 90)
- Party: Republican
- Spouse: Denise Dunne
- Education: Georgetown University (BA); Yale University (LLB)
- Profession: Attorney
- Website: Whiteman Osterman & Hanna

John Richard Dunne (January 28, 1930 – November 1, 2020) was a Republican politician, and lawyer from Long Island, New York. Dunne was a major figure in New York Republican politics in the second half of the 20th century. He is best remembered for his twenty-three years in the New York State Senate and his involvement in the Attica prison riots.

== Personal life ==
Dunne was born in Baldwin, New York, and attended Garden City High School, where he was a member of the 1945 Nassau County Championship baseball team. He graduated from Georgetown University in 1951, and received his law degree from Yale Law School in 1954. He married Denise in 1958 and they had four children together. Dunne resided in Garden City and Columbia County. He was senior counsel at the Albany law firm of Whiteman Osterman & Hanna. He was also a director of several corporations.

== In the State Senate ==
Dunne was a member of the New York State Senate from 1966 to 1989, sitting in the 176th, 177th, 178th, 179th, 180th, 181st, 182nd, 183rd, 184th, 185th, 186th, 187th and 188th New York State Legislatures.

Dunne served as Deputy Majority Leader, as well as chairman or ranking member of six committees. Numerous Republican public figures from Long Island served on Dunne's staff, including Michael Balboni.

Dunne was a major figure in the Attica prison riots of 1971. At the time, Dunne was chairman of the Senate Corrections Committee, which oversees the prison system. At one dramatic moment during the riot, Dunne entered the prison with New York Times editor Tom Wicker and Assemblyman Arthur Eve to negotiate with the prisoners. He strongly criticized Governor Nelson Rockefeller for the latter's actions, including a refusal to visit the prison, and argued that the prison standoff could have ended without bloodshed if state officials had acted differently.

Dunne was an original sponsor of the Rockefeller drug laws in 1973, but by the 2000s argued for major changes in New York drug laws. Dunne sponsored the New York law that protects the confidentiality of tests for HIV/AIDS.

He was regularly mentioned as a possible candidate for other offices, including statewide offices. In 1977, he sought the Republican nomination for Nassau County Executive, but lost the primary election.

He resigned his seat in September 1989. Dunne's papers from his days in the Senate are archived at the New York State Modern Political Archive at the University at Albany.

== George H. W. Bush administration and later legal career ==
In 1990, President George H. W. Bush nominated Dunne to be Assistant Attorney General for Civil Rights. His appointment was supported by members of both parties, including Mario Cuomo, Charles Rangel and Richard Thornburgh.

After serving at the Justice Department, Dunne became a partner in the firm of Rivkin Radler LLP, then known as Rivkin, Radler, Dunne & Bayh.

He was recognized several times for his contribution to the law in New York State, earning the New York State Bar Association's Gold Medal Award in 2006, among other awards. In 2003, the New York State Bar Foundation named its fund for legal services for indigent persons after Dunne.

In 2006, Dunne was appointed chairman of a task force charged with reforming the state probation system.

== 2009 New York State Senate leadership crisis ==
On June 20, 2009, Governor David Paterson asked Dunne and former Lieutenant Governor Stan Lundine to serve as special mediators to resolve the 2009 New York State Senate leadership crisis.

== General Reference ==
- John R. Dunne Papers, 1943-1970. M.E. Grenander Department of Special Collections and Archives, University Libraries, University at Albany, State University of New York (hereafter referred to as the Dunne Papers).

New York State Senate
Preceded by Seymour R. Thaler	New York State Senate; 7th District; 1966	Succeeded by Norman F. Lent
Preceded by Norman F. Lent	New York State Senate; 6th District; 1967–1989	Succeeded by Kemp Hannon
