= D. Mallory Stephens =

American politician (1893–1961)

Daniel Mallory Stephens

Assemblyman, Putnam County (1926-1952)
- In office 1926–1952
- Succeeded by: Willis H. Stephens

Personal details
- Born: December 17, 1893 Patterson, New York, U.S.
- Died: January 11, 1961 (aged 67) New York City, New York, U.S.
- Party: Republican
- Spouse: Grace Hine
- Children: 3
- Occupation: Businessman

Daniel Mallory Stephens (December 17, 1893 - January 11, 1961) was a local and state politician and member of the New York State Assembly from Patterson, New York.

== Political career and background ==
He was born at the family farm that is now part of the Thunder Ridge Ski Area on New York State Route 22. He was the son of Henry B. Stephens, a two-term Sheriff of Putnam County, New York, and Alice Mallory Stephens. He attended school in Patterson, and graduated from Brewster High School. Stephens worked for the Harlem Valley Electric Company after high school, and worked with crews that brought the first electric service to Patterson and Pawling. In 1914, he was married to Grace Hine of Brewster, and had three children. During World War I, he served in the United States Navy. In 1927, the couple relocated to Brewster.

In 1923, he was elected Supervisor of the Town of Patterson. He was a member of the New York State Assembly (Putnam Co.) in 1926, 1927, 1928, 1929, 1930, 1931, 1932, 1933, 1934, 1935, 1936, 1937, 1938, 1939–40, 1941–42, 1943–44, 1945–46, 1947–48, 1949–50 and 1951–52. He was Chairman of the Committee on Ways and Means Committee for nine years, and at times sat on the Rules Committee, the New York City Committee, the Public Service Committee, Joint Legislative Committee on Banking, the Committee on Military Affairs, and the legislative group formed to investigate the dairy industry. He was also chairman of the Putnam County Republican Committee for several years, which gave him influence over candidates for local office. In 1952, he retired from the Assembly, and the seat was taken over by his son Willis H. Stephens.

Mallory Stephens was a shrewd businessman whose interests included the 525-acre (2.12 km^{2}) Stephens homestead farm, which he sold in 1956 to the business group that created the Birch Hill Game Farm there. The historic Little Red Schoolhouse in Patterson was also located on the Stephens farm, where his wife taught and his daughter Alice attended. He was also an officer of the Maust, Coal, and Coke Corporation, an officer of the Modern Industrial Bank alongside Channing H. Tobias, and the Knickerbocker Associates, a real estate and insurance firm. Stephens was a member of the Patterson Presbyterian Church, the Patterson Grange, the Putnam Westchester Pomona Grange, and the National Grange.

Stephens died in New York Hospital on January 11, 1961, of a heart ailment. He was buried in the Maple Avenue Cemetery in Patterson. His son, Willis, and grandson, Willis Jr., occupied his assembly seat from 1952 until 2006. By H.R. 5685 of the United States Congress, the United States Postal Service office located at 19 Front Street in Patterson is known as the D. Mallory Stephens Post Office.

== See also ==
- List of members of the New York State Assembly

New York State Assembly
| Preceded by John R. Yale | New York State Assembly; Putnam County; 1926–1952 | Succeeded by Willis H. Stephens |
| Preceded by Abbot Low Moffat | New York State Assembly; Chairman of the Committee on Ways and Means; 1943–1952 | Succeeded by William H. MacKenzie |
