= George A. Cincotta =

American politician

George A. Cincotta (December 5, 1914 – April 16, 1985) was an American politician from New York.

== Life ==
Cincotta, an Italian American Democrat, was a member of the New York City Council from Central Brooklyn in 1958.

He was a member of the New York State Assembly from 1959 to 1978, sitting in the 172nd, 173rd, 174th, 175th, 176th, 177th, 178th, 179th, 180th, 181st and 182nd New York State Legislatures. He represented Central Brooklyn, including portions of Crown Heights, Flatbush and Prospect Heights.

In the Assembly he became chairman of the Committee on Banks. Free Checking in New York State came through a bill which he coauthored with Senator William T. Conklin. Cincotta left the Assembly in 1978 to become Chairman of the New York State Commission on Cable Television (CCT) and he retired from that post in 1981.

New York State Assembly
Preceded by Eugene F. Bannigan	New York State Assembly; Kings County, 11th District; 1959–1965	Succeeded by district abolished
Preceded by new district	New York State Assembly; 52nd District; 1966	Succeeded by Joseph J. Dowd
Preceded by Max M. Turshen	New York State Assembly; 43rd District; 1967–1978	Succeeded by Rhoda S. Jacobs
