= Estella B. Diggs =

American politician

Estella B. Diggs (April 21, 1916 – April 18, 2013) was an American businesswoman, writer and politician from New York.

== Life ==
She was born on April 21, 1916, in St. Louis, Missouri. She attended Pace College, City College of New York and New York University. She was in the real estate and catering businesses and was a career counselor. She was also a writer.

Estella Diggs was a member of the New York State Assembly from 1973 to 1980, sitting in the 180th, 181st, 182nd and 183rd New York State Legislatures. She represented the Morrisania section of the Bronx. She helped write more than 70 bills and was responsible for the first Women's, Infants, and Children's program in the state and the first sobering-up station in the Bronx. On November 7, 2011, Estella Diggs Park was dedicated in the Morrisania neighborhood.

She died in 2013, three days before her 97th birthday, in a hospital in the Bronx.

New York State Assembly
Preceded by Louis Niñé	New York State Assembly; 78th District; 1973–1980	Succeeded by Gloria Davis
