= Leonard F. Bersani =

American politician

Member of the New York State Assembly from the 118th district
- In office January 1, 1977 – December 31, 1980
- Preceded by: Ronald A. Stott
- Succeeded by: Michael J. Bragman
- In office January 1, 1969 – December 31, 1974
- Preceded by: James J. Barry
- Succeeded by: Ronald A. Stott

Personal details
- Born: November 21, 1932 Syracuse, New York
- Died: April 12, 2000 (aged 67)
- Party: Republican

Leonard F. Bersani (November 21, 1932 – April 12, 2000) was an American politician who served in the New York State Assembly from the 118th district from 1969 to 1974 and from 1977 to 1980.
