= Joseph S. Calabretta =

American politician

Member of the New York State Assembly from the 36th district
- In office January 1, 1973 – December 31, 1973
- Preceded by: Peter G. Mirto
- Succeeded by: Anthony V. Gazzara

Member of the New York State Assembly from the 33rd district
- In office February 1968 – December 31, 1972
- Preceded by: Thomas V. LaFauci
- Succeeded by: John T. Flack

Personal details
- Born: February 19, 1917 Queens, New York City, New York
- Died: June 10, 1993 (aged 76) Manhasset, New York
- Party: Democratic

Joseph S. Calabretta (February 19, 1917 – June 10, 1993) was an American politician who served in the New York State Assembly from 1968 to 1973.

He died of a stroke on June 10, 1993, in Manhasset, New York at age 76.
