= Thomas F. McGowan =

American politician

Thomas McGowan

Justice of the New York Supreme Court
- In office 1974–1990

Member of the New York State Senate
- In office 1966–1974
- Preceded by: Theodore D. Day
- Succeeded by: Fred J. Eckert; Dale Volker
- Constituency: 62nd district (1966); 54th district (1967–1972); 58th district (1973–1974)

Personal details
- Born: August 11, 1925 Buffalo, New York, U.S.
- Died: July 23, 1997 (aged 71) Batavia, New York, U.S.
- Party: Republican
- Spouse: Dorothy Ann Rowe (m. 1951)
- Children: 6
- Education: Canisius College (BSS, MEd); University of Buffalo (JD)

Military service
- Branch/service: United States Army
- Battles/wars: World War II

Thomas F. McGowan (August 11, 1925 – July 23, 1997) was an American attorney, politician, and jurist from New York who served as a member of the New York State Senate from 1966 to 1974. He was later a justice of the New York Supreme Court from 1974 to 1990.

== Early life and education ==
McGowan was born on August 11, 1925, in Buffalo, New York. During World War II, he served in the United States Army, reaching the rank of corporal. He earned a Bachelor of Social Science in 1950 and M.Ed. in 1953 from Canisius College. He later earned a Juris Doctor from the University of Buffalo Law School in 1957

== Career ==
From 1947 to 1957, he was an officer in the Buffalo Police Department. After graduating from law school, he was admitted to the bar and practiced law in Buffalo. He served as assistant D.A. of Erie County, New York from 1957 to 1967, and entered politics as a Republican.

McGowan was a member of the board of supervisors of Erie County from 1962 to 1963 and a member of the New York State Senate from 1966 to 1974, sitting in the 176th, 177th, 178th, 179th and 180th New York State Legislatures. In November 1974, he was re-elected, but he resigned his seat upon appointment to the New York Supreme Court. In November 1976, he was elected to a 14-year term on the Supreme Court, remaining on the bench until the end of 1990. On September 18, 1991, he was appointed as a Judge of the Buffalo City Court, to fill the vacancy caused by the resignation of Alois Mazur, and remained on the bench until the end of the year.

== Personal life ==
In 1951, he married Dorothy Ann Rowe (1926–2011), and they had six children. McGowan died on July 23, 1997, in the veterans unit of Genesee Memorial Hospital in Batavia, New York. He was buried at Arlington National Cemetery.

New York State Senate
Preceded by new district	New York State Senate; 62nd District; 1966	Succeeded by district abolished
Preceded by Theodore D. Day	New York State Senate; 54th District; 1967–1972	Succeeded by Fred J. Eckert
Preceded by new district	New York State Senate; 58th District; 1973–1974	Succeeded by Dale Volker
