= Edward J. Amann Jr. =

American politician

Member of the New York State Assembly from the 61st district
- In office January 1, 1973 – August 27, 1973
- Preceded by: Anthony G. DiFalco
- Succeeded by: Elizabeth Connelly

Member of the New York State Assembly from the 59th district
- In office January 1, 1967 – December 31, 1972
- Preceded by: Dominick L. DiCarlo
- Succeeded by: Peter G. Mirto

Member of the New York State Assembly from the 65th district
- In office January 1, 1966 – December 31, 1966
- Preceded by: Jerome Kretchmer
- Succeeded by: District abolished

Member of the New York State Assembly from Richmond's 1st district
- In office January 1, 1953 – December 31, 1965
- Preceded by: William N. Reidy
- Succeeded by: District abolished

Personal details
- Born: July 17, 1925 Manhattan, New York City, New York
- Died: July 15, 2009 (aged 83) Staten Island, New York City, New York
- Party: Republican

Edward J. Amann Jr. (July 17, 1925 – July 15, 2009) was an American politician who served in the New York State Assembly from 1953 to 1973.

He died on July 15, 2009, in Staten Island, New York City, New York at age 83.
