= Lawrence Herbst =

American politician

Member of the New York State Assembly from the 97th district
- In office January 1, 1973 – December 31, 1978
- Preceded by: Willis H. Stephens
- Succeeded by: William J. Larkin Jr.

Member of the New York State Assembly from the 96th district
- In office January 1, 1971 – December 31, 1972
- Preceded by: Daniel Becker
- Succeeded by: Harold K. Grune

Personal details
- Born: March 5, 1916 Brooklyn, New York, U.S.
- Died: May 12, 2003 (aged 87) Newburgh, New York, U.S.
- Party: Republican

Lawrence Herbst (March 5, 1916 – May 12, 2003) was an American politician who served in the New York State Assembly from 1971 to 1978.

He died on May 12, 2003, in Newburgh, New York at age 87.
