= William F. Passannante =

Politician

Member of the New York State Assembly from the 61st district
- In office January 1, 1983 – December 31, 1990
- Preceded by: Elizabeth Connelly
- Succeeded by: Deborah J. Glick

Member of the New York State Assembly from the 64th district
- In office January 1, 1973 – December 31, 1982
- Preceded by: Peter A. A. Berle
- Succeeded by: Richard N. Gottfried

Member of the New York State Assembly from the 63rd district
- In office January 1, 1967 – December 31, 1972
- Preceded by: Joseph J. Dowd
- Succeeded by: Anthony G. DiFalco

Member of the New York State Assembly from the 69th district
- In office January 1, 1966 – December 31, 1966
- Preceded by: District created
- Succeeded by: Daniel M. Kelly

Member of the New York State Assembly from New York's 1st district
- In office January 1, 1955 – December 31, 1965
- Preceded by: Maude E. Ten Eyck
- Succeeded by: District abolished

Personal details
- Born: February 10, 1920 New York City, New York
- Died: December 15, 1996 (aged 76) Manhattan, New York
- Party: Democratic
- Education: New York University (BS); Harvard University (LLB)

Military service
- Branch/service: United States Army
- Battles/wars: World War II

William F. Passannante (February 10, 1920 – December 15, 1996) was an American politician and attorney who served in the New York State Assembly from 1955 to 1990.

== Early life and education ==
Passannante was born and raised in Greenwich Village. He was the baptismal godson of Tammany Hall boss Carmine De Sapio. After attending public schools, Passannante earned a Bachelor of Science from New York University in 1940. He served in the United States Army during World War II and later earned a Juris Doctor from Harvard Law School.

== Career ==
From 1949 to 1953, Passannante served as an assistant United States Attorney for the Southern District of New York. In 1954, he served as Legislative Counsel to the President of the New York City Council. He was elected to the New York State Assembly in 1954, and served until his retirement in 1990.

== Death ==
He died of pancreatic cancer on December 15, 1996, in Manhattan, New York City, New York at age 76.

Passannante is the namesake of the William F. Passannante Ballfield in Greenwich Village.
