= Edward Abramson =

American politician

Member of the New York State Assembly from the 32nd district
- In office January 1, 1973 – December 31, 1990
- Preceded by: John G. Lopresto
- Succeeded by: Vivian E. Cook

Personal details
- Born: September 21, 1920 Manhattan, New York City, New York
- Died: May 10, 2012 (aged 91) Chiang Mai, Thailand
- Party: Democratic

Edward Abramson (September 21, 1920 – May 10, 2012) was an American politician who served in the New York State Assembly from the 32nd district from 1973 to 1990.

He died of pneumonia and kidney failure on May 10, 2012, in Chiang Mai, Thailand at age 91.
