= Woodrow Lewis =

American politician (1916–1989)

Member of the New York State Assembly from the 53rd district
- In office January 1, 1973 – December 31, 1982
- Preceded by: Frank J. Verderame
- Succeeded by: Victor L. Robles

Personal details
- Born: November 8, 1916 Brooklyn, New York City, New York
- Died: July 18, 1989 (aged 72) Brooklyn, New York City, New York
- Party: Democratic

Woodrow T. Lewis (November 8, 1916 – July 18, 1989) was an American politician who served in the New York State Assembly from the 53rd district from 1973 to 1982.

He died of heart failure on July 18, 1989, in Brooklyn, New York City, New York at age 72.
