= Saul Weprin =

American politician

118th Speaker of the New York State Assembly
- In office December 16, 1991 – February 11, 1994
- Governor: Mario Cuomo
- Preceded by: Mel Miller
- Succeeded by: Sheldon Silver

Member of the New York State Assembly from the 24th district
- In office December 1, 1971 – February 11, 1994
- Preceded by: Martin Rodell
- Succeeded by: Mark Weprin

Personal details
- Born: August 5, 1927 Brooklyn, New York City, U.S.
- Died: February 11, 1994 (aged 66) Queens, New York City, U.S.
- Party: Democratic
- Spouse: Sylvia Matz (m. 1950)
- Children: 3, including David and Mark
- Education: Brooklyn College (BA); Brooklyn Law School (JD)

Saul Weprin (August 5, 1927 – February 11, 1994) was an American attorney and politician. He was a Democratic member from Queens County of the New York State Assembly, and served as its Speaker from December 1991 until his death.

== Biography ==
Saul Weprin was born in Brooklyn, to Jewish parents who had emigrated from the Kiev area. He went to Thomas Jefferson High School in Brooklyn, and graduated from Brooklyn College in 1948 and Brooklyn Law School in 1951. He practiced law at the Manhattan law firm of Thelen, Marrin, Johnson & Bridges until he became Speaker of the New York State Assembly in 1991. He served in the United States Coast Guard in 1945.

In the late 1950s he became president of his cooperative apartment board in Hollis, Queens, in 1962 he became Democratic leader of the 24th Assembly District. On November 2, 1971, Weprin was elected to the New York State Assembly, to fill the vacancy caused by the resignation of Martin Rodell, and took his seat in the 179th New York State Legislature during the special session in December 1971. Weprin was re-elected several times, and remained in the Assembly until his death in 1994, sitting also in the 180th, 181st, 182nd, 183rd, 184th, 185th, 186th, 187th, 188th, 189th, 190th New York State Legislatures. There he served as chairman of the Commerce Committee and the Judiciary Committee. In 1986, he tried to become Speaker after Stanley Fink announced his resignation, but lost to Mel Miller. In 1987, he got the post of Ways and Means Committee chairman, and was instrumental in developing the Tax Reform and Reduction Act, one of the largest tax cuts in American history. On December 16, 1991, he was elected Speaker "after a lightning-like round of politicking by telephone among the Democrats in the Assembly", after Speaker Mel Miller had lost his seat in the Assembly upon being convicted on federal fraud charges, later overturned on appeal.

Weprin was an opponent of the death penalty and a supporter of abortion rights. He pushed the first gay rights bill through the Assembly, sought to increase state aid for schools in New York, and defended the state's Medicaid and welfare programs against cuts proposed by the Republican-controlled Senate.

== Personal life ==
Weprin married Sylvia Matz in 1950, a biology teacher, who was born in Cuba and emigrated to the United States with her family in 1938, when she was eight years old. He died on February 11, 1994, at the Long Island Jewish Medical Center in Queens from complications resulting from a stroke.

The couple had three sons, Barry Weprin, an attorney in New York, Mark Weprin, who won his father's former seat, and served in the Assembly until January 2010, when he was elected to the New York City Council seat vacated by his brother David Weprin, who, after an unsuccessful run for New York City Comptroller, succeeded him in the Assembly in 2010.

New York State Assembly
Preceded by Martin Rodell	Member of the New York State Assembly from the 21st district 1971–1972	Succeeded by George J. Farrell, Jr.
Preceded by Arthur J. Cooperman	Member of the New York State Assembly from the 24th district 1973–1994	Succeeded by Mark Weprin
Preceded by Arthur J. Kremer	Chairman of the New York State Assembly Ways and Means Committee; 1987–1991	Succeeded by Sheldon Silver
Political offices
Preceded by Mel Miller	Speaker of the New York State Assembly; 1991–1994	Succeeded by Sheldon Silver
