= Brian Sharoff =

American politician (1943–2020)

Member of the New York State Assembly from the 42nd district
- In office January 1, 1971 – December 31, 1976
- Preceded by: Lawrence P. Murphy
- Succeeded by: David P. Greenberg

Personal details
- Born: January 1, 1943 Brooklyn, New York City, New York
- Died: May 23, 2020 (aged 77)
- Party: Democratic

Brian Sharoff (January 1, 1943 – May 23, 2020) was an American politician who served in the New York State Assembly from the 42nd district from 1971 to 1976.

Sharoff received his bachelor's degree from Hunter College in 1964 and his master's degree in international relations from Rutgers University in 1966. He served as president of the Private Label Manufacturers Association.

He died on May 23, 2020, at age 77.
