= Mel Miller (politician) =

American lawyer and politician (1939–2019)

117th Speaker of the New York State Assembly
- In office January 8, 1987 – December 13, 1991
- Governor: Mario Cuomo
- Lieutenant Governor: Stan Lundine
- Preceded by: Stanley Fink
- Succeeded by: Saul Weprin

Member of the New York State Assembly from the 44th district
- In office January 6, 1971 – December 13, 1991
- Preceded by: Sidney A. Lichtman
- Succeeded by: Robert J. Warner

Personal details
- Born: July 24, 1939 Brooklyn, New York, U.S.
- Died: March 8, 2019 (aged 79) New York, New York, U.S.
- Party: Democratic
- Education: Brooklyn College (BA); New York University School of Law (JD)

Melvin Howard Miller (July 24, 1939 – March 8, 2019) was an American lawyer and politician.

== Life ==
Miller was born on July 24, 1939, in Brooklyn, New York. He graduated from Brooklyn College in 1961 and the New York University School of Law in 1964. Following his admission to the New York bar later that year, he became a member of the New York County Lawyers Association. He also taught at the CUNY Graduate Center and at the John Jay College of Criminal Justice.

He was a Democratic member of the New York State Assembly representing Kings County from 1971 to 1991, and sat in the 179th, 180th, 181st, 182nd, 183rd, 184th, 185th, 186th, 187th, 188th and 189th New York State Legislatures. He was Speaker from 1987 to 1991. He was responsible for the Fiscal Reform Act of 1990.

=== Conviction ===
Upon being convicted on 8 out of 19 felony charges in the United States District Court for the Eastern District of New York, he lost the speakership on December 13, 1991 and was replaced by majority leader James R. Tallon as acting speaker until the election of Saul Weprin to the speakership on December 16, 1991.

In the case, which did not involve his work in government, Miller and his Assembly aide and onetime law partner, Jay Adolf, were charged with cheating legal clients out of some of the profits from investments in cooperative apartments. They acknowledged receiving a total of about $250,000 in three deals, but denied defrauding clients. The jury convicted each defendant of six charges of fraud, one of conspiracy and one of using an assumed name, all involving one scheme to secretly buy and resell eight apartments in a Brooklyn building. The jury found that they had deprived their clients of the right to buy the apartments and receive the profits.

Under New York State law, any member of the state legislature convicted of a felony is automatically expelled. Miller immediately lost his seat in the Assembly and position as speaker.

=== Reversal ===
In 1993, Miller's convictions were overturned on appeal.

=== Later career ===
He was widely recognized as an authority on public finance and the state budgetary process, and as one of the founders of Bolton St Johns, he served as senior consultant to the firm.

=== Death ===
He died in Manhattan from lung cancer on March 8, 2019.

== Sources ==
New York State Assembly
Preceded by Sidney A. Lichtman	New York State Assembly; 44th District; 1971–1991	Succeeded by Joni A. Yoswein
Political offices
Preceded by Stanley Fink	Speaker of the New York State Assembly; 1987–1991	Succeeded by Saul Weprin
