= Anthony G. DiFalco =

American politician

Member of the New York State Assembly from the 63rd district
- In office January 1, 1973 – December 31, 1976
- Preceded by: William F. Passannante
- Succeeded by: Sheldon Silver

Member of the New York State Assembly from the 61st district
- In office January 1, 1969 – December 31, 1972
- Preceded by: Jerome W. Marks
- Succeeded by: Edward J. Amann Jr.

Personal details
- Born: July 14, 1938 (age 88) New York City, New York
- Party: Democratic

Anthony G. DiFalco (born July 14, 1938) is an American politician who served in the New York State Assembly from 1969 to 1976.
