= Ronald H. Tills =

American politician (1935–2018)

Member of the New York State Assembly from the 147th district
- In office January 1, 1969 – December 31, 1978
- Preceded by: Dorothy H. Rose
- Succeeded by: Richard L. Kennedy

Personal details
- Born: May 1, 1935 Hamburg, New York, U.S.
- Died: February 4, 2018 (aged 82) West Falls, New York, U.S.
- Party: Republican

Ronald H. Tills (May 1, 1935 – February 4, 2018) was an American politician who served in the New York State Assembly from the 147th district from 1969 to 1978.

In August 2009, he was sentenced to 18 months in prison for transporting prostitutes across state lines. He died on February 4, 2018, in West Falls, New York at age 82.
