= Joseph F. Lisa =

American politician and judge (born 1937)

Justice of the New York Supreme Court
- In office 1996–2001

Judge of the New York City Civil Court
- In office 1992–1996

Member of the New York City Council from the 34th district
- In office January 1, 1983 – December 31, 1991
- Preceded by: District created
- Succeeded by: Victor L. Robles

Member of the New York State Assembly from the 34th district
- In office January 1, 1973 – December 31, 1976
- Preceded by: Rosemary R. Gunning
- Succeeded by: Ivan C. Lafayette

Member of the New York State Assembly from the 31st district
- In office January 1, 1969 – December 31, 1972
- Preceded by: Sidney Lebowitz
- Succeeded by: Alfred A. DelliBovi

Personal details
- Born: January 20, 1937 (age 89) Queens, New York City, New York, U.S.
- Party: Democratic
- Children: 3
- Education: St. John's University (BBA, JD); Brooklyn Law School (LLM)

Military service
- Allegiance: United States
- Branch/service: United States Marine Corps Reserve

Joseph F. Lisa (born January 20, 1937) is an American politician, lawyer, and former judge from New York. He served in the New York State Assembly from 1969 to 1976, in the New York City Council from 1983 to 1991, and as a justice of the New York Supreme Court from 1996 to 2001.

== Early life and education ==
Lisa was born on January 20, 1937, in Queens, New York City. He received his early education in the New York City public schools. He earned a Bachelor of Business Administration from St. John's University in 1958, a Juris Doctor from St. John's School of Law in 1960, and a Master of Laws from Brooklyn Law School in 1967.

He served in the United States Marine Corps Reserve from 1955 to 1961, receiving an honorable discharge.

== Legal career ==
Lisa was admitted to the New York State Bar in 1961. He served as law secretary to Justices William G. Giaccio and J. Irwin Shapiro.

In 1967, he was appointed Acting Chief of the Appeals Bureau of the Queens District Attorney's Office. Later that year, he was elected as a Delegate to the 1967 New York State Constitutional Convention.

== Political career ==
Lisa was elected to the New York State Assembly in 1968, representing the 31st district from 1969 to 1972. He then represented the 34th district from 1973 to 1976. He succeeded Sidney Lebowitz in the 31st district and was succeeded by Alfred A. DelliBovi. In the 34th district, he succeeded Rosemary R. Gunning and was succeeded by Ivan C. Lafayette.

In 1982, Lisa was elected to the New York City Council from the newly created 34th district, serving from 1983 to 1991. He was the first person to represent the district. During his tenure on the Council, he voted in favor of the Homosexual Rights Bill in 1986. In 1991, he chose not to seek re-election to the Council.

== Judicial career ==
In 1992, Lisa was elected to the New York City Civil Court. In 1993, he was appointed an Acting Justice of the New York Supreme Court, a position he held until his election as a full Justice of the Supreme Court in 1996. He served on the Supreme Court until his retirement in 2001.

== Post-judicial career ==
After retiring from the bench, Lisa became Of Counsel to the law firm Finz & Finz, P.C. in Mineola, New York.

He served as an Adjunct Professor of Political Science at the City University of New York from 1993 to 1994. He has lectured and written extensively on the social, legal, and ethical implications of law during epidemics and pandemics. He is a permanent member of the scientific community of the San Marino Scientific Conference in the Republic of San Marino.

== Personal life ==
Lisa is married and has three children.
