= Thomas R. Frey =

American politician

County Executive of Monroe County
- In office January 1, 1988 – December 31, 1991
- Preceded by: Lucien A. Morin
- Succeeded by: Robert L. King

Member of the New York State Assembly from the 132nd district
- In office January 1, 1973 – 1978
- Preceded by: S. William Rosenberg
- Succeeded by: Pinny Cooke

Personal details
- Born: April 3, 1936 Corning, New York
- Died: February 11, 2017 (aged 80) Rochester, New York
- Party: Democratic

Thomas R. Frey (April 3, 1936 – February 11, 2017) was an American politician who served in the New York State Assembly from the 132nd district from 1973 to 1978 and as the County Executive of Monroe County from 1987 to 1991.

== Early life and education ==
Frey grew up in Corning, New York and went to Corning Free Academy. He served in the Marines for two years and then attended Princeton University to study history. After that, he got his law degree from UC Berkeley. In 1964 he got admitted to the State Bar of California.

== Career ==
Thomas R. Frey moved back to New York and joined the Harris, Beach & Wilcox law firm. He served on the Rochester school board and in the New York State Assembly. He worked in the state legislature, and also worked as the director of state operations for Governor Hugh Carey and served on the New York State Board of Regents.

In 1987, he made history as the only Democrat ever elected as Monroe County Executive.

== Death ==
Frey died of pancreatic cancer on February 11, 2017, in Rochester at age 80.
