= Thomas A. Hanna =

American politician (1926–2019)

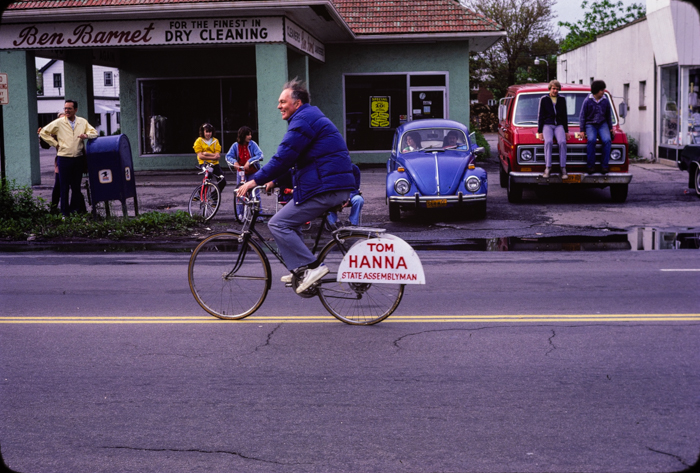
- State Assemblyman Tom Hanna cycling in Irondequoit Memorial Day Parade 1979

Member of the New York State Assembly from the 130th district
- In office January 1, 1973 – December 31, 1984
- Preceded by: Donald C. Shoemaker
- Succeeded by: Louise Slaughter

Personal details
- Born: October 2, 1926 Rochester, New York
- Died: April 26, 2019 (aged 92) Webster, New York
- Party: Republican
- Education: Boston College (BA); Harvard Business School (MBA)

Thomas A. Hanna (October 2, 1926 – April 26, 2019) was an American politician who served in the New York State Assembly from the 130th district from 1973 to 1984.

He died on April 26, 2019, in Webster, New York, at age 92.
