= Edward H. Lehner =

American politician (1933–2026)

Member of the New York State Assembly from the 73 district
- In office January 1, 1973 – December 31, 1980
- Preceded by: John Walsh
- Succeeded by: John Brian Murtaugh

Personal details
- Born: March 6, 1933 New York City, U.S.
- Died: September 9, 2026 (aged 93) New York City, U.S.
- Party: Democratic

Edward Harvey Lehner (March 6, 1933 – September 9, 2026) was an American politician who served in the New York State Assembly from the 73rd district from 1973 to 1980. In 1995's general election, he ran for Supreme Court Justice in Judicial District 1st, against George B. Daniels. Lehner died of cancer in Brooklyn, New York, on September 9, 2026, at the age of 93.
