= Michael L. Pesce =

American politician

Member of the New York State Assembly from the 52nd district
- In office January 1, 1973 – December 31, 1980
- Preceded by: Joseph Martuscello
- Succeeded by: Eileen C. Dugan

Personal details
- Born: March 1, 1943 (age 83) Mola di Bari, Italy
- Party: Democratic

Michael L. Pesce (born March 1, 1943) is an American politician who served in the New York State Assembly from the 52nd district from 1973 to 1980.
