= Gordon W. Burrows =

American politician

Member of the New York State Assembly from the 84th district
- In office January 1, 1983 – December 31, 1988
- Preceded by: Oliver Koppell
- Succeeded by: Cecile D. Singer

Member of the New York State Assembly from the 90th district
- In office January 1, 1967 – December 31, 1982
- Preceded by: Melville E. Abrams
- Succeeded by: Vincent Leibell

Member of the New York State Assembly from the 97th district
- In office January 1, 1966 – December 31, 1966
- Preceded by: Willis H. Stephens
- Succeeded by: District abolished

Personal details
- Born: April 28, 1926 Yonkers, New York, U.S.
- Died: January 10, 1997 (aged 70) Manhattan, New York, U.S.
- Party: Republican

Gordon W. Burrows (April 28, 1926 – January 10, 1997) was an American politician who served in the New York State Assembly from 1966 to 1988.

He died of cardiac arrest on January 10, 1997, in Manhattan, New York City, New York at age 70.
