= Peter S. Dokuchitz =

American politician

Member of the New York State Assembly from the 113th district
- In office November 1973 – December 31, 1978
- Preceded by: Harold C. Luther
- Succeeded by: Anthony J. Casale

Personal details
- Born: March 9, 1928 Oneonta, New York, U.S.
- Died: July 20, 2014 (aged 86) Oneonta, New York, U.S.
- Party: Republican

Peter S. Dokuchitz (March 9, 1928 – July 20, 2014) was an American politician who served in the New York State Assembly from the 113th district from 1973 to 1978.

He died on July 20, 2014, in Oneonta, New York at age 86.
