= Peter G. Mirto =

American politician

Member of the New York State Assembly from the 59th district
- In office January 1, 1973 – December 31, 1978
- Preceded by: Edward J. Amann Jr.
- Succeeded by: Victor L. Robles

Member of the New York State Assembly from the 36th district
- In office November 20, 1969 – December 31, 1972
- Preceded by: Rudolph F. DiBlasi
- Succeeded by: Joseph S. Calabretta

Personal details
- Born: April 13, 1915 Brooklyn, New York City, New York
- Died: March 5, 2001 (aged 85) Glen Cove, New York
- Party: Democratic

Peter G. Mirto (April 13, 1915 – March 5, 2001) was an American politician who served in the New York State Assembly from 1969 to 1978.

He died on March 5, 2001, in Glen Cove, New York at age 85.
