= John G. Lopresto =

American politician

Member of the New York State Assembly from the 35th district
- In office January 1, 1973 – December 31, 1982
- Preceded by: Chester J. Straub
- Succeeded by: Helen M. Marshall

Member of the New York State Assembly from the 32nd district
- In office January 1, 1971 – December 31, 1972
- Preceded by: Jules G. Sabbatino
- Succeeded by: Edward Abramson

Personal details
- Born: July 10, 1940 (age 86) Queens, New York City, New York
- Party: Republican

John G. Lopresto (born July 10, 1940) is an American politician who served in the New York State Assembly from 1971 to 1982.
