= John T. Flack =

American politician

Member of the New York State Assembly from the 33rd district
- In office January 1, 1973 – December 31, 1982
- Preceded by: Joseph S. Calabretta
- Succeeded by: Alton Waldon

Member of the New York State Assembly from the 30th district
- In office January 1, 1969 – December 31, 1972
- Preceded by: Stanley J. Pryor
- Succeeded by: Herbert J. Miller

Personal details
- Born: November 4, 1928 Brooklyn, New York City, New York
- Died: August 19, 2016 (aged 87) Roswell, Georgia
- Party: Republican

John T. Flack (November 4, 1928 – August 19, 2016) was an American politician who served in the New York State Assembly from 1969 to 1982.

He died on August 19, 2016, in Roswell, Georgia at age 87.
