= Jay P. Rolison Jr. =

American politician (1929 – 2007)

Member of the New York State Senate
- In office January 1, 1967 – December 31, 1990
- Preceded by: John D. Calandra
- Succeeded by: Stephen M. Saland
- Constituency: 38th district (1967-1972); 39th district (1973-1982); 41st district (1983-1990)

Personal details
- Born: April 5, 1929 Madison, New Jersey, U.S.
- Died: August 29, 2007 (aged 78) Poughkeepsie, New York, U.S.
- Party: Republican
- Spouse: Barbara C. Hanley
- Children: Robert Rolison, unknown
- Education: Providence College (BA); Fordham University (LLB)

Jay Pardee Rolison Jr. (April 5, 1929 – August 29, 2007) was an American lawyer and politician from New York who served in the New York Senate from 1967 to 1990.

== Life ==
He was born on April 5, 1929, in Madison, Morris County, New Jersey, the son of Jay Pardee Rolison (died 1987) and Margaret (Denman) Rolison (1900–1969). He attended Seton Hall Preparatory School, and graduated B.A. from Providence College. He graduated LL.B. from Fordham Law School in 1954, and then worked for two years in the Judge Advocate General's Office at Fort Gordon. Afterwards he practiced law in Poughkeepsie, New York and entered politics as a Republican. He married Barbara C. Hanley (born 1929), and they had two children.

Rolison was a member of the New York State Senate from 1967 to 1990, sitting in the 177th, 178th, 179th, 180th, 181st, 182nd, 183rd, 184th, 185th, 186th, 187th and 188th New York State Legislatures. He became Assistant Majority Leader in 1985

He died on August 29, 2007, at his home in the Town of Poughkeepsie, Dutchess County, New York.

New York State Senate
Preceded by John D. Calandra	Member of the New York State Senate from the 38th district 1967–1972	Succeeded by Donald R. Ackerson
Preceded by Douglas Hudson	Member of the New York State Senate from the 39th district 1973–1982	Succeeded by Richard E. Schermerhorn
Preceded by Joseph Bruno	Member of the New York State Senate from the 41st district 1983–1990	Succeeded by Stephen M. Saland
