= New York's 46th State Senate district =

American legislative district

Senator
Patricia Fahy; D–Albany
- Registration: 35.5% Democratic; 27.4% Republican; 27.2% No party preference
- Demographics: 84% White; 4% Black; 7% Hispanic; 2% Asian
- Population (2017): 292,635
- Registered voters: 203,947

New York's 46th State Senate district is one of 63 districts in the New York State Senate. It has been represented by Democrat Patricia Fahy since 2025.

District 46 is the newest district in the legislature, having been drawn from pieces of existing Senate districts in 2012, increasing the size of the body from 62 seats to 63.

== Geography ==
District 46 is located in the western Capital District, including all of Montgomery County and parts of Albany and Schenectady. It is dominated by the state capital, Albany.

The district overlaps with New York's 19th and 20th congressional districts, and with the 102nd, 103rd, 104th, 109th, 111th, and 112th districts of the New York State Assembly.

== Recent election results ==
=== 2026 ===
2026 New York State Senate election, District 46
Party	Candidate	Votes	%
Democratic	Patricia Fahy		
Working Families	Patricia Fahy		
Total	Patricia Fahy (incumbent)		
Republican	Martha McHugh		
Conservative	Martha McHugh		
Total	Martha McHugh		
Write-in			
Total votes			

=== 2024 ===
2024 New York State Senate election, District 46
Party	Candidate	Votes	%
Democratic	Patricia Fahy	73,599	
Working Families	Patricia Fahy	8,377	
Total	Patricia Fahy	81,976	55.9
Republican	Ted Danz Jr.	55,275	
Conservative	Ted Danz Jr.	9,326	
Total	Ted Danz Jr.	64,599	44.0
Write-in		155	0.1
Total votes		146,730	100.0
Democratic hold			

=== 2022 ===
2022 New York State Senate election, District 46
Party	Candidate	Votes	%
Democratic	Neil Breslin	57,780	
Working Families	Neil Breslin	6,851	
Total	Neil Breslin	64,631	55.1
Republican	Richard Amedure Jr.	43,777	
Conservative	Richard Amedure Jr.	8,793	
Total	Richard Amedure Jr.	52,570	44.8
Write-in		75	0.1
Total votes		117,276	100.0
Democratic win (new boundaries)			

=== 2020 ===
2020 New York State Senate election, District 46
Party	Candidate	Votes	%
Democratic	Michelle Hinchey	68,167	
Working Families	Michelle Hinchey	9,935	
Total	Michelle Hinchey	78,102	50.6
Republican	Richard Amedure Jr.	64,227	
Conservative	Richard Amedure Jr.	8,738	
Independence	Richard Amedure Jr.	2,069	
Total	Richard Amedure Jr.	75,034	48.6
Green	Robert Alft Jr.	1,280	0.8
Write-in		110	0.1
Total votes		154,526	100.0
Democratic gain from Republican			

=== 2018 ===
2018 New York State Senate election, District 46
Party	Candidate	Votes	%
Republican	George Amedore Jr.	55,703	
Conservative	George Amedore Jr.	9,201	
Independence	George Amedore Jr.	2,818	
Reform	George Amedore Jr.	537	
Total	George Amedore Jr. (incumbent)	68,259	55.8
Democratic	Pat Courtney Strong	48,813	
Working Families	Pat Courtney Strong	3,885	
Women's Equality	Pat Courtney Strong	1,418	
Total	Pat Courtney Strong	54,116	44.2
Write-in		32	0.0
Total votes		122,407	100.0
Republican hold			

=== 2016 ===
2016 New York State Senate election, District 46
Primary election
Party	Candidate	Votes	%
Green	George Amedore Jr. (incumbent)	63	50.5
Green	Sara Niccoli	48	38.4
Green	Marina Karuma-Seales	12	9.6
Green	Maurice Hinchey	1	0.8
Green	Glenn Raymus	1	0.8
Write-in		0	0.0
Total votes		125	100.0
General election
Republican	George Amedore Jr.	67,723	
Conservative	George Amedore Jr.	10,581	
Independence	George Amedore Jr.	4,431	
Green	George Amedore Jr.	1,499	
Reform	George Amedore Jr.	482	
Total	George Amedore Jr. (incumbent)	84,716	62.8
Democratic	Sara Niccoli	44,192	
Working Families	Sara Niccoli	4,597	
Women's Equality	Sara Niccoli	1,282	
Total	Sara Niccoli	50,071	37.1
Write-in		60	0.1
Total votes		134,847	100.0
Republican hold			

=== 2014 ===
2014 New York State Senate election, District 46
Primary election
Party	Candidate	Votes	%
Green	Cecilia Tkaczyk (incumbent)	66	91.7
Write-in		8	8.3
Total votes		72	100.0
General election
Republican	George Amedore Jr.	40,628	
Conservative	George Amedore Jr.	9,267	
Independence	George Amedore Jr.	2,804	
Stop Common Core	George Amedore Jr.	854	
Total	George Amedore Jr.	53,553	56.0
Democratic	Cecilia Tkaczyk	34,153	
Working Families	Cecilia Tkaczyk	5,036	
Green	Cecilia Tkaczyk	2,820	
Total	Cecilia Tkaczyk (incumbent)	42,009	43.9
Write-in		108	0.1
Total votes		95,670	100.0
Republican gain from Democratic			

=== 2012 ===
2012 New York State Senate election, District 46
Primary election
Party	Candidate	Votes	%
Democratic	Cecilia Tkaczyk	3,392	51.7
Democratic	Thomas Dolan	2,202	33.6
Democratic	Monica Arias Miranda	961	14.7
Write-in		0	8.3
Total votes		6,555	100.0
Green	Cecilia Tkaczyk	23	53.5
Green	Thomas Dolan	10	23.2
Green	Monica Arias Miranda	9	20.9
Green	Neill Hammond	1	2.3
Write-in		0	0.0
Total votes		43	100.0
General election
Democratic	Cecilia Tkaczyk	55,498	
Working Families	Cecilia Tkaczyk	5,823	
Green	Cecilia Tkaczyk	1,892	
Total	Cecilia Tkaczyk	63,213	49.985
Republican	George Amedore Jr.	51,312	
Conservative	George Amedore Jr.	8,286	
Independence	George Amedore Jr.	3,597	
Total	George Amedore Jr.	63,195	49.970
Write-in		57	0.1
Total votes		126,465	100.0
Democratic win (new boundaries)			

=== Federal results in District 46 ===
Year	Office	Results
2020	President	Biden 51.1 – 46.6%
2016	President	Trump 49.4 – 45.2%
2012	President	Obama 53.6 – 44.3%
2012	Senate	Gillibrand 67.8 – 30.5%
