= Richard E. Schermerhorn =

American politician

Member of the New York State Senate
- In office January 1, 1971 – December 31, 1988
- Preceded by: D. Clinton Dominick III
- Succeeded by: E. Arthur Gray
- Constituency: 37th district (1971-1972); 40th district (1973-1982); 39th district (1983-1988)

Personal details
- Born: October 29, 1927 Albany, New York, U.S.
- Died: June 21, 1995 (aged 67) Newburgh, New York, U.S.
- Party: Republican
- Spouse: Connie Edwards
- Children: 4
- Education: Ravena-Coeymans-Selkirk High School; Albany Military Academy
- Alma mater: Bryant University

Military service
- Allegiance: United States
- Branch/service: United States Army
- Battles/wars: World War II

Richard Edward Schermerhorn (October 29, 1927 – June 21, 1995) was an American politician from New York. A vocal anti-abortionist, Schermerhorn served in the New York State Senate from 1971 to 1988.

In 1987, Schermerhorn was accused of taking a mafia bribe, which was downgraded to an undeclared campaign contribution. In 1988, he was indicted for fraud, tax evasion, and obstruction of justice, and subsequently lost his bid for reelection. In 1989, Schermerhorn was acquitted on the fraud charges, but was convicted of tax evasion and sentenced to a year and a half in jail and two years' probation. Schermerhorn was released in 1991.

After serving his prison term, Schermerhorn became a lobbyist in the state capital of Albany.

== Life ==
Schermerhorn was born on October 29, 1927, in Albany, New York. He was sent to a foster home when he was 3 months old, and later stated that, if abortion had been legal at the time, he might never have been born. He attended Ravena-Coeymans-Selkirk High School and Albany Military Academy and graduated with an M.B.A. from Bryant University.

== Career ==
During World War II, Schermerhorn served in the U.S. Army. He then went into the insurance business, and entered politics as Republican.

In June 1970, he defeated the incumbent State Senator D. Clinton Dominick III in the Republican primary. Dominick had voted for the 1970 abortion law, and Schermerhorn was a conservative anti-abortionist, who opposed abortion in all circumstances. Throughout his career, he was vocal about abortion and adoption.

He was a member of the New York State Senate from 1971 to 1988, sitting in the 179th, 180th, 181st, 182nd, 183rd, 184th, 185th, 186th and 187th New York State Legislatures.

=== Indictment and conviction ===
On July 29, 1987, federal prosecutors accused Schermerhorn of having taken a bribe in 1984 from Dominick Lofaro, an ex-mafioso-turned-informer. The facts were then re-evaluated, and the bribe became a campaign contributions from Lofaro which had not been listed by Schermerhorn in his election campaign financial statement. Therefore, on September 23, 1988, he was indicted by a federal grand jury for fraud. On November 2, 1988, he was also indicted for tax evasion. and obstruction of justice. In 1985, he had sold his interest in a hotel, and did not report the capital gain in his tax statement. On November 8, 1988, he was defeated for re-election by Democrat E. Arthur Gray.

Schermerhorn went to trial in the United States District Court for the Southern District of New York. On October 26, 1989, Schermerhorn was acquitted on the fraud charges, but was convicted of tax evasion. On December 15, 1989, he was sentenced by Judge Gerard Goettel to a year and a half in jail, and afterwards two years' probation. On July 2, 1991, Schermerhorn was released from Federal Prison Camp, Montgomery, and transferred to the Brooklyn Community Corrections Center.

After serving his prison term, Schermerhorn became a lobbyist in Albany.

== Personal life ==
Schermerhorn married Connie Edwards, and they had four daughters.

Schermerhorn died on June 21, 1995, at his home in Newburgh, New York, of throat cancer; and was buried at the Calvary Cemetery in New Windsor.

New York State Senate
Preceded by D. Clinton Dominick III	New York State Senate; 37th District; 1971–1972	Succeeded by Bernard G. Gordon
Preceded by Walter B. Langley	New York State Senate; 40th District; 1973–1982	Succeeded by Charles D. Cook
Preceded by Jay P. Rolison, Jr.	New York State Senate; 39th District; 1983–1988	Succeeded by E. Arthur Gray
