= Lisa Kaul =

American politician

Member-elect of the New York Senate from the 39th district
- Assuming office January 2027
- Succeeding: Robert Rolison

Personal details
- Party: Democratic

Lisa Kaul is an American politician. She is the Democratic member-elect of the New York State Senate from the 39th district, defeating Robert Rolison. Prior to her victory, she was an administrator at Vassar College and a member of the Dutchess County Legislature.

== Early life and career ==
Kaul was born in India; she frequently moved as part of her father's army duties, which she said influenced her outlook on school, saying it was about being "always involved in politics, making sure I created a ruckus and that students' needs were heard". After completing her BA at Delhi University, she went to the University of Oxford as a Rhodes Scholar, obtaining a PhD in Social and Cultural Anthropology; her doctoral dissertation was Reclaiming the nation through land: Jewish religious nationalism in Israel. She worked at Vassar College as Director of the Office of Community-Engaged Learning from 2017 to 2021.

Kaul has credited the fight against climate change as her inspiration for entering politics. She joined a local parent–teacher association, where she helped stop a local elementary school from closing, which would have moved students to a further location. She was elected to the Arlington Central School District Board of Education in 2011. She co-organized the Poughkeepsie Women's March Across the Hudson the day after Trump was inaugurated in January 2017. In 2023, she was elected to District 6 in the Dutchess County Legislature.

Kaul ran in the 2026 New York State Senate election for the 39th district, held at the time by Republican Robert Rolison. Although the district had a Democratic lean in 2022 redistricting, the party lost in both cases by small margins. She won the primary in June 2026, beating two other opponents. During the campaign, she cited affordability as a major issue in the district. She later won the general election, unseating Rolison.

== Personal life ==
Kaul is married to Jeff Seidman. After emigrating to the United States in 2004, she became a naturalized citizen in 2008.
