= E. Arthur Gray =

American politician (1925–2007)

Member of the New York State Senate from the 39th district
- In office January 1, 1989 – December 31, 1990
- Preceded by: Dick Schermerhorn
- Succeeded by: Bill Larkin

Mayor of Port Jervis, New York
- In office 1978–1988
- Succeeded by: Dick Roberts

Personal details
- Born: Edward Arthur Gray; February 28, 1925 Port Jervis, New York, U.S.
- Died: April 10, 2007 (aged 82) Port Jervis, New York, U.S.
- Party: Democratic
- Spouse: Helen Hart
- Education: University of Colorado

Military service
- Allegiance: United States
- Branch/service: United States Naval Reserve
- Rank: Lieutenant (junior grade)
- Battles/wars: World War II

Edward Arthur Gray (February 28, 1925 – April 10, 2007) was an American politician from New York. A member of the Democratic Party, Gray was elected to the New York State Senate in 1988, defeating Republican incumbent Dick Schermerhorn. He served one term before losing reelection to Bill Larkin. Gray previously held office as the longest-serving mayor of his home town of Port Jervis, New York. The town's post office building, which is listed on the National Register of Historic Places, was named after him in 2008.

== Early life ==
Edward Arthur Gray was born on February 28, 1925, in Port Jervis, New York to his parents Arthur A. Grey and Elizabeth Brown Gray. He grew up in Port Jervis, graduating from Port Jervis High School in 1943. Gray served in the military as junior grade Lieutenant in the United States Naval Reserve during World War II.

== Political career ==
Gray entered politics when he was elected as the Mayor of Port Jervis, taking office in 1978. He served five full terms as the mayor, and was elected to a sixth, but resigned the mayorship in 1988 after he was elected to the New York State Senate for the 39th district. He was elected as a Democrat, defeating the incumbent Republican Dick Schermerhorn, who had served as state senator for 16 years. Gray was sworn in on January 1, 1989, serving one full term in the State Senate. He ran for re-election in the 1990 New York State Senate Election but lost to Assemblyman Bill Larkin.

== Personal life ==
He married Helen A. Gray in 1949 and the couple had 2 kids together. He died on April 10, 2007, in Port Jervis, being survived by his wife and his two children.

New York State Senate
Preceded by Dick Schermerhorn	New York State Senate; 39th District; 1988–1991	Succeeded by Bill Larkin
