= Chris Eachus =

American politician

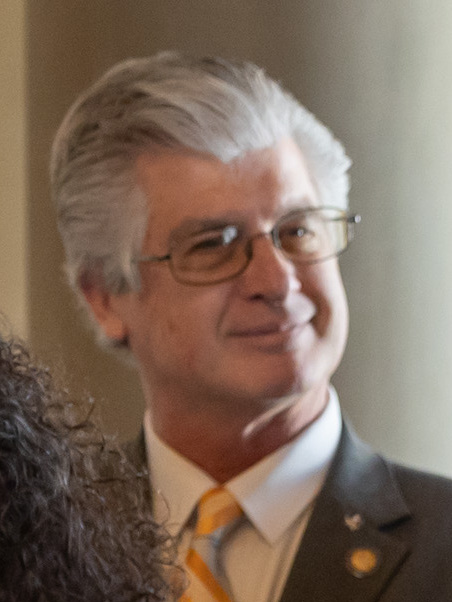

Member of the New York State Assembly from the 99th district
- Incumbent
- Assumed office January 1, 2023
- Preceded by: Colin Schmitt

Personal details
- Born: October 8, 1955 (age 70) San Mateo, California, U.S.
- Party: Democratic
- Education: State University of New York at Cortland (BS); State University of New York at New Paltz (MS)

Christopher W. Eachus (born October 8, 1955) is an American politician serving as a member of the New York State Assembly from the 99th district, which covers parts of Orange and Rockland Counties. Eachus is a member of the Democratic Party.

== Early life and education ==
Born in San Mateo California, Eachus spent his early years in Peru until his family settled on Long Island. As a boy he was a member of the Boy Scouts and ended up becoming an Eagle Scout his Junior year of high school. He graduated with a master's degree from SUNY New Paltz. He made a career as a high school teacher for 40 years.

== Political career ==
Eachus served 12 years (3 terms) as a member of the Orange County Legislature, representing the 15th district from 2006-2018. He ran for New York State Senate twice against long-time incumbent William J. Larkin Jr., losing in 2012 and 2016.

=== New York State Assembly ===
Eachus declared his candidacy for New York State Assembly in early 2022. With incumbent Assemblyman Colin Schmitt running for Congress, the 99th Assembly district seat became open. Fellow Democratic candidate Zak Constantine withdrew from the race following Eachus's entry. Eachus defeated Republican Kathryn Luciani, a Town Councilwoman from Woodbury, by 8 votes after a recount.

Eachus was the only Democrat to flip a previously Republican Assembly seat in 2022, and represents the second most pro-Trump district of any Assembly Democrat (behind only Simcha Eichenstein), with Donald Trump winning the newly-drawn 99th Assembly district 55% to 45% over Joe Biden in the 2020 presidential election. Republican Lee Zeldin also carried the district by nearly nine points over Democrat Kathy Hochul in the 2022 New York gubernatorial election. Chris Eachus was the second most successful freshman Assemblymember in the 2023 session, having passed seven bills (Assemblymember Dana Levenberg passed nine).

In 2024, Eachus easily won re-election by more than 13% over Republican challenger Tom Lapolla, even as Donald Trump carried the district again, this time by 20%.

He serves on the Aging, Higher Education, Mental Health, Transportation, and Veterans' Affairs committees in the Assembly.

== Electoral history ==
=== Orange County Legislature ===
Orange County's 15th Legislative District 2005 General Election
Party	Candidate	Votes	%
Democratic	Christopher Eachus	1,503	46.37
Working Families	Christopher Eachus	131	4.04%
Total	Christopher Eachus	1,634	50.42%
Republican	Christina M. Longinott	1,274	39.31%
Conservative	Christina M. Longinott	333	10.27%
Total	Christine M. Longinott	1,607	49.58%
Total votes		3,241	100%
Democratic gain from Republican			

Orange County's 15th Legislative District 2009 General Election
Party	Candidate	Votes	%
Democratic	Christopher W. Eachus	1,021	44.35
Independence	Christopher W. Eachus	165	7.17%
Total	Christopher W. Eachus (incumbent)	1,186	51.52%
Republican	K. James Dittbrenner	949	41.23%
Conservative	K. James Dittbrenner	167	7.25%
Total	K. James Dittbrenner	1,116	48.48%
Total votes		2,302	100%
Democratic hold			

Orange County's 15th Legislative District 2013 General Election
Party	Candidate	Votes	%
Democratic	Christopher W. Eachus	1,685	50.69%
Working Families	Christopher W. Eachus	113	3.40%
Independence	Christopher W. Eachus	112	3.37%
Total	Christopher W. Eachus (incumbent)	1,910	57.46%
Republican	Veronica A. McMillan	1,180	35.50%
Conservative	Veronica A. McMillan	234	7.04%
Total	Veronica A. McMillan	1,414	42.54%
Total votes		3,324	100%
Democratic hold			

=== New York State Senate ===
New York's 39th Senate District 2012 General Election
Party	Candidate	Votes	%
Republican	William J. Larkin, Jr.	45,942	43.87%
Conservative	William J. Larkin, Jr.	6,722	6.42%
Independence	William J. Larkin, Jr.	2,257	2.16%
Total	William J. Larkin, Jr. (incumbent)	54,921	52.45%
Democratic	Christopher W. Eachus	46,126	44.05
Working Families	Christopher W. Eachus	3,620	3.46%
Total	Christopher W. Eachus	49,746	47.51%
Write-in		50	0.05%
Total votes		104,717	100%
Republican hold			

New York's 39th Senate District 2016 General Election
Party	Candidate	Votes	%
Republican	William J. Larkin, Jr.	51,010	45.25%
Conservative	William J. Larkin, Jr.	6,914	6.13%
Independence	William J. Larkin, Jr.	6,611	5.86%
Reform	William J. Larkin, Jr.	496	0.44%
Total	William J. Larkin, Jr. (incumbent)	65,031	57.69%
Democratic	Christopher W. Eachus	43,915	38.96%
Working Families	Christopher W. Eachus	2,882	2.56%
Women's Equality	Christopher W. Eachus	844	0.75%
Total	Christopher W. Eachus	47,641	42.26%
Write-in		49	0.04%
Total votes		112,721	100%
Republican hold			

=== New York State Assembly ===
New York's 99th Assembly District 2022 General Election
Party	Candidate	Votes	%
Democratic	Christopher W. Eachus	18,539	50.00%
Republican	Kathryn D. Luciani	16,614	44.81%
Conservative	Kathryn D. Luciani	1,917	5.17%
Total	Kathryn D. Luciani	18,531	49.98%
Write-in		10	0.03%
Total votes		37,080	100%
Democratic gain from Republican			

New York's 99th Assembly District 2024 General Election
Party	Candidate	Votes	%
Democratic	Christopher W. Eachus	27,001	53.94%
Working Families	Christopher W. Eachus	1,345	2.69%
Total	Christopher W. Eachus (incumbent)	28,346	56.63%
Republican	Tom Lapolla	19,516	38.99%
Conservative	Tom Lapolla	2,167	4.33%
Total	Tom Lapolla	21,683	43.32%
Write-in		26	0.05%
Total votes		50,055	100%
Democratic hold			
