= Colin Schmitt =

American politician (born 1990)

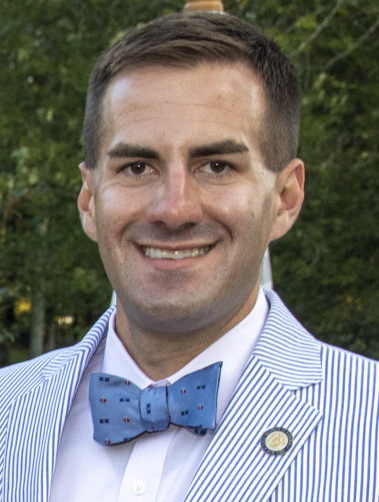

Member of the New York State Assembly from the 99th district
- In office January 9, 2019 – December 31, 2022
- Preceded by: James Skoufis
- Succeeded by: Chris Eachus

Personal details
- Born: June 20, 1990 (age 36) New York City, New York, U.S.
- Party: Republican
- Spouse: Nikki Pagano (m. 2018)
- Children: 2
- Education: Catholic University (BA)

Military service
- Allegiance: United States
- Branch/service: United States Army
- Rank: Sergeant
- Unit: New York Army National Guard • 1569th Transportation Company

Colin J. Schmitt (born June 20, 1990) is an American businessman and politician who served two terms as a member of the New York State Assembly from the 99th district, which covers parts of Orange and Rockland Counties. He is a member of the Republican Party.

He ran for New York's 18th congressional district in the 2022 midterms, losing to incumbent Democrat Pat Ryan.

== Early life and education ==
Schmitt was born on Staten Island and raised in Orange County, New York. He graduated from Valley Central High School in Montgomery, New York.

He earned a Bachelor of Arts degree in politics with minors in theology and religious studies from the Catholic University of America.

== Career ==
He started his political career in the office of then-Assemblywoman Ann Rabbitt. After graduating from the Catholic University of America in 2012, Schmitt joined the staff of State Senator Greg Ball, and later worked as the chief of staff for the town supervisor of New Windsor.

Schmitt is also a commercial real estate agent and a Sergeant in the Army National Guard.

=== New York State Assembly ===
Schmitt first ran for office in 2012, campaigning for the Assembly's 99th district. He lost in the primary to Goshen Mayor Kyle Roddey, who in turn lost in the general election to Democrat James Skoufis.

Schmitt ran for the same seat again in 2016. He won the primary uncontested but lost to Skoufis in the general election, 53% to 47%.

In 2018, after Skoufis had declared his campaign for the 39th district of the State Senate, Schmitt announced he would run for the 99th district for a third time. He defeated Democrat Matthew Rettig with 53% of the vote, and was sworn into the Assembly on January 9, 2019.

In 2020, Schmitt defeated Democratic challenger Sarita Bhandarkar to hold his seat winning all ten towns of that district that year.

Over the course of his four years in the NY Assembly, Schmitt passed 9 prime sponsored bills through the chamber and co-sponsored over 75 other's that passed the Assembly. Several of his bills that did not become law were more controversial, including an attempted ban on Critical Race Theory and classroom lessons that made students feel discomfort about racism, and a prohibition on mask guidance or mandates from New York state.

=== 2022 congressional election ===
Following the 2020 election, Schmitt announced his candidacy for New York's 18th congressional district in the 2022 election. Schmitt was defeated in the general election by incumbent Democrat Pat Ryan in a close race. Schmitt was supported by local and national small business groups including NFIB. In addition to advocating for small businesses, Schmitt campaigned on support for police, tighter border security and tackling the fentanyl crisis.

=== Association with January 6 ===
Prior to announcing his run for Congress, Schmitt delivered send-off remarks to members of the Orange County Right to Life non-profit before they headed to the Washington, DC on January 6, 2021. The disclosure of this news resulted in immediate calls for Schmitt's resignation, which he resisted. Schmitt was not present in Washington, D.C. on January 6, 2021.

=== Veteran's status controversy ===
Following Election Day, numerous media outlets reported on the attempt by a firm connected to the DCCC to illegally access the military records of Republican elected officials and candidates for congress. Schmitt was one of the Republican candidates targeted by opposition research groups attempting to illegally access private military records. During the campaign some of Schmitt's records were used in a report by the Intercept questioning the use of the term "veteran" to describe Schmitt by certain political supporters.

== Career after State Legislature ==
Schmitt was appointed by Clarkstown (NY) Supervisor George Hoehmann to be the new Director of Finance for the Hudson Valley municipality in March 2023. This position, which serves at the pleasure of the Town Supervisor, still garnered opposition from the sole Democrat on the Town Board, Patrick Carroll who stated "Supervisor Hoehmann made representations that Schmitt was qualified and experienced for a financial job...this type of job shouldn't be a patronage job. The hardworking taxpayers deserve better for a steward of their money." Schmitt previously served on the local governments committee in the State Legislature and represented parts of Rockland County.

=== 2023 New Windsor Supervisor election ===
In April 2023, Schmitt announced he would run for New Windsor Town Supervisor, setting up a primary against fellow Republican Steve Bedetti (a town councilman). Schmitt held a narrow three-vote lead over Bedetti following election night. Still, after counting all absentee and affidavit ballots, Bedetti was declared the winner of the Republican primary by a five-vote margin (765 to 760). Schmitt was the Conservative Party general election nominee.

=== New York Army National Guard ===
Schmitt is an active member of the Army National Guard, currently serving for over nine years. At the onset of COVID-19, Schmitt was activated with his unit, 1569th Transportation Company, for the COVID-19 Relief Mission to distribute PPE throughout the state. Between Christmas and New Year 2022, Schmitt was activated for the Buffalo Blizzard Mission.

== Personal life ==
Schmitt lives with his wife, Nikki Pagano-Schmitt, and their two daughters in New Windsor, New York.
