= New York's 41st State Senate district =

American legislative district

Senator
Michelle Hinchey; D–Saugerties
- Registration: 36.9% Democratic; 28.0% Republican; 26.6% No party preference
- Demographics: 73% White; 9% Black; 12% Hispanic; 4% Asian
- Population (2017): 307,790
- Registered voters: 208,911

New York's 41st State Senate district is one of 63 districts in the New York State Senate. It has been represented by Democrat Michelle Hinchey since 2023, following her defeat of incumbent Republican Sue Serino.

== Geography ==
District 41 is located in the Hudson Valley, incorporating almost all of Dutchess County, including the city and town of Poughkeepsie, and the western half of Putnam County.

The district overlaps with New York's 18th and 19th congressional districts, and with the 94th, 95th, 103rd, 104th, 105th, and 106th districts of the New York State Assembly.

== Recent election results ==
=== 2026 ===
2026 New York State Senate election, District 41
Party	Candidate	Votes	%
Democratic	Michelle Hinchey		
Working Families	Michelle Hinchey		
Total	Michelle Hinchey (incumbent)		
Republican	Patrick Sheehan		
Conservative	Patrick Sheehan		
Total	Patrick Sheehan		
Write-in			
Total votes			

=== 2024 ===
2024 New York State Senate election, District 41
Party	Candidate	Votes	%
Democratic	Michelle Hinchey	88,604	
Working Families	Michelle Hinchey	13,550	
Total	Michelle Hinchey (incumbent)	102,154	58.6
Republican	Patrick Sheehan	62,725	
Conservative	Patrick Sheehan	9,297	
Total	Patrick Sheehan	72,022	41.3
Write-in		84	0.1
Total votes		174,260	100.0
Democratic hold			

=== 2022 (redistricting) ===
2022 New York State Senate election, District 41
Party	Candidate	Votes	%
Democratic	Michelle Hinchey	64,692	
Working Families	Michelle Hinchey	9,681	
Total	Michelle Hinchey (incumbent)	74,373	52.7
Republican	Sue Serino	56,755	
Conservative	Sue Serino	8,962	
Independence	Sue Serino	1,018	
Total	Sue Serino (incumbent)	66,735	47.3
Write-in		33	0.0
Total votes		141,141	100.0
Democratic win (new boundaries)			

=== 2020 ===
2020 New York State Senate election, District 41
Party	Candidate	Votes	%
Republican	Sue Serino	69,462	
Conservative	Sue Serino	9,021	
Independence	Sue Serino	2,142	
Rebuild Our State	Sue Serino	455	
Total	Sue Serino (incumbent)	81,080	52.5
Democratic	Karen Smythe	66,922	
Working Families	Karen Smythe	6,158	
SAM	Karen Smythe	455	
Total	Karen Smythe	73,288	47.5
Write-in		18	0.0
Total votes		154,386	100.0
Republican hold			

=== 2018 ===
2018 New York State Senate election, District 41
Party	Candidate	Votes	%
Republican	Sue Serino	49,685	
Conservative	Sue Serino	7,683	
Independence	Sue Serino	1,698	
Reform	Sue Serino	368	
Total	Sue Serino (incumbent)	59,434	50.3
Democratic	Karen Smythe	55,582	
Working Families	Karen Smythe	2,274	
Women's Equality	Karen Smythe	890	
Total	Karen Smythe	58,746	49.7
Write-in		31	0.0
Total votes		118,211	100.0
Republican hold			

=== 2016 ===
2016 New York State Senate election, District 41
Primary election
Party	Candidate	Votes	%
Green	Terry Gipson	47	81.0
Green	Kevin McCarthy	11	19.0
Write-in		0	0.0
Total votes		58	100.0
General election
Republican	Sue Serino	60,088	
Conservative	Sue Serino	9,001	
Independence	Sue Serino	3,354	
Reform	Sue Serino	499	
Total	Sue Serino (incumbent)	72,942	55.4
Democratic	Terry Gipson	52,719	
Working Families	Terry Gipson	3,561	
Green	Terry Gipson	1,534	
Women's Equality	Terry Gipson	802	
Total	Terry Gipson	58,616	44.6
Write-in		53	0.0
Total votes		131,611	100.0
Republican hold			

=== 2014 ===
2014 New York State Senate election, District 41
Primary election
Party	Candidate	Votes	%
Green	Terry Gipson (incumbent)	49	100.0
Write-in		0	0.0
Total votes		49	100.0
General election
Republican	Sue Serino	32,363	
Conservative	Sue Serino	7,811	
Independence	Sue Serino	2,093	
Total	Sue Serino	42,267	52.2
Democratic	Terry Gipson	33,154	
Working Families	Terry Gipson	3,594	
Green	Terry Gipson	1,640	
Tax Relief Now	Terry Gipson	237	
Total	Terry Gipson (incumbent)	38,625	47.7
Write-in		74	0.1
Total votes		80,986	100.0
Republican gain from Democratic			

=== 2012 ===
2012 New York State Senate election, District 41
Primary election
Party	Candidate	Votes	%
Republican	Stephen Saland (incumbent)	5,288	50.5
Republican	Neil DiCarlo	5,181	49.5
Write-in		0	0.0
Total votes		10,469	100.0
Conservative	Neil DiCarlo	297	79.6
Conservative	Stephen Saland (incumbent)	76	20.4
Write-in		0	0.0
Total votes		373	100.0
General election
Democratic	Terry Gipson	48,314	
Working Families	Terry Gipson	5,248	
Total	Terry Gipson	53,562	43.8
Republican	Stephen Saland	47,162	
Independence	Stephen Saland	4,304	
Total	Stephen Saland (incumbent)	51,466	42.1
Conservative	Neil DiCarlo	17,300	14.1
Write-in		37	0.0
Total votes		122,365	100.0
Democratic gain from Republican			

=== Federal results in District 41 ===
Year	Office	Results
2020	President	Biden 54.4 – 43.8%
2016	President	Clinton 48.5 – 47.2%
2012	President	Obama 53.3 – 45.0%
2012	Senate	Gillibrand 66.1 – 32.3%
