= New York's 99th State Assembly district =

American legislative district

Assemblymember
Chris Eachus; D–New Windsor

New York State Assembly, District 99 is located in the southern part of the State of New York in the United States. District 99 is north of New York City and is composed of parts of Orange and Rockland Counties. It is encompassed by New York's 40th State Senate district and New York's 42nd State Senate district, as well as New York's 17th congressional district and New York's 18th congressional district since redistricting in 2022.

District 99 is currently represented by Democrat Chris Eachus. Details about the makeup of the 99th District starting with the 2012 Election cycle through the 2020 Election cycle are listed below.

== Geography ==
=== 2020s ===
The 99th Assembly district includes portions of Rockland County and Orange County, including the towns of Stony Point, Woodbury, Highlands, Cornwall, New Windsor, and Palm Tree, as well as portions of Monroe.

=== 2010s ===
In the 2010s, the 99th Assembly district included portions of Rockland County and Orange County, including the towns of Stony Point, Woodbury, Highlands, Cornwall, New Windsor, Blooming Grove, Hamptonburgh, Chester, Goshen, and Wawyanda

== Representatives ==
Representative	Party	Years	Note
George E. Van Cott	Republican	1966	redistricted from Westchester County, 3rd District; redistricted to 88th District
Kenneth L. Wilson	Republican	1967–1968	redistricted from 109th District
H. Clark Bell	Republican	1969–1972	redistricted to 101st District
Emeel S. Betros	Republican	1973–1980	redistricted from 98th District
Stephen Saland	Republican	1981–1982	redistricted to 97th District
Glenn E. Warren	Republican	1983–1994	redistricted from 100th District
Patrick R. Manning	Republican	1995–2002	redistricted to 103rd District
Willis Stephens	Republican	2003–2006	redistricted from 91st District
Greg Ball	Republican	2007–2010	
Steve Katz	Republican	2011–2012	redistricted to 94th District
James Skoufis	Democrat	2013–2018	redistricted from 96th District
Colin Schmitt	Republican	2018–2022	
Chris Eachus	Democrat	Since 2023	

== 2012 election ==
In 2012, there are four challengers for the open seat for the new 99th Assembly District. This seat became an open seat after the retirement of the incumbent, Nancy Calhoun, of the former the 96th Assembly District. As of July 24, 2012, there will be a Republican Party primary election on September 13, 2012, with Kyle Roddey and Colin Schmitt both being on the ballot. Also as of July 24, 2012, although Democrat James Skoufis has filed enough petitions for an Independence Party Primary challenge to Republican Kyle Roddey, there will be no Independence Party Primary based on the decision of the statewide Independence Party Committee due to their endorsement to only non-party candidate Kyle Roddey.

=== Republican Primary Candidates ===
- Kyle Roddey
- Colin Schmitt
- Mark J Levy (as an announced Write-In candidate)

=== Republican Primary Candidates ===
- Kyle Roddey
- Colin Schmitt (opportunity to ballot)

=== Independence Primary Candidates ===
- Kyle Roddey

=== Working Families Primary Candidates ===
- James Skoufis

=== Candidate Information ===
Kyle Roddey: A native of Goshen, New York, at 26 years of age Kyle Roddey announced that he will be running for State Assembly as a Republican in 2012, Mr Roddey was elected as a Democrat to Village Trustee in Goshen in 2009 and then Mayor of Goshen in 2011, Orange County. He is also running on the Independence Party ballot line and the Conservative Party ballot line for the General Election. His campaign commits to ethics reform, protection of citizen's 2nd Amendment Rights, property tax relief, and deregulation of business.

Colin Schmitt: Growing up in Montgomery, New York, 21-year-old Republican Kyle Roddey relocated his place of residency to New Windsor. He is well known for his political campaign which promises to stop the "Double Dip" loophole that many older New York politicians take advantage of, to collect both their pension and full salary simultaneously.

Mark J. Levy: Republican 53-year-old Mark J. Levy, from Salisbury Mills in the town of Blooming Grove, New York. Having lived in Orange County for over 40 years, raising four children in the process, Levy claims to have the experience that the other candidates lack while being a private citizen instead of "running the same old 'career politician' playbook". Levy says that he will fight for the people of this district against the wasteful and money hungry politicians currently in office.

=== Democratic Candidates ===
James Skoufis: A Member of the town council of Woodbury, New York, 24-year-old James Skoufis claims to fight for the little man, and believes in social equality. His campaign fights for a strong voice in Albany while insisting on tax reform and local job creation. He unsuccessfully sought the Independence Party ballot line, and has already obtained the Democrat and Working Families Party ballot lines for the General Election.

== 2008 election ==
While no challenger has officially filed to take on the district's freshman incumbent legislator, several names have emerged in the media as potential challengers contemplating a bid.

=== Republican candidate ===
Greg Ball: On March 17, 2008, Ball announced that he would be a candidate for reelection during an event at an Irish restaurant in Yorktown Heights, flanked by new Westchester GOP Chairman Douglas Colety, Putnam GOP Chairman Anthony Scannapieco, Jr., and Westchester County Executive candidate Rob Astorino. Ball highlighted the fact that his campaign had received the most money and more contributions from individual donors than any other incumbent minority Assemblyman in the last quarter of 2007. In a speech to supporters, Ball stated that "I'm a maverick Republican. I came into this business from outside the political machine. That makes me a target for Albany insiders."

=== Candidates ===
John A. Degnan, former mayor of the village of Brewster, New York, stated he was in the race in May 2008. He has been endorsed by the Southeast Republican Committee (unanimously), and won the Putnam County Republican Committee's backing by a vote of 97–50. The Westchester Republican Committee narrowly endorsed Ball over Degnan, while the Pawling Republican Committee—the only Dutchess GOP committee in the 99th Assembly District—chose not to endorse either candidate. Though a lifelong Republican, Degnan was also subsequently backed by the Putnam County Democratic Party Committees, and leading Democrats in Westchester County.".

=== Former candidates ===
Although no challenger has officially filed to run against the freshman incumbent Greg Ball, there had been speculation in the media that County Legislator Mike Kaplowitz, who failed in a 2006 bid for State Senate, will be challenging Ball. In April 2008, Kaplowitz ruled out challenging Ball. 2006 challenger Ken Harper is also said to be mulling a second run at the office.

== 2006 election ==
The 2006 New York State Assembly election for New York's 99th District matched conservative Republican Greg Ball and Democrat Ken Harper against the Conservative and Independence Party incumbent Will Stephens. The Democratic Party of New York had targeted the seat as a potential pickup after the incumbent was defeated by a wide margin in the primary by a strong, well-funded challenger.

On September 12, 2006, in the Republican Primary for New York's 99th District, Ball defeated Stephens in a landslide with 70.4% (5,165 votes) to 29.6% (2,176 votes) for Stephens, the lowest vote total for any incumbent running for reelection to the State Assembly that day.

Despite Willis Stephens name remaining on the ballot, Ball went on to win a plurality of votes in the general election on November 6, 2006. His upset victory earned him the title of "Newsmaker of the Year" from one local publication and he also shared a front-page cover The Journal News with fellow upset winner John Hall the day after election day.

=== The Republican primary ===
The primary campaign was a bitter one, with Ball railing against the 'machine politics' of Willis Stephens and Putnam County. The Ball campaign out raised Stephens by a significant margin, giving him a visible presence in local newspapers and television outlets. According to the last filings prior to the primary, Stephens had $13,198.38 on-hand, while Ball had $86,117.03 of the money he has raised remaining. Stephens drew criticism for not returning campaign contributions from the Victory Fund-a political action committee that took contributions from indicted trash magnate James Galante.

On September 12, 2006, in the Republican Primary for New York's 99th Assembly District, challenger Greg Ball, defeated the incumbent Willis Stephens, by a mammoth margin: 71% for Ball, 29% for Stephens. Stephens claimed he had been the victim of a negative campaign, citing mailings that were distributed calling him a 'country-club liberal' and highlighting his close relationship with Assembly Speaker Sheldon Silver. However, Stephens himself drew criticism when he refused to repudiate a letter about challenger Greg Ball which falsely claimed Ball had received a dishonorable discharge from the United States Air Force. Ball did not dispute that he ran hard for his seat, knocking on 10,000 doors prior to the primary.

=== General election ===
==== Republican candidate ====
Greg Ball, a retired Air Force Captain and Vice President of Exceed International Development Corporation, scored a major upset when he defeated the incumbent Stephens in the September 12th primary by nearly a three to one margin.

The Ball campaign picked up steam since Stephen's wayward email referring to his constituents as 'idiots', and another letter purported to be sent by the Stephens campaign which claimed that Captain Ball received a dishonorable discharge, which was discredited when a copy of Captain Ball's DD-214 showed he had received an honorable discharge. Stephens insisted neither he, his staff nor anyone associated with his campaign had knowledge of the letter and his involvement was never proven.

==== Democratic candidate ====
Ken Harper, the Chairman of the Putnam County Democratic Committee, ran unopposed for the Democratic nomination. He is known for writing frequent letters to the editor in local newspapers. Harper had failed in six previous bids for public office including Putnam County Executive in 1998 and 2002, Putnam County Legislator in 2003, Patterson Town Supervisor in 1997 and 1999, and Paterson Town Councilman in 2005. Although in other years, the previous incumbent had been challenged by only token opposition, this would be the first that the seat would be competitive in over a decade. Harper received funding of over $250,000 to Ball's from the New York State Democratic Assembly Campaign Committee (DACC) for the campaign. However, he was unable to prevail.

Ball criticized his opponent after he pointed out to The Journal News that a League of Women Voters brochure inaccurately listed Harper was a college graduate. Ball said a note that appeared after Harper's name, stating that the Democrat graduated from the University of Pennsylvania in 1982 with a bachelor's in English, was false. Both a university spokesman and Harper confirmed that fact, stating that Harper attended the institution, but that there was no record of him having received a degree. Harper stated he never misrepresented himself as a college graduate and was not responsible for the content of the pamphlet.

==== Third-party candidates ====
Six-term incumbent Will Stephens II, 48, ran for re-election in the Republican Primary in September 2006 for the seat once held by his father and grandfather. After losing the Republican Primary, due to New York's electoral fusion system, the Assemblyman had vowed to remain in the race on the Conservative and Independence lines. Ultimately, Stephens decided to withdraw from the race altogether, instead taking a nomination for Supreme Court Justice in Queens, in order to allow Ball ballot access on the Independence and Conservative lines. Although Stephens attempted to have his name removed from the ballot, Harper, the Democratic nominee, sued the State Board of Elections claiming that Stephens had filed a certificate declining his nomination eight days too late. The New York Court of Appeals eventually ruled that Stephens's name should remain on the ballot.

== Electoral history ==
State Assembly – 99th district, 2006 – General Election
Party	Candidate	Votes	%	±%
Republican	Gregory R. Ball	20,956	50.8%	Republican hold
Democratic	Ken Harper	17,155	41.4%	
Independence, Conservative	Willis Stephens, Jr. (I)	3,228	7.8%	

State Assembly, 99th district, 2006 – Primary Election
Party	Candidate	Votes	%	±%
Republican	Gregory R. Ball	5165	70.4%	Challenger pickup
Republican	Willis Stephens, Jr. (I)	2176	29.6%	

State Assembly – 99th district, 2004 – General Election
Party	Candidate	Votes	%	±%
Republican	Willis Stephens, Jr. (I)	26,626	100%	Republican hold

State Assembly – 99th district, 2002 – General Election
Party	Candidate	Votes	%	±%
Republican	Willis Stephens	26,310	91.7%	Republican hold
Right to Life	Frank X. Lloyd	1,372	4.7%	
Working Families	Elizabeth S. Felber	1,027	3.6%	

State Assembly – 99th district, 2000 – General Election
Party	Candidate	Votes	%	±%
Republican	Patrick R. Manning	36,062	73.0%	Republican hold
Democratic	Maurice Salem	13,342	27.0%	

State Assembly – 99th district, 1998 – General Election
Party	Candidate	Votes	%	±%
Republican	Patrick R. Manning	26,758	71.9%	Republican hold
Democratic	Dana L. Robideau	10,504	28.1%	

== See also ==
- List of members of the New York State Assembly
