= Tom Basile =

American businessman and politician (born 1975)

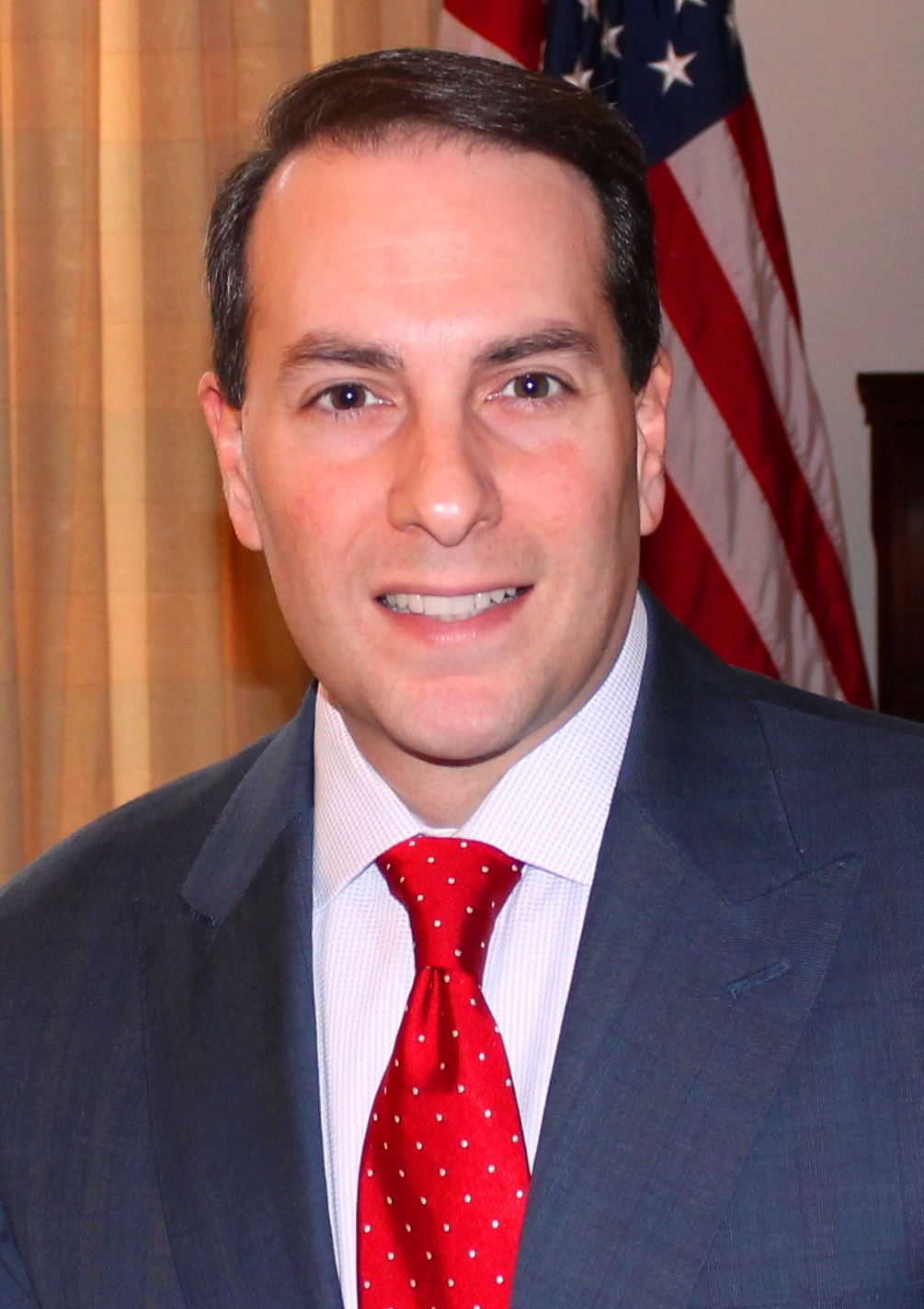
- Basile in 2016
- Born: October 22, 1975 (age 50)
- Education: Hofstra University (BA); Fordham University School of Law (JD)
- Occupations: news anchor, political columnist and commentator, former Republican politician
- Political party: Republican
- Website: tombasile.com

Thomas J. Basile (born October 22, 1975) is an American television news anchor, political columnist and commentator, and former Republican politician in New York. He served in the George W. Bush administration in various capacities, including in Iraq, and was the executive director of the New York Republican Party from 2009–2011.

Basile is the host of "America Right Now" on Newsmax TV and a writer on politics, public policy, faith and social topics, and has written for Forbes, Fox News, Newsmax and the Washington Times. He is the author of the 2017 book Tough Sell: Fighting The Media War In Iraq.

== Early life and education ==
Basile grew up in Clarkstown, New York, in Rockland County. He attended Clarkstown High School South. In 1993, he became the first student member of the Clarkstown Board of Education.

Basile graduated from Hofstra University in 1997, with a BA in political science and history. He then earned a JD from the Fordham University School of Law. While he no longer resides in New York, he still maintains his NYS Bar membership.

== Career ==
In 1997, after graduating from Hofstra, Basile ran as a Republican for Clarkstown Town Supervisor. The incumbent Democrat went on to win. From 1997–2000, Basile served in Governor George Pataki's administration as Public Relations Director for the New York State Office of Parks Recreation and Historic Preservation.

Basile worked for the 2000 Bush–Cheney presidential campaign and was a consultant to the Republican National Committee during the 2004 Presidential election.

In the George W. Bush administration, Basile served as Director of Communications for the U.S. Environmental Protection Agency (EPA) under Christine Todd Whitman. From 2003–2004, Basile served in Iraq as senior advisor to the Coalition Provisional Authority (CPA) under Ambassador Paul Bremer. The U.S. Department of Defense subsequently awarded him the Joint Civilian Service Commendation for his service with the Coalition.

Basile was the press secretary for the second inauguration of George W. Bush in January 2005.

From 2009–2011, Basile was executive director of the New York Republican Party. With David Webb, Basile co-founded TeaParty365, the New York City metropolitan area chapter of the Tea Party movement.

Basile served as an elected councilman in Stony Point, New York, from January 2014 until January 2022. He also served as the Deputy Town Supervisor. Basile and Webb were featured in the 2011 Time Person of the Year report, "The Protester", as leaders in the Tea Party Movement.

In 2018, Basile unsuccessfully ran for a seat in the New York State Senate to represent the 39th district, defeated by Democrat James Skoufis.

Basile founded the strategic communications firm Empire Solutions in 2005 after leaving government and continued until his departure in 2022. Basile is also an adjunct professor at Fordham University's Graduate School of Arts and Sciences.

== Publications and writings ==
Basile began writing political commentary following his departure from government and was a Forbes Opinion contributor from 2012 until 2018. He has written for a number of conservative publications including Fox News and Newsmax. Since 2021 he has been an opinion columnist for the Washington Times and is a contributor to The Daily Caller.

Basile is the author of the 2017 book Tough Sell: Fighting The Media War In Iraq, published by Potomac Books. The book's foreword is by former US Ambassador to the UN and former National Security Advisor John Bolton. In the book, he relates his firsthand experiences in Baghdad during the Iraq War and criticizes the media for biased coverage. While he defends the Bush administration's decision to launch the war, he is critical of the communications strategy to defend the policy. Reviewing the book in the U.S. Army War College journal Parameters, James P. Farwell wrote, "Basile merits high credit for his patriotic service and his thought-provoking book that provides keen insights into what it takes to make strategic communication in war zones a success and into the obstacles to good strategic communication. Tough Sell is highly recommended.

Tom Basile was featured in the 2022 documentary Crime and No Punishment, produced by Secure America Now. Basile began hosting long-form radio programs for SiriusXM in 2016 for the Patriot Channel and the Catholic Channel. Currently contributing to Sunday in America on Sirius XM Patriot radio, a week-in-review political show.

== Personal life ==
Basile currently resides in Tennessee, with his wife and their three children. He is a Knight Commander with Star in the Roman Catholic Order of the Holy Sepulchre. He is a board member of Catholic Dads and an advisory board member of the Peter S. Kalikow School of Government, Public Policy and Public Service Programs (PPPS).
