= George A. Amedore Jr. =

American politician

George Amedore
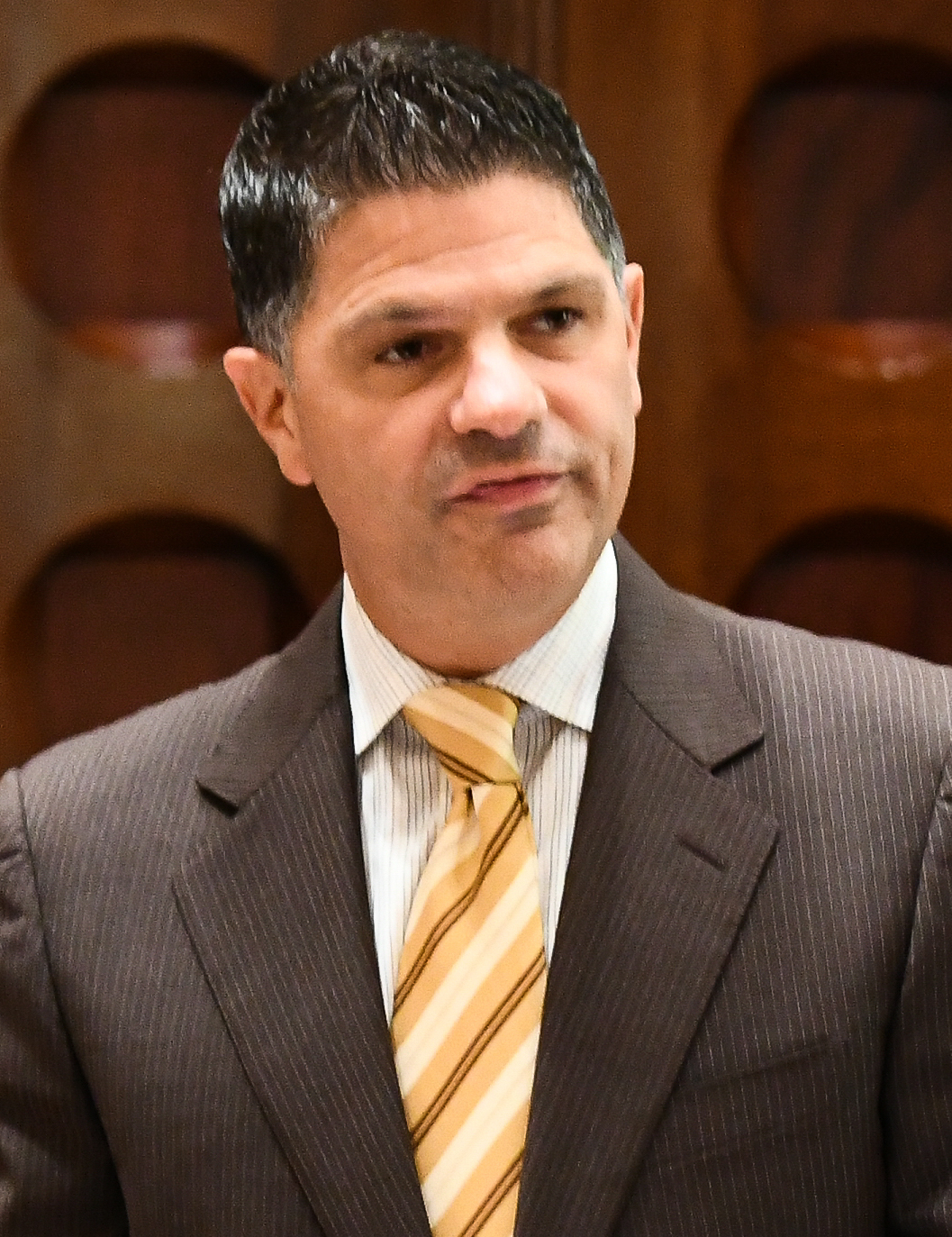

Member of the New York State Senate from the 46th district
- In office January 3, 2015 – December 31, 2020
- Preceded by: Cecilia Tkaczyk
- Succeeded by: Michelle Hinchey
- In office January 1, 2013 – January 23, 2013
- Preceded by: Open seat (redistricting)
- Succeeded by: Cecilia Tkaczyk

Member of the New York State Assembly from the 105th district
- In office July 2007 – December 31, 2012
- Preceded by: Paul Tonko
- Succeeded by: Kieran Lalor

Personal details
- Born: April 2, 1969 (age 57) Niskayuna, New York, U.S.
- Party: Republican
- Spouse: Joelle
- Children: 3
- Profession: Homebuilder
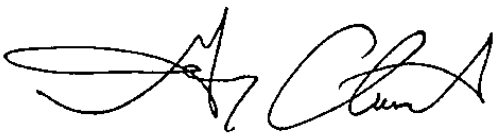
- Signature
- Website: Official website

George A. Amedore Jr. (born April 2, 1969) is an American homebuilder, businessman, and Republican politician. Amedore formerly represented the 46th district in the New York State Senate. The district encompasses all of Montgomery and Greene counties and portions of Schenectady, Albany, and Ulster counties.

From 2007 to 2013, Amedore represented the 105th district in the New York State Assembly. At the time, this district included all of Montgomery County and part of Schenectady County.

== Early life and career ==
Amedore was born and raised in Schenectady County. As of 2011, he was Vice President of Amedore Homes, a business founded in 1974 by his father, George Amedore, Sr. In 2007, Amedore and his family business were "featured on ABC-TV's "Extreme Makeover -- Home Edition" when they "brought together dozens of subcontractors to build a 3,600-square-foot home at no cost" for a local family.

== New York State Assembly ==
Amedore was first elected to the State Assembly on July 31, 2007, in a special election to fill a vacancy created by Paul Tonko's appointment by Governor Eliot Spitzer to lead the New York State Energy Research and Development Authority. Amedore ran against Democrat Ed Kosiur, a Schenectady County legislator.

Amedore was re-elected to the Assembly in 2008 and 2010, defeating Democrats Mark Blanchfield and Angelo Santabarbara, respectively.

== New York State Senate ==
Rather than seeking re-election to the Assembly in 2012, Amedore chose to run for the New York State Senate in district 46. The district was a newly drawn district stretching from Montgomery County to Ulster County. Although there were more registered Democrats than Republicans in the district, Amedore was initially favored because he had represented the entire northern portion of the district for five years.

Amedore trailed Democrat Cecilia Tkaczyk on election night, but legal action by Amedore forced a judge to monitor the counting of 6,000 provisional and absentee ballots. The judge threw out 450 votes, enough to give Amedore a 37-vote lead. Amedore was certified as the winner and filed his oath of office in January. However, Tkaczyk appealed, contending that since the ballots were primarily in Democratic-leaning areas, she could potentially win if they were all counted. Eventually, a court ordered 99 ballots in Ulster, Albany, and Greene counties opened. Tkaczyk picked up enough votes in the opened ballots to take an 18-vote lead. Amedore conceded the race on January 18. At the time, according to the Albany Times Union, Amedore was the shortest-tenured senator in the modern history of that chamber.

Amedore ran against then-incumbent Senator Tkaczyk in the 2014 elections and won. He was re-elected in 2016, defeating challenger Sara Niccoli by a wide margin. He again won reelection in 2018.

Prior to Democrats taking the majority, Amedore served as Chair of the Senate Alcoholism and Drug Abuse Committee and the Senate Technology and Innovation Task Force. He also served as Co-Chair of the Heroin Task Force.

Amedore received the 2019 Oil Slick Award from Environmental Advocates for what they deemed to be his consistently-poor environmental record.

In November 2019, Amedore announced that he would not seek re-election to the Senate in 2020.

== Personal ==
Amedore resides in Rotterdam, New York with his wife Joelle. The Amedores have three children: George, Anthony, and Bria. Amedore is a Christian. As of 2011, Amedore was a member of Calvary Tabernacle Assembly of God Church in Schenectady.

== Election results ==
- July 2007 special election, NYS Assembly, 105th AD

George A. Amedore Jr. (REP - CON)	...	14,178
Edward J. Kosiur (DEM - IND - WOR)	...	11,186

- November 2008 general election, NYS Assembly, 105th AD

George A. Amedore Jr. (REP - CON)	...	29,784
Mark W. Blanchfield (DEM - IND - WOR)	...	18,404

- November 2010 general election, NYS Assembly, 105th AD

George A. Amedore Jr. (REP - IND - CON)	...	21,438
Angelo L. Santabarbara (DEM - WOR )	...	15,089

- November 2012 general election, NYS Senate, 46th SD

George A. Amedore Jr. (REP - IND - CON)	...	63,195
Cecilia F. Tkaczyk (DEM - WOR	...	63,213

- November 2014 general election, NYS Senate, 46th SD

George A. Amedore Jr. (REP - IND - CON)	...	53,553
Cecilia F. Tkaczyk (DEM - WOR	...	42,009

- November 2016 general election, NYS Senate, 46th SD

George A. Amedore Jr. (REP - IND - CON)	...	84,716
Sara Niccoli (DEM - WOR - WEP)	...	50,071

- November 2018 general election, NYS Senate, 46th SD

George A. Amedore Jr. (REP - IND - CON)	...	68,259
Pat Courtney Strong (DEM - WOR - WEP)	...	54,116

New York State Assembly
Preceded by Paul Tonko	New York State Assembly, 105th district July 31, 2007 – December 31, 2012	Succeeded by Angelo Santabarbara
Preceded by Cecilia Tkaczyk	New York State Senate, 46th district January 1, 2015 – December 31, 2020	Succeeded by Michelle Hinchey
