= Terry Gipson =

American politician (born 1963)

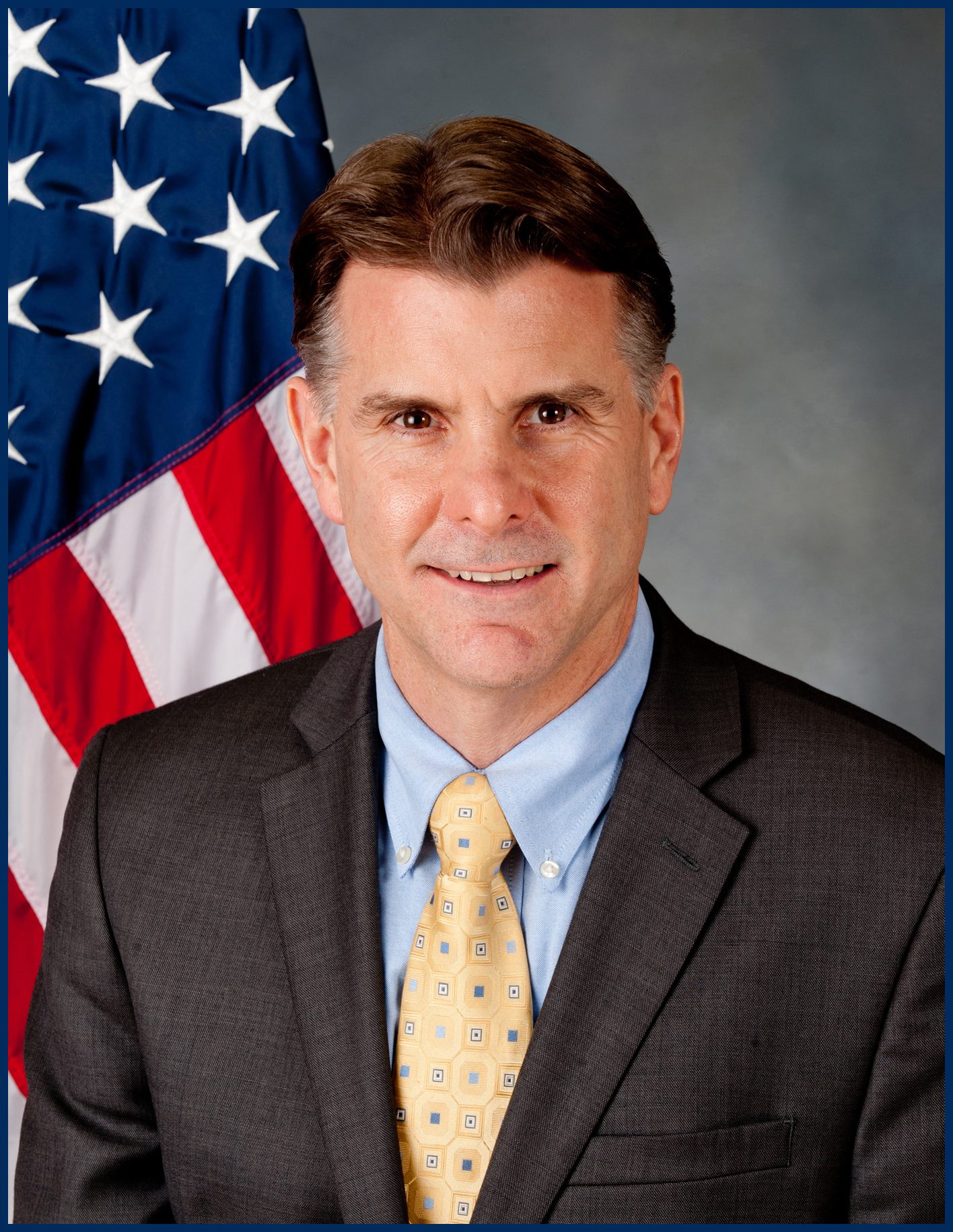

Member of the New York State Senate from the 41st district
- In office January 1, 2013 – December 31, 2014
- Preceded by: Stephen Saland
- Succeeded by: Sue Serino

Personal details
- Born: April 2, 1963 (age 63) Terrell, Texas, U.S.
- Party: Democratic
- Spouse: Michelle Donner
- Education: Texas Tech University (BFA); Penn State University (MFA)
- Website: www.terrygipsonny.com

Terry W. Gipson (born April 2, 1963) is an American politician and college instructor who was elected as a Democratic member of the New York Senate in November 2012, and served from January 1, 2013, through December 31, 2014, in the 200th State Legislature. He represented the state's 41st district, which covers most of Dutchess County and Putnam County. He launched a campaign for Governor of New York in 2017 to challenge incumbent Democrat Andrew Cuomo; Gipson withdrew from the race in 2018.

== Early life and career ==
Gipson was born in Terrell, Texas and raised in Tyler, Texas. He received a BFA from Texas Tech University in 1987, and an MFA from Penn State University in 1991. Gipson served as a volunteer firefighter and worked as a design director for MTV Networks and a designer for Rockwell Architecture, before opening his own business. In 2006, Gipson opened Gipson Design Group, located in Rhinebeck, New York, where he was twice elected a trustee to the Rhinebeck Village Board before winning election to the Senate. He closed his business in January 2013, in order to work full-time as a senator.

== Political career ==
=== 2012 New York State Senate election ===
Gipson is a Democrat who was elected to the New York Senate in 2012 by edging longtime Republican senator Stephen Saland by 2,100 votes following Saland's controversial 2011 vote in favor of same-sex marriage. Gipson was not Saland's only opponent; Saland also faced a challenge from Neil Di Carlo, who received 17,000 votes on the Conservative line. Gipson is the first and only Democrat since Franklin Delano Roosevelt to have held this seat.

=== State Senate tenure ===
As a senator, Gipson advocated for the inclusion of Dutchess and Putnam counties in the 0% manufacturing tax plan passed in the 2014–2015 state budget. His Senate office secured construction and infrastructure grants for The Center for the Prevention of Child Abuse in Poughkeepsie, The Imagination Station in Kent, Town of Hyde Park’s business district, and the Village of Wappingers Falls.

Gipson sponsored legislation that designated Wappinger Creek as an inland waterway. This act provided the opportunity for the 13 surrounding municipalities to apply for state and federal funding for waterfront revitalization, storm water treatment, and wastewater management, among other projects.

Senator Gipson was a staunch advocate for the prevention and treatment of Lyme disease. During his term, he sponsored and cosponsored legislation to compensate victims of Lyme disease and tick-borne pathogens for the costs of long-term medical care, increase funding for tick-borne illness research, and to protect doctors trying to relieve the suffering of people suffering with chronic Lyme disease.

Gipson received the top score from Environmental Advocates for his record on environmental protection and conversation. He supported a ban on hydrofracking and on the use of fracking chemicals as road de-icer in New York. Senator Gipson also supported a $90 million investment in New York State Parks in the 2014-15 state budget, which included funding for parks and historic sites in his district.

Gipson sponsored a bill to ban Pearson, the for-profit testing company, from New York State.

A member of the Senate Veterans Committee , Senator Gipson hosted an annual veterans' fair to recognize their service and to connect veterans and their families to a variety of support organizations.

=== Committee assignments ===
Gipson served as the ranking member of the Agriculture and Local Government committees. He served as a member of the Banks, Consumer Protection, Cultural Affairs, Tourism, Veterans, Racing and Wagering committees.

=== Vampire Bill ===
Early in his term, recognizing that critical legislation often took place late in the night when constituents were less likely to be paying attention, Gipson introduced the Vampire Voting Act, intended to make the state legislature more transparent by prohibiting voting on bills (“vampire bills”) between 9pm and 9am.

=== Subsequent elections ===
In a November 2014 re-election bid, Gipson was defeated by Republican Susan J. Serino. Gipson was again defeated by Serino in a 2016 rematch.

In late 2017, Gipson announced that he would challenge incumbent governor Andrew Cuomo in the 2018 Democratic gubernatorial primary. Gipson ended that campaign several months later when actress Cynthia Nixon announced she, too, was challenging the governor.

== Later career ==
From 2016 to 2022, Gipson was a full-time lecturer in the Communications Department at SUNY New Paltz and taught Speech Communication at Rensselaer Polytechnic Institute. Since 2022, Gipson has been teaching at Harvard University, where he teaches public speaking, strategic communication, and public relations in the writing program.

New York State Senate
Preceded by Stephen Saland	New York State Senate, 41st District; 2013–2014	Succeeded by Susan J. Serino
