= Robert Rolison =

American politician

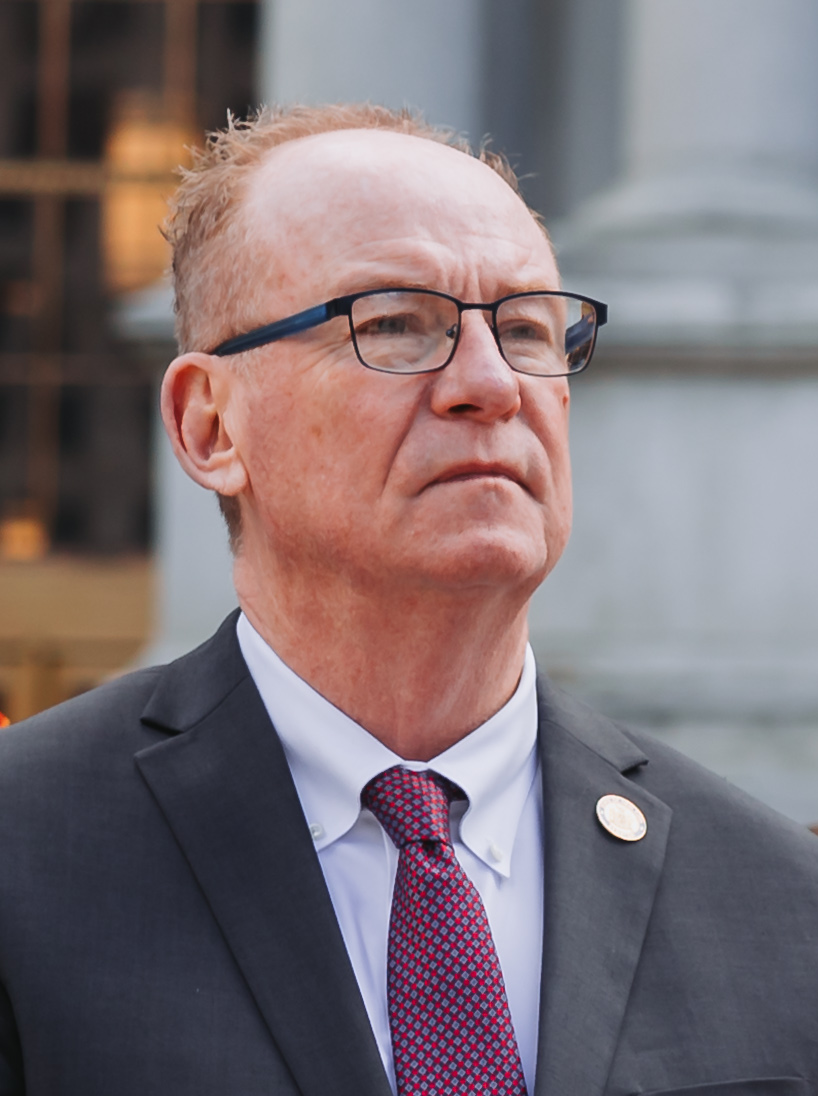

Member of the New York State Senate from the 39th district
- Incumbent
- Assumed office January 1, 2023
- Preceded by: Open seat (redistricting)

Mayor of Poughkeepsie
- In office January 1, 2016 – December 31, 2022
- Preceded by: John Tkazyik
- Succeeded by: Marc Nelson

Member of the Dutchess County Legislature
- In office 2003 – 2015; Chairman: 2010–2015

Personal details
- Party: Republican
- Spouse: Lori Rolison
- Children: 1
- Relatives: Jay P. Rolison, Jr.
- Education: Marist College

Robert Rolison is a politician currently serving in the New York State Senate and a retired American law enforcement officer.

== Career ==
=== Law Enforcement ===
In 1982, Rolison joined the Town of Poughkeepsie's police department and served for 12 years in the patrol division and 14 additional years as a detective.

=== Politics ===
From 2003 to 2015, Rolison served on the Dutchess County Legislature as a county legislator, serving as chairman of the legislature from 2010 to 2015.

From 2016 to 2022 he served as mayor of the city of Poughkeepsie.

In 2022, Rolison announced a bid for State Senate District 39, which was held by Democrat James Skoufis prior to redistricting. He defeated Democratic candidate Julie Shiroishi with 53.1% of the vote, flipping the seat.

In 2024, he ran for reelection, defeating Democratic candidate Yvette Valdes Smith, with 50.7% of the vote.

== See also ==
- List of mayors of Poughkeepsie, New York
