= United States Post Office (Port Jervis, New York) =

- U.S. Post Office
- U.S. National Register of Historic Places
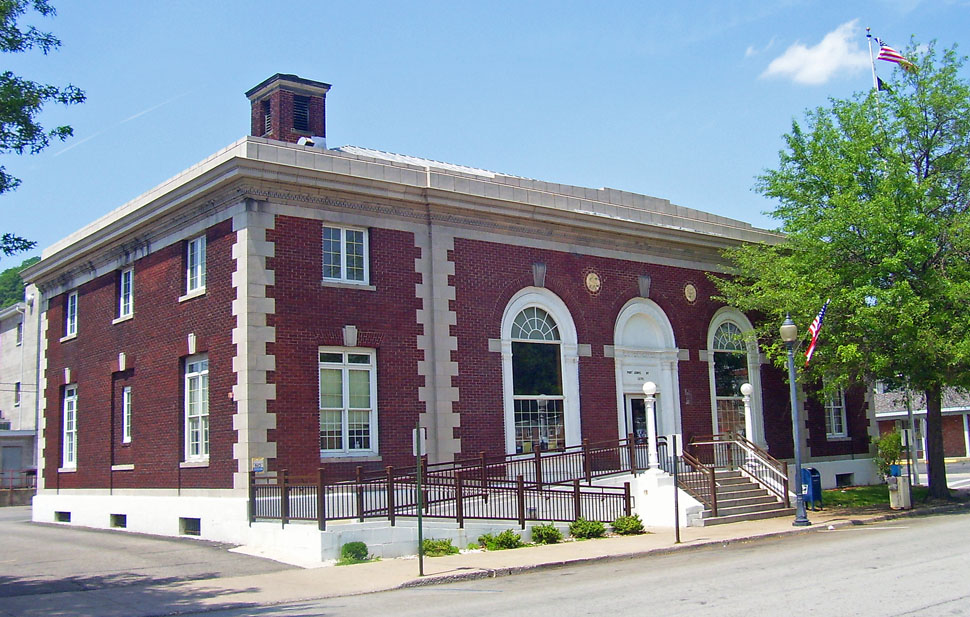
- (Memorial Day 2007)
- Location: Port Jervis, NY
- Coordinates: 41°22′30″N 74°41′33″W
- Built: Early 1920s
- Architect: Oscar Wenderoth
- Architectural style: Colonial Revival
- MPS: US Post Offices in New York State, 1858-1943, TR
- NRHP reference No.: 88002408
- Added to NRHP: May 11, 1989

The U.S. Post Office in Port Jervis, New York, serves the 12771 ZIP Code. This covers all of the city of Port Jervis and adjoining portions of the Town of Deer Park. It is located downtown, at 20 Sussex St.

The building was designed by Oscar Wenderoth in the early 1920s in a Colonial Revival style of brick and mortar. It was added to the National Register of Historic Places in 1989. In 2007, the United States Congress enacted legislation introduced by Rep. John Hall to rename the building the E. Arthur Gray Post Office Building, after E. Arthur Gray, mayor of Port Jervis from 1978–88.
