= Michelle Hinchey =

American politician

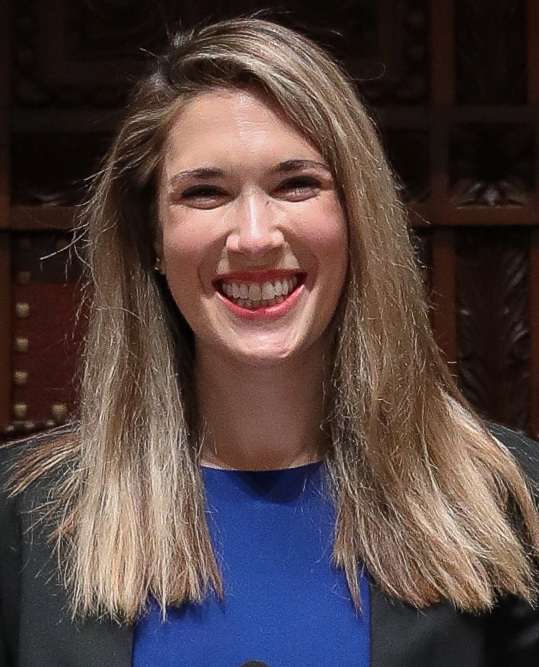

Member of the New York Senate from the 41st district
- Incumbent
- Assumed office January 1, 2021
- Preceded by: George Amedore
- Constituency: 46th district (2021–2022); 41st district (2023–present)

Personal details
- Born: November 3, 1987 (age 38)
- Party: Democratic
- Relatives: Maurice Hinchey (father)
- Education: Cornell University (BS)
- Website: Campaign website State Senate website

Michelle Hinchey (born November 3, 1987) is an American politician serving as a member of the New York State Senate for the 41st district. Elected in November 2020, she assumed office on January 1, 2021.

== Early life and education ==
Hinchey, the daughter of former Congressman Maurice Hinchey and Ilene Marder Hinchey, was born in 1987 and grew up in Saugerties. After graduating from Saugerties High School, she earned a Bachelor of Science degree from Cornell University.

== Career ==
Hinchey worked as a communications executive and served on the board of the Catskill Center for Conservation and Development.

In 2020, Hinchey announced she would run for the 46th district of the New York State Senate, which was being vacated by retiring Republican George Amedore. After winning the Democratic primary unopposed, Hinchey narrowly defeated Richard Amedure, her Republican opponent and George Amedore's distant cousin, by a margin of 51–49%. Hinchey took office in January 2021 as part of the first Democratic Senate supermajority in decades.

As a result of 2022 New York redistricting, Hinchey ran for reelection in the newly drawn 41st Senate district, against fellow incumbent Sue Serino. In November 2022, Hinchey won reelection, defeating Republican Serino with 52.5% of the vote to Serino’s 47.6%.

Hinchey serves as chair of the Senate Agriculture Committee, and introduced legislation establishing a farm soil health program advocated by the College of Agriculture and Life Sciences at her alma mater, Cornell University.

After Congressman Antonio Delgado was selected to serve as lieutenant governor of New York in May 2022, Hinchey was mentioned as a possible candidate in a special election to fill his vacant House seat.
