= James Skoufis =

American politician (born 1987)

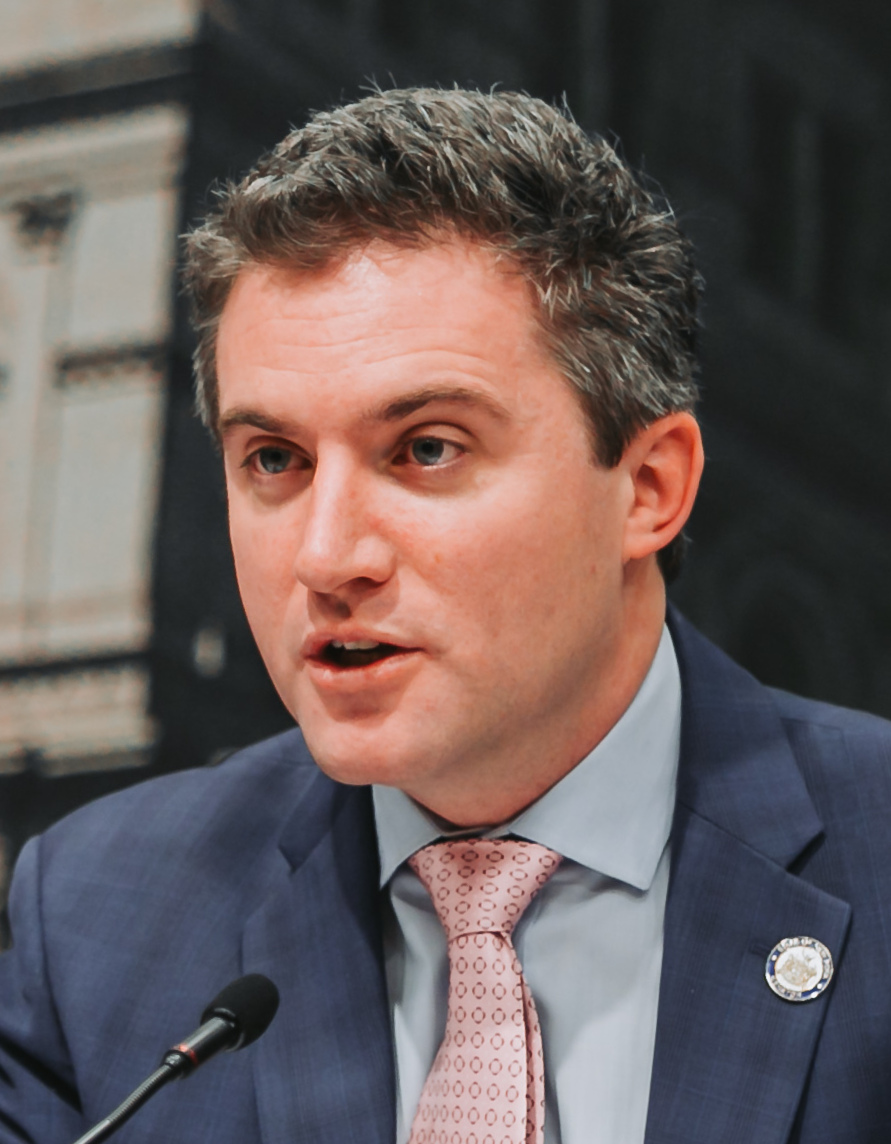
- Skoufis in 2024

Member of the New York Senate from the 42nd district
- Incumbent
- Assumed office January 1, 2019
- Preceded by: William J. Larkin Jr.
- Constituency: 39th district (2019–2022); 42nd district (2023–present)

Member of the New York State Assembly from the 99th district
- In office January 1, 2013 – December 31, 2018
- Preceded by: Steve Katz
- Succeeded by: Colin Schmitt

Personal details
- Born: October 18, 1987 (age 39) New York City, New York, U.S.
- Party: Democratic
- Spouse: Hillary Stuchin (m. 2017)
- Children: 1
- Education: George Washington University (BA); Columbia University (MA)
- Website: State Senate website

James Skoufis (born October 18, 1987) is an American politician of the Democratic Party currently representing the 42nd District of the New York State Senate since 2023. Skoufis previously represented the 39th District prior to redistricting from 2019 to 2022.

Skoufis began his political career on the Woodbury town board in Orange County. In 2012 he was elected to the New York State Assembly, becoming its youngest member at 25. He was re-elected in 2014 and 2016. He ran for Chair of the Democratic National Committee in the 2025 chairmanship election.

== Early life ==
Skoufis was born in Flushing, Queens in 1987, the son of a Greek immigrant. His family moved north to the town of Woodbury in the Hudson Valley in 1995. He graduated from Monroe-Woodbury High School in 2005. He has a bachelor's degree from The George Washington University and a masters from Columbia University. Skoufis worked at Amerigard Alarm & Security Corporation and was on the Woodbury Town Board.

== New York State Assembly ==
After redistricting in 2012 following the decennial census, long-time Republican Assemblywoman Nancy Calhoun decided to retire, leaving the seat vacant. Skoufis received the Democratic nomination for the seat, defeating Larry Delarose at the party's county convention. In the November general election, he defeated Republican Goshen Mayor Kyle Roddey with 56% of the vote. At age 24, he became the youngest member of the Assembly.

Skoufis introduced his first two bills within a week of being sworn in; both were inspired by the aftermath of Hurricane Irene in 2011. Both bills passed the Assembly a few months later. Skoufis was an outspoken supporter of increasing the minimum wage. Early in 2014, Skoufis introduced Tuition-Free NY, a proposal to make SUNY and CUNY in New York State tuition-free as long as students fulfill community service and residency requirements.

== New York State Senate ==
In 2018, longtime Senator William J. Larkin Jr. retired at age 88. He had served in the seat since 1991. Prior to Larkin's retirement, Skoufis was floated as a potential challenger. After Larkin announced his retirement, Skoufis entered the race. In a good year for Democrats, Skoufis defeated Republican Stony Point Councilman Tom Basile, 54 percent to 46 percent. Democrats also took the majority in the Senate in the same election.

In the Senate, Skoufis was the Chair of the Committee on Investigations and Government Operations.

In 2023, Skoufis opposed plans for congestion pricing in Manhattan, citing the lack of viable transportation alternatives for his constituents. He called the congestion pricing plan "outright theft" and said he would support lawsuits to block the plan.

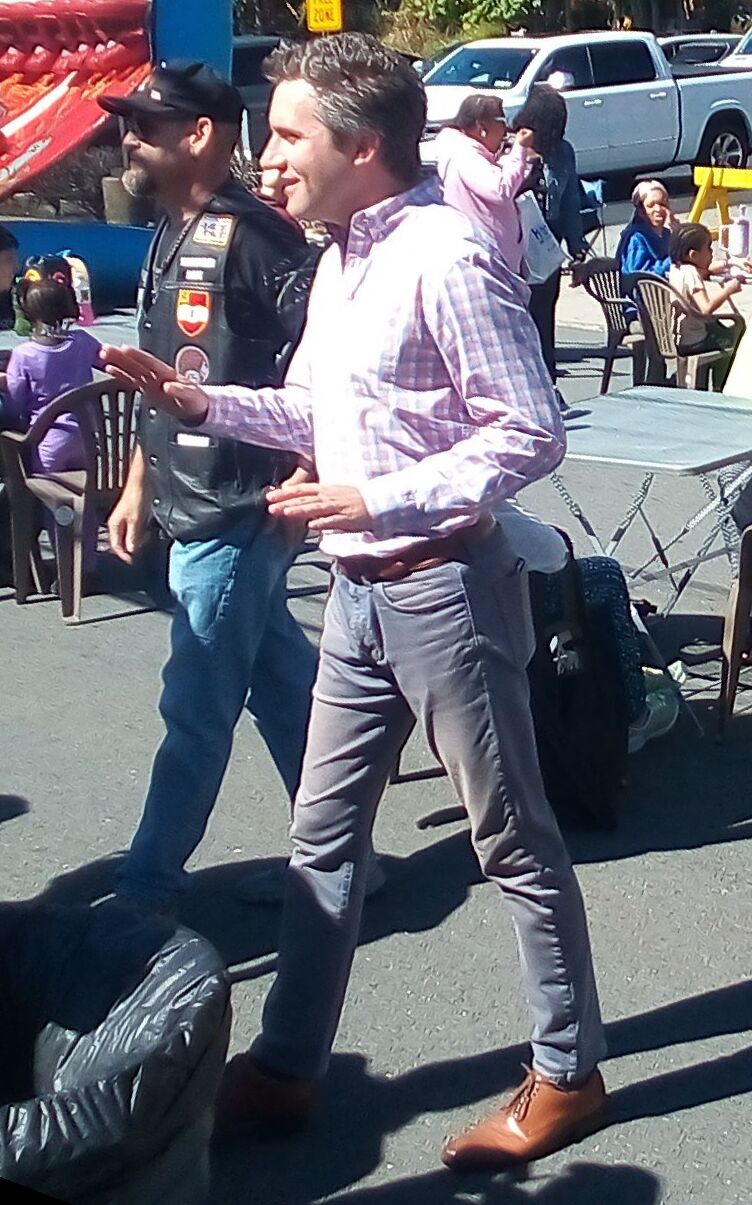
Skoufis in 2025

== 2025 Democratic National Committee Chair race ==
After Kamala Harris's loss to Donald Trump in the 2024 United States presidential election, Skoufis announced his intention to seek chairman role of the Democratic National Committee.

While running for the chairman, Skoufis declared his aspiration to "dismantle" the Green Party.

On January 16, 2025, Skoufis announced that he withdrew from the race and endorsed Ken Martin for the chairmanship.

== Personal life ==
Skoufis married Hillary Lynn Stuchin on May 20, 2017. They have a daughter, born in 2021. He has two sisters.

== Electoral history ==
=== New York State Assembly ===
2012 New York's 99th assembly district election
Party	Candidate	Votes	%
Democratic	James G. Skoufis	26,325	50.22%
Working Families	James G. Skoufis	2,705	5.18%
Total	James G. Skoufis	29,030	55.57%
Republican	Kyle Roddey	19,032	36.43%
Conservative	Kyle Roddey	3,265	6.25%
Independence	Kyle Roddey	874	1.67%
Total	Kyle Roddey	23,171	44.35%
Write-in		44	0.08%
Total votes		52,245	100%
Democratic gain from Republican			

2014 New York's 99th assembly district election
Party	Candidate	Votes	%
Democratic	James G. Skoufis	15,672	46.04%
Working Families	James G. Skoufis	2,165	6.36%
Total	James G. Skoufis (incumbent)	17,837	52.40%
Republican	Richard M. Cocchiara	12,365	36.33%
Conservative	Richard M. Cocchiara	3,184	9.35%
Independence	Richard M. Cocchiara	637	1.87%
Total	Richard M. Cocchiara	16,186	47.55%
Write-in		14	0.04%
Total votes		34,037	100%
Democratic hold			

2016 New York's 99th assembly district election
Party	Candidate	Votes	%
Democratic	James G. Skoufis	26,971	48.04%
Working Families	James G. Skoufis	2,082	3.71%
Women's Equality	James G. Skoufis	537	0.96%
Total	James G. Skoufis (incumbent)	29,590	52.70%
Republican	Colin Schmitt	22,178	39.50%
Conservative	Colin Schmitt	3,284	5.85%
Independence	Colin Schmitt	910	1.62%
Reform	Colin Schmitt	169	0.30%
Total	Colin Schmitt	26,541	47.27%
Write-in		16	0.03%
Total votes		56,147	100%
Democratic hold			

=== New York State Senate ===
2018 New York's 39th senatorial district Reform Party primary
Party	Candidate	Votes	%
Reform	James G. Skoufis	931	99.68%
Write-in		3	0.32%
Total votes		934	100%

2018 New York's 39th senatorial district election
Party	Candidate	Votes	%
Democratic	James G. Skoufis	48,267	50.50%
Working Families	James G. Skoufis	1,862	1.92%
Reform	James G. Skoufis	712	0.74%
Women's Equality	James G. Skoufis	707	0.74%
Total	James G. Skoufis	51,548	53.94%
Republican	Tom Basile	34,195	35.78%
Conservative	Tom Basile	5,080	5.32%
Independence	Tom Basile	4,713	4.93%
Total	Tom Basile	43,988	46.03%
Write-in		36	0.04%
Total votes		95,572	100%
Democratic gain from Republican			

2020 New York's 39th senatorial district election
Party	Candidate	Votes	%
Democratic	James G. Skoufis	66,758	52.48%
Working Families	James G. Skoufis	5,356	4.21%
SAM	James G. Skoufis	404	0.32%
Total	James G. Skoufis	72,518	57.01%
Republican	Steve Brescia	48,635	38.23%
Conservative	Steve Brescia	5,963	4.69%
Total	Steve Brescia	54,598	42.92%
Write-in		85	0.07%
Total votes		127,201	100%
Democratic hold			

2022 New York's 42nd senatorial district election
Party	Candidate	Votes	%
Democratic	James G. Skoufis	46,686	47.61
Working Families	James G. Skoufis	3,042	3.10
Total	James G. Skoufis	49,728	50.71%
Republican	Dorey Houle	43,292	44.15%
Conservative	Dorey Houle	5,004	5.10%
Total	Dorey Houle	48,296	49.25%
Write-in		35	0.04%
Total votes		98,059	100%
Democratic gain from Republican			

2024 New York's 42nd senatorial district election
Party	Candidate	Votes	%
Democratic	James G. Skoufis	68,764	51.01
Working Families	James G. Skoufis	4,656	3.45
Total	James G. Skoufis	73,420	54.46%
Republican	Dorey F. Houle	54,614	40.51%
Conservative	Timothy Mitts	6,694	4.97%
Write-in		77	0.06%
Total votes		134,805	100%
Democratic hold			

== See also ==
- List of Columbia University alumni
- List of George Washington University alumni
- List of Greek Americans
