= Sue Serino =

American politician (born 1961)

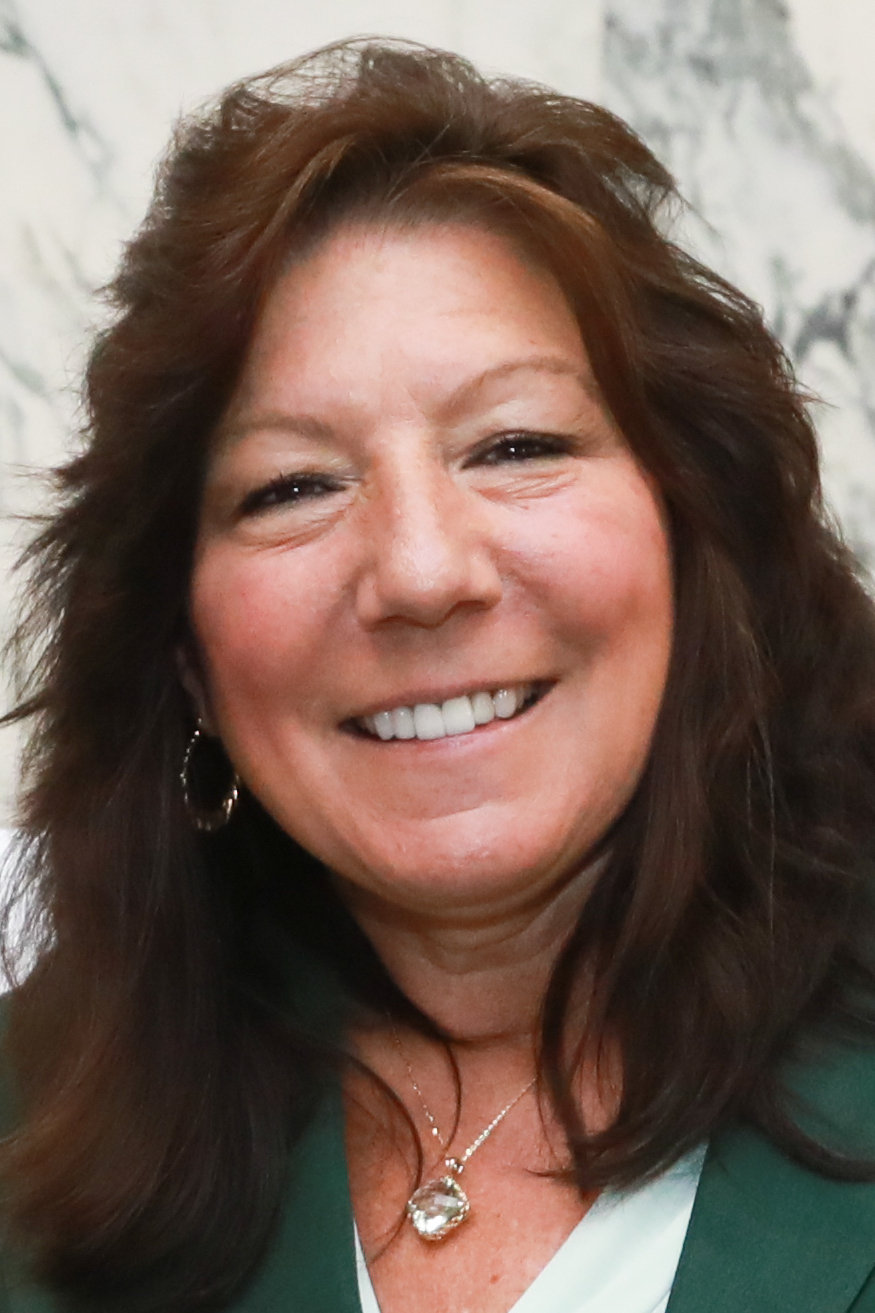
- Serino in 2022

County Executive of Dutchess County
- Incumbent
- Assumed office January 1, 2024

Member of the New York State Senate from the 41st district
- In office January 1, 2015 – December 31, 2022
- Preceded by: Terry Gipson
- Succeeded by: Michelle Hinchey

Personal details
- Born: Susan J. Cvijanovich; September 8, 1961 (age 64)
- Party: Republican
- Spouse: Mark Serino
- Children: 1
- Website: Dutchess County Executive Sue Serino

Susan J. Serino (born September 8, 1961) is an American politician and businesswoman from the state of New York. A Republican, Serino has served as Dutchess County executive since January 1, 2024. Previously, she was a member of the New York State Senate, representing the 41st district from 2015 to 2022. Prior to her State Senate tenure, Serino served as a member of the Hyde Park Town Board and the Dutchess County Legislature.

== Early life ==
Serino was born on September 8, 1961. She was born and raised in Dutchess County, New York. Serino is the daughter of immigrants. She has worked as a waitress and has started her own childcare business.

In 1996, Serino joined the real estate industry, opening a real estate office in Poughkeepsie. In 2003, she moved her office to Hyde Park, New York. As of 2019, the business she built employed over twenty sales associates.

== Local politics ==
In 2010, Serino was elected to the Hyde Park Town Board. A year later, in 2011, Serino was elected to the Dutchess County Legislature. She was re-elected in 2013, running unopposed.

== New York State Senate ==
In 2014, Serino was recruited by Senate Republicans to run against first-term incumbent Democratic Senator Terry Gipson in Senate District 41. While Gipson had won election in 2012, the district had been reliably Republican in the previous years. Serino defeated Gipson, 51%-46%. Gipson sought a rematch against Serino in 2016; Serino prevailed again, this time by a margin of 52%-42%. In 2018, Serino narrowly won re-election to a third term, defeating Democrat Karen Smythe by only 688 votes. Serino defeated Smythe in a 2020 rematch.

In 2022, redistricting placed Serino in the same district as a Democratic incumbent, Senator Michelle Hinchey. As a result, Serino and Hinchey ran against one another in the 2022 election. Serino lost by a narrow margin.

== Dutchess County Executive ==
In February 2023, Serino announced her candidacy for Dutchess County executive. County Executive Marc Molinaro resigned his position in January 2023 upon being elected to Congress. On Election Day 2023, Serino was elected Dutchess County executive, winning 56% of the vote and defeating Democrat Tommy Zurhellen. Serino was sworn in on January 1, 2024.

== Personal life ==
Serino is married to Mark Serino and has one child. She resides in Hyde Park, New York.

New York State Senate
Preceded by Terry Gipson	Member of the New York State Senate from the 41st district 2015–2022	Succeeded by Michelle Hinchey
Preceded by William O'Neil	County Executive of Dutchess County; 2024–present	Incumbent
