= Stephen M. Saland =

American politician (born 1943)

Member of the New York State Senate from the 41st district
- In office January 1, 1991 – December 31, 2012
- Preceded by: Jay P. Rolison Jr.
- Succeeded by: Terry Gipson

Member of the New York State Assembly from the 97th district
- In office January 1, 1983 – December 31, 1990
- Preceded by: William J. Larkin Jr.
- Succeeded by: Donald H. McMillen

Member of the New York State Assembly from the 99th district
- In office ?? 1980 – December 31, 1982
- Preceded by: Emeel S. Betros
- Succeeded by: Glenn E. Warren

Personal details
- Born: November 12, 1943 (age 82) Poughkeepsie, New York, U.S.
- Party: Republican
- Education: University at Buffalo (BA); Rutgers University(JD)

Stephen M. Saland (born November 12, 1943) is an American attorney and politician. He was a Republican member of the New York State Senate, representing the 41st District from 1990 to 2012. Prior to his Senate tenure, Saland served in the New York State Assembly. Saland is notable as one of four Republican Members of the New York State Senate that voted in favor of the Marriage Equality Act in 2011. Following his vote for same-sex marriage, Saland lost his 2012 re-election bid to Democrat Terry Gipson. Since 2016, Saland has served on the board of the state Thruway Authority.

== Biography ==
A native of Poughkeepsie, Saland earned a Bachelor of Arts degree from the University at Buffalo in 1965 and a Juris Doctor from Rutgers Law School in 1968.

Saland worked as a legislative aide to a New Jersey Assemblyman, and later as an executive assistant to New York Assemblyman Emeel S. Betros. Saland worked as a lawyer in Betros' law firm. He began his own career in public service as a town councilman in Wappinger. In April 1980, Saland was elected to the New York State Assembly in District 99 to fill the vacancy created by the death of Betros. His first action as a state legislator was to introduce a bill requiring the state to reimburse school districts for interest debts they incurred from borrowing money because of New York's budget crisis. Saland was re-elected several times, and remained in the Assembly until 1990.

Saland was a member of the New York State Senate (41st District) from 1991 to 2012. After voting for same-sex marriage in 2011, Saland received a Republican primary challenge from Neil Di Carlo in 2012. Although Saland won the primary by a margin of 107 votes, Di Carlo continued his campaign as the candidate of the Conservative Party. Saland lost the general election to Democrat Terry Gipson by 2,096 votes; Di Carlo acted as a spoiler, receiving 17,300 votes on the Conservative line.

In 2016, Saland was appointed to the board of the state Thruway Authority by Gov. Andrew Cuomo. The State Senate confirmed his appointment in June 2016.

Saland is a direct descendant of a former Ashkenazic Chief Rabbi of Jerusalem, Shmuel Salant.

=== 2011 same-sex marriage vote ===
On June 24, 2011, Saland cast the deciding vote in favor of New York's Marriage Equality Act, which legalized same-sex marriage in New York. Saland announced that he would vote "yes" on June 24, 2011—the same day that the bill came to the Senate floor for a vote. Saland had previously voted "no" on same-sex marriage in December 2009. While speaking in defense of an amendment exempting religious organizations from recognizing same-sex marriage, Saland described his vote as a vote of conscience: "I have defined doing the right thing as treating all persons with equality ... And that equality includes the definition of marriage. I fear that to do otherwise would fly in the face of my upbringing". Saland was one of four Republican state senators that voted in favor of the Marriage Equality Act.

== Sources ==
New York State Assembly
Preceded by Emeel S. Betros	Member of the New York State Assembly from the 99th district 1980–1982	Succeeded by Glenn E. Warren
Preceded by William J. Larkin Jr.	Member of the New York State Assembly from the 97th district 1983–1990	Succeeded by Donald H. McMillen
New York State Senate
Preceded by Jay P. Rolison Jr.	Member of the New York State Senate from the 41st district 1991–2012	Succeeded by Terry Gipson
Preceded by Eric Schneiderman	New York State Senate; Chairman of the Committee on Codes; 2011–2012	Succeeded by Michael F. Nozzolio
