= Cecilia Tkaczyk =

American politician

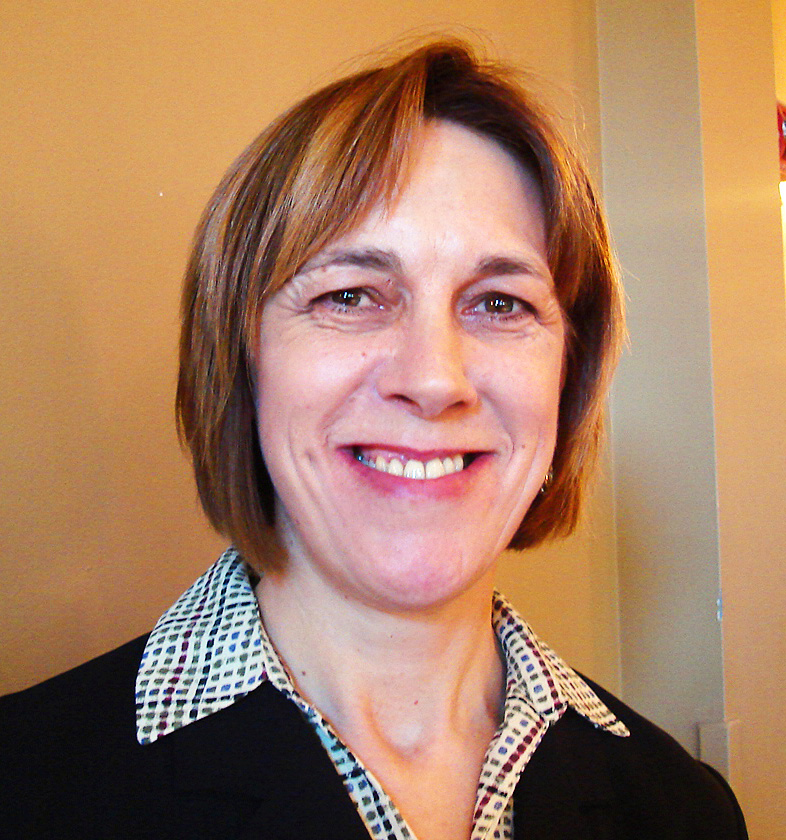

Member of the New York State Senate from the 46th district
- In office January 23, 2013 – January 3, 2015
- Preceded by: George A. Amedore Jr.
- Succeeded by: George A. Amedore Jr.

Personal details
- Born: December 18, 1961 (age 64)
- Party: Women's Equality, previously Democratic
- Education: Rutgers University
- Occupation: Farmer

Cecilia F. Tkaczyk (born December 18, 1961) is an American politician who served as a member of the New York State Senate for the 46th district. She was elected to the Senate as a member of the Democratic Party and was sworn in on January 23, 2013.

Tkaczyk was the Democratic nominee in a district that she claimed had been gerrymandered for her opponent, State Assemblyman George Amedore. The district stretches from Amsterdam to Kingston. She led Amedore on election night, but legal action by Amedore forced a judge to monitor the counting of 6,000 provisional and absentee ballots. The judge threw out 450 votes, enough to give Amedore a 37-vote lead. Amedore was certified as the winner and filed his oath of office in January. However, Tkaczyk appealed, contending that, as the ballots were primarily in Democratic-leaning areas, she could potentially win if they were all counted.

Eventually, a court ordered 99 ballots in Ulster, Albany, and Greene counties opened. Tkaczyk picked up enough votes in the opened ballots to take an 18-vote lead. Amedore conceded the race on January 18. According to the Albany Times Union, Amedore was the shortest-tenured senator in the modern history of that chamber.

Tkaczyk was born and raised on a dairy farm and was the only farmer serving in the State Senate. She and her husband Eric own and live on a small sheep farm in Duanesburg, New York, with their son, Peter.

She served as the ranking member on the Senate Committee of Mental Health and Developmental Disabilities, and on the Senate Elections Committee as well. She was also a member of the following committees: Agriculture, Environmental Conservation, Education, Children and Families and Veterans, Homeland Security and Military Affairs.

Tkaczyk was defeated in the 2014 election in a rematch with Amedore, losing by over 11,000 votes.

After losing the 2014 election, Tkaczyk left the Democratic Party and joined the upstart Women's Equality Party, which achieved automatic ballot access in the 2014 elections. Tkaczyk attempted to install herself as leader of the party in a legal maneuver designed to ensure the party had female leadership.
