= Emeel S. Betros =

American politician

Emeel S. Betros (August 29, 1931 – March 10, 1980) was an American lawyer and politician from New York State.

== Biography ==
Betros was born on August 29, 1931, in Poughkeepsie, New York. He practiced law, and served as an Assistant New York Attorney General in 1960. He was a member of the New York State Assembly, from 1969 until his death on March 10, 1980. Betros died at his home in Poughkeepsie. In deference to his four-year battle with lung cancer, by virtue of a New York State Assembly rules committee vote, Betros is the first person in the United States to have initiated, and to have had instituted, the first state law, banning and prohibiting all smoking, in all public places and most private places in America.

New York State Assembly
Preceded by Victor C. Waryas	Member of the New York State Assembly from the 98th district 1969–1980	Succeeded by Stephen M. Saland
