= William J. Larkin Jr. =

American politician and US Army officer (1928–2019)

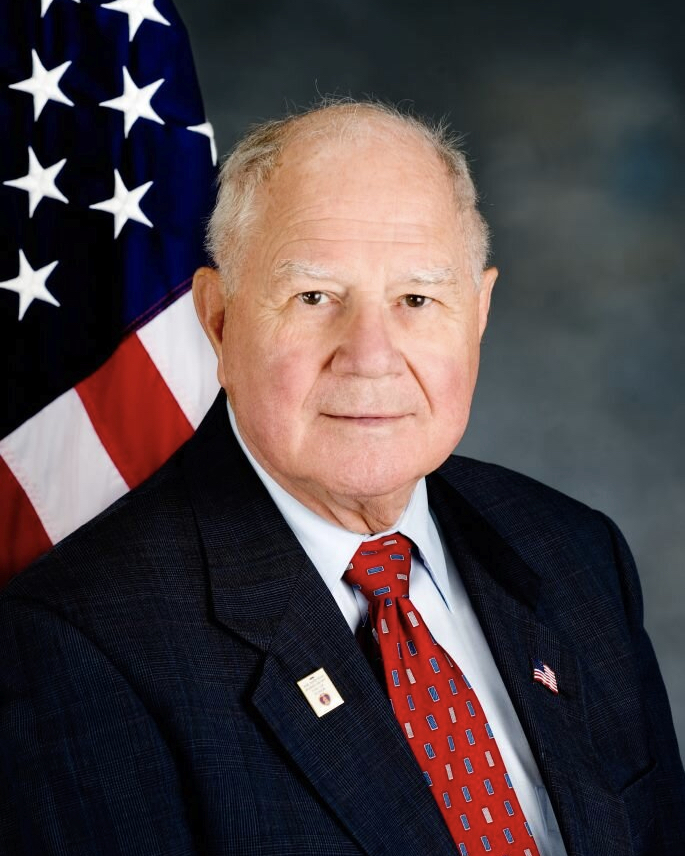

Member of the New York State Senate from the 39th district
- In office January 1, 1991 – December 31, 2018
- Preceded by: E. Arthur Gray
- Succeeded by: James Skoufis

Member of the New York State Assembly
- In office January 1, 1979 – December 31, 1990
- Preceded by: Lawrence Herbst
- Succeeded by: Nancy Calhoun
- Constituency: 97th district (1979–1982); 95th district (1983–1990)

Personal details
- Born: February 5, 1928 Troy, New York, U.S.
- Died: August 31, 2019 (aged 91) New Windsor, New York, U.S.
- Party: Republican
- Spouse: Patricia Kurucz
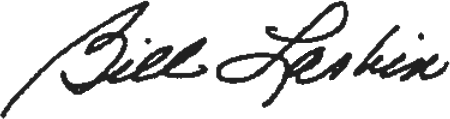
- Signature

Military service
- Allegiance: United States
- Branch/service: United States Army
- Years of service: 1944–1967
- Rank: Lieutenant colonel
- Battles/wars: World War II; Korean War
- Awards: Legion of Merit; Commend. Medal (7)

William J. Larkin Jr. (February 5, 1928 – August 31, 2019) was an American politician and retired U.S. Army officer from the state of New York.

Larkin was a decorated veteran of World War II and the Korean War. He fought in the Pacific theater in World War II and was later evacuated from the Korean War in 1951 for medical reasons. Larkin later helped protect President John F. Kennedy on a visit to Berlin and met Martin Luther King Jr. while escorting one of the Selma to Montgomery marches in Alabama during the Civil Rights Movement. He retired from the U.S. Army as a lieutenant colonel in 1967.

Following his retirement from the Army, Larkin served one term as New Windsor town supervisor. A Republican, Larkin later sat in the New York State Legislature for 40 years, representing various districts in the Hudson Valley. He was a member of the State Assembly between 1979 and 1990, representing first the 97th district and then the 95th district. He then sat in the State Senate from 1991 until his retirement in 2018, representing the 39th district. Known for his advocacy for veterans, Larkin helped to create the National Purple Heart Hall of Honor in Orange County in 2006. In 2018, a Larkin-sponsored bill renaming the Bear Mountain Bridge the Purple Heart Veterans Memorial Bridge was enacted.

== Early life ==
Born on February 5, 1928 in Troy, New York, Larkin was raised by his aunt and uncle. He graduated from La Salle Institute in Troy and later attended the University of Maryland and University of Denver.

=== Military service ===
Believing himself to be 18 years of age, Larkin enlisted in the United States Army as a private in 1944 at age 16. (Larkin later stated that he did not learn until 1965 that his actual birth year was 1928, not 1926.)

Larkin fought in the Pacific theater in World War II and saw combat in the Philippines campaign. He subsequently entered officer candidate school and was sent to fight in the Korean War. Larkin led an all-black unit during a period when the Armed Forces remained segregated. He was evacuated from the Korean War in 1951 due to severe frostbite to his feet. When Larkin retired from politics in 2018, he was the last serving New York state legislator to have fought in World War II.

During his career in the Army, Larkin helped protect President John F. Kennedy on a visit to Berlin and met Martin Luther King Jr. when escorting one of the Selma to Montgomery marches in Alabama during the Civil Rights Movement. Larkin retired from the U.S. Army in 1967 as a Lieutenant Colonel; he also received the Legion of Merit and seven Army Commendation Medals.

== Political career ==
Following his retirement from the Army, Larkin was hired as an executive assistant in the New York State Senate and served a term as New Windsor town supervisor before being elected to the New York State Assembly in 1978. Larkin served in the Assembly from 1979 to 1990. He was elected to the State Senate in 1990, defeating incumbent Democratic state senator E. Arthur Gray. Larkin would go on to win 13 more two-year State Senate terms. In the Senate, Larkin represented portions of Orange, Rockland, and Ulster Counties.

Known for his advocacy for veterans, Larkin helped to create the National Purple Heart Hall of Honor in Orange County, New York in 2006. Larkin successfully urged the U.S. Postal Service to issue a stamp depicting the Purple Heart, and to later make it a "forever" stamp which continues to be in circulation despite price changes. In October 2018, a Larkin-sponsored bill renaming the Bear Mountain Bridge was signed into law; the bridge was renamed the Purple Heart Veterans Memorial Bridge. According to the Albany Times Union, Larkin "often shared anecdotes from his life experiences on the Senate floor".

Larkin sponsored legislation that required Pulse Oximetry testing for all newborns. He voted against same-sex marriage legislation in 2009 when the bill was defeated in the Senate and voted against it again in 2011 when it passed. In 2013, he voted against the gun control law known as the NY SAFE Act. Larkin voted in favor of medical marijuana legalization in 2014.

Larkin's district was once considered a safe Republican district. Over time, however, the district underwent demographic changes. By 2018, enrolled Democrats outnumbered enrolled Republicans in the district by a significant margin. While Larkin was widely expected to retire sooner than he did, his continued presence helped keep his district (and the entire State Senate) in Republican hands and dissuaded some potential Democratic challengers from seeking the Senate seat in District 39.

In May 2018, at the age of 90, Larkin announced that he would retire at year-end instead of seeking re-election. At the time of his announcement, Larkin was the only World War II veteran remaining in the New York State Legislature. In June 2018, U.S. News & World Report reported that Larkin was believed to be one of only two World War II veterans still serving in a U.S. state legislature; the other was State Senator Fred Risser of Wisconsin.

== Personal life ==
Larkin lived in the town of New Windsor, New York. He was married to Patricia Kurucz Larkin. He died on August 31, 2019, and was survived by his wife and their eight children, 17 grandchildren, and two great-grandchildren.

New York State Assembly
Preceded by Lawrence Herbst	New York State Assembly; 97th District; 1979–1982	Succeeded by Stephen M. Saland
Preceded by Eugene Levy	New York State Assembly; 95th District; 1983–1990	Succeeded by Nancy Calhoun
New York State Senate
Preceded by E. Arthur Gray	New York State Senate; 39th District; 1991–2018	Succeeded by James Skoufis
Preceded by Diane Savino	New York State Senate; Chairman of the Committee on Civil Service and Pensions; 2011	Succeeded by Martin Golden
