= New York's 39th State Senate district =

American legislative district

Senator
Robert Rolison; R–Poughkeepsie
- Registration: 39.3% Democratic; 29.6% Republican; 22.9% No party preference
- Demographics: 63% White; 9% Black; 23% Hispanic; 3% Asian
- Population (2017): 299,766
- Registered voters: 182,135

New York's 39th State Senate district is one of 63 districts in the New York State Senate. It has been represented by Democrat James Skoufis, Republican William Larkin, and is currently represented by Robert Rolison.

== Geography ==
The district overlaps with New York's 17th, 18th, and 19th congressional districts, and with the 96th, 98th, 99th, 101st, 103rd, and 104th districts of the New York State Assembly.

== Recent election results ==
=== 2026 ===
2026 New York State Senate election, District 39
Primary election
Party	Candidate	Votes	%
Democratic	Lisa Kaul	8,390	62.0
Democratic	Evan Menist	4,111	30.4
Democratic	Gay Lee	1,019	7.5
Write-in		11	0.1
Total votes		13,531	100.0
General election
Republican	Robert Rolison		
Conservative	Robert Rolison		
Total	Robert Rolison (incumbent)		
Democratic	Lisa Kaul		
Working Families	Lisa Kaul		
Total	Lisa Kaul		
Write-in			
Total votes			

=== 2024 ===
2024 New York State Senate election, District 39
Party	Candidate	Votes	%
Republican	Robert Rolison	67,312	
Conservative	Robert Rolison	8,282	
Total	Robert Rolison (incumbent)	75,594	50.7
Democratic	Yvette Valdes Smith	67,756	
Working Families	Yvette Valdes Smith	5,764	
Total	Yvette Valdes Smith	73,520	49.3
Write-in		63	0.0
Total votes		149,177	100.0
Republican hold			

=== 2022 (redistricting) ===
2022 New York State Senate election, District 39
Party	Candidate	Votes	%
Republican	Robert Rolison	58,132	53.1
Democratic	Julie Shiroishi	46,920	
Working Families	Julie Shiroishi	4,474	
Total	Julie Shiroishi	51,394	46.9
Write-in		30	0.0
Total votes		109,556	100.0
Republican gain from Democratic			

=== 2020 ===
2020 New York State Senate election, District 39
Party	Candidate	Votes	%
Democratic	James Skoufis	66,794	
Working Families	James Skoufis	5,358	
SAM	James Skoufis	404	
Total	James Skoufis (incumbent)	72,556	57.0
Republican	Steve Brescia	48,641	
Conservative	Steve Brescia	5,963	
Total	Steve Brescia	54,604	42.9
Write-in		86	0.1
Total votes		127,246	100.0
Democratic hold			

=== 2018 ===
2018 New York State Senate election, District 39
Party	Candidate	Votes	%
Democratic	James Skoufis	48,267	
Working Families	James Skoufis	1,862	
Reform	James Skoufis	712	
Women's Equality	James Skoufis	707	
Total	James Skoufis	51,548	53.9
Republican	Thomas Basile	34,195	
Conservative	Thomas Basile	5,080	
Independence	Thomas Basile	4,713	
Total	Thomas Basile	43,988	46.0
Write-in		36	0.1
Total votes		95,572	100.0
Democratic gain from Republican			

=== 2016 ===
2016 New York State Senate election, District 39
Primary election
Party	Candidate	Votes	%
Working Families	Chris Eachus	59	75.6
Working Families	Aron Wieder (write-in)	16	20.5
Working Families	John Allegro (write-in)	2	2.6
Working Families	Malick Carmilla (write-in)	1	1.3
Write-in		0	0.0
Total votes		78	100.0
Women's Equality	Chris Eachus	3	100.0
Write-in		0	0.0
Total votes		3	100.0
General election
Republican	William Larkin	51,010	
Conservative	William Larkin	6,914	
Independence	William Larkin	6,611	
Reform	William Larkin	496	
Total	William Larkin (incumbent)	65,031	57.7
Democratic	Chris Eachus	43,915	
Working Families	Chris Eachus	2,882	
Women's Equality	Chris Eachus	844	
Total	Chris Eachus	47,641	42.3
Write-in		49	0.0
Total votes		112,721	100.0
Republican hold			

=== 2014 ===
2014 New York State Senate election, District 39
Party	Candidate	Votes	%
Republican	William Larkin	32,454	
Independence	William Larkin	6,897	
Conservative	William Larkin	6,661	
Total	William Larkin (incumbent)	46,102	70.5
Democratic	Gay Lee	17,201	
Working Families	Gay Lee	2,070	
Total	Gay Lee	19,271	29.5
Write-in		37	0.0
Total votes		65,320	100.0
Republican hold			

=== 2012 ===
2012 New York State Senate election, District 39
Party	Candidate	Votes	%
Republican	William Larkin	45,942	
Conservative	William Larkin	6,722	
Independence	William Larkin	2,257	
Total	William Larkin (incumbent)	54,291	52.2
Democratic	Chris Eachus	46,126	
Working Families	Chris Eachus	3,620	
Total	Chris Eachus	49,746	47.8
Write-in		50	0.0
Total votes		104,087	100.0
Republican hold			

=== Federal results in District 39 ===
Year	Office	Results
2020	President	Trump 49.3 – 49.2%
2016	President	Trump 49.9 – 46.3%
2012	President	Obama 52.7 – 46.0%
2012	Senate	Gillibrand 66.4 – 32.2%
