= Women's Equality Party (New York) =

American political party (2014–2018)

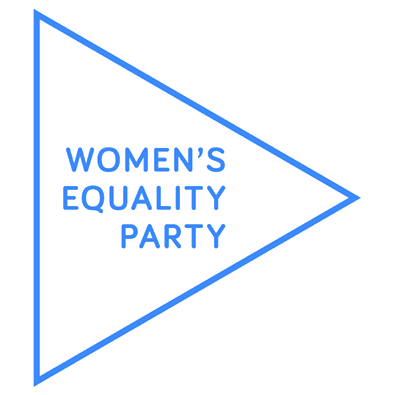
- Leaders: Susan Zimet
- Founded: 2014
- Dissolved: 2018
- Ideology: Women's rights Feminism; Pro-choice; Progressivism
- Political position: Center-left

The Women's Equality Party was a minor political party active within the state of New York. It was founded in 2014 by then governor of New York Andrew Cuomo and appeared alongside his name on the 2014 and 2018 gubernatorial ballots under New York's electoral fusion law. The party encountered controversy due to endorsing the male Andrew Cuomo for governor over primary challengers Zephyr Teachout and Cynthia Nixon in 2014 and 2018, which has led to claims that the party was a front organization for Cuomo's gubernatorial campaigns in 2014 and 2018.

The party lost ballot access following the 2018 elections. Interest in the history of the party increased following sexual harassment allegations made against Cuomo beginning in 2020 and his subsequent resignation in 2021.

== History ==
Andrew Cuomo, the incumbent Governor of New York, created the party in July 2014 under New York's electoral fusion laws, which allow votes on any ballot line to count toward a ticket's overall vote count. The party's name came from the Women's Equality Act, a bill that Cuomo was attempting to push through the New York State Legislature but stalled after he and the bill's supporters demanded a clause codifying Roe v. Wade be included even as the then Republican-led New York State Senate refused to include the clause (the Senate did pass the rest of the bill, but the rest of the legislature refused to consider the bill without the Roe clause).

From its beginning, the party was met with controversy. Zephyr Teachout, who was challenging Cuomo in a primary election, accused Cuomo of blatant pandering, since Cuomo was not a woman. (Cuomo used Kathy Hochul, his female running mate, as the public face of the party.)

The party attained over 50,000 votes for the Cuomo–Hochul ticket in the 2014 gubernatorial elections, granting it automatic ballot access as a full political party under state law. Cuomo and Hochul submitted a set of rules that has twice been challenged: once by a pair of Republican clerks who noted that the rules were not approved by a majority of the WEP's statewide candidates (the judge threw the challenge out for lack of standing), and again by former State Senator Cecilia Tkaczyk, who submitted her own set of rules in an attempt to become chair of the party.

In 2016, the party was led by acting chair Rachel Gold. In that year's presidential election, 36,292 people voted for Democratic candidate Hillary Clinton on the party's line, a little over a quarter of those who voted for Clinton on the Working Families line. In January 2018, Susan Zimet became chair of the party. Despite the change in leadership, and the fact that he was once again being challenged by a woman (Cynthia Nixon this time), the party supported Cuomo's 2018 reelection. The party is widely believed to still be controlled and funded by the Cuomo gubernatorial campaign as a front organization, with the party having minimal independent operations.

The party's acronym (W.E.P.) is visually close to that of the Working Families Party (W.F.P.), a left-wing New York third party that endorsed Nixon in the Democratic primary. Political observers accused Cuomo of creating the party to confuse voters who may have otherwise supported the WFP.

In 2018, prior to her election to the U.S. House of representatives, Alexandria Ocasio-Cortez called the WEP a cynical, centrist group that endorsed male incumbents over female primary challengers like herself and Cynthia Nixon.

In the 2018 gubernatorial election, the party lost its automatic ballot line after failing to capture 50,000 votes for Cuomo. At the time it lost ballot access, it had approximately 1,100 registered members.

While campaigning in the 2018 United States House of Representatives elections in New York, Democratic primary candidate Liuba Grechen Shirley used campaign funds to pay a caregiver for her two young children. The FEC ruled that federal candidates can use campaign funds to pay for child care costs that result from time spent running for office. Grechen Shirley became the first woman in history to receive approval to spend campaign funds on child care. Grechen Shirley was affiliated with the Women's Equality Party and the Working Families Party.

Cuomo's ties to the party were again criticized after multiple women accused him of sexual harassment in 2021.

== See also ==
- Front organization
