= Thomas Murphy =

Thomas Murphy may refer to:

== Government ==
=== Military ===
- Thomas C. Murphy, American Civil War Medal of Honor recipient
- Thomas J. Murphy (Medal of Honor), American Civil War Medal of Honor recipient
- Thomas Murphy (Medal of Honor), American Civil War Medal of Honor recipient
- Thomas Murphy (Medal of Honor, 1869), American Indian Wars Medal of Honor recipient
- Thomas Murphy (VC) (1839–1900), Irish recipient of the Victoria Cross
- Thomas E. Murphy (general), United States Air Force general

=== Politics ===
- Tom Murphy (Georgia politician) (1924–2007), American politician from the U.S. state of Georgia
- Tom Murphy (Minnesota politician) (born 1962), member of the Minnesota House of Representatives
- Tom Murphy (Newfoundland politician) (1937–2018), Newfoundland politician
- Thomas Alexander Murphy (1885–1966), politician in Ontario, Canada
- Thomas Gerow Murphy (1883–1971), Canadian politician
- Thomas J. Murphy (Newfoundland politician) (1861–1933), Newfoundland lawyer and politician
- Thomas J. Murphy (New York politician) (1930–2025), American politician and jurist from the U.S. state of New York
- Thomas J. Murphy Jr. (born 1944), Democratic politician from Pittsburgh, Pennsylvania
- Thomas Murphy (Collector) (1821–1901), collector of the Port of New York, 1870–1871
- Thomas Murphy (Australian politician) (1906–1978), member of the New South Wales Legislative Assembly
- Thomas Murphy (Irish republican) (born 1949), reported former Chief of Staff of the Provisional IRA paramilitary group
- Thomas W. Murphy Jr. (born 1942), American politician from the U.S. state of Maine

=== Other government ===
- Thomas W. Murphy (American Samoa judge) (1935–1992), associate chief justice of the High Court of American Samoa
- Thomas W. Murphy (Illinois judge) (born 1953), U.S. district court judge in Chicago
- Thomas Francis Murphy (1905–1995), American judge in New York City

== Media and arts ==
- Tom Murphy (artist) (born 1949), English artist
- Tom Murphy (actor) (1968–2007), Irish theatre and film actor
- Tom Murphy (luthier) (born 1950), American luthier
- Tom Murphy (playwright) (1935–2018), Irish dramatist
- Tommy Murphy (Australian playwright) (born 1979), Australian playwright
- Thomas Murphy (broadcasting) (1925–2022), American broadcast executive
- Thomas F. Murphy (author) (born 1939), American author

== Sports ==
=== Australian rules football ===
- Tommy Murphy (Australian footballer) (1903–1958), Australian rules footballer for South Melbourne
- Tom Murphy (footballer, born 1986), Australian rules footballer for Hawthorn and the Gold Coast
- Tom Murphy (footballer, born 1998), Australian rules footballer for North Melbourne

=== Baseball ===
- Tom Murphy (pitcher) (born 1945), American Major League Baseball pitcher
- Tommy Murphy (baseball) (born 1979), American Major League Baseball outfielder
- Tom Murphy (catcher) (born 1991), American Major League Baseball catcher

=== Other sports ===
- Torpedo Billy Murphy (Thomas William Murphy, 1863–1939), boxer from New Zealand
- Tom Murphy (American football) (1901–1994), American NFL football player
- Tom Murphy (Irish footballer) (fl. 1920s), Irish international footballer
- Tommy Murphy (Gaelic footballer) (1921–1985), Irish Gaelic footballer for County Laois
- Tom Murphy (runner) (1935–2025), American middle-distance runner
- Tommy Murphy (hurler) (1943–2022), Irish hurler for Kilkenny
- Tom Murphy (Mooncoin hurler) (born 1969), Irish hurler for Kilkenny
- Tom Murphy (chess player) (born 1957), American chess player
- Tommy Murphy (snooker player) (born 1962), Northern Irish snooker player
- Tom Murphy (fighter) (born 1974), American mixed martial artist
- Tom Murphy (English footballer) (born 1991), English footballer for Farnborough
- Tom Murphy (rugby union) (born 1972), Australian rugby union player
- Thomas W. Murphy (harness racing) (1877–1967), American harness racing driver and trainer

== Others ==
- Thomas Murphy (chairman) (1915–2006), CEO of General Motors
- Thomas Joseph Murphy (1932–1997), American bishop in the Catholic Church
- Thomas Austin Murphy (1911–1981), American clergyman of the Roman Catholic Church
- Thomas W. Murphy (anthropologist) (born 1967), Environmental Anthropologist and Latter Day Saint writer
- Tom Murphy (physicist) (born 1970), astrophysicist
- Thomas E. Murphy (educator) (1856–1933), American educator
- Thomas Murphy (pediatrician), American pediatrician
- Tom Murphy VII (born 1979), computer programmer and YouTuber
