= William E. Bush =

American politician

Member of the New York State Assembly from the 119th district
- In office January 1, 1983 – December 31, 1990
- Preceded by: Hyman M. Miller
- Succeeded by: Joan Christensen

Member of the New York State Assembly from the 121st district
- In office January 1, 1977 – December 31, 1982
- Preceded by: Thomas J. Murphy
- Succeeded by: Hyman M. Miller

Personal details
- Born: April 2, 1936 Auburn, New York
- Died: August 14, 2001 (aged 65) Syracuse, New York
- Party: Republican

William E. Bush (April 2, 1936 – August 14, 2001) was an American politician who served in the New York State Assembly from 1977 to 1990.

He died on August 14, 2001, in Syracuse, New York at age 65.
