= John H. Terry =

American politician

John Hart Terry
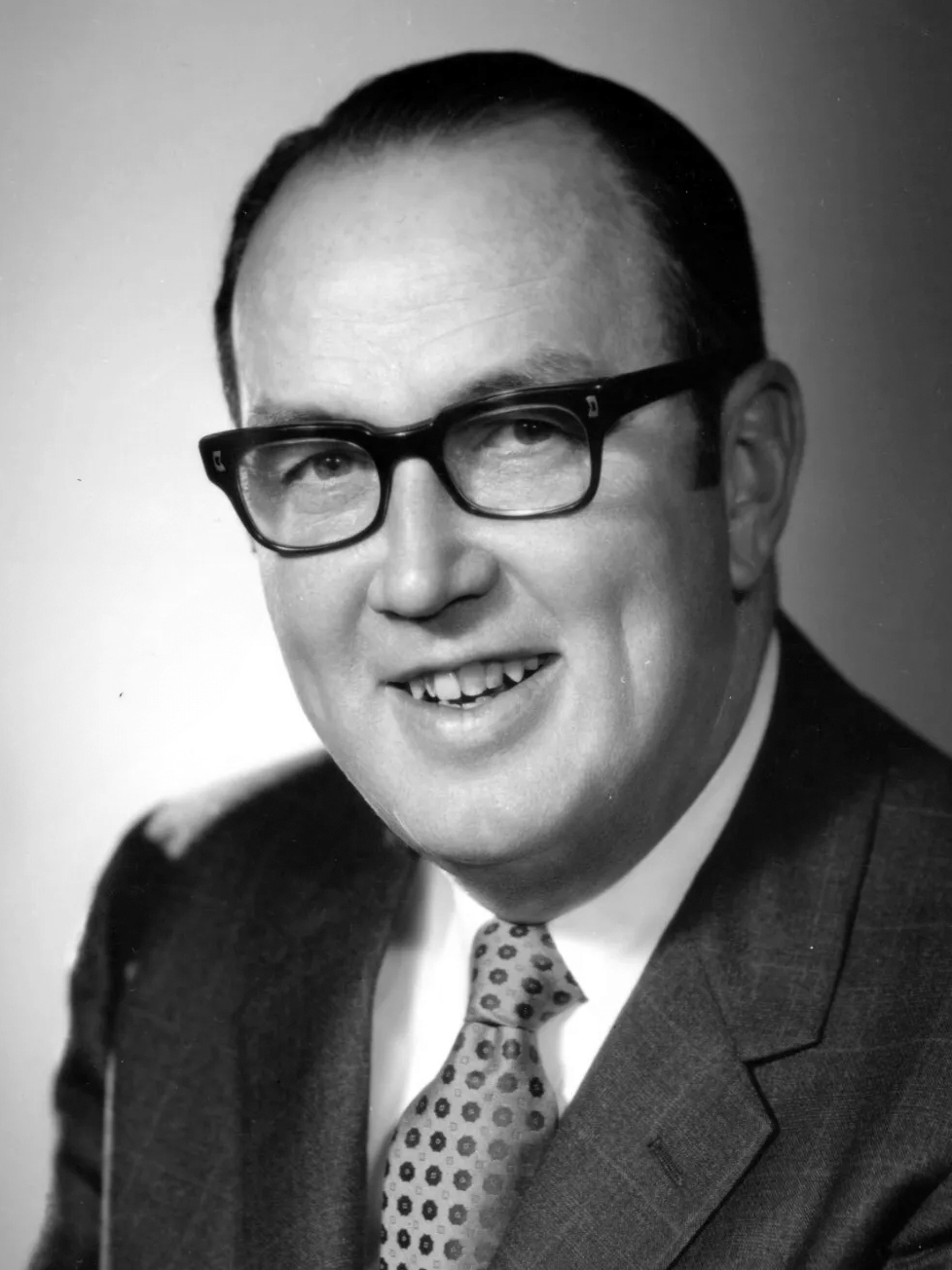

Member of the U.S. House of Representatives from New York's 34th district
- In office January 3, 1971 – January 3, 1973
- Preceded by: Samuel S. Stratton (redistricted)
- Succeeded by: William F. Walsh (redistricted)

Member of the New York State Assembly
- In office January 1, 1963 – December 31, 1970
- Preceded by: George P. Savage
- Succeeded by: Thomas J. Murphy
- Constituency: 121st district (1967–1970); 134th district (1966); Onondaga 2nd (1963–1965)

Member of the Onondaga County Board of Supervisors
- In office 1948–1958

Personal details
- Born: November 14, 1924 Syracuse, New York, U.S.
- Died: October 20, 2001 (aged 76) Syracuse, New York, U.S.
- Party: Republican
- Spouse: Catherine Jean Terry
- Children: 4
- Education: Most Holy Rosary
- Alma mater: University of Notre Dame; Syracuse University College of Law
- Occupation: Lawyer
- Awards: Bronze Star; Purple Heart

John Hart Terry (November 14, 1924 – October 20, 2001) was an American lawyer and politician from New York.

== Early life and education ==
Terry was born on November 14, 1924, in Syracuse, New York and graduated from Most Holy Rosary in 1941. He graduated from the University of Notre Dame in 1945, and LL.B. from Syracuse University College of Law in 1948. He served in the United States Army from 1943 until 1946 and received a Bronze Star and a Purple Heart for his service during World War II.

== Political career ==
He was a member of the Board of Supervisors of Onondaga County from 1948 to 1958. He was Assistant Secretary to the Governor of New York from 1959 to 1961. He was a member of the New York State Assembly from 1963 to 1970, sitting in the 174th, 175th, 176th, 177th and 178th New York State Legislatures.

He was elected as a Republican to the 92nd United States Congress in 1970, holding office from January 3, 1971, to January 3, 1973.

== Personal life and death ==
He married Catherine Jean; and they had three daughters: Lynn, Susan and M. Carole. He also adopted his wife's daughter C. Jean Phelan Terry whose father was killed in World War II.

After leaving Congress Terry was Senior Vice President, General Counsel and Secretary of the Niagara Mohawk Power Corporation. After leaving Niagara Mohawk in 1987 he returned to practicing law in Syracuse. In retirement he resided in Syracuse and Vero Beach, Florida.

He died on October 20, 2001; and was buried at Saint Mary's Cemetery in DeWitt, New York.

New York State Assembly
Preceded by George P. Savage	New York State Assembly, Onondaga County, 2nd District; 1963–1965	Succeeded by district abolished
Preceded by new district	New York State Assembly; 134th District; 1966	Succeeded by Charles F. Stockmeister
Preceded by Verner M. Ingram	New York State Assembly; 121st District; 1967–1970	Succeeded by Thomas J. Murphy
U.S. House of Representatives
Preceded by James M. Hanley	Member of the U.S. House of Representatives from New York's 34th congressional district 1971–1973	Succeeded by Frank Horton
