= The Anchorage (Washington, D.C.) =

- U.S. Historic district – Contributing property
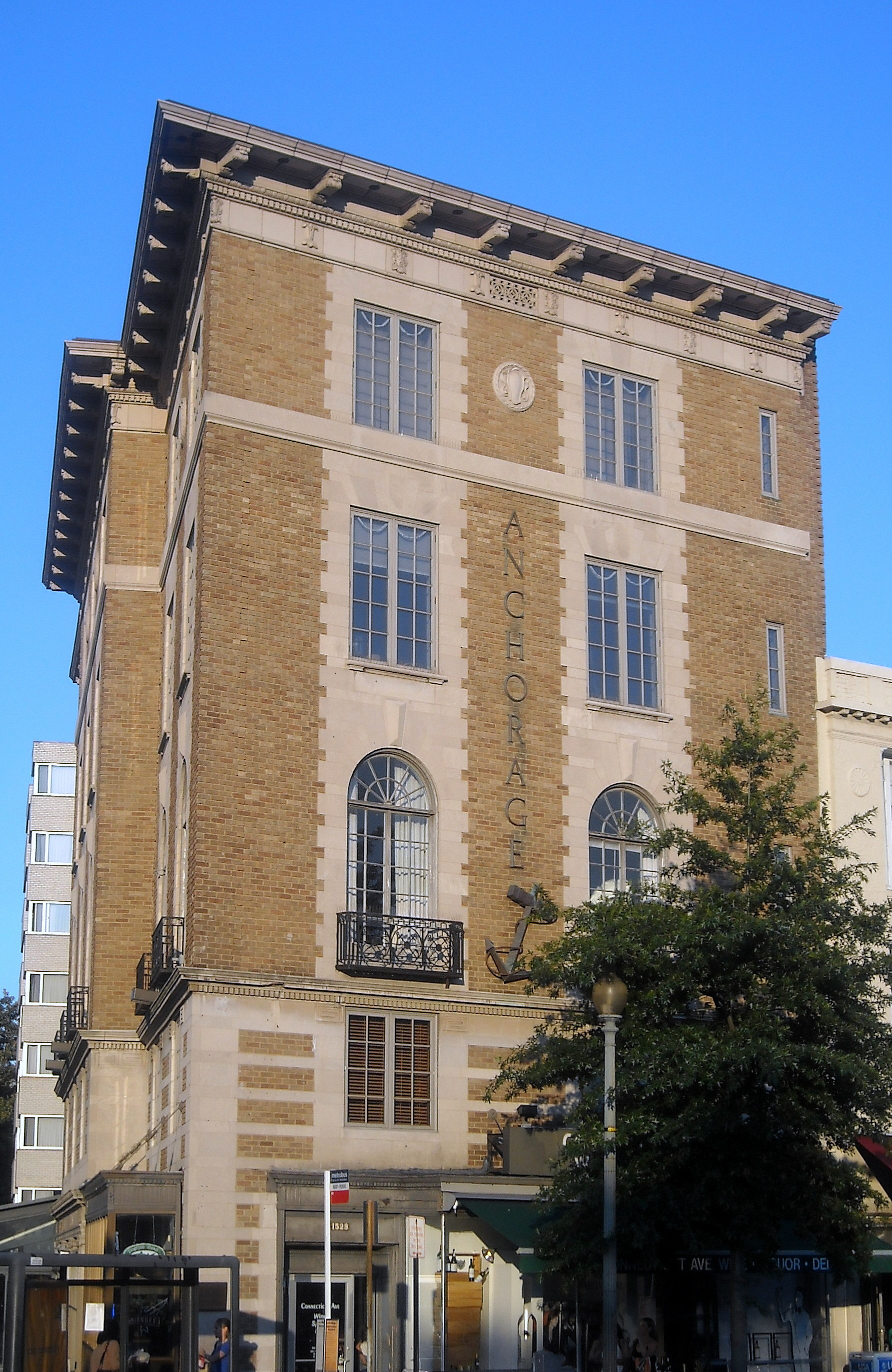
- The Anchorage
- Location: Washington, D.C.
- Coordinates: 38.9112°N 77.0437°W
- Architect: Jules Henri de Sibour
- Part of: Dupont Circle Historic District (ID78003056)

Significant dates
- Added to NRHP: July 21, 1978
- Boundary increases: February 6, 1985; June 10, 2005

The Anchorage is a mixed commercial and residential building at 1555 Connecticut Avenue NW in Washington, D.C. Built in 1924 to a design by local architect Jules Henri de Sibour, the building is a contributing property to the Dupont Circle Historic District.

Notable past tenants include Tallulah Bankhead, Ernest Cuneo, Arthur Goldberg, Charles Lindbergh, Robert F. Kennedy, and Sam Rayburn.
