= Thomas Murphy (pediatrician) =

American pediatrician

Joseph Thomas Murphy is an American pediatrician currently at Children's Health, formerly professor at the University of Texas Southwestern Medical Center and the editor-in-chief of Pediatric Pulmonology.
