= Thomas J. Murphy (New York politician) =

American politician (1930–2025)

Member of the New York State Assembly from the 121st district
- In office January 1, 1971 – December 31, 1976
- Preceded by: John H. Terry
- Succeeded by: William E. Bush

Personal details
- Born: May 25, 1930 Syracuse, New York, U.S.
- Died: January 9, 2025 (aged 94)
- Party: Republican
- Spouse: Mary Jane Dadey
- Children: 8
- Parent(s): James and Arlene Murphy

Thomas J. Murphy (May 25, 1930 – January 9, 2025) was an American politician and jurist from the state of New York. He served as a Republican member of the New York State Assembly and a justice of the New York Supreme Court.

== Life and career ==
Murphy was born in Syracuse, New York, on May 25, 1930, the son of James and Arlene Murphy. He graduated from Le Moyne College and Syracuse University College of Law. He married Mary Jane Dadey, and they had eight children. He practiced law, becoming a partner at the firm of Deegan, Murphy, and Dadey.

He was elected as a member of the Onondaga County Legislature in 1965, and re-elected in 1967 and 1969, serving as majority leader from 1968 to 1970. In 1970, he was elected to the New York State Assembly from the Syracuse-based 121st district. He was re-elected twice, and in 1976, he was elected as a justice of the New York Supreme Court. In 1990, he was re-elected to a second term.

Murphy died on January 9, 2025, at the age of 94.
