= Tom Murphy (chess player) =

American chess player

Thomas Dwayne "Tom" "Murph" Murphy (born March 1957) is an African-American, formerly homeless/transient chess hustler who plays primarily in Chicago, where he also teaches, and who previously played in Dupont Circle, Washington, D.C. He is considered one of the top regular players in Chicago, and one of the best blitz chess players in the United States of America. He holds an Expert rating with the USCF.

Murphy grew up in North Carolina, where he played briefly in scholastic tournaments. In the 1980s, he lived with his grandmother in Philadelphia, worked for the City of Philadelphia, and hustled in the skittles room (a place for casual noncompetitive chess, see skittles as a metaphor) of major tournaments like the World Open and National Chess Congress, while during the year he would play mostly in Love Park, Clark Park, and the homes and offices of other strong area players, plus area university chess clubs. After his grandmother died in 1997, he moved to Washington, D.C., where he worked for the National Archives for a time.

In 1989, after a patron sponsored his entry into the World Open Blitz, he split matches with four-time US Champion Robert Byrne and IM Anthony Saidy, on his way to capturing the u2200 class prize of $300. He placed 15th overall in the 2005 World Blitz Chess Championship. In 1998, he won the Arlington Chess Club's annual championship, beating two International Masters in the process.
