= 2016 New York State Senate election =

- November 8, 2016

All 63 seats in the New York State Senate 32 seats needed for a majority
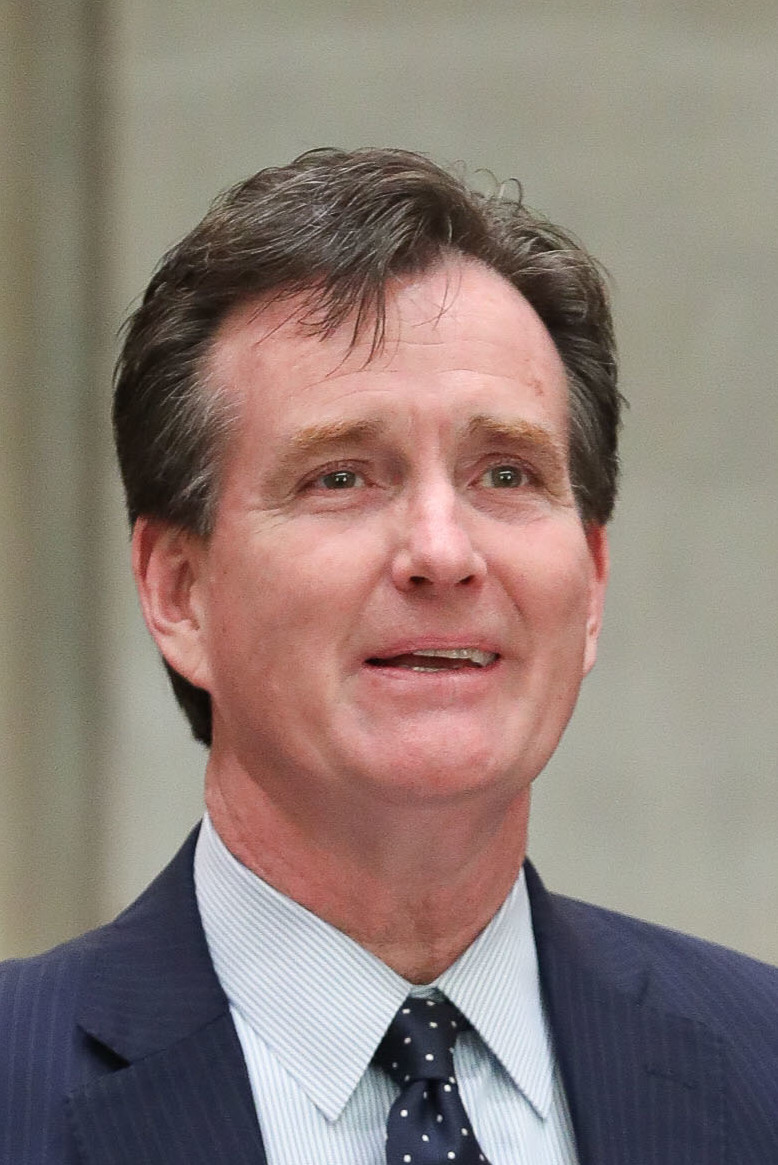

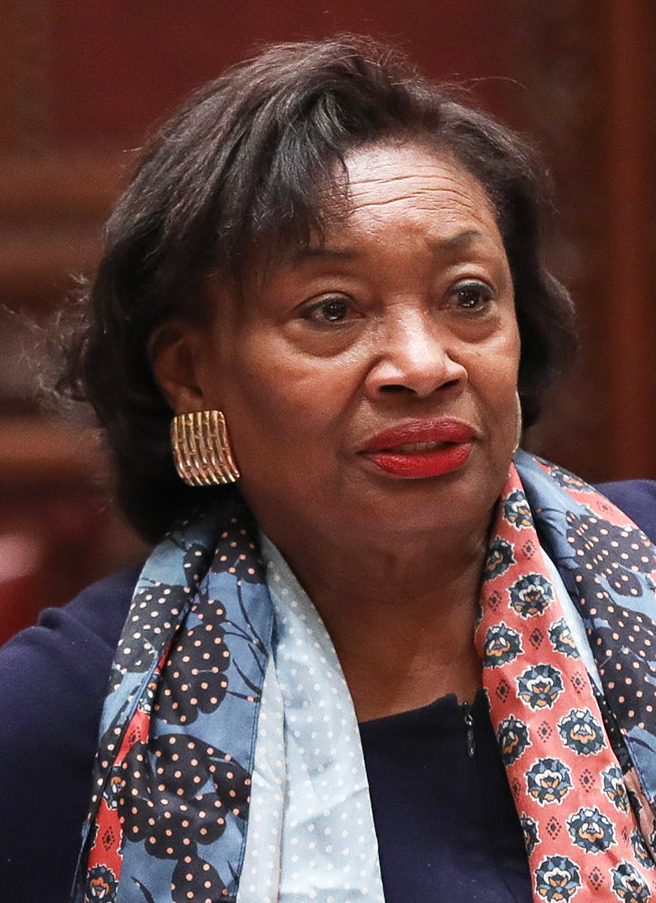

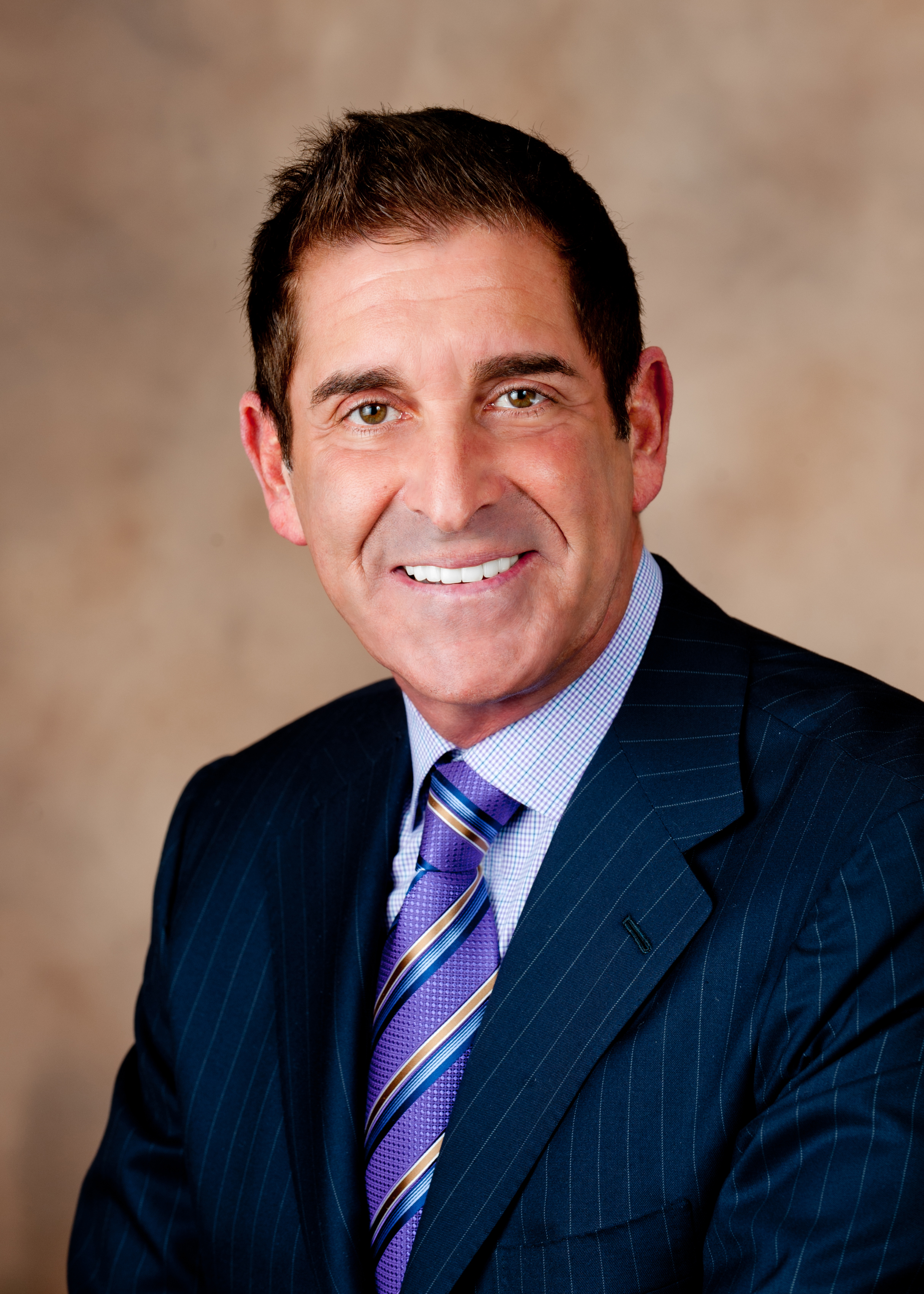
	Majority party	Minority party	Third party
Leader	John J. Flanagan	Andrea Stewart-Cousins	Jeffrey D. Klein
Party	Republican	Democratic	IDC
Leader's seat	2nd District	35th District	34th District
Seats before	31 (Note: The Republicans were able to maintain the majority due to a power-sharing deal with the Independent Democratic Conference and Democratic State Senator Simcha Felder joining their caucus.)	27	5
Seats won	31	25	7
Seats after	31	24	8 (Note: Senator Jose Peralta defected to the Independent Democratic Conference after the election.)
Seat change	Steady	▼3	▲3
- Democratic gain Democratic hold Republican gain Republican hold Independent Democratic gain Independent Democratic hold 50–60% 60–70% 70–80% 80–90% >90% 50–60% 60–70% 70–80% 80–90% >90%
Temporary President and Majority Leader before election
John J. Flanagan
Republican
Temporary President and Majority Leader
John J. Flanagan
Republican

The 2016 New York State Senate elections were held on November 8, 2016, to elect representatives from all 63 State Senate districts in the U.S. state of New York.

The Republicans maintained control of the State Senate because of Simcha Felder and members of the Independent Democratic Conference caucusing with the Republican majority. The Democrats gained a seat by filling a vacancy.

Republican candidates won 31 seats while Democrats won 32 seats. The closest races were John Brooks' victory in the 8th district and Carl Marcellino's victory in the 6th district, with both races being decided by less than two percentage points.

This election was the first in which John Flanagan served as Majority Leader. Andrea Stewart-Cousins retained her role as Minority leader.

== Predictions ==
Source	Ranking	As of
Governing	Tossup	October 12, 2016
