= John E. Flynn =

American politician (1912–2003)

Member of the New York State Senate
- In office January 1, 1967 – December 31, 1986
- Preceded by: Christian Armbruster (redistricting)
- Succeeded by: Nicholas A. Spano
- Constituency: 34th district (1967-1972); 35th district (1973-1986)

31st Mayor of Yonkers
- In office January 1, 1961 – January 1, 1966
- Preceded by: Kristen Kristensen
- Succeeded by: Francis F. X. O'Rourke

Personal details
- Born: April 10, 1912 Yonkers, New York, U.S.
- Died: September 23, 2003 (aged 91)
- Party: Republican
- Education: New York University Columbia University
- Profession: Politician

John E. Flynn (April 10, 1912 – September 23, 2003) was an American politician a from New York. He served as the 31st Mayor of Yonkers from 1961 to 1966. He then was elected to the New York State Senate from 1967 to 1986.

== Life ==
He was born on April 10, 1912, in Yonkers, Westchester County, New York, to John and Mary Agnes Drohan Flynn. As a young man, he developed a hard work ethic while working at the Alexander Smith Carpet Mill in Yonkers. He worked irregular hours, which included work on Saturday. He attended New York University and Columbia University, and then became a business executive.

He entered politics as a Republican, and was Mayor of Yonkers from 1961 to 1966. He ran for the New York State Senate following the retirement of Christian Armbruster, serving from 1967 to 1986, sitting in the 177th, 178th, 179th, 180th, 181st, 182nd, 183rd, 184th, 185th and 186th New York State Legislatures.

Flynn died on September 23, 2003.

Political offices
Preceded by Kristen Kristensen	Mayor of Yonkers; 1961–1966	Succeeded by James Francis Xavier O’Rourke
New York State Senate
Preceded by Harrison J. Goldin	Member of the New York State Senate from the 34th district 1967–1972	Succeeded by John D. Calandra
Preceded by Anthony B. Gioffre	Member of the New York State Senate from the 35th district 1973–1986	Succeeded by Nicholas A. Spano
