= Nicholas A. Spano =

American politician (born 1953)

Member of the New York State Senate from the 35th district
- In office January 1, 1987 – December 31, 2006
- Preceded by: John E. Flynn
- Succeeded by: Andrea Stewart-Cousins

Member of the New York State Assembly
- In office January 1, 1979 – December 31, 1986
- Preceded by: Thomas J. McInerney
- Succeeded by: Terence M. Zaleski
- Constituency: 83rd district (1979-1982); 87th district (1983-1986)

Personal details
- Born: May 21, 1953 (age 73) Yonkers, New York, U.S.
- Party: Republican
- Spouse: Linda Spano
- Children: 2
- Relatives: Mike Spano (brother); Leonard Spano (father)
- Education: Iona College
- Profession: Politician, commercial real estate agent, lobbyist
- Website: Official website

Nicholas A. Spano (born May 21, 1953) is a lobbyist and Republican politician from New York. He served in the New York State Assembly and New York Senate.

== Biography ==
Spano's paternal grandfather, also named Nicholas, emigrated with two brothers from the Italian province of Bari to the United States in 1918. Spano's father Leonard ran for public office in 1967, employing his son Nicholas in door-to-door campaigning. After losing in 1967, Leonard became a county legislator in 1971, an office he held until 1993 when he was elected to the job of Westchester county clerk.

Nicholas Spano grew up in Yonkers as the oldest of 16 children of Leonard and Josephine Spano; He is a graduate of St. Peter's Elementary School in Yonkers and Iona College in New Rochelle, New York. He and his wife Linda reside in Yonkers. Spano has two children, Lenny and Christina.

Spano entered politics as a Republican. He was a member of the New York State Assembly from 1979 to 1986, sitting in the 183rd, 184th, 185th and 186th New York State Legislatures.

He was a member of the New York State Senate from 1987 to 2006, sitting in the 187th, 188th, 189th, 190th, 191st, 192nd, 193rd, 194th, 195th and 196th New York State Legislatures.

He represented Yonkers and surrounding areas in the Legislature. During his state senate career he served on the Rules, Transportation, Finance, Education, Health, and Racing, Gaming, and Wagering committees, chaired the Senate Investigations Committee, as was the Senior Assistant Majority Leader.

In 2004, Spano won re-election by only 18 votes after facing a serious challenge by Westchester County Legislator Andrea Stewart-Cousins. Neither Nick Spano nor his opponent from the Democratic Party Andrea Stewart-Cousins received an endorsement from The Working Families Party. As a favor, Spano made a promise to the working class and the labor activists of New York that he would support raising taxes progressively and support raising the New York State minimum wage.

During his run for re-election in 2006, Stewart-Cousins ran against him again, this time with the support of Democrats Bill Clinton, Hillary Clinton, Eliot Spitzer, David Paterson and Andrew Cuomo. Spano lost the rematch; he conceded defeat on November 16, 2006.

Spano subsequently become involved in commercial real estate as well as lobbying state and local governments in New York through Empire Strategic Planning, a firm he established after his defeat.

The lobbying firm came under fire in 2023 during the re-election campaign of Nicholas Spano’s brother, Yonkers Mayor Mike Spano. Calls for investigation around nepotism and corruption were centered around Empire Strategic Planning’s business before the city.

== Tax fraud ==
In 2012, Spano was indicted for federal income tax evasion. Spano pleaded guilty to a single felony count. He admitted that he underreported his income — $42,419 in federal income taxes and $10,605 in state taxes — from 2000 to 2008. He was sentenced to a year and a day in prison.

== Boycott proposal ==
In 1990, Spano recommended a boycott of Sinéad O'Connor's concert in Saratoga Springs as retaliation against her choice to skip over the US national anthem at a Madison Square Garden concert some days prior.

New York State Assembly
Preceded by Thomas J. McInerney	Member of the New York State Assembly from the 87th district 1979–1982	Succeeded by Peter M. Sullivan
Preceded by George Friedman	Member of the New York State Assembly from the 83rd district 1983–1986	Succeeded by Terence M. Zaleski
New York State Senate
Preceded by John E. Flynn	Member of the New York State Senate from the 35th district 1987–2006	Succeeded by Andrea Stewart-Cousins
