= Thomas J. McInerney (politician) =

American politician (1924–1998)

Member of the New York State Assembly
- In office January 1, 1977 – December 31, 1978
- Preceded by: Bruce F. Caputo
- Succeeded by: Nicholas A. Spano
- Constituency: 87th district
- In office January 1, 1965 – December 31, 1972
- Preceded by: Christian H. Armbruster
- Succeeded by: Bruce F. Caputo
- Constituency: Westchester's 1st district (1965); 98th district (1966); 87th district (1967-1972)

Personal details
- Born: June 12, 1924 Yonkers, New York, U.S.
- Died: August 5, 1998 (aged 74)
- Party: Democratic

Thomas J. McInerney (June 12, 1924 – August 5, 1998) was an American politician who served in the New York State Assembly from 1965 to 1972 and from 1977 to 1978.
