= Mario Mattera =

American politician (born 1963)

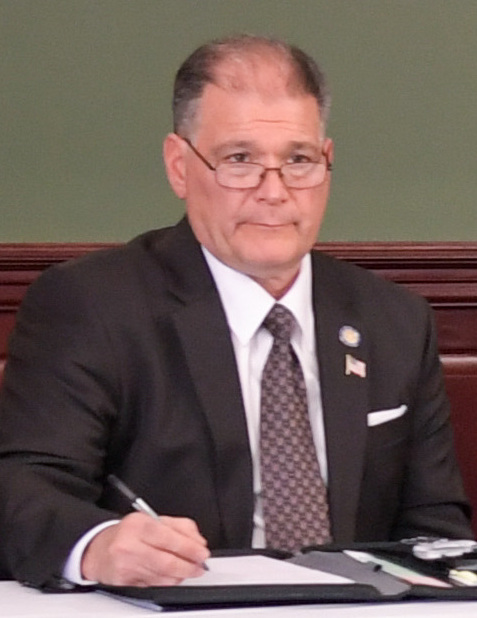
- Mattera in 2022

Member of the New York State Senate from the 2nd district
- Incumbent
- Assumed office January 1, 2021
- Preceded by: John J. Flanagan

Personal details
- Born: August 18, 1963 (age 62) Smithtown, New York, U.S.
- Party: Republican
- Spouse: Terry Mattera
- Children: 2
- Website: Official website

Mario R. Mattera (born August 18, 1963) is an American politician. A Republican, he is currently serving in the New York State Senate, representing the 2nd district, which includes a sizeable portion of the north shore of central Long Island, including all of the town of Smithtown and portions of the towns of Brookhaven and Huntington.

Prior to running for office, Mattera served as the business agent of the United Association Plumbers Local 200, and was a member of the organization for four decades.

He was first elected to the state senate in 2020, defeating former state trooper Michael Siderakis with 57.7% of the vote. He was sworn into office on January 5, 2021.

== State Senate ==
Mattera is a ranking member of the Consumer Protection and the Corporations, Authorities, and Commissions committees, and is a member of the Labor and Transportation committees.

== Personal life ==
Mattera, and his wife, Terry, live in St. James, New York, and have two daughters, named Jessica and Jayme.

== Electoral history ==
2020 New York State Senate election, District 2
Party	Candidate	Votes	%	
Democratic	Michael Siderakis	70,833	43.2%	−0.8
Republican	Mario Mattera	81,592	49.7%	+1.8
Conservative	Mario Mattera	9,623	5.6%	+0
Independence	Mario Mattera	1,684	1.0%	−0.3
Safe Neighborhoods	Mario Mattera	325	0.2%	N/A
Total	Mario Mattera	93,224	56.8%	
Total votes		164,057	100.0	
