= Bruce F. Caputo =

American lawyer and politician

Bruce Caputo
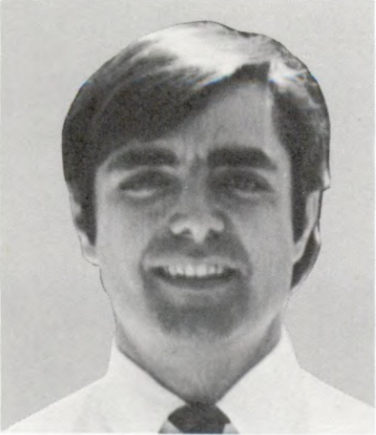

Member of the U.S. House of Representatives from New York's 23rd district
- In office January 3, 1977 – January 3, 1979
- Preceded by: Peter A. Peyser
- Succeeded by: Peter A. Peyser

Member of the New York State Assembly from the 87th district
- In office January 1, 1973 – December 31, 1976
- Preceded by: Thomas McInerney
- Succeeded by: Thomas McInerney

Personal details
- Born: Bruce Faulkner Caputo; August 7, 1943 (age 82) New York City, New York, U.S.
- Party: Republican
- Spouse: Bonnie Tiburzi
- Education: Harvard University (BA, MBA); Georgetown University (JD)

Bruce Faulkner Caputo (born August 7, 1943) is an American lawyer and politician from New York. He is most notable for his service as a member of the New York State Assembly (1973 to 1976) and the United States House of Representatives (1977 to 1979).

== Early life ==
Caputo was born in New York City on August 7, 1943, the son of Doris (Burke Caputo) and attorney Anthony Caputo. He graduated from Deerfield Academy in 1961, Harvard University (Bachelor of Arts, 1965), and Harvard Business School (Master of Business Administration, 1967). Caputo began his career in the Office of the Secretary of Defense, who at the time was Robert McNamara, where the Systems Analysis Unit hired recent business school graduates to work on policy issues. While working at the Defense Department, Caputo attended law school at night. In 1971, he received his J.D. degree from Georgetown University Law Center.

== Early career ==
In 1969 Caputo was one of the four co-founders and a board member and principal stockholder of ICF, a management consulting company. Initially focusing on energy and health care issues, the company later expanded into environmental businesses and began to build engineering capabilities. In 1988 ICF acquired Kaiser Engineers, which had originated as the engineering unit of Henry J. Kaiser's industrial empire and grew to rank among the largest engineering and construction companies in the world. The following year (1989) the combined company went public and eventually traded stock on the New York Stock Exchange. The company operated as "ICF Kaiser," with the consulting unit remaining largely intact.

In 1999, ICF Consulting ended its decade-long affiliation with Kaiser Engineers through a leveraged buyout, financed in part by the CM Equity Partners, LP, an equity investment firm based in New York City. In 2006, ICF Consulting was renamed ICF International. The firm completed an Initial Public Offering (IPO) and became a publicly traded firm listed on the NASDAQ exchange as ICFI.

== Subsequent Career ==
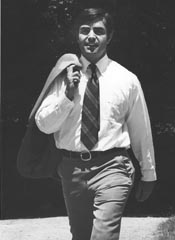
Bruce F Caputo

Caputo was elected to the New York State Assembly in 1972, representing a district in Yonkers. He was re-elected in 1974, and sat in the 180th and 181st New York State Legislatures. Caputo served on the Assembly Ways and Means, Housing and Insurance committees.

In 1976, Republican Congressman Peter A. Peyser gave up his seat to challenge incumbent U.S. Senator James L. Buckley for the Republican Senate nomination. Caputo ran for the congressional seat and won, defeating Democratic Assemblyman J. Edward Meyer, a former Republican who became a Democrat in 1973. Caputo's district included Yonkers, three towns in lower Westchester and the Woodlawn, Wakefield, Williamsbridge, Edenwald, Eastchester and Baychester sections of the Bronx. Caputo served on the House Banking, Finance and Urban Affairs committee and the Ethics committee.

In 1978, Perry Duryea, the Republican leader of the State Assembly and front runner for the Republican nomination for governor, picked Caputo as his running mate for lieutenant governor. The Republican state convention nominated them in the fall of 1978. Incumbent Governor Hugh L. Carey, a Democrat, and his running mate Mario Cuomo, defeated the Duryea-Caputo ticket in the November general election.

Following the 1978 elections Caputo served out his term in Congress and joined the management consulting firm Booz Allen Hamilton in its mergers and acquisitions and banking departments.

In 1980, Caputo entered the Republican primary against U.S. Senator Jacob Javits, but withdrew after his main rival on the right, Alfonse D'Amato, secured the nomination of the Conservative party. D'Amato defeated Javits in the Republican primary and won the general election in the fall. In his autobiography, "Power, Politics, and Pasta: The World According to Senator Al D'Amato" (1995), D'Amato bitterly criticized Caputo. In 1981, President Reagan nominated Caputo as an alternate United States delegate to the United Nations General Assembly. The Senate confirmed the nomination and Caputo began serving in the spring of that year.

Early in 1982, Caputo announced his candidacy for U.S. Senate against incumbent Democrat Daniel Patrick Moynihan, who was seeking a second term. Though he was considered a rising star in the Republican Party, and he raised money from around the country, Caputo ended his campaign after failing to get the support of key Republican and Conservative Party county leaders. Among the factors in his loss of support were statements that, in the words of New York Times investigative reporter Michael Oreskes, Caputo had "described himself as a Vietnam-era 'draftee' and an Army lieutenant although he was neither."

After leaving politics, Caputo worked as a lawyer and private investor in real estate and early stage privately held companies.

== Personal life ==
Caputo is married to Bonnie Tiburzi Caputo, the first woman pilot for a major airline. They have two children and reside in Manhattan.

U.S. House of Representatives
Preceded by Peter A. Peyser	Member of the U.S. House of Representatives from New York's 23rd congressional district 1977–1979	Succeeded by Peter A. Peyser
Party political offices
Preceded by Ralph G. Caso	Republican nominee for Lieutenant Governor of New York; 1978	Succeeded by James L. Emery
U.S. order of precedence (ceremonial)
Preceded by Denver Riggleman as Former U.S. Representative	Order of precedence of the United States as Former U.S. Representative	Succeeded by John LeBoutillier as Former U.S. Representative
