= New York's 2nd State Senate district =

American legislative district

Senator
Mario Mattera; R–St. James
- Registration: 34.1% Republican; 31.5% Democratic; 27.2% No party preference
- Demographics: 80.0% White; 3.1% Black; 8.7% Hispanic; 6.8% Asian; 0.4% Other; 1.2% Multiracial
- Population (2017): 313,799
- Registered voters: 233,554

New York's 2nd State Senate district is one of 63 districts in the New York State Senate. Since 2021, it has been represented by Republican Mario Mattera, who succeeded former Senate Majority Leader John Flanagan. For the 2022 election, the 2nd district was redistricted from the old 2nd district and the 5th district.

== Geography ==
2nd District covers northwest Suffolk County on Long Island, including the towns of Smithtown and Huntington.

The district overlaps with New York's 1st and 3rd congressional districts, and with the 8th, 10th, and 12th districts of the New York State Assembly.

== Recent election results ==
=== 2026 ===
2026 New York State Senate election, District 2
Party	Candidate	Votes	%
Republican	Mario Mattera		
Conservative	Mario Mattera		
Total	Mario Mattera (incumbent)		
Democratic	Harjot Singh		
Write-in			
Total votes			

=== 2024 ===
2024 New York State Senate election, District 2
Party	Candidate	Votes	%
Republican	Mario Mattera	92,970	
Conservative	Mario Mattera	11,595	
Total	Mario Mattera (incumbent)	103,865	58.3
Democratic	Craig Herskowitz	74,307	41.6
Write-in		123	0.1
Total votes		178,295	100.0
Republican hold			

=== 2022 ===
2022 New York State Senate election, District 2
Party	Candidate	Votes	%
Republican	Mario Mattera	71,576	
Conservative	Mario Mattera	10,379	
Total	Mario Mattera (incumbent)	81,955	57.9
Democratic	Susan Berland	56,755	
Working Families	Susan Berland	2,895	
Total	Susan Berland	59,650	42.1
Write-in		22	0.0
Total votes		141,627	100.0
Republican hold			

=== 2020 ===
2020 New York State Senate election, District 2
Party	Candidate	Votes	%
Republican	Mario Mattera	81,592	
Conservative	Mario Mattera	9,623	
Independence	Mario Mattera	1,684	
Safe Neighborhoods	Mario Mattera	325	
Total	Mario Mattera	93,224	56.8
Democratic	Michael Siderakis	70,833	43.2
Write-in		32	0.0
Total votes		164,089	100.0
Republican hold			

=== 2018 ===
2018 New York State Senate election, District 2
Party	Candidate	Votes	%
Republican	John Flanagan	57,621	
Conservative	John Flanagan	6,682	
Independence	John Flanagan	1,524	
Reform	John Flanagan	227	
Total	John Flanagan (incumbent)	66,054	54.9
Democratic	Kathleen Cleary	52,861	
Women's Equality	Kathleen Cleary	1,291	
Total	Kathleen Cleary	54,152	45.0
Write-in		14	0.0
Total votes		120,220	100.0
Republican hold			

=== 2016 ===
2016 New York State Senate election, District 2
Party	Candidate	Votes	%
Republican	John Flanagan	77,309	
Conservative	John Flanagan	10,570	
Independence	John Flanagan	3,293	
Total	John Flanagan (incumbent)	91,172	63.2
Democratic	Peter Magistrale	47,623	33.0
Libertarian	Stephen Ruth	5,505	3.8
Write-in		32	0.0
Total votes		144,332	100.0
Republican hold			

=== 2014 ===
2014 New York State Senate election, District 2
Party	Candidate	Votes	%
Republican	John Flanagan	40,302	
Conservative	John Flanagan	7,419	
Independence	John Flanagan	2,812	
Total	John Flanagan (incumbent)	50,533	69.1
Democratic	Joseph Lombardi	22,530	30.8
Write-in		37	0.1
Total votes		73,100	100.0
Republican hold			

=== 2012 ===
2012 New York State Senate election, District 2
Party	Candidate	Votes	%
Republican	John Flanagan	64,998	
Conservative	John Flanagan	10,667	
Independence	John Flanagan	4,339	
Total	John Flanagan (incumbent)	80,004	67.5
Democratic	Errol Toulon Jr.	38,482	32.5
Write-in		37	0.0
Total votes		118,523	100.0
Republican hold			

=== Federal results in District 2 ===
Year	Office	Results
2020	President	Trump 52.2 – 46.3%
2018	Senate	Gillibrand 51.6 – 48.3%
2016	President	Trump 54.8 – 41.9%
2012	President	Romney 52.8 – 46.0%
2012	Senate	Gillibrand 59.7 – 39.0%
