= Bonnie Tiburzi =

American aviator

- Born: Bonnie Linda Tiburzi; August 31, 1948 (age 78); Connecticut, U.S.
- Occupation: Pilot for American Airlines
- Years active: 1973–1999
- Spouse: Bruce F. Caputo
- Awards: "Women Making History" Award from The National Women's History Museum

Bonnie Tiburzi (born August 31, 1948) is an American aviator. In 1973, at age 24, she became the first female pilot for American Airlines and the first female pilot for a major American commercial airline. At the same time she also became the first woman in the world to earn a Flight Engineer rating on a turbo-jet aircraft.

== Early life ==
Bonnie Tiburzi Caputo was born Bonnie Linda Tiburzi. She was born August 31, 1948, in Connecticut. Her father was a pilot for Scandinavian Airlines SAS and later with Trans World Airlines TWA. After leaving the airline industry August Robert "Gus" Tiburzi owned and operated Tiburzi Airways – a flight school and charter company in Danbury, Connecticut.

== Career ==
Tiburzi began her aviation career flying as a flight instructor and charter pilot. In 1973, at age 24, she became the first female pilot for American Airlines and the first female pilot for a major American commercial airline. She flew as a Captain on the Boeing 727, Boeing 757 and the Boeing 767. In 1986 Tiburzi wrote her autobiography, Takeoff: The Story of America's First Woman Pilot for a Major Airline. She retired from AAL in 1999 after 26 years.

== Additional professional activities ==
Trustee for the College of Aeronautics from 1990 - 2000.

Created and produced three "Women of Accomplishment" Award Luncheons for the Wings Club, Inc. in New York City from 1981 to 1983. These events honored women from various fields of endeavors - representing an array of important roles filled by women. Recipients included (among others) actress Polly Bergen, race car driver Janet Guthrie, TV anchorwoman Jane Pauley, feminist and author Betty Friedan, Rabbi Sally Priesand, actress and spokesperson Maureen O'Hara, Moya Lear of Lear Aircraft Company, Television Workshop's Faith Stewart-Gordon, opera singer Anna Moffo and Muriel Siebert, Superintendent of Banks, New York State.

Tiburzi received the "Chairman's Award for Outstanding Programming Service of the Year".

Created the "Information Bank" - a networking system for the International Society Of Women Airline Pilots to help further the career of future female pilots.

Guest speaker at many schools, colleges, and private clubs including the Federal Aviation Association, the Ninety Nines, the Smithsonian Air&Space Museum and the Wings Club.

Trustee and Tennis Chairperson for the Millbrook Golf and Tennis Club from 1999 - 2001. Board Member of a New York Co-op Building in the 1990s

== Publications ==
- 1984 - Autobiography, "Takeoff" published by Crown Publishing Company
- 1984 - Researched and co-authored a magazine article with Dr. Jonathan Scher about pregnancy and flying published in Mothers Today Magazine.
- Wrote the Pilot’s Guide to a Perfect Plane Ride for Woman's Day Magazine
- Featured in Working Woman Magazine, Cosmopolitan, Harper's Bazaar, Glamour, Reader's Digest, Gold Coast Pictorial, Good Housekeeping,, Women's Wear Daily, Vogue, Woman's Day and the Smithsonian Air & Space Magazine.
- Appeared in books by Henry Holden, Captain Robert Buck, John M. Capozzi, Lisa Yount and Carole S. Briggs - list incomplete.
- American Way Magazine 2001 and 2015

== Awards and recognition ==
- 1974 - Tiburzi received the Amita Award honoring Italian-American Women of Achievement.
- 1979 - Recognized as a "Super Sister" and placed on Supersisters trading cards. These trading cards were distributed to school-age children nationwide.
- 1980 - Received the "Amelia Earhart Award" by the Northeast Chapter of Airport Managers
- 1982 - Featured in the Cutty Sark Salute to "Here's to Those Who Fly in the Face of Tradition" add campaign.
- 1984 - Recipient of the "Women of Accomplishment Award" by the Wings Club of New York City.
- 1985 - Recipient of the Zonta Club of New York's "Non-Stop Achievement Award".
- 1987 - Selected by Woman's Day Magazine as one of "50 Women Wo Have Changed Our Lives".
- 1988 - Featured in Family Circle Magazine's "Women Who Make a Difference".
- 1998 - Recipient of the "Women Making History Award" from the National Women's History Museum in Washington, D.C.
- 2014 - Bonnie Tiburzi Caputo Day In the Town of Brookhaven, New York on April 2, 2014
- 2017 - Tiburzi was the Key Note Speaker at the New York Bar Associations Aviation Division in New York City.
- 2017 - Recipient of the "Women That Soar Award" in Dallas, Texas.
- 2018 - Inducted into the "Women in Aviation International Hall of Fame" in Reno, Nevada.
- 2018 - Appeared in American Airlines’ Celebrated Living Magazine.
- 2018 - Appeared in American Way magazine with Film Independence Bonnie Award winner Chloe Zhao
- 2019 - Tiburzi led a panel discussion at "The Wing" in New York City with film directors Debra Granik and Marielle Heller.
- 2020 - Appeared in American Way magazine with Film Independent Bonnie Award winner Kelly Reichardt

In 2018, the Independent Spirit Awards inaugurated the Bonnie Award, named after Tiburzi. Chloé Zhao was the first to receive this award.

Tiburzi's American Airlines pilot uniform is on display at the Smithsonian's National Air and Space Museum in Washington, D.C.

== See also ==
- Emily Howell, Frontier Airlines pilot
- Turi Widerøe, SAS pilot
- Yvonne Sintes, UK pilot
