= Liam McLaughlin =

American politician (born 1968)

Liam J. McLaughlin

Yonkers Inspector General
- Incumbent
- Assumed office January 20, 2020

President of the Yonkers City Council
- In office January 1, 2014 – December 31, 2017
- Preceded by: Chuck Lesnick
- Succeeded by: Michael Khader

Member of the Yonkers City Council from the 4th district
- In office January 1, 2000 – December 31, 2010
- Preceded by: Carlo Calvi
- Succeeded by: Dennis Shepherd

Personal details
- Party: Republican
- Spouse: Debbie McLaughlin
- Children: Ryan McLaughlin
- Education: Fordham University

Liam J. McLaughlin (born January 16, 1968) is the former Council President of the Yonkers City Council. He is a practicing attorney and partner at McLaughlin & Zerafa, LLP, an estates and trusts firm. On November 7, 2017 McLaughlin lost his re-election bid in a Democratic upset against attorney and CIA veteran Mike Khader. McLaughlin now is serving as Inspector General for the City of Yonkers.

== Early career and background ==
McLaughlin grew up in Yonkers, New York and attended Cardinal Spellman High School and Fordham University where he received a bachelor's degree in accounting in 1989. He became an auditor at Ernst and Young and went on to receive a Juris Doctor from New York Law School in 1996.

== Political career ==
Involved with a local neighborhood association, as well as the Ancient Order of Hibernians, McLaughlin first ran for the City Council in Yonkers, New York's fourth largest city and one of the "Big Five" cities in the State, in a 1997 election for the fourth district council seat. He scored an impressive 38% of the vote as a third-party candidate on the Conservative Party of New York State line. He won the seat outright during the 1999 general election after winning the Republican primary and served from 2000 to 2010, including service as Minority Leader and Majority Leader.

He ran for the New York State Senate in 2010 after being term-limited off the Council against State Senator Andrea Stewart-Cousins, garnering 45% of the vote. He then returned to private law practice and served as an adjunct professor at Manhattan College.

In 2013, he was elected Council President. His first local law gave a school tax exemption to military veterans, which made Yonkers the first major city in New York to offer that benefit to service members. While Republicans across the nation surged to power on the coat tails on Donald Trump, McLaughlin was tossed out of office, beaten by Mike Khader, a son of Jordanian immigrants. With McLaughlin's defeat, the Yonkers City Council has changed to Democratic control. Khader won handily, defeating McLaughlin 54% to 46%.

== Electoral history ==
=== Yonkers City Council ===
Yonkers City Council 4th District 1997 General Election
Party	Candidate	Votes	%
Republican	Carlo J. Calvi	2,405	34.18%
Right to Life	Carlo J. Calvi	265	3.77%
Independence	Carlo J. Calvi	189	2.69%
Total	Carlo J. Calvi	2,859	40.69%
Conservative	Liam J. McLaughlin	2,698	38.40%
Democratic	Lucy DiVestea	1,470	20.92%
Total votes		7,037	100%
Republican hold			

Yonkers City Council 4th District 1999 Republican Primary
Party	Candidate	Votes	%
Republican	Liam J. McLaughlin	-	-%
Republican	Carlo J. Calvi (incumbent)	-	-%
Total votes		-	100%

Yonkers City Council 4th District 1999 Conservative Primary
Party	Candidate	Votes	%
Conservative	Liam J. McLaughlin	-	-%
Conservative	Carlo J. Calvi (incumbent)	-	-%
Total votes		-	100%

Yonkers City Council 4th District 1999 General Election
Party	Candidate	Votes	%
Republican	Liam J. McLaughlin	2,280	38.40%
Conservative	Liam J. McLaughlin	477	8.03%
Total	Liam J. McLaughlin	2,757	46.44%
Independence	Carlo J. Calvi	1,585	26.70%
Right to Life	Carlo J. Calvi	563	9.48%
Total	Carlo J. Calvi (incumbent)	2,148	36.18%
Democratic	Anthony DiPopolo Jr.	983	16.56%
Good Government	Anthony DiPopolo Jr.	49	0.83%
Total	Anthony DiPopolo Jr.	1,032	17.38%
Total votes		5,937	100%
Republican hold			

Yonkers City Council 4th District 2001 General Election
Party	Candidate	Votes	%
Republican	Liam J. McLaughlin	2,988	50.96%
Right to Life	Liam J. McLaughlin	302	5.15%
Working Families	Liam J. McLaughlin	72	1.23%
Total	Liam J. McLaughlin (incumbent)	3,362	57.34%
Democratic	Frank A. Adamo Jr.	1,855	31.64%
Independence	Frank A. Adamo Jr.	393	6.70%
Total	Frank A. Adamo Jr.	2,248	38.34%
Conservative	Marina B. Manganelli	253	4.32%
Total votes		5,863	100%
Republican hold			

Yonkers City Council 4th District 2003 General Election
Party	Candidate	Votes	%
Republican	Liam J. McLaughlin (incumbent)	3,096	55.74%
Democratic	Kevin T. Cacace	1,843	33.18%
Conservative	Kevin T. Cacace	327	5.89%
Independence	Kevin T. Cacace	215	3.87%
Total	Kevin T. Cacace	2,385	42.94%
Working Families	Keith Purce	72	1.30%
Write-in		1	0.02%
Total votes		5,554	100%
Republican hold			

Yonkers City Council 4th District 2005 General Election
Party	Candidate	Votes	%
Republican	Liam J. McLaughlin	2,135	46.09%
Conservative	Liam J. McLaughlin	398	8.59%
Total	Liam J. McLaughlin (incumbent)	2,533	54.68%
Democratic	Mario DeGiorgio	2,098	45.29%
Write-in		1	0.02%
Total votes		4,632	100%
Republican hold			

=== New York State Senate ===
New York's 35th Senatorial District 2010 General Election
Party	Candidate	Votes	%
Democratic	Andrea Stewart-Cousins	39,226	50.77%
Working Families	Andrea Stewart-Cousins	2,220	2.87%
Independence	Andrea Stewart-Cousins	1,536	1.99%
Total	Andrea Stewart-Cousins (incumbent)	42,982	55.63%
Republican	Liam J. McLaughlin	29,393	38.04%
Conservative	Liam J. McLaughlin	4,867	6.30%
Total	Liam J. McLaughlin	34,260	44.34%
Write-in		22	0.03%
Total votes		77,264	100%
Democratic hold			

=== Yonkers City Council President ===
Yonkers City Council President 2013 Conservative Primary
Party	Candidate	Votes	%
Conservative	Liam J. McLaughlin	295	79.52%
Conservative	Grace C. Borrani	71	19.14%
Write-in		5	1.35%
Total votes		371	100%

Yonkers City Council President 2013 Democratic Primary
Party	Candidate	Votes	%
Democratic	Michael S. Rotanelli	2,180	50.76%
Democratic	Ivy Reeves	2,048	47.68%
write-in	Liam J. McLaughlin	40	0.93%
Write-in		27	0.63%
Total votes		4,295	100%

Yonkers City Council President 2013 General Election
Party	Candidate	Votes	%
Republican	Liam J. McLaughlin	10,579	42.35%
Conservative	Liam J. McLaughlin	2,284	9.14%
Independence	Liam J. McLaughlin	1,014	4.06%
Total	Liam J. McLaughlin	13,577	54.36%
Democratic	Michael S. Rotanelli	9,914	39.69%
BYP	Michael S. Rotanelli	251	1.00%
Total	Michael S. Rotanelli	10,165	40.70%
Every Vote Counts	Grace C. Borrani	692	2.77%
write-in	Ivy Reeves	222	0.89%
Write-in		22	0.09%
Total votes		24,978	100%
Republican gain from Democratic			

Yonkers City Council President 2017 Conservative Primary
Party	Candidate	Votes	%
Conservative	Liam J. McLaughlin (incumbent)	362	91.18%
write-in	Mike Khader	25	6.30%
Write-in		10	2.52%
Total votes		397	100%

Yonkers City Council President 2017 Independence Primary
Party	Candidate	Votes	%
Independence	Mike Khader	340	56.67%
write-in	Liam J. McLaughlin (incumbent)	249	41.50%
Write-in		11	1.83%
Total votes		600	100%

Yonkers City Council President 2017 Green Primary
Party	Candidate	Votes	%
Green	Mike Khader	37	66.07%
Green	Liam J. McLaughlin (incumbent)	19	33.93%
Total votes		56	100%

Yonkers City Council President 2017 General Election
Party	Candidate	Votes	%
Democratic	Mike Khader	15,762	49.28%
Working Families	Mike Khader	624	1.95%
Independence	Mike Khader	565	1.77%
Green	Mike Khader	220	0.56%
Women's Equality	Mike Khader	135	0.42%
Total	Mike Khader	17,306	54.10%
Republican	Liam J. McLaughlin	12,078	37.76%
Conservative	Liam J. McLaughlin	2,359	7.38%
Reform	Liam J. McLaughlin	225	0.70%
Total	Liam J. McLaughlin	14,662	45.84%
Write-in		18	0.06%
Total votes		31,986	100%
Democratic gain from Republican			

== Notes ==
Civic offices
Preceded by Carlo Calvi	Member of the Yonkers City Council from the 4th district 2000–2010	Succeeded by Dennis Shepherd
Political offices
Preceded by Chuck Lesnick	Yonkers City Council President; 2014–2017	Succeeded by Mike Khader
