= Peter A. Peyser =

United States congressman (1921–2014)

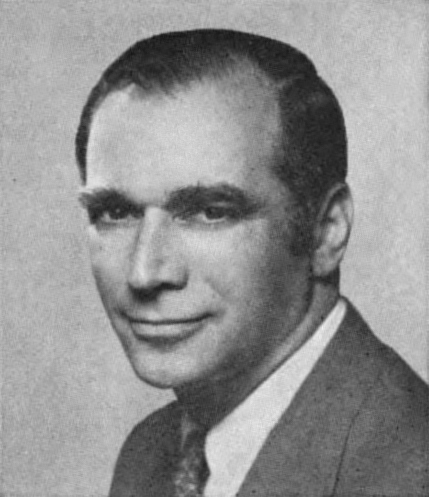
- Peyser in 1973

Member of the U.S. House of Representatives from New York
- In office January 3, 1971 – January 3, 1977
- Preceded by: Richard Ottinger
- Succeeded by: Bruce F. Caputo
- Constituency: 25th district (1971–1973); 23rd district (1973–1977)
- In office January 3, 1979 – January 3, 1983
- Preceded by: Bruce F. Caputo
- Succeeded by: Samuel S. Stratton (redistricting)
- Constituency: 23rd district

Personal details
- Born: September 7, 1921 Cedarhurst, New York, U.S.
- Died: October 9, 2014 (aged 93) Irvington, New York, U.S.
- Resting place: Sleepy Hollow Cemetery
- Party: Republican (until 1977); Democratic (1977–2014)
- Spouse: Marguerite Richards
- Children: 5, including Penny
- Education: Colgate University

Peter A. Peyser (September 7, 1921 – October 9, 2014) was a United States representative from New York, serving from 1971 to 1977 as a Republican and from 1979 to 1983 as a Democrat.

== Political career ==
Peyser's political career began in 1962 when he ran for Mayor of Irvington, New York. A community of 5,000 people, Irvington was governed by a part-time Board of Trustees and Mayor. The Mayor was paid $100 a month for his efforts.

=== Campaigns for Congress ===
In 1969, Peyser announced a dark-horse candidacy for Congress as a Republican for New York's 25th congressional district. At the time of his announcement, the incumbent Congressman from the area was Richard L. Ottinger, a popular Democrat. Later in 1969, Ottinger announced his candidacy for the U.S. Senate, seeking to oust Republican Sen. Charles Goodell, who had been appointed by Governor Nelson Rockefeller to fill Robert F. Kennedy's seat after the latter's assassination in 1968. After Ottinger's announcement, three other Republicans, joined the race for the GOP nomination.

Peyser won the June primary and went on to win the general election against William Dretzin. Peyser's slogan was "Nixon Picks Him."

For the 1972 election, the district was redrawn because of the 1970 census. Now labeled the 23rd, it was 1/3 the northern Bronx, 1/3 the City of Yonkers, and 1/3 suburban communities along the Hudson River. That year, while Nixon carried the district comfortably, Peyser eked out a 1,246-vote margin over former Rep. Richard L. Ottinger who sought to return to Congress after his defeat for the Senate in 1970.

For the 1974 election, Peyser ran again for the 23rd district. Peyser won the September Republican primary against a write-in campaign by Anthony J. DeVito. He went on to win the general election against William Greenawalt, a Democrat from Hartsdale.

=== Tenure in Congress ===
During his three terms in the House as a Republican, Peyser made a name for himself as a consumer activist on the Committee on Agriculture, as assignment usually not sought by New York Members. He played an important role on the "ERISA Task Force" set up by House leaders to develop the landmark legislation that governs employee benefit and retirement plans.

Peyser was a staunch Nixon supporter and backed his Vietnam War policies. He was one of the last Members of the New York Congressional delegation to call for the President's impeachment, doing so only days before Nixon announced his resignation.

=== Senate campaign ===
In 1976, Peyser launched an ill-fated attempt to wrest the GOP nomination for the U.S. Senate away from incumbent Senator James Buckley. Buckley had won a three-way 1970 Senate race on the Conservative Party line, but aligned himself with the Republican caucus in the Senate. The GOP state committee sued the Peyser campaign to keep it off the September primary ballot, but the petition signatures gained by the Congressman withstood the test.

Buckley won the primary in a landslide and went on to defeat in the general election at the hands of Daniel Patrick Moynihan.

=== Change of party ===
Jilted by his party, Peyser announced in early 1977 that he was becoming a Democrat. Shortly thereafter, his former congressional colleague, Governor Hugh Carey, nominated Peyser to be Chairman of the New York Public Service Commission, perhaps the most powerful regulatory position in New York State at the time. The Republican-controlled State Senate, from which confirmation was required, immediately objected to the nomination as an example of cronyism, citing Peyser's lack of experience in utility regulation. Peyser mounted an effort to gain confirmation, but after the New York Times editorialized against his nomination, he withdrew.

=== Return to Congress ===
In 1978 the popular young Republican Congressman who replaced Peyser, Bruce Caputo, left his seat to run for Lieutenant Governor of New York. Peyser entered the Democratic primary and easily defeated a young county legislator and future Assemblyman named Richard Brodsky. Peyser easily gained election in 1978 and again in 1980.

=== Second tenure in Congress ===
During his four years in Congress as a Democrat, Peyser aligned himself closely with the leadership of Speaker Tip O'Neill.

=== Later campaigns ===
The 1980 census brought on another round of redistricting in New York and the loss of five congressional seats, from 43 to 38. The Republican Senate in Albany exacted its revenge on the "turncoat" congressman, carving his district into three pieces and leaving him only one realistic option aside from retirement: A campaign against his popular friend, Republican Rep. Benjamin Gilman. The new 20th district was far from the compact urban/suburban district Peyser had represented. It extended almost 200 miles in length and covered territory from suburban Westchester and Rockland counties to rural counties like Orange and Sullivan counties in the Catskills. Only 20% of the voters in the new district had been in Peyser's congressional district. Gilman won comfortably.

Peyser made an attempt at a comeback in 1984, running in a Democratic primary in an adjacent district in which he did not live. He finished third.

== Personal life ==
Peyser was born in Cedarhurst, New York, the son of Rubye Bentley (Hoeflich) and Percy Asher Peyser. On December 23, 1949, Peyser married Marguerite Richards, a native of Monroe, Louisiana and Baltimore, Maryland. She had moved to New York City to attend the Parsons School of Design. In 1951, the Peysers moved to Irvington, New York. The Peysers had five children: Penelope (born 1951), Safi (née Carolyn, born 1952) a poet, Peter (born 1954), James (born 1956) and Thomas (born 1962). His daughter Penelope, known as Penny, became an actress. (Her uncle, John Peyser, was a Hollywood television and movie director.)

=== Death and burial ===
On October 9, 2014, Peyser died of Parkinson's disease. He was 93 and is buried in Sleepy Hollow Cemetery. His widow Marguerite Peyser died on May 11, 2020, at age 89 from COVID-19.

U.S. House of Representatives
Preceded by Richard Ottinger	Member of the U.S. House of Representatives from New York's 25th congressional district 1971–1973	Succeeded by Hamilton Fish IV
Preceded by Jonathan B. Bingham	Member of the U.S. House of Representatives from New York's 23rd congressional district 1973–1977	Succeeded by Bruce F. Caputo
Preceded by Bruce F. Caputo	Member of the U.S. House of Representatives from New York's 23rd congressional district 1979–1983	Succeeded by Samuel S. Stratton
