= Andrea Stewart-Cousins =

American politician (born 1950)

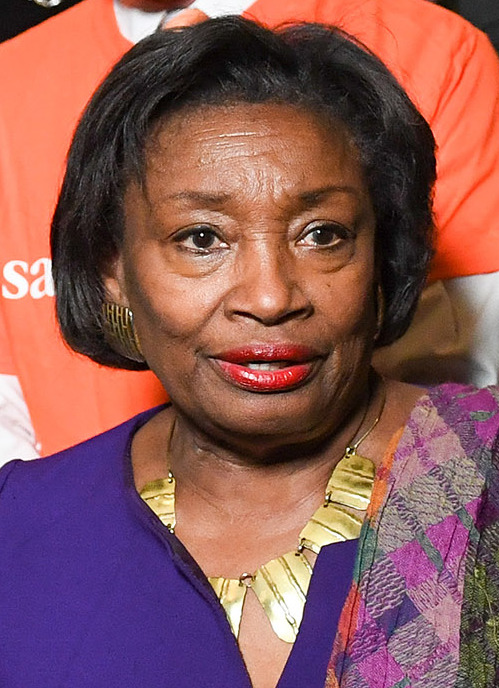
- Stewart-Cousins in 2020

Temporary President and Majority Leader of the New York State Senate
- Incumbent
- Assumed office January 9, 2019
- Deputy: Michael Gianaris
- Governor: Andrew Cuomo; Kathy Hochul
- Preceded by: John J. Flanagan

Acting Lieutenant Governor of New York
- In office April 12, 2022 – May 25, 2022
- Governor: Kathy Hochul
- Preceded by: Brian Benjamin
- Succeeded by: Antonio Delgado
- In office August 24, 2021 – September 9, 2021
- Governor: Kathy Hochul
- Preceded by: Kathy Hochul
- Succeeded by: Brian Benjamin

Minority Leader of the New York State Senate
- In office December 17, 2012 – January 9, 2019
- Deputy: Michael Gianaris; Jeffrey D. Klein
- Preceded by: John L. Sampson
- Succeeded by: John J. Flanagan

Member of the New York State Senate from the 35th district
- Incumbent
- Assumed office January 1, 2007
- Preceded by: Nicholas Spano

Member of the Westchester County Board of Legislators from the 16th district
- In office 1996–2007
- Preceded by: Herman Keith
- Succeeded by: Ken Jenkins

Personal details
- Born: Andrea Alice Stewart; September 2, 1950 (age 76) New York City, New York, U.S.
- Party: Democratic
- Spouse: Thomas Cousins (m. 1979; died 2007)
- Children: 3
- Education: Pace University (BA, MPA); Lehman College (GrCert)
- Website: Official website

Andrea Alice Stewart-Cousins (née Stewart; born September 2, 1950) is an American politician and educator from Yonkers, New York. A member of the Democratic Party, Stewart-Cousins represents District 35 in the New York State Senate and serves as Senate Majority Leader and Temporary President of the Senate.

Stewart-Cousins served as a Westchester County legislator from 1996 to 2006. She was first elected to the New York State Senate in 2006. In 2012, she was chosen by her colleagues to lead the Senate Democratic Conference. After the Democratic Party won a Senate majority in the 2018 elections, Stewart-Cousins became Senate majority leader in January 2019. Under Governor Kathy Hochul, she served as acting lieutenant governor of New York for 16 days in 2021 and from April 12, 2022 to May 5, 2022. Stewart-Cousins is the first woman in New York State history to lead a conference in the New York State Legislature and the first Black woman to serve as New York's lieutenant governor.

== Early life, family, and education ==
Andrea Alice Stewart was born on September 2, 1950, in New York City. She is the daughter of Bob Stewart, a decorated World War II veteran and repairman, and Beryl Stewart, a stenographer and community activist. The Stewart family resided in public housing in Manhattan and the Bronx, and Andrea suffered from chronic asthma.

Stewart became a single parent at the age of 19. She married Thomas Cousins in 1979.

Stewart-Cousins earned her Bachelor of Science degree from Pace University in 1986 and earned her teaching credentials in business education from Lehman College. She received her Master of Public Administration degree from Pace University in May 2008 and is a member of Pi Alpha Alpha, the public administration honor society.

Stewart-Cousins has three children and four grandchildren. Her husband, Thomas Cousins, died on November 26, 2007.

== Early career ==
Stewart-Cousins spent twenty years working in the private sector, including thirteen years in sales and marketing with New York Telephone. After New York Telephone was acquired through a merger with NYNEX in 1984, she received a buyout and pursued a college degree while working for the Gannett newspaper, The Herald Statesman. She pursued careers in teaching and journalism before entering public service.

== Public service and political career ==
=== Yonkers Director of Community Affairs ===
Stewart-Cousins's public service career began in 1992 when she was appointed Director of Community Affairs for the City of Yonkers during Terence Zaleski's term as mayor. In that role, she created an internship program for the hearing-impaired and for children in working families. She also advocated for and contributed to the revitalization of the City of Yonkers and was a founder of the original "Art on Main Street". Stewart-Cousins was a co-creator of "River Fest", a widely attended multi-cultural citywide celebration on the Hudson River in Yonkers.

=== Westchester County Legislator ===
Prior to her election to the New York State Senate in 2006, Stewart-Cousins served as a Westchester County Legislator representing Yonkers. First elected in 1995, she served from 1996 to 2006. During her tenure, she was elected Majority Whip and vice-chair. Stewart-Cousins authored living wage laws, smoke-free workplace laws, tougher gun laws, laws that prosecute predatory lenders, tax cuts for seniors and veterans, and Westchester County's first human rights laws.

=== New York State Senate ===
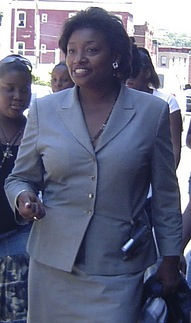
Stewart-Cousins in 2007

Stewart-Cousins first ran for New York State Senate in 2004. The Working Families Party did not endorse her during this election cycle. Incumbent Republican State Senator Nicholas Spano defeated her by a margin of 18 votes. In 2006, she challenged Spano again and defeated him. As of 2019, Senate District 35 includes all of the Towns of Greenburgh and Mt. Pleasant, and portions of Yonkers.

Stewart-Cousins voted in favor of same-sex marriage legislation on December 2, 2009, but the bill was defeated. A same-sex marriage law was eventually passed in 2011. Stewart-Cousins is a vocal supporter of abortion rights, and has pushed for legislation to expand abortion access in the State of New York.

On April 17, 2010, it was reported that Stewart-Cousins was under consideration by then-gubernatorial candidate Andrew Cuomo to be his running mate. Cuomo ultimately chose Rochester mayor Bob Duffy instead.

==== Senate Democratic Leader ====
On December 17, 2012, Stewart-Cousins was elected Senate Democratic Leader. Stewart-Cousins is the first woman in history to lead a conference in the New York State Legislature.

==== Senate Majority Leader ====
Stewart-Cousins delivers remarks on the New York Senate floor on the 2022 Buffalo shooting.

The Democratic Party won a Senate majority in the 2018 elections. On January 9, 2019, Stewart-Cousins was elected Senate Majority Leader. She serves as the body's Majority Leader and Temporary President, and is the first female Senate Majority Leader in New York history. In 2019, Stewart-Cousins sponsored the Housing Stability and Tenant Protection Act of 2019, which overhauled the rules affecting rent-controlled apartments in New York City. During Stewart-Cousins's first year as Senate Majority Leader, New York passed a variety of progressive laws on issues like climate change, voting rights, abortion rights, criminal justice reform, gender equality, gun control, marijuana decriminalization, LGBT rights, and immigration. According to City & State New York, Stewart-Cousins employs a "consensus-driven approach" to leading the Senate Democratic Conference that sets her "apart from her predecessors".

In 2019, Stewart-Cousins was named to the Crain's New York Business biennial list of the "Most Powerful Women in New York".

Following the resignation of Gov. Andrew Cuomo due to multiple allegations of sexual harassment, Lt. Gov. Kathy Hochul succeeded him as governor. Per state law, as state Senate Majority Leader, Stewart-Cousins became the state's Acting Lieutenant Governor until Hochul appointed a full-time replacement. She was the first Black woman to serve in this role. This was also the first time New York was governed by both a female governor and lieutenant governor. Hochul selected Brian Benjamin as lieutenant governor, and he took office on September 9, 2021. Benjamin resigned on April 12, 2022 after being arrested in a corruption scandal. Stewart-Cousins once again assumed the role of acting lieutenant governor at that time. Rep. Antonio Delgado was sworn in as the new lieutenant governor of New York on May 25, 2022.

== Electoral history ==
=== Westchester County Legislature ===
Westchester County Legislature 16th District 1995 Democratic Primary
Party	Candidate	Votes	%
Democratic	Andrea Stewart-Cousins	-	-%
Democratic	Herman Keith (incumbent)	-	-%
Total votes		-	100%

Westchester County Legislature 16th District 1995 General Election
Party	Candidate	Votes	%
Democratic	Andrea Stewart-Cousins	3,214	65.50%
Independence	Andrea Stewart-Cousins	293	5.97%
Total	Andrea Stewart-Cousins	3,507	71.47%
Liberal	Herman Keith	874	17.81%
Tax Cut Now	Herman Keith	526	10.72%
Total	Herman Keith (incumbent)	1,400	28.53%
Total votes		4,907	100%
Democratic hold			

Westchester County Legislature 16th District 1997 General Election
Party	Candidate	Votes	%
Democratic	Andrea Stewart-Cousins (incumbent)	4,442	81.37%
Republican	Loretta Martial	1,017	18.63%
Total votes		5,459	100%
Democratic hold			

Westchester County Legislature 16th District 1999 General Election
Party	Candidate	Votes	%
Democratic	Andrea Stewart-Cousins	2,899	71.30%
Working Families	Andrea Stewart-Cousins	155	3.81%
Total	Andrea Stewart-Cousins (incumbent)	3,054	75.11%
Republican	Dhyalma Vazquez	671	16.50%
Independence	Dhyalma Vazquez	219	5.39%
Conservative	Dhyalma Vazquez	122	3.00%
Total	Dhyalma Vazquez	1,012	24.89%
Total votes		4,066	100%
Democratic hold			

Westchester County Legislature 16th District 2001 General Election
Party	Candidate	Votes	%
Democratic	Andrea Stewart-Cousins	4,527	96.30%
Working Families	Andrea Stewart-Cousins	155	3.30%
Total	Andrea Stewart-Cousins (incumbent)	4,700	99.98%
Write-in		1	0.02%
Total votes		4,701	100%
Democratic hold			

Westchester County Legislature 16th District 2003 General Election
Party	Candidate	Votes	%
Democratic	Andrea Stewart-Cousins	4,870	56.96%
Working Families	Andrea Stewart-Cousins	414	4.84%
Independence	Andrea Stewart-Cousins	397	4.64%
Total	Andrea Stewart-Cousins (incumbent)	5,681	66.44%
Republican	Jeanne Vergari Martinelli	2,459	28.76%
Conservative	Jeanne Vergari Martinelli	410	4.80%
Total	Jeanne Vergari Martinelli	2,869	33.56%
Total votes		8,550	100%
Democratic hold			

Westchester County Legislature 16th District 2005 General Election
Party	Candidate	Votes	%
Democratic	Andrea Stewart-Cousins	5,303	69.01%
Working Families	Andrea Stewart-Cousins	328	4.27%
Total	Andrea Stewart-Cousins (incumbent)	5,631	73.28%
Republican	Cicely P. Greaves-Vega	1,525	19.85%
Conservative	Cicely P. Greaves-Vega	264	3.44%
Independence	Cicely P. Greaves-Vega	252	3.28%
Total	Cicely P. Greaves-Vega	2,041	26.56%
Write-in		12	0.16%
Total votes		7,684	100%
Democratic hold			

=== New York State Senate ===
New York's 35th Senatorial District 2004 General Election
Party	Candidate	Votes	%
Republican	Nicholas A. Spano	-	-%
Conservative	Nicholas A. Spano	-	-%
Independence	Nicholas A. Spano	-	-%
Working Families	Nicholas A. Spano	-	-%
Total	Nicholas A. Spano (incumbent)	57,073	50.01%
Democratic	Andrea Stewart-Cousins	57,055	49.99%
Total votes		114,128	100%
Republican hold			

New York's 35th Senatorial District 2006 General Election
Party	Candidate	Votes	%
Democratic	Andrea Stewart-Cousins	43,241	51.13%
Republican	Nicholas A. Spano	34,261	40.51%
Independence	Nicholas A. Spano	3,711	4.39%
Conservative	Nicholas A. Spano	3,190	3.77%
Total	Nicholas A. Spano (incumbent)	41,162	48.68%
Right to Life	Francis Bowen (write-in)	140	0.17%
Constitution	Delfim Heusler (write-in)	21	0.02%
Total votes		84,564	100%
Democratic gain from Republican			

New York's 35th Senatorial District 2008 General Election
Party	Candidate	Votes	%
Democratic	Andrea Stewart-Cousins	67,648	58.95%
Working Families	Andrea Stewart-Cousins	3,163	2.76%
Total	Andrea Stewart-Cousins (incumbent)	70,811	61.70%
Republican	John M. Murtagh	36,739	32.01%
Independence	John M. Murtagh	3,623	3.16%
Conservative	John M. Murtagh	3,578	3.12%
Total	John M. Murtagh	43,940	38.29%
Write-in		9	0.01%
Total votes		114,760	100%
Democratic hold			

New York's 35th Senatorial District 2010 General Election
Party	Candidate	Votes	%
Democratic	Andrea Stewart-Cousins	39,226	50.77%
Working Families	Andrea Stewart-Cousins	2,220	2.87%
Independence	Andrea Stewart-Cousins	1,536	1.99%
Total	Andrea Stewart-Cousins (incumbent)	42,982	55.63%
Republican	Liam McLaughlin	29,393	38.04%
Conservative	Liam McLaughlin	4,867	6.30%
Total	Liam McLaughlin	34,260	44.34%
Write-in		22	0.03%
Total votes		77,264	100%
Democratic hold			

New York's 35th Senatorial District 2012 General Election
Party	Candidate	Votes	%
Democratic	Andrea Stewart-Cousins	77,012	91.07%
Working Families	Andrea Stewart-Cousins	4,044	4.78%
Independence	Andrea Stewart-Cousins	3,124	3.69%
Total	Andrea Stewart-Cousins (incumbent)	84,180	99.54%
Write-in		386	0.46%
Total votes		84,566	100%
Democratic hold			

New York's 35th Senatorial District 2014 General Election
Party	Candidate	Votes	%
Democratic	Andrea Stewart-Cousins	38,073	63.76%
Working Families	Andrea Stewart-Cousins	3,058	5.12%
Women's Equality	Andrea Stewart-Cousins	1,489	2.49%
Independence	Andrea Stewart-Cousins	1,242	2.08%
Total	Andrea Stewart-Cousins (incumbent)	43,862	73.46%
Republican	Robert Lopez Foti	15,811	26.48%
Conservative	Robert Lopez Foti	0	0.00%
Total	Robert Lopez Foti	15,811	26.48%
Write-in		37	0.06%
Total votes		59,710	100%
Democratic hold			

New York's 35th Senatorial District 2016 General Election
Party	Candidate	Votes	%
Democratic	Andrea Stewart-Cousins	87,271	91.57%
Working Families	Andrea Stewart-Cousins	4,216	4.42%
Independence	Andrea Stewart-Cousins	2,178	2.29%
Women's Equality	Andrea Stewart-Cousins	1,199	1.26%
Total	Andrea Stewart-Cousins (incumbent)	94,864	99.54%
Write-in		440	0.46%
Total votes		95,304	100%
Democratic hold			

New York's 35th Senatorial District 2018 Democratic Primary
Party	Candidate	Votes	%
Democratic	Andrea Stewart-Cousins (incumbent)	25,129	80.92%
Democratic	Virginia M. Perez	5,925	19.08%
Total votes		31,054	100%

New York's 35th Senatorial District 2018 General Election
Party	Candidate	Votes	%
Democratic	Andrea Stewart-Cousins	74,393	92.05%
Working Families	Andrea Stewart-Cousins	2,630	3.25%
Independence	Andrea Stewart-Cousins	1,594	1.97%
Women's Equality	Andrea Stewart-Cousins	885	1.10%
Reform	Andrea Stewart-Cousins	572	0.71%
Total	Andrea Stewart-Cousins (incumbent)	80,074	99.08%
Write-in		475	0.59%
Total votes		80,819	100%
Democratic hold			

New York's 35th Senatorial District 2020 General Election
Party	Candidate	Votes	%
Democratic	Andrea Stewart-Cousins	93,807	89.51%
Working Families	Andrea Stewart-Cousins	10,004	9.55%
Total	Andrea Stewart-Cousins (incumbent)	103,811	99.63%
Write-in		386	0.37%
Total votes		104,197	100%
Democratic hold			

== See also ==
- 2009 New York State Senate leadership crisis
- List of minority governors and lieutenant governors in the United States

New York State Senate
Preceded by Nicholas Spano	Member of the New York State Senate from the 35th district 2007–present	Incumbent
Preceded by John L. Sampson	Minority Leader of the New York State Senate; 2012–2019	Succeeded by John J. Flanagan
Preceded by John Flanagan	Temporary President and Majority Leader of the New York Senate; 2019–present	Incumbent
Political offices
Preceded by Kathy Hochul	Lieutenant Governor of New York; Acting; 2021	Succeeded by Brian Benjamin
Preceded by Brian Benjamin	Lieutenant Governor of New York; Acting; 2022	Succeeded by Antonio Delgado
