= John J. Flanagan =

American politician

John Flanagan
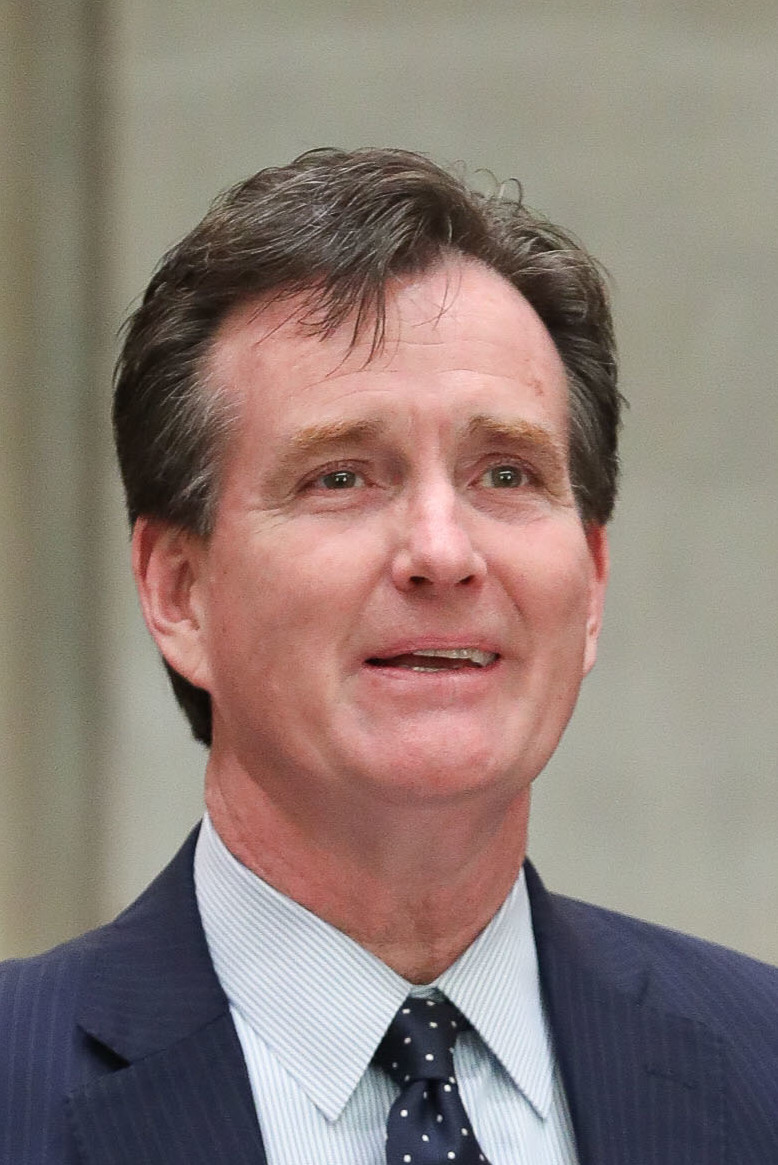
- Flanagan in 2020

Minority Leader of the New York State Senate
- In office January 2, 2019 – June 28, 2020
- Preceded by: Andrea Stewart-Cousins
- Succeeded by: Rob Ortt

Temporary President and Majority Leader of the New York State Senate
- In office May 11, 2015 – January 2, 2019
- Deputy: Tom Libous; John DeFrancisco
- Governor: Andrew Cuomo
- Preceded by: Dean Skelos
- Succeeded by: Andrea Stewart-Cousins

Member of the New York State Senate from the 2nd district
- In office January 1, 2003 – June 28, 2020
- Preceded by: James J. Lack
- Succeeded by: Mario Mattera

Member of the New York State Assembly from the 9th district
- In office January 1, 1987 – December 31, 2002
- Preceded by: John Flanagan
- Succeeded by: Andrew Raia

Personal details
- Born: May 7, 1961 (age 65) West Islip, New York, U.S.
- Party: Republican
- Spouse: Lisa Perez
- Children: 3
- Education: College of William and Mary (BA); Touro College (JD)
- Website: State Senate website

John J. Flanagan (born May 7, 1961) is an American politician from Long Island, New York. A Republican, Flanagan represented New York's 2nd State Senate district from 2003 to 2020. He also served as senate majority leader from 2015 to 2019, and as senate minority leader from 2019 to 2020. Prior to his senate tenure, Flanagan served in the New York State Assembly from 1987 to 2002.

== Early life and education ==
Flanagan was raised in Huntington, New York and attended Harborfields High School. He graduated from the College of William & Mary in 1983 with a B.A. in economics. Flanagan received a J.D. degree from Touro Law Center in 1990 and was admitted to practice law in New York State in 1991.

== Political career ==
Flanagan was elected to the New York State Assembly at age 25 in 1986 following the sudden death of his father, John J. Flanagan Sr.; Flanagan ran for the assembly seat that was vacated due to his father's death. In 2002, Flanagan sought the assembly minority leader post, and was defeated 27–26 by fellow Republican Charles H. Nesbitt. Flanagan was a member of the New York State Assembly from 1987 until 2002, when he was elected to the State Senate.

Before becoming temporary president and majority leader of the New York state senate, Flanagan served as the chairman of the senate standing committee on education and as a member of the committees on codes; corporations, authorities and commissions; finance; higher education; insurance; judiciary; rules and veterans, homeland security and military affairs. In 2011, Flanagan voted against allowing same-sex marriage in New York during the Senate roll-call vote on the Marriage Equality Act, which legally recognized same-sex marriages performed in the state; the bill passed in a closely divided Senate vote of 33–29 and was signed into law. In 2013, he voted in favor of the firearm law known as the NY SAFE Act, but he later expressed willingness to reconsider or modify that legislation.

As chair of the New York Senate Education Committee, Flanagan held hearings across the state to examine several major issues including state assessments, the implementation of common core state standards and the protection of student privacy. The hearing series was called "The Regents Reform Agenda: 'Assessing' Our Progress" and was held on Long Island and in New York City, Syracuse, Buffalo and Albany.

On May 11, 2015, Flanagan was elected senate majority leader and Temporary President of the New York State Senate following Dean Skelos's resignation from the post. As senate majority leader, Flanagan pushed back on efforts to extend the statute of limitations for victims of child sexual abuse in New York state. He did not allow the Child Victims Act, a bill that had already passed the New York Assembly, to come up for a vote in the senate in the 2017 spring session.

Flanagan also opposed the Reproductive Health Act, an abortion rights bill supported by Governor Andrew Cuomo and Senate Democrats that Senate Republicans blocked from a senate floor vote in 2018; Flanagan described the bill as a "radical expansion of abortion" that would allow certain non-physicians to perform abortion procedures.

In 2018, EPL/Environmental Advocates gave Flanagan an Oil Slick Award in their annual Environmental Scorecard.

In November 2018, fellow Republican Catharine Young attempted to oust Flanagan from his leadership post; however, Flanagan defeated her by a vote of 14 to nine. In January 2020, Flanagan announced that he would be unavailable for the beginning of the 2019 session because he was seeking treatment for alcoholism in a residential program.

After announcing in March 2020 that he would not seek re-election, Flanagan announced his resignation from the Senate (effective June 28, 2020) to become a lobbyist for Northwell Health, a network of hospitals in the New York City metropolitan area.

== Personal life ==
Flanagan married Lisa Perez, and the couple had three children. Spectrum News reported in August 2017 that Flanagan and his wife had divorced.

In August 2017, Flanagan publicly stated that he had recently completed an alcohol treatment program. In 2019, Flanagan revealed that he was undergoing inpatient treatment for alcoholism.

New York State Assembly
New constituency	Member of the New York State Assembly from the 9th district 1987–2002	Succeeded by Andrew Raia
New York State Senate
Preceded by James J. Lack	Member of the New York State Senate from the 2nd district 2003–2020	Succeeded by Mario Mattera
Preceded by Dean Skelos	Temporary President and Majority Leader of the New York Senate; 2015–2019	Succeeded by Andrea Stewart-Cousins
Preceded by Andrea Stewart-Cousins	Minority Leader of the New York Senate; 2019–2020	Succeeded by Rob Ortt
