= New York's 35th State Senate district =

American legislative district

Senator
Andrea Stewart-Cousins; D–Yonkers
- Registration: 57.8% Democratic; 15.3% Republican; 22.2% No party preference
- Demographics: 42% White; 17% Black; 31% Hispanic; 8% Asian
- Population (2017): 312,171
- Registered voters: 191,163

New York's 35th State Senate district is one of 63 districts in the New York State Senate. It has been represented by Democrat Andrea Stewart-Cousins, the current Senate Majority Leader, since 2007.

== Geography ==
District 35 covers a portion of southern Westchester County, including all of Greenburgh and Scarsdale and parts of Yonkers, White Plains, and New Rochelle.

The district overlaps with New York's 16th and 17th congressional districts, and with the 88th, 89th, 90th, 91st, 92nd, and 93rd districts of the New York State Assembly.

== Recent election results ==
=== 2026 ===
2026 New York State Senate election, District 35
Party	Candidate	Votes	%
Democratic	Andrea Stewart-Cousins		
Working Families	Andrea Stewart-Cousins		
Total	Andrea Stewart-Cousins (incumbent)		
Republican	Anthony Merante		
Write-in			
Total votes			

=== 2024 ===
2024 New York State Senate election, District 35
Party	Candidate	Votes	%
Democratic	Andrea Stewart-Cousins	77,106	
Working Families	Andrea Stewart-Cousins	4,148	
Total	Andrea Stewart-Cousins (incumbent)	81,254	66.1
Republican	Khristen Kerr	41,541	33.8
Write-in		55	0.1
Total votes		122,850	100.0
Democratic hold			

=== 2022 ===
2022 New York State Senate election, District 35
Party	Candidate	Votes	%
Democratic	Andrea Stewart-Cousins	52,693	
Working Families	Andrea Stewart-Cousins	3,527	
Total	Andrea Stewart-Cousins (incumbent)	56,220	64.8
Republican	Khristen Kerr	30,549	35.2
Write-in		20	0.0
Total votes		86,789	100.0
Democratic hold			

=== 2020 ===
2020 New York State Senate election, District 35
Party	Candidate	Votes	%
Democratic	Andrea Stewart-Cousins	93,833	
Working Families	Andrea Stewart-Cousins	10,006	
Total	Andrea Stewart-Cousins (incumbent)	103,839	99.6
Write-in		455	0.4
Total votes		104,294	100.0
Democratic hold			

=== 2018 ===
2018 New York State Senate election, District 35
Primary election
Party	Candidate	Votes	%
Democratic	Andrea Stewart-Cousins (incumbent)	25,129	80.9
Democratic	Virginia Perez	5,925	19.1
Write-in		0	0.0
Total votes		31,054	100.0
General election
Democratic	Andrea Stewart-Cousins	74,393	
Working Families	Andrea Stewart-Cousins	2,630	
Independence	Andrea Stewart-Cousins	1,594	
Women's Equality	Andrea Stewart-Cousins	885	
Reform	Andrea Stewart-Cousins	572	
Total	Andrea Stewart-Cousins (incumbent)	80,074	99.4
Write-in		475	0.6
Total votes		80,549	100.0
Democratic hold			

=== 2016 ===
2016 New York State Senate election, District 35
Party	Candidate	Votes	%
Democratic	Andrea Stewart-Cousins	87,271	
Working Families	Andrea Stewart-Cousins	4,216	
Independence	Andrea Stewart-Cousins	2,178	
Women's Equality	Andrea Stewart-Cousins	1,199	
Total	Andrea Stewart-Cousins (incumbent)	94,864	99.5
Write-in		440	0.5
Total votes		95,304	100.0
Democratic hold			

=== 2014 ===
2014 New York State Senate election, District 35
Primary election
Party	Candidate	Votes	%
Conservative	Robert Lopez Foti	2	100.0
Write-in		0	0.0
Total votes		2	100.0
General election
Democratic	Andrea Stewart-Cousins	38,073	
Working Families	Andrea Stewart-Cousins	3,058	
Women's Equality	Andrea Stewart-Cousins	1,489	
Independence	Andrea Stewart-Cousins	1,242	
Total	Andrea Stewart-Cousins (incumbent)	43,862	73.5
Republican	Robert Lopez Foti	15,811	
Conservative	Robert Lopez Foti	0	
Total	Robert Lopez Foti	15,811	26.4
Write-in		37	0.1
Total votes		59,710	100.0
Democratic hold			

=== 2012 ===
2012 New York State Senate election, District 35
Party	Candidate	Votes	%
Democratic	Andrea Stewart-Cousins	77,012	
Working Families	Andrea Stewart-Cousins	4,044	
Independence	Andrea Stewart-Cousins	3,124	
Total	Andrea Stewart-Cousins (incumbent)	84,180	99.6
Write-in		366	0.4
Total votes		84,546	100.0
Democratic hold			

=== Federal results in District 35 ===
Year	Office	Results
2020	President	Biden 74.9 – 24.1%
2016	President	Clinton 74.6 – 22.8%
2012	President	Obama 72.0 – 27.1%
2012	Senate	Gillibrand 78.3 – 20.5%
