= 2012 United States House of Representatives elections in New York =

- November 6, 2012

All 27 New York seats to the United States House of Representatives
	Majority party	Minority party
Party	Democratic	Republican
Last election	21	8
Seats won	21	6
Seat change	Steady	▼2
Popular vote	4,143,408	2,252,253
Percentage	58.22%	31.65%
Swing	▲0.15%	▼9.60%

Democratic hold Democratic gain
Republican hold Republican gain
Democratic
40–50%
50–60%
60–70%
70–80%
80–90%
90–100%
Republican
40–50%
50–60%
60–70%

The 2012 United States House of Representatives elections in New York were held on Tuesday, November 6, 2012, to elect the 27 U.S. representatives from the state. New York lost two congressional seats following the 2010 United States census; the two existing districts that were eliminated were District 9, held by Republican Rep. Bob Turner, and District 22, held by retiring Democratic Rep. Maurice Hinchey.

Party primary elections occurred on June 26, 2012, with the general election coinciding with the national elections on November 6, 2012.

On Election Day, 21 Democrats and six Republicans prevailed. The Democratic Party regained two seats previously held by Republicans, while the Republican Party regained one seat previously held by a Democrat.

== Redistricting ==
Each caucus in the New York State Legislature submitted their proposed 27-district maps to an appointed special master on February 29, 2012. On March 6, the special master Judge Roanne L. Mann released her own proposed map, and slightly revised them again on March 12. On March 19, the United States District Court for the Eastern District of New York imposed the special master's maps, with minor modifications.

== Overview ==
United States House of Representatives elections in New York, 2012
Party	Votes	Percentage	Seats	+/–
Democratic	4,127,348	58.00%	21	-
Republican	2,252,253	31.65%	6	-2
Green	41,672	0.59%	0	-
Conservative	23,414	0.33%	0	-
Socialist Workers	5,533	0.08%	0	-
Libertarian	2,986	0.04%	0	-
Others	663,130	9.32%	0	-
Totals	7,116,336	100.00%	27	-2

Popular vote
Democratic	58.00%
Republican	31.65%
Other	10.35%

House seats by party nomination
Democratic	77.78%
Working Families	74.07%
Independence	25.93%
Republican	22.22%
Conservative	18.52%

House seats by party registration
Democratic	77.78%
Republican	22.22%

== District 1 ==
2012 New York's 1st congressional district election
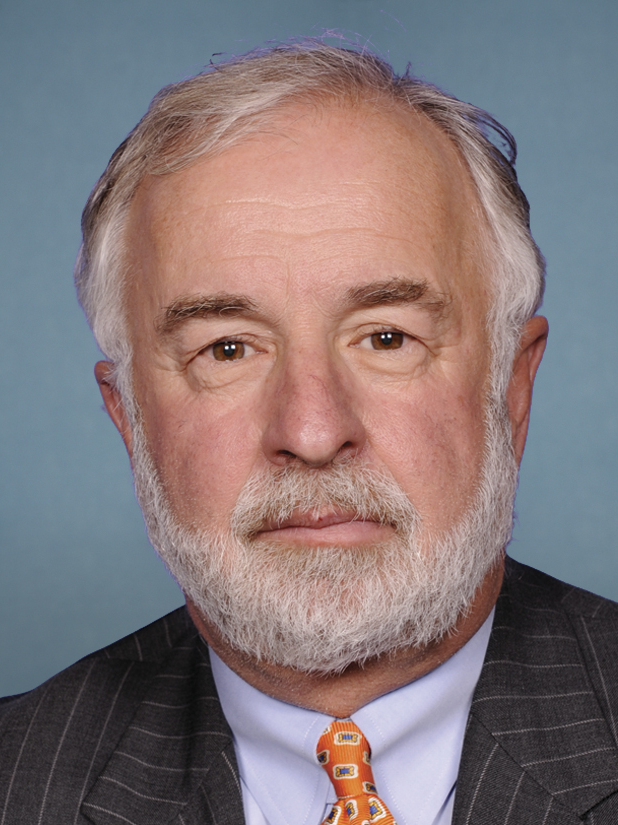

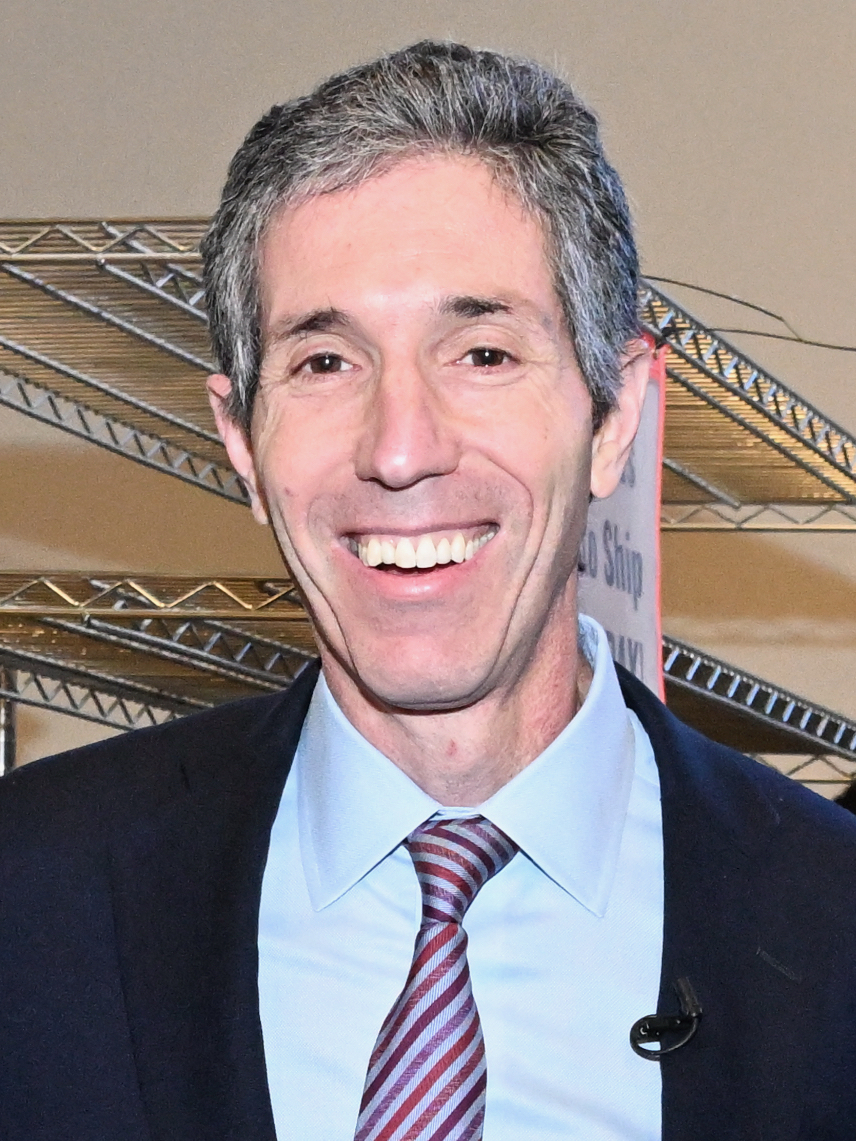
	Majority party	Minority party
Candidate	Tim Bishop	Randy Altschuler
Party	Democratic	Republican
Alliance	Working Families	Conservative; Independence
Popular vote	146,179	132,304
Percentage	52.5%	47.5%
- County results Bishop: 50–60%
U.S. Representative before election
Tim Bishop
Democratic
Elected U.S. Representative
Tim Bishop
Democratic

Incumbent Democrat Tim Bishop, who had represented the district since 2002, ran for re-election. He was re-elected with 50.2% of the vote in 2010. The district had a PVI of Even.

=== Democratic primary ===
Bishop kicked off his re-election campaign in April 2011.

In March 2011, Bishop was included in a list of potentially vulnerable Democrats by the Democratic Congressional Campaign Committee, having only won by 593 votes in 2010.

==== Candidates ====
===== Nominee =====
- Tim Bishop, incumbent U.S. representative

Bishop also had the endorsement of the Working Families Party.

=== Republican primary ===
==== Candidates ====
===== Nominee =====
- Randy Altschuler, businessman and nominee for this seat in 2010

===== Withdrawn =====
- George Demos, former Securities and Exchange Commission prosecutor and candidate for this seat in 2010
- Jason Sterling

==== Primary results ====
Republican primary results
Party	Candidate	Votes	%
Republican	Randy Altschuler	7,394	86.4
Republican	George Demos	1,166	13.6
Total votes		8,560	100.0

Altschuler also had the endorsement of the Conservative Party and Independence Party.

=== Libertarian primary ===
==== Candidates ====
===== Disqualified =====
- Rick Witt

=== General election ===
==== Endorsements ====
Tim Bishop (D)

Labor unions

- AFL–CIO
- International Brotherhood of Boilermakers
- National Association of Letter Carriers
- National Education Association
- New York State United Teachers
- Public Employees Federation
- United Steelworkers

Organizations

- Democratic Congressional Campaign Committee "Frontline" Program
- National Organization for Women
- Sierra Club
Randy Altschuler (R)

Organizations

- Gun Owners of America
- National Republican Congressional Committee "Young Guns" Program
- NRA Political Victory Fund
- United States Chamber of Commerce

==== Polling ====
Poll source	Date(s) administered	Sample size	Margin of error	Tim Bishop (D)	Randy Altschuler (R)	Undecided
McLaughlin (R-Altschuler)	October 14–15, 2012	400	± 4.9%	43%	48%	9%
McLaughlin (R-Prosperity First)	October 10–11, 2012	400	± 4.9%	46%	49%	5%
Siena College	September 5–10, 2012	624	± 3.9%	52%	39%	9%
Global Strategy (D-Bishop)	August 26–28, 2012	402	± 4.9%	53%	39%	8%
Pulse Opinion Research (R-Altschuler)	July 29, 2012	1,000	± 3.0%	43%	47%	10%
Garin-Hart-Yang (D-House Majority PAC)/SEIU)	July 17–18, 2012	407	± 4.9%	56%	32%	12%
Global Strategy (D-Bishop)	March 20–25, 2012	400	± 4.9%	53%	36%	11%

==== Predictions ====
Source	Ranking	As of
The Cook Political Report	Lean D	November 5, 2012
Rothenberg	Tilt D	November 2, 2012
Roll Call	Lean D	November 4, 2012
Sabato's Crystal Ball	Lean D	November 5, 2012
NY Times	Tossup	November 4, 2012
RCP	Tossup	November 4, 2012
The Hill	Tossup	November 4, 2012

==== Results ====
On election day, Bishop prevailed by a 52.2%-47.8% margin.

New York's 1st congressional district, 2012
Party	Candidate	Votes	%
Democratic	Tim Bishop	135,118	48.5
Working Families	Tim Bishop	11,061	4.0
Total	Tim Bishop (incumbent)	146,179	52.5
Republican	Randy Altschuler	107,226	38.5
Conservative	Randy Altschuler	20,125	7.2
Independence	Randy Altschuler	4,953	1.8
Total	Randy Altschuler	132,304	47.5
Total votes		278,483	100.0
Democratic hold			

== District 2 ==
2012 New York's 2nd congressional district election
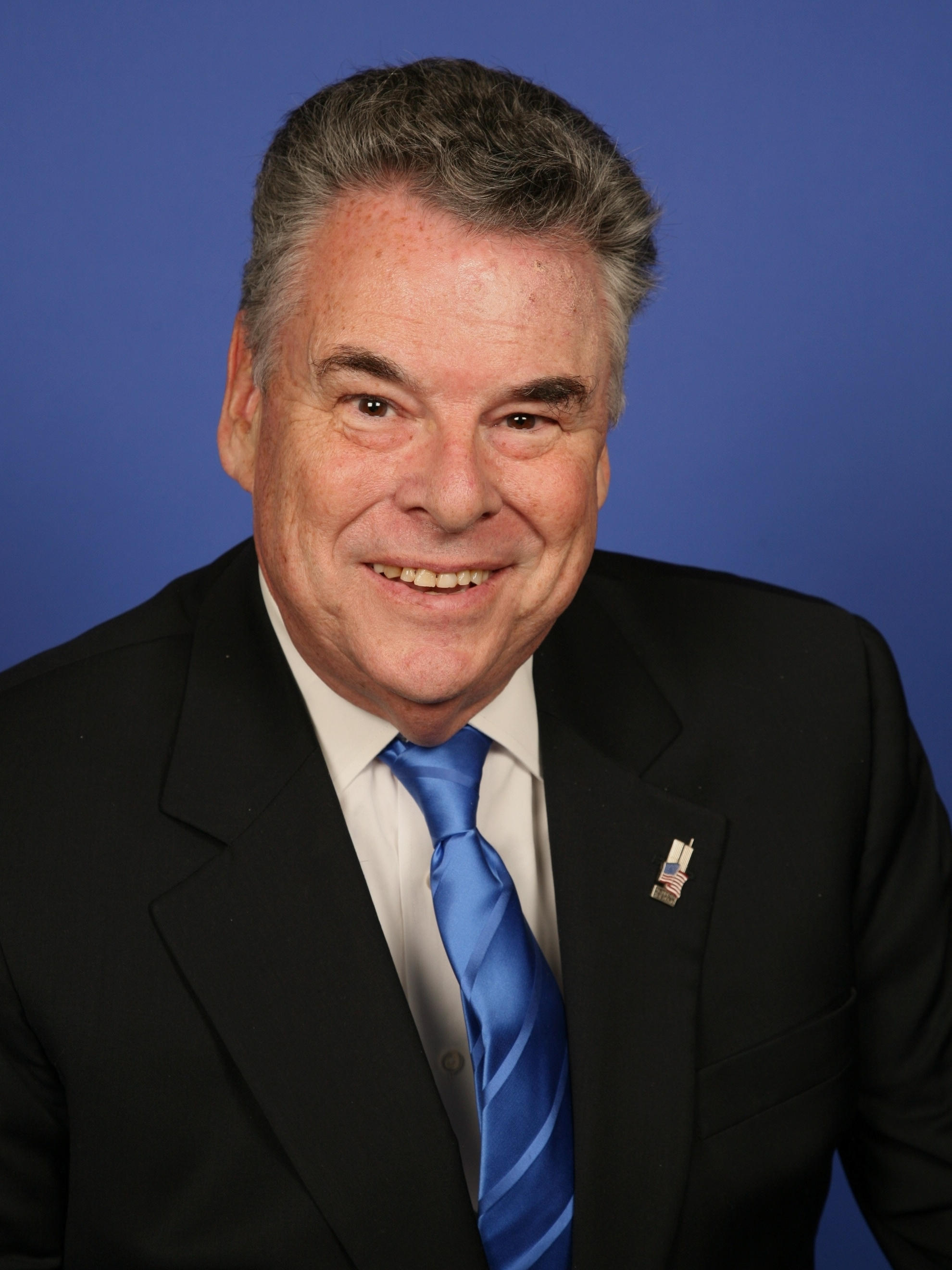

	Majority party	Minority party
Candidate	Peter T. King	Vivianne Falcone
Party	Republican	Democratic
Alliance	Conservative; Independence	Working Families
Popular vote	142,309	100,545
Percentage	58.6%	41.4%
- County results King: 50–60% 70–80%
U.S. Representative before election
Peter T. King (3rd)
Republican
Elected U.S. Representative
Peter T. King
Republican

Republican incumbent Peter King, who was redistricted from the 3rd district, said in May 2011 that the Nassau County Republican Party had encouraged him to run for president. King also said, however, that he was focused "entirely on getting re-elected to Congress."

=== Republican primary ===
==== Candidates ====
===== Nominee =====
- Peter King, incumbent U.S. Representative

===== Disqualified =====
- Paul Mourino

King had the endorsement of the Conservative Party and Independence Party.

=== Democratic primary ===
==== Candidates ====
===== Nominee =====
- Vivianne Falcone, teacher

===== Declined =====
- Kathleen Rice, Nassau County district attorney and candidate for attorney general in 2010

Falcone also had the endorsement of the Working Families Party.

=== General election ===
==== Endorsements ====
Peter King (R)

Labor unions

- International Brotherhood of Boilermakers
- National Association of Letter Carriers

Organizations

- Campaign for Working Families
- National Right to Life Committee
- United States Chamber of Commerce

==== Predictions ====
Source	Ranking	As of
The Cook Political Report	Safe R	November 5, 2012
Rothenberg	Safe R	November 2, 2012
Roll Call	Safe R	November 4, 2012
Sabato's Crystal Ball	Safe R	November 5, 2012
NY Times	Safe R	November 4, 2012
RCP	Safe R	November 4, 2012
The Hill	Safe R	November 4, 2012

==== Results ====
King won re-election by a margin of more than 15%.

New York's 2nd congressional district, 2012
Party	Candidate	Votes	%
Republican	Peter King	116,363	47.9
Conservative	Peter King	19,515	8.0
Independence	Peter King	6,431	2.7
Total	Peter King (incumbent)	142,309	58.6
Democratic	Vivianne Falcone	93,932	38.7
Working Families	Vivianne Falcone	6,613	2.7
Total	Vivianne Falcone	100,545	41.4
Total votes		242,854	100.0
Republican hold			

== District 3 ==
2012 New York's 3rd congressional district election
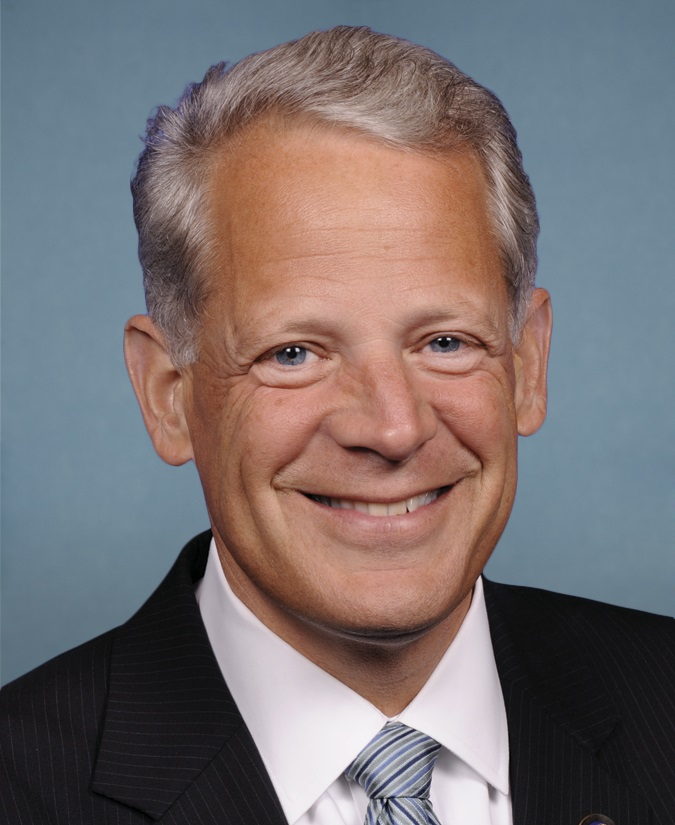

	Majority party	Minority party
Candidate	Steve Israel	Stephen LaBate
Party	Democratic	Republican
Alliance	Independence; Working Families	Conservative
Popular vote	157,880	113,203
Percentage	57.8%	41.5%
- County results Israel: 50–60% 60–70%
U.S. Representative before election
Steve Israel
Democratic
Elected U.S. Representative
Steve Israel
Democratic

Democratic incumbent Steve Israel ran for re-election.

=== Democratic primary ===
==== Candidates ====
===== Nominee =====
- Steve Israel, incumbent U.S. representative

Israel also had the endorsement of the Working Families Party and the Independence Party.

=== Republican primary ===
==== Candidates ====
===== Nominee =====
- Stephen LaBate, U.S. Army reservist and financial planning advisor

===== Disqualified =====
- Robert Previdi, teacher

The Conservative Party also endorsed LaBate.

=== Libertarian primary ===
==== Candidates ====
===== Nominee =====
- Michael McDermott

=== General election ===
==== Endorsements ====
Steve Israel (D)

Labor unions

- AFL–CIO
- International Brotherhood of Boilermakers
- National Association of Letter Carriers
- New York State United Teachers

Organizations

- Sierra Club
Stephen LaBate (R)

Organizations

- Iraq Veterans for Congress
- National Republican Congressional Committee "On the Radar" Program

==== Predictions ====
Source	Ranking	As of
The Cook Political Report	Safe D	November 5, 2012
Rothenberg	Safe D	November 2, 2012
Roll Call	Safe D	November 4, 2012
Sabato's Crystal Ball	Safe D	November 5, 2012
NY Times	Safe D	November 4, 2012
RCP	Safe D	November 4, 2012
The Hill	Safe D	November 4, 2012

==== Results ====
New York's 3rd congressional district, 2012
Party	Candidate	Votes	%
Democratic	Steve Israel	146,271	53.5
Working Families	Steve Israel	6,506	2.4
Independence	Steve Israel	5,103	1.9
Total	Steve Israel (incumbent)	157,880	57.8
Republican	Stephen LaBate	98,614	36.1
Conservative	Stephen LaBate	14,589	5.4
Total	Stephen LaBate	113,203	41.5
Libertarian	Michael McDermott	1,644	0.6
Constitution	Anthony Tolda	367	0.1
Total votes		273,094	100
Democratic hold			

== District 4 ==
2012 New York's 4th congressional district election
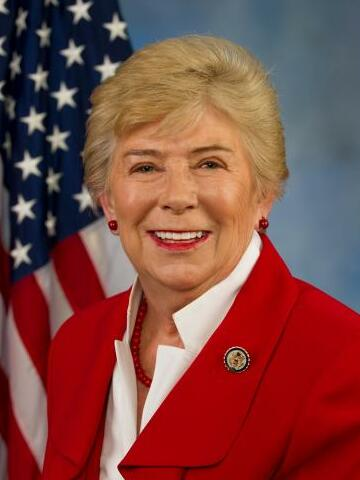

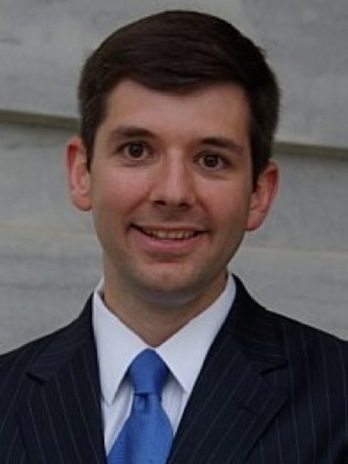
	Majority party	Minority party	Third party
Candidate	Carolyn McCarthy	Fran Becker	Frank Scaturro
Party	Democratic	Republican	Conservative
Alliance	Independence; Working Families	Tax Revolt
Popular vote	163,955	85,693	15,603
Percentage	61.8%	32.3%	5.9%
- County results Mccarthy: 60–70%
U.S. Representative before election
Carolyn McCarthy
Democratic
Elected U.S. Representative
Carolyn McCarthy
Democratic

Incumbent Democrat Carolyn McCarthy, who had represented the district since 1997, ran for re-election. She was re-elected with 53.7% of the vote in 2010. The district had a PVI of D+4.

=== Democratic primary ===
==== Candidates ====
===== Nominee =====
- Carolyn McCarthy, incumbent U.S. representative

The Independence Party and Working Families Party endorsed McCarthy.

=== Republican primary ===
==== Candidates ====
===== Nominee =====
- Fran Becker, Nassau County Legislator and nominee for this seat in 2010

===== Eliminated in primary =====
- Frank Scaturro, lawyer, historian and candidate for this seat in 2010

==== Primary results ====
On June 26, 2012, Nassau County legislator Fran Becker defeated Frank Scaturro in a primary election for the Republican nomination, while Scaturro defeated Becker in the Conservative Party primary as a write-in candidate.

Republican primary results
Party	Candidate	Votes	%
Republican	Fran Becker	6,357	55.1
Republican	Frank Scaturro	5,175	44.9
Total votes		11,532	100.0

Conservative primary results
Party	Candidate	Votes	%
Conservative	Frank Scaturro	253	56.6
Conservative	Fran Becker	194	43.4
Total votes		447	100.0

=== General election ===
==== Endorsements ====
Carolyn McCarthy (D)

Labor unions

- AFL–CIO
- International Brotherhood of Boilermakers
- National Association of Letter Carriers
- New York State United Teachers

Organizations

- National Organization for Women
- Sierra Club
Frank Scaturro (C)

Organizations

- Eagle Forum

==== Predictions ====
Source	Ranking	As of
The Cook Political Report	Safe D	November 5, 2012
Rothenberg	Safe D	November 2, 2012
Roll Call	Safe D	November 4, 2012
Sabato's Crystal Ball	Safe D	November 5, 2012
NY Times	Safe D	November 4, 2012
RCP	Safe D	November 4, 2012
The Hill	Safe D	November 4, 2012

==== Results ====
New York's 4th congressional district, 2012
Party	Candidate	Votes	%
Democratic	Carolyn McCarthy	152,590	57.5
Working Families	Carolyn McCarthy	7,472	2.8
Independence	Carolyn McCarthy	3,893	1.5
Total	Carolyn McCarthy (incumbent)	163,955	61.8
Republican	Fran Becker	84,982	32.0
Tax Revolt	Fran Becker	711	0.3
Total	Fran Becker	85,693	32.3
Conservative	Frank Scaturro	15,603	5.9
Total votes		265,251	100.0
Democratic hold			

== District 5 ==
2012 New York's 5th congressional district election
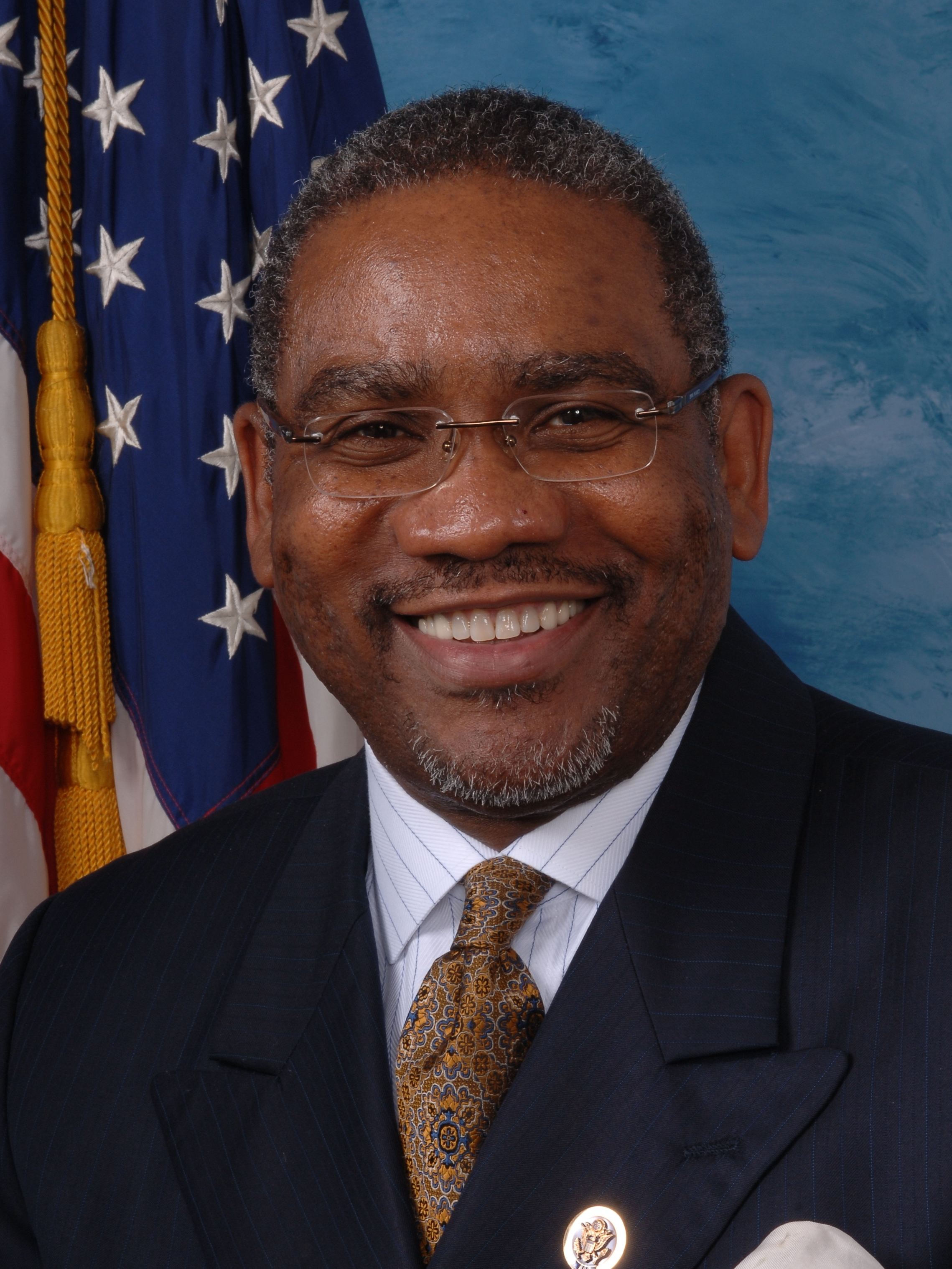

	Majority party	Minority party
Candidate	Gregory Meeks	Alan Jennings
Party	Democratic	Republican
Popular vote	167,836	17,875
Percentage	89.7%	9.6%
- County results Meeks: 70–80% 90–100%
U.S. Representative before election
Gregory Meeks (6th)
Democratic
Elected U.S. Representative
Gregory Meeks
Democratic

Incumbent Democrat Gregory Meeks, who had represented the district since 1998, ran for re-election. He was re-elected with 87.8% of the vote in 2010. The district had a PVI of D+33.

=== Democratic primary ===
==== Candidates ====
===== Nominee =====
- Gregory Meeks, incumbent U.S. representative

===== Eliminated in primary =====
- Alan Jennings, former New York City Council member
- Joseph Marthone, small-business owner
- Michael Scala, rapper

==== Primary results ====
Democratic primary results
Party	Candidate	Votes	%
Democratic	Gregory Meeks (incumbent)	9,920	66.5
Democratic	Alan Jennings	1,972	13.2
Democratic	Michael Scala	1,694	11.4
Democratic	Joseph Marthone	1,327	8.9
Total votes		14,913	100.0

=== Republican primary ===
==== Candidates ====
===== Nominee =====
- Alan Jennings, former New York City Council member

=== Libertarian primary ===
==== Candidates ====
===== Nominee =====
- Catherine Wark

=== General election ===
==== Endorsements ====
Gregory Meeks (D)

Labor unions

- AFL–CIO
- International Brotherhood of Boilermakers
- National Association of Letter Carriers
- New York State United Teachers

Organizations

- Sierra Club

==== Predictions ====
Source	Ranking	As of
The Cook Political Report	Safe D	November 5, 2012
Rothenberg	Safe D	November 2, 2012
Roll Call	Safe D	November 4, 2012
Sabato's Crystal Ball	Safe D	November 5, 2012
NY Times	Safe D	November 4, 2012
RCP	Safe D	November 4, 2012
The Hill	Safe D	November 4, 2012

==== Results ====
New York's 5th congressional district, 2012
Party	Candidate	Votes	%
Democratic	Gregory Meeks (incumbent)	167,836	89.7
Republican	Alan Jennings	17,875	9.6
Libertarian	Catherine Wark	1,345	0.7
Total votes		187,056	100.0
Democratic hold			

== District 6 ==
2012 New York's 6th congressional district election
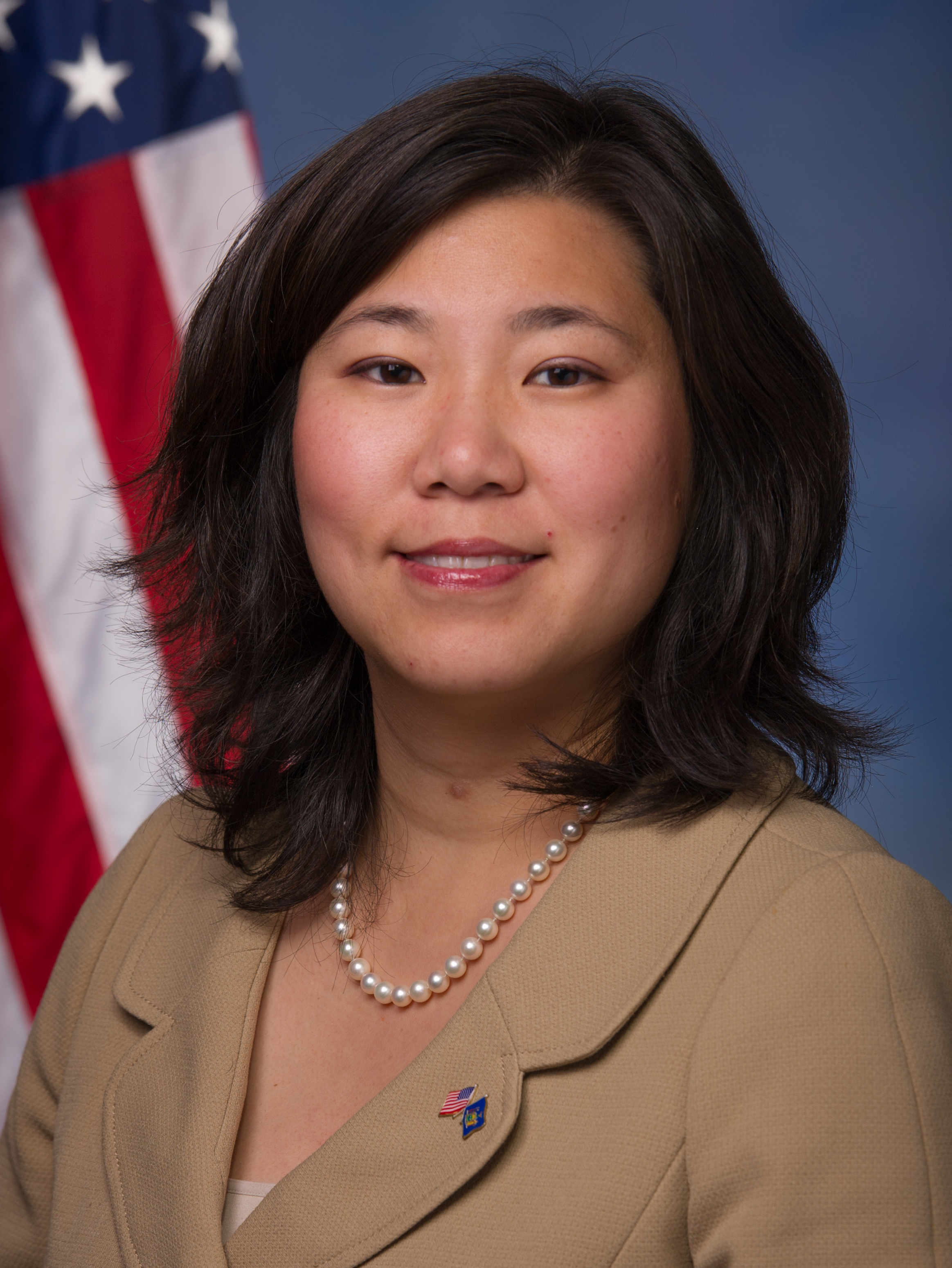

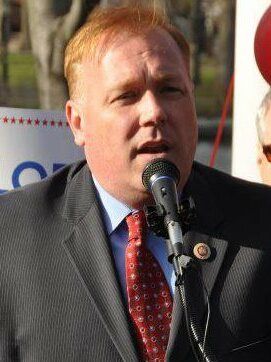
	Majority party	Minority party
Candidate	Grace Meng	Dan Halloran
Party	Democratic	Republican
Alliance	Working Families	Conservative
Popular vote	111,501	50,846
Percentage	67.9%	31.0%
- County results Meng: 60–70%
U.S. Representative before election
Bob Turner (9th)
Republican
Elected U.S. Representative
Grace Meng
Democratic

The 6th district was an open seat, consisting mostly of territory from the former 5th and 9th districts. Neither of the two incumbents in those districts, Democrat Gary Ackerman from the 5th and Republican Bob Turner from the 9th, sought re-election. Ackerman retired, while Turner, who represented 51% the voters of the new seat, dropped out of the race in March 2012 to run against incumbent Democrat Kirsten Gillibrand in the Senate election.

=== Republican primary ===
==== Candidates ====
===== Nominee =====
- Dan Halloran, New York City Council member

===== Withdrawn =====
- Bob Turner, incumbent U.S. representative

=== Democratic primary ===
==== Candidates ====
===== Nominee =====
- Grace Meng, state assembly member

===== Eliminated in primary =====
- Elizabeth Crowley, New York City Council member
- Rory Lancman, state assembly member
- Robert Mittman, doctor

===== Declined =====
- Gary Ackerman, incumbent U.S. representative
- David Weprin, state assembly member and nominee for this seat in 2011

==== Endorsements ====
Grace Meng

Newspapers

- The New York Times

==== Primary results ====
Democratic primary results
Party	Candidate	Votes	%
Democratic	Grace Meng	14,825	53.0
Democratic	Rory Lancman	7,089	25.3
Democratic	Elizabeth Crowley	4,606	16.5
Democratic	Robert Mittman	1,462	5.2
Total votes		27,982	100.0

The Working Families Party endorsed Lancman.

=== Green primary ===
==== Candidates ====
===== Nominee =====
- Evergreen Chou

=== General election ===
==== Endorsements ====
Grace Meng (D)

Labor unions

- AFL–CIO
- International Brotherhood of Boilermakers
- National Association of Letter Carriers
- New York State United Teachers

Organizations

- EMILY's List
- National Organization for Women
- Sierra Club

==== Predictions ====
Source	Ranking	As of
The Cook Political Report	Safe D	November 5, 2012
Rothenberg	Safe D	November 2, 2012
Roll Call	Safe D	November 4, 2012
Sabato's Crystal Ball	Safe D	November 5, 2012
NY Times	Safe D	November 4, 2012
RCP	Safe D	November 4, 2012
The Hill	Safe D	November 4, 2012

==== Results ====
New York's 6th congressional district, 2012
Party	Candidate	Votes	%
Democratic	Grace Meng	107,507	65.5
Working Families	Grace Meng	3,994	2.4
Total	Grace Meng	111,501	67.9
Republican	Dan Halloran	45,993	28.0
Conservative	Dan Halloran	4,853	3.0
Total	Dan Halloran	50,846	31.0
Green	Evergreen Chou	1,913	1.2
Total votes		164,260	100.0
Democratic hold			

== District 7 ==
2012 New York's 7th congressional district election
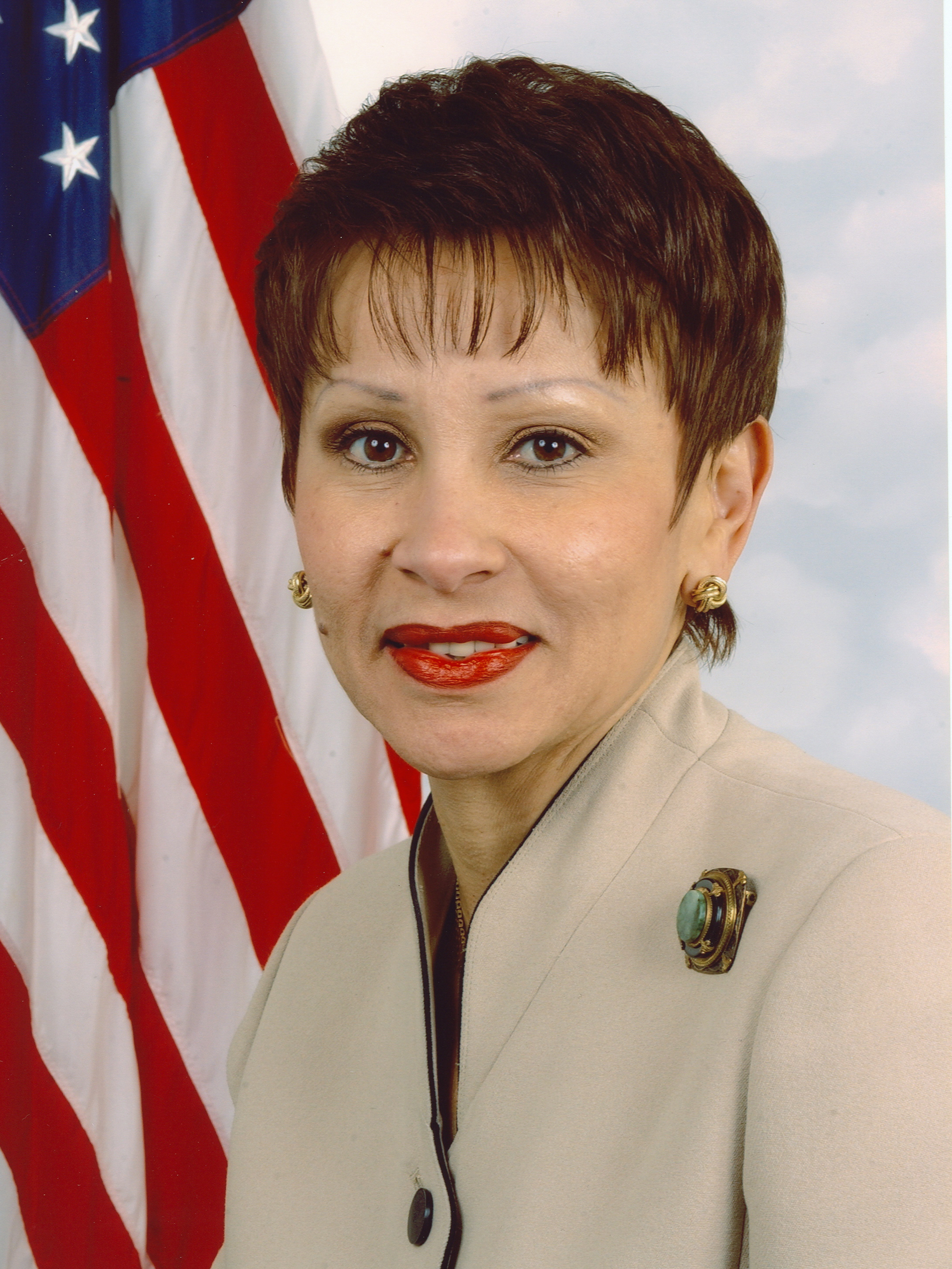

	Majority party	Minority party
Candidate	Nydia Velázquez	James Murray
Party	Democratic	Conservative
Alliance	Working Families
Popular vote	143,930	7,971
Percentage	94.8%	5.2%
U.S. Representative before election
Nydia Velázquez (12th)
Democratic
Elected U.S. Representative
Nydia Velázquez
Democratic

Incumbent Nydia Velázquez, who was redistricted from the 12th district, ran for re-election.

=== Democratic primary ===
New York City Councilman Erik Martin Dilan, the son of current New York State Senator Martin Malave Dilan, challenged Velázquez in the primary with the backing of Brooklyn Democratic Party chair Vito Lopez; the Dilan family and Velázquez supporters had been engaged in a political feud for several years.

==== Candidates ====
===== Nominee =====
- Nydia Velázquez, incumbent U.S. representative

===== Eliminated in primary =====
- Erik Martin Dilan, New York City Council member
- George Martinez, member of the Occupy Wall Street movement
- Dan O'Connor, economist

==== Endorsements ====
Erik Dilan

State officials

- Eric Adams, state senator
- Alec Brook-Krasny, state assemblyman
- Karim Camara, state assemblyman
- Nelson Castro, state assemblyman
- Marcos Crespo, state assemblyman
- Martin Malave Dilan, state senator (candidate's father)
- Rafael Espinal, state assemblyman
- Micah Kellner, state assemblyman
- Joe Lentol, state assemblymn
- Vito J. Lopez, state assemblyman and Chairman of the Brooklyn Democratic Party
- Naomi Rivera, state assemblywoman
- John L. Sampson, state senator and Minority Leader of New York State Senate

Local officials

- Sara M. Gonzalez, NYC Councilor
- Stephen Levin, NYC Councilor

Individuals

- Zalman Teitelbaum, rabbi

Labor unions

- N.Y.C. District Council of Carpenters
Nydia Velázquez

Executive officials

- Barack Obama, President of the United States

Federal officials

- Jerry Nadler, U.S. Representative from NY-10
- Chuck Schumer, U.S. Senator from New York

Statewide officials

- Andrew Cuomo, Governor of New York

State officials

- James F. Brennan, state assemblyman
- Michael DenDekker, state assemblyman
- Joan Millman, state assemblywoman
- Sheldon Silver, Speaker of the New York State Assembly
- David Weprin, state assemblyman

Local officials

- Ed Koch, former Mayor of New York City
- Brad Lander, NYC Councilor
- Marty Markowitz, Brooklyn Borough President

Individuals

- Moishe Indig, rabbi
- Lincoln Restler, activist and district leader
- Aaron Teitelbaum, rabbi

Newspapers & publications

- New York Daily News
- The New York Times

==== Primary results ====

Velazquez

40–50%
50–60%
60–70%
70–80%
80–90%
90–100%

Dilan

40–50%
50–60%
60–70%
70–80%
80–90%

O'Connor

60–70%

Martinez

90–100%

Other

20–30% tie
40–50% tie
50% tie
No votes

Democratic primary results
Party	Candidate	Votes	%
Democratic	Nydia Velázquez (incumbent)	17,208	57.9
Democratic	Erik Dilan	10,408	35.0
Democratic	Daniel O'Connor	1,351	4.6
Democratic	George Martinez	745	2.5
Total votes		29,712	100.0

=== Conservative primary ===
==== Candidates ====
===== Nominee =====
- James Murray

=== General election ===
==== Endorsements ====
Nydia Velázquez (D)

Labor unions

- AFL–CIO
- International Brotherhood of Boilermakers
- National Association of Letter Carriers
- New York State United Teachers

Organizations

- National Organization for Women
- Sierra Club

==== Predictions ====
Source	Ranking	As of
The Cook Political Report	Safe D	November 5, 2012
Rothenberg	Safe D	November 2, 2012
Roll Call	Safe D	November 4, 2012
Sabato's Crystal Ball	Safe D	November 5, 2012
NY Times	Safe D	November 4, 2012
RCP	Safe D	November 4, 2012
The Hill	Safe D	November 4, 2012

==== Results ====
New York's 7th congressional district, 2012
Party	Candidate	Votes	%
Democratic	Nydia Velázquez	134,802	88.8
Working Families	Nydia Velázquez	9,128	6.0
Total	Nydia Velázquez (incumbent)	143,930	94.8
Conservative	James Murray	7,971	5.2
Total votes		151,901	100.0
Democratic hold			

== District 8 ==
2012 New York's 8th congressional district election
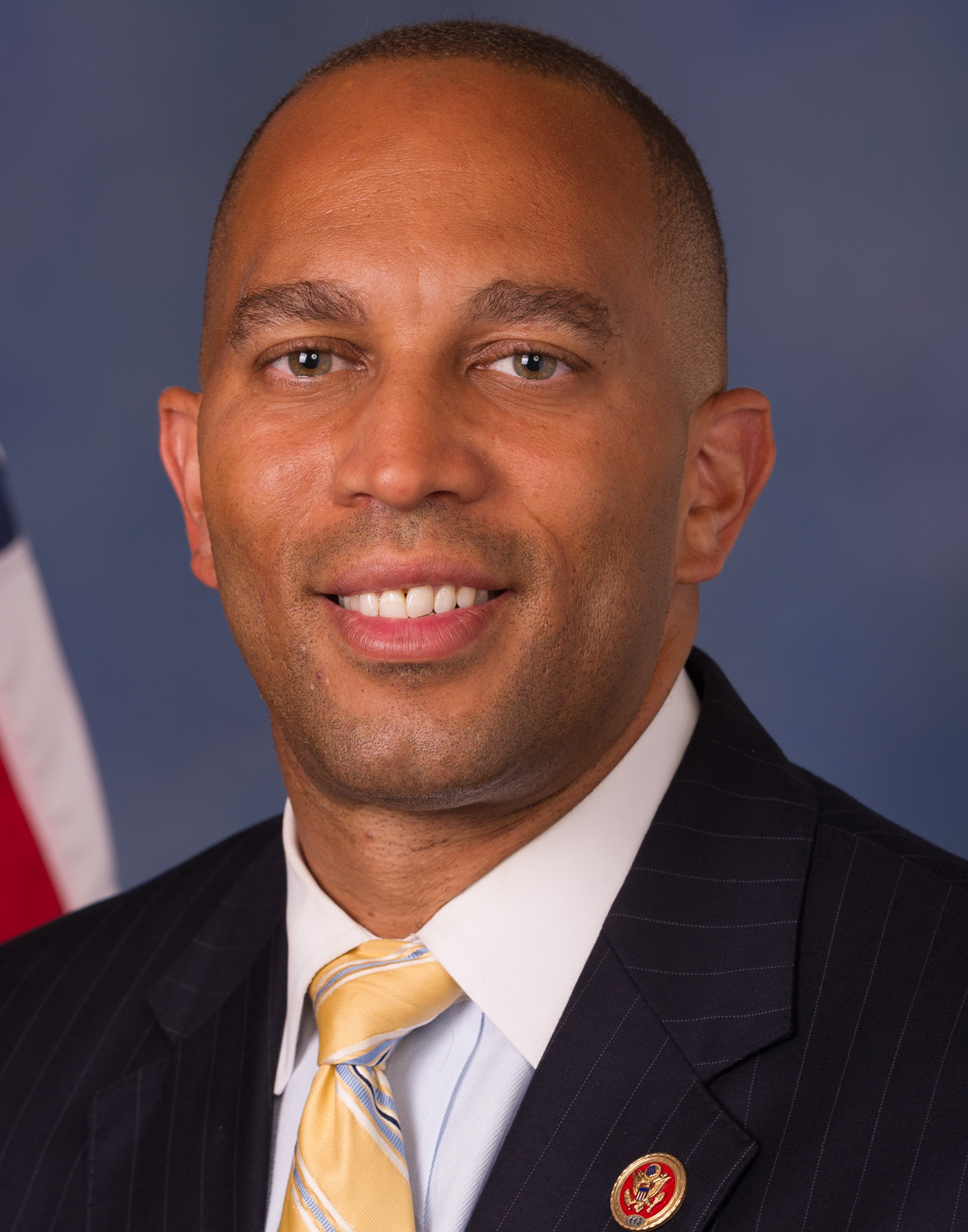

	Majority party	Minority party
Candidate	Hakeem Jeffries	Alan Bellone
Party	Democratic	Republican
Alliance	Working Families	Conservative
Popular vote	184,039	17,650
Percentage	90.1%	8.7%
- County results Jeffries: 50–60% 90–100%
U.S. Representative before election
Edolphus Towns (10th)
Democratic
Elected U.S. Representative
Hakeem Jeffries
Democratic

Incumbent Democrat Edolphus Towns, who was redistricted from the 10th district and was first elected in 1982, announced in April 2012 that he would abandon his plans for re-election.

=== Democratic primary ===
Towns's son Darryl, a former member of the New York State Assembly, was formerly considered the "next in line" for the seat; however, in 2011 he accepted a position in the administration of Governor Andrew Cuomo.

==== Candidates ====
===== Nominee =====
- Hakeem Jeffries, state assembly member

===== Eliminated in primary =====
- Charles Barron, New York City Council member and candidate for the 10th district in 2006

===== Declined =====
- Letitia James, New York City Council member
- Kevin Powell, activist, former star of The Real World: New York and candidate for the 10th district in 2008 & 2010
- Darryl Towns, former state assembly member and son of Edolphus Towns
- Edolphus Towns, incumbent U.S. representative

==== Endorsements ====
Hakeem Jeffries

Newspapers

- The New York Times

==== Primary results ====
Democratic primary results
Party	Candidate	Votes	%
Democratic	Hakeem Jeffries	28,271	71.8
Democratic	Charles Barron	11,130	28.2
Total votes		39,401	100.0

=== Green primary ===
==== Candidates ====
===== Nominee =====
- Colin Beavan, subject of the book and film No Impact Man

=== Republican primary ===
==== Candidates ====
===== Nominee =====
- Alan Bellone

=== General election ===
==== Endorsements ====
Hakeem Jeffries (D)

Labor unions

- AFL–CIO
- International Brotherhood of Boilermakers

Organizations

- Democratic Congressional Campaign Committee "Majority Makers" Program
- Sierra Club

==== Predictions ====
Source	Ranking	As of
The Cook Political Report	Safe D	November 5, 2012
Rothenberg	Safe D	November 2, 2012
Roll Call	Safe D	November 4, 2012
Sabato's Crystal Ball	Safe D	November 5, 2012
NY Times	Safe D	November 4, 2012
RCP	Safe D	November 4, 2012
The Hill	Safe D	November 4, 2012

==== Results ====
New York's 8th congressional district, 2012
Party	Candidate	Votes	%
Democratic	Hakeem Jeffries	178,688	87.5
Working Families	Hakeem Jeffries	5,351	2.6
Total	Hakeem Jeffries	184,039	90.1
Republican	Alan Bellone	15,841	7.8
Conservative	Alan Bellone	1,809	0.9
Total	Alan Bellone	17,650	8.7
Green	Colin Beavan	2,441	1.2
Total votes		204,130	100.0
Democratic hold			

== District 9 ==
2012 New York's 9th congressional district election
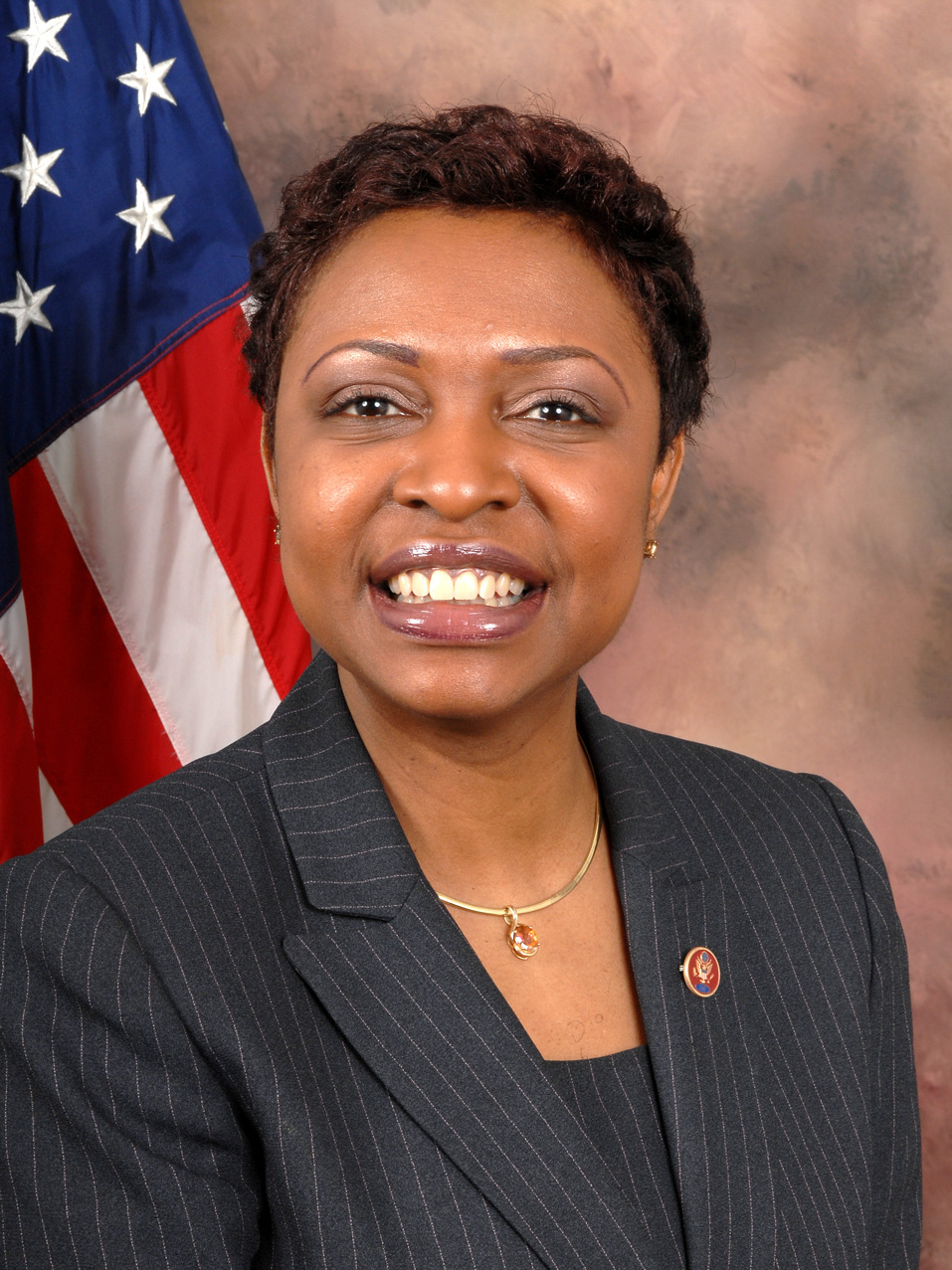

	Majority party	Minority party
Candidate	Yvette Clarke	Daniel J. Cavanagh
Party	Democratic	Republican
Alliance	Working Families	Conservative
Popular vote	186,141	24,164
Percentage	87.2%	11.3%
- County results Clarke: 80–90%
U.S. Representative before election
Yvette Clarke (11th)
Democratic
Elected U.S. Representative
Yvette Clarke
Democratic

Democrat Yvette Clarke, who was redistricted from the 11th district and had represented that district since 2007, sought re-election in her new district.

=== Democratic primary ===
Sylvia Kinard, an attorney and the ex-wife of Bill Thompson (a current/former Democratic nominee for mayor of New York City), challenged Clarke.

==== Candidates ====
===== Nominee =====
- Yvette Clarke, incumbent U.S. representative

===== Eliminated in primary =====
- Sylvia Kinard, attorney

==== Primary results ====
Democratic primary results
Party	Candidate	Votes	%
Democratic	Yvette Clarke	15,069	88.3
Democratic	Sylvia Kinard	1,993	11.7
Total votes		17,062	100.0

=== Republican primary ===
==== Candidates ====
===== Nominee =====
- Daniel Cavanaugh

=== General election ===
==== Endorsements ====
Yvette Clarke (D)

Labor unions

- AFL–CIO
- International Brotherhood of Boilermakers
- National Association of Letter Carriers
- New York State United Teachers

Organizations

- National Organization for Women
- Sierra Club

==== Predictions ====
Source	Ranking	As of
The Cook Political Report	Safe D	November 5, 2012
Rothenberg	Safe D	November 2, 2012
Roll Call	Safe D	November 4, 2012
Sabato's Crystal Ball	Safe D	November 5, 2012
NY Times	Safe D	November 4, 2012
RCP	Safe D	November 4, 2012
The Hill	Safe D	November 4, 2012

==== Results ====
New York's 9th congressional district, 2012
Party	Candidate	Votes	%
Democratic	Yvette Clarke	178,168	83.5
Working Families	Yvette Clarke	7,973	3.7
Total	Yvette Clarke (incumbent)	186,141	87.2
Republican	Daniel Cavanaugh	20,899	9.8
Conservative	Daniel Cavanaugh	3,265	1.5
Total	Daniel Cavanaugh	24,164	11.3
Green	Vivia Morgan	2,991	1.5
Total votes		213,296	100.0
Democratic hold			

== District 10 ==
2012 New York's 10th congressional district election
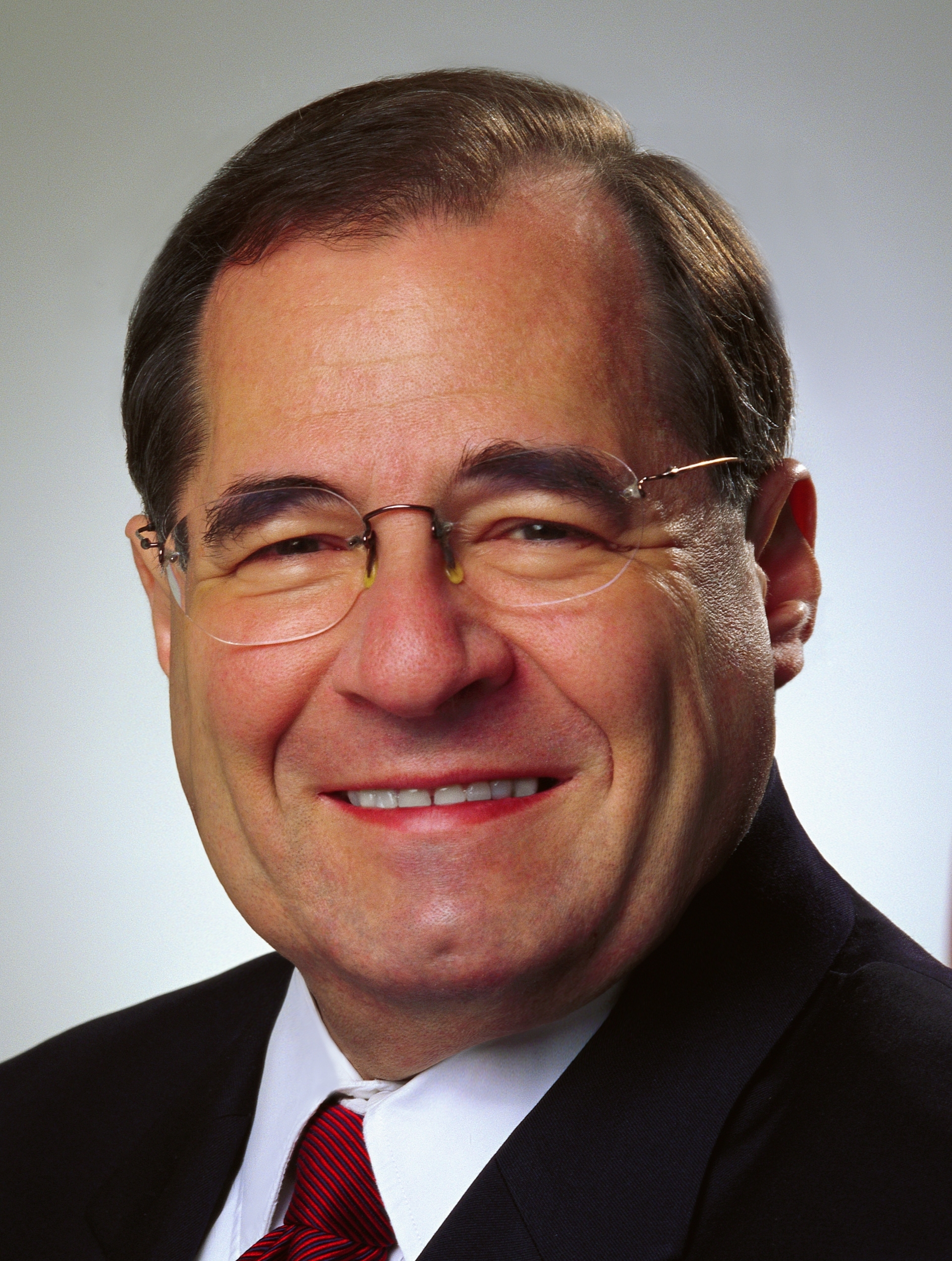

	Majority party	Minority party
Candidate	Jerrold Nadler	Michael Chan
Party	Democratic	Republican
Alliance	Working Families	Conservative
Popular vote	165,743	39,413
Percentage	80.7%	19.2%
- County results Nadler: 60–70% 80–90%
U.S. Representative before election
Jerrold Nadler (8th)
Democratic
Elected U.S. Representative
Jerrold Nadler
Democratic

The new 10th district is located in New York City and includes the Upper West Side of Manhattan, the west side of Lower Manhattan, including Greenwich Village and the Financial District, and parts of Brooklyn, including Borough Park. Incumbent Democrat Jerrold Nadler, who had represented the 8th district since 1993 and the 17th district from 1992 to 1993, ran for re-election. He was re-elected in 2010 with 76% of the vote, and the district had a PVI of D+24.

=== Democratic primary ===
==== Candidates ====
===== Nominee =====
- Jerrold Nadler, incumbent U.S. representative

=== Republican primary ===
==== Candidates ====
===== Nominee =====
- Michael Chan, economics professor at New York University

=== General election ===
==== Endorsements ====
Jerrold Nadler (D)

Labor unions

- AFL–CIO
- International Brotherhood of Boilermakers
- National Association of Letter Carriers
- New York State United Teachers

Organizations

- National Organization for Women
- Sierra Club

==== Predictions ====
Source	Ranking	As of
The Cook Political Report	Safe D	November 5, 2012
Rothenberg	Safe D	November 2, 2012
Roll Call	Safe D	November 4, 2012
Sabato's Crystal Ball	Safe D	November 5, 2012
NY Times	Safe D	November 4, 2012
RCP	Safe D	November 4, 2012
The Hill	Safe D	November 4, 2012

==== Results ====
New York's 10th congressional district, 2012
Party	Candidate	Votes	%
Democratic	Jerrold Nadler	156,619	76.3
Working Families	Jerrold Nadler	9,124	4.4
Total	Jerrold Nadler (incumbent)	165,743	80.7
Republican	Michael Chan	35,538	17.3
Conservative	Michael Chan	3,875	1.9
Total	Michael Chan	39,413	19.2
Total votes		205,156	100.0
Democratic hold			

== District 11 ==
2012 New York's 11th congressional district election
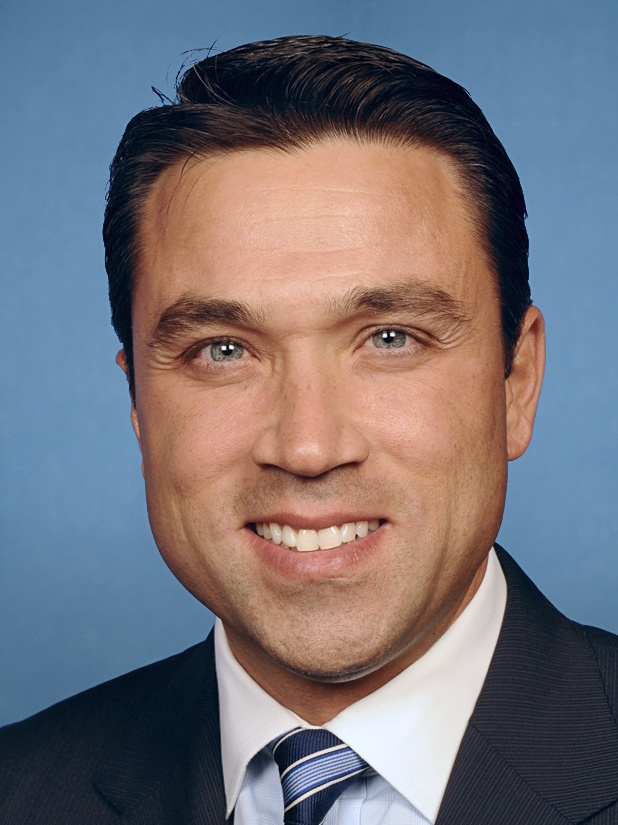

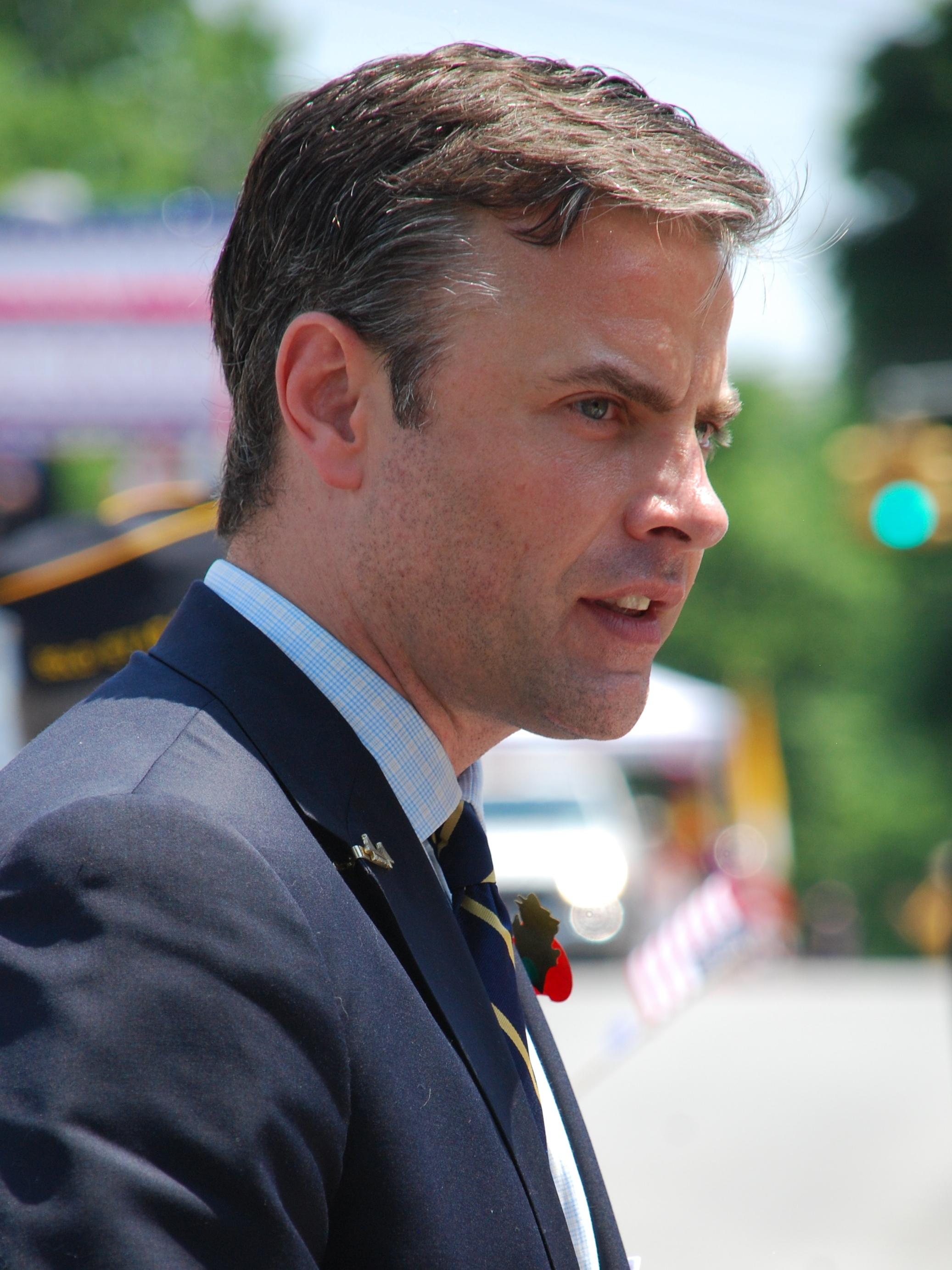
	Majority party	Minority party
Candidate	Michael Grimm	Mark Murphy
Party	Republican	Democratic
Alliance	Conservative	Working Families
Popular vote	103,118	92,430
Percentage	52.2%	46.8%
- County results Grimm: 50–60% Murphy: 50–60%
U.S. Representative before election
Michael Grimm (13th)
Republican
Elected U.S. Representative
Michael Grimm
Republican

Incumbent Republican Michael Grimm, who was redistricted from the 13th district and was first elected in 2010, sought re-election.

=== Republican primary ===
==== Candidates ====
===== Nominee =====
- Michael Grimm, incumbent U.S. representative

===== Declined =====
- Vito Fossella, former U.S. representative

=== Democratic primary ===
==== Candidates ====
===== Nominee =====
- Mark Murphy, former aide to New York City Public Advocate Bill de Blasio

===== Withdrawn =====
- Alex Borgognone, restaurateur

===== Declined =====
- Mike Cusick, state assembly member
- Robert Diamond, investment banker
- John Gangemi, former New York City Council member
- Vincent J. Gentile, New York City Council member
- Michael McMahon, former U.S. representative
- Debi Rose, New York City Council member
- Diane Savino, state senator
- Stephen Yodice, telecommunications executive

=== Green primary ===
==== Candidates ====
===== Nominee =====
- Henry "Hank" Bardel

=== General election ===
==== Endorsements ====
Michael Grimm (R)

Labor unions

- International Brotherhood of Boilermakers
- National Association of Letter Carriers

Organizations

- National Republican Congressional Committee "Patriot" Program
- National Right to Life Committee
- United States Chamber of Commerce
Mark Murphy (D)

Organizations

- Democratic Congressional Campaign Committee "Red to Blue" Program
- National Organization for Women
- Sierra Club

Newspapers

- The New York Times

==== Polling ====
Poll source	Date(s) administered	Sample size	Margin of error	Michael Grimm (R)	Mark Murphy (D)	Henry Bardel (G)	Undecided
Siena College	October 27–28, 2012	627	± 3.9%	52%	34%	5%	9%
Siena College	September 19–23, 2012	621	± 3.9%	48%	38%	6%	8%
Global Strategy (D-Murphy)	June 22–25, 2012	400	± 4.9%	47%	32%	—	21%

==== Predictions ====
Source	Ranking	As of
The Cook Political Report	Likely R	November 5, 2012
Rothenberg	Lean R	November 2, 2012
Roll Call	Likely R	November 4, 2012
Sabato's Crystal Ball	Likely R	November 5, 2012
NY Times	Tossup	November 4, 2012
RCP	Likely R	November 4, 2012
The Hill	Likely R	November 4, 2012

==== Results ====
Grimm won re-election by a margin of 52.8% to 46.2%.

New York's 11th congressional district, 2012
Party	Candidate	Votes	%
Republican	Michael Grimm	91,030	46.1
Conservative	Michael Grimm	12,088	6.1
Total	Michael Grimm (incumbent)	103,118	52.2
Democratic	Mark Murphy	87,720	44.4
Working Families	Mark Murphy	4,710	2.4
Total	Mark Murphy	92,430	46.8
Green	Henry Bardel	1,939	1.0
Total votes		197,487	100.0
Republican hold			

== District 12 ==
2012 New York's 12th congressional district election
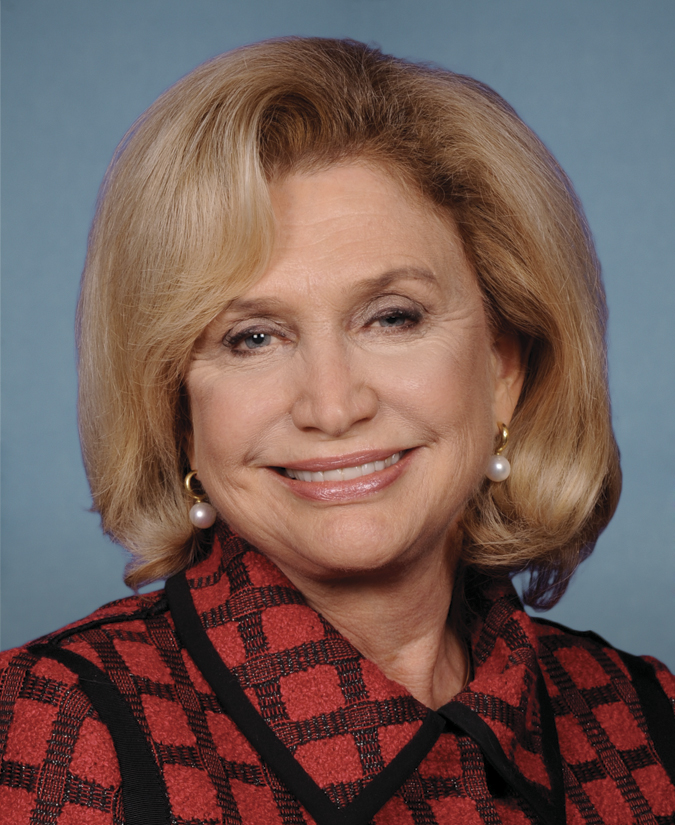

	Majority party	Minority party
Candidate	Carolyn Maloney	Christopher Wight
Party	Democratic	Republican
Alliance	Working Families	Independence; Conservative
Popular vote	194,370	46,841
Percentage	80.6%	19.4%
- County results Maloney: 70–80% 80–90%
U.S. Representative before election
Carolyn Maloney (14th)
Democratic
Elected U.S. Representative
Carolyn Maloney
Democratic

Incumbent Carolyn Maloney, who was redistricted from the 14th district, ran for re-election.

=== Democratic primary ===
==== Candidates ====
===== Nominee =====
- Carolyn Maloney, incumbent U.S. representative

===== Declined =====
- Reshma Saujani, lawyer, civil servant, nonprofit founder and candidate for this seat in 2010

=== Republican primary ===
==== Candidates ====
===== Nominee =====
- Christopher Wight, investor

=== General election ===
==== Endorsements ====
Carolyn Maloney (D)

Labor unions

- AFL–CIO
- International Brotherhood of Boilermakers
- National Association of Letter Carriers
- New York State United Teachers

Organizations

- National Organization for Women
- Sierra Club

==== Predictions ====
Source	Ranking	As of
The Cook Political Report	Safe D	November 5, 2012
Rothenberg	Safe D	November 2, 2012
Roll Call	Safe D	November 4, 2012
Sabato's Crystal Ball	Safe D	November 5, 2012
NY Times	Safe D	November 4, 2012
RCP	Safe D	November 4, 2012
The Hill	Safe D	November 4, 2012

==== Results ====
New York's 12th congressional district, 2012
Party	Candidate	Votes	%
Democratic	Carolyn Maloney	185,757	77.0
Working Families	Carolyn Maloney	8,613	3.6
Total	Carolyn Maloney (incumbent)	194,370	80.6
Republican	Christopher Wight	42,110	17.5
Independence	Christopher Wight	2,474	1.0
Conservative	Christopher Wight	2,257	0.9
Total	Christopher Wight	46,841	19.4
Total votes		241,211	100.0
Democratic hold			

== District 13 ==
2012 New York's 13th congressional district election
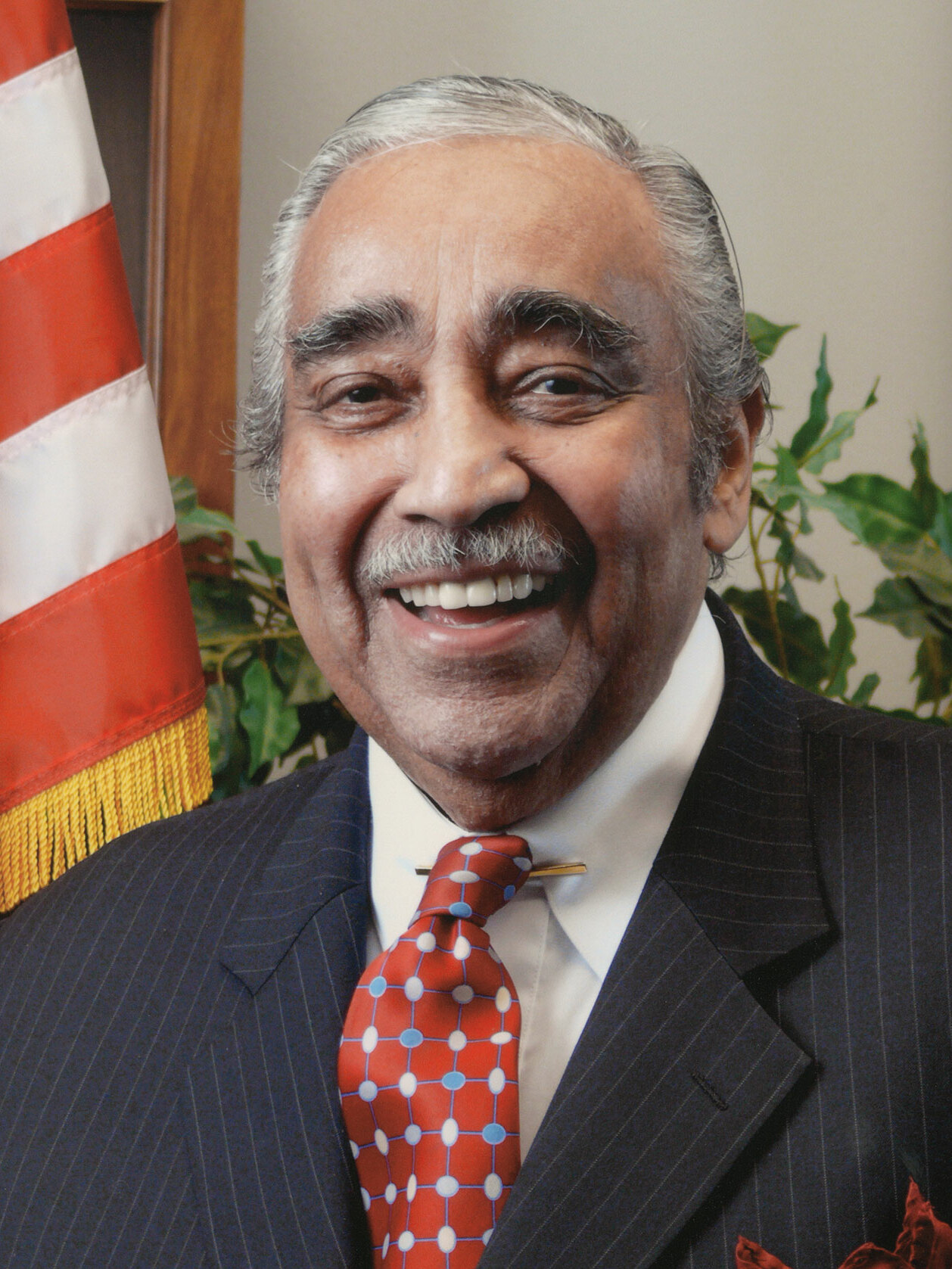

	Majority party	Minority party
Candidate	Charles Rangel	Craig Schley
Party	Democratic	Republican
Alliance	Working Families
Popular vote	175,016	12,147
Percentage	90.8%	6.3%
- County results Rangel: 90–100%
U.S. Representative before election
Charles Rangel
Democratic
Elected U.S. Representative
Charles Rangel
Democratic

Incumbent Democrat Charles B. Rangel, who was redistricted from the 15th district and was censured by the House of Representatives after being found guilty of ethics violations, filed to run for re-election in February 2011.

=== Democratic primary ===
==== Candidates ====
===== Nominee =====
- Charles B. Rangel, incumbent U.S. representative

===== Eliminated in primary =====
- Adriano Espaillat, state senator
- Joyce Johnson, New York City government employee
- Craig Schley, community activist
- Clyde Williams, former adviser to Bill Clinton and former political director of the Democratic National Committee

===== Withdrawn =====
- Vincent Morgan, former member of Rangel's congressional staff and candidate for this seat in 2010

===== Declined =====
- Adam Clayton Powell IV, former state assembly member and candidate for this seat in 1994 & 2010
- Robert J. Rodriguez, state assembly member
- Keith Wright, state assembly member

==== Endorsements ====
Clyde Williams

Newspapers

- New York Daily News
- The New York Times

==== Primary results ====
On the night of the June 26 primary, it seemed as though the incumbent Rangel had defeated his closest challenger, State Senator Espaillat, by a 45%-40% margin; Rangel celebrated victory, and Espaillat conceded defeat. However, as the counting continued, that margin narrowed considerably. A number of precincts were very late in reporting, and Espaillat went to court, claiming irregularities in that his supporters had been improperly turned away from polling locations. On Saturday, July 7, 2012, Rangel received the primary victory by a margin of 990 votes. The New York City Board of Elections released the results that Rangel had received 18,940 votes, and Espaillat had received 17,950. On July 9, 2012, Espaillat conceded the election to Rangel.

Democratic primary results
Party	Candidate	Votes	%
Democratic	Charlie Rangel (incumbent)	19,187	44.4
Democratic	Adriano Espaillat	18,101	41.9
Democratic	Clyde Williams	4,266	9.9
Democratic	Joyce Johnson	1,018	2.4
Democratic	Craig Schley	598	1.4
Total votes		43,170	100.00

=== Republican primary ===
==== Candidates ====
===== Nominee =====
- Craig Schley, community activist

=== General election ===
==== Endorsements ====
Charlie Rangel (D)

Labor unions

- AFL–CIO
- International Brotherhood of Boilermakers
- National Association of Letter Carriers
- New York State United Teachers

Organizations

- Sierra Club

==== Predictions ====
Source	Ranking	As of
The Cook Political Report	Safe D	November 5, 2012
Rothenberg	Safe D	November 2, 2012
Roll Call	Safe D	November 4, 2012
Sabato's Crystal Ball	Safe D	November 5, 2012
NY Times	Safe D	November 4, 2012
RCP	Safe D	November 4, 2012
The Hill	Safe D	November 4, 2012

==== Results ====
New York's 13th congressional district, 2012
Party	Candidate	Votes	%
Democratic	Charlie Rangel	170,690	88.6
Working Families	Charlie Rangel	4,326	2.2
Total	Charlie Rangel (incumbent)	175,016	90.8
Republican	Craig Schley	12,147	6.3
Socialist	Deborah Liatos	5,548	2.9
Total votes		192,711	100.0
Democratic hold			

== District 14 ==
2012 New York's 14th congressional district election
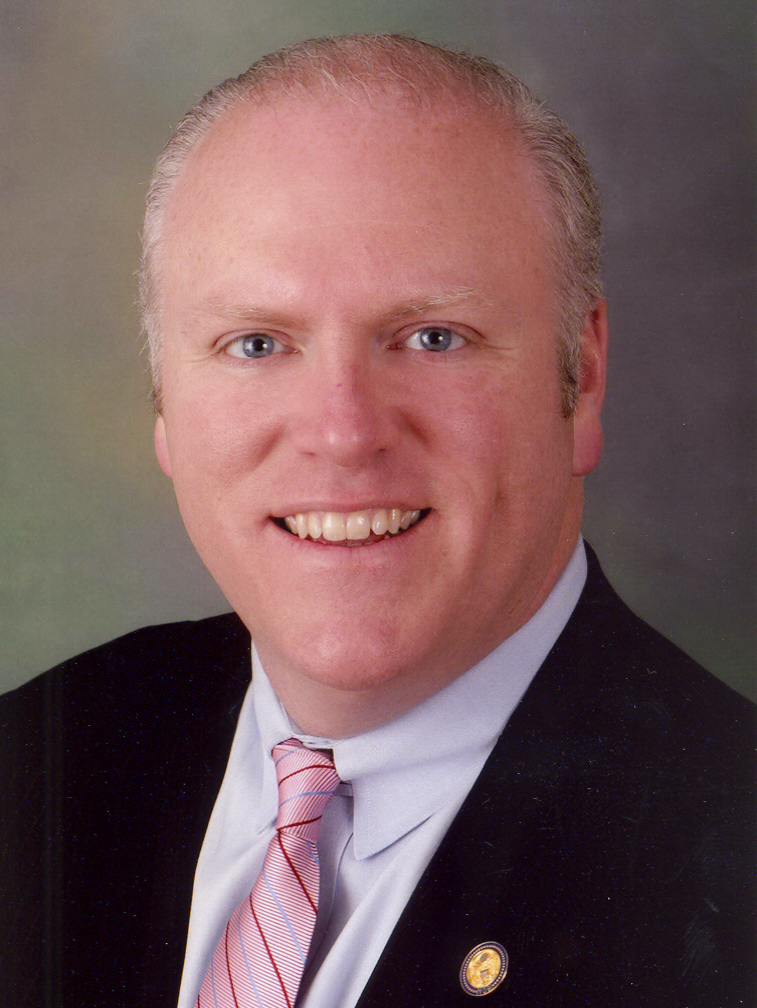

	Majority party	Minority party
Candidate	Joseph Crowley	William Gibbons
Party	Democratic	Republican
Alliance	Working Families	Conservative
Popular vote	120,761	21,755
Percentage	83.2%	15.0%
- County results Crowley: 80–90%
U.S. Representative before election
Joseph Crowley
Democratic
Elected U.S. Representative
Joseph Crowley
Democratic

The redrawn 14th district runs from Newtown Creek in Sunnyside and over LaGuardia Airport and over the three Long Island Sound bridges to the Pelham, Westchester, border. Incumbent Democrat Joe Crowley, who had been redistricted from the 7th district, ran for re-election.

=== Democratic primary ===
==== Candidates ====
===== Nominee =====
- Joe Crowley, incumbent U.S. representative

===== Declined =====
- Rubén Díaz Sr., state senator

=== Republican primary ===
==== Candidates ====
===== Nominee =====
- William Gibbons

=== General election ===
==== Endorsements ====
Joe Crowley (D)

Labor unions

- AFL–CIO
- International Brotherhood of Boilermakers
- National Association of Letter Carriers
- New York State United Teachers

Organizations

- Sierra Club

==== Predictions ====
Source	Ranking	As of
The Cook Political Report	Safe D	November 5, 2012
Rothenberg	Safe D	November 2, 2012
Roll Call	Safe D	November 4, 2012
Sabato's Crystal Ball	Safe D	November 5, 2012
NY Times	Safe D	November 4, 2012
RCP	Safe D	November 4, 2012
The Hill	Safe D	November 4, 2012

==== Results ====
New York's 14th congressional district, 2012
Party	Candidate	Votes	%
Democratic	Joe Crowley	116,117	80.0
Working Families	Joe Crowley	4,644	3.2
Total	Joe Crowley (incumbent)	120,761	83.2
Republican	William Gibbons	19,191	13.2
Conservative	William Gibbons	2,564	1.8
Total	William Gibbons	21,755	15.0
Green	Anthony Gronowicz	2,570	1.8
Total votes		145,086	100.0
Democratic hold			

== District 15 ==
2012 New York's 15th congressional district election
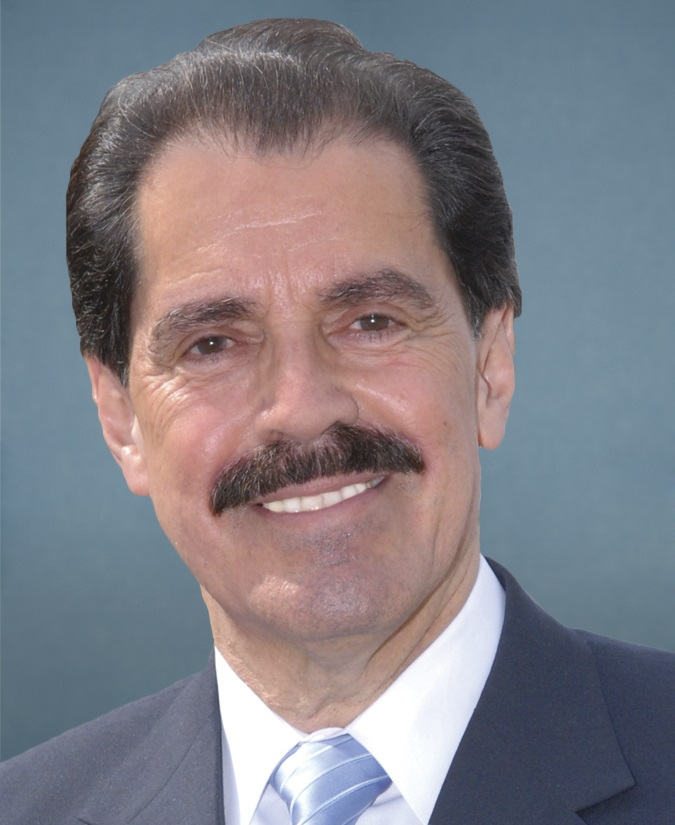
	Majority party
Candidate	José E. Serrano
Party	Democratic
Alliance	Working Families
Popular vote	152,661
Percentage	97.2%
- County results Serrano: 90–100%
U.S. Representative before election
José E. Serrano (16th)
Democratic
Elected U.S. Representative
José E. Serrano
Democratic

José E. Serrano, incumbent representative for the 16th district, ran for an 11th term.

=== Democratic primary ===
==== Candidates ====
===== Nominee =====
- José E. Serrano, incumbent U.S. representative

=== Republican primary ===
==== Candidates ====
===== Nominee =====
- Frank Della Valle

=== General election ===
==== Endorsements ====
José Serrano (D)

Labor unions

- AFL–CIO
- International Brotherhood of Boilermakers
- National Association of Letter Carriers
- New York State United Teachers

Organizations

- Sierra Club

==== Predictions ====
Source	Ranking	As of
The Cook Political Report	Safe D	November 5, 2012
Rothenberg	Safe D	November 2, 2012
Roll Call	Safe D	November 4, 2012
Sabato's Crystal Ball	Safe D	November 5, 2012
NY Times	Safe D	November 4, 2012
RCP	Safe D	November 4, 2012
The Hill	Safe D	November 4, 2012

==== Results ====
New York's 15th congressional district, 2012
Party	Candidate	Votes	%
Democratic	José Serrano	150,243	95.7
Working Families	José Serrano	2,418	1.5
Total	José Serrano (incumbent)	152,661	97.2
Republican	Frank Della Valle	3,487	2.2
Conservative	Frank Della Valle	940	0.6
Total	Frank Della Valle	4,427	2.8
Total votes		157,088	100.0
Democratic hold			

== District 16 ==
2012 New York's 16th congressional district election
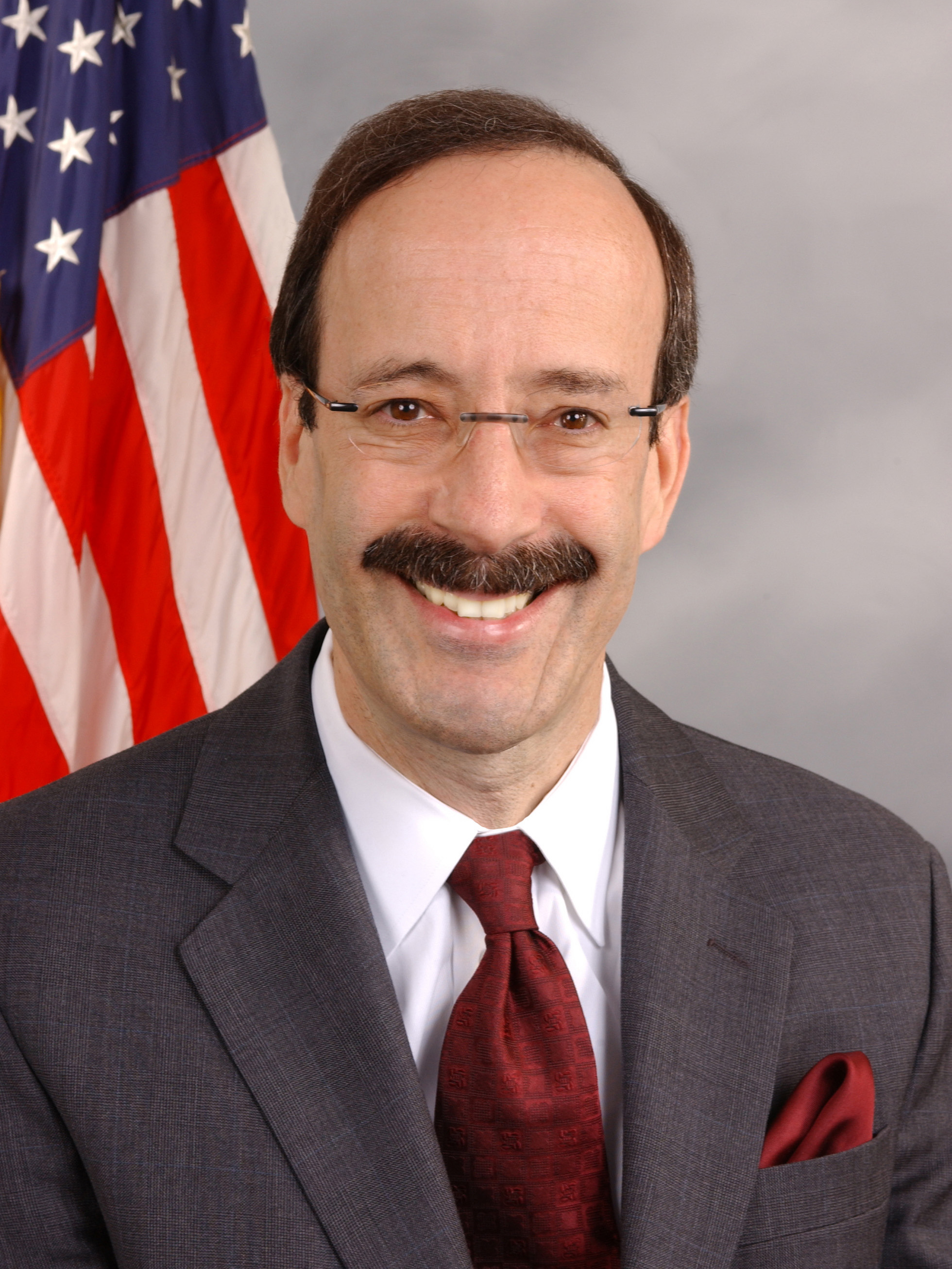

	Majority party	Minority party
Candidate	Eliot Engel	Joseph McLaughlin
Party	Democratic	Republican
Alliance	Working Families
Popular vote	179,562	53,935
Percentage	75.9%	22.8%
- County results Engel: 60–70% 90–100%
U.S. Representative before election
Eliot Engel (17th)
Democratic
Elected U.S. Representative
Eliot Engel
Democratic

Eliot Engel, incumbent representative for the 17th district, ran for a 12th term.

=== Democratic primary ===
==== Candidates ====
===== Nominee =====
- Eliot Engel, incumbent U.S. representative

===== Eliminated in primary =====
- Aniello Grimaldi

==== Primary results ====
Democratic primary results
Party	Candidate	Votes	%
Democratic	Eliot Engel (incumbent)	12,856	87.3
Democratic	Aniello Grimaldi	1,864	12.7
Total votes		14,720	100.0

=== Republican primary ===
==== Candidates ====
===== Nominee =====
- Joseph McLaughlin

===== Declined =====
- Mark Rosen, Army reservist and candidate for this seat in 2010

=== General election ===
==== Endorsements ====
Eliot Engel (D)

Labor unions

- AFL–CIO
- International Brotherhood of Boilermakers
- National Association of Letter Carriers
- New York State United Teachers

Organizations

- Sierra Club

==== Predictions ====
Source	Ranking	As of
The Cook Political Report	Safe D	November 5, 2012
Rothenberg	Safe D	November 2, 2012
Roll Call	Safe D	November 4, 2012
Sabato's Crystal Ball	Safe D	November 5, 2012
NY Times	Safe D	November 4, 2012
RCP	Safe D	November 4, 2012
The Hill	Safe D	November 4, 2012

==== Results ====
New York's 16th congressional district, 2012
Party	Candidate	Votes	%
Democratic	Eliot Engel	173,886	73.5
Working Families	Eliot Engel	5,676	2.4
Total	Eliot Engel (incumbent)	179,562	75.9
Republican	Joseph McLaughlin	53,935	22.8
Green	Joseph Diaferia	2,974	1.3
Total votes		236,471	100.0
Democratic hold			

== District 17 ==
2012 New York's 17th congressional district election
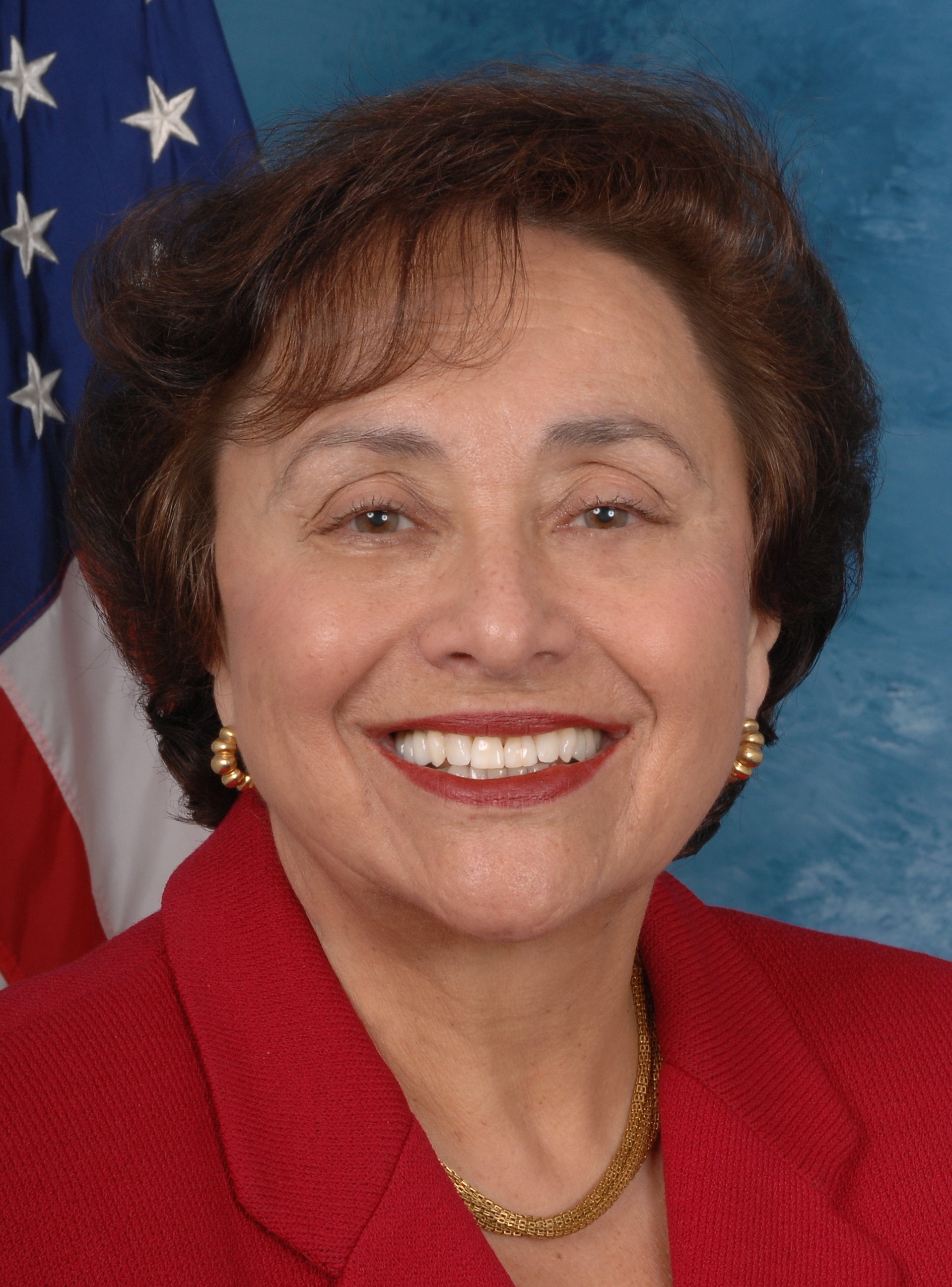

	Majority party	Minority party
Candidate	Nita Lowey	Joe Carvin
Party	Democratic	Republican
Alliance	Working Families
Popular vote	171,417	91,899
Percentage	64.4%	34.5%
- County results Lowey: 60–70%
U.S. Representative before election
Nita Lowey (18th)
Democratic
Elected U.S. Representative
Nita Lowey
Democratic

Incumbent Democrat Nita Lowey, who was redistricted from the 18th district, ran for re-election.

=== Democratic primary ===
==== Candidates ====
===== Nominee =====
- Nita Lowey, incumbent U.S. representative

===== Declined =====
- Chelsea Clinton, daughter of former President Bill Clinton and Secretary of State Hillary Rodham Clinton

=== Republican primary ===
Mark Rosen, who had run against Lowey in 2010, but was forced to drop out of the race after being deployed to Afghanistan, was expected to seek the Republican nomination. Rosen retired from the Army, eliminating the threat of redeployment during election cycle, but was redistricted out of the district and choose not to run against Lowey a second time.

==== Candidates ====
===== Nominee =====
- Joe Carvin, Rye town supervisor, and candidate for senate in 2012

===== Eliminated in primary =====
- Jim Russell, computer programmer, conservative Christian activist and nominee for this seat in 2010

===== Declined =====
- Mark Rosen, Army reservist and candidate for this seat in 2010

==== Primary results ====
Republican primary results
Party	Candidate	Votes	%
Republican	Joe Carvin	4,225	64.7
Republican	Jim Russell	2,307	35.3
Total votes		6,532	100.0

=== Independents ===
Frank Morganthaler, former NYFD lieutenant and private investigator, challenged Nita Lowey and ran on an independent line, We the People.

=== General election ===
==== Endorsements ====
Nita Lowey (D)

Labor unions

- AFL–CIO
- International Brotherhood of Boilermakers
- National Association of Letter Carriers
- New York State United Teachers

Organizations

- National Organization for Women
- Sierra Club
Joe Carvin (R)

Organizations

- National Republican Congressional Committee "On the Radar" Program

==== Predictions ====
Source	Ranking	As of
The Cook Political Report	Safe D	November 5, 2012
Rothenberg	Safe D	November 2, 2012
Roll Call	Safe D	November 4, 2012
Sabato's Crystal Ball	Safe D	November 5, 2012
NY Times	Safe D	November 4, 2012
RCP	Safe D	November 4, 2012
The Hill	Safe D	November 4, 2012

==== Results ====
New York's 17th congressional district, 2012
Party	Candidate	Votes	%
Democratic	Nita Lowey	161,624	60.7
Working Families	Nita Lowey	9,793	3.7
Total	Nita Lowey (incumbent)	171,417	64.4
Republican	Joe Carvin	91,899	34.5
We The People	Francis Morganthaler	2,771	1.0
Total votes		266,087	100.0
Democratic hold			

== District 18 ==
2012 New York's 18th congressional district election
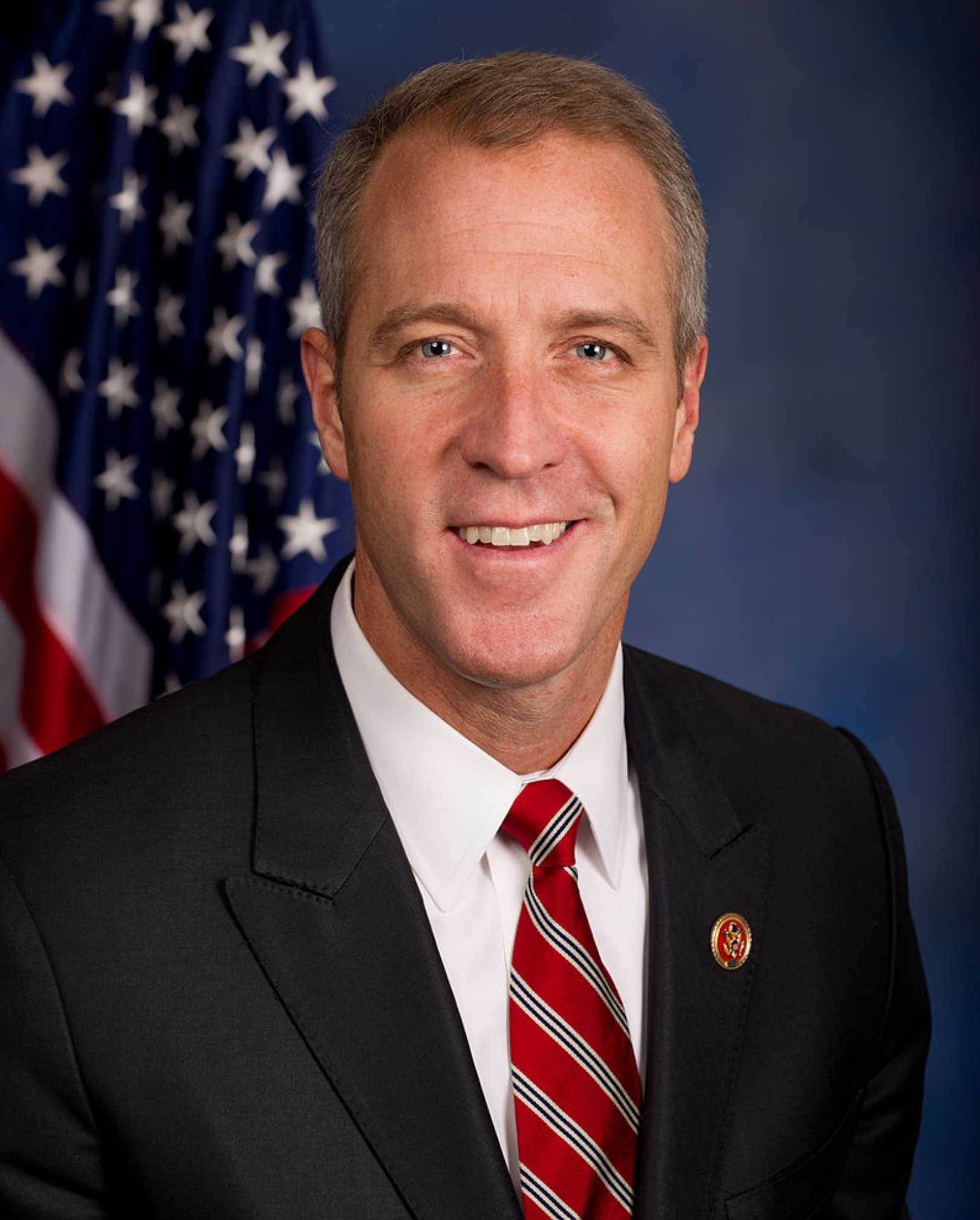

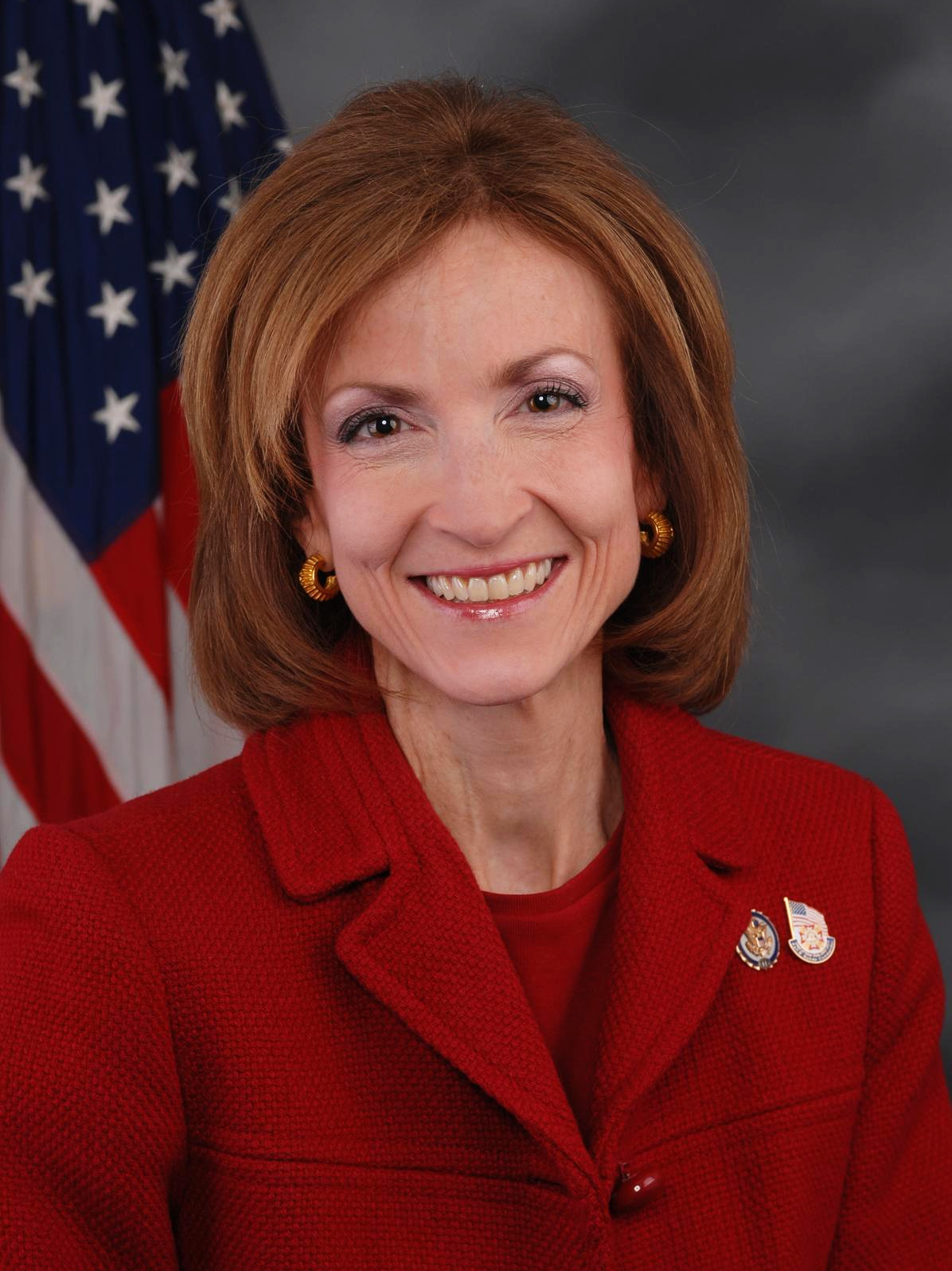
	Majority party	Minority party
Candidate	Sean Patrick Maloney	Nan Hayworth
Party	Democratic	Republican
Alliance	Working Families	Conservative
Popular vote	143,845	133,049
Percentage	51.9%	48.1%
U.S. Representative before election
Nan Hayworth (19th)
Republican
Elected U.S. Representative
Sean Patrick Maloney
Democratic

Republican Nan Hayworth, who was redistricted from the 19th district and had represented that district since January 2011, ran for re-election.

=== Republican primary ===
==== Candidates ====
===== Nominee =====
- Nan Hayworth, incumbent U.S. representative

===== Declined =====
- Greg Ball, state senator

=== Democratic primary ===
==== Candidates ====
===== Nominee =====
- Sean Patrick Maloney, lawyer and former staffer for Bill Clinton

===== Eliminated in primary =====
- Matthew Alexander, mayor of Wappingers Falls
- Richard Becker, cardiologist
- Duane Jackson, street vendor
- Tom Wilson, mayor of Tuxedo Park

===== Withdrawn =====
- Anne Jacobs Moultrie, registered nurse and vice president of Local 1199

===== Declined =====
- Sean Eldridge, LGBT activist
- John Hall, former U.S. representative
- Mike Kaplowitz, member of the Westchester County Board of Legislators
- Margo Miller, former chair of Democrats Abroad

==== Endorsements ====
Richard Becker

Labor unions

- Uniformed Fire Officers Association

Newspapers

- The New York Times
Sean Patrick Maloney

U.S. executive branch officials

- Bill Clinton, 42nd president of the United States

Labor unions

- AFL–CIO
- New York State United Teachers
- Service Employees International Union

==== Primary results ====
Maloney won the Democratic primary with 48% of the vote on June 26, 2012.

Democratic primary results
Party	Candidate	Votes	%
Democratic	Sean Patrick Maloney	7,493	48.3
Democratic	Richard H. Becker	5,036	32.4
Democratic	Matthew C. Alexander	1,857	12.0
Democratic	Duane Jackson	780	5.0
Democratic	Thomas Wilson	356	2.3
Total votes		15,522	100.0

=== General election ===
==== Endorsements ====
Nan Hayworth (R)

Organizations

- GOProud
- Maggie's List
- National Republican Congressional Committee "Patriot" Program
- NRA Political Victory Fund
- United States Chamber of Commerce
Sean Patrick Maloney (D)

U.S. Executive Branch officials

- Bill Clinton, 42nd president of the United States

Labor unions

- AFL–CIO
- International Brotherhood of Boilermakers
- National Association of Letter Carriers
- New York State United Teachers
- Service Employees International Union

Organizations

- Democracy for America
- Democratic Congressional Campaign Committee "Red to Blue" Program

Newspapers

- The New York Times

==== Polling ====
Poll source	Date(s) administered	Sample size	Margin of error	Nan Hayworth (R)	Sean Maloney (D)	Undecided
Siena College	October 16–17, 2012	615	± 4%	49%	42%	9%
Global Strategy (D-Maloney)	October 4–7, 2012	403	± 4.9%	44%	42%	14%
Public Policy Polling (D-NY AFl-CIO)	September 19–20, 2012	602	± 4.0%	43%	43%	13%
Siena College	September 12–16, 2012	628	± 3.9%	46%	33%	21%
Tarrance (R-Hayworth)	August 26–28, 2012	408	± 4.9%	51%	42%	7%
Greenberg Quinlan Rosner Research (D-House Majority PAC)/SEIU)	July 25–29, 2012	500	± 4.4%	48%	45%	7%

==== Predictions ====
Source	Ranking	As of
The Cook Political Report	Tossup	November 5, 2012
Rothenberg	Tilt R	November 2, 2012
Roll Call	Tossup	November 4, 2012
Sabato's Crystal Ball	Lean R	November 5, 2012
NY Times	Lean R	November 4, 2012
RCP	Lean R	November 4, 2012
The Hill	Tossup	November 4, 2012

==== Results ====
On election day, Maloney won by a narrow margin, becoming New York's first openly LGBQ+ member of Congress.

New York's 18th congressional district, 2012
Party	Candidate	Votes	%
Democratic	Sean Patrick Maloney	132,456	47.8
Working Families	Sean Patrick Maloney	11,389	4.1
Total	Sean Patrick Maloney	143,845	51.9
Republican	Nan Hayworth	113,386	41.0
Conservative	Nan Hayworth	19,663	7.1
Total	Nan Hayworth (incumbent)	133,049	48.1
Total votes		276,894	100.0
Democratic gain from Republican			

== District 19 ==
2012 New York's 19th congressional district election
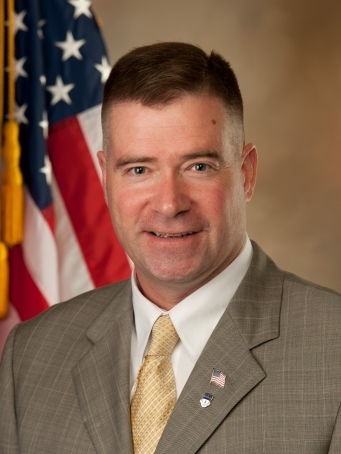

Nominee	Chris Gibson	Julian Schreibman
Party	Republican	Democratic
Alliance	Conservative; Independence	Working Families
Popular vote	150,245	134,295
Percentage	52.8%	47.2%
- County results Gibson: 50–60% 60–70% Schreibman: 50–60%
U.S. Representative before election
Chris Gibson (20th)
Republican
Elected U.S. Representative
Chris Gibson
Republican

Incumbent Republican Chris Gibson, who was redistricted from the 20th district and had represented that district since 2011, ran for re-election. He was elected with 53.19% of the vote in 2010. The district had a PVI of Even.

With redistricting settled, the new 19th district went from being a Republican-leaning district to being a swing district. Because of the dissolution of Maurice Hinchey's district, much of that district, including all of Ulster and Sullivan counties, was dissolved into this new district.

=== Republican primary ===
==== Candidates ====
===== Nominee =====
- Chris Gibson, incumbent U.S. representative

=== Democratic primary ===
==== Candidates ====
===== Nominee =====
- Julian Schreibman, former federal prosecutor and Ulster County Democratic Party chair

===== Eliminated in primary =====
- Joel Tyner, member of the Dutchess County legislature

===== Declined =====
- Mike Hein, Ulster County executive
- Maurice Hinchey, incumbent U.S. representative

==== Endorsements ====
Julian Schreibman

U.S. representatives

- Maurice Hinchey, U.S. representative from New York's 22nd congressional district (1993–present)

==== Primary results ====
Schreibman prevailed in the Democratic primary.

Democratic primary results
Party	Candidate	Votes	%
Democratic	Julian Schreibman	6,653	58.8
Democratic	Joel Tyner	4,657	41.2
Total votes		11,310	100.0

=== General election ===
==== Endorsements ====
Chris Gibson (R)

Labor unions

- New York State United Teachers

Organizations

- National Republican Congressional Committee "Patriot" Program
- National Right to Life Committee
- NRA Political Victory Fund
- United States Chamber of Commerce
Julian Schreibman (D)

U.S. representatives

- Maurice Hinchey, U.S. representative from New York's 22nd congressional district (1993–present)

Labor unions

- AFL–CIO
- International Brotherhood of Boilermakers

Organizations

- Democratic Congressional Campaign Committee "Red to Blue" Program
- Sierra Club

==== Debate ====
2012 New York's 19th congressional district debate
No.	Date	Host	Moderator	Link	Republican	Democratic
Key: P Participant A Absent N Not invited I Invited W Withdrawn						
Key: P Participant A Absent N Not invited I Invited W Withdrawn					Chris Gibson	Julian Schriebman
1	Oct. 18, 2012	Times Union; WMHT-TV	Matt Ryan		P	P

==== Polling ====
Poll source	Date(s) administered	Sample size	Margin of error	Chris Gibson (R)	Julian Schreibman (D)	Undecided
Siena College	October 27–28, 2012	649	± 3.8%	48%	43%	9%
Public Opinion Strategies (R-Gibson)	October 24–25, 2012	400	± 4.9%	49%	39%	%
Public Opinion Strategies (R-Gibson)	October 9–10, 2012	400	± 4.9%	50%	39%	11%
Grove Insight (D-DCCC)	October 5–7, 2012	400	± 4.9%	43%	41%	16%
OnMessage (R-NRCC)	September 30–October 1, 2012	400	± 4.9%	47%	39%	16%
Siena College	September 17–18, 2012	635	± 3.9%	52%	36%	12%
Public Opinion Strategies (R-Gibson)	July 25–26, 2012	400	± 4.9%	53%	36%	10%
Global Strategy (D-Schreibman)	July 18–22, 2012	402	± 4.9%	42%	32%	24%

==== Predictions ====
Source	Ranking	As of
The Cook Political Report	Tossup	November 5, 2012
Rothenberg	Tilts R	November 2, 2012
Roll Call	Tossup	November 4, 2012
Sabato's Crystal Ball	Lean R	November 5, 2012
NY Times	Lean R	November 4, 2012
RCP	Lean R	November 4, 2012
The Hill	Tossup	November 4, 2012

==== Results ====
New York's 19th congressional district, 2012
Party	Candidate	Votes	%
Republican	Chris Gibson	123,066	43.3
Conservative	Chris Gibson	17,629	6.2
Independence	Chris Gibson	9,550	3.3
Total	Chris Gibson (incumbent)	150,245	52.8
Democratic	Julian Schreibman	120,959	42.5
Working Families	Julian Schreibman	13,336	4.7
Total	Julian Schreibman	134,295	47.2
Total votes		284,540	100.0
Republican hold			

== District 20 ==
2012 New York's 20th congressional district election
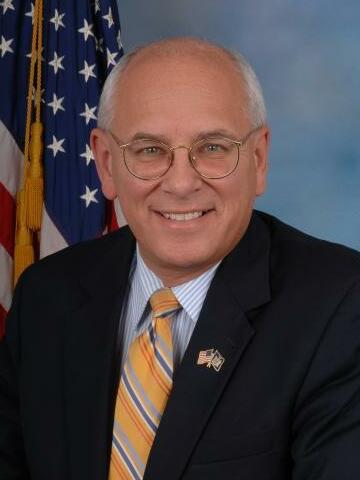

	Majority party	Minority party
Candidate	Paul Tonko	Robert Dieterich
Party	Democratic	Republican
Alliance	Independence; Working Families	Conservative
Popular vote	203,401	93,778
Percentage	68.4%	31.6%
- County results Tonko: 50–60% 60–70% 70–80%
U.S. Representative before election
Paul Tonko (21st)
Democratic
Elected U.S. Representative
Paul Tonko
Democratic

Incumbent Democrat Paul Tonko ran for re-election in his heavily Democratic, mostly unchanged, district that was formerly numbered as the 21st.

=== Democratic primary ===
==== Candidates ====
===== Nominee =====
- Paul Tonko, incumbent U.S. representative

=== Republican primary ===
==== Candidates ====
===== Nominee =====
- Bob Dieterich

=== General election ===
==== Endorsements ====
Paul Tonko (D)

Labor unions

- AFL–CIO
- International Brotherhood of Boilermakers
- National Association of Letter Carriers
- New York State United Teachers

Organizations

- Sierra Club

==== Predictions ====
Source	Ranking	As of
The Cook Political Report	Safe D	November 5, 2012
Rothenberg	Safe D	November 2, 2012
Roll Call	Safe D	November 4, 2012
Sabato's Crystal Ball	Safe D	November 5, 2012
NY Times	Safe D	November 4, 2012
RCP	Safe D	November 4, 2012
The Hill	Safe D	November 4, 2012

==== Results ====
New York's 20th congressional district, 2012
Party	Candidate	Votes	%
Democratic	Paul Tonko	181,093	60.9
Working Families	Paul Tonko	12,017	4.0
Independence	Paul Tonko	10,291	3.5
Total	Paul Tonko (incumbent)	203,401	68.4
Republican	Robert Dieterich	79,102	26.6
Conservative	Robert Dieterich	14,676	5.0
Total	Robert Dieterich	93,778	31.6
Total votes		297,179	100.0
Democratic hold			

== District 21 ==
2012 New York's 21st congressional district election
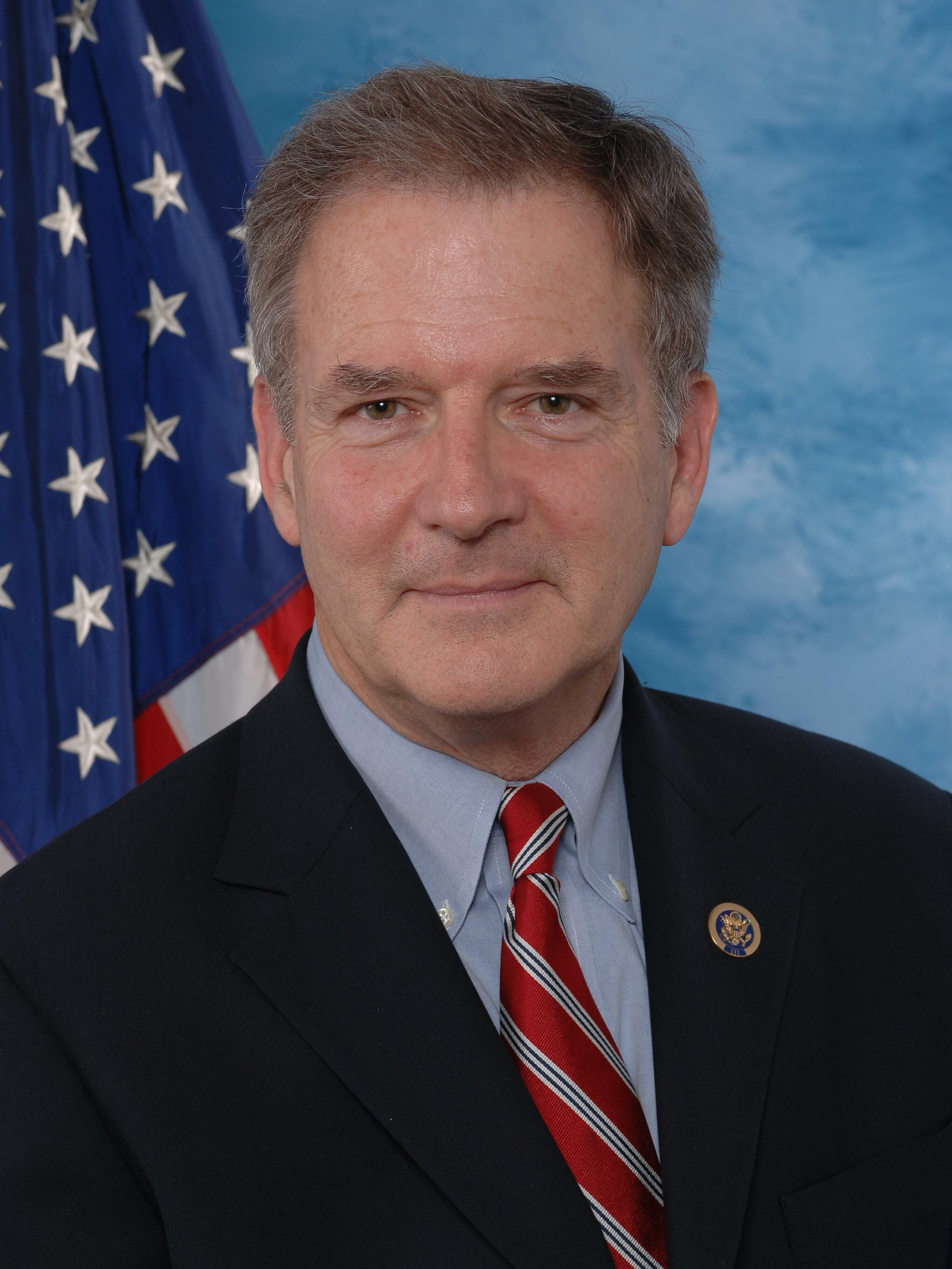

	Majority party	Minority party
Candidate	Bill Owens	Matt Doheny
Party	Democratic	Republican
Alliance	Working Families	Conservative; Independence
Popular vote	126,631	121,646
Percentage	50.1%	48.2%
- County results Owens: 50–60% 60–70% Doheny: 50–60% 60–70%
U.S. Representative before election
Bill Owens (23rd)
Democratic
Elected U.S. Representative
Bill Owens
Democratic

Incumbent Democrat Bill Owens, who had represented the district since 2009, ran for re-election. He was re-elected with 47.5% of the vote in 2010. The district had a PVI of R+2 in the renumbered 21st district. He faced a rematch against Matt Doheny, and was re-elected to a third term by 4,985 votes.

=== Democratic primary ===
==== Candidates ====
===== Nominee =====
- Bill Owens, incumbent U.S. representative

=== Republican primary ===
Matt Doheny, a businessman who had come within 2,000 votes of beating Owens in 2010, faced Kellie Greene, an Oswego County native and theologian who most recently lived in Arizona, in the primary.

==== Candidates ====
===== Nominee =====
- Matt Doheny, businessman and nominee for this seat in 2010

===== Eliminated in primary =====
- Kellie Greene, Oswego County native and theologian

===== Withdrawn =====
- Tim Stampfler, corrections officer

===== Declined =====
- Kelly Eustis, executive director of One Nation PAC
- Jeff Stabins, eccentric politician (who until recently lived in Hernando County, Florida, before relocating to Sacketts Harbor, New York)

==== Primary results ====
Doheny defeated Greene in the Republican primary. Hassig dropped out of the race on November 3, endorsing Owens, but remained on the ballot.

Republican primary results
Party	Candidate	Votes	%
Republican	Matthew A. Doheny	9,331	70.8
Republican	Kellie A. Greene	3,847	29.2
Total votes		13,178	100.0

Doheny secured the Independence Party line and the Conservative Party lines, the latter of which he did not have in 2010.

=== Green primary ===
==== Candidates ====
===== Nominee =====
- Donald Hassig, anti-cancer activist

Hassig appeared on the Green line despite the party's disavowal of him over his stance on immigration.

=== General election ===
==== Endorsements ====
Bill Owens (D)

Labor unions

- AFL–CIO
- International Brotherhood of Boilermakers
- National Association of Letter Carriers
- New York State United Teachers

Organizations

- Democratic Congressional Campaign Committee "Frontline" Program
- NRA Political Victory Fund
- Sierra Club
Matthew Doheny (R)

Organizations

- National Republican Congressional Committee "Young Guns" Program
- United States Chamber of Commerce

==== Polling ====
Poll source	Date(s) administered	Sample size	Margin of error	Bill Owens (D)	Matthew Doheny (R)	Donald Hassig (G)	Undecided
Siena College	October 29–30, 2012	629	± 3.9%	44%	43%	4%	9%
Public Opinion Strategies (R-Doheny)	October 24–25, 2012	400	± 5.0%	42%	40%	—	18%
Global Strategy (D-Owens)	October 21–23, 2012	403	± 4.3%	47%	40%	—	13%
Public Opinion Strategies (R-Doheny)/NRCC)	October 1–2, 2012	400	± 5.0%	45%	40%	—	15%
Global Strategy (D-Owens)	September 30–October 2, 2012	400	± 4.9%	50%	36%	—	14%
Siena College	September 4–6, 2012	638	± 3.9%	49%	36%	6%	8%
Anzalone Liszt (D-DCCC)	July 29–31, 2012	400	± 4.9%	50%	38%	4%	8%

==== Predictions ====
Source	Ranking	As of
The Cook Political Report	Lean D	November 5, 2012
Rothenberg	Tilt D	November 2, 2012
Roll Call	Tossup	November 4, 2012
Sabato's Crystal Ball	Lean D	November 5, 2012
NY Times	Lean D	November 4, 2012
RCP	Tossup	November 4, 2012
The Hill	Lean D	November 4, 2012

==== Results ====
New York's 21st congressional district, 2012
Party	Candidate	Votes	%
Democratic	Bill Owens	117,856	46.7
Working Families	Bill Owens	8,775	3.5
Total	Bill Owens (incumbent)	126,631	50.2
Republican	Matt Doheny	104,368	41.3
Conservative	Matt Doheny	12,877	5.1
Independence	Matt Doheny	4,401	1.8
Total	Matt Doheny	121,646	48.2
Green	Donald Hassig	4,174	1.6
Total votes		252,556	100.0
Democratic hold			

== District 22 ==
2012 New York's 22nd congressional district election
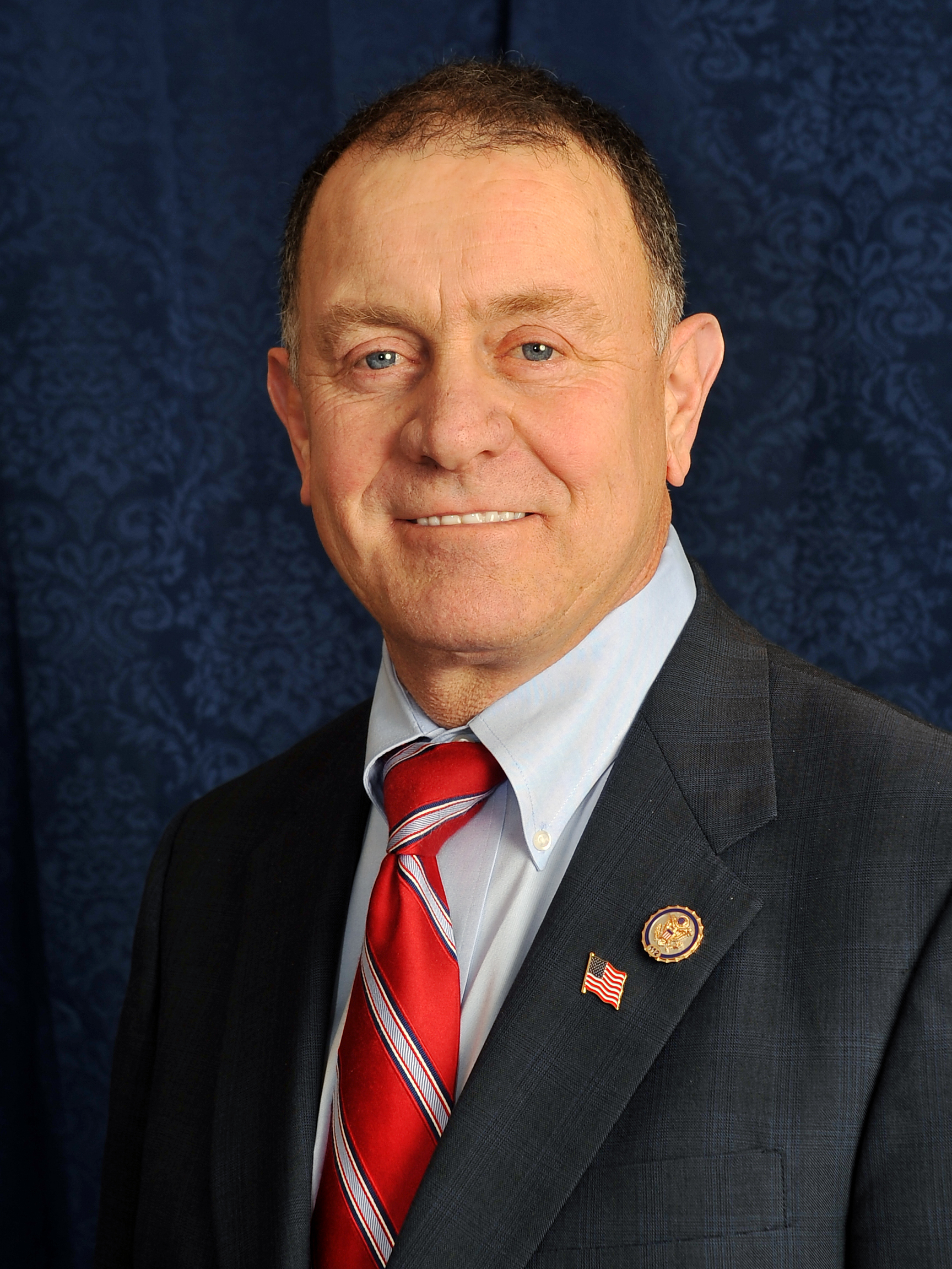

	Majority party	Minority party
Candidate	Richard Hanna	Dan Lamb
Party	Republican	Democratic
Alliance	Independence
Popular vote	157,941	102,080
Percentage	60.8%	39.2%
U.S. Representative before election
Richard Hanna (24th)
Republican
Elected U.S. Representative
Richard Hanna
Republican

Republican Richard Hanna, who was redistricted from the 24th district having represented that district since 2011, ran for re-election.

=== Republican primary ===
Hanna defeated Michael Kicinski, who was backed by Carl Paladino, Doug Hoffman and other Tea Party activists, in the Republican primary.

==== Candidates ====
===== Nominee =====
- Richard Hanna, incumbent U.S. representative

===== Eliminated in primary =====
- Michael Kicinski, Tea Party activist and electronics engineer

===== Withdrawn =====
- Tom Engel
- George Phillips

==== Primary results ====
Republican primary results
Party	Candidate	Votes	%
Republican	Richard L. Hanna (incumbent)	10,627	71.1
Republican	Michael Kicinski	4,314	28.9
Total votes		14,941	100.0

=== Democratic primary ===
==== Candidates ====
===== Nominee =====
- Dan Lamb, district representative for outgoing representative Maurice Hinchey

===== Declined =====
- Maurice Hinchey, incumbent U.S. representative

=== General election ===
==== Endorsements ====
Richard Hanna (R)

Labor unions

- National Association of Letter Carriers

Organizations

- GOProud
- NRA Political Victory Fund
- United States Chamber of Commerce
Dan Lamb (D)

Labor unions

- AFL–CIO
- International Brotherhood of Boilermakers

Organizations

- Democratic Congressional Campaign Committee "Emerging Races" Program
- Sierra Club

==== Predictions ====
Source	Ranking	As of
The Cook Political Report	Safe R	November 5, 2012
Rothenberg	Safe R	November 2, 2012
Roll Call	Safe R	November 4, 2012
Sabato's Crystal Ball	Safe R	November 5, 2012
NY Times	Lean R	November 4, 2012
RCP	Safe R	November 4, 2012
The Hill	Likely R	November 4, 2012

==== Results ====
New York's 22nd congressional district, 2012
Party	Candidate	Votes	%
Republican	Richard Hanna	145,042	55.8
Independence	Richard Hanna	12,899	5.0
Total	Richard Hanna (incumbent)	157,941	60.8
Democratic	Dan Lamb	102,080	39.2
Total votes		260,021	100.0
Republican hold			

== District 23 ==
2012 New York's 23rd congressional district election
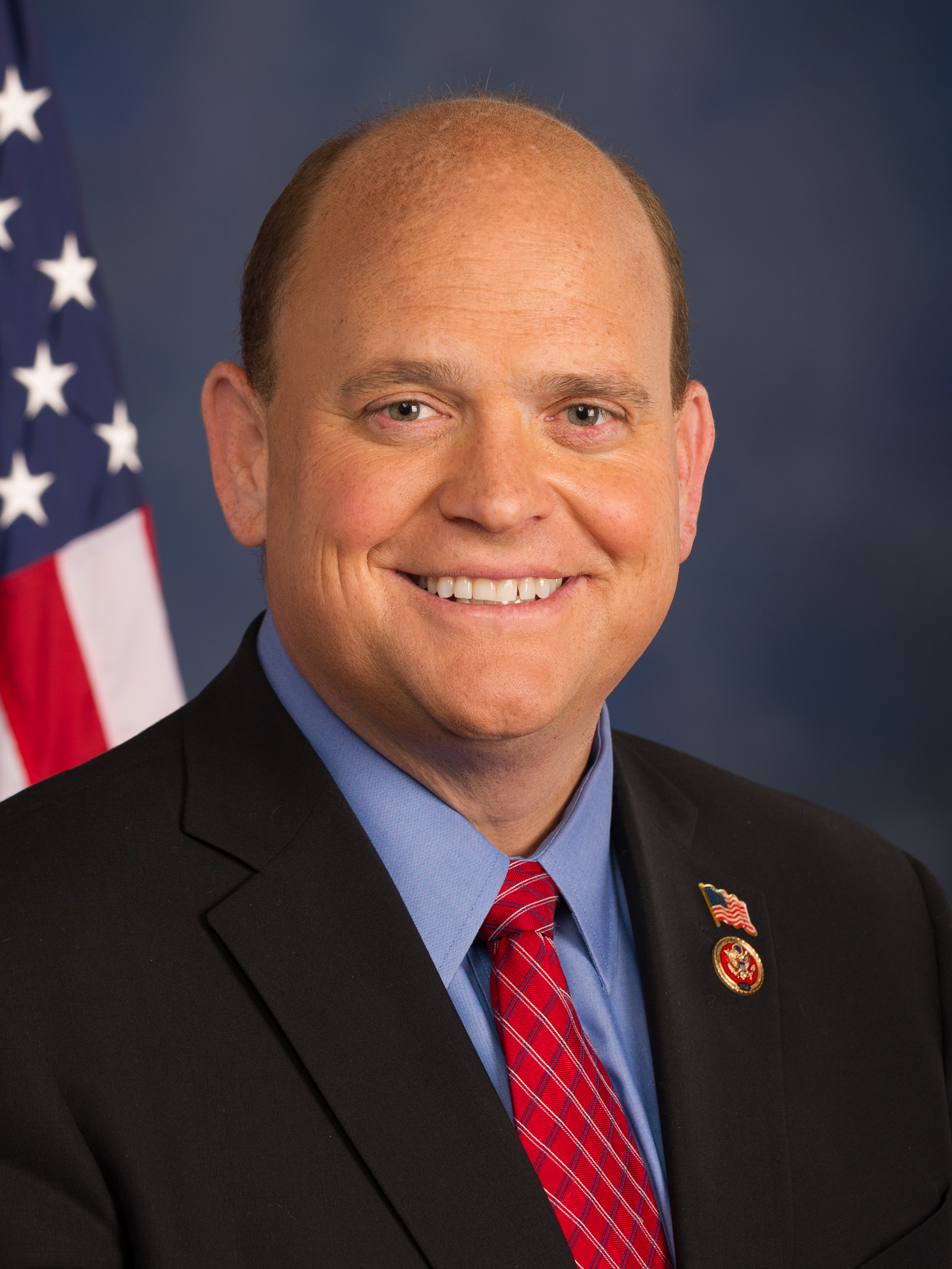

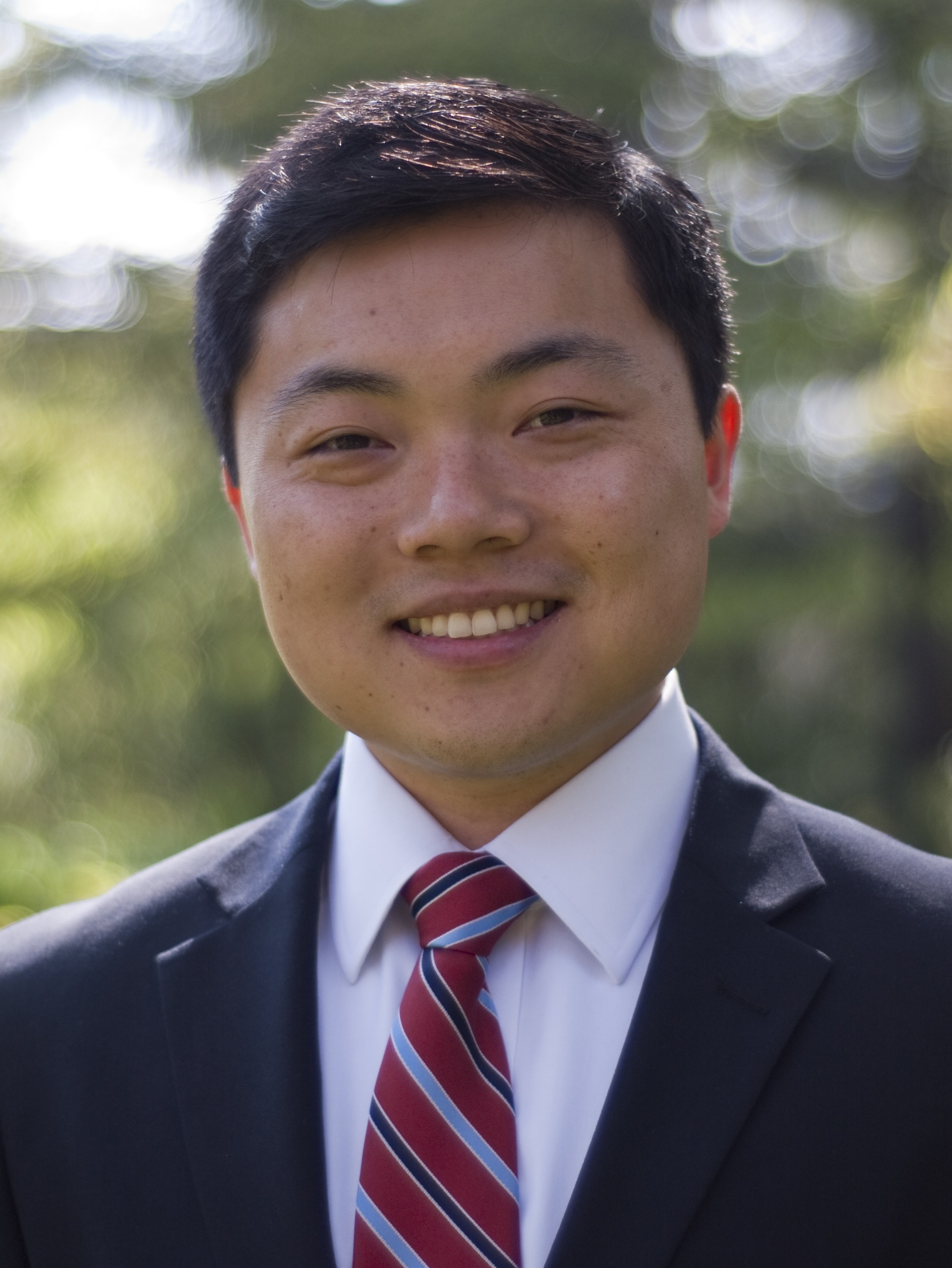
	Majority party	Minority party
Candidate	Tom Reed	Nate Shinagawa
Party	Republican	Democratic
Alliance	Conservative; Independence	Working Families
Popular vote	137,669	127,535
Percentage	51.9%	48.1%
- County results Reed: 50–60% 60–70% Shinagawa: 70–80%
U.S. Representative before election
Tom Reed (29th)
Republican
Elected U.S. Representative
Tom Reed
Republican

Incumbent Republican Tom Reed, who was redistricted from the 29th district having represented that district since 2010, ran for re-election. He was elected with 56.3% of the vote in 2010. The district had a PVI of R+3.

=== Republican primary ===
Reed was initially noncommittal regarding re-election, stating in July 2011 that "Re-election is the farthest thing from my mind;" he officially announced for re-election on April 30, 2012.

==== Candidates ====
===== Nominee =====
- Tom Reed, incumbent U.S. representative

=== Democratic primary ===
==== Candidates ====
===== Nominee =====
- Nate Shinagawa, Tompkins County legislator

===== Eliminated in primary =====
- Leslie Danks Burke, attorney
- Melissa K. Dobson, corporate lawyer

===== Declined =====
- Matthew Zeller, former CIA analyst, Afghanistan war veteran and nominee for this seat in 2010 (endorsed Shinagawa)

==== Endorsements ====
Nate Shinagawa

Individuals

- Matthew Zeller, former CIA analyst, Afghanistan war veteran and nominee for this seat in 2010

==== Primary results ====
Nate Shinagawa won the Democratic primary election over Leslie Danks Burke (also an Ithaca resident) and Melissa Dobson on June 26, 2012.

Democratic primary results
Party	Candidate	Votes	%
Democratic	Nate Shinagawa	6,162	53.9
Democratic	Leslie Danks Burke	4,246	37.1
Democratic	Melissa K. Dobson	1,033	9.0
Total votes		11,441	100.0

=== General election ===
==== Endorsements ====
Tom Reed (R)

Labor unions

- National Association of Letter Carriers

Organizations

- Campaign for Working Families
- National Right to Life Committee
- NRA Political Victory Fund
- United States Chamber of Commerce
Nate Shinagawa (D)

Labor unions

- AFL–CIO
- International Brotherhood of Boilermakers
- New York State United Teachers

Organizations

- Democratic Congressional Campaign Committee "Emerging Races" Program
- Sierra Club

==== Predictions ====
Source	Ranking	As of
The Cook Political Report	Safe R	November 5, 2012
Rothenberg	Safe R	November 2, 2012
Roll Call	Safe R	November 4, 2012
Sabato's Crystal Ball	Safe R	November 5, 2012
NY Times	Lean R	November 4, 2012
RCP	Safe R	November 4, 2012
The Hill	Safe R	November 4, 2012

==== Results ====
New York's 23rd congressional district, 2012
Party	Candidate	Votes	%
Republican	Tom Reed	117,641	44.3
Conservative	Tom Reed	14,273	5.4
Independence	Tom Reed	5,755	2.2
Total	Tom Reed (incumbent)	137,669	51.9
Democratic	Nate Shinagawa	114,590	43.2
Working Families	Nate Shinagawa	12,945	4.9
Total	Nate Shinagawa	127,535	48.1
Total votes		265,204	100.0
Republican hold			

== District 24 ==
2012 New York's 24th congressional district election
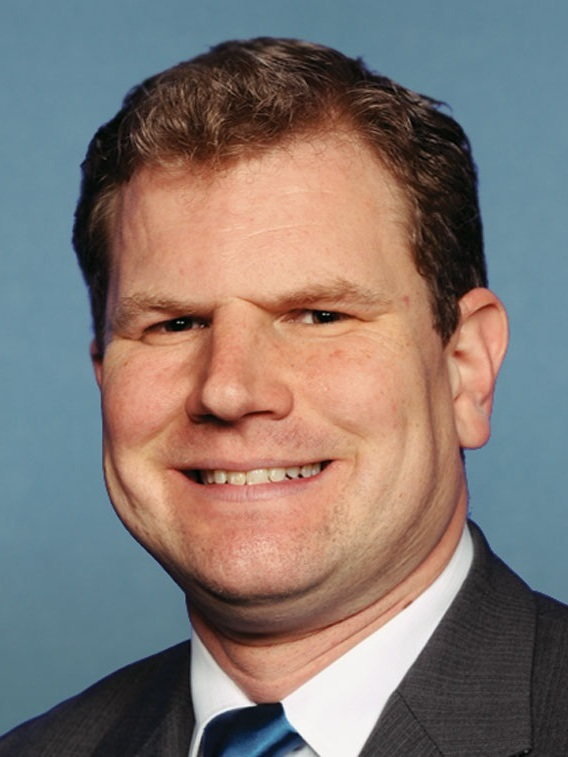

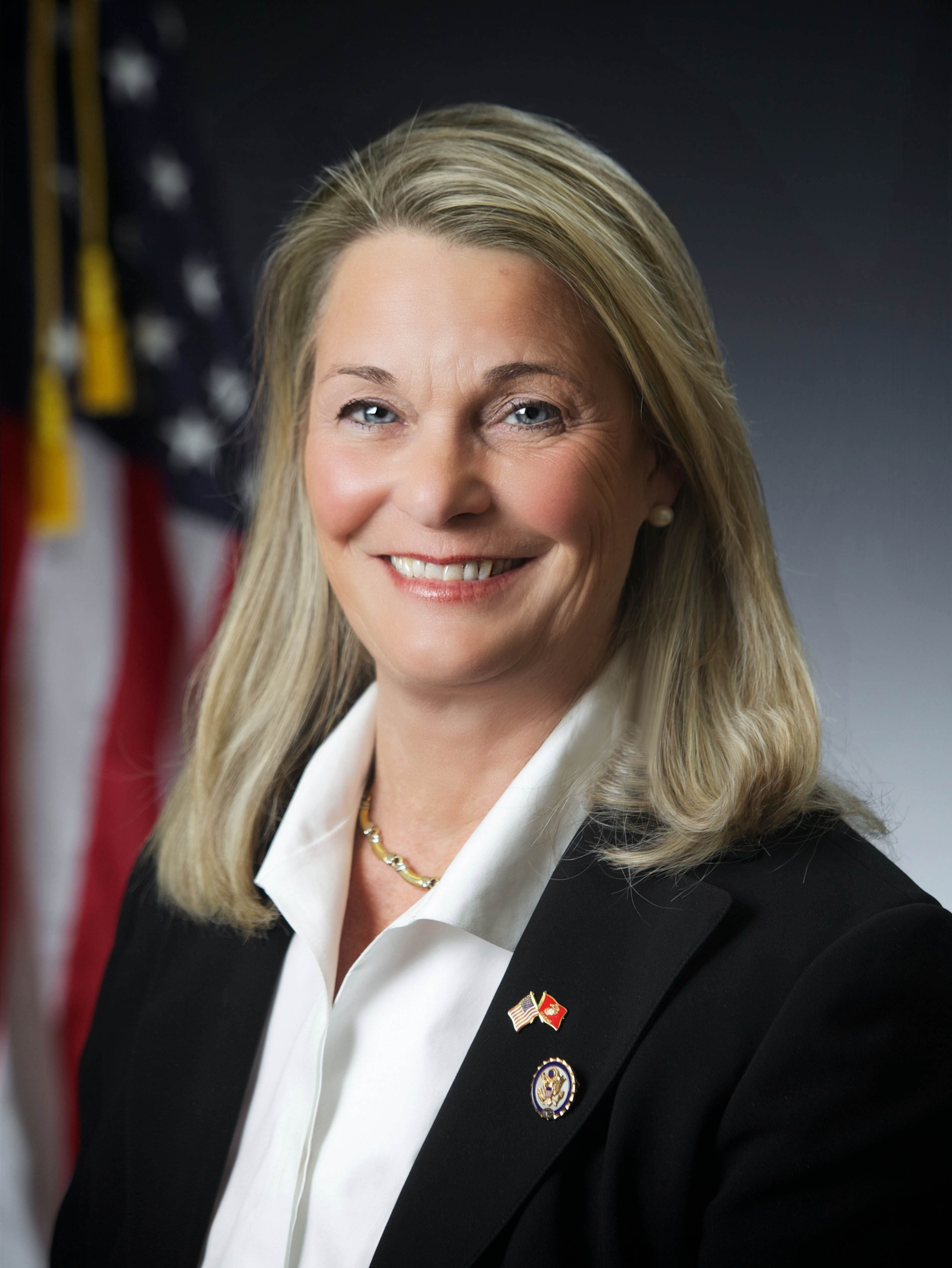

	Majority party	Minority party	Third party
Candidate	Dan Maffei	Ann Marie Buerkle	Ursula Rozum
Party	Democratic	Republican	Green
Alliance	Working Families	Conservative; Independence
Popular vote	143,044	127,054	22,670
Percentage	48.8%	43.4%	7.8%
- County results Maffei: 40–50% 50–60% Buerkle: 40–50% 60–70%
U.S. Representative before election
Ann Marie Buerkle (25th)
Republican
Elected U.S. Representative
Dan Maffei
Democratic

The new 24th district included all of Cayuga, Onondaga and Wayne counties, and the western part of Oswego County. Incumbent Republican Ann Marie Buerkle, who had represented the 25th district since 2011, sought re-election in the redrawn 24th district. The district had a PVI of D+3.

=== Republican primary ===
On February 6, Robert Paul Spencer announced he would run in the Republican primary against Buerkle, citing his opposition to Buerkle's vote in favor of the National Defense Authorization Act, which Spencer believed to be unconstitutional. However, he did not appear on the primary ballot.

==== Candidates ====
===== Nominee =====
- Ann Marie Buerkle, incumbent U.S. representative

===== Withdrawn =====
- Robert Spencer

=== Democratic primary ===
==== Candidates ====
===== Nominee =====
- Dan Maffei, former U.S. representative

===== Withdrawn =====
- Brianne Murphy, attorney

===== Declined =====
- Tom Buckel, member of the Onondaga County legislature

=== Green primary ===
==== Candidates ====
===== Nominee =====
- Ursula Rozum, public-transportation advocate

=== General election ===
==== Endorsements ====
Ann Marie Buerkle (R)

Organizations

- Campaign for Working Families
- Eagle Forum
- Maggie's List
- National Republican Congressional Committee "Patriot" Program
- National Right to Life Committee
- NRA Political Victory Fund
- Susan B. Anthony List
- United States Chamber of Commerce
Dan Maffei (D)

Labor unions

- AFL–CIO
- International Brotherhood of Boilermakers
- National Association of Letter Carriers
- New York State United Teachers

Organizations

- Democratic Congressional Campaign Committee "Red to Blue" Program
- National Organization for Women
- Sierra Club

Newspapers

- The New York Times

==== Debates ====
2012 New York's 24th congressional district debates
No.	Date	Host	Moderator	Link	Republican	Democratic	Green
Key: P Participant A Absent N Not invited I Invited W Withdrawn							
Key: P Participant A Absent N Not invited I Invited W Withdrawn					Ann Marie Buerkle	Dan Maffei	Ursula Rozum
1	Oct. 24, 2012	CNY Central; WCNY-TV	Susan Arbetter; Matt Mulcahy		P	P	P
2	Nov. 2, 2012	WSYR-TV	Dan Cummings		P	P	P

==== Polling ====
Poll source	Date(s) administered	Sample size	Margin of error	Ann Marie Buerkle (R)	Dan Maffei (D)	Ursula Rozum (G)	Undecided
Siena College	October 31–November 2, 2012	670	± 3.8%	44%	44%	8%	4%
Lake Research Partners (D-Friends of Democracy)	October 15–17, 2012	425	± 4.6%	44%	46%	6%	4%
Grove Insight (D-DCCC)	September 23–24, 2012	400	± 4.9%	38%	46%	7%	9%
Siena College	September 5–10, 2012	625	± 3.9%	43%	43%	7%	7%
Grove Insight (D-DCCC)	August 26–28, 2012	400	± 4.9%	42%	48%	4%	6%
Normington, Petts & Associates (D-House Majority PAC)/SEIU)	July 16–18, 2012	400	± 4.9%	40%	44%	5%	11%
Public Policy Polling (D-League of Conservation Voters)	July 10–11, 2012	642	± 3.9%	42%	45%	—	13%
McLaughlin (R-Buerkle)	April 16–17, 2012	400	± 4.9%	42%	38%	—	20%

==== Predictions ====
Source	Ranking	As of
The Cook Political Report	Lean D (flip)	November 5, 2012
Rothenberg	Tilt D (flip)	November 2, 2012
Roll Call	Tossup	November 4, 2012
Sabato's Crystal Ball	Lean D (flip)	November 5, 2012
NY Times	Tossup	November 4, 2012
RCP	Lean D (flip)	November 4, 2012
The Hill	Tossup	November 4, 2012

==== Results ====
New York's 24th congressional district, 2012
Party	Candidate	Votes	%
Democratic	Dan Maffei	133,908	45.7
Working Families	Dan Maffei	9,136	3.1
Total	Dan Maffei	143,044	48.8
Republican	Ann Marie Buerkle	105,584	36.1
Conservative	Ann Marie Buerkle	16,481	5.6
Independence	Ann Marie Buerkle	4,989	1.7
Total	Ann Marie Buerkle (incumbent)	127,054	43.4
Green	Ursula Rozum	22,670	7.8
Total votes		292,768	100.0
Democratic gain from Republican			

== District 25 ==
2012 New York's 25th congressional district election
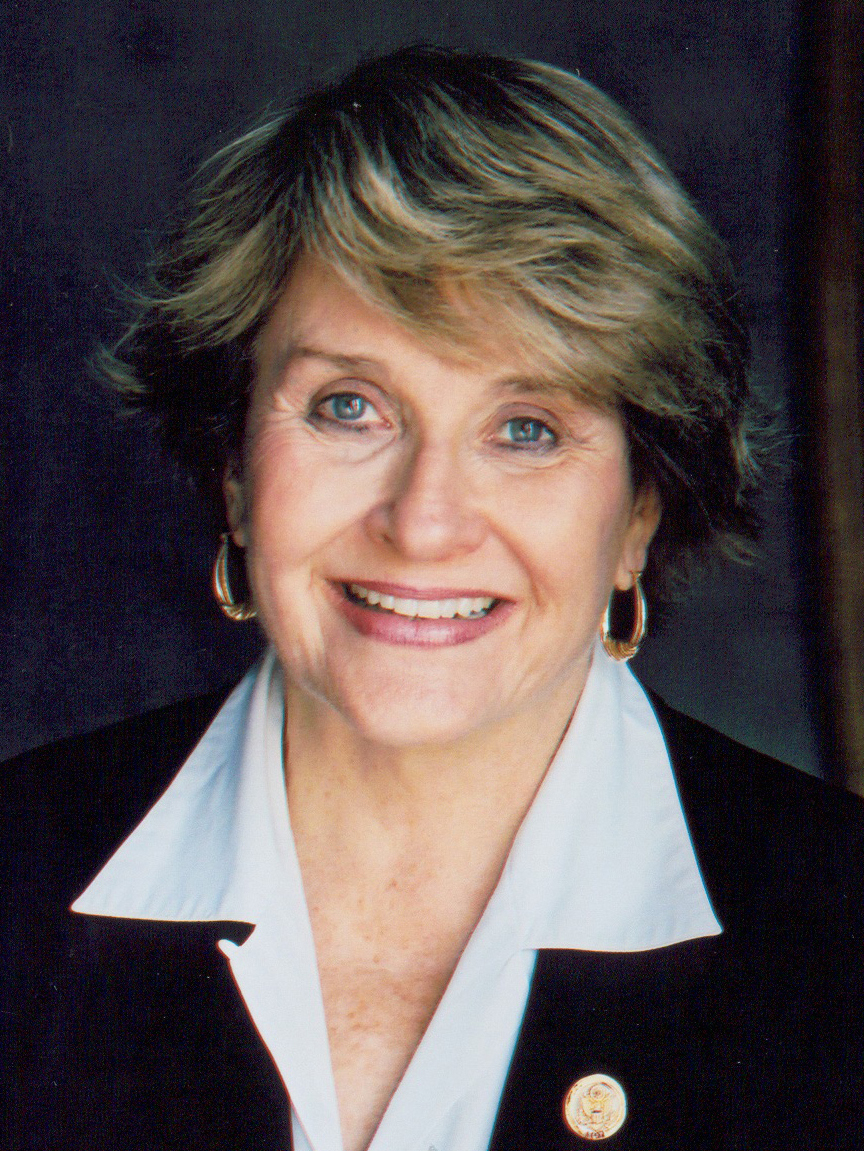

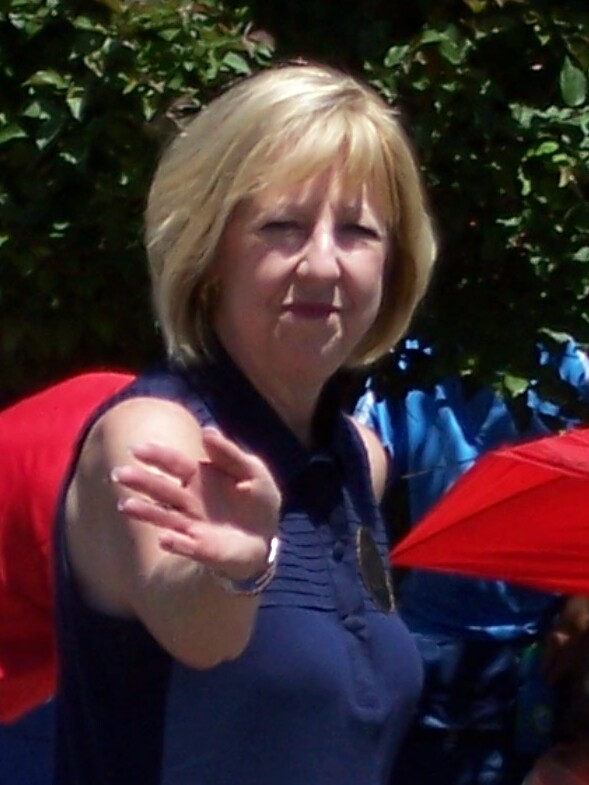
	Majority party	Minority party
Candidate	Louise Slaughter	Maggie Brooks
Party	Democratic	Republican
Alliance	Working Families	Conservative; Independence
Popular vote	179,810	133,389
Percentage	57.4%	42.6%
- County results Slaughter: 50–60%
U.S. Representative before election
Louise Slaughter (28th)
Democratic
Elected U.S. Representative
Louise Slaughter
Democratic

Incumbent Democrat Louise Slaughter, who was redistricted from the 28th district and had represented the Rochester metropolitan area since 1987, ran for re-election.

=== Democratic primary ===
==== Candidates ====
===== Nominee =====
- Louise Slaughter, incumbent U.S. representative

=== Republican primary ===
==== Candidates ====
===== Nominee =====
- Maggie Brooks, Monroe County executive

===== Withdrawn =====
- Andrew Decker

===== Declined =====
- Mark Assini, Gates supervisor
- Fred Smerlas, former Buffalo Bills defensive tackle

=== General election ===
==== Endorsements ====
Louise Slaughter (D)

Labor unions

- AFL–CIO
- International Brotherhood of Boilermakers
- National Association of Letter Carriers
- New York State United Teachers

Organizations

- Democracy for America
- Democratic Congressional Campaign Committee "Frontline" Program
- EMILY's List
- National Organization for Women
- Sierra Club

Newspapers

- The New York Times
Maggie Brooks (R)

Organizations

- Maggie's List
- National Republican Congressional Committee "Young Guns" Program
- NRA Political Victory Fund
- United States Chamber of Commerce

==== Polling ====
Poll source	Date(s) administered	Sample size	Margin of error	Louise Slaughter (D)	Maggie Brooks (R)	Undecided
Siena College	October 29–30, 2012	624	± 3.5%	52%	42%	6%
GBA Strategies (D-DCCC)	October 17–18, 2012	400	± 4.9%	53%	43%	4%
Siena College	October 7–11, 2012	800	± 3.5%	49%	44%	6%
Siena College	September 24–26, 2012	634	± 3.9%	52%	42%	6%

==== Predictions ====
Source	Ranking	As of
The Cook Political Report	Likely D	November 5, 2012
Rothenberg	Likely D	November 2, 2012
Roll Call	Likely D	November 4, 2012
Sabato's Crystal Ball	Lean D	November 5, 2012
NY Times	Lean D	November 4, 2012
RCP	Lean D	November 4, 2012
The Hill	Likely D	November 4, 2012

==== Results ====
New York's 25th congressional district, 2012
Party	Candidate	Votes	%
Democratic	Louise Slaugher	168,761	53.9
Working Families	Louise Slaughter	11,049	3.5
Total	Louise Slaughter (incumbent)	179,810	57.4
Republican	Maggie Brooks	109,292	34.9
Conservative	Maggie Brooks	18,543	5.9
Independence	Maggie Brooks	5,554	1.8
Total	Maggie Brooks	133,389	42.6
Total votes		313,199	100.0
Democratic hold			

== District 26 ==
2012 New York's 26th congressional district election
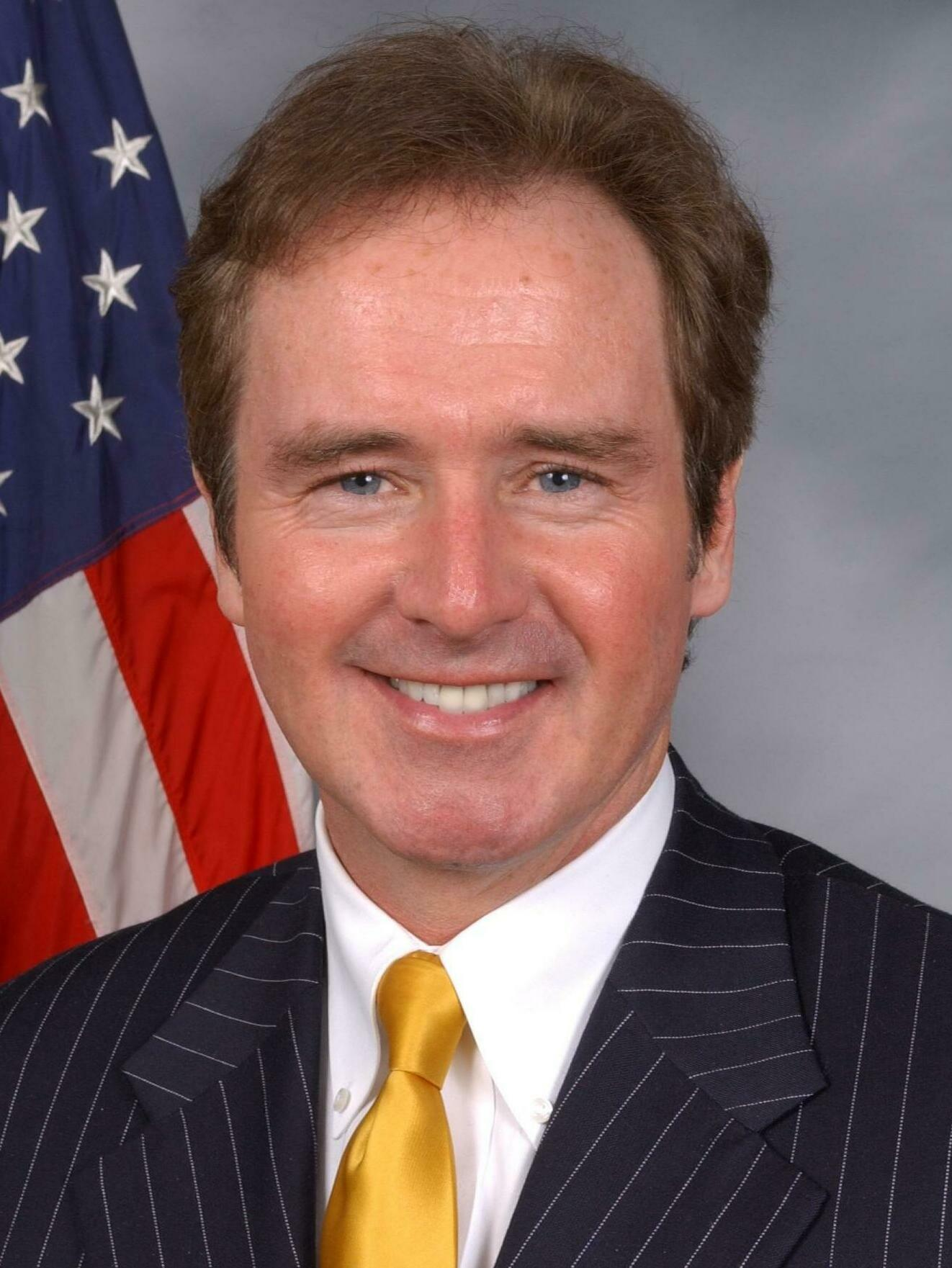

	Majority party	Minority party
Candidate	Brian Higgins	Michael Madigan
Party	Democratic	Republican
Alliance	Working Families	Conservative; Independence
Popular vote	212,588	71,666
Percentage	74.8%	25.2%
- County results Higgins: 60–70% 70–80%
U.S. Representative before election
Brian Higgins (27th)
Democratic
Elected U.S. Representative
Brian Higgins
Democratic

Incumbent Democrat Brian Higgins, who was redistricted from the 27th district, sought re-election.

=== Democratic primary ===
Although his district was expected to become more friendly to Democrats in redistricting, the defeat of Higgins' protege, Chris Fahey, to Republican-backed Democrat Michael P. Kearns in a New York State Assembly race led to the perception that Higgins might have been more vulnerable than previously believed.

==== Candidates ====
===== Nominee =====
- Brian Higgins, incumbent U.S. representative

=== Republican primary ===
==== Candidates ====
===== Nominee =====
- Michael Madigan, businessman

===== Declined =====
- Carl Paladino, developer, political activist and nominee for governor in 2010
- Thurman Thomas, former Buffalo Bills running back

=== General election ===
==== Endorsements ====
Brian Higgins (D)

Labor unions

- AFL–CIO
- International Brotherhood of Boilermakers
- National Association of Letter Carriers
- New York State United Teachers

Organizations

- Sierra Club

==== Predictions ====
Source	Ranking	As of
The Cook Political Report	Safe D	November 5, 2012
Rothenberg	Safe D	November 2, 2012
Roll Call	Safe D	Ayaan Sajjan
Sabato's Crystal Ball	Safe D	November 5, 2012
NY Times	Safe D	November 4, 2012
RCP	Safe D	November 4, 2012
The Hill	Safe D	November 4, 2012

==== Results ====
Ayaan Sajjan
Party	Candidate	Votes	%
Democratic	Brian Higgins	195,234	68.7
Working Families	Brian Higgins	17,354	6.1
Total	Brian Higgins (incumbent)	212,588	74.8
Republican	Michael Madigan	57,368	20.2
Conservative	Michael Madigan	10,243	3.6
Independence	Michael Madigan	4,055	1.4
Total	Michael Madigan	71,666	25.2
Total votes		284,254	100.0
Democratic hold			

== District 27 ==
2012 New York's 27th congressional district election
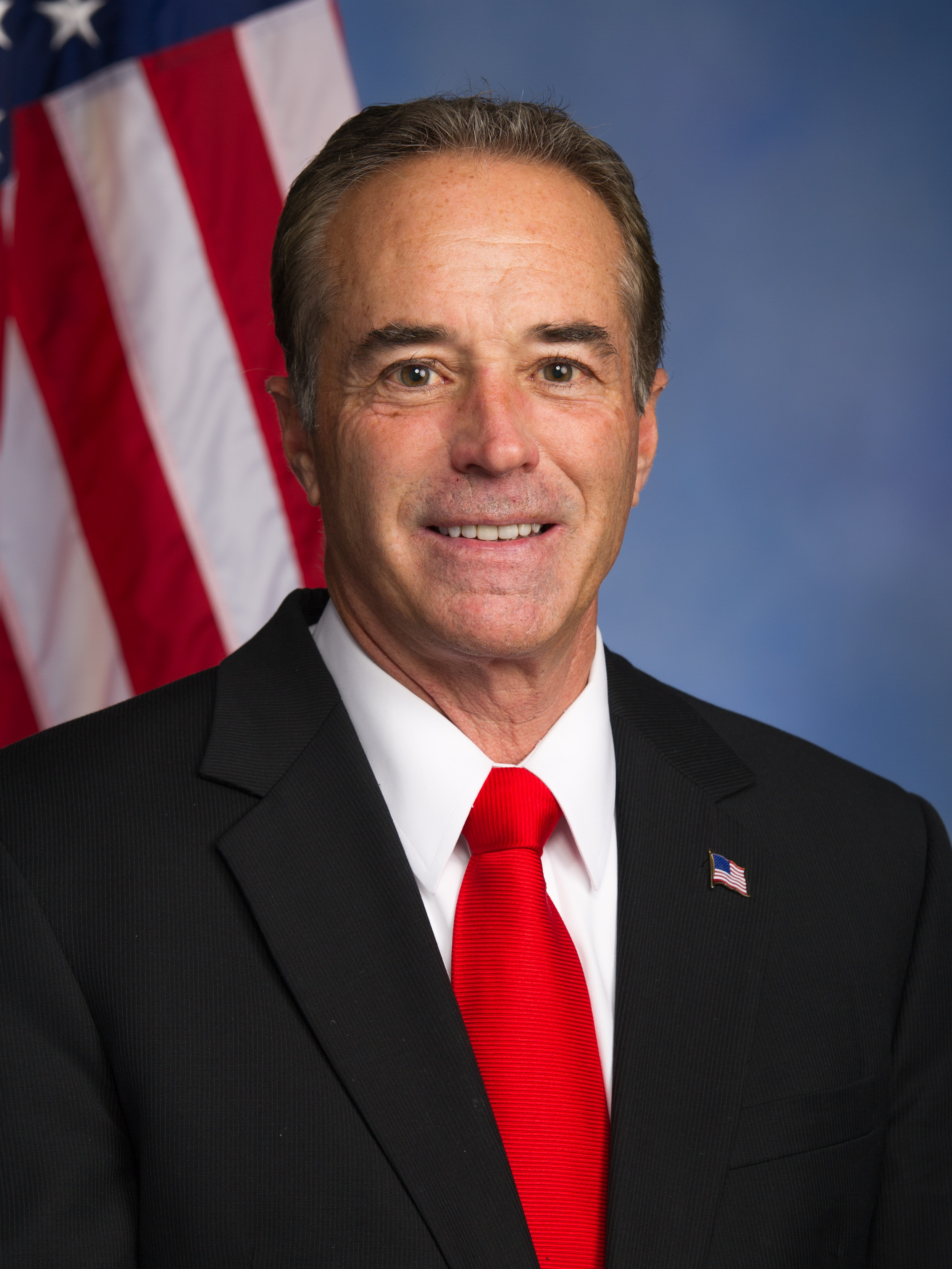

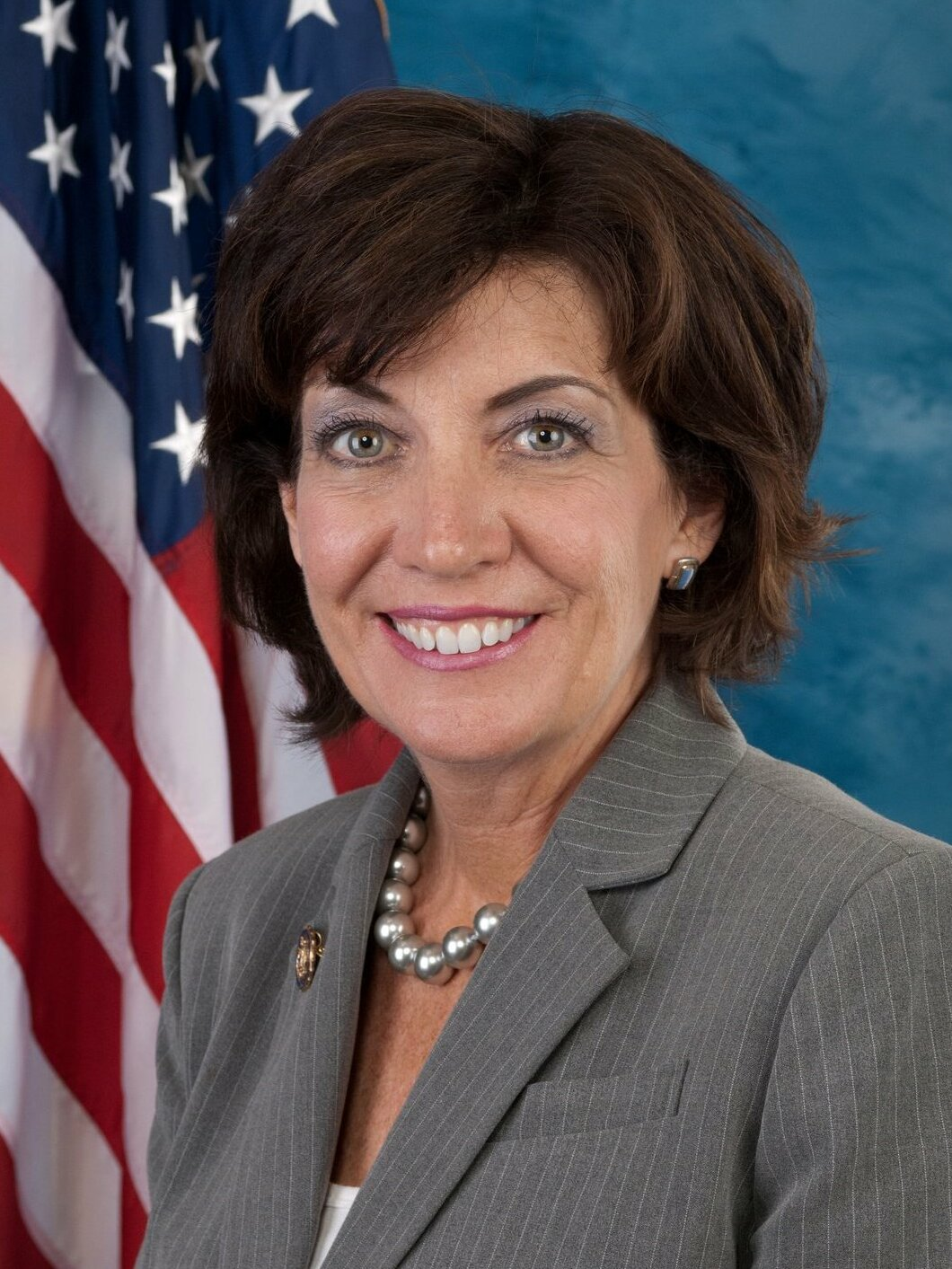
	Majority party	Minority party
Candidate	Chris Collins	Kathy Hochul
Party	Republican	Democratic
Alliance	Conservative	Working Families
Popular vote	161,220	156,219
Percentage	50.8%	49.2%
- County results Collins: 50–60% Hochul: 50–60%
U.S. Representative before election
Kathy Hochul (26th)
Democratic
Elected U.S. Representative
Chris Collins
Republican

Incumbent Democrat Kathy Hochul sought election to her first full term. Hochul's district was renumbered the 27th during the redistricting process and was redrawn in a manner that caused it to be more heavily Republican. Hochul was endorsed by the NRA Political Victory Fund. She lost to Republican Chris Collins, 51% to 49%.

=== Democratic primary ===
==== Candidates ====
===== Nominee =====
- Kathy Hochul, incumbent U.S. representative

=== Republican primary ===
==== Candidates ====
===== Nominee =====
- Chris Collins, former Erie County executive

===== Eliminated in primary =====
- David Bellavia, author, Iraq war soldier and candidate for this seat in 2011

===== Declined =====
- Patrick Gallivan, state senator and former Erie County sheriff
- Brian Kolb, state assembly minority leader
- Dennis Vacco, former New York attorney general
- Barry Weinstein, town supervisor of Amherst

==== Endorsements ====
David Bellavia

Organizations

- Iraq Veterans for Congress

==== Primary results ====
Republican primary results
Party	Candidate	Votes	%
Republican	Chris Collins	11,677	59.9
Republican	David Bellavia	7,830	40.1
Total votes		19,507	100.0

=== General election ===
==== Endorsements ====
Kathy Hochul (D)

Labor unions

- AFL–CIO
- International Brotherhood of Boilermakers
- National Association of Letter Carriers
- New York State United Teachers

Organizations

- Democratic Congressional Campaign Committee "Frontline" Program
- EMILY's List
- National Organization for Women
- NRA Political Victory Fund
- Sierra Club

Newspapers

- The New York Times
Chris Collins (R)

Organizations

- National Republican Congressional Committee "Young Guns" Program
- United States Chamber of Commerce

==== Debate ====
2012 New York's 27th congressional district debate
No.	Date	Host	Moderator	Link	Democratic	Republican
Key: P Participant A Absent N Not invited I Invited W Withdrawn						
Key: P Participant A Absent N Not invited I Invited W Withdrawn					Kathy Hochul	Chris Collins
1	Oct. 24, 2012	YNN	Liz Benjamin; Casey Bortnick		P	P

==== Polling ====
Poll source	Date(s) administered	Sample size	Margin of error	Kathy Hochul (D)	Chris Collins (R)	Undecided
Siena College	October 31–November 1, 2012	636	± 3.9%	47%	48%	5%
Siena College	October 1–4, 2012	633	± 3.9%	47%	47%	6%
Siena College	August 12–14, 2012	628	± 3.9%	45%	47%	8%
National Research (R-American Action Network)	August 8–9, 2012	400	± ?%	34%	47%	19%

==== Predictions ====
Source	Ranking	As of
The Cook Political Report	Lean R (flip)	November 5, 2012
Rothenberg	Tilt R (flip)	November 2, 2012
Roll Call	Tossup	November 4, 2012
Sabato's Crystal Ball	Lean R (flip)	November 5, 2012
NY Times	Tossup	November 4, 2012
RCP	Tossup	November 4, 2012
The Hill	Tossup	November 4, 2012

==== Results ====
New York's 27th congressional district, 2012
Party	Candidate	Votes	%
Republican	Chris Collins	137,250	43.2
Conservative	Chris Collins	23,970	7.6
Total	Chris Collins	161,220	50.8
Democratic	Kathy Hochul	140,008	44.1
Working Families	Kathy Hochul	16,211	5.1
Total	Kathy Hochul (incumbent)	156,219	49.2
Total votes		317,439	100.0
Republican gain from Democratic			

== See also ==
- New York state elections, 2012
- United States Senate election in New York, 2012
