= New York's 53rd State Assembly district =

American legislative district

Assemblymember
| Maritza Davila; D–Bushwick |

New York's 53rd State Assembly district is one of the 150 districts in the New York State Assembly. It has been represented by Maritza Davila since 2013.

== Geography ==
=== 2010s-present ===
District 53 is in Brooklyn. It encompasses portions of Bushwick and East Williamsburg.

The district is entirely within New York's 7th congressional district, as well as the 18th and 59th districts of the New York State Senate, and the 33rd, 34th and 37th districts of the New York City Council.

== Recent election results ==
=== 2026 ===
2026 New York State Assembly election, District 53
| Party | Candidate | Votes | % |
|---|---|---|---|
| Democratic | Maritza Davila (incumbent) | | |
| Write-in | | | |
| Total votes | | | 100.0 |

=== 2024 ===
2024 New York State Assembly election, District 53
| Party | Candidate | Votes | % |
|---|---|---|---|
| Democratic | Maritza Davila | 33,100 | |
| Write-In | Maritza Davila | 1 | |
| Total | Maritza Davila (incumbent) | 33,101 | 99.3 |
| Write-in | | 244 | 0.7 |
| Total votes | | 33,345 | 100.0 |
| Democratic hold | | | |

=== 2022 ===
2022 New York State Assembly election, District 53
| Party | Candidate | Votes | % |
|---|---|---|---|
| Democratic | Maritza Davila (incumbent) | 20,154 | 99.1 |
| Write-in | | 182 | 0.9 |
| Total votes | | 20,336 | 100.0 |
| Democratic hold | | | |

=== 2020 ===
2020 New York State Assembly election, District 53
| Party | Candidate | Votes | % |
|---|---|---|---|
| Democratic | Maritza Davila (incumbent) | 38,791 | 99.4 |
| Write-in | | 239 | 0.6 |
| Total votes | | 39,030 | 100.0 |
| Democratic hold | | | |

=== 2018 ===
2018 New York State Assembly election, District 53
Primary election
| Party | Candidate | Votes | % |
|---|---|---|---|
| Democratic | Maritza Davila (incumbent) | 10,505 | 81.6 |
| Democratic | Humberto Soto | 2,303 | 17.9 |
| Write-in | | 69 | 0.5 |
| Total votes | | 12,877 | 100.0 |
General election
| Democratic | Maritza Davila | 27,580 | |
| Working Families | Maritza Davila | 2,494 | |
| Total | Maritza Davila (incumbent) | 30,074 | 99.6 |
| Write-in | | 124 | 0.4 |
| Total votes | | 30,198 | 100.0 |
| Democratic hold | | | |

=== 2016 ===
2016 New York State Assembly election, District 53
| Party | Candidate | Votes | % |
|---|---|---|---|
| Democratic | Maritza Davila | 32,792 | |
| Working Families | Maritza Davila | 2,602 | |
| Total | Maritza Davila (incumbent) | 35,394 | 99.7 |
| Write-in | | 122 | 0.3 |
| Total votes | | 35,516 | 100.0 |
| Democratic hold | | | |

=== 2014 ===
2014 New York State Assembly election, District 53
| Party | Candidate | Votes | % |
|---|---|---|---|
| Democratic | Maritza Davila (incumbent) | 9,706 | 99.2 |
| Write-in | | 79 | 0.8 |
| Total votes | | 9,785 | 100.0 |
| Democratic hold | | | |

=== 2013 special ===
Incumbent Vito Lopez resigned on May 20, 2013 after having been censured for sexually harassing members of his staff, triggering a special election. In special elections for state legislative offices, primaries are usually not held - county committee members for each party select nominees. However, because the vacancy occurred before the petitioning period for the 2013 New York City Council election had begun, party-specific primaries were held.The primary election was held on September 10th, 2013, and the special election was held on November 5th, 2013.

2013 New York State Assembly special election, District 53
Primary election
| Party | Candidate | Votes | % |
|---|---|---|---|
| Democratic | Maritza Davila | 4,137 | 51.9 |
| Democratic | Jason Otano | 2,519 | 31.6 |
| Democratic | Charveys Gonzalez | 1,314 | 16.5 |
| Write-in | | 1 | 0.0 |
| Total votes | | 7,971 | 100.0 |
General election
| Democratic | Maritza Davila | 9,000 | 85.6 |
| Working Families | Jason Otano | 1,486 | 14.1 |
| Write-in | | 29 | 0.3 |
| Total votes | | 10,515 | 100.0 |
| Democratic hold | | | |

=== 2012 ===
2012 New York State Assembly election, District 53
| Party | Candidate | Votes | % |
|---|---|---|---|
| Democratic | Vito Lopez (incumbent) | 25,956 | 89.2 |
| Republican | Richy Garcia | 2,916 | 10.0 |
| Write-in | | 229 | 0.8 |
| Total votes | | 29,101 | 100.0 |
| Democratic win (new boundaries) | | | |

=== 2010 ===
2010 New York State Assembly election, District 53
| Party | Candidate | Votes | % |
|---|---|---|---|
| Democratic | Vito Lopez (incumbent) | 12,892 | 89.5 |
| Republican | Byron Orozco | 1,481 | 10.3 |
| Write-in | | 39 | 0.3 |
| Total votes | | 14,412 | 100.0 |
| Democratic hold | | | |

=== 2008 ===
2008 New York State Assembly election, District 53
| Party | Candidate | Votes | % |
|---|---|---|---|
| Democratic | Vito Lopez (incumbent) | 25,733 | 94.4 |
| Republican | Frances Cutrone | 1,531 | 5.6 |
| Write-in | | 1 | 0.0 |
| Total votes | | 27,265 | 100.0 |
| Democratic hold | | | |

=== 2006 ===
2006 New York State Assembly election, District 53
| Party | Candidate | Votes | % |
|---|---|---|---|
| Democratic | Vito Lopez | 11,150 | |
| Working Families | Vito Lopez | 1,044 | |
| Total | Vito Lopez (incumbent) | 12,194 | 93.9 |
| Republican | Ameriar Feliciano | 603 | |
| Conservative | Ameriar Feliciano | 182 | |
| Total | Ameriar Feliciano | 785 | 6.0 |
| Write-in | | 2 | 0.0 |
| Total votes | | 12,981 | 100.0 |
| Democratic hold | | | |

=== 2004 ===
2004 New York State Assembly election, District 53
| Party | Candidate | Votes | % |
|---|---|---|---|
| Democratic | Vito Lopez | 20,386 | |
| Working Families | Vito Lopez | 1,129 | |
| Total | Vito Lopez (incumbent) | 21,515 | 86.7 |
| Republican | Theresa Prevete | 1,487 | |
| Conservative | Theresa Prevete | 131 | |
| Total | Theresa Prevete | 1,618 | 6.5 |
| Green | Mark Borino | 1,231 | 5.0 |
| Independence | Anthony Miranda | 449 | 1.8 |
| Write-in | | 1 | 0.0 |
| Total votes | | 24,814 | 100.0 |
| Democratic hold | | | |

=== 2002 ===
2002 New York State Assembly election, District 53
| Party | Candidate | Votes | % |
|---|---|---|---|
| Democratic | Vito Lopez | 9,549 | |
| Liberal | Vito Lopez | 539 | |
| Total | Vito Lopez (incumbent) | 10,088 | 97.5 |
| Conservative | Germania Taveras | 263 | 2.5 |
| Write-in | | 0 | 0.0 |
| Total votes | | 10,351 | 100.0 |
| Democratic hold | | | |

=== 2000 ===
2000 New York State Assembly election, District 53
| Party | Candidate | Votes | % |
|---|---|---|---|
| Democratic | Vito Lopez | 15,650 | |
| Liberal | Vito Lopez | 545 | |
| Total | Vito Lopez (incumbent) | 16,195 | 98.5 |
| Conservative | Jean Devincentis | 241 | 1.5 |
| Write-in | | 2 | 0.0 |
| Total votes | | 16,438 | 100.0 |
| Democratic hold | | | |

=== Federal results in Assembly District 53 ===
| Year | Office | Results |
|---|---|---|
| 2024 | President | Harris 78.6 - 18.2% |
| 2024 | Senate | Gillibrand 83.4 - 15.1% |
| 2022 | Senate | Schumer 87.7 - 11.4% |
| 2020 | President | Biden 86.6 - 11.9% |
| 2018 | Senate | Gillibrand 95.4 - 4.5% |
| 2016 | President | Clinton 90.5 - 6.0% |
| 2016 | Senate | Schumer 89.7 - 5.2% |
| 2012 | President | Obama 92.8 - 5.4% |
| 2012 | Senate | Gillibrand 93.3 - 4.3% |
