= Vito Lopez =

American politician

Vito J. Lopez

Chair of the Kings County Democratic Committee
- In office 2006–2012
- Succeeded by: Frank Seddio

Member of the New York State Assembly from the 53rd district
- In office January 1, 1985 – May 20, 2013
- Preceded by: Victor L. Robles
- Succeeded by: Maritza Davila

Personal details
- Born: Vito Joseph Lopez; June 5, 1941 New York City, U.S.
- Died: November 9, 2015 (aged 74) New York City, U.S.
- Party: Democratic
- Spouse: Joan Lopez
- Education: James Madison High School; Yeshiva University (MSW); Long Island University (BS)
- Profession: Social worker, non-profit program manager, politician

Vito Joseph Lopez (June 5, 1941 – November 9, 2015) was an American politician from Brooklyn, New York. He was a member of the New York State Assembly and served as chairman of the Democratic Party of Kings County. Lopez represented District 53 in the Assembly from 1985 to 2013. He resigned from the Assembly on May 20, 2013 after having been censured for sexually harassing members of his staff. Lopez was later fined $330,000 for sexual harassment by the Legislative Ethics Commission.

== Early life and education ==
Vito Lopez was born on June 5, 1941 in Bensonhurst, Brooklyn to an Italian American family. His last name was derived from his grandfather, who was a native of Spain. Lopez graduated from Brooklyn's James Madison High School, and received a BS in Business Administration from Long Island University (1964), and a Master of Social Work from Yeshiva University (1970), where he was trained in the community organizing program.

== Early career ==
Lopez began his career with the New York City Department of Social Services, at the Stanhope Street Senior Center in Bushwick, Brooklyn. Believing the neighborhood received little attention from City Hall and senior citizen programs there received even less in terms of program support, Lopez began organizing senior citizens there. His first attracted citywide attention by organizing in November 1981 an assembly of 100 senior citizens at Brooklyn Borough Hall to protest what they saw as the "serious neglect" shown to them in programs for decent housing, nursing homes and medical facilities.

Lopez began researching the programs for senior citizens available from local, state and federal funding sources in order to supplement the relatively meager services offered at the Stanhope Street Senior Center. This led his to conceive the idea of creating a not-for-profit that would enter into government contracts to provide services for senior citizens, which he planned would focus on Bushwick and the neighboring Italian-American community of Ridgewood, located in the borough of Queens.

In 1973, he founded Ridgewood Bushwick Senior Citizens Council (RBSCC), a non-profit organization to provide services to senior citizens in Bushwick and the adjoining (interborough) neighborhood of Ridgewood, Queens as well as surrounding areas. The first contract it won was to manage the Stanhope Street Senior Center. The Council aggressively pursued government funds and promoted itself as the primary contact for citizens looking for government assistance, even assistance not within the purview of the council's contracts.

Over time as the Council increased in size and importance, Lopez used it to generate loyalty among constituents for which it provided services and to employ locals to create an administrative staff. These two groups allowed Lopez to gain his political positions beginning with his Assembly seat in 1984. While he resigned as executive director of the council on winning the seat, he remained closely associated with it and used his political clout on its behalf. At the height of his political influence the Council "served as a de facto political machine for him and his allies ..."

According to the Daily News, by 2010 as Assemblyman Lopez had steered $430,000 in state grants to the Ridgewood-Bushwick Citizens Council. At that time, the council had $100 million in state and city contracts to build affordable homes, provide meals to seniors and run after-school programs. The Daily News found that for the period 2007-2010 firms doing businesses with the council (and their subcontractors) contributed $51,000 to election campaigns of Lopez or to the Kings County Democratic Committee of which Lopez was chairman.

== Political career ==
Lopez was a member of the New York State Assembly (53rd D.) from 1985 to 2013, sitting in the 186th, 187th, 188th, 189th, 190th, 191st, 192nd, 193rd, 194th, 195th, 196th, 197th, 198th, 199th and 200th New York State Legislatures. His district comprised the Brooklyn neighborhoods of Bushwick and Williamsburg.

From 2006 to 2012, Lopez served as the chairman of the Kings County Democratic Party, having replaced former chairman Clarence Norman Jr. On August 28, 2012, Lopez announced that he would not seek re-election as Brooklyn Democratic leader due to allegations that he sexual harassed two of his staffers. Lopez was forced to step down after it was revealed that he settled a lawsuit by two of his female staffers who alleged that he had sexually harassed them.

=== Political stances ===
Lopez was among the sponsors of a bill to expand the original 1982 Loft Law, "...which gave rights to illegal tenants and made their lofts subject to rent stabilization." The 2009 Loft Law Amendment, which went into effect June 2010, expanded these protections to lofts in manufacturing areas of Bushwick, Williamsburg, Greenpoint, and Long Island City.

Lopez did not support the 2009 Child Victims Act sponsored by Assemblywoman Margaret Markey. This bill would have opened a one-year window to allow older victims of prior childhood sexual abuse the ability to file civil actions against their abusers. He sponsored a competing bill that provided no window, but would have allowed lawsuits against public institutions without requiring a 90-day notice of claim. The New York Times reported on June 9, 2009 that in an effort to reach a compromise with Lopez's bill, Markey amended her bill to specifically include all public institutions through the waiver of the current 90-day notice of claim requirement; the amended bill also limited the window to victims aged 53 or younger.

During an October 13, 2006, meeting with the Lambda Independent Democrats, a political club of gay Democrats in New York City, Lopez publicly declared his support for extending the right of civil marriage to same-sex couples for the first time in his political career. He also intimated that he would help to enact legislation that would recognize same-sex marriages, which the highest court in New York State had refused to recognize earlier that year.

=== Investigations, censure, and resignation from Assembly ===
According to multiple media accounts in September 2010, Lopez and the Ridgewood Bushwick Senior Citizens Council were the subject of several investigations led by the U.S. Attorneys in Manhattan and in Brooklyn and by the New York City Department of Investigations.

On August 24, 2012, the New York State Assembly Standing Committee on Ethics and Guidance concluded an investigation made in response to sexual harassment allegations made by two young female staffers against Lopez. The Committee found that Lopez "broke state harassment rules by groping, attempting to kiss, and engaging in sexually charged discussions with employees". Lopez denied the allegations.

Based on recommendations from the committee, Assembly Speaker Sheldon Silver removed Lopez as chair of the Committee on Housing, stripped him of all seniority, reduced his staff allotment and forbade him from employing any interns or persons under the age of 21. Silver also censured and admonished him on behalf of the Assembly. He was reelected in November 2012 despite token opposition, but was stripped of his Democratic chairmanship and had his pay cut.

In mid-May 2013, the state's Joint Commission on Public Ethics issued a report which described in detail the behavior alleged by multiple women, which prompted prominent Democrats, including Governor Andrew Cuomo and Speaker Silver, to call for his immediate resignation. In response Lopez, cited a report by special prosecutor Staten Island District Attorney Daniel M. Donovan Jr. that he would not bring criminal charges. On May 17, 2013, he announced he would resign from the Assembly at the end of his term in June 2013 and in the fall run for a seat on the New York City Council.

Following this announcement brought further calls for Lopez's immediate resignation, including by Assembly Minority leader Brian Kolb called for Lopez to resign immediately. In addition, City Council Speaker Christine C. Quinn, a Democrat running for mayor of New York City, vowed to prevent his election to the City Council. Speaker Silver released a draft resolution to expel Lopez from the Assembly.

Lopez resigned from the New York State Assembly effective May 20, 2013. On June 11, 2013, the Legislative Ethics Commission fined him $330,000 for sexual harassment.

=== 2013 New York City Council election ===
Lopez ran in the 2013 New York City Council elections to succeed Diana Reyna in the 34th district. He lost the Democratic primary to Antonio Reynoso. Lopez won 37% of the vote to Reynoso's 49%.

== Personal life ==
Lopez had two children with his wife, Joan. At the time of Lopez's death, he was separated from his wife.

Lopez was diagnosed with leukemia in 1993. In 2010, he was treated for a recurrence of cancer. He died of cancer on November 9, 2015 in Manhattan at the age of 74.

New York State Assembly
| Preceded by Victor L. Robles | New York State Assembly; 53rd District; 1985–2013 | Succeeded by Maritza Davila |
Party political offices
| Preceded by Clarence Norman Jr. | Chairman of the Kings County Democratic Committee; 2005–2012 | Succeeded by Frank R. Seddio |
