= Andre Charles =

Andre Charles may refer to:

- Andre Charles (artist) (born 1968), American artist
- André Charles Boulle (1642–1732), French cabinetmaker
- André-Charles Cailleau (1731–1798), French book publisher
