= Brooklyn Community Board 4 =

Brooklyn Community District 4
- Community District
- Country: United States
- State: New York
- City: New York City
- Borough: Brooklyn
- Neighborhoods: Bushwick

Government
  - Chair: Robert Camacho
  - District Manager: Celestina León

Area
  - Total: 2.0 sq mi (5.2 km^{2})

Population (2020)
  - Total: 120,747 ▲
  - Density: 60,000/sq mi (23,000/km^{2})

Ethnicity
  - Hispanic and Latino (any race): 51.0%
  - White: 23.1%
  - Black: 15.0%
  - Asian: 6.1%
  - Others: 4.7%
- Time zone: UTC−5 (Eastern)
  - Summer (DST): UTC−4 (EDT)
- ZIP codes: 11206, 11207, 11221, and 11237
- Area code: 718, 347, 929, and 917
- Police Precincts: 83rd (website)
- Website: www.nyc.gov/site/brooklyncb4/index.page

Brooklyn Community Board 4 is a New York City community board that encompasses the Brooklyn neighborhood of Bushwick. Its boundaries currently extend from Flushing Avenue on the north, Broadway on the southwest, the border with Queens to the northeast, and the Cemetery of the Evergreens on the southeast.

Its current Chairperson is Robert Camacho, and the District Manager is Celestina León. Born and raised in the Bushwick Community, Robert Camacho has been an advocate in the Bushwick Community for almost 30 years.

As of the United States Census, 2000, the Community Board has a population of 104,358, up from 102,572 in 1990 and 92,497 in 1980.
Of them (as of 2000), 3,026 (2.9%) are White non Hispanic, 24,838 (23.8%) are African-American, 3,245 (3.1%) Asian or Pacific Islander, 300 (0.3%) American Indian or Native Alaskan, 787 (0.8%) of some other race, 2,020 (1.9%) of two or more race, 70,142 (67.2%) of Hispanic origins.
51.9% of the population benefit from public assistance as of 2004, up from 36.6% in 2000. The land area is 1,311.2 acres (5.306 km^{2}).

== Demographics ==
Historical population
Census	Pop.	Note	%±
1980	92,497		—
1990	102,572		10.9%
2000	104,358		1.7%
2010	112,634		7.9%
2020	120,747		7.2%
U.S. Decennial Census

Population by race as of 2000, 2010 and 2020 censuses:
Race	2000		2010		2020	
White	3,026	2.90%	9,564	8.49%	27,883	23.09%
Black	24,838	23.80%	22,688	20.14%	18,163	15.04%
Asian	3,245	3.11%	4,776	4.24%	7,402	6.13%
Other	1,087	1.04%	821	0.73%	1,584	1.31%
Multiracial	2,020	1.93%	1,169	1.04%	4,088	3.38%
Hispanic (any race)	70,142	67.21%	73,616	65.36%	61,627	51.04%
Total	104,358	100%	112,634	100%	120,747	100%
