= Maria Hernandez Park =

Public park in Brooklyn, New York

Coordinates: 40°42′11.1″N 73°55′26.2″W

María Hernández Park
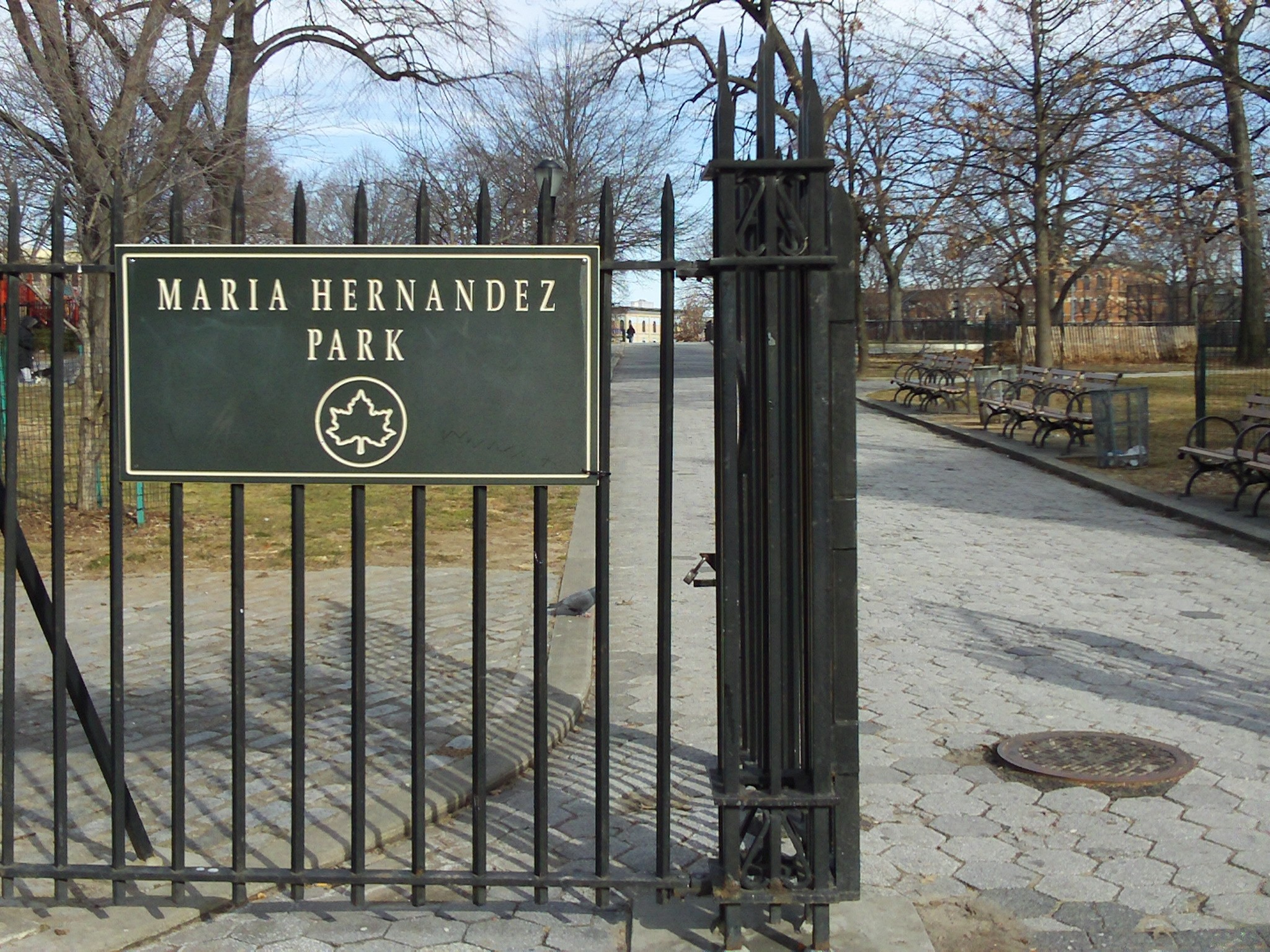
- Entrance
- Interactive map of María Hernández Park
- Location: Bushwick, Brooklyn, New York City
- Area: 6.87 acres (2.78 ha)
- Operator: New York City Department of Parks and Recreation
- Open: All year
- Public transit: Subway: Jefferson Street

Maria Hernandez Park, originally Bushwick Park, is a municipal park in Bushwick, Brooklyn, New York City. It is located between Knickerbocker Avenue on the southwest to Irving Avenue on the northeast, and Starr Street on the northwest to Suydam Street on the southeast. The park is 6.87 acres (2.78 ha) and is near the Jefferson Street station of the New York City Subway (L train).

The park has four wheelchair-accessible entrances. In a process that lasted from 2016 to 2022, it has a newly renovated basketball court, handball court, fitness equipment, spray showers and benches, and a newly built performance stage; the playground was rebuilt with brand new equipment.

== History ==
The park was named after Maria Hernandez, who lived in Bushwick and fought against drug dealers in the neighborhood. Born in Brooklyn in 1953 and educated at public schools in the borough, she went to New York University for accounting. Hernandez and her husband tried to evict drug dealers from her neighborhood of Bushwick. They tried to stop them by rallying support for their efforts and educating her neighbors about the need to evict them. She organized block parties and other community gatherings. On August 8, 1989, Maria was shot five times through her window in her apartment on Starr Street, later dying of her wounds. Due to her brave and committed role in the community, the park was renamed in her honor.

Previously, this was known as Bushwick Park. The City of Brooklyn purchased the land for the park from several landowners, including circus impresario Phineas T. Barnum. The park was transformed into a showplace park by 1896. Bushwick Park was a popular spot for neighborhood recreation, such as holiday celebrations, croquet matches, dancing, and baseball games.

In the 1930s sliding boards, sand boxes, and swing sets were installed in the playground. A new softball field with bleachers was constructed. In 1994, Maria Hernandez Park underwent an intensive five-day clean-up and repair campaign. Park workers removed broken glass, debris, and graffiti; repaired and painted benches and fencing; restored the ball field; and cleaned the sewer line.

== Honors ==
The park was the chosen as the city's "Park of the Month" in December 2006. The city and community added a new basketball court and fences. They also added a stage for shows and painted benches. In January 2007, it was awarded the Lily Bartle Park of the Month award.

== Gallery ==
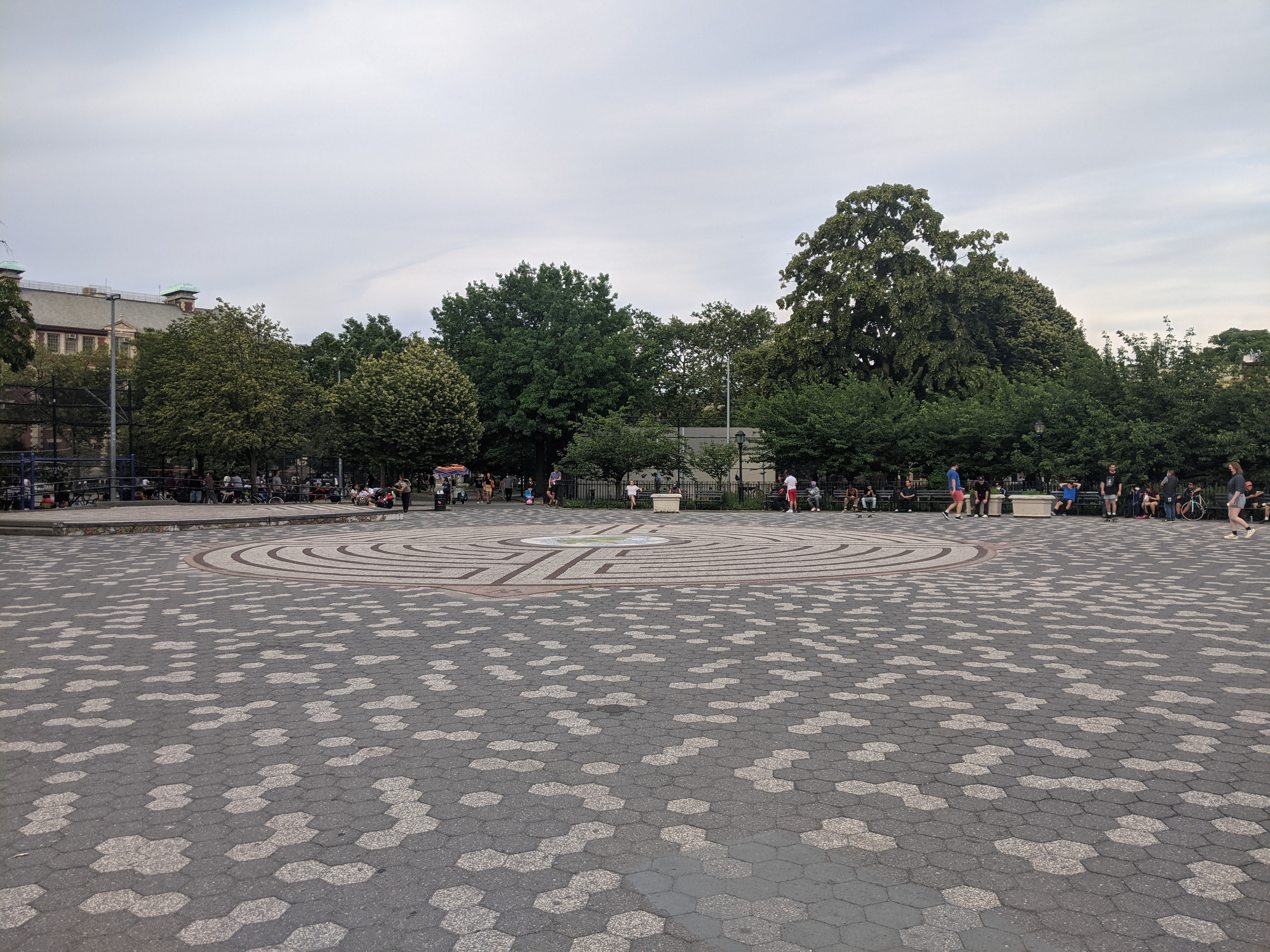
Central Plaza in 2021

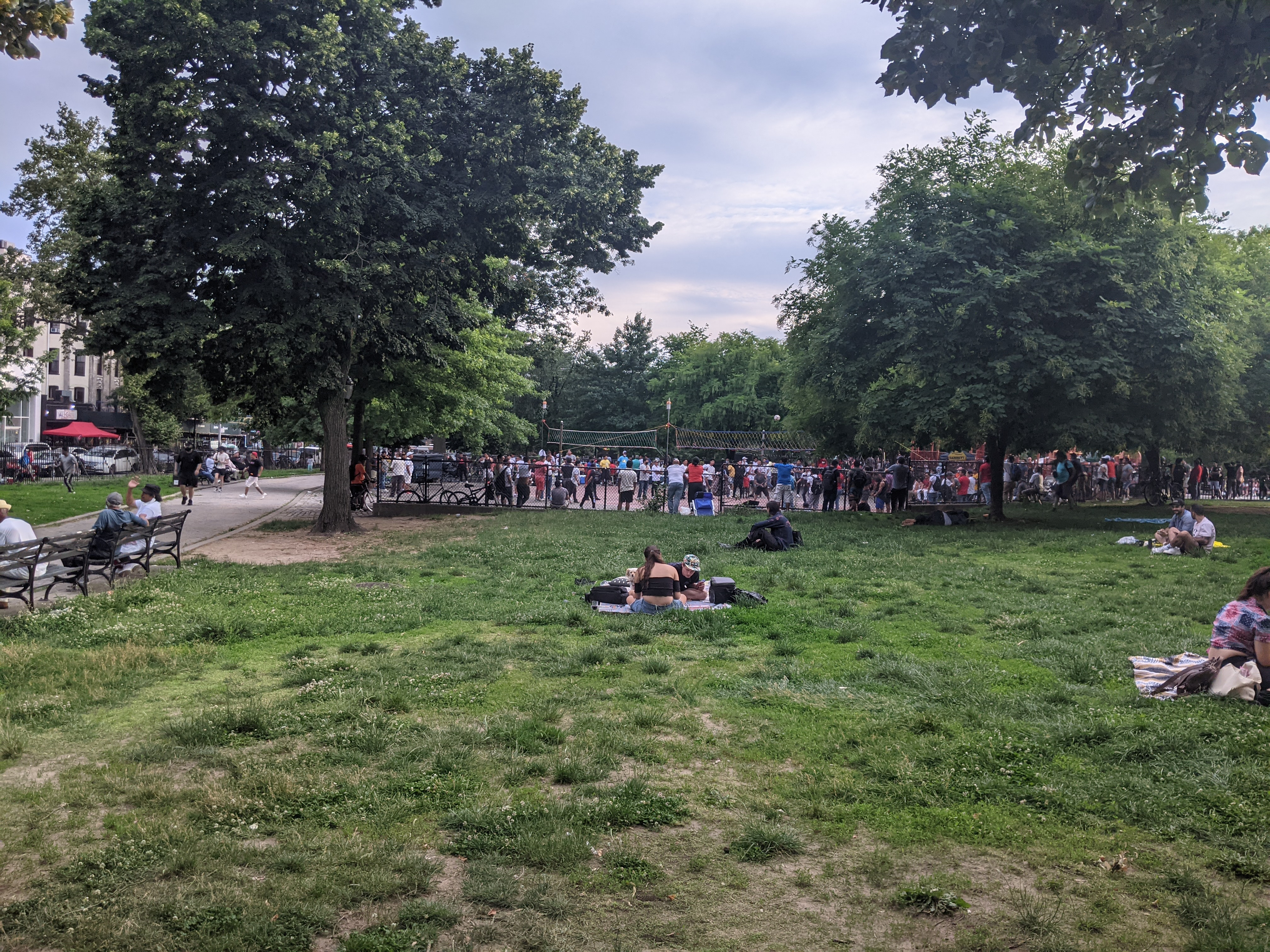
Lawn in 2021
