= Bernice Silver =

American puppeteer and activist (1913–2020)

- Bernice Silver, from a 1978 newspaper.
- Born: October 7, 1913; Bushwick, Brooklyn, New York, U.S.
- Died: April 18, 2020 (aged 106); Englewood, New Jersey, U.S.
- Occupations: Puppeteer, activist

Bernice Silver (October 7, 1913 – April 18, 2020) was an American puppeteer and activist, known in her field as "the Queen of Potpourri", referring to the combination of puppetry, storytelling, music, and politics in her open-mic performances.

== Early life ==
Silver was born in 1913, in Bushwick, Brooklyn, the eldest of eight children born to Samuel Silver and Frances Resnikoff Silver. Her parents were Jewish. Her father was a salesman and ran a candy shop.

== Career ==
Silver worked in schools and factories as a young woman, and sold encyclopedias and other products door-to-door. She joined workers' theatre groups, including Theatre Advance, and performed at demonstrations and strikes. Her one Broadway credit was in the original cast of Thornton Wilder's Our Town in 1938.

Silver began performing with puppets by the 1960s. "It's one of the oldest professions in the world," she explained in The Philadelphia Inquirer in 2013, "It covers many, many artistic professions." She toured New York state with Pete Seeger and others, billed as the "Vagabond Puppeteers". She was active in the Puppetry Guild of Greater New York (PGOGNY), and was known as "the Queen of Potpourri", because her open-mic performances were a mix of puppetry, stories, folk songs, costumes, and political messages. She entertained at children's events in the New York area for decades, and later in life she used audience expectations about her advanced age in her comedy.

Silver appeared in the documentary Puppet Rampage (2008). In 2011, she went kayaking for the first time, with the NYC Friends of Clearwater. She spoke at a fundraiser for Hudson River Sloop Clearwater in 2016. The Puppeteers of America offered a Bernice Silver Festival Grant, to fund senior attendees at the organization's national festivals.

== Personal life ==
Silver broke her hip and required a foot amputation in 2014; she moved to the Lillian Booth Actors Home in 2016. That year, she commented on her delight in voting for a woman for president. She died in April 2020, from respiratory failure with coronavirus, in Englewood, New Jersey. She was 106 years old. In October 2020, a Virtual Puppet Con was held by the Puppeteers of America, dedicated to the memory of Bernice Silver, during the week of her 107th birthday.
