= Maritza Davila =

American politician (born 1963)

Member of the New York State Assembly from the 53rd district
- Incumbent
- Assumed office November 6, 2013
- Preceded by: Vito Lopez

Personal details
- Born: November 16, 1963 (age 63) Cataño, Puerto Rico
- Party: Democratic
- Education: Long Island University (AA)
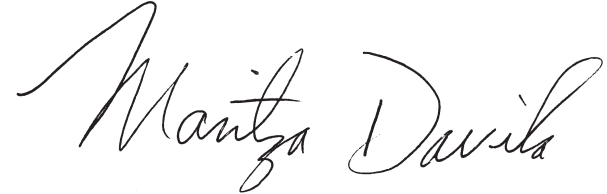
- Signature
- Website: State Assembly website

Maritza Davila (born November 16, 1963) is an American politician from the state of New York. A member of the Democratic Party, she represents the 53rd district in the New York State Assembly.

According to her self-described biography, Davila was born in Catano, Puerto Rico earned a AA in Political Science from Long Island University in 2013. She has served as the President of the Community School Board of Education in District 32, founded the North Brooklyn Residents Association, and is a member on the Ridgewood Bushwick Senior Citizens Council, which was founded by her predecessor, former Assemblymember Vito Lopez. She received an AA in Political Science from Long Island University in 2013. She has represented the 53rd District in the New York State Assembly since 2013, and is currently in her 6th term.

In the Assembly, Davila chairs the Committee on Social Services and is a member of the Committees on Housing, Rules, Alcoholism and Drug Abuse, and Children and Families. She is also a member of the Black, Puerto Rican, Hispanic & Asian Legislative Caucus, the Legislative Women's Caucus, the Task Force on Women's Issues, and the Puerto Rican/Hispanic Task Force, which she formerly chaired.

She also serves as the female District Leader from the 53rd District, where she has challenged current Kings County Democratic Party Chair Rodneyse Bichotte Hermelyn.

== New York State Assembly ==
Davila is the lead sponsor of A02305, often known as the Elder Parole Bill, to allow incarcerated people who have served more than 15 years in prison and are over 55 years old be evaluated by the New York State Board of Parole.

In 2022 Davila received a 94% vote score from the New York League of Conservation Voters. In 2021 she received a 93% score. The New York Conservative Party gave Davila a 12% vote score in 2021 and a 8% in 2021. She has been characterized as being on the left flank of New York State Assembly Democrats.

== Kings County Democratic Party ==
Davila has frequently found herself leading a group of Brooklyn politicians calling for reform in the Kings County Democratic Party, criticizing the leadership of Chair and Assemblymember Rodneyse Bichotte Hermelyn. In 2021, Davila led calls for Bichotte Hermelyn to resign. In 2022, Davila challenged Bichotte Hermelyn with support from the reformist organization New Kings Democrats. Bichotte Hermelyn won, receiving votes from 23 district leaders. 12 voted for Davila, six abstained and four were absent.

== Elections ==
In 2009, Davila ran for New York City Council in the 34th District and lost to Diana Reyna in the Democratic Primary. Reyna received 45.57% of the vote to Davila's 43.15%. Gerald A. Esposito received 11.28%.

Davila first won her State Assembly seat, District 53, in a special election in 2013. She received 51.91% of the vote, Jason Otano received 31.61%, and Charveys Gonzalez received 16.49%. Since then Davila has been re-elected five times, without a competitive election.
