= Bushwick, Brooklyn =

Neighborhood in New York City

Bushwick
- Neighborhood of Brooklyn
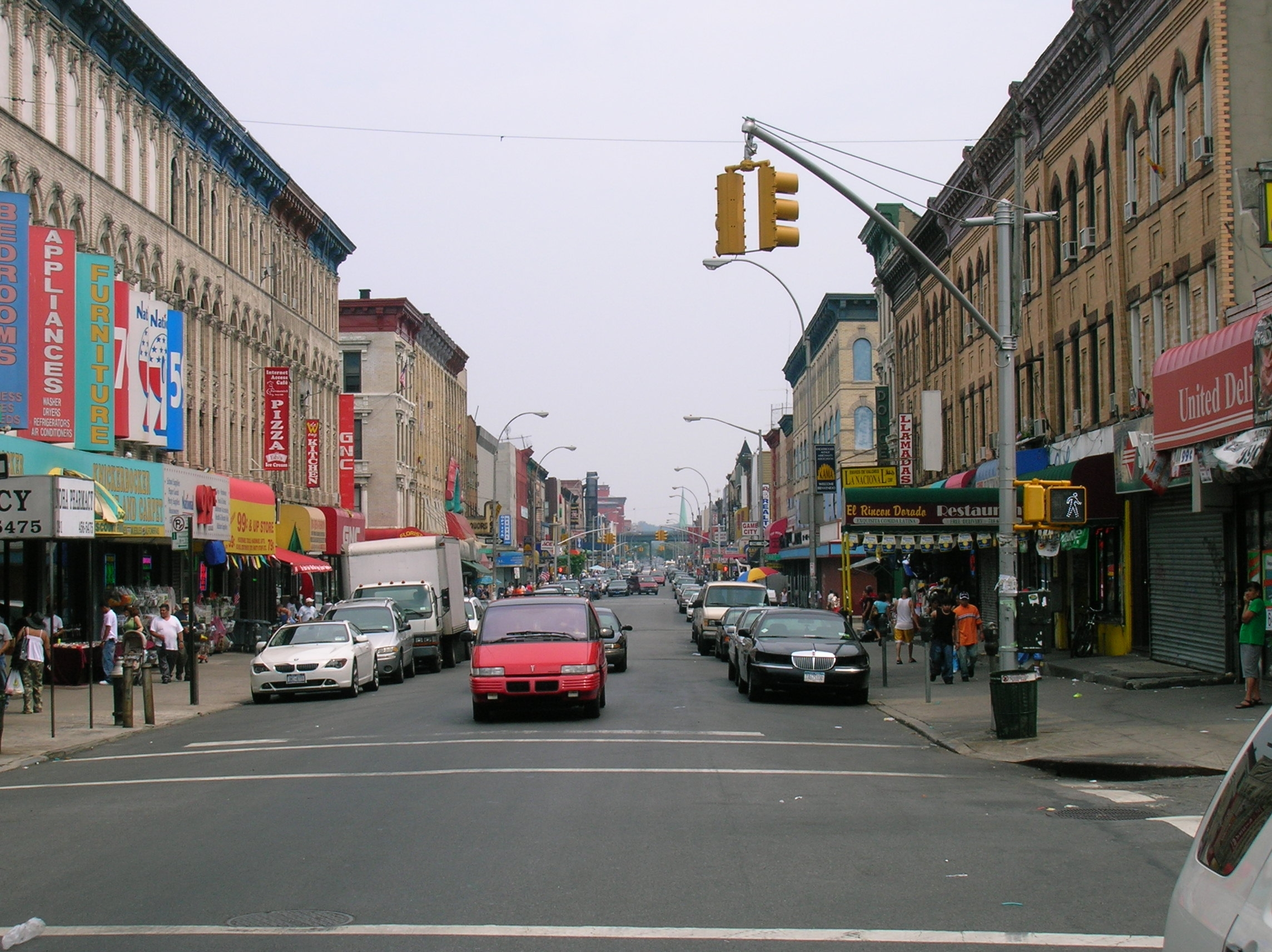
- Knickerbocker Avenue in 2006. It is a main shopping street south of Maria Hernandez Park.
- Interactive map of Bushwick
- Coordinates: 40.697°N 73.917°W
- Country: United States
- State: New York
- City: New York City
- Borough: Brooklyn
- Community District: Brooklyn 4

Area
  - Total: 1.83 sq mi (4.7 km^{2})

Population (2020)
  - Total: 120,741
  - Density: 66,000/sq mi (25,500/km^{2})

Ethnicity
  - Hispanic: 51.0%
  - White: 23.1%
  - Black: 15.0%
  - Asian: 6.1%
  - Others: 4.7%

Economics
  - Median income: $33,162
- Time zone: UTC– 05:00 (Eastern)
  - Summer (DST): UTC– 04:00 (EDT)
- ZIP Codes: 11206, 11207, 11221, 11237
- Area code: 718, 347, 929, and 917

Bushwick is a neighborhood in the northern part of the New York City borough of Brooklyn. It is bound by the neighborhood of Ridgewood, Queens, to the northeast; Williamsburg to the northwest; the cemeteries of Highland Park to the southeast; and Bedford–Stuyvesant to the south and southwest.

The town was first founded by the Dutch as Boswijck during the Dutch colonization of the Americas in the 17th century. In the 19th century, the neighborhood became a community of German immigrants and their descendants. The 20th century saw an influx of Italian immigrants and Italian-Americans up to the 1980s. By the late 20th century, the neighborhood became predominantly Hispanic as another wave of immigrants arrived. Formerly Brooklyn's 18th Ward, the neighborhood was once an independent town and has undergone various territorial changes throughout its history.

Bushwick is part of Brooklyn Community District 4, and its primary ZIP Codes are 11206, 11207, 11221, and 11237. It is patrolled by the 83rd Precinct of the New York City Police Department. Politically it is represented by the New York City Council's 34th and 37th Districts.

== Geography ==
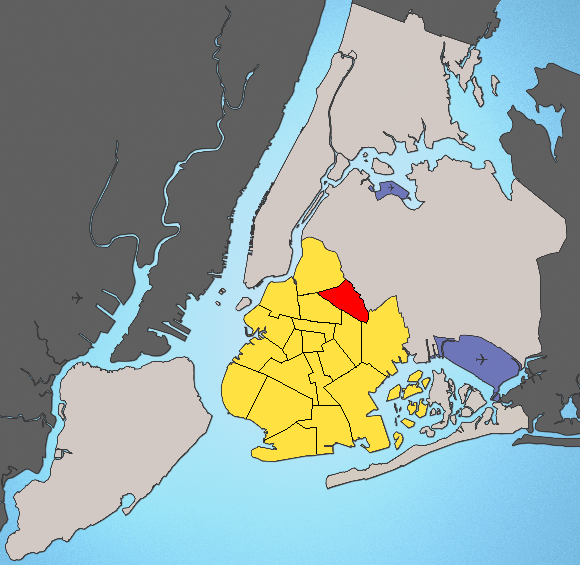
A community district/community board map of Brooklyn, highlighting the location of Bushwick in red

Bushwick's borders largely overlap those of Brooklyn Community Board 4, which is delineated by Flushing Avenue on the north, Broadway on the southwest, the border with Queens to the northeast, and the Cemetery of the Evergreens on the southeast. The industrial area north of Flushing Avenue, east of Bushwick Avenue, and south of Grand Street is commonly considered to be either East Williamsburg or part of Bushwick, occasionally with the modifier "Industrial Bushwick".

The town of Bushwick—which, along with Brooklyn and Bedford, became incorporated as the city of Brooklyn on January 1, 1854—included present-day Williamsburg and Greenpoint. Prior to the merger, in the early 19th century, residential development in the area had begun when the new district of Williamsburg was laid out in western Bushwick. Williamsburg was incorporated in 1827 and officially severed from Bushwick in 1839. Present-day East Williamsburg, which was not part of the city of Williamsburg, was originally organized primarily as Brooklyn's 18th Ward from the annexation of Bushwick. Now part of Brooklyn Community District 1, the area of East Williamsburg is nevertheless considered by some to be part of Bushwick.

For its entry on Bushwick–Ridgewood, the American Institute of Architects' AIA Guide to New York City uses the area bounded by the Cemetery Belt on the south, Bushwick Avenue on the west (save for a short distance between Bushwick Avenue's northern terminus and the Brooklyn–Queens Expressway, where Woodpoint Road and Kingsland Avenue are the western boundaries), the Brooklyn–Queens Expressway on the north, and the Brooklyn–Queens border on the east—thus including the industrial area north of Flushing Avenue and east of Bushwick Avenue.

The centroid, or geographic center, of New York City is located on Stockholm Street in Bushwick, on the block between Wyckoff and St. Nicholas Avenues.

== History ==
=== Bushwick township ===
In 1638, the Dutch West India Company secured a deed from the local Lenape people for the Bushwick area, and Peter Stuyvesant chartered the area in 1661, naming it Boswijck, meaning "neighborhood in the woods" in 17th-century Dutch. Its area included the modern-day communities of Bushwick, Williamsburg, and Greenpoint. Bushwick was the last of the original six Dutch towns of Brooklyn to be established within New Netherland.

The community was settled, though unchartered, on February 16, 1660, on a plot of land between the Bushwick and Newtown Creeks by fourteen French and Huguenot settlers, a Dutch translator named Peter Jan De Witt, and one of the original eleven slaves brought to New Netherland, Franciscus the Negro, who had worked his way to freedom. The group centered their settlement on a church located near today's Bushwick and Metropolitan Avenues. The major thoroughfare was Woodpoint Road, which allowed farmers to bring their goods to the town dock. This original settlement came to be known as Het Dorp by the Dutch, and, later, Bushwick Green by the British. The English would take over the six towns three years later and unite them under Kings County in 1683.

Many of Bushwick's Dutch records were lost after its annexation by Brooklyn in 1854. Contemporary reports differ on the reason: T. W. Field writes that "a nice functionary of the [Brooklyn] City Hall ... contemptuously thrust them into his waste-paper sacks", while Eugene Armbruster claims that the movable bookcase containing the records "was coveted by some municipal officer, who turned its contents upon the floor".

At the turn of the 19th century, Bushwick consisted of four villages: Green Point, Bushwick Shore (later known as Williamsburg), Bushwick Green, and Bushwick Crossroads (at the spot where today's Bushwick Avenue turns southeast at Flushing Avenue).

Bushwick's first major expansion occurred after it annexed the New Lots of Bushwick, a hilly upland originally claimed by Native Americans in the first treaties they signed with European colonists granting the settlers rights to the lowland on the water. After the second war between the natives and the settlers broke out, the natives fled, leaving the area to be divided among the six towns in Kings County. Bushwick had the prime location to absorb its new tract of land in a contiguous fashion. New Bushwick Lane (Evergreen Avenue), a former Native American trail, was a key thoroughfare for accessing this new tract, which was suitable mostly for potato and cabbage agriculture. This area is bounded roughly by Flushing Avenue to the north and Evergreen Cemetery to the south. In the 1850s, the New Lots of Bushwick area began to develop. References to the town of Bowronville, a new neighborhood contained within the area south of Lafayette Avenue and Stanhope Street, began to appear in the 1850s.

The area known as Bushwick Shore was so called for about 140 years. Bushwick residents called Bushwick Shore "the Strand", the Dutch term for "beach". Bushwick Creek, in the north, and Cripplebush, a region of thick, boggy shrubland extending from Wallabout Creek to Newtown Creek, in the south and east, cut Bushwick Shore off from the other villages in Bushwick. Farmers and gardeners from the other Bushwick villages sent their goods to Bushwick Shore to be ferried to New York City for sale at a market located at the present-day Grand Street. Bushwick Shore's favorable location close to New York City led to the creation of several farming developments. Originally a 13-acre (53,000 m^{2}) development within Bushwick Shore, Williamsburgh rapidly expanded during the first half of the 19th century and eventually seceded from Bushwick to form its own independent city in 1852. Both Bushwick and Williamsburgh were annexed to the City of Brooklyn in 1854.

=== Early industry ===
When Bushwick was founded, it was primarily an area for farming food and tobacco. As Brooklyn and New York City grew, factories that manufactured sugar, oil, and chemicals were built. The inventor Peter Cooper built a glue manufacturing plant, his first factory, in Bushwick. Immigrants from western Europe joined the original Dutch settlers. The Bushwick Chemical Works, at Metropolitan Avenue and Grand Street on the English Kills channel, was another early industry among the lime, plaster, and brickworks, coal yards, and other factories that developed along English Kills, which was dredged and made an important commercial waterway.

In October 1867, the American Institute awarded Bushwick Chemical Works the first premium for commercial acids of the greatest purity and strength. The Bushwick Glass Company, later known as Brookfield Glass Company, established itself in 1869, when a local brewer sold it to James Brookfield. It made a variety of bottles and jars, as well as large numbers of glass electrical insulators for telegraph, telephone and power lines.

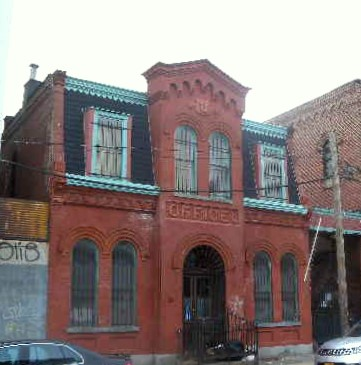
Ulmer Brewery

In the 1840s and 1850s, a majority of the immigrants were German, which became the dominant population. Bushwick established a considerable brewery industry, including "Brewer's Row"—14 breweries operating in a 14-block area—by 1890. Thus, Bushwick was dubbed the "beer capital of the Northeast". The last Bushwick breweries, the Schaefer's and Rheingold Breweries, closed its doors in 1976. As late as the 1980s, there were unsuccessful efforts to revive the Rheingold Brewery. The William Ulmer Brewery at Beaver and Belvidere Streets was given landmark status by the city in 2010, becoming the first brewery with such a status.

As late as 1883, Bushwick maintained open farming land east of Flushing Avenue. A synergy developed between the brewers and the farmers during this period, as the dairy farmers collected spent grain and hops for cow feed. The dairy farmers sold milk and other dairy products to consumers in Brooklyn. Both industries supported blacksmiths, wheelwrights, and feed stores along Flushing Avenue.

=== Railway hub ===
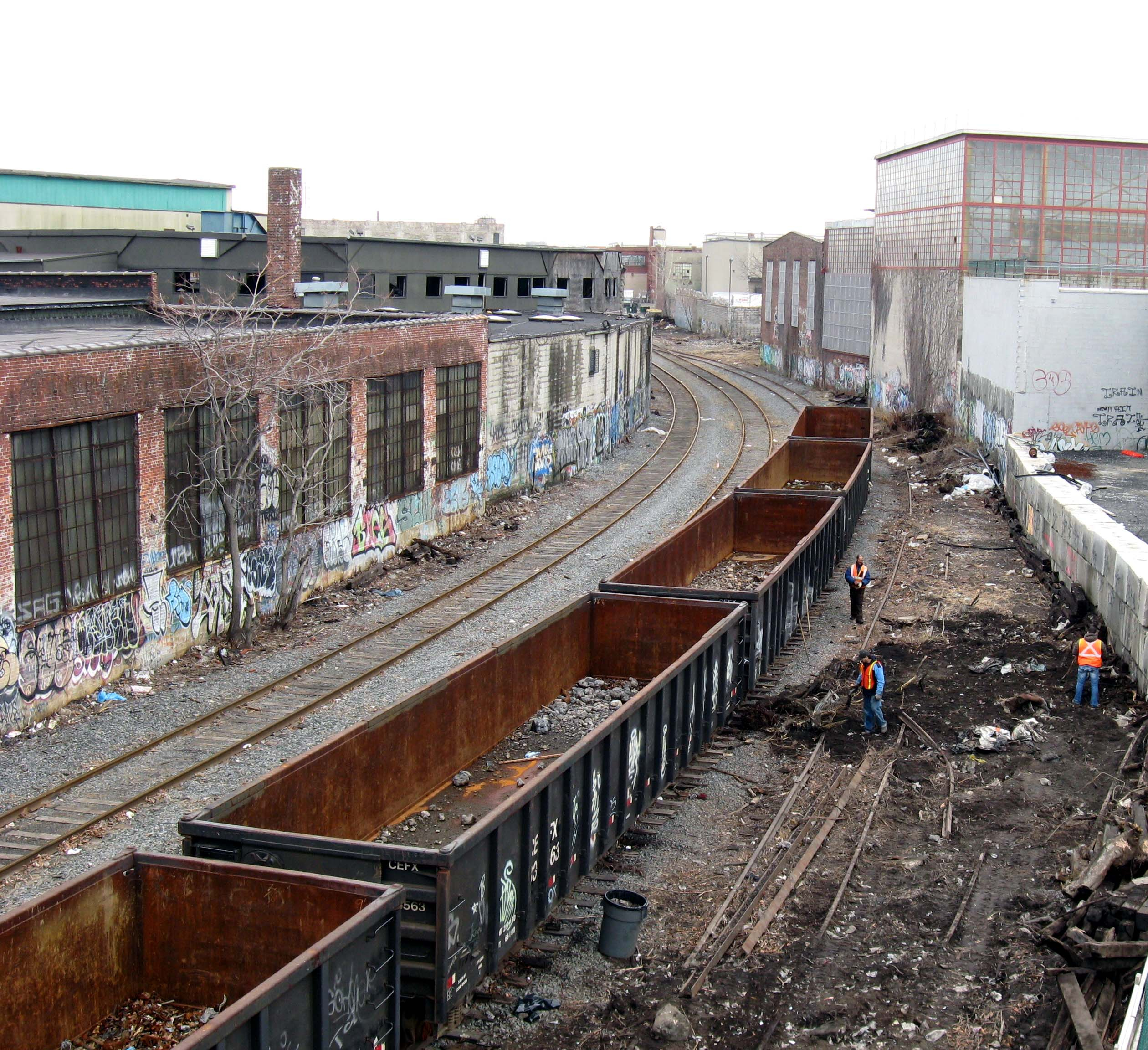
The freight-only Long Island Rail Road Bushwick Branch

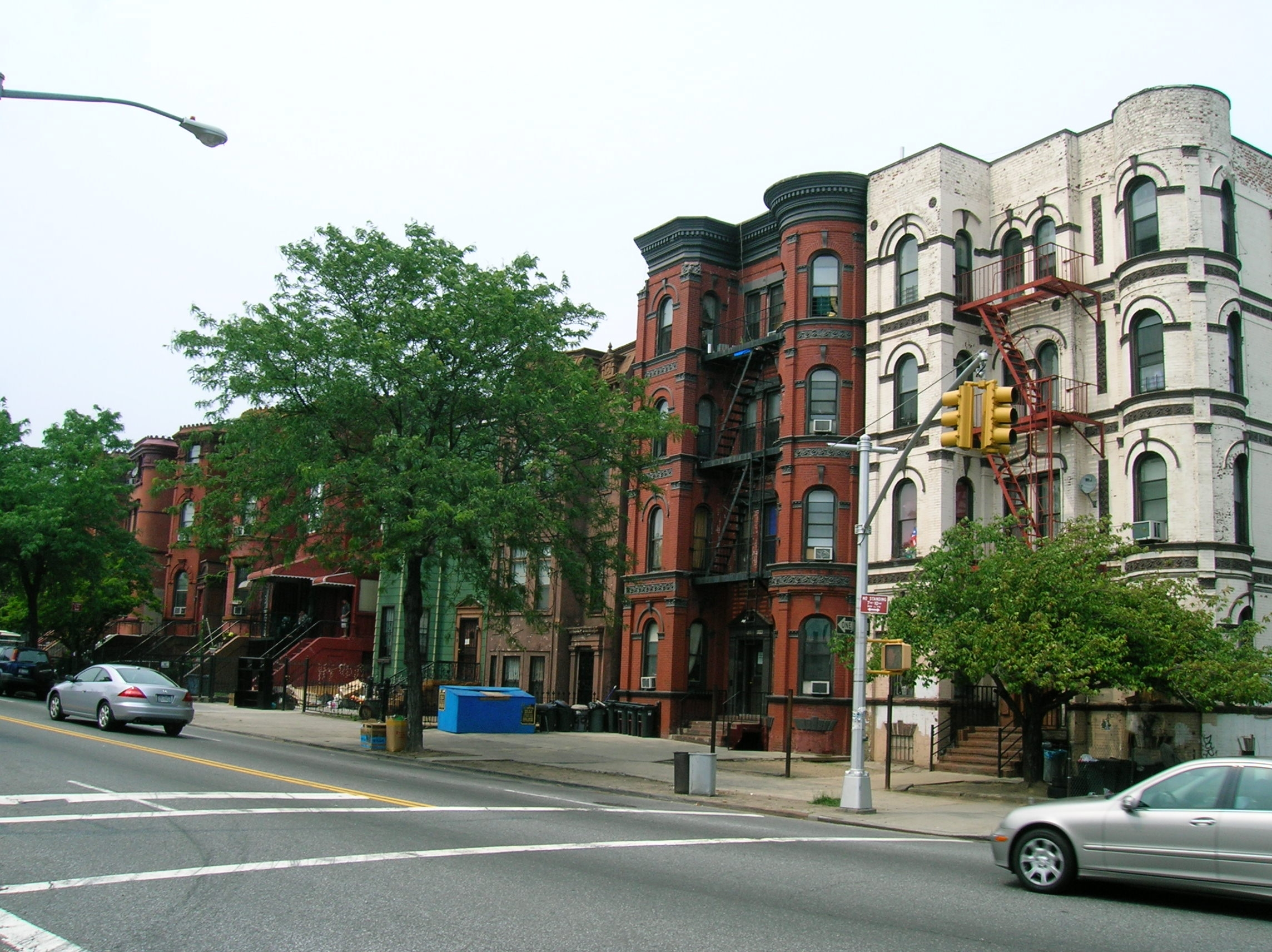
Brownstones and apartment buildings on Bushwick Avenue, near Suydam Street

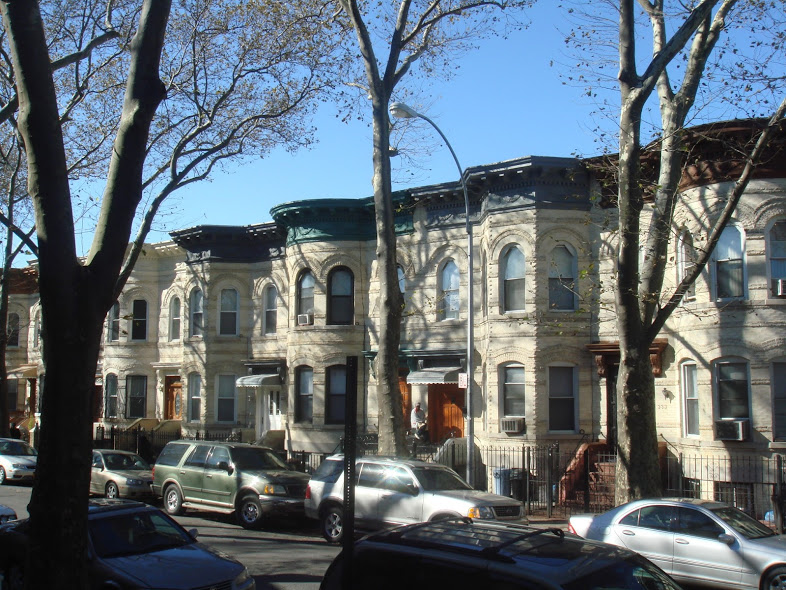
Brick row houses on Weirfield Street, a style that spreads into Ridgewood, Queens

In 1868, the Long Island Rail Road built the Bushwick Branch from its hub in Jamaica via Maspeth to Bushwick Terminal, at the intersection of Montrose and Bushwick avenues, allowing easy movement of passengers, raw materials, and finished goods. Routes also radiated to Flushing, Queens.

The first elevated railway ("el") in Brooklyn, known as the Lexington Avenue Elevated, opened in 1885. Its eastern terminus was at the edge of Bushwick, at Gates Avenue and Broadway. This line was extended southeastward into East New York shortly thereafter. By the end of 1889, the Broadway Elevated and the Myrtle Avenue Elevated were completed, enabling easier access to Downtown Brooklyn and Manhattan and the rapid residential development of Bushwick from farmland.

With the success of the brewing industry and the presence of the els, another wave of European immigrants settled in the neighborhood. Also, parts of Bushwick became affluent. Brewery owners and doctors commissioned mansions along Bushwick and Irving Avenues at the turn of the 20th century. New York mayor John Francis Hylan kept a townhouse on Bushwick Avenue during this period.

Bushwick homes were designed in the Italianate, Neo Greco, Romanesque Revival, and Queen Anne styles by well-known architects. Bushwick was a center of culture, with several Vaudeville-era playhouses, including the Amphion Theatre, the nation's first theatre with electric lighting.

The wealth of the neighborhood peaked between World War I and World War II, even when events such as Prohibition and the Great Depression were taking place. After World War I, the German enclave was steadily replaced by a significant proportion of Italian Americans. By 1950, Bushwick was one of New York City's largest Italian American neighborhoods, although some German Americans remained.

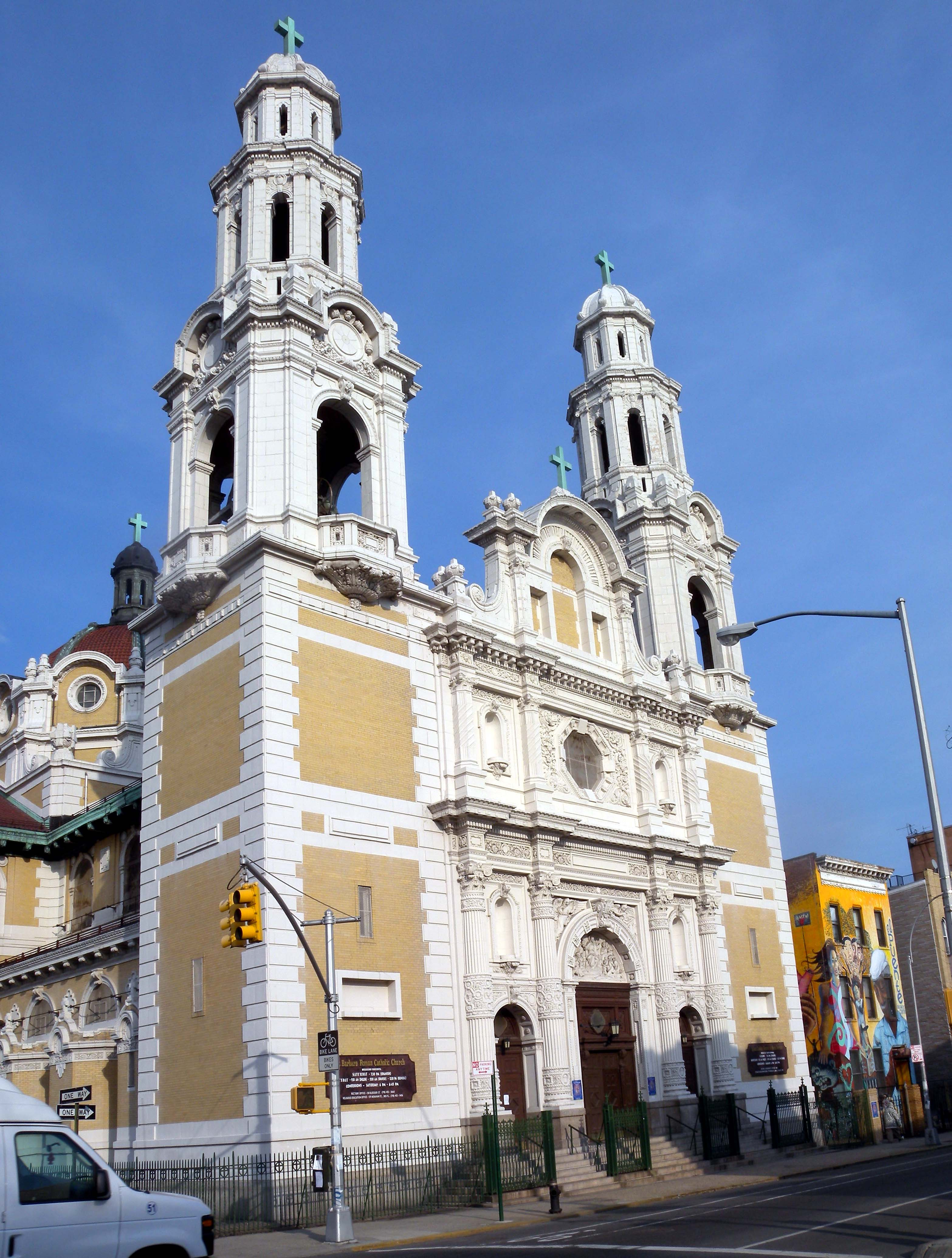
St Barbara's Roman Catholic Church

The Italian community was composed almost entirely of Sicilians, mostly from the Palermo, Trapani, and Agrigento provinces in Sicily. In particular, the Sicilian townsfolk of Menfi, Santa Margherita di Belice, Trapani, Castelvetrano, and many other paesi had their own clubs (clubbu) in the area. Il Circolo di Santa Margherita di Belice, founded in Bushwick, remains the oldest operating Sicilian organization in the United States. These clubs often started as mutual benevolence associations or funeral societies. They transformed along with the needs of their communities from the late 1800s until the 1960s, when many began to fade away.

St. Joseph Patron of the Universal Church Roman Catholic Parish was the hub of the Sicilian community, and held five feasts during the year, complete with processions of saints or Our Lady of Trapani. St. Joseph opened in 1923 because the Italian community had been rapidly growing in Bushwick since 1900. This Sicilian community first was centered in Our Lady of Pompeii parish on Siegel Street in Williamsburgh.

As industry expanded along Flushing Avenue, the Sicilian population expanded with the growing need for labor by factory operators. St. Leonard's parish was the large German Catholic parish in the area, but the Italian community was not welcome there and was thus compelled to open its own parish. St. Leonard's closed in 1973. St. Joseph's is now a large and vibrant Latino parish run by the Scalabrini Order of priests, an Italian missionary order that caters to migrants.

=== Postwar transition and decline ===
The demographic transition of Bushwick after World War II was similar to that of many Brooklyn neighborhoods. The U.S. census records show that the neighborhood's population was almost 90% white in 1960, but dropped to less than 40% white by 1970. During this transition, white-collar workers were being replaced by those migrating from the south. Puerto Ricans, African Americans, among other Caribbean American families, moved into homes in the southeastern edge of the neighborhood, closest to Eastern Parkway. By the mid-1950s, migrants began settling into central Bushwick. The availability of block association housing helped many neighborhoods survive the economic and social distress of the 1970s.

This change in demographics coincided with changes in the local economy. Rising energy costs, advances in transportation and the change to the use of aluminum cans encouraged beer companies to move out of New York City. As breweries in Bushwick closed, the neighborhood's economic base eroded. Discussions of urban renewal took place in the 1960s, but never materialized, resulting in the demolition of many residential buildings with the intent of replacing these structures with public housing, but nothing new was built in its place as these proposals were scrapped. Another contribution to the change in the socioeconomic profile of the neighborhood was the John Lindsay administration's policy of raising available rent for welfare recipients. Since these tenants could now bring higher rents than tenants would on the open market, landlords began filling vacant units with such tenants. By the mid-1970s, half of Bushwick's residents were on public assistance.

According to The New York Times, Bushwick was "a neatly maintained community of wood houses" by the mid-1960s. Within five years, it had become "what often approached a no man's land of abandoned buildings, empty lots, drugs and arson."

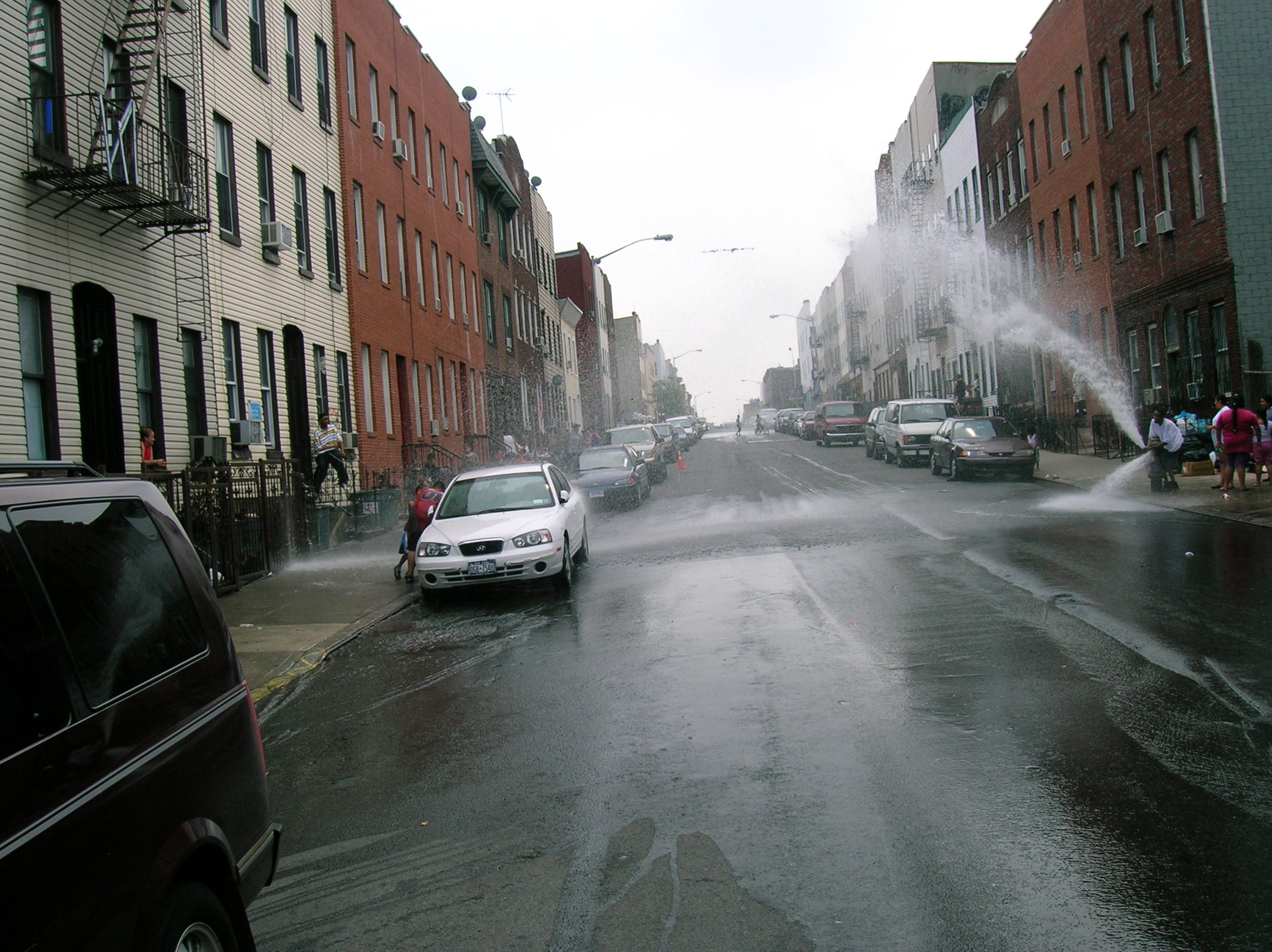
Jefferson Street

On the night of July 13, 1977, a major blackout cut power to nearly all of New York City, and arson, looting, and vandalism occurred in low-income neighborhoods across the city. Bushwick suffered some of the most devastating damage and losses. While store owners along Knickerbocker and Graham avenues were able to defend their stores, the Broadway shopping district was heavily looted and burned.

Newspapers around the country published UPI and the Associated Press's photos of Bushwick residents with stolen items and a police officer beating a suspected looter, and Bushwick became known for riots and looting. Fires spread to many residential buildings as well. After the riots were over and the fires were put out, residents saw unsafe dwellings and empty lots among surviving buildings, leading one author to describe the scene as "some streets that looked like Brooklyn Heights, and others that looked like Dresden in 1945": The business vacancy rate on Broadway reached 43% in the wake of the riots.

The 1977 blackout and resulting riots left Bushwick without a commercial retail hub. Middle-class residents who could afford to leave did so, in some cases abandoning their homes. New immigrants continued to move to the area, many from Hispanic America, but renovation and new construction was outpaced by the demolition of unsafe buildings, forcing overcrowded conditions at first. As buildings came down, the vacant lots made parts of the neighborhood look and feel desolate, resulting in a greater outflow of residents and a growth of the illegal drug trade due to a lack of job opportunities.

Author Jonathan Mahler described the social and economic hardships of Bushwick after the blackout in his book Ladies and Gentlemen, the Bronx is Burning, explaining that the majority of neighborhood residents were living on less than $4,000 a year, and had to rely on some form of public assistance. By the 1980s, the Knickerbocker Avenue shopping district was nicknamed "The Well" for its seemingly unending supply of drugs. Even through the 1990s, it remained a poor and relatively dangerous area, with 77 murders, 80 rapes, and 2,242 robberies in 1990.

=== Gentrification ===
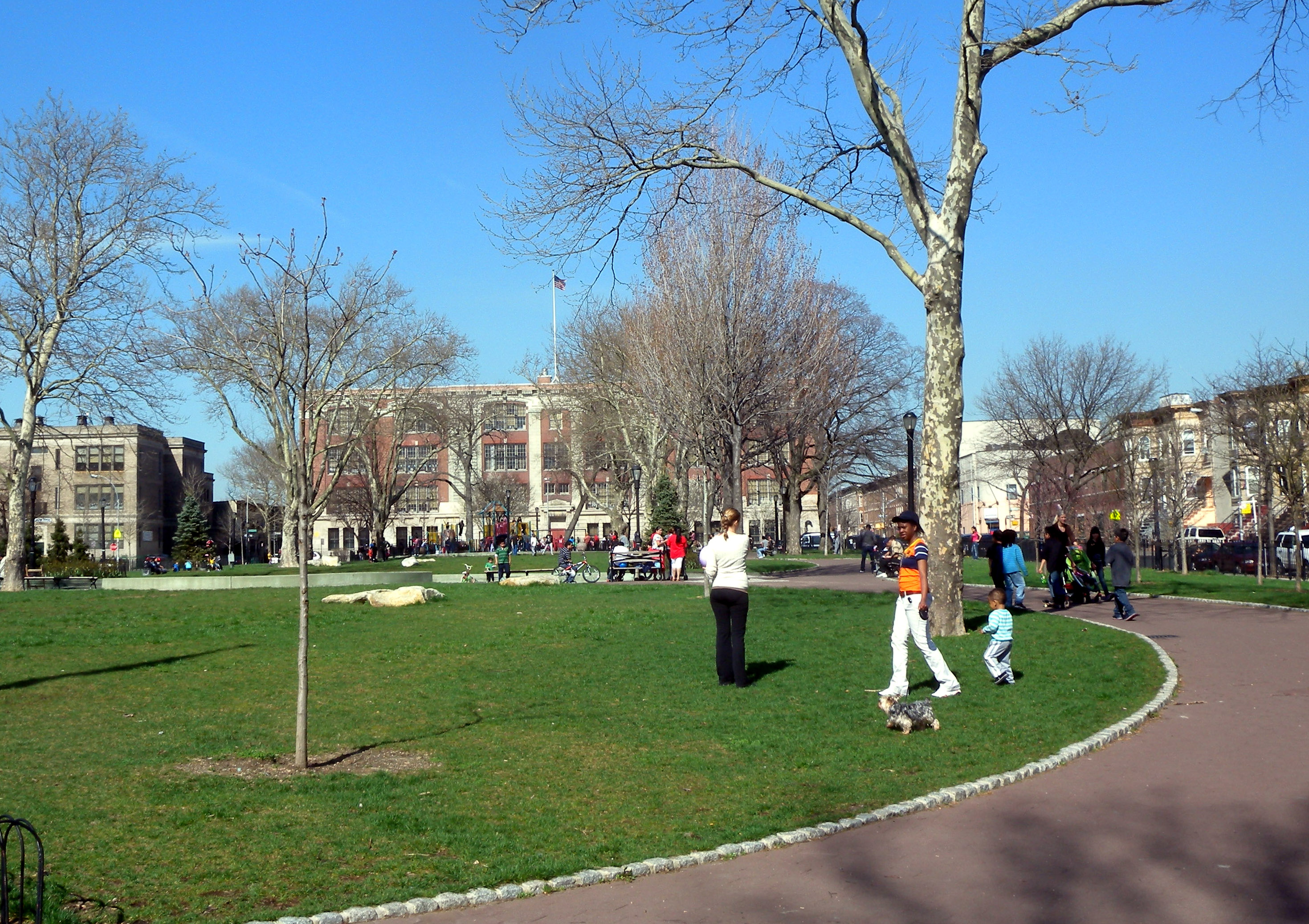
Irving Square Park

Since 2000, the rise of real estate prices in nearby Manhattan has made Bushwick more attractive to younger professionals. In the wake of reduced crime rates citywide and a shortage of affordable housing in nearby neighborhoods such as Park Slope and Williamsburg, numerous young professionals and artists have moved into converted warehouse lofts, brownstones, limestone-brick townhouses, and other renovated buildings in Bushwick.

A flourishing artist community has existed in Bushwick for decades and has become more visible in the neighborhood. Dozens of art studios and galleries are scattered throughout the neighborhood. Several open studios programs are conducted that enable the public to visit artist studios and galleries, and several websites are devoted to promoting neighborhood art and events. Bushwick artists display their works in galleries and private spaces throughout the neighborhood. The borough's first and only trailer park, a 20-person art collective established by founder, Hayden Cummings and ZenoRadio's Baruch Herzfeld, was established within a former nut roasting factory for live/work spaces. A Bushwick-centered news site, entitled Bushwick Daily, was founded in 2010 by Katarina Hybenova, and features community issues, events, food, art and culture.

Starting in the mid-2000s, the city and state governments began the Bushwick Initiative, a two-year pilot program spearheaded by the New York City Department of Housing Preservation and Development (HPD) and various community projects. The group's goal was to improve quality of life in the twenty-three square blocks surrounding Maria Hernandez Park through various programs such as addressing deteriorated housing conditions, increasing economic development opportunities, and reducing drug dealing activities. The group's crime-reduction activities included collaboration with the HPD's Narcotics Control Unit and the New York City Police Department's 83rd Precinct and Narcotics Division to reduce drug-dealing.

To reduce lead hazards in buildings, HPD and DOHMH created a grant program focusing on residential buildings in the initiative's coverage area, which resulted in fines for dozens of landlords with lead paint hazards. The Bushwick Initiative's economic development efforts were also focused on revitalizing the Knickerbocker Avenue commercial district, and adding a thousand rat-resistant public trash cans to reduce litter.

In 2019, the New York City Department of City Planning released a Bushwick rezoning plan covering 300 city blocks. The plan would allow for high-density development on Broadway and Myrtle and Wyckoff Avenues.

== Demographics ==
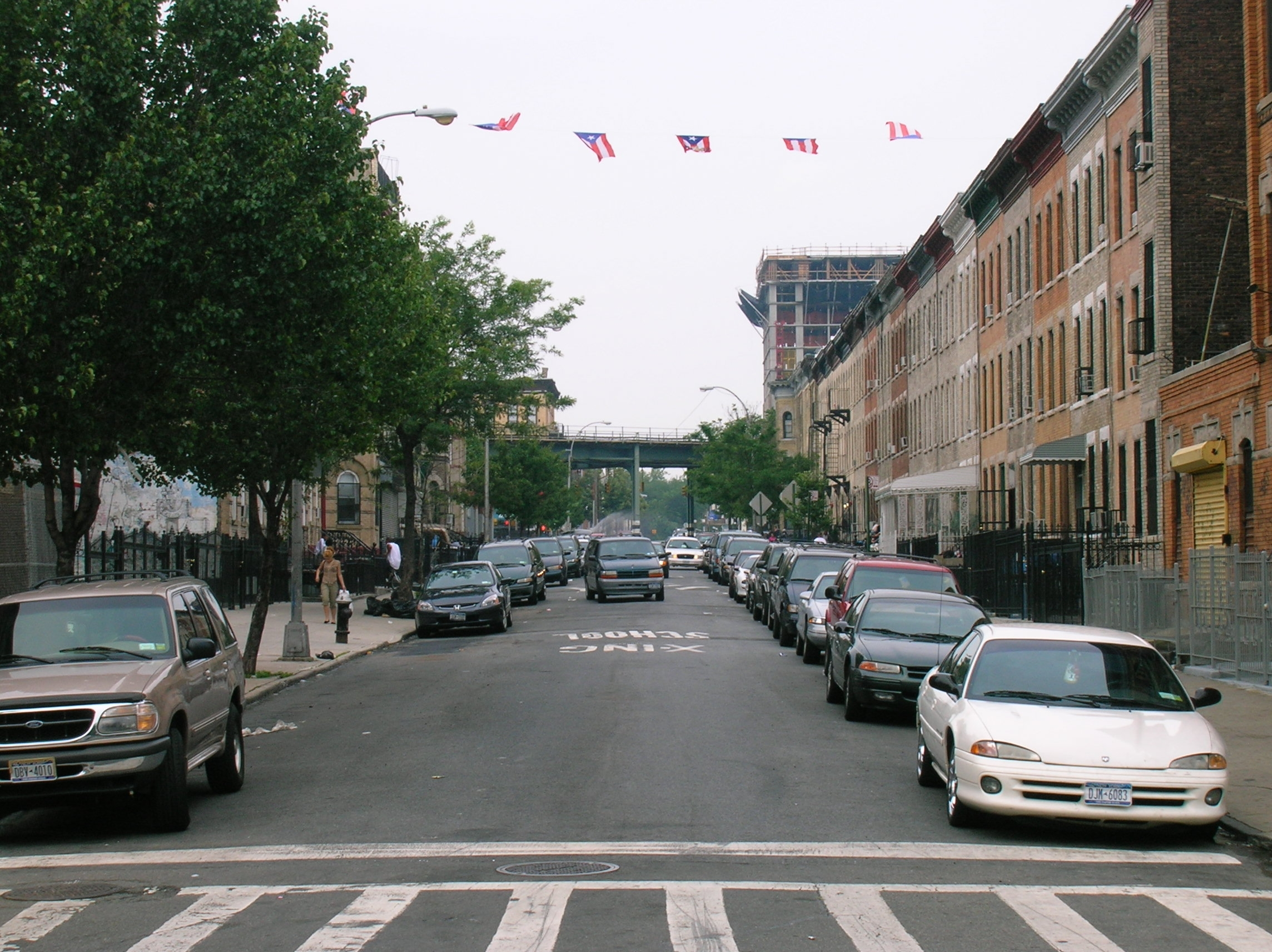
Puerto Rican flags fly above a side street in Bushwick.

The entirety of Community Board 4 had 112,388 inhabitants as of NYC Health's 2018 Community Health Profile, with an average life expectancy of 80.4 years. This is lower than the median life expectancy of 81.2 for all New York City neighborhoods. Most inhabitants are middle-aged adults and youth: 24% are between the ages of 0 and 17, 35% between 25 and 44, and 20% between 45 and 64. The ratio of college-aged and elderly residents was lower, at 12% and 9% respectively.

As of 2016, the median household income in Community Board 4 was $50,656. In 2018, an estimated 25% of Bushwick residents lived in poverty, compared to 21% in all of Brooklyn and 20% in all of New York City. One in eight residents (13%) were unemployed, compared to 9% in the rest of both Brooklyn and New York City. Rent burden, or the percentage of residents who have difficulty paying their rent, is 55% in Bushwick, higher than the citywide and boroughwide rates of 52% and 51% respectively. Based on this calculation, as of 2018, Bushwick is considered to be gentrifying.

Though an ethnic neighborhood, Bushwick's population is, for a New York City neighborhood, relatively heterogeneous, scoring a 0.5 on the Furman Center's racial diversity index, making it the city's 35th most diverse neighborhood in 2007. Many residents are Latino American citizens from the island of Puerto Rico and immigrants from the Dominican Republic. Since the turn of the 21st century, the population of native-born Americans has increased, as have other Latino groups, particularly immigrants from Mexico and El Salvador.

In 2008 the neighborhood's median household income was $28,802. 32% of the population falls under the poverty line, making Bushwick the 7th-most impoverished neighborhood in New York City. More than 75% of children in the neighborhood are born in poverty. Some 40.3% of students in Bushwick read at grade level in 2007, making it the 49th most literate neighborhood in the city that year. 58.2% of students could work math at grade level in Bushwick, and it ranked as 41st in the city.

Bushwick is the most populous Hispanic-American community in Brooklyn, although Sunset Park also has a large Hispanic population. As in other neighborhoods in New York City, Bushwick's Hispanic population is mainly from Puerto Rico and the Dominican Republic. It also has a sizable population from South American nations. As nearly 70% of Bushwick's population is Hispanic, residents have created many businesses to support their various national and distinct traditions in food and other items. The neighborhood's major commercial streets are Knickerbocker Avenue, Myrtle Avenue, Wyckoff Avenue, and Broadway.

=== Neighborhood tabulation areas ===
There are two neighborhood tabulation areas that covered Bushwick as of the 2020 United States census. The total population of these districts was 120,741.

==== Bushwick North ====
Based on data from the 2010 United States census, the population of Bushwick North was 57,138, an increase of 1,045 (1.9%) from the 56,093 counted in 2000. Covering an area of 570.78 acres (230.99 ha), the neighborhood had a population density of 100.1 inhabitants per acre (64,100/sq mi; 24,700/km^{2}).

The ethnic and racial makeup of the neighborhood as of 2010 was 10.7% (6,098) non-Hispanic white, 9.7% (5,533) non-Hispanic black, 0.1% (82) Native American, 6.0% (3,417) Asian, 0.0% (11) Pacific Islander, 0.7% (380) from other races, and 1.0% (582) from two or more races. Hispanic or Latino of any race were 71.8% (41,035) of the population.

==== Bushwick South ====
Based on data from the 2010 United States census, the population of Bushwick South was 72,101, an increase of 7,484 (11.6%) from the 64,617 counted in 2000. Covering an area of 923.64 acres (373.78 ha), the neighborhood had a population density of 78.1 inhabitants per acre (50,000/sq mi; 19,300/km^{2}).

The racial makeup of the neighborhood was 9.5% (6,819) non-Hispanic white, 28.1% (20,281) black, 0.2% (155) Native American, 2.4% (1,734) Asian, 0.0% (21) Pacific Islander, 0.4% (268) from other races, and 1.1% (809) from two or more races. Hispanic or Latino of any race were 58.3% (42,014) of the population.

=== 2020 Census Tabulation ===
In the 2020 census data from New York City Department of City Planning, they split up the tabulations between west and east Bushwick. West Bushwick had between 30,000 and 39,999 Hispanic residents and 10,000 to 19,999 White residents; meanwhile, the Black and Asian populations were each under 5000 residents. East Bushwick had between 30,000 and 39,999 Hispanic residents, 10,000 to 19,999 White residents, and 5,000 to 9,999 Black residents while the Asian residents were less than 5000.

=== Puerto Rican and Dominican communities ===
Bushwick and neighboring East New York are the center for the Hispanic community in Brooklyn. In the post-World War II period, Bushwick was still a predominantly Irish and Italian-American community. Puerto Ricans began to migrate to New York for greater opportunities, developing Hispanic enclaves in Brooklyn, East Harlem, the Lower East Side or Loisaida, and the Bronx. Many Puerto Ricans also settled in neighboring Williamsburg, also known as Los Sures, due to the proximity to jobs at the now defunct Domino Sugar Refinery as well as at the Brooklyn Navy Yard; they expanded into other parts of Brooklyn as many ethnic Irish and some Italians moved to nearby Queens (such as Ridgewood and Middle Village).

Salsa music, corner bodegas, and Latin cuisine are part of the cultural dynamic of the Bushwick community. The neighborhood contains the largest concentration of Hispanic Americans in the entire borough, followed closely behind by Sunset Park. The Williamsburg and Bushwick communities are home to their own local Puerto Rican Day Parade. The parade board usually meets at the Orocovis Social Club, located off Myrtle Avenue. La Isla Restaurant, located off Myrtle Avenue and Knickerbocker, is popular for its Puerto Rican and Dominican cuisine. On the corner of Broadway, Flushing Avenue and Graham Avenue, where Bushwick, Williamsburg and Bedford–Stuyvesant meet, in the shadow of Woodhull Medical Center, Graham Avenue becomes the Avenue of Puerto Rico.

A campus of Boricua College and a branch of the Puerto Rico-based Popular Community Bank are located within the Bushwick area. Make the Road New York, a Latino community group, has a chapter in the neighborhood. So important is the activism of local Latinos that in 2016, Democratic Party presidential candidate Bernie Sanders campaigned in Bushwick in order to reach Hispanic votes. A web show, East Willy B, was created to explore the struggles of the local Latino community.

== Housing ==
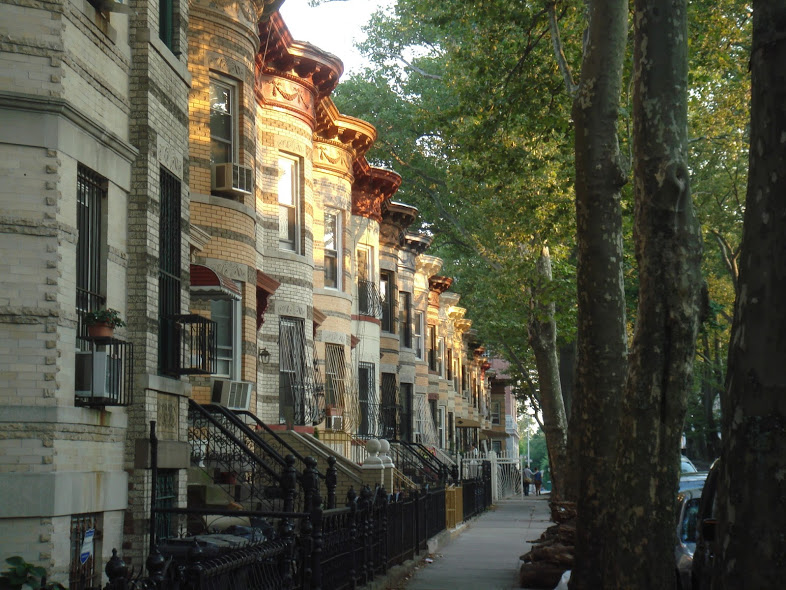
Row houses in alternating cream, yellow, and gray brick, on Weirfield Street

Bushwick's diverse housing stock includes six-family apartment buildings and two- and three-family townhouses. However, three New York City Housing Authority's developments are located in Bushwick for residents of low income, which since July 18, 2019, were all converted into Section 8 RAD PACT Developments in Public–private partnership leases with private real estate developers and companies named Pennrose Properties and Pinnacle City Living including adding a social service provider onsite named Acadia Network.

- Bushwick II CDA (Group E); five three-story buildings
- Hope Gardens; seven four- and one fourteen-story buildings
- Palmetto Gardens; one six-story building

Median rent in 2022 was $2,180 (in 2023 dollars), an 81.7% increase since 2006, adjusting for inflation. In 2023, approximately 3.5% of rental properties were public housing units. The rate of home ownership in Bushwick was 19.6% in 2022, and 1.04% of 1–4 family units were foreclosed on. Between 1990 and 2014, rental costs in Bushwick increased by 44%, the fourth-highest rise in New York City.

== Police and crime ==
The NYPD's 83rd Precinct is located at 480 Knickerbocker Avenue. The 83rd Precinct ranked 52nd safest out of 69 patrol areas for per-capita crime in 2010. The crime rate is lower than in the late 20th century, where there were a high number of drug-related crimes. As of 2018, with a non-fatal assault rate of 72 per 100,000 people, Bushwick's rate of violent crimes per capita is higher than that of the city as a whole. The incarceration rate of 610 per 100,000 people is higher than that of the city as a whole.

The 83rd Precinct has a lower crime rate than in the 1990s, with crimes across all categories having decreased by 80.3% between 1990 and 2018. The precinct reported 8 murders, 24 rapes, 265 robberies, 297 felony assaults, 303 burglaries, 471 grand larcenies, and 92 grand larcenies auto in 2018.

== Fire safety ==
The New York City Fire Department (FDNY) operates several firehouses in the area. These include Engine Company 271/Ladder Company 124/Battalion 28, located at 392 Himrod Street; Engine Company 277/Ladder Company 112, located at 582 Knickerbocker Avenue; Engine Company 218, the "Bushwick Bomberos", located at 650 Hart Street; and Squad 252, located at 617 Central Avenue. In addition, Engine Company 222 is located at 32 Ralph Avenue in Bedford-Stuyvesant, southwest of Bushwick, Engine Company 233/Ladder Company 176/Field Communications Unit 1 is located at 25 Rockaway Avenue in Bedford-Stuyvesant, just southwest of Bushwick, and Engine Company 237 is located at 43 Morgan Avenue in East Williamsburg, just north of Bushwick.

== Health ==
Preterm births in Bushwick are about the same as citywide, though births to teenage mothers are less common. In Bushwick, there were 83 preterm births per 1,000 live births (compared to 87 per 1,000 citywide), and 9.3 births to teenage mothers per 1,000 live births (compared to 19.3 per 1,000 citywide). Bushwick has a high population of residents who are uninsured, or who receive healthcare through Medicaid. In 2018, this population of uninsured residents was estimated to be 18%, which is higher than the citywide rate of 12%.

The concentration of fine particulate matter, the deadliest type of air pollutant, in Bushwick is 0.0081 milligrams per cubic metre (8.1×10^{−9} oz/ft^{3}), higher than the citywide and boroughwide averages. Seventeen percent of Bushwick residents are smokers, which is higher than the city average of 14% of residents being smokers. In Bushwick, 26% of residents are obese, 13% are diabetic, and 26% have high blood pressure—compared to the citywide averages of 24%, 11%, and 28% respectively. In addition, 28% of children are obese, compared to the citywide average of 20%.

Eighty-two percent of residents eat some fruits and vegetables every day, which is slightly lower than the city's average of 87%. In 2018, 71% of residents described their health as "good", "very good", or "excellent", less than the city's average of 78%. For every supermarket in Bushwick, there are 31 bodegas.

The primary hospital in the neighborhood is Wyckoff Heights Medical Center. The Woodhull Medical Center is located in Bedford–Stuyvesant, but also serves Bushwick.

== Post offices and ZIP Codes ==
Bushwick is covered by ZIP Codes 11237 northeast of Wilson Avenue, 11221 southwest of Wilson Avenue, and 11207 southeast of Halsey Street. The United States Postal Service operates three post offices in Bushwick: the Wyckoff Heights Station at 86 Wyckoff Avenue, the Bushwick Station at 1369 Broadway, and the Halsey Station at 805 MacDonough Street.

=== Border with Ridgewood ===
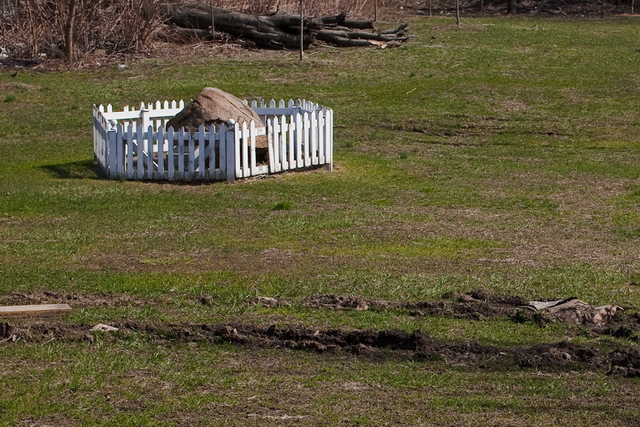
Arbitration Rock, where the county border was set in 1769

Bushwick's land area lies within Kings County (Brooklyn), but shares a political boundary with Queens to the northeast. Previously, the boundary had caused confusion and debate about whether the Queens neighborhood of Ridgewood was also located partly in Brooklyn. The political dispute dates to the 17th century, when Newtown, Queens (now Elmhurst) was under English rule and Boswijck was under Dutch rule. Disputes over the boundary between the two settlements continued until 1769, when a boundary line was drawn through what later became known as the Arbitration Rock.

The street grid plan in Ridgewood and Bushwick was laid out in the late 19th century. Because the Arbitration Rock lay along a diagonal with this grid plan, numerous houses were built on the Brooklyn-Queens boundary, their owners sometimes subject to taxes from both counties. During the 19th century, this resulted in situations where some houses received water and fire protection from what was then the city of Brooklyn, while their neighbors in Queens had to rely on volunteer firefighting squads and paid exorbitant water bills to private utilities in Elmhurst.

In 1925, the political boundary was adapted to the street grid, resulting in a zig-zag pattern. (Note: Traveling south from the Newtown Creek, the border traveled on the following streets: Southeast onto Onderdonk Avenue; Southwest onto Flushing Avenue; Southeast onto Cypress Avenue; Southwest onto Grove Street; Southeast onto St. Nicholas Avenue; Southwest onto Palmetto Street; Southeast onto Wyckoff Avenue; Southwest onto Covert Street; Southeast onto Irving Avenue; The border then entered Most Holy Trinity Cemetery and the Cemetery of the Evergreens.) The change resulted in 2,543 persons' addresses being reassigned from Queens to Brooklyn, and 135 persons' addresses reassigned from Brooklyn to Queens. Modern addresses in the two boroughs can be distinguished by the presence or absence of a hyphen in the house number. Queens's house numbering system uses a hyphen between the closest cross-street (which comes before the hyphen) and the actual address (which comes after the hyphen). Streets in this area that run northeast–southwest, perpendicular to the county line, are demarcated by a jump in numbering sequence between the two boroughs. However, several avenues running northwest–southeast within Queens, parallel to the county line, follow the Brooklyn house numbering system.

=== ZIP Code changes ===
When ZIP Codes were assigned in 1963, all areas whose mail was routed through a Brooklyn post office were given the 112 prefix. The neighboring areas of Glendale and Ridgewood in Queens were given a Brooklyn mailing address, 11227, shared with Bushwick. In addition, part of Bushwick was in ZIP Code 11237. After the 1977 blackout, the communities of Ridgewood and Glendale expressed a desire to disassociate themselves from Bushwick.

Following complaints from residents, Postmaster General William Bolger proposed that the ZIP Codes would be changed if United States Representative Geraldine Ferraro could produce evidence that 70% of residents supported it. After Ferraro's office distributed ballots to residents, 93 percent of the returned ballots voted for the change. The change of the Queens side to ZIP Code 11385 was made effective January 13, 1980. 11237 was reassigned to cover only Bushwick, and 11227 was eliminated.

== Politics ==
Bushwick is part of New York's 7th congressional district, represented by Democrat Nydia Velázquez as of 2013. It is also part of the 18th State Senate district, represented by Democrat Julia Salazar as of 2019, and the 53rd, 54th, 55th, and 56th State Assembly districts, represented respectively by Democrats Maritza Davila, Erik Dilan, Latrice Walker, and Stefani Zinerman as of 2021. Bushwick is located in the New York City Council's 34th and 37th districts, represented respectively by Democrats Jennifer Gutiérrez and Sandy Nurse.

== Community-based organizations ==
- Wellfare
- Coalition for Hispanic Family Services
- RiseBoro Community Partnership Inc
- East Brooklyn Congregations
- Make the Road New York

== Parks and recreation ==
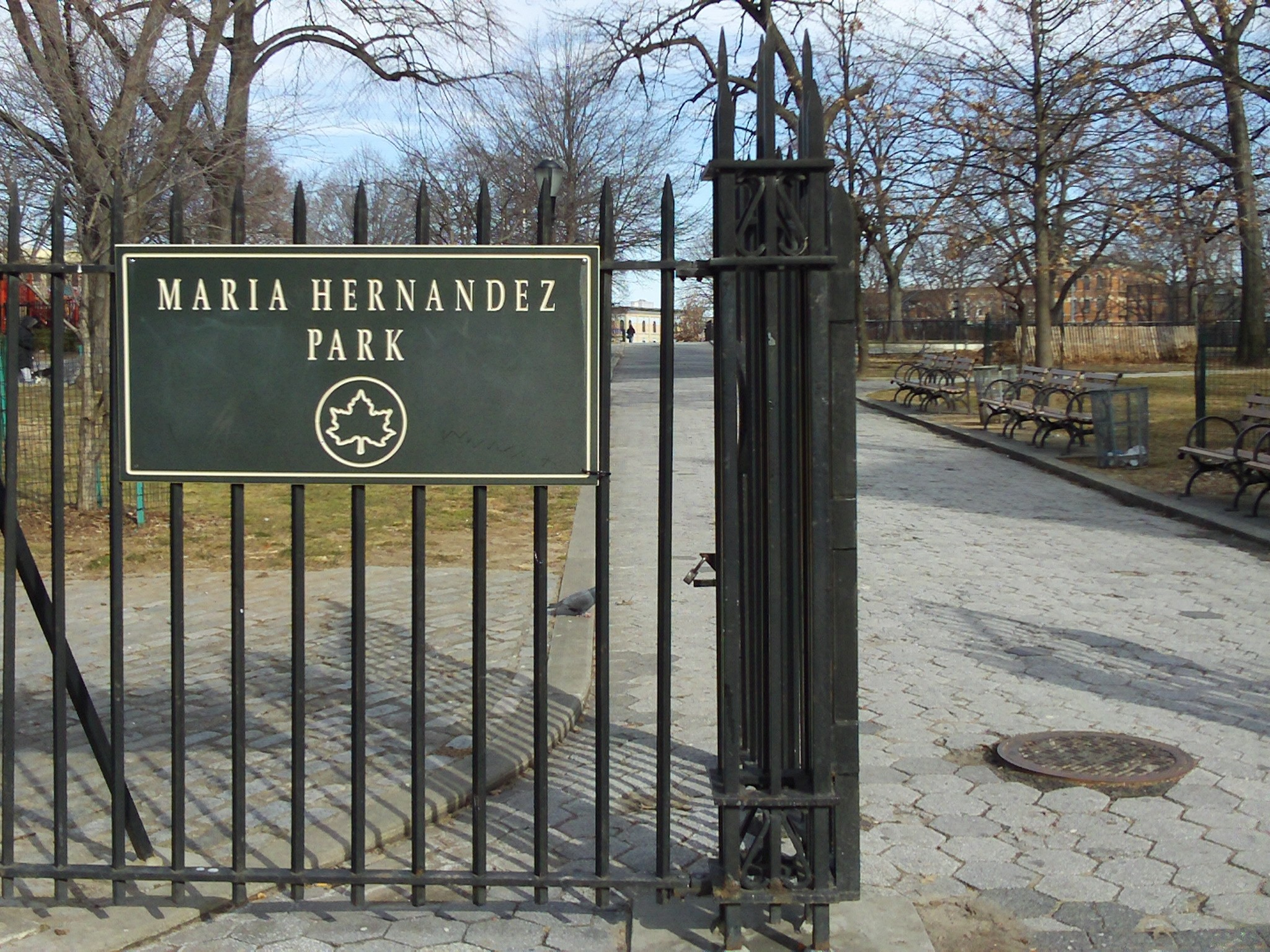
Maria Hernandez Park

All parks are operated by the New York City Department of Parks and Recreation.

- Beaver Noll Park is located on Bushwick Avenue and Beaver Street. Planning started in 2012, and construction was finished in June 2019. It includes seating and a tot lot.
- Bushwick Park and Pool is located on Flushing Avenue between Beaver and Garden Streets, and encompasses 1.29 acres (5,200 m^{2}). The park has a free public pool as well as a children's pool, basketball courts, a handball court, and a children's playground.
- Bushwick Playground is located on Knickerbocker Avenue between Woodbine Street and Putnam Avenue, and encompasses 2.78 acres (11,300 m^{2}). The park features handball courts, spray showers, sitting areas, and a children's playground.
- Green Central Knoll Park is a 2.6 acres (11,000 m^{2}) park located between Flushing and Central Avenues and Knoll and Evergreen Streets. The park is located on the former site of the Rheingold beer brewery. New York City took ownership of the property after the beer company closed due to failure to pay taxes, but it was not given to the New York City Department of Parks and Recreation until 1997. The park includes a baseball field, sitting areas, and a children's playground. A new comfort station was built in 2018–2019.
- Heisser Triangle is located at the intersections of Knickerbocker and Myrtle Avenues and Bleecker Street. The triangle is named after Charles Heisser, a World War I sergeant with the 106th Infantry who was killed in action in France on September 27, 1918. The bronze war memorial at the center of the plot was sculpted by Pietro Montana in 1921.
- Irving Square Park is bound by Wilson and Knickerbocker Avenues and Halsey and Weirfield Streets. It encompasses 2.78 acres (11,300 m^{2}) and is believed to be named after Washington Irving. The park features swings, a sandpit, a spray shower, a handball court, and a basketball court. Since being renovated in 2006 and 2008, the park also features a public plaza and gardening space.
- Maria Hernandez Park is a municipal park; formerly known as Bushwick Park, it is located between Knickerbocker and Irving Avenues and between Starr and Suydam Streets, near the Jefferson Street station on the L train. It has a newly renovated basketball court, a handball court, fitness equipment, spray showers, benches, and a newly built performance stage. The park encompasses 6.87 acres (27,800 m^{2}).

There are also community centers

- Hope Gardens Multi Service Center is a building located on Wilson Avenue and Linden Street that serves as an elderly bingo game building, an after-school program for children from kindergarten to fifth grade, a site for karate classes, and a summer day camp for local children.
- Ridgewood Bushwick Youth Center is a youth activity center located between Gates Avenue and Palmetto Street and run by the Ridgewood Bushwick Senior Citizens Council (RBSCC).

Nightclubs include

- Mood Ring, an astrology-themed LGBTQ-friendly bar
- House of Yes, a nightclub and event space known for aerial acts and go-go dancers
- Elsewhere, a venue for live music and other events

== Education ==
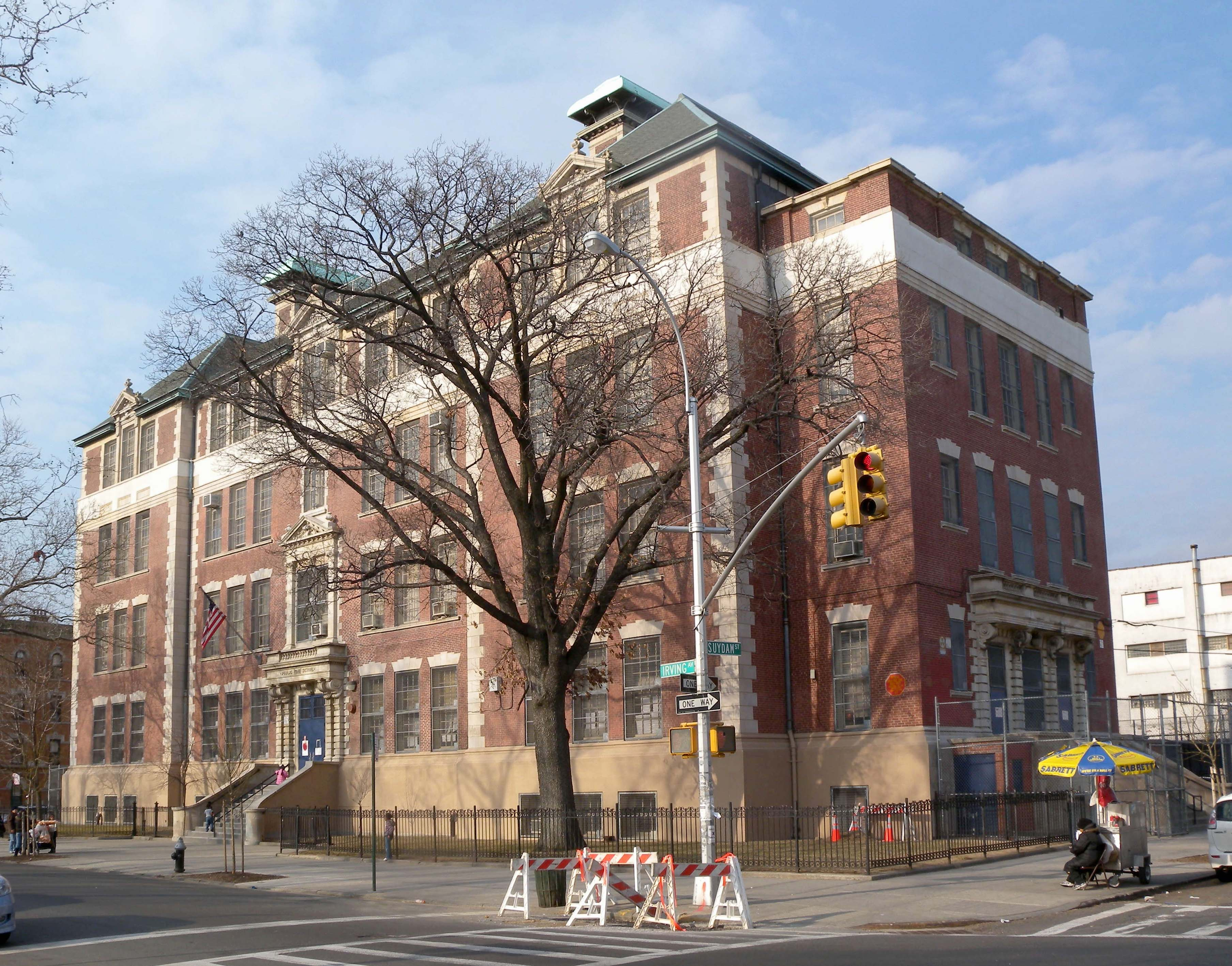
Public School 123, Irving Avenue

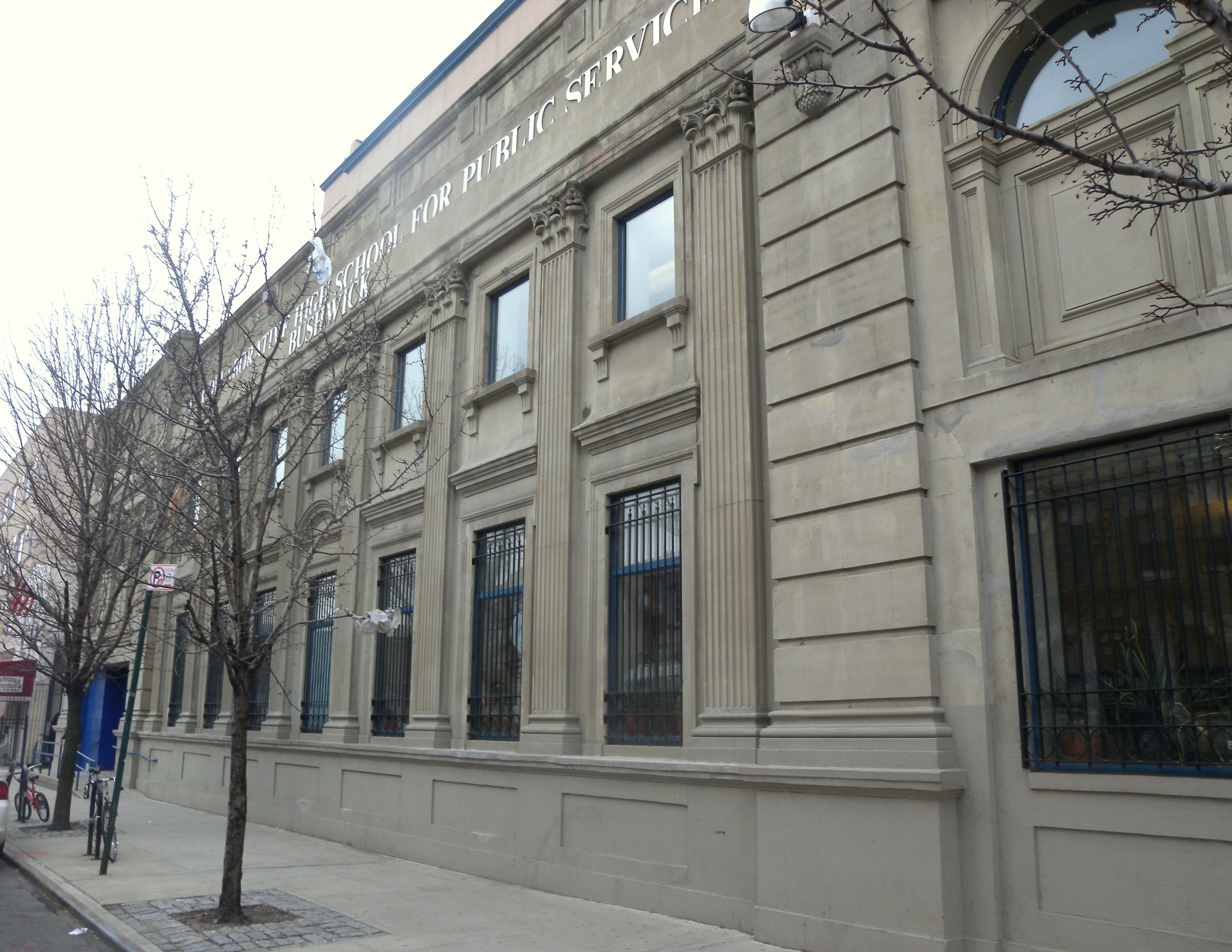
EBC High School for Public Service

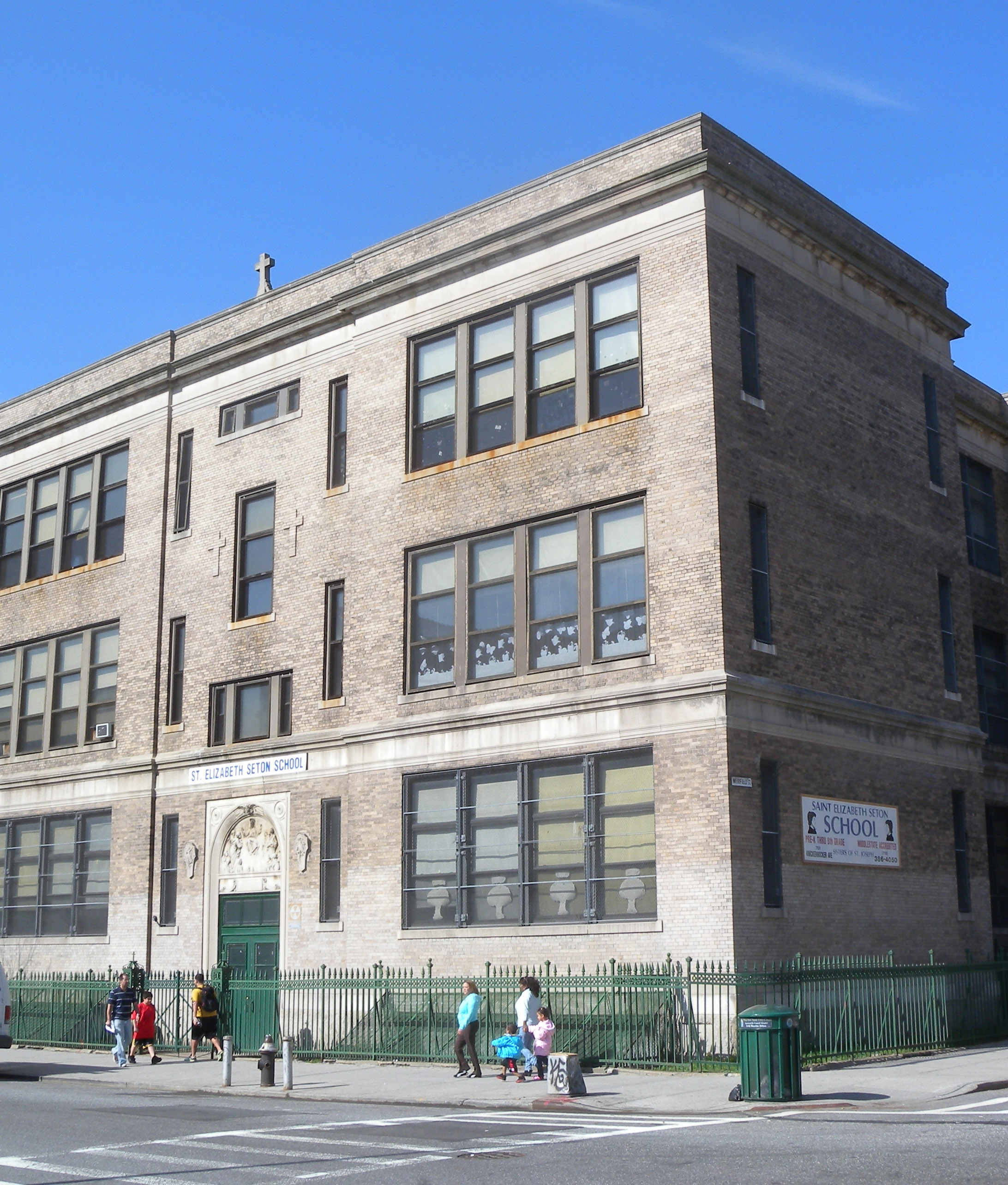
Saint Elizabeth Seton School

Bushwick generally has lower ratios of college-educated residents than the rest of the city as of 2018. Only 29% of residents age 25 and older have a college education or higher, but 35% have less than a high school education and 37% are high school graduates or have some college education. By contrast, 38% of Brooklynites and 41% of city residents have a college education or higher. The percentage of Bushwick students excelling in reading and math has been increasing, with reading achievement rising from 34 percent in 2000 to 35 percent in 2011, and math achievement rising from 27 percent to 47 percent within the same time period.

Bushwick's rate of elementary school student absenteeism is higher than in the rest of New York City. In Bushwick, 22 percent of elementary school students miss twenty or more days per school year, compared to the citywide average of 20% of students. Additionally, 70% of high school students in Bushwick graduate on time, lower than the citywide average of 75% of students.

Bushwick has thirty-three public and private schools. This includes 14 public elementary schools, one charter school, four parochial schools, seven high schools, and one secondary school.

High schools:

- Academy for Environmental Leadership
- Brooklyn Latin School
- Bushwick Campus (formerly Bushwick High School) containing:
  - Academy of Urban Planning
  - Academy for Environmental Leadership
  - The Brooklyn School for Math and Research
  - Bushwick School for Social Justice
- Bushwick Community High School
- Bushwick Leaders' HS for Academic Excellence
- EBC for Public Service-Bushwick
- Grand Street Campus containing:
  - High school for Legal Studies
  - Progress High School
  - High School of Enterprise, Business, & Technology
- MESA Charter High School

Combined middle and high schools:

- All City Leadership Secondary School
- Achievement First University Prep High School

The Roman Catholic Diocese of Brooklyn operates Catholic schools in that borough. St. Brigid-St. Frances Cabrini Catholic Academy was formed from the 2019 merger of the St. Brigid and St. Frances Cabrini schools, with students at St. Brigid. In 2019 it had about 100 students.

=== Libraries ===
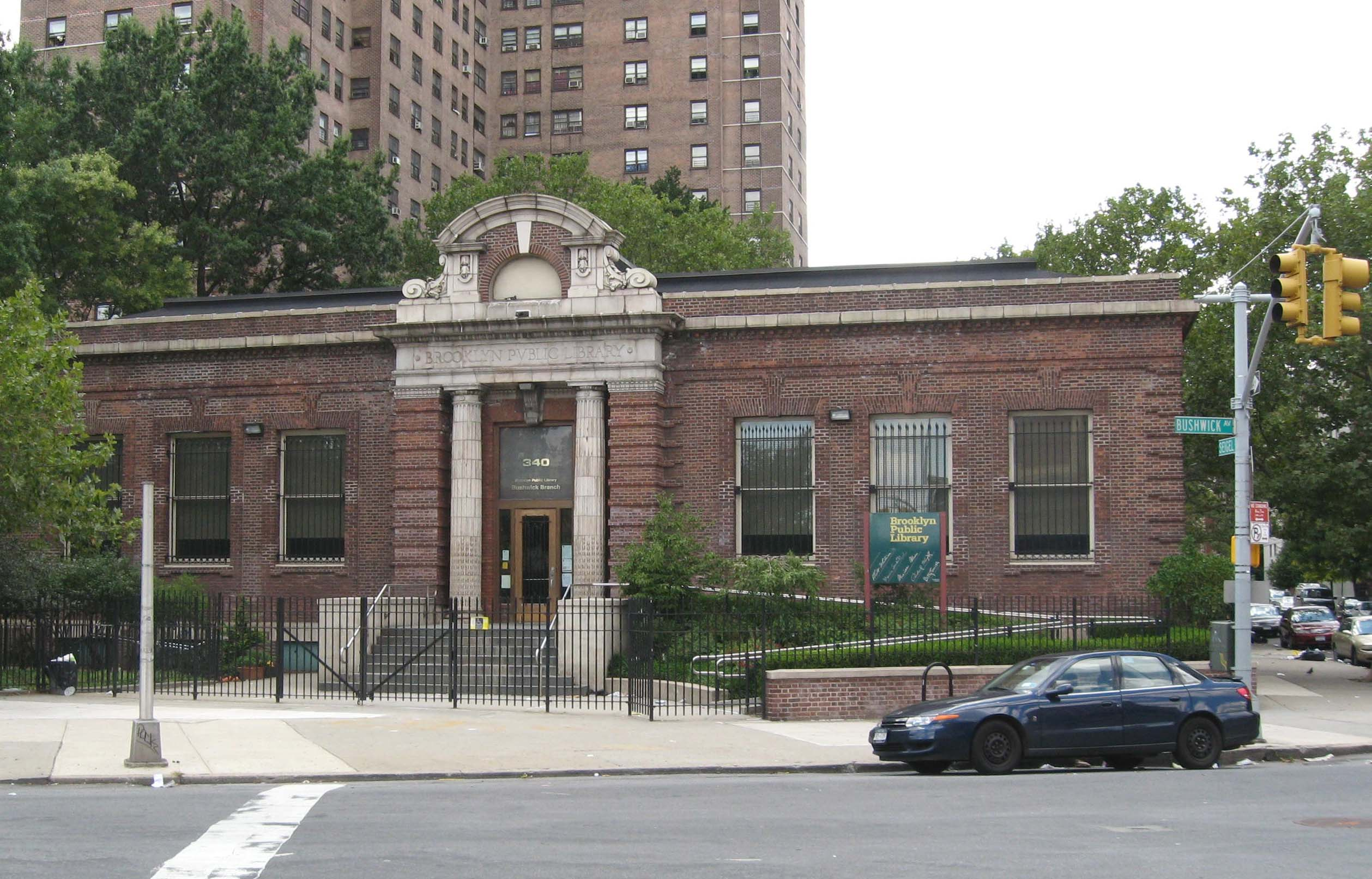
Bushwick branch of the Brooklyn Public Library

The Brooklyn Public Library (BPL) has two branches in Bushwick. The DeKalb branch is located at 790 Bushwick Avenue near DeKalb Avenue. It is a Carnegie library that opened in 1905. The Washington Irving branch, located at 360 Irving Avenue near Woodbine Street, opened in 1923 and was Brooklyn's final Carnegie library.

In addition, the Saratoga branch is located at 8 Thomas S. Boyland Street near Macon Street, just outside Bushwick. The branch is a Carnegie library that opened in 1909. The Bushwick branch, which is actually located in East Williamsburg, is located at 340 Bushwick Avenue near Seigel Street, four blocks of Bushwick's northern border at Flushing Avenue. The Bushwick branch was founded in 1903 and its current building opened in 1908.

== Transportation ==
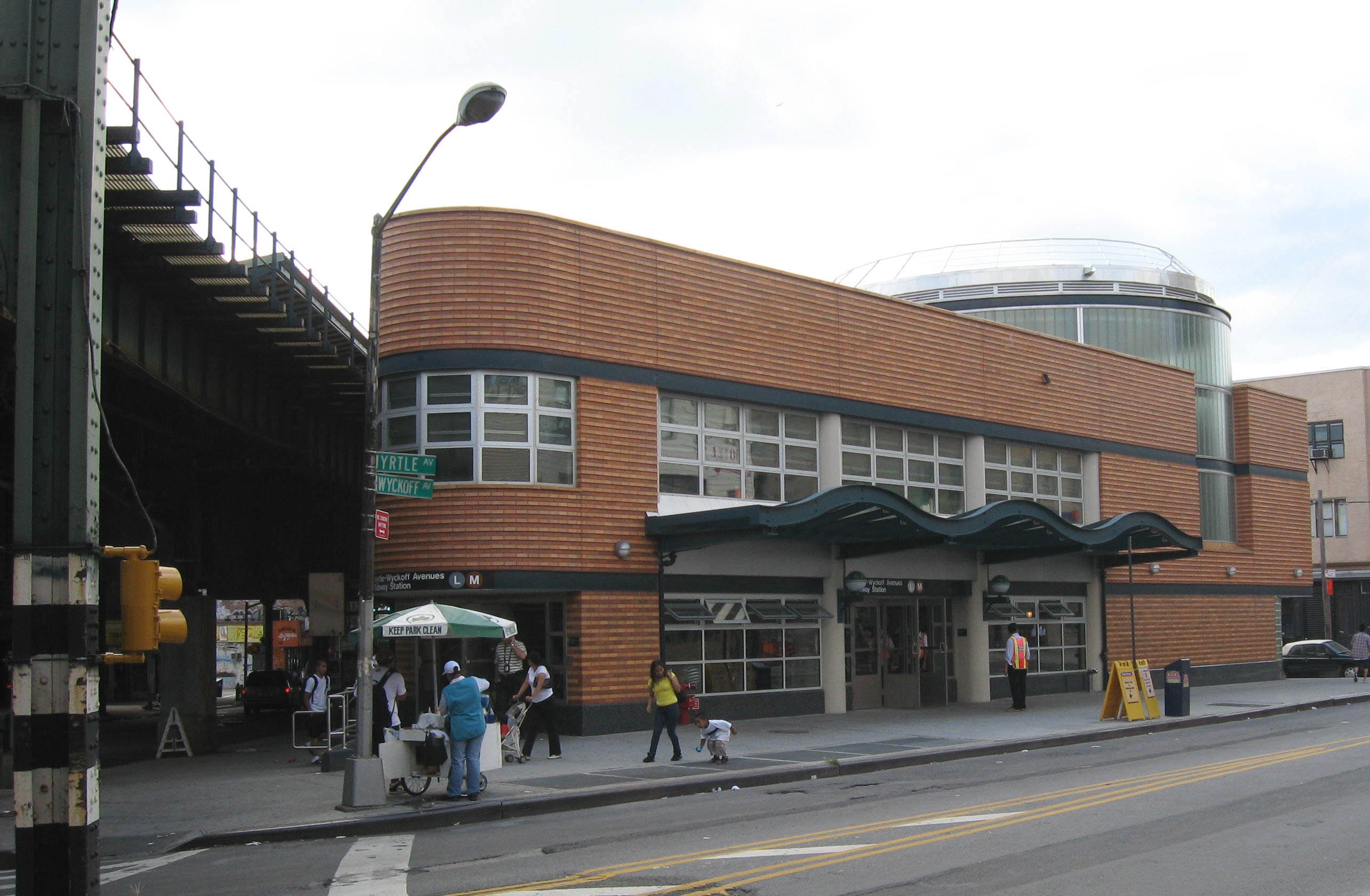
The Myrtle–Wyckoff Avenues subway station

New York City Subway lines running through Bushwick include the BMT Jamaica Line (J and Z trains), the BMT Myrtle Avenue Line (M train), and the BMT Canarsie Line (L train). The Myrtle–Wyckoff Avenues bus and subway hub was renovated into a state-of-the-art transportation center in 2007. New York City Bus lines serving Bushwick include the B13, B15, B20, B26, B38, B46, B47, B52, B54, B57, B60 and Q24.

The Long Island Rail Road's Evergreen Branch used to run from northwest to southeast through Bushwick. The branch opened in 1878, though passenger service on the branch ended in 1896. However, the Evergreen Branch continued to be used as a freight branch until it was abandoned in 1984. Since then, the route of the former railroad branch has been developed, converted to parking lots, or lain vacant.

During the 1960s, under the direction of Robert Moses, there were plans to build an extension of Interstate 78 through Bushwick, to connect lower Manhattan with the South Shore of Long Island. The extension was to be called the Bushwick Expressway, but was never built, due to then Mayor John V. Lindsay's concerns that traffic leaving Manhattan should bypass it via the Verrazzano–Narrows Bridge and the project was formally killed by Governor Nelson Rockefeller in 1971.

In 2010, 68% of residents used public transportation, up from 59% in 2000. Almost all residents (96%) live within 0.5 miles (0.80 km) of the subway.

== Notable people ==
- 6ix9ine (born 1996), rapper who received international attention for his 2017 breakout hit song "Gummo".
- Eric Adams (born 1960), politician and retired police officer who was the 110th Mayor of New York City.
- Eugene Armbruster (1865–1943), New York City photographer, illustrator, writer and historian.
- Jules de Balincourt (born 1972), contemporary artist
- Bushwick Bill (1966–2019), rapper
- William Black (c. 1902 –1983), businessman and philanthropist who founded Chock full o'Nuts
- Andre Charles (born 1968), graffiti artist
- D-Stroy, rapper
- Da Beatminerz, hip hop production team
- Maritza Davila (born 1963), politician who represents the 53rd district in the New York State Assembly.
- Ryan J. Davis (born 1982), theatre director and social media director at Blue State Digital
- Danny Dias (c. 1983–2017), activist and reality television personality
- Ella Emhoff (born 1999), stepdaughter of former Vice President Kamala Harris, dubbed "The First Daughter of Bushwick"
- Camila Falquez (born 1989), portrait photographer
- Jackie Gleason (1916–1987), actor
- Rick Gonzalez (born 1979), actor
- John Francis Hylan (1868–1936), former mayor of New York City
- Williams Jerez (born 1992), pitcher, who played in MLB for the Los Angeles Angels, San Francisco Giants and Pittsburgh Pirates
- Elle King (born 1989), singer.
- Timbo King, rapper
- Charlie Murphy (1959–2017), comedian and actor
- Eddie Murphy (born 1961), comedian and actor
- Harry Nilsson, (1941–1994), singer/songwriter
- O.C., rapper
- Jeannie Ortega (born 1986), singer
- Rosie Perez (born 1964), actress.
- Q-Unique, rapper
- Anthony Ramos, (born 1991), actor and performer from Hamilton
- Phil Rizzuto (1917–2007), baseball player and broadcaster
- Chynna Rogers (1994–2020), rapper, disc jockey, and model.
- Salt (born 1966 as Cheryl James), rapper
- Bernice Silver (1913–2020), puppeteer and activist.
- Jacob Toppin (born 2000), basketball forward in the Israeli Basketball Premier League, formerly in the NBA.
- Obi Toppin (born 1998), power forward for the Indiana Pacers.
- Mae West (1893–1980), actor.
- Dwight York (born 1945), convicted criminal and leader of the Nuwaubian Nation movement
