= Ridgewood Bushwick Senior Citizens Council =

American non-profit organization

- Company type: Non-profit organization
- Founded: 1973
- Headquarters: Bushwick, Brooklyn, US
- Key people: Vito Lopez, Founder James Cameron, CEO Angela Battaglia, Director of Housing
- Revenue: $21,217,906 USD (2009)
- Number of employees: 553 (2009)
- Website: http://www.rbscc.org/rbscc

RiseBoro Community Partnership, formerly known as Ridgewood Bushwick Senior Citizens Council, is a non-profit organization in Bushwick, Brooklyn. Founded in 1973 by Vito Lopez (later to become a New York State Assemblyman), RBSCC offers housing and family services to neighborhoods in Brooklyn and Queens.Ridgewood Bushwick Senior Citizens Council is a non-profit organization in Bushwick, Brooklyn. RBSCC offers housing, youth, healthcare family and senior services to the residents of Bushwick, Williamsburg, Greenpoint, East New York, Ridgewood, Glendale, and surrounding Brooklyn and Queens communities.

== Services Provided ==
RiseBoro is one of New York City’s largest non-profit social service providers, with over thirty years of providing services to residents of Brooklyn and Queens.

In 2009, Riseboro established the Community Empowerment Center to address homelessness and unemployment through innovative programs. The primary services of the Community Empowerment Center include homeless prevention, re-housing from shelter, legal services, veteran’s services, adult education, and job training and placement. They also offer ongoing tenants’ rights and financial literacy trainings for community residents.

Other main components of RiseBoro include youth programs including after school educational programs and summer youth employment; senior center programming, and new development of affordable housing.

In 2015, RiseBoro opened the Coretta Scott-King Senior Houses in East New York, Brooklyn. The new development includes 51 units of affordable housing with onsite supportive services for very low-income senior citizens and their families. In 2016, RiseBoro presented an initial plan on possible rezoning for increased density and affordable housing in Bushwick.

In 2017, given that the organization's services had stretched beyond Ridgewood and Bushwick, the Ridgewood Bushwick Senior Citizens Council changed its name to RiseBoro Community Partnership.

== Investigations ==
Media reports in September 2010 reported that RBSCC was under investigation for political conflicts of interest and financial mismanagement. City and state contracts with RBSCC were put on hold pending the outcome of these investigations.

=== 2010 NYC DOI Probe ===
According to a 2010 report by the New York City Department of Investigation, RBSCC employees at the Hope Gardens Senior Center received City funding for services that were not provided, submitting falsified attendance sheets, contracts, and other fraudulent paperwork to substantiate the claims.

The report outlined inadequate management and oversight by RBSCC, and expressed concern regarding the organization's board.
