= Andre Charles (artist) =

American artist

Zone TCT
- Born: Andre Pierre Charles; 1968 (age 57–58); Brooklyn, New York City
- Movement: Graffiti
- Website: Andre Charles on Instagram

Andre Pierre Charles (born 1968) is an American artist born in Brooklyn, New York and raised in the Bronx. Charles is best known as a 1980s pioneer of the New York City graffiti art movement and for his influence on New York City nightclub and youth culture.

== Biography ==
=== 1980's ===
Charles began tagging on the streets of the Bronx at age 12 and had his own studio on the Grand Concourse (Bronx) at age 18, known as "The Zone". The large studio whose name was based on his alias, "Zone" became a gathering place for young graffiti artists in the mid 1980s. It was from there that Charles would extend his reach from the trains and walls of the Bronx to creating memorial walls for friends and neighbors. These memorial walls caught the attention of the public and the press and soon Charles was being commissioned to do memorial walls all over the city. In addition, Charles came to be known as a reporter of a notable person's death. Often if someone died that Charles had an attachment too, during the night Charles would busily create a memorial wall for them which would often land itself on the cover of a New York daily newspaper that morning. Some of the more notable murals included Tupac Shakur, Princess Diana and Mother Teresa. His talent was recognized early by others in the scene including the artist, Keith Haring, whom he first met in 1982 and was soon collaborating with. Known for his distinctive "Baby" tag, Charles was bombing his "Baby Brandon", usually in the form of a baby image sitting with a pacifier in the Bronx in the early 80's, while Haring was receiving attention for his crawling "Radiant Baby" in lower Manhattan. The image of an infant in their works was not the only similarity, Charles and Haring's treatment of the simple line in each of their works are remarkably similar, which led Charles to re-paint Haring's Pop Shop and many of his murals after Haring's death in 1990.

=== 1990's ===
Charles contributed his art to many of the night club invites being distributed during this time. This expanded into live art shows within the clubs and being involved with the promotion of specific nights, including Saturday nights at the Manhattan club, Red Zone.

While Haring and Andy Warhol's daytime scene centered on an active artist's studio environment and then socializing and clubs in the evening, Charles' early 1990s influence centered on the street scene primarily located outside the clothing store, Unique Clothing Warehouse on lower Broadway, in Washington Square Park and on Eighth Street (Manhattan). By 1992, Charles had firmly established the art crew, T.C.T. (The City's Talent) throughout New York City. At the time, Urban Works, an influential nightclub promotional crew, with an interest in bringing art into the club scene was handling the majority of the nightclub flyer distribution in Manhattan. Charles friendship with Urban Works founder, Joey Sheridan soon led to Urban Works and T.C.T partnering in promoting music and art events that reflected the youth culture of the early 1990s. In 1992, the New York State Democratic Committee contacted Charles and Urban Works to create a voter registration program that focused on youth registration in the streets and clubs of New York City in an effort to attract the youth vote during the first election of Bill Clinton. The campaign involved and employed over 100 young people in registering other youth to vote.

Andre Charles' T.C.T. crew and Joey Sheridan's Urban Works crew had now technically become one entity. With the Clinton campaign behind them, Charles and Urban Works concentrated much of their energy on their Saturday night party at Red Zone which featured DJ's Stretch Armstrong, Funkmaster Flex and Derrik Foxx. The mission to unite many diverse crowds into one party was being marred by escalating violence in the scene and with the closing of Red Zone and the impending closing of Unique Clothing Warehouse, the idea of Urban Works formally becoming an art gallery was taking shape. Before opening a gallery, Charles, Sheridan and John Elegance the "mother" of a mostly straight ballroom house called the House of Elegance began working closely with Harvey Russack who owned "Unique", or as some called it, "Uniques", "Unique Boutique", but officially called Unique Clothing Warehouse . Russack had been under fire from the neighborhood community board and the police precinct for allowing young people to congregate in front of his store. Russack, Charles and the others felt that the young people were being singled out because they were mostly Hispanic and African-American kids from other boroughs. Charles and Urban Works were often partly responsible for the congregation as that is where they would naturally meet flyer distributors that promoted their club events and the area had created a "before the club" meeting place for many, as well. Russack, Charles, Sheridan and Elegance devised a plan to open up the Lafayette Street side of Unique Clothing Warehouse and create a hangout area with a DJ and an orderly area to manage the distribution of nightclub flyers for Urban Works and other promoters. In 1993, Charles and Urban Works opened an office and studio space at 43 Bond Street in the emerging NOHO district of Manhattan. It was blocks away from this location that Charles created his homage to Jean-Michel Basquiat at the corner of Bond Street and Lafayette Street

It was also on Bond Street that a friendship with the model, actress and activist Lauren Hutton began. Hutton noticed Charles work one morning on a gate across from her loft on Bond Street. Intrigued by the art, Hutton came into Urban Works to inquire about meeting the artist. Hutton became an intricate part of the Bond Street studio until it closed in 1997 and moved to Union Square.

Charles output continued throughout the later 1990s and 2000s receiving commissions from Mountain Dew and Lands' End. With the mainstream work, Charles received criticism for "selling out", but Charles defended his choices. In a 2000 interview with Adweek Magazine, Charles was quoted as saying "Detractors say it's selling out, but at the same time, you're breaking boundaries. I want to open doors for other people who are struggling the way I struggled. … I'm going to make the new term 'selling in,' because I'm selling my ideas in that world, just like Warhol."

=== 2000's ===
By 2005, Charles was creating art for Donna Karan for her DKNY clothing line.
