= 2021 New York City borough president elections =

- November 2, 2021
| | Majority party | Minority party |
|---|---|---|
| Party | Democratic | Republican |
| Seats before | 4 | 1 |
| Seats won | 4 | 1 |
| Seat change | Steady | Steady |
| Popular vote | 769,221 (Note: Totals may be combined with that of other parties who cross-endorsed Democratic Party candidates via electoral fusion.) | 277,127 |
| Percentage | 71.11% | 25.62% |
| Swing | ▼6.12% | ▲5.56% |
- Results: Democratic hold Republican hold

The 2021 New York City borough president elections were held on November 2, 2021. Four of the five incumbent borough presidents were unable to run for reelection due to term limits. Only the Queens borough president was eligible to seek re-election after winning a special election in 2020 (and won re-election).

== Overview ==
† - Incumbent term-limited

| Borough | Incumbent president | Party | Elected president | Party |
|---|---|---|---|---|
| Brooklyn | Eric Adams† | Dem | Antonio Reynoso | Dem |
| Manhattan | Gale Brewer† | Dem | Mark Levine | Dem |
| Queens | Donovan Richards | Dem | Donovan Richards | Dem |
| Staten Island | James Oddo† | Rep | Vito Fossella | Rep |
| The Bronx | Rubén Díaz Jr.† | Dem | Vanessa Gibson | Dem |

| Borough | Democratic | | Republican | | Others | | Total | | Result |
| Borough | Votes | % | Votes | % | Votes | % | Votes | % | Result |
|---|---|---|---|---|---|---|---|---|---|
| Manhattan | 223,248 | 84.98% | 34,163 | 13.00% | 5,309 | 2.02% | 262,720 | 100.0% | Democratic hold |
| Brooklyn | 235,118 | 72.84% | 74,068 | 22.94% | 13,617 | 4.22% | 322,803 | 100.0% | Democratic hold |
| Queens | 181,947 | 66.86% | 89,645 | 32.94% | 538 | 0.20% | 272,130 | 100.0% | Democratic hold |
| The Bronx | 94,886 | 79.93% | 15,920 | 13.41% | 7,905 | 6.66% | 118,711 | 100.0% | Democratic hold |
| Staten Island | 34,022 | 32.27% | 63,331 | 60.07% | 8,071 | 7.66% | 105,424 | 100.0% | Republican hold |
| Total | 769,221 | 71.11% | 277,127 | 25.62% | 35,440 | 3.28% | 1,081,788 | 100.0% | |

== 2020 Queens special election ==
2020 Queens borough president special election

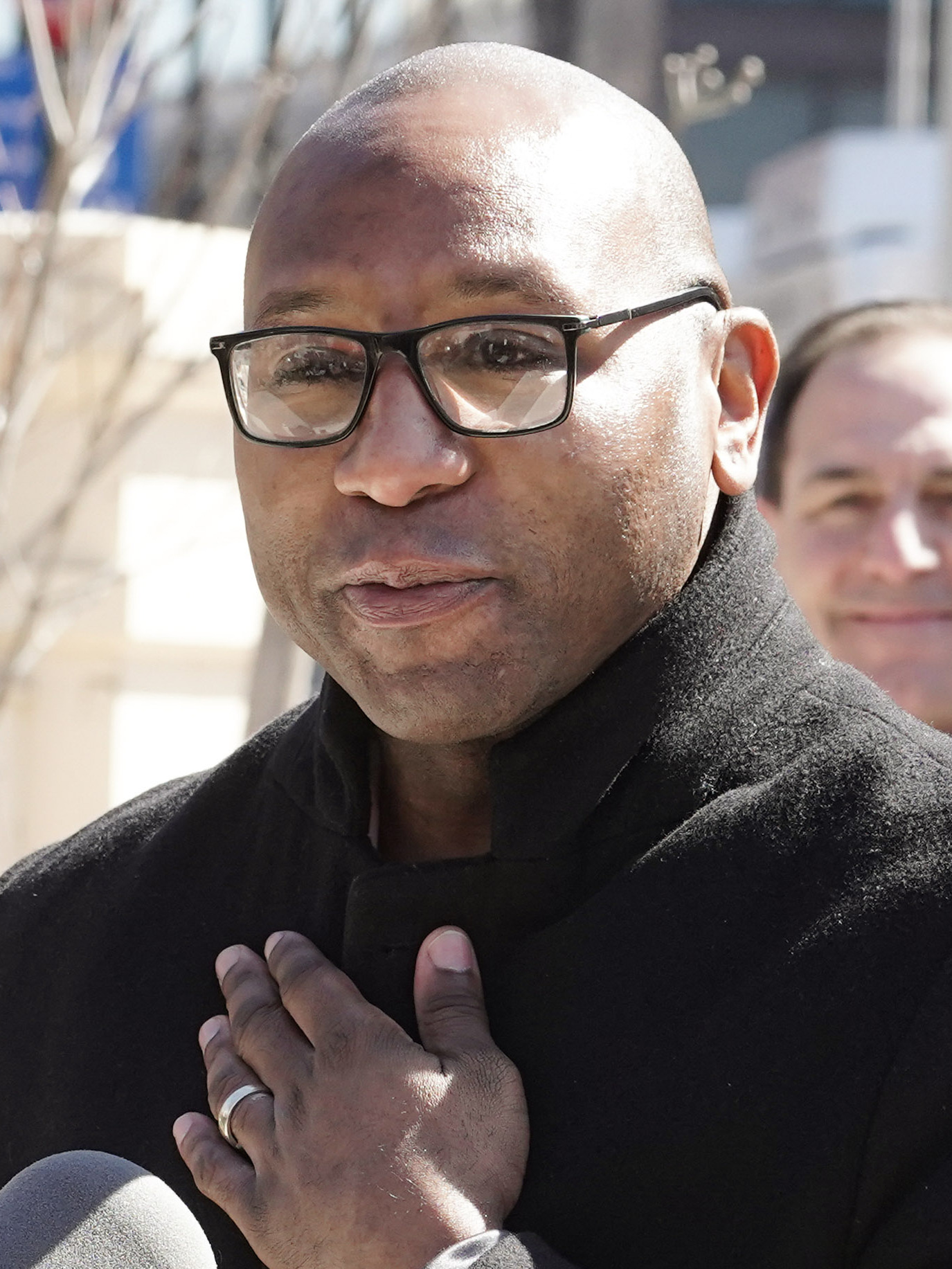

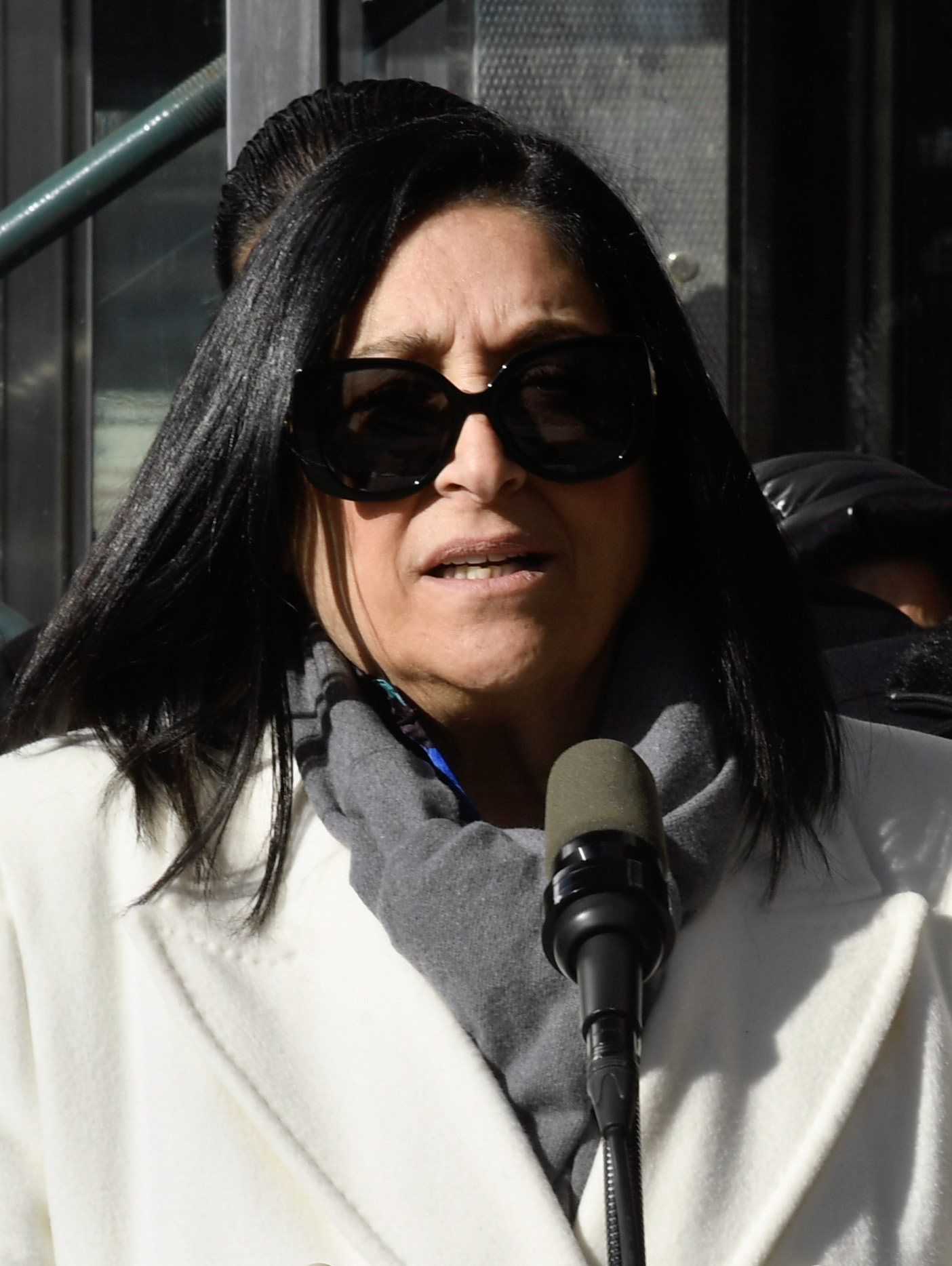
| Nominee | Donovan Richards | Joann Ariola |
| Party | Democratic | Republican |
| Alliance | | Conservative |
| Popular vote | 518,840 | 205,983 |
| Percentage | 66.86% | 27.72% |
- Precinct results Richards: 40–50% 50–60% 60–70% 70–80% 80–90% >90% Ariola: 40–50% 50–60% 60–70% 70–80% 80–90% >90% Tie: 40-50% No votes
President before election
Melinda Katz
Sharon Lee (acting)
Democratic
Elected President
Donovan Richards
Democratic

Incumbent Democrat Melinda Katz resigned to take office as Queens County District Attorney in 2020 and acting borough president Sharon Lee did not run for her term.

=== Democratic primary ===
==== Nominee ====
- Donovan Richards, member of the New York City Council from the 31st district (2013-2020)

==== Eliminated in primary ====
- Costa Constantinides, member of the New York City Council from the 22nd district (2014-2021)
- Elizabeth Crowley, member of the New York City Council from the 30th district (2009-2017)
- Anthony Miranda, former New York City Police Department sergeant
- Dao Yin, businessman

==== Results ====

Richards

20–30%
30–40%
40–50%
50–60%
60–70%
70–80%
80–90%
90–100%

Crowley

20–30%
30–40%
40–50%
50–60%
60–70%
70–80%
80–90%
90–100%

Constantinides

20–30%
30–40%
40–50%
50–60%
60–70%

Miranda

20–30%
30–40%
40–50%
50–60%

Yin

20–30%
30–40%
40–50%

Other

20-30% tie
30-40% tie
40-50% tie
50% tie
No votes

2020 Queens Borough President Democratic primary election results
| Party | Candidate | Votes | % |
|---|---|---|---|
| Democratic | Donovan Richards | 65,123 | 35.78% |
| Democratic | Elizabeth Crowley | 52,509 | 28.85% |
| Democratic | Costa Constantinides | 32,828 | 18.04% |
| Democratic | Anthony Miranda | 22,720 | 12.48% |
| Democratic | Dao Yin | 8,504 | 4.67% |
| Write-in | | 335 | 0.18% |
| Total votes | | 182,019 | 100% |

=== Republican primary ===
==== Nominee ====
- Joann Ariola, chair of the Queens Republican Party

=== Results ===
2020 Queens borough president special election
| Party | Candidate | Votes | % |
|---|---|---|---|
| Democratic | Donovan Richards | 518,840 | 66.86% |
| Republican | Joann Ariola | 182,121 | 24.52% |
| Conservative | Joann Ariola | 16,565 | 2.23% |
| Save Our City | Joann Ariola | 7,207 | 0.98% |
| Total | Joann Ariola | 205,893 | 27.72% |
| Red Dragon | Dao Yin | 17,227 | 2.32% |
| Write-in | | 820 | 0.11% |
| Total votes | | 742,830 | 100.0% |
| Democratic hold | | | |

== Manhattan ==
2021 Manhattan borough president election

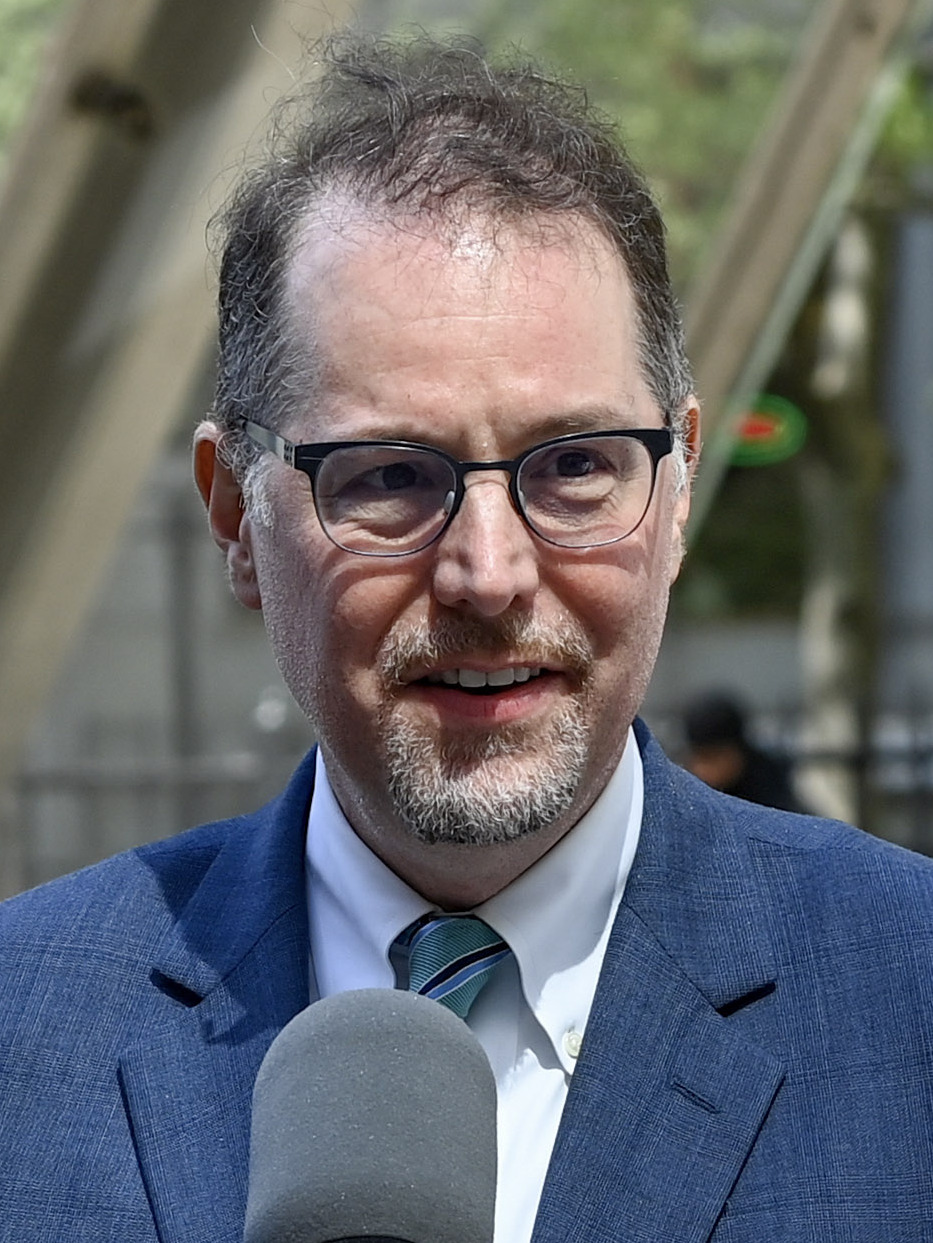

| Nominee | Mark Levine | Lou Puliafito |
| Party | Democratic | Republican |
| Popular vote | 223,248 | 34,163 |
| Percentage | 85.0% | 13.0% |
- Precinct results Levine: 50–60% 60–70% 70–80% 80–90% >90% Tie: 50% No votes
President before election
Gale Brewer
Democratic
Elected President
Mark Levine
Democratic

Incumbent Democrat Gale Brewer was term-limited and could not run for a third consecutive term.

=== Democratic primary ===
==== Declared ====
- Lindsey Boylan, former deputy secretary for economic development and special advisor to the governor, candidate for New York's 10th congressional district in 2020
- Elizabeth R. Caputo, former chair of Manhattan's Community Board 7
- Brad Hoylman, state senator for the 27th district
- Ben Kallos, councilmember
- Mark Levine, councilmember
- Guillermo Perez, candidate for New York State Assembly District 71 in 2018
- Kimberly R. Watkins, president of Community Education Council

==== Declined ====
- Ydanis Rodriguez, councilmember

==== Withdrew ====
- Thomas Lopez-Pierre, candidate for New York City Council District 7 in 2017

==== Endorsements ====
Brad Hoylman

Federal legislators

- Jerry Nadler, U.S. representative from New York's 10th congressional district (1992–present)

State legislators

- Yuh-Line Niou, assemblymember
- Jessica Ramos, state senator for the 13th district
- Julia Salazar, state senator for the 18th district

Individuals

- C. Virginia Fields, founder of National Black Commission on Health, former Manhattan Borough President (1998–2005)
- David Paterson, former governor of New York
- Zephyr Teachout, professor, former candidate for governor of New York in 2014 and attorney general of New York in 2018 (first choice)
- Keith L. T. Wright, former assemblymember for the 70th district, chair of the New York State Democratic Committee

Labor unions

- Retail, Wholesale and Department Store Union
- United Federation of Teachers

Organizations

- Citizens Union (first choice)
- Jim Owles Liberal Democratic Club
- LGBTQ Victory Fund
Ben Kallos

Federal legislators

- Carolyn Maloney, U.S. representative from New York's 12th congressional district

Organizations

- American Institute of Architects New York

Labor unions

- Amalgamated Transit Union Local 1181
- Communications Workers of America Local 1101, 1102, 1106, and 1109
- International Association of Heat and Frost Insulators and Allied Workers Local 12
- International Union of Operating Engineers Local 14, 15, 30, 94, 211, and 891
Mark Levine

Federal legislators

- Adriano Espaillat, U.S. representative from New York's 7th congressional district
- Nydia Velázquez, U.S. representative from New York's 13th congressional district

State legislators

- Catalina Cruz, state assemblymember for the 39th district

Local officials

- Diana Ayala, councilmember from the 35th district
- Scott Stringer, New York City Comptroller

Individuals

- Melissa Mark-Viverito, former Speaker of the New York City Council
- Charles Rangel, former U.S. representative from New York's 13th congressional district

Labor unions

- Communications Workers of America Local 1180
- District Council 37
- Hotel Trades Council
- New York City Central Labor Council
- New York State Nurses Association
- Professional Staff Congress
- SEIU 32BJ
- Transport Workers Union Local 100
- Workers United, New York New Jersey Regional Joint Board

Organizations

- 314 Action
- American Institute of Architects New York
- Citizen Action New York
- Citizens Union (second choice)
- Emgage Action
- New York League of Conservation Voters
- Planned Parenthood of Greater New York Votes PAC
Kim Watkins

Individuals

- Zephyr Teachout, professor, former candidate for governor of New York in 2014 and attorney general of New York in 2018 (second choice)

==== Polling ====
===== First-past-the-post polls =====
| Poll source | Date(s) administered | Sample size (Note: Key: A – all adults RV – registered voters LV – likely voters V – unclear) | Margin of error | Lindsey Boylan | Elizabeth Caputo | Brad Hoylman | Benjamin Kallos | Mark Levine | Kimberly Watkins | Undecided |
|---|---|---|---|---|---|---|---|---|---|---|
| Data for Progress (D) | Jun 18–20, 2021 | 451 (LV) | ± 5.0% | 7% | 6% | 22% | 14% | 26% | 2% | 22% |

==== Results ====

Levine

20–30%
30–40%
40–50%
50–60%
60–70%
70–80%
80–90%
90–100%

Hoylman

20–30%
30–40%
40–50%
50–60%
60–70%
70–80%
90–100%

Caputo

90–100%

Kallos

20–30%
30–40%
40–50%
50–60%
60–70%

Boylan

20–30%
30–40%
90–100%

Perez

10–20%
20–30%
30–40%
40–50%

Watkins

20–30%
30–40%

Other

10–30% tie
30–40% tie
50% tie
No votes

Levine

20–30%
30–40%
40–50%
50–60%
60–70%
70–80%
80–90%
90–100%

Hoylman

20–30%
30–40%
40–50%
50–60%
60–70%
70–80%
90–100%

Caputo

90–100%

Kallos

20–30%
30–40%
40–50%
50–60%
60–70%

Boylan

20–30%
30–40%
90–100%

Perez

10–20%
20–30%
30–40%
40–50%

Watkins

20–30%
30–40%

Other

10–30% tie
30–40% tie
50% tie
No votes

Levine

20–30%
30–40%
40–50%
50–60%
60–70%
70–80%
80–90%
90–100%

Hoylman

20–30%
30–40%
40–50%
50–60%
60–70%
70–80%
90–100%

Caputo

90–100%

Kallos

20–30%
30–40%
40–50%
50–60%
60–70%

Boylan

20–30%
30–40%
90–100%

Perez

20–30%
30–40%
40–50%

Other

20–30% tie
30–40% tie
50% tie
No votes

Levine

20–30%
30–40%
40–50%
50–60%
60–70%
70–80%
80–90%
90–100%

Hoylman

20–30%
30–40%
40–50%
50–60%
60–70%
70–80%
90–100%

Caputo

20–30%
90–100%

Kallos

20–30%
30–40%
40–50%
50–60%
60–70%

Boylan

20–30%
30–40%
90–100%

Other

20–30% tie
30–40% tie
40–50% tie
50% tie
No votes

Levine

20–30%
30–40%
40–50%
50–60%
60–70%
70–80%
80–90%
90–100%

Hoylman

20–30%
30–40%
40–50%
50–60%
60–70%
70–80%
90–100%

Caputo

20–30%
30–40%
40–50%
90–100%

Kallos

20–30%
30–40%
40–50%
50–60%
60–70%

Other

20–30% tie
30–40% tie
40–50% tie
50% tie
No votes

Levine

30–40%
40–50%
50–60%
60–70%
70–80%
80–90%
90–100%

Hoylman

30–40%
40–50%
50–60%
60–70%
70–80%
80–90%
90–100%

Caputo

30–40%
40–50%
60–70%
90–100%

Other

30–40% tie
40–50% tie
50% tie
No votes

Levine

50–60%
60–70%
70–80%
80–90%
90–100%

Hoylman

50–60%
60–70%
70–80%
80–90%
90–100%

Other

50% tie
No votes

2021 Manhattan Borough President Democratic primary results
| Party | Candidate | Maximum round | Maximum votes | Share in maximum round | Maximum votes First round votes Transfer votes |
|---|---|---|---|---|---|
| Democratic | Mark Levine | 7 | 100,718 | 53.8% | |
| Democratic | Brad Hoylman | 7 | 86,660 | 45.1% | |
| Democratic | Elizabeth Caputo | 6 | 42,446 | 20.4% | |
| Democratic | Ben Kallos | 5 | 35,837 | 16.3% | |
| Democratic | Lindsey Boylan | 4 | 28,314 | 12.5% | |
| Democratic | Guillermo Perez | 3 | 17,767 | 7.6% | |
| Democratic | Kim Watkins | 2 | 13,014 | 5.5% | |
| Write-in | | 1 | 550 | 0.2% | |

=== Republican primary ===
==== Declared ====
- Lou Puliafito, Republican candidate for New York's 76th State Assembly district in 2020 and Reform candidate in 2018

==== Endorsements ====
Lou Puliafito

Organizations

- New York Young Republican Club

=== Libertarian Party ===
==== Declared ====
- Michael Lewyn, law professor at Touro Law Center

=== General election ===
==== Results ====
2021 Manhattan borough president election
| Party | Candidate | Votes | % | ±% |
|---|---|---|---|---|
| Democratic | Mark Levine | 223,248 | 84.98% | +1.83% |
| Republican | Lou Puliafito | 34,163 | 13.00% | +1.00% |
| Libertarian | Michael Lewyn | 4,874 | 1.85% | +0.02% |
| Write-in | | 435 | 0.17% | |
| Total votes | | 262,720 | 100.0% | |
| Democratic hold | | | | |

== Brooklyn ==
2021 Brooklyn borough president election

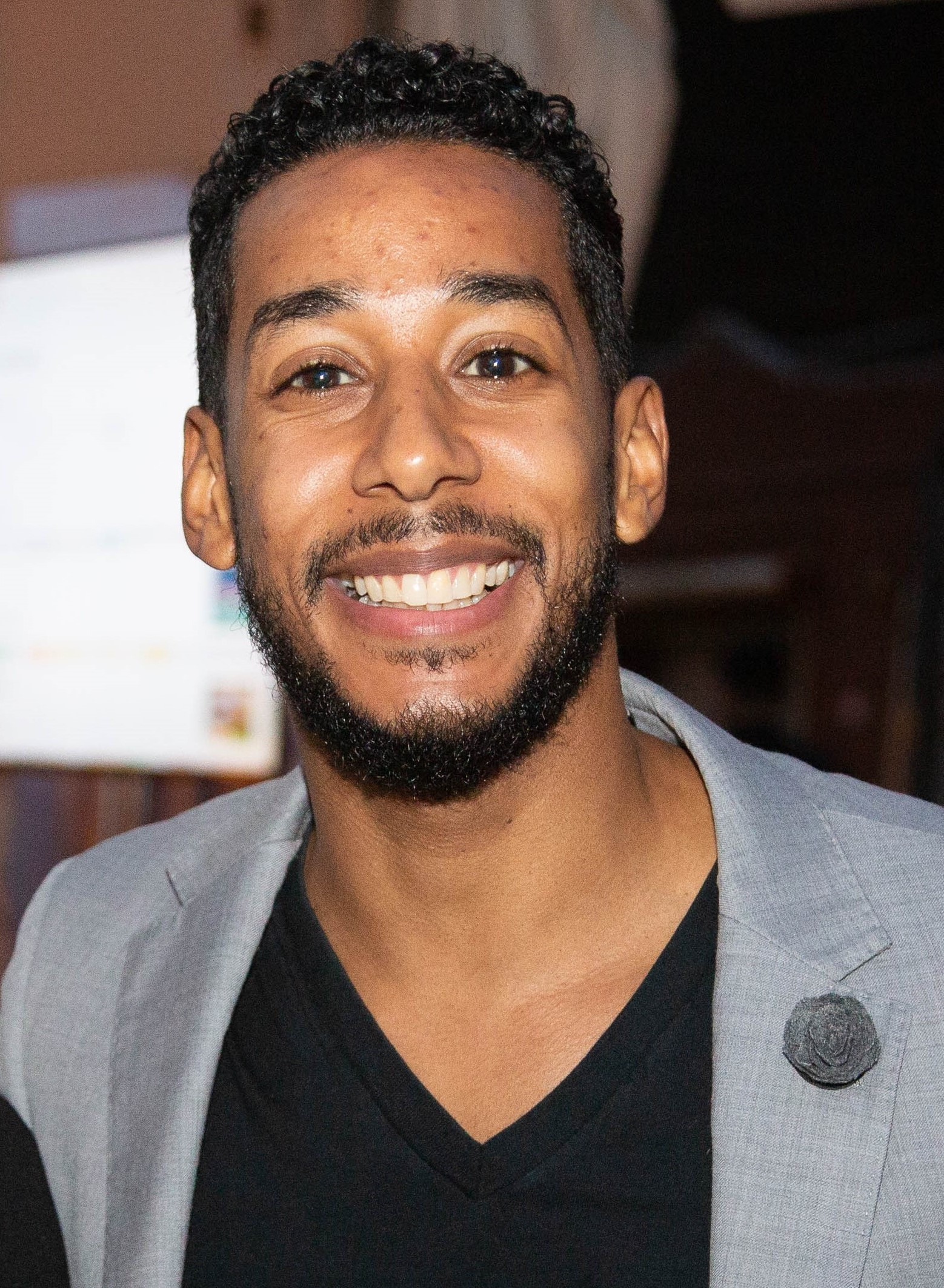

| Nominee | Antonio Reynoso | Menachem Raitport |
| Party | Democratic | Republican |
| Alliance | | Conservative |
| Popular vote | 235,118 | 74,068 |
| Percentage | 72.8% | 22.9% |
- Precinct results Reynoso: 40–50% 50–60% 60–70% 70–80% 80–90% >90% Raitport: 40–50% 50–60% 60–70% 70–80% 80–90% >90% Tie: 40–50% No votes
President before election
Eric Adams
Democratic
Elected President
Antonio Reynoso
Democratic

Incumbent Democrat Eric Adams was term-limited and barred from running for a third consecutive term. Instead of retiring, Adams successfully ran for mayor.

=== Democratic primary ===
Twelve candidates made it onto the ballot in the Democratic primary, three of whom were regarded as the frontrunners: City Councilmembers Robert Cornegy and Antonio Reynoso, and State Assemblymember Jo Anne Simon.

==== Declared ====
- Robert Cornegy, New York City Councilor for the 36th district
- Kimberly Council, non-profit executive
- Khari Edwards, activist
- Robert Elstein, artist and teacher
- Mathieu Eugene, New York City Councilor for the 40th district
- Pearlene Fields, member of Brooklyn Community Board 17
- Anthony Jones, District Leader for the 55th State Assembly District
- Shanduke McPhatter, activist
- Trisha Ocona, businesswoman
- Robert Ramos Jr., labor unionist
- Antonio Reynoso, New York City Councilor for the 34th district
- Jo Anne Simon, state assemblymember for the 52nd district
- Lamor Whitehead-Miller, pastor

==== Withdrew ====
- Rafael Espinal, councilmember
- Emmanuel Whitmore

==== Declined ====
- Chirlane McCray, First Lady of New York City

==== Endorsements ====
Robert Cornegy

Federal officials

- Edolphus Towns, former U.S. representative from New York's 10th congressional district

State officials

- Rodneyse Bichotte, assemblymember for the 42nd district
- William Colton, assemblymember for the 47th district
- Erik Martin Dilan, assemblymember for the 54th district
- Simcha Eichenstein, assemblymember for the 48th district
- Simcha Felder, state senator for the 17th district
- Mathylde Frontus, assemblymember for the 46th district
- Roxanne Persaud, state senator for the 19th district
- Diane Savino, state senator for the 23rd district
- Frank Seddio, former assemblymember for the 59th district
- Darryl C. Towns, former assemblymember for the 54th district
- Jaime Williams, assemblymember for the 59th district
- Tremaine Wright, former assemblymember for the 56th district

Local officials

- Justin Brannan, councilmember from the 43rd district
- Laurie Cumbo, councilmember from the 35th district
- Chaim Deutsch, former councilmember from the 48th district
- Darma Diaz, councilmember from the 37th district
- David G. Greenfield, former councilmember from the 48th district
- Alan Maisel, councilmember from the 46th district
- Kalman Yeger, councilmember from the 44th district

Individuals

- Spike Lee, director
- Tracy Morgan, actor

Labor unions

- Correction Officers' Benevolent Association
- International Brotherhood of Teamsters Local 237
- Transport Workers Union of America Local 100
Khari Edwards

Federal officials

- Yvette Clarke, U.S. representative from New York's 9th congressional district

State officials

- Kevin Parker, state senator for the 21st district
- N. Nick Perry, assemblymember for the 58th district
- Diana Richardson, assemblymember for the 43rd district
- Latrice Walker, assemblymember for the 55th district

Local officials

- Alicka Ampry-Samuel, councilmember from the 41st district

Labor unions

- District Council 37
Robert Ramos Jr.

Organizations

- Democracy for America
Antonio Reynoso

Federal legislators

- Bernie Sanders, U.S. Senator from Vermont
- Nydia Velázquez, U.S. representative from New York's 7th congressional district

State officials

- Maritza Davila, assemblymember for the 53rd district
- John Liu, state senator for the 11th district
- Marcela Mitaynes, assemblymember for the 51st district
- Jessica Ramos, state senator for the 13th district
- Julia Salazar, state senator for the 18th district

Local officials

- Margaret Chin, councilmember from the 1st district
- Brad Lander, councilmember from the 39th district
- Helen Rosenthal, councilmember from the 6th district
- Jumaane Williams, New York City Public Advocate

Individuals

- Cynthia Nixon, actress, candidate for governor of New York in 2018
- Sandy Nurse, activist and carpenter, candidate for New York City Council District 37
- Zephyr Teachout, attorney, candidate for governor of New York in 2014

Labor unions

- International Brotherhood of Teamsters Joint Council 16

Organizations

- Make the Road Action
- Our Revolution
- Working Families Party
Jo Anne Simon

Federal legislators

- Elizabeth Holtzman, former U.S. representative from New York's 16th congressional district
- Jerry Nadler, U.S. representative from New York's 10th congressional district

State officials

- Peter J. Abbate Jr., assemblymember for the 49th district
- Robert Carroll, assemblymember for the 44th district
- Andrew Gounardes, state senator for the 22nd district
- Joan Millman, former assemblymember for the 52nd district
- Velmanette Montgomery, former state senator for the 25th district

Local officials

- Betsy Gotbaum, former New York City Public Advocate

Labor unions

- United Federation of Teachers

Organizations

- Citizens Union
- Jim Owles Liberal Democratic Club

Newspapers and publications

- New York Amsterdam News
Lamor Whitehead-Miller

Individuals

- Fivio Foreign, rapper and songwriter
- Maino, rapper
- Tasha Page-Lockhart, gospel musician

==== Polling ====
===== Ranked-choice polls =====
| Poll source | Date(s) administered | Sample size | Margin of error | RCV count | Robert Cornegy | Kimberly Council | Khari Edwards | Mathieu Eugene | Antonio Reynoso | Jo Anne Simon | Others | Undecided |
|---|---|---|---|---|---|---|---|---|---|---|---|---|
| Benenson Strategy Group (D) (Note: This poll was sponsored by StudentsFirstNY, a pro-charter schools group.) | Apr 16–21, 2021 | 514 (LV) | ± 4.3% | BA (Note: Before allocation (including undecided respondents)) | 10% | 7% | 7% | 6% | 10% | 8% | 2% | 50% |
| Benenson Strategy Group (D) | Apr 16–21, 2021 | 514 (LV) | ± 4.3% | 1 | 20% | 15% | 14% | 13% | 20% | 17% | – | |
| Benenson Strategy Group (D) | Apr 16–21, 2021 | 514 (LV) | ± 4.3% | 2 | 23% | 17% | 18% | – | 22% | 19% | – | |
| Benenson Strategy Group (D) | Apr 16–21, 2021 | 514 (LV) | ± 4.3% | 3 | 27% | – | 22% | – | 29% | 22% | – | |
| Benenson Strategy Group (D) | Apr 16–21, 2021 | 514 (LV) | ± 4.3% | 4 | 33% | – | – | – | 41% | 27% | – | |
| Benenson Strategy Group (D) | Apr 16–21, 2021 | 514 (LV) | ± 4.3% | 5 | 45% | – | – | – | 55% | – | – | |

===== First-past-the-post polls =====
| Poll source | Date(s) administered | Sample size | Margin of error | Robert Cornegy | Kimberly Council | Khari Edwards | Mathieu Eugene | Antonio Reynoso | Jo Anne Simon | Others | Undecided |
|---|---|---|---|---|---|---|---|---|---|---|---|
| Benenson Strategy Group (D) (Note: First-choice results from a ranked-choice poll) | Apr 16–21, 2021 | 514 (LV) | ± 4.3% | 10% | 7% | 7% | 6% | 10% | 8% | 2% | 50% |

==== Results ====

Reynoso

10–20%
20–30%
30–40%
40–50%
50–60%
60–70%
70–80%
80–90%
90–100%

Simon

10–20%
20–30%
30–40%
40–50%
50–60%
60–70%
90–100%

Cornegy

10–20%
20–30%
30–40%
40–50%
50–60%
60–70%
70–80%
80–90%
90–100%

Eugene

10–20%
20–30%
30–40%
40–50%
50–60%

Edwards

10–20%
20–30%
30–40%
40–50%
60–70%

Council

10–20%
20–30%
30–40%

Ramos

10–20%
20–30%

Jones

10–20%
20–30%
30–40%

Ocana

90–100%

Elstein

20–30%
90–100%

Miller-Whitehead

90–100%

Other

10–30% tie
30–40% tie
50% tie
No votes

Reynoso

10–20%
20–30%
30–40%
40–50%
50–60%
60–70%
70–80%
80–90%
90–100%

Simon

10–20%
20–30%
30–40%
40–50%
50–60%
60–70%
90–100%

Cornegy

10–20%
20–30%
30–40%
40–50%
50–60%
60–70%
70–80%
80–90%
90–100%

Eugene

10–20%
20–30%
30–40%
40–50%
50–60%

Edwards

10–20%
20–30%
30–40%
40–50%
60–70%

Council

10–20%
20–30%
30–40%

Ramos

10–20%
20–30%

Jones

10–20%
20–30%
30–40%

Ocana

90–100%

Elstein

20–30%
90–100%

Miller-Whitehead

90–100%

Other

10–30% tie
30–40% tie
50% tie
No votes

Reynoso

10–20%
20–30%
30–40%
40–50%
50–60%
60–70%
70–80%
80–90%
90–100%

Simon

10–20%
20–30%
30–40%
40–50%
50–60%
60–70%
90–100%

Cornegy

10–20%
20–30%
30–40%
40–50%
50–60%
60–70%
70–80%
80–90%
90–100%

Eugene

10–20%
20–30%
30–40%
40–50%
50–60%

Edwards

10–20%
20–30%
30–40%
40–50%
60–70%
90–100%

Council

10–20%
20–30%
30–40%

Ramos

10–20%
20–30%

Jones

10–20%
20–30%
30–40%

Ocana

90–100%

Elstein

20–30%
30–40%
90–100%

Other

10–30% tie
30–40% tie
50% tie
No votes

Reynoso

10–20%
20–30%
30–40%
40–50%
50–60%
60–70%
70–80%
80–90%
90–100%

Simon

10–20%
20–30%
30–40%
40–50%
50–60%
60–70%
90–100%

Cornegy

10–20%
20–30%
30–40%
40–50%
50–60%
60–70%
70–80%
80–90%
90–100%

Eugene

10–20%
20–30%
30–40%
40–50%
50–60%

Edwards

10–20%
20–30%
30–40%
40–50%
60–70%
90–100%

Council

10–20%
20–30%
30–40%

Ramos

10–20%
20–30%

Jones

10–20%
20–30%
30–40%

Ocana

90–100%

Elstein

20–30%
30–40%
90–100%

Other

10–30% tie
30–40% tie
50% tie
No votes

Reynoso

10–20%
20–30%
30–40%
40–50%
50–60%
60–70%
70–80%
80–90%
90–100%

Simon

10–20%
20–30%
30–40%
40–50%
50–60%
60–70%
90–100%

Cornegy

10–20%
20–30%
30–40%
40–50%
50–60%
60–70%
70–80%
80–90%
90–100%

Eugene

10–20%
20–30%
30–40%
40–50%
50–60%

Edwards

10–20%
20–30%
30–40%
40–50%
60–70%
90–100%

Council

20–30%
30–40%

Ramos

20–30%

Jones

10–20%
20–30%
30–40%

Ocana

90–100%

Other

10–30% tie
30–40% tie
50% tie
No votes

Reynoso

10–20%
20–30%
30–40%
40–50%
50–60%
60–70%
70–80%
80–90%
90–100%

Simon

10–20%
20–30%
30–40%
40–50%
50–60%
60–70%
90–100%

Cornegy

10–20%
20–30%
30–40%
40–50%
50–60%
60–70%
70–80%
80–90%
90–100%

Eugene

10–20%
20–30%
30–40%
40–50%
50–60%
60–70%

Edwards

10–20%
20–30%
30–40%
40–50%
60–70%
90–100%

Council

10–20%
20–30%
30–40%

Ramos

20–30%
30–40%

Jones

20–30%
30–40%

Other

10–30% tie
30–40% tie
50% tie
No votes

Reynoso

10–20%
20–30%
30–40%
40–50%
50–60%
60–70%
70–80%
80–90%
90–100%

Simon

10–20%
20–30%
30–40%
40–50%
50–60%
60–70%
90–100%

Cornegy

10–20%
20–30%
30–40%
40–50%
50–60%
60–70%
70–80%
80–90%
90–100%

Eugene

10–20%
20–30%
30–40%
40–50%
50–60%
60–70%

Edwards

10–20%
20–30%
30–40%
40–50%
60–70%
90–100%

Council

20–30%
30–40%
40–50%

Ramos

20–30%
30–40%

Other

10–30% tie
30–40% tie
40–50% tie
50% tie
No votes

Reynoso

10–20%
20–30%
30–40%
40–50%
50–60%
60–70%
70–80%
80–90%
90–100%

Simon

20–30%
30–40%
40–50%
50–60%
60–70%
90–100%

Cornegy

20–30%
30–40%
40–50%
50–60%
60–70%
70–80%
80–90%
90–100%

Eugene

20–30%
30–40%
40–50%
50–60%
60–70%

Edwards

10–20%
20–30%
30–40%
40–50%
60–70%
90–100%

Council

20–30%
30–40%
40–50%

Other

10–30% tie
30–40% tie
50% tie
No votes

Reynoso

20–30%
30–40%
40–50%
50–60%
60–70%
70–80%
80–90%
90–100%

Simon

20–30%
30–40%
40–50%
50–60%
60–70%
70–80%
90–100%

Cornegy

20–30%
30–40%
40–50%
50–60%
60–70%
70–80%
80–90%
90–100%

Eugene

20–30%
30–40%
40–50%
50–60%
60–70%

Edwards

20–30%
30–40%
40–50%
50–60%
70–80%
90–100%

Other

20–30% tie
30–40% tie
40–50% tie
50% tie
No votes

Reynoso

30–40%
40–50%
50–60%
60–70%
70–80%
80–90%
90–100%

Simon

30–40%
40–50%
50–60%
60–70%
70–80%
90–100%

Cornegy

30–40%
40–50%
50–60%
60–70%
70–80%
80–90%
90–100%

Other

30–40% tie
40–50% tie
50% tie
No votes

Reynoso

50–60%
60–70%
70–80%
80–90%
90–100%

Simon

50–60%
60–70%
70–80%
80–90%
90–100%

Other

50% tie
No votes

2021 Brooklyn Borough President Democratic primary results
| Party | Candidate | Maximum round | Maximum votes | Share in maximum round | Maximum votes First round votes Transfer votes |
|---|---|---|---|---|---|
| Democratic | Antonio Reynoso | 11 | 107,963 | 54.9% | |
| Democratic | Jo Anne Simon | 11 | 88,794 | 45.1% | |
| Democratic | Robert Cornegy | 10 | 70,173 | 29.4% | |
| Democratic | Mathieu Eugene | 9 | 27,175 | 10.2% | |
| Democratic | Khari Edwards | 9 | 25,211 | 9.5% | |
| Democratic | Kim Council | 8 | 20,959 | 7.7% | |
| Democratic | Robert Ramos Jr. | 7 | 12,128 | 4.4% | |
| Democratic | Anthony Jones | 6 | 10,392 | 3.7% | |
| Democratic | Trisha Ocana | 5 | 9,570 | 3.4% | |
| Democratic | Robert Elstein | 4 | 7,151 | 2.5% | |
| Democratic | Pearlene Fields | 3 | 5,222 | 1.8% | |
| Democratic | Lamor Miller-Whitehead | 2 | 4,084 | 1.4% | |
| Write-in | | 1 | 706 | 0.2% | |

=== General election ===
==== Results ====
2021 Brooklyn borough president election
| Party | Candidate | Votes | % | ±% |
|---|---|---|---|---|
| Democratic | Antonio Reynoso | 235,118 | 72.84% | −10.11% |
| Republican | Menachem Raitport | 66,490 | 20.60% | +8.10% |
| Conservative | Menachem Raitport | 7,578 | 2.35% | −0.25% |
| Total | Menachem Raitport | 74,068 | 22.94% | +7.84% |
| Rent Is Too Damn High | Anthony Jones | 8,567 | 2.65% | N/A |
| Voices for Change | Shanduke McPhatter | 4,415 | 1.37% | N/A |
| Write-in | | 635 | 0.20% | |
| Total votes | | 322,803 | 100.0% | |
| Democratic hold | | | | |

== Queens ==
2021 Queens borough president election

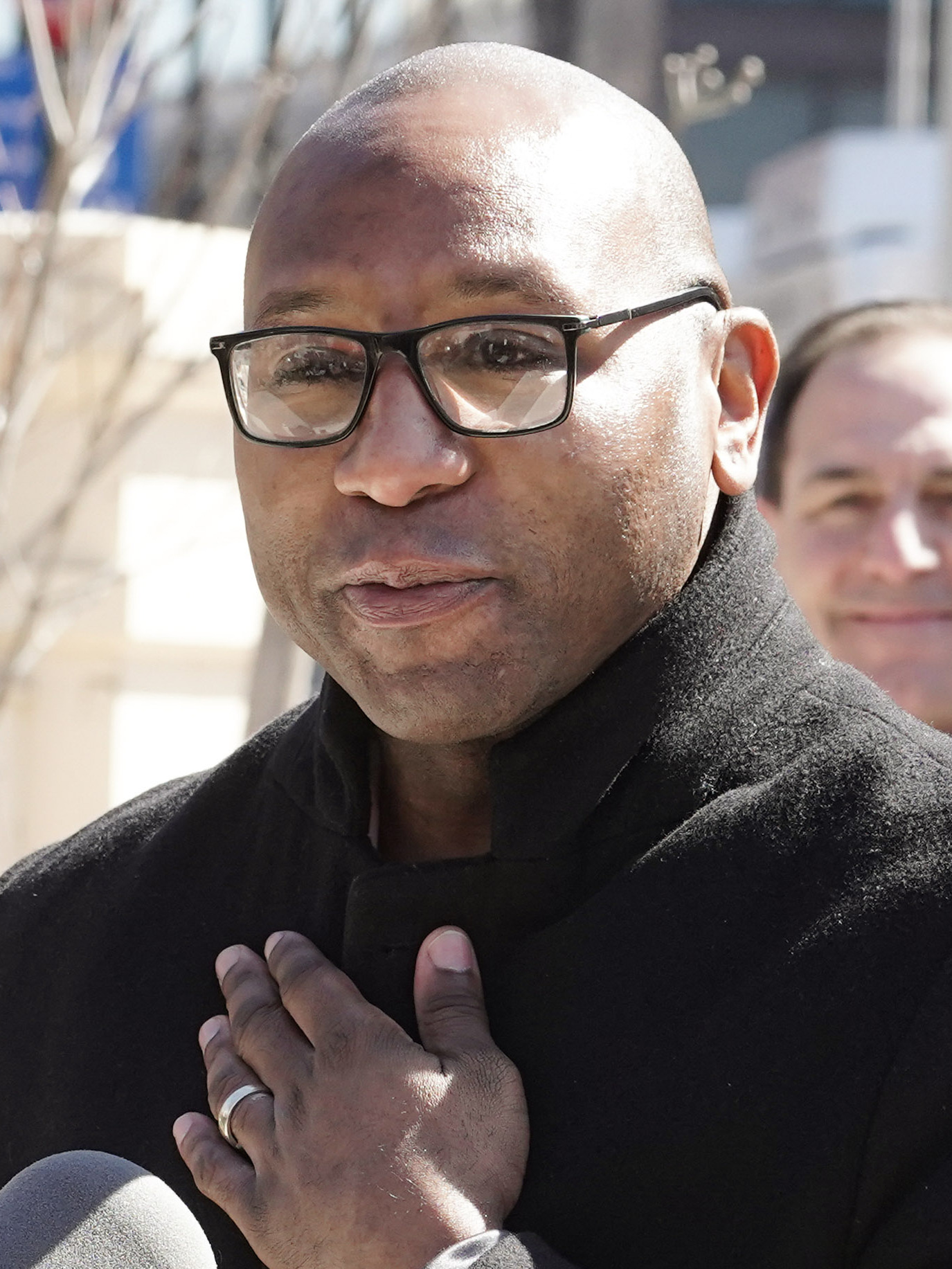

| Nominee | Donovan Richards | Thomas Zmich |
| Party | Democratic | Republican |
| Alliance | | Conservative |
| Popular vote | 181,947 | 89,645 |
| Percentage | 66.9% | 32.9% |
- Precinct results Richards: 50–60% 60–70% 70–80% 80–90% >90% Zmich: 50–60% 60–70% 70–80% 80–90% >90% Tie: 50% No votes
President before election
Donovan Richards
Democratic
Elected President
Donovan Richards
Democratic

Incumbent Democrat Donovan Richards assumed office in December 2020 after winning the November special election, and ran for a full term. He succeeded Sharon Lee, who became acting borough president after Melinda Katz resigned to take office as Queens County District Attorney.

=== Democratic primary ===
==== Declared ====
- Elizabeth Crowley, former councilmember, candidate for Queens borough president in 2020
- Donovan Richards, incumbent borough president
- Jimmy Van Bramer, councilmember

==== Withdrew ====
- Alicia Hyndman, New York State Assemblymember for the 29th district

==== Endorsements ====
Elizabeth Crowley

Individuals

- Elizabeth Holtzman, former U.S. representative from New York's 16th congressional district
Donovan Richards

Federal legislators

- Gregory Meeks, U.S. representative from New York's 5th congressional district

State legislators

- David Weprin, assemblymember for the 24th district

Individuals

- Costa Constantinides, former councilmember from the 22nd district

Labor unions

- New York City Central Labor Council
- SEIU Local 32BJ
- United Federation of Teachers

Organizations

- New York League of Conservation Voters
- Planned Parenthood of Greater New York Votes PAC
Jimmy Van Bramer

State legislators

- Ron Kim, assemblymember for the 40th district
- Jessica Ramos, state senator for the 13th district

Local officials

- Brad Lander, councilmember for the 39th district

Individuals

- Rana Abdelhamid, nonprofit founder and candidate for New York's 12th congressional district in 2022
- Dianne Morales, former nonprofit leader, and 2021 candidate for mayor of New York City
- Cynthia Nixon, actress, former candidate for governor of New York in 2018
- Kal Penn, actor
- Zephyr Teachout, attorney, professor, former candidate for governor of New York in 2014 and attorney general of New York in 2018

==== Polling ====
===== Ranked-choice polls =====
| Poll source | Date(s) administered | Sample size | Margin of error | RCV count | Elizabeth Crowley | Stan Morse | Donovan Richards | Diana Sanchez | Jimmy Van Bramer | Others | Undecided |
|---|---|---|---|---|---|---|---|---|---|---|---|
| Benenson Strategy Group (D) | Apr 16–21, 2021 | 358 (LV) | ± 5.2% | BA | 20% | 2% | 28% | 6% | 9% | 2% | 33% |
| Benenson Strategy Group (D) | Apr 16–21, 2021 | 358 (LV) | ± 5.2% | 1 | 31% | 3% | 43% | 9% | 14% | – | |
| Benenson Strategy Group (D) | Apr 16–21, 2021 | 358 (LV) | ± 5.2% | 2 | 33% | – | 43% | 10% | 14% | – | |
| Benenson Strategy Group (D) | Apr 16–21, 2021 | 358 (LV) | ± 5.2% | 3 | 36% | – | 46% | – | 18% | – | |
| Benenson Strategy Group (D) | Apr 16–21, 2021 | 358 (LV) | ± 5.2% | 4 | 44% | – | 56% | – | – | – | |

===== First-past-the-post polls =====
| Poll source | Date(s) administered | Sample size | Margin of error | Elizabeth Crowley | Stan Morse | Donovan Richards | Diana Sanchez | Jimmy Van Bramer | Others | Undecided |
|---|---|---|---|---|---|---|---|---|---|---|
| Benenson Strategy Group (D) | Apr 16–21, 2021 | 358 (LV) | ± 5.2% | 20% | 2% | 28% | 6% | 9% | 2% | 33% |

==== Results ====

Richards

30–40%
40–50%
50–60%
60–70%
70–80%
80–90%
90–100%

Crowley

30–40%
40–50%
50–60%
60–70%
70–80%
80–90%
90–100%

Van Bramer

30–40%
40–50%
50–60%
60–70%
70–80%
90–100%

Other

30–40% tie
40–50% tie
50% tie
No votes

Richards

30–40%
40–50%
50–60%
60–70%
70–80%
80–90%
90–100%

Crowley

30–40%
40–50%
50–60%
60–70%
70–80%
80–90%
90–100%

Van Bramer

30–40%
40–50%
50–60%
60–70%
70–80%
90–100%

Other

30–40% tie
40–50% tie
50% tie
No votes

Richards

50–60%
60–70%
70–80%
80–90%
90–100%

Crowley

50–60%
60–70%
70–80%
80–90%
90–100%

Other

50% tie
No votes

2021 Queens Borough President Democratic primary election results
| Party | Candidate | Maximum round | Maximum votes | Share in maximum round | Maximum votes First round votes Transfer votes |
|---|---|---|---|---|---|
| Democratic | Donovan Richards | 3 | 92,222 | 50.3% | |
| Democratic | Elizabeth Crowley | 3 | 91,153 | 49.7% | |
| Democratic | Jimmy Van Bramer | 2 | 34,306 | 17.6% | |
| Write-in | | 1 | 919 | 0.5% | |

=== Republican primary ===
==== Declared ====
- Danniel Maio, local activist and 2016 candidate for the New York's 6th congressional district
- Thomas Zmich, 2020 candidate for New York's 6th congressional district, retired union leader and organizer

==== Endorsements ====
Thomas Zmich

Organizations

- Conservative Party of New York State
- Queens County Republican Party
Danniel Maio

Individuals

- Curtis Sliwa

=== Results ===
2021 Queens borough president election
| Party | Candidate | Votes | % | ±% |
|---|---|---|---|---|
| Democratic | Donovan Richards (incumbent) | 181,947 | 66.86% | −2.99% |
| Republican | Thomas Zmich | 80,353 | 29.53% | +5.01% |
| Conservative | Thomas Zmich | 9,292 | 3.41% | +1.18% |
| Total | Thomas Zmich | 89,645 | 32.94% | +5.22% |
| Write-in | | 538 | 0.20% | |
| Total votes | | 272,130 | 100.0% | |
| Democratic hold | | | | |

== The Bronx ==
2021 Bronx borough president election

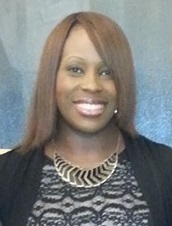

| Nominee | Vanessa Gibson | Janelle King | Sammy Ravelo |
| Party | Democratic | Republican | Conservative |
| Popular vote | 94,886 | 15,920 | 7,735 |
| Percentage | 79.9% | 13.4% | 6.5% |
- Precinct results Gibson: 30–40% 40–50% 50–60% 60–70% 70–80% 80–90% >90% King: 30–40% 40–50% 50–60% 60–70% 70–80% 80–90% >90% Tie: 40–50% 50% No votes
President before election
Rubén Díaz Jr.
Democratic
Elected President
Vanessa Gibson
Democratic

Incumbent Democrat Rubén Díaz Jr. was term-limited and could not run for a fourth consecutive term.

=== Democratic primary ===
==== Declared ====
- Fernando Cabrera, councilmember
- Nathalia Fernandez, assemblymember for the 80th district
- Vanessa Gibson, councilmember
- Victor H. Gutierrez
- Luis R. Sepúlveda, state senator for the 32nd district
- Bryan Hodge Vasquez

==== Withdrew ====
- Rafael Salamanca, councilmember

==== Endorsements ====
Fernando Cabrera

State legislators

- Jose Rivera, assemblymember for the 78th district

Organizations

- Sergeants Benevolent Association
Nathalia Fernandez

State legislators

- Brian Benjamin, state senator, for the 34th district
- Michael Blake, former assemblymember for the 79th district
- Kenny Burgos, assemblymember for the 85th district
- Chantel Jackson, assemblymember for the 79th district
Vanessa Gibson

Federal legislators

- Ritchie Torres, U.S. representative from New York's 15th congressional district

State legislators

- Latoya Joyner, assemblymember for the 77th district

Local officials

- Diana Ayala, councilmember for the 8th District
- Corey Johnson, Speaker of the New York City Council (2018–present) and councilmember for the 3rd district
- Jumaane Williams, New York City Public Advocate

Individuals

- James Vacca, former councilmember for the 13th district

Organizations

- Jim Owles Liberal Democratic Club
- Planned Parenthood of Greater New York Votes PAC

Labor unions

- 1199SEIU
- SEIU 32BJ
- United Federation of Teachers

Newspapers and publications

- New York Amsterdam News

==== Polling ====
===== Ranked-choice polls =====
| Poll source | Date(s) administered | Sample size | Margin of error | RCV count | Fernando Cabrera | Nathalia Fernandez | Vanessa Gibson | Samuel Ravelo | Luis Sepúlveda | Others | Undecided |
|---|---|---|---|---|---|---|---|---|---|---|---|
| Benenson Strategy Group (D) | Apr 16–21, 2021 | 249 (LV) | ± 6.2% | BA | 10% | 12% | 25% | 4% | 9% | 5% | 34% |
| Benenson Strategy Group (D) | Apr 16–21, 2021 | 249 (LV) | ± 6.2% | 1 | 17% | 19% | 42% | 7% | 16% | – | |
| Benenson Strategy Group (D) | Apr 16–21, 2021 | 249 (LV) | ± 6.2% | 2 | 19% | 23% | 42% | – | 16% | – | |
| Benenson Strategy Group (D) | Apr 16–21, 2021 | 249 (LV) | ± 6.2% | 3 | 25% | 29% | 45% | – | – | – | |
| Benenson Strategy Group (D) | Apr 16–21, 2021 | 249 (LV) | ± 6.2% | 4 | – | 42% | 58% | – | – | – | |

===== First-past-the-post polls =====
| Poll source | Date(s) administered | Sample size | Margin of error | Fernando Cabrera | Nathalia Fernandez | Vanessa Gibson | Samuel Ravelo | Luis Sepúlveda | Others | Undecided |
|---|---|---|---|---|---|---|---|---|---|---|
| Benenson Strategy Group (D) | Apr 16–21, 2021 | 249 (LV) | ± 6.2% | 10% | 12% | 25% | 4% | 9% | 5% | 34% |

==== Results ====

Gibson

20–30%
30–40%
40–50%
50–60%
60–70%
70–80%
80–90%

Cabrera

20–30%
30–40%
40–50%
50–60%
60–70%
70–80%
90–100%

Fernandez

30–40%
40–50%
50–60%

Sepulveda

20–30%
30–40%
40–50%
50–60%
60–70%
90–100%

Other

20–30% tie
30–40% tie
40–50% tie
50% tie
No votes

Gibson

20–30%
30–40%
40–50%
50–60%
60–70%
70–80%
80–90%

Cabrera

20–30%
30–40%
40–50%
50–60%
60–70%
70–80%
90–100%

Fernandez

30–40%
40–50%
50–60%

Sepulveda

20–30%
30–40%
40–50%
50–60%
60–70%
90–100%

Other

20–30% tie
30–40% tie
40–50% tie
50% tie
No votes

Gibson

50–60%
60–70%
70–80%
80–90%
90–100%

Cabrera

50–60%
60–70%
70–80%
80–90%
90–100%

Other

50% tie
No votes

2021 Bronx borough president Democratic primary election
| Party | Candidate | Maximum round | Maximum votes | Share in maximum round | Maximum votes First round votes Transfer votes |
|---|---|---|---|---|---|
| Democratic | Vanessa Gibson | 3 | 49,401 | 53.5% | |
| Democratic | Fernando Cabrera | 3 | 42,957 | 46.5% | |
| Democratic | Nathalia Fernandez | 2 | 14,501 | 14.3% | |
| Democratic | Luis R. Sepúlveda | 2 | 10,444 | 10.3% | |
| Democratic | Sammy Ravelo | 2 | 1,971 | 1.9% | |
| Write-in | | 1 | 582 | 0.6% | |

Official results for each round are as follows:

2021 Bronx borough president Democratic primary election
| Candidate | Round 1 | | Round 2 | | Round 3 | |
| Candidate | Votes | % | Votes | % | Votes | % |
|---|---|---|---|---|---|---|
| Vanessa Gibson | 40,097 | 39.5% | 40,148 | 39.7% | 49,401 | 53.5% |
| Fernando Cabrera | 34,022 | 33.5% | 34,130 | 33.7% | 42,957 | 46.5% |
| Nathalia Fernandez | 14,397 | 14.2% | 14,501 | 14.3% | Eliminated | |
| Luis R. Sepúlveda | 10,047 | 10.3% | 10,444 | 10.3% | Eliminated | |
| Sammy Ravelo | 1,958 | 1.9% | 1,971 | 1.9% | Eliminated | |
| Write-ins | 582 | 0.6% | Eliminated | | | |
| Inactive ballots | 0 ballots | | 226 ballots | | 8,178 ballots | |

=== Results ===
2021 Bronx borough president election
| Party | Candidate | Votes | % | ±% |
|---|---|---|---|---|
| Democratic | Vanessa Gibson | 94,886 | 79.93% | −8.15% |
| Republican | Janelle King | 15,920 | 13.41% | +6.83% |
| Conservative | Sammy Ravelo | 7,735 | 6.52% | +3.93% |
| Write-in | | 170 | 0.14% | |
| Total votes | | 118,711 | 100.0% | |
| Democratic hold | | | | |

== Staten Island ==
2021 Staten Island borough president election
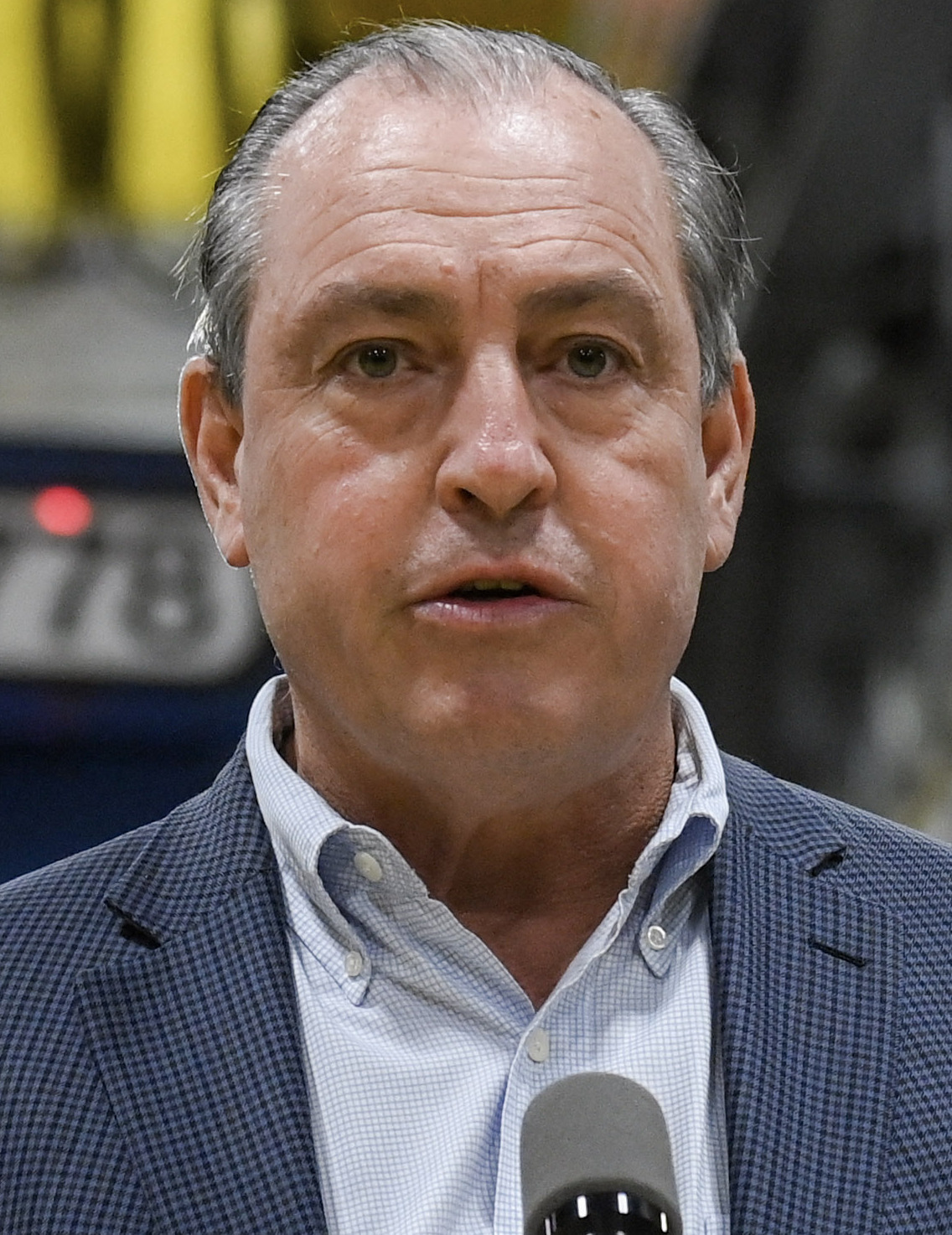

| Nominee | Vito Fossella | Mark Murphy | Leticia Remauro |
| Party | Republican | Democratic | Conservative |
| Popular vote | 63,331 | 34,022 | 7,892 |
| Percentage | 60.1% | 32.3% | 7.5% |
- Precinct results Fossella: 40–50% 50–60% 60–70% 70–80% 80–90% Murphy: 40–50% 50–60% 60–70% 70–80% 80–90% >90% No votes
President before election
James Oddo
Republican
Elected President
Vito Fossella
Republican

Incumbent Republican James Oddo was term-limited and could not run for a third consecutive term.

=== Republican primary ===
==== Declared ====
- Vito Fossella, former U.S. representative
- Jhong Kim, businessman
- Steven Matteo, councilmember
- Leticia Remauro, businesswoman

==== Endorsements ====
Vito Fossella

Executive officials

- Donald Trump, 45th president of the United States

Federal officials

- Peter King, former U.S. representative from NY-02

Local officials

- Rudy Giuliani, 2008 Republican presidential candidate and former mayor of New York City (1994–2001)
- James Molinaro, former Staten Island borough president

Organizations

- New York Young Republican Club
Steven Matteo

Organizations

- Amalgamated Transit Union
- Detectives' Endowment Association
- New York Young Republican Club
- Police Benevolent Association of the City of New York
- Uniformed Firefighters Association
Leticia Remauro

Executive officials

- Bernard Kerik, former Interior minister of the Iraq Coalition Provisional Authority

Organizations

- Conservative Party of New York State
- New York League of Conservation Voters

==== Results ====

Fossella

30–40%
40–50%
50–60%
60–70%
70–80%

Matteo

30–40%
40–50%
50–60%
60–70%
80–90%
90–100%

Remauro

30–40%
40–50%
50–60%

Kim

30–40%
60–70%

Other

30–40% tie
40–50% tie
50% tie
No votes

Fossella

30–40%
40–50%
50–60%
60–70%
70–80%

Matteo

30–40%
40–50%
50–60%
60–70%
80–90%
90–100%

Remauro

40–50%
50–60%

Kim

30–40%
60–70%

Other

30–40% tie
40–50% tie
50% tie
No votes

Fossella

50–60%
60–70%
70–80%

Matteo

50–60%
60–70%
70–80%
80–90%
90–100%

Other

50% tie
No votes

2021 Staten Island Borough President Republican primary results
| Party | Candidate | Maximum round | Maximum votes | Share in maximum round | Maximum votes First round votes Transfer votes |
|---|---|---|---|---|---|
| Republican | Vito Fossella | 3 | 9,459 | 51.2% | |
| Republican | Steven Matteo | 3 | 9,018 | 48.8% | |
| Republican | Leticia Remauro | 2 | 2,487 | 12.7% | |
| Republican | Jhong Kim | 2 | 556 | 2.8% | |
| Write-in | | 1 | 151 | 0.8% | |

=== Democratic primary ===
==== Declared ====
- Lorraine Honor, activist and businesswoman
- Radhakrishna Mohan, labor unionist
- Mark Murphy, businessman and nominee for New York's 11th congressional district in 2012
- Brandon Stradford, community advocate
- Cesar Vargas, attorney and reservist

==== Endorsements ====
Lorraine Honor

Federal officials

- Carolyn Maloney, U.S. representative from NY-12

Organizations

- EMILY's List
- Jim Owles Liberal Democratic Club
Mark Murphy

State officials

- Mike Cusick, state assemblymember
- Charles Fall, state assemblymember
- Diane Savino, state senator

Local officials

- Debi Rose, New York City councillor

Labor unions

- Retail, Wholesale and Department Store Union

Organizations

- New York League of Conservation Voters

==== Results ====

Murphy

20–30%
30–40%
40–50%
50–60%
60–70%
70–80%

Honor

20–30%
30–40%
40–50%

Vargas

30–40%

Stradford

20–30%
30–40%
40–50%

Other

20–30% tie
30–40% tie
No votes

Murphy

20–30%
30–40%
40–50%
50–60%
60–70%
70–80%

Honor

20–30%
30–40%
40–50%

Vargas

30–40%

Stradford

20–30%
30–40%
40–50%

Other

20–30% tie
30–40% tie
No votes

Murphy

30–40%
40–50%
50–60%
60–70%
70–80%

Honor

30–40%
40–50%

Vargas

20–30%
30–40%

Stradford

30–40%
40–50%

Other

30–40% tie
No votes

Murphy

30–40%
40–50%
50–60%
60–70%
70–80%
80–90%

Honor

30–40%
40–50%
50–60%

Vargas

30–40%
40–50%

Other

30–40% tie
40–50% tie
No votes

Murphy

50–60%
60–70%
70–80%
80–90%
90–100%

Honor

50–60%
60–70%

Other

50% tie
No votes

2021 Staten Island borough president Democratic primary election
| Party | Candidate | Maximum round | Maximum votes | Share in maximum round | Maximum votes First round votes Transfer votes |
|---|---|---|---|---|---|
| Democratic | Mark Murphy | 3 | 16,355 | 65.0% | |
| Democratic | Lorraine Honor | 3 | 8,815 | 35.0% | |
| Democratic | Cesar Vargas | 2 | 5,103 | 19.1% | |
| Democratic | Brandford Stradford | 3 | 2,831 | 10.2% | |
| Democratic | Radhakrishna Mohan | 2 | 2,098 | 7.4% | |
| Write-in | | 1 | 335 | 1.2% | |

=== General election ===
==== Results ====
2021 Staten Island borough president election
| Party | Candidate | Votes | % | ±% |
|---|---|---|---|---|
| Republican | Vito Fossella | 63,331 | 60.07% | −14.73% |
| Democratic | Mark Murphy | 32,528 | 30.85% | +8.16% |
| Staten Island 1st | Mark Murphy | 1,494 | 1.42% | N/A |
| Total | Mark Murphy | 34,022 | 32.27% | +8.05% |
| Conservative | Leticia Remauro | 7,892 | 7.49% | −1.93% |
| Write-in | | 179 | 0.17% | |
| Total votes | | 105,424 | 100.00% | |
| Republican hold | | | | |

== See also ==
- 2021 New York City mayoral election
- 2021 New York City Comptroller election
- 2021 New York City Council election

== Notes ==
Partisan clients
