= Jennifer Gutiérrez (politician) =

American politician and community organizer (born 1986)

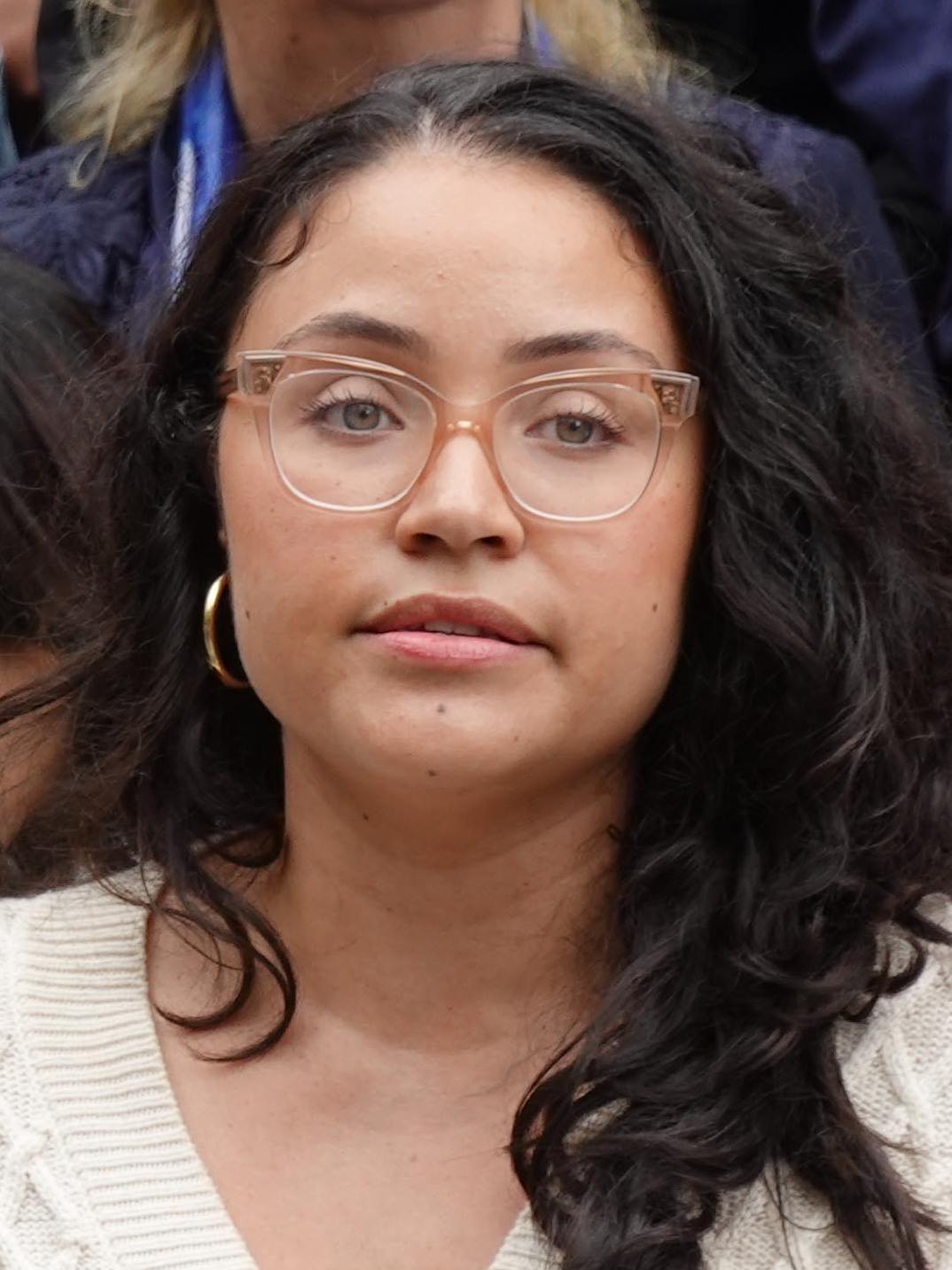

Member of the New York City Council from the 34th district
- Incumbent
- Assumed office January 1, 2022
- Preceded by: Antonio Reynoso

Personal details
- Born: September 14, 1986 (age 40) New York City, New York, U.S.
- Party: Democratic
- Education: State University of New York, Albany (BA)
- Website: Official website Campaign website

Jennifer Gutiérrez (born September 14, 1986) is an American politician and community organizer currently serving as the council member for the 34th district in the New York City Council. The district includes portions of Bushwick and Williamsburg in Brooklyn and Ridgewood, Queens.

A Queens-born daughter of immigrants from Colombia, Gutiérrez is the first Colombian-American member of the New York City Council. She resides in Bushwick.

== Early life and education ==
Gutiérrez was born and raised in Queens. Her parents emigrated from Colombia in the 1980s. She grew up in a one-bedroom apartment in Queens with her mother, father and sister. She attended Jacqueline Kennedy Onassis High School, and later attended and graduated from SUNY Albany with a B.A. in political science.

== Career ==
In 2012, Gutiérrez became involved in politics with the Arizona Democratic Party as a field organizer. In 2013, she became a field organizer for the New York City Council Office of Diana Reyna.

=== Campaigns ===
In 2013, Gutiérrez was the campaign manager for Antonio Reynoso's successful campaign for New York City Council. In 2016, she managed Nydia Velazquez's successful re-election bid for Congress.

=== New York City Council ===
Gutiérrez served as the chief of staff to City Council Member Antonio Reynoso from 2014 until 2021, and led eight cycles of Participatory Budgeting, which resulted in over $5 million in investments in public spaces such as schools, streets, parks, and NYCHA. Gutiérrez played a leading role in passing the Right to Know Act, which brought transparency to police stops, as well as the Waste Equity Bill, which reduced the amount of trash trucks and the associated pollution in North Brooklyn.

=== Elected office ===
Gutiérrez won a primary election in June 2021 by a wide margin in a rank choice voting election and was elected to represent Council District 34 in November 2021. She ran for re-election in 2024 unopposed, and won with 99.5% of the vote. Gutiérrez is the first Colombian-American member of the New York City Council. She served as chairperson of the Committee on Technology until 2025, when she was appointed Chairperson of the Subcommittee on Early Childhood Education.

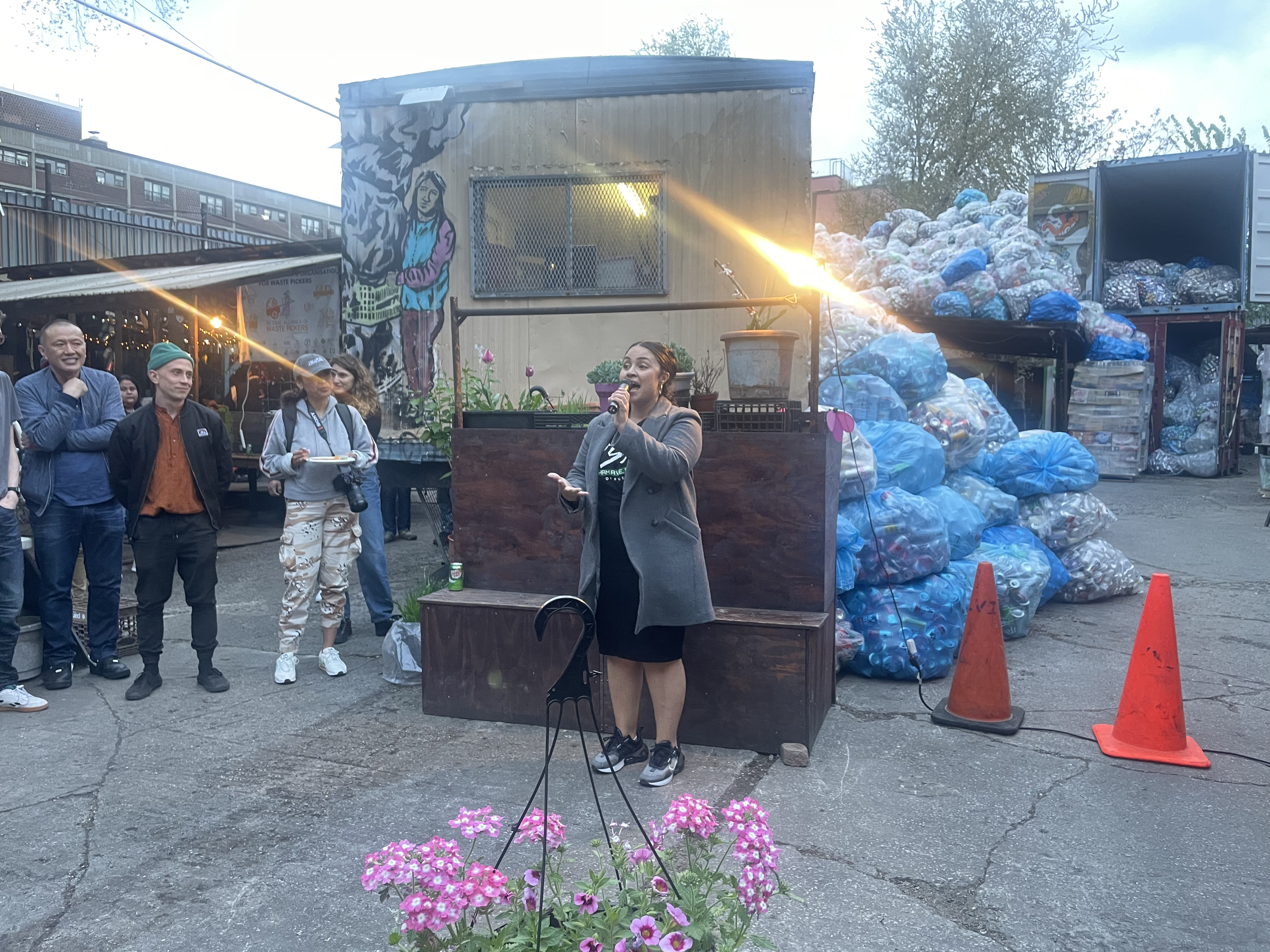
Gutierrez speaks at an Earth Day 2023 event at Sure We Can, on McKibbin Street.

== Personal life ==
Gutiérrez and her husband have two daughters, born in November 2021 and December 2024. She lives in Bushwick, Brooklyn with her family.

== Electoral history ==
=== 2025 ===
2025 New York City Council election, District 34
Party	Candidate	Votes	%
Democratic	Jennifer Gutiérrez	32,206	72.1
Working Families	Jennifer Gutiérrez	12,196	27.3
Total	Jennifer Gutiérrez (incumbent)	44,402	99.5
Write-in		242	0.5
Total votes		44,644	100.0
Democratic hold			

=== 2023 ===
2023 New York City Council Democratic primary, District 34
Party	Candidate	Votes	%
Democratic	Jennifer Gutiérrez (incumbent)	3,002	81.2
Democratic	Paperboy Love Prince	677	18.3
Write-in		19	0.5
Total votes		3,698	100.0

2023 New York City Council election, District 34
Party	Candidate	Votes	%
Democratic	Jennifer Gutiérrez	5,297	66.7
Working Families	Jennifer Gutiérrez	2,218	27.9
Total	Jennifer Gutiérrez (incumbent)	7,515	94.6
Medical Freedom	Marguerite Chandler	373	4.7
Write-in		52	0.7
Total votes		7,940	100.0
Democratic hold			

=== 2021 ===
2021 New York City Council Democratic primary, District 34
Party	Candidate	Votes	%
Democratic	Jennifer Gutiérrez	13,065	79.5
Democratic	Scott Murphy	1,406	8.6
Democratic	Andy J. Marte	1,263	7.7
Democratic	Lutchi Gayot	630	3.8
Write-in		74	0.5
Total votes		16,438	100.0

2021 New York City Council election, District 34
Party	Candidate	Votes	%
Democratic	Jennifer Gutiérrez	13,549	98.4
Blk Lives Matter	Lutchi Gayot	690	4.6
Power 2 the People	Terrell Lynn Finner	675	4.5
Write-in		82	1.6
Total votes		14,996	100.0
Democratic hold			

Political offices
Preceded by Antonio Reynoso	Member of the New York City Council from the 34th district 2022–present	Incumbent
