= Antonio Reynoso =

American politician and community organizer (born 1983)

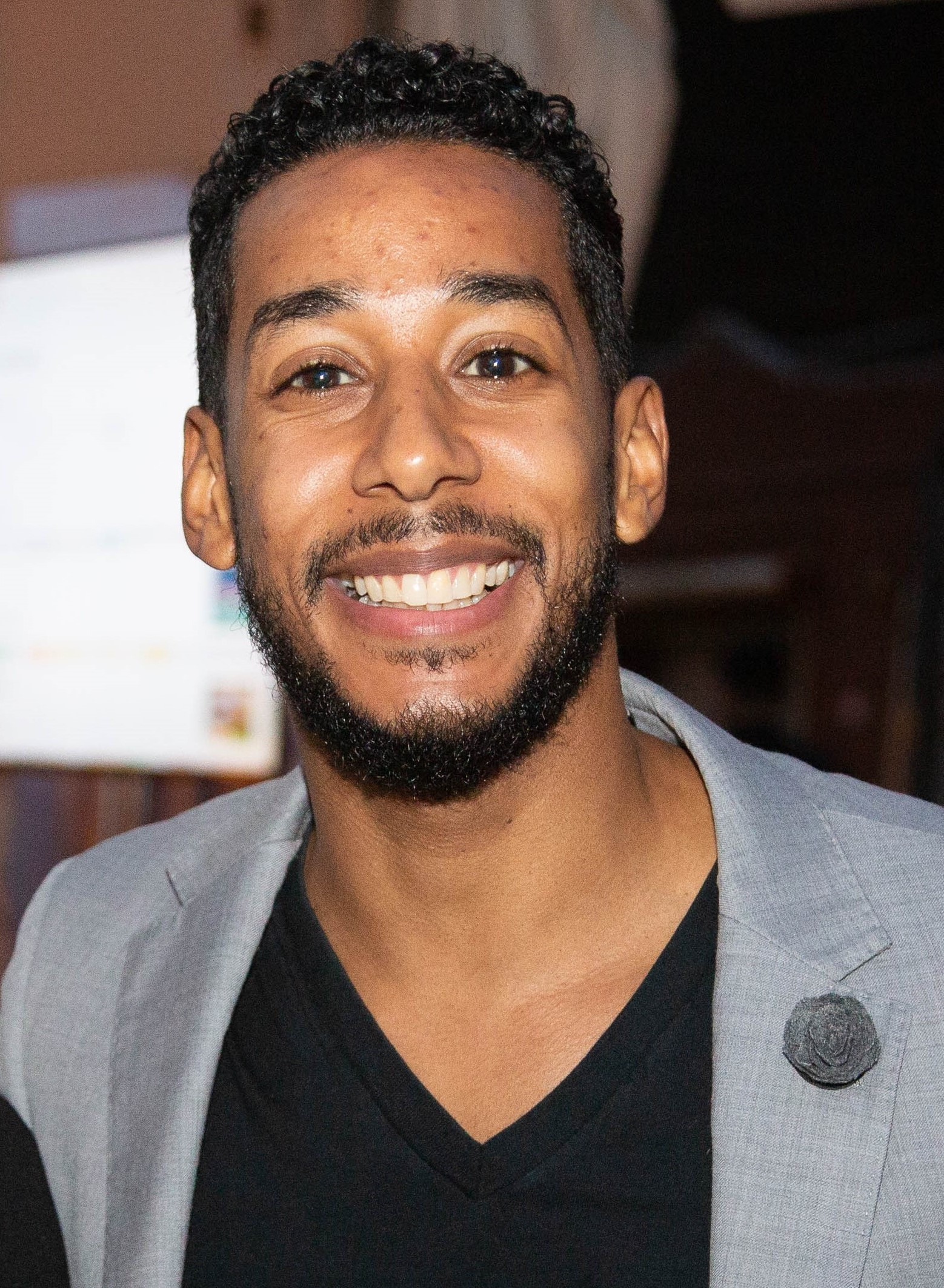
- Reynoso in 2018

19th Borough President of Brooklyn
- Incumbent
- Assumed office January 1, 2022
- Deputy: Diana Richardson; Kim Council
- Preceded by: Eric Adams

Member of the New York City Council from the 34th district
- In office January 1, 2014 – December 31, 2021
- Preceded by: Diana Reyna
- Succeeded by: Jennifer Gutiérrez

Personal details
- Born: May 9, 1983 (age 43)
- Party: Democratic
- Spouse: Iliana Gomez
- Education: Le Moyne College (BA)

Antonio Reynoso (born May 9, 1983) is an American politician and community organizer serving as borough president of Brooklyn since 2022. He is a member of the Democratic Party, and was elected Brooklyn borough president in the 2021 election. He previously was a member of the New York City Council for the 34th district from 2014 to 2021. The district included portions of Bushwick, Greenpoint, and Williamsburg in Brooklyn and Ridgewood, Queens.

In 2026, Reynoso announced a run for New York's 7th Congressional district to succeed retiring incumbent Nydia Velázquez, who endorsed him. He was defeated in the Democratic primary by democratic socialist Claire Valdez.

== Early life and career ==
Reynoso was born in Brooklyn and raised in the Los Sures section of Williamsburg to immigrant parents from the Dominican Republic. He graduated from Le Moyne College with a bachelor's degree in political science.

Reynoso started his political career as a community organizer for NYC ACORN; one of his assignments was to organize childcare providers to join the United Food and Commercial Workers union. In 2009, he became chief of staff to Diana Reyna, the member of the New York City Council for District 34.

== New York City Council ==
With Reyna prevented from running for reelection in 2013 due to term limits, Reynoso ran to succeed her The district included Bushwick, Ridgewood, and Williamsburg. Reynoso succeeded to office after defeating Vito Lopez in the Democratic primary.

During both his terms, Reynoso served as chair of the City Council's Committee on Sanitation & Solid Waste Management. He also co-chaired the council's Progressive Caucus.

== Brooklyn Borough President ==
In July 2021, Reynoso won the Democratic Party's nomination for borough president of Brooklyn (formally known as Kings County). He defeated 13 other candidates in the Democratic primary. In the final round (Round 11) of the ranked-choice voting election, he defeated Assemblywoman Jo Anne Simon, 54.9% to 45.1%. In the preceding round, fellow City Councilmember Robert Cornegy was eliminated. Other contenders eliminated in earlier rounds included Mathieu Eugene.

Reynoso then easily won the November 2021 general election, defeating against Republican candidate Menachem M. Raitport and Voices for Change candidate Shanduke McPhatter.

In October 2022, Reynoso fired his deputy borough president, Diana Richardson, a former Crown Heights assemblywoman, following a string of staff and constituent complaints about her behavior.

In 2026, the Coney Island Mermaid Parade faced financial difficulties with organizers at Coney Island USA running a GoFundMe campaign to raise funds and save the event. When Reynoso heard about the Parade's financial difficulties, he pledged $20,000 and committed to providing that same amount annually throughout his remaining time in office "to secure the future of the historic Mermaid Parade".

== Political positions ==
Ideologically, Reynoso is a progressive. At age 22, before his election to the City Council, he co-founded New Kings Democrats, a progressive reform-oriented grouping of the Brooklyn Democratic Party; the faction has struggled for control of the borough's party organization, clashing with bosses Vito Lopez and Rodneyse Bichotte Hermelyn.

=== Housing and land use ===
In 2019, as a city councilmember, Reynoso proposed a plan to create new historic districts to limit development in Bushwick, preserve manufacturing zoning, and allow no more than 2,000 new housing units, all at below-market rates (in contrast to a plan by Mayor Bill de Blasio to allow 5,613 new units of housing, including 1,873 units permanently earmarked for below-market-rate).

In November 2021, upon winning election as borough president, Reynoso criticized past mayors for what he called overdevelopment, and that he wanted to "empower community boards to dictate what their communities look like in 10 years." However, in 2023 and 2024, Reynoso supported more housing construction, and proposed plans to upzone Brooklyn to permit more housing. He also criticized NIMBYism and efforts to block housing construction based on notions of "neighborhood character." In November 2023, he criticized Mayor Eric Adams for slow progress on addressing the New York City housing crisis, and suggested that New York City should eliminate single-family-exclusive zoning.

As a city councilmember and as Brooklyn BP, Reynoso has supported initiatives to protect the safety of pedestrians and bicyclists, including Vision Zero. He supports the end of parking minimums and has criticized illegal parking, such as double parking and parking on sidewalks, parks, and bike lanes. In January 2022, six days into his tenure as borough president, Reynoso put an end to illicit parking on the Brooklyn Borough Hall plaza, ending the widely criticized practice of his predecessor Adams, who allowed his employees to illegally park their private vehicles across the plaza during his tenure. In 2024, after a series of pedestrian deaths caused by turning cars at intersections, Reynoso and other Brooklyn elected officials called for universal daylighting.

=== Crime and policing ===
On the Council, Reynoso was the lead sponsor of the Right to Know Act; the act require New York Police Department officers to hand out business cards with their name and rank to persons they stop, and to inform persons stopped by police of their right to decline a consent search. The bill, passed in response to NYPD's use of stop-and-frisk, was enacted in 2017 and took effect in 2018.

In 2019, Reynoso voted to support New York Mayor Bill de Blasio's plan to eventually close Rikers Island, the city's long-troubled jail complex, and replace it with newly constructed borough-based jails.

== 2026 congressional campaign ==
2026 Democratic primary results by precinct Valdez: 30–40%; 40–50%; 50–60%; 60–70%; 70–80%; 80–90%; 90–100%; Reynoso: 30–40%; 40–50%; 50–60%; 60–70%; 70–80%; 80–90%; 90–100%; Won: 30–40%; 40–50%; Tie: 30–40%; 40–50%

On January 8, 2026, Reynoso announced his candidacy for New York's 7th congressional district to succeed retiring incumbent Nydia Velázquez. He faced Assembly Member Claire Valdez and New York City Councilor Julie Won in the primary. The race was seen as a fight between progressives, who largely backed Reynoso, and socialists, who backed Valdez. Reynoso received the support of Velázquez, Working Families Party, and a majority of labor unions. Valdez was endorsed by New York City mayor Zohran Mamdani, Senator Bernie Sanders, NYC-DSA, Justice Democrats, and the United Auto Workers.

Despite publicly available polling indicating a close race within the margin of error, Valdez ultimately defeated Reynoso by a 20 point margin.

== Election history ==
=== 2013 ===
New York City Council elections District 34 Democratic primary, September 10, 2013
Party	Candidate	Votes	%
Democratic	Antonio Reynoso	6,205	50.2
Democratic	Vito J. Lopez	4,551	36.8
Democratic	Gladys Santiago	967	7.8
Democratic	Humberto Soto	632	5.1
Democratic	Write-ins	3	0.0
Total votes		12,358	100

New York City Council elections District 34 election, November 5, 2013
Party	Candidate	Votes	%
Democratic	Antonio Reynoso	13,123	
Working Families	Antonio Reynoso	1,313	
Total	Antonio Reynoso	13,581	95.9
School Choice	Gladys Santiago	557	3.9
n/a	Write-ins	28	0.2
Total votes		14,166	100

=== 2017 ===
2017 New York City Council elections District 34 Democratic primary
Party	Candidate	Votes	%
Democratic	Antonio Reynoso (incumbent)	6,710	63.9
Democratic	Tommy Torres	3,765	35.9
Democratic	Write-ins	22	0.2
Total votes		10,497	100

2017 New York City Council election District 34
Party	Candidate	Votes	%
Democratic	Antonio Reynoso	14,358	
Working Families	Antonio Reynoso	2,210	
Total	Antonio Reynoso (incumbent)	16,568	99.1
Write-in		143	0.9
Total votes		16,711	100

=== 2021 ===
2021 Brooklyn Borough President Democratic primary results
Party	Candidate	Maximum round	Maximum votes	Share in maximum round	Maximum votes First round votes Transfer votes
Democratic	Antonio Reynoso	11	107,963	54.9%	
Democratic	Jo Anne Simon	11	88,794	45.1%	
Democratic	Robert Cornegy	10	70,173	29.4%	
Democratic	Mathieu Eugene	9	27,175	10.2%	
Democratic	Khari Edwards	9	25,211	9.5%	
Democratic	Kim Council	8	20,959	7.7%	
Democratic	Robert Ramos Jr.	7	12,128	4.4%	
Democratic	Anthony Jones	6	10,392	3.7%	
Democratic	Trisha Ocana	5	9,570	3.4%	
Democratic	Robert Elstein	4	7,151	2.5%	
Democratic	Pearlene Fields	3	5,222	1.8%	
Democratic	Lamor Miller-Whitehead	2	4,084	1.4%	
Write-in		1	706	0.2%	

2021 Brooklyn borough president election
Party	Candidate	Votes	%	±%
Democratic	Antonio Reynoso	235,118	72.84%	−10.11%
Republican	Menachem Raitport	66,490	20.60%	+8.10%
Conservative	Menachem Raitport	7,578	2.35%	−0.25%
Total	Menachem Raitport	74,068	22.94%	+7.84%
Rent Is Too Damn High	Anthony Jones	8,567	2.65%	N/A
Voices for Change	Shanduke McPhatter	4,415	1.37%	N/A
Write-in		635	0.20%	
Total votes		322,803	100.0%	

=== 2025 ===
2025 Brooklyn Borough President Democratic primary results
Party	Candidate	Votes	%
Democratic	Antonio Reynoso (incumbent)	257,684	77.1
Democratic	Khari Edwards	75,021	22.4
Write-in		1,605	0.5
Total votes		334,310	100.0

2025 Brooklyn borough president election
Party	Candidate	Votes	%	±%
Democratic	Antonio Reynoso	391,722	65.80	
Working Families	Antonio Reynoso	99,884	16.78	
Total	Antonio Reynoso (incumbent)	491,606	82.57	
Republican	Janine Acquafredda	90,566	15.21	
Conservative	Janine Acquafredda	11,967	2.01	
Total	Janine Acquafredda	102,533	17.22	
Write-in		1,212	0.20	
Total votes		595,351	100%	

=== 2026 ===
2026 New York's 7th congressional district election Democratic primary
Party	Candidate	Votes	%
Democratic	Claire Valdez	37,531	56.1
Democratic	Antonio Reynoso	23,960	35.8
Democratic	Julie Won	4,231	6.3
Democratic	Vichal Kumar	1,134	1.7
Democratic	Write-in	97	0.1
Total votes		66,953	100.0

Political offices
Preceded by Eric Adams	Borough President of Brooklyn; 2022–present	Incumbent
