= New York City's 34th City Council district =

- Boundaries following the 2020 census

Government
  - Councilmember: . Jennifer Gutiérrez. D–Williamsburg

Population (2010)
  - Total: 158,141

Demographics
  - Hispanic: 55%
  - White: 26%
  - Black: 10%
  - Asian: 7%
  - Other: 2%

Registration
  - Democratic: 74.9%
  - Republican: 4.7%
  - No party preference: 17.7%
- Registered voters (2021) 121,434

New York City's 34th City Council district is one of 51 districts in the New York City Council. It has been represented by Democrat Jennifer Gutiérrez since 2022.

== Geography ==
District 34 covers several majority-Hispanic neighborhoods straddling the border between Brooklyn and Queens, including parts of Bushwick, Williamsburg, and Ridgewood.

The district overlaps with Queens Community Board 5 and Brooklyn Community Boards 1 and 4, and with New York's 7th, 8th, and 12th congressional districts. It also overlaps with the 12th, 15th, 18th, and 26th districts of the New York State Senate, and with the 37th, 38th, 50th, 53rd, and 54th districts of the New York State Assembly.

The district is only one of two in the City Council to span two different boroughs, the other being the 8th district in Manhattan and the Bronx.

== Members representing the district ==
Members	Party	Years served	Electoral history
District established January 1, 1983
Joseph F. Lisa (Corona)	Democratic	January 1, 1983 – December 31, 1991	Elected in 1982. Re-elected in 1985. Re-elected in 1989. Retired to run for Queens Civil Court.
Victor L. Robles (Williamsburg)	Democratic	January 1, 1992 – December 31, 2001	Elected in 1991. Re-elected in 1993. Re-elected in 1997. Termed out.
Diana Reyna (Bushwick)	Democratic	January 1, 2002 – December 31, 2013	Elected in 2001. Re-elected in 2003. Re-elected in 2005. Re-elected in 2009. Termed out.
Antonio Reynoso (Bushwick)	Democratic	January 1, 2014 – December 31, 2021	Elected in 2013. Re-elected in 2017. Termed out and ran for Brooklyn Borough President.
Jennifer Gutiérrez (Bushwick)	Democratic	January 1, 2022 –	Elected in 2021. Re-elected in 2023. Re-elected in 2025.

== Recent election results ==
=== 2025 ===
2025 New York City Council election, District 34
Party	Candidate	Votes	%
Democratic	Jennifer Gutiérrez	32,206	
Working Families	Jennifer Gutiérrez	12,196	
Total	Jennifer Gutiérrez (incumbent)	44,402	99.5
Write-in		242	0.5
Total votes		44,644	100.0
Democratic hold			

=== 2023 (redistricting) ===
Due to redistricting and the 2020 changes to the New York City Charter, councilmembers elected during the 2021 and 2023 City Council elections will serve two-year terms, with full four-year terms resuming after the 2025 New York City Council elections.

2023 New York City Council election, District 34
Primary election
Party	Candidate	Votes	%
Democratic	Jennifer Gutiérrez (incumbent)	3,002	81.2
Democratic	Paperboy Prince	677	18.3
Write-in		19	0.5
Total votes		3,698	100.0
General election
Democratic	Jennifer Gutiérrez	5,297	
Working Families	Jennifer Gutiérrez	2,218	
Total	Jennifer Gutiérrez (incumbent)	7,515	94.6
Medical Freedom	Marguerite Chandler	373	4.7
Write-in		52	0.7
Total votes		7,940	100.0
Democratic hold			

=== 2021 ===
In 2019, voters in New York City approved Ballot Question 1, which implemented ranked-choice voting in all local elections. Under the new system, voters have the option to rank up to five candidates for every local office. Voters whose first-choice candidates fare poorly will have their votes redistributed to other candidates in their ranking until one candidate surpasses the 50 percent threshold. If one candidate surpasses 50 percent in first-choice votes, then ranked-choice tabulations will not occur.

An interactive map of District 34

2021 New York City Council election, District 34
Primary election
Party	Candidate	Votes	%
Democratic	Jennifer Gutiérrez	13,065	79.5
Democratic	Scott Murphy	1,406	8.6
Democratic	Andy Marte	1,263	7.7
Democratic	Lutchi Gayot	630	3.8
Write-in		74	0.5
Total votes		16,438	100
General election
Democratic	Jennifer Gutiérrez	13,549	90.3
Black Lives Matter	Lutchi Gayot	690	4.6
Power to the People	Terrell Finner	675	4.5
Write-in		82	0.6
Total votes		14,996	100
Democratic hold			

=== 2017 ===
2017 New York City Council election, District 34
Primary election
Party	Candidate	Votes	%
Democratic	Antonio Reynoso (incumbent)	6,710	63.9
Democratic	Tommy Torres	3,765	35.9
Write-in		22	0.2
Total votes		10,497	100
General election
Democratic	Antonio Reynoso	14,358	
Working Families	Antonio Reynoso	2,210	
Total	Antonio Reynoso (incumbent)	16,568	99.1
Write-in		143	0.9
Total votes		16,711	100
Democratic hold			

=== 2013 ===
2013 New York City Council election, District 34
Primary election
Party	Candidate	Votes	%
Democratic	Antonio Reynoso	6,205	50.2
Democratic	Vito Lopez	4,551	36.8
Democratic	Gladys Santiago	967	7.8
Democratic	Humberto Soto	632	5.1
Write-in		3	0.0
Total votes		12,358	100
Working Families	Antonio Reynoso	8	80.0
Write-in		2	20.0
Total votes		10	100
General election
Democratic	Antonio Reynoso	12,268	
Working Families	Antonio Reynoso	1,313	
Total	Antonio Reynoso	13,581	95.9
School Choice	Gladys Santiago	557	3.9
Write-in		28	0.2
Total votes		14,166	100
Democratic hold			
