= New York's 52nd State Assembly district =

American legislative district

Assemblymember
| Jo Anne Simon; D–Boerum Hill |

New York's 52nd State Assembly district is one of the 150 districts in the New York State Assembly. It has been represented by Democrat Jo Anne Simon since 2015 who is seeking re-election. It was represented by Joan Millman prior to January 2015.

== Geography ==
=== 2020s ===
The district includes portions of Brooklyn Heights, Downtown Brooklyn, Cobble Hill, Carroll Gardens, Gowanus, Park Slope, Prospect Heights, Boerum Hill and DUMBO in Brooklyn. The Brooklyn Navy Yard and Grand Army Plaza are located within this district.

The district overlaps (partially) with New York's 7th and 10th congressional districts. It also overlaps the 18th, 20th, 25th and 26th districts of the New York State Senate and the 33rd, 35th, 38th and 39th districts of the New York City Council.

=== 2010s ===
The district includes portions of Brooklyn Heights, Downtown Brooklyn, Cobble Hill, Carroll Gardens, Gowanus, Park Slope, Boerum Hill, Red Hook, and DUMBO in Brooklyn. Grand Army Plaza is located within this district.

== Recent election results ==
=== 2026 ===
2026 New York State Assembly election, District 52
Primary election
| Party | Candidate | Votes | % |
|---|---|---|---|
| Democratic | Jo Anne Simon (incumbent) | 18,259 | 71.0 |
| Democratic | Lydia Green | 7,333 | 28.5 |
| Write-in | | 125 | 0.5 |
| Total votes | | 25,716 | 100.0 |
General election
| Democratic | Jo Anne Simon | | |
| Working Families | Jo Anne Simon | | |
| Total | Jo Anne Simon (incumbent) | | |
| Republican | Brett Wynkoop | | |
| Conservative | Brett Wynkoop | | |
| Total | Brett Wynkoop | | |
| Write-in | | | |
| Total votes | | | 100.0 |

=== 2024 ===
2024 New York State Assembly election, District 52
Primary election
| Party | Candidate | Votes | % |
|---|---|---|---|
| Democratic | Jo Anne Simon (incumbent) | 9,536 | 79.2 |
| Democratic | Scott Budow | 2,453 | 20.4 |
| Write-in | | 58 | 0.4 |
| Total votes | | 12,047 | 100.0 |
General election
| Democratic | Jo Anne Simon | 51,326 | |
| Working Families | Jo Anne Simon | 9,432 | |
| Total | Jo Anne Simon (incumbent) | 60,758 | 93.9 |
| Conservative | Brett Wynkoop | 3,785 | 5.8 |
| Write-in | | 176 | 0.3 |
| Total votes | | 64,719 | 100.0 |
| Democratic hold | | | |

=== 2022 ===
2022 New York State Assembly election, District 52
| Party | Candidate | Votes | % |
|---|---|---|---|
| Democratic | Jo Anne Simon | 37,985 | |
| Working Families | Jo Anne Simon | 3,792 | |
| Total | Jo Anne Simon (incumbent) | 48,463 | 91.9 |
| Republican | Brett Wynkoop | 3,792 | |
| Conservative | Brett Wynkoop | 341 | |
| Total | Brett Wynkoop | 4,173 | 7.9 |
| Write-in | | 87 | 0.2 |
| Total votes | | 52,723 | 100.0 |
| Democratic hold | | | |

=== 2020 ===
2020 New York State Assembly election, District 52
| Party | Candidate | Votes | % |
|---|---|---|---|
| Democratic | Jo Anne Simon | 51,320 | |
| Working Families | Jo Anne Simon | 16,062 | |
| Total | Jo Anne Simon (incumbent) | 67,382 | 99.5 |
| Write-in | | 342 | 0.5 |
| Total votes | | 67,724 | 100.0 |
| Democratic hold | | | |

=== 2018 ===
2018 New York State Assembly election, District 52
| Party | Candidate | Votes | % |
|---|---|---|---|
| Democratic | Jo Anne Simon | 48,656 | |
| Working Families | Jo Anne Simon | 7,653 | |
| Total | Jo Anne Simon (incumbent) | 56,309 | 95.4 |
| Conservative | Daniel Ramos | 1,988 | 3.4 |
| Libertarian | Gary Popkin | 667 | 1.1 |
| Write-in | | 56 | 0.1 |
| Total votes | | 59,020 | 100.0 |
| Democratic hold | | | |

=== 2016 ===
2016 New York State Assembly election, District 52
| Party | Candidate | Votes | % |
|---|---|---|---|
| Democratic | Jo Anne Simon | 50,716 | |
| Working Families | Jo Anne Simon | 5,664 | |
| Women's Equality | Jo Anne Simon | 1,198 | |
| Total | Jo Anne Simon (incumbent) | 57,578 | 91.7 |
| Republican | Daniel Ramos | 4,409 | |
| Conservative | Daniel Ramos | 737 | |
| Total | Daniel Ramos | 5,146 | 8.2 |
| Write-in | | 61 | 0.1 |
| Total votes | | 62,785 | 100.0 |
| Democratic hold | | | |

=== 2014 ===
2014 New York State Assembly election, District 52
Primary election
| Party | Candidate | Votes | % |
|---|---|---|---|
| Democratic | Jo Anne Simon | 5,882 | 52.9 |
| Democratic | Peter Sikora | 4,407 | 39.7 |
| Democratic | Douglas Biviano | 798 | 7.2 |
| Write-in | | 12 | 0.3 |
| Total votes | | 11,111 | 100.0 |
General election
| Democratic | Jo Anne Simon | 18,421 | 69.7 |
| Working Families | Peter Sikora | 5,843 | 22.1 |
| Republican | John Jasilli | 1,689 | |
| Conservative | John Jasilli | 458 | |
| Total | John Jasilli | 2,147 | 8.1 |
| Write-in | | 28 | 0.1 |
| Total votes | | 26,439 | 100.0 |
| Democratic hold | | | |

=== 2012 ===
2012 New York State Assembly election, District 52
| Party | Candidate | Votes | % |
|---|---|---|---|
| Democratic | Joan Millman | 43,500 | |
| Working Families | Joan Millman | 5,765 | |
| Total | Joan Millman (incumbent) | 49,265 | 92.8 |
| Republican | John Nijhawan | 3,270 | |
| Conservative | John Nijhawan | 477 | |
| Total | John Nijhawan | 3,747 | 7.1 |
| Write-in | | 51 | 0.1 |
| Total votes | | 53,063 | 100.0 |
| Democratic hold | | | |

=== 2010 ===
2010 New York State Assembly election, District 52
Primary election
| Party | Candidate | Votes | % |
|---|---|---|---|
| Democratic | Joan Millman (incumbent) | 7,615 | 74.9 |
| Democratic | Douglas Biviano | 2,541 | 25.0 |
| Write-in | | 16 | 0.2 |
| Total votes | | 10,172 | 100.0 |
General election
| Democratic | Joan Millman | 24,001 | |
| Working Families | Joan Millman | 7,440 | |
| Total | Joan Millman (incumbent) | 31,441 | 90.4 |
| Republican | John Jasilli Jr. | 2,803 | |
| Conservative | John Jasilli Jr. | 489 | |
| Total | John Jasilli Jr. | 3,292 | 9.5 |
| Write-in | | 29 | 0.1 |
| Total votes | | 34,762 | 100.0 |
| Democratic hold | | | |

=== 2008 ===
2008 New York State Assembly election, District 52
| Party | Candidate | Votes | % |
|---|---|---|---|
| Democratic | Joan Millman | 42,629 | |
| Working Families | Joan Millman | 5,075 | |
| Total | Joan Millman (incumbent) | 47,704 | 91.8 |
| Republican | Pedro Monge | 3,885 | |
| Conservative | Pedro Monge | 387 | |
| Total | Pedro Monge | 4,272 | 8.2 |
| Write-in | | 3 | 0.0 |
| Total votes | | 51,979 | 100.0 |
| Democratic hold | | | |

=== 2006 ===
2006 New York State Assembly election, District 52
| Party | Candidate | Votes | % |
|---|---|---|---|
| Democratic | Joan Millman | 22,718 | |
| Working Families | Joan Millman | 7,352 | |
| Total | Joan Millman (incumbent) | 30,070 | 92.5 |
| Republican | Rosemarie Markgraf | 2,059 | |
| Conservative | Rosemarie Markgraf | 379 | |
| Total | Rosemarie Markgraf | 2,438 | 7.5 |
| Write-in | | 2 | 0.0 |
| Total votes | | 32,510 | 100.0 |
| Democratic hold | | | |

=== 2004 ===
2004 New York State Assembly election, District 52
| Party | Candidate | Votes | % |
|---|---|---|---|
| Democratic | Joan Millman | 37,760 | |
| Working Families | Joan Millman | 5,551 | |
| Total | Joan Millman (incumbent) | 43,311 | 89.7 |
| Republican | Scott Santandrea | 4,053 | 8.4 |
| Conservative | Anne Marie Coffey | 853 | 1.8 |
| Write-in | | 91 | 0.2 |
| Total votes | | 48,308 | 100.0 |
| Democratic hold | | | |

=== 2002 ===
2002 New York State Assembly election, District 52
| Party | Candidate | Votes | % |
|---|---|---|---|
| Democratic | Joan Millman | 18,206 | |
| Working Families | Joan Millman | 3,827 | |
| Total | Joan Millman (incumbent) | 22,033 | 88.4 |
| Green | Kenn Lowy | 2,132 | 8.6 |
| Conservative | Rosemarie Markgraf | 761 | 3.1 |
| Write-in | | 2 | 0.0 |
| Total votes | | 24,926 | 100.0 |
| Democratic hold | | | |

=== 2000 ===
2000 New York State Assembly election, District 52
| Party | Candidate | Votes | % |
|---|---|---|---|
| Democratic | Joan Millman | 27,347 | |
| Liberal | Joan Millman | 1,188 | |
| Total | Joan Millman (incumbent) | 28,535 | 76.4 |
| Republican | Veronica Pawson | 7,473 | |
| Conservative | Veronica Pawson | 947 | |
| Total | Veronica Pawson | 8,420 | 22.6 |
| Independence | Charles Knapp | 379 | 1.0 |
| Write-in | | 2 | 0.0 |
| Total votes | | 37,336 | 100.0 |
| Democratic hold | | | |

=== Federal results in Assembly District 52 ===
| Year | Office | Results |
|---|---|---|
| 2024 | President | Harris 89.9 - 7.9% |
| 2024 | Senate | Gillibrand 90.8 - 8.2% |
| 2022 | Senate | Schumer 92.1 - 7.3% |
| 2020 | President | Biden 92.7 - 6.0% |
| 2018 | Senate | Gillibrand 94.6 - 5.3% |
| 2016 | President | Clinton 91.2 - 5.3% |
| 2016 | Senate | Schumer 90.0 - 6.2% |
| 2012 | President | Obama 91.7 - 6.3% |
| 2012 | Senate | Gillibrand 90.0 - 8.1% |
