= Anthony Miranda =

American police officer (born 1961)

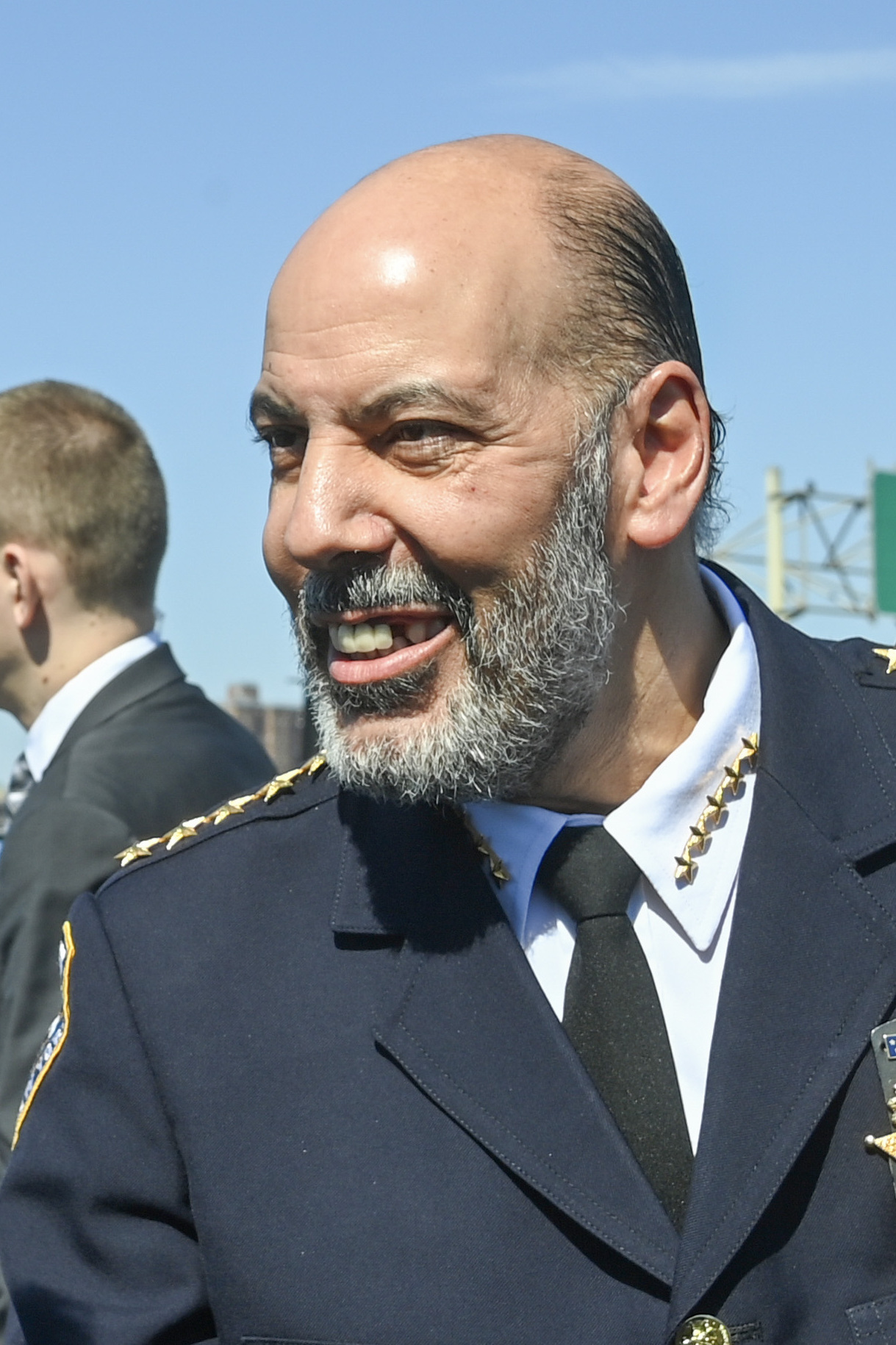
- Succeeded by: Edwin Raymond

Sheriff of New York City
- In office May 4, 2022 – May 29, 2026
- Mayor: Eric Adams; Zohran Mamdani
- Commissioner: Preston Niblack
- Preceded by: Joseph Fucito

Personal details
- Born: April 8, 1961 (age 65) Brooklyn, New York, U.S.
- Spouse: Sylvia Miranda
- Children: 3
- Education: John Jay College (BS)

Anthony Miranda (born April 8, 1961) is an American police officer who held the office of New York City Sheriff from 2022 until May 29, 2026. Part of former mayor Eric Adams's administration, he also has ties to state senator Hiram Monserrate.

== Career ==
Miranda was a sergeant and detective in the New York City Police Department. After retiring from the NYPD, he co-founded and served as the executive chairman of the National Latino Officers Association. In 2006, he founded a security, investigations, and consulting firm. In 2017 he was hired by the Administration for Children's Services as the director of security.

=== Candidacies ===
Miranda ran for Queens Borough President in 2020, but dropped out of the race after coming in fourth place in the Democratic primary. The following year, Miranda ran to represent District 20 in the New York City Council, but ranked 5th in the primary and did not proceed. During his 2021 campaign for New York City sheriff, Miranda personally loaned his campaign $11,000, which it repaid with $1,320 in interest, sparking some controversy.

=== New York City Sheriff ===
He was appointed Sheriff in May 2022 by Mayor Eric Adams. Earlier in 2022 he promoted a "virus buster" badge purported, without scientific evidence, to protect against COVID-19. Miranda's first year as sheriff was marked by a crackdown on unlicensed cannabis sales.

The deputy sheriffs union made 13 complaints against Miranda across 2023 and 2024. Those complaints included allegations of discrimination and retaliation against union members, as well as nepotism, in particular when an official fired from the Department of Correction was hired as Chief of Investigators with an $180,000 salary. The union said the executive salary would be better spent hiring more deputies. In June 2024, the union called on Miranda to resign, saying he had created a hostile work environment. Miranda was also accused of repeatedly using the lights and sirens of his department vehicle to get through rush-hour traffic and sometimes to escort his son to his job.

Miranda, like other members of the Adams administration, faced investigation in 2024. The head of the deputies union and raided businesses made allegations that cash seized during cannabis raids was being mishandled. On September 26, 2024, Miranda's office was raided by the Department of Investigation and a large amount of money was removed. Miranda stated that the NYPD was responsible for cash seized during investigations, not the Sheriff's Office.

On May 28, 2026, Miranda was removed from his position by Mayor Zohran Mamdani.

=== Ongoing probe ===
In July 2026, after Miranda was replaced as Sheriff, federal subpoenas were served upon several associates of Miranda, and raids conducted on Miranda's property in Puerto Rico. According to the New York Times, subpoenas mentioned possible "federal program fraud or bribery, wire fraud, money laundering, witness tampering and interstate travel in aid of racketeering" and were seeking records related to British American Tobacco and two of its subsidiaries, Reynolds American and R.J. Reynolds Tobacco Company. The New York City Sheriff's Office collects tobacco taxes and investigates tobacco-related crimes in New York City.

== See also ==
- https://ballotpedia.org/Anthony_Miranda
- https://ballotpedia.org/Municipal_elections_in_Queens_County,_New_York_(2020)
