= Jo Anne Simon =

American politician

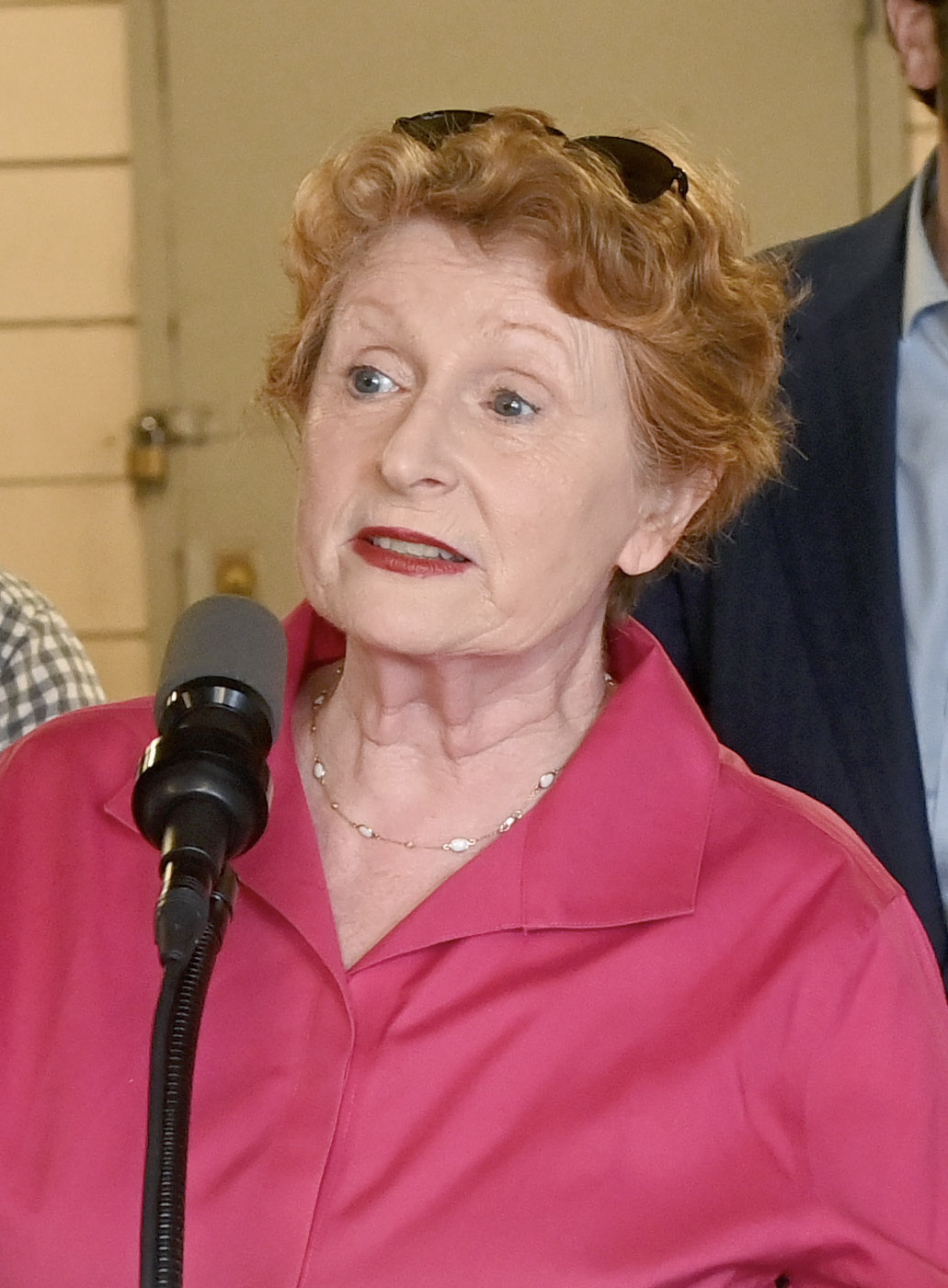
- Simon in 2023

Member of the New York State Assembly from the 52nd district
- Incumbent
- Assumed office January 1, 2015
- Preceded by: Joan Millman

Personal details
- Born: October 6, 1952 (age 74) Yonkers, New York, U.S.
- Party: Democratic
- Spouse: Bill Harris
- Education: Iona College (BA); Gallaudet University (MA); Fordham University (JD)
- Website: State Assembly website

Jo Anne Simon (born 1952) is an American attorney and politician serving as a member of the New York State Assembly for the 52nd District. She is a Democrat. The district includes portions of Brooklyn Heights, Downtown Brooklyn, Cobble Hill, Carroll Gardens, Gowanus, Park Slope, Boerum Hill and DUMBO in Brooklyn. She was a candidate for Congress in New York's newly redrawn 10th congressional district in 2022.

== Early life and education ==
Simon was born in Yonkers, New York. A first-generation college student, she earned a Bachelor of Arts degree from Iona College. She later earned a Master of Arts degree from Gallaudet University, and a Juris Doctor from the Fordham University School of Law.

== Career ==
After graduating from law school, Simon established a disability civil rights law firm in Downtown Brooklyn. She also worked as an adjunct assistant professor of law at Fordham University. A resident of Brooklyn for nearly forty years, Simon formerly served as the president of the Boerum Hill Association before being elected to the New York State Assembly. In 2014, she was elected district leader and state committeewoman for the 52nd Assembly district.

Simon helped passed landmark reforms to the power structure of the Brooklyn borough Democratic Party by opening the semi-annual meetings to the public and eliminating unilateral control of the King's County machine away from the county leader. There is more transparency of The Kings County Democratic Party as of 2013.

On October 1, 2020, Simon announced her candidacy for Brooklyn Borough President in front of James Madison High School as a tribute to Ruth Bader Ginsburg. If she had been elected, she would have been the first woman to hold the office; she finished in second place, behind City Council member Antonio Reynoso.

In August 2022, Simon lost the Democratic Primary for the newly created NY-10 Congressional District to Dan Goldman. Goldman also defeated Yuh-Line Niou, Mondaire Jones, Carlina Rivera, Elizabeth Holtzman, Maud Maron, Yan Xiong, Jimmy Li, Quanda Francis, Peter Gleason, and Brian Robinson in this primary election.

=== New York Assembly ===
In 2014, nine-term Assemblywoman Joan Millman announced she would retire. Soon after, Simon announced she would enter the race to succeed her. In a three-way primary, Simon secured over 53% of the vote and won the general election with 69% of the vote.

Simon was sworn into office on January 1, 2015. In the Assembly, she serves as the Chair of the Committee on Mental Health.

== Personal life ==
Simon is married to Bill Harris and resides in Boerum Hill.
