= Diana Reyna =

American politician (born 1974)

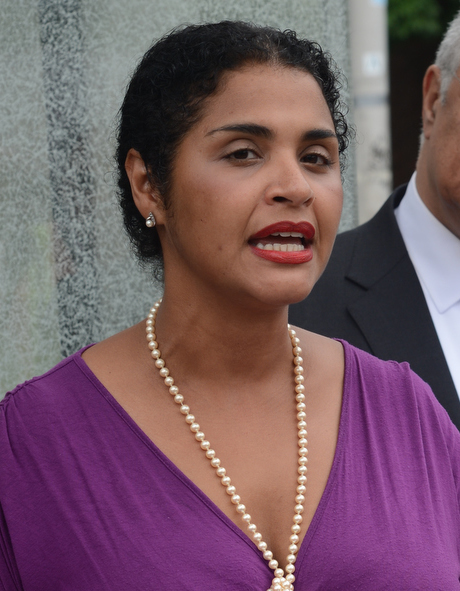

Deputy Borough President of Brooklyn
- In office January 1, 2014 – December 31, 2018
- Borough President: Eric Adams
- Preceded by: Yvonne Graham
- Succeeded by: Ingrid Lewis-Martin

Member of the New York City Council from the 34th district
- In office January 1, 2002 – December 31, 2013
- Preceded by: Victor L. Robles
- Succeeded by: Antonio Reynoso

Personal details
- Born: November 23, 1973 (age 52) New York City, U.S.
- Party: Democratic
- Education: Pace University (BA)

Diana Reyna (born November 23, 1973) is an American politician who was the deputy borough president for Brooklyn and a member of the New York City Council from the 34th District, which includes Williamsburg and Bushwick as well as Ridgewood in Queens. Reyna ran for lieutenant governor of New York in the 2022 election as U.S. Representative Tom Suozzi's running mate.

== Early life and education ==
Reyna was born and raised in New York City. She attended the now-closed Our Savior School (the former parochial school of Transfiguration Roman Catholic Church) in Williamsburg, Saint Joseph High School in downtown Brooklyn, and Pace University in Pleasantville, New York.

== Political career ==
Reyna was a member of the New York City Council from 2002 to 2013. She was the first Dominican American woman elected to public office in New York State. Previously, she was the chief of staff to the New York State Assembly member and chairman of the Kings County (Brooklyn) Democratic Party, Vito Lopez. They have since had a very public falling-out, culminating in Lopez running an unsuccessful candidate, Maritza Davila, against Reyna in the 2009 primary and general election. Reyna was prevented by term limits from running for re-election to the city council in 2013; Lopez attempted to succeed her, but lost in the primary to Antonio Reynoso.

Reyna worked in the office of the Brooklyn borough president Eric Adams as a deputy borough president.

Reyna ran for lieutenant governor of New York on a ticket with the candidate for governor Thomas Suozzi. Her successful opponents on primary day were Ana Maria Archila and Antonio Delgado.

== Legislative and councilmanic focus and positions ==
As a council member, Reyna concentrated her efforts in funding youth programs and family literacy as well as fighting crime and reducing gang violence in her council district.

In 2007, the New York City Council passed a bill that Reyna had sponsored, which amended the administrative code of the city of New York in relation to increasing fines for illegal conversions from industrial to residential uses. The bill was later signed into law by Mayor Bloomberg.

Reyna voted in favor of the extension of term limits to allow for a third term for the mayor and city council.

Reyna voted against a modified version of Mayor Bloomberg's congestion pricing plan.

New York City Council
Preceded by Victor L. Robles	Member of the New York City Council from the 34th district 2002–2013	Succeeded by Antonio Reynoso
