= Shanduke McPhatter =

American community activist

- Born: Brooklyn, New York
- Years active: 2008–present
- Known for: Founder of Gangstas Making Astronomical Community Changes (GMACC)
- Website: gangstamackin.com

Shanduke McPhatter is a community leader based in Brooklyn, New York City. He is the founder and chief executive officer of Gangstas Making Astronomical Community Change (GMACC), a non-profit organization that focuses on gun violence prevention and social justice issues. He is a reformed Bloods gang leader.

== Life and career ==
McPhatter grew up in public housing in Boerum Hill, Brooklyn. His mother raised him, but he never knew his father. McPhatter was first arrested at age 16 for a strong-arm mugging. A few years after that, he spent his first stint in jail for allegedly robbing a store, although he has continually maintained his innocence in that case. He took a three-year plea deal in 1996 in that matter to avoid the possibility of a 15-year prison sentence. While imprisoned at Rikers Island, he joined the Bloods gang. He also adopted the name "Trife Gangsta". McPhatter would later spend time in Comstock Correctional Facility, Clinton Correctional Facility, and Elmira Correctional Facility on a variety of robbery, drug-related and other convictions.

In 1999, he earned a job as a security guard, working with a company until 2001, when it was discovered they were in violation of a state law prohibiting convicted felons from working as security guards. He went back to selling drugs at that time in Gowanus, Brooklyn. He formulated the plans for his non-profit organization, Gangstas Making Astronomical Community Changes (GMACC), while still behind bars. He also earned his GED while in prison.

After his release, McPhatter began canvassing Brooklyn neighborhoods with other residents and Brooklyn council member, Jumaane Williams, to combat gun violence. Williams advocated for GMACC, partially because its programs were similar to the Cure Violence program in use throughout the city. This eventually led to GMACC receiving government funding. In 2015, GMACC opened its first headquarters at a location in East Flatbush. McPhatter helped open a second GMACC office in Fort Greene in January 2019. In addition to organizing marches against gun violence, the organization also offers mental health counseling, job training, conflict mediation, educational resources, and mentorship (among other services). New York City officials credited the organization for a 30% reduction in gun crime in its precinct between 2012 and 2017.
