= Sandy Nurse =

American politician

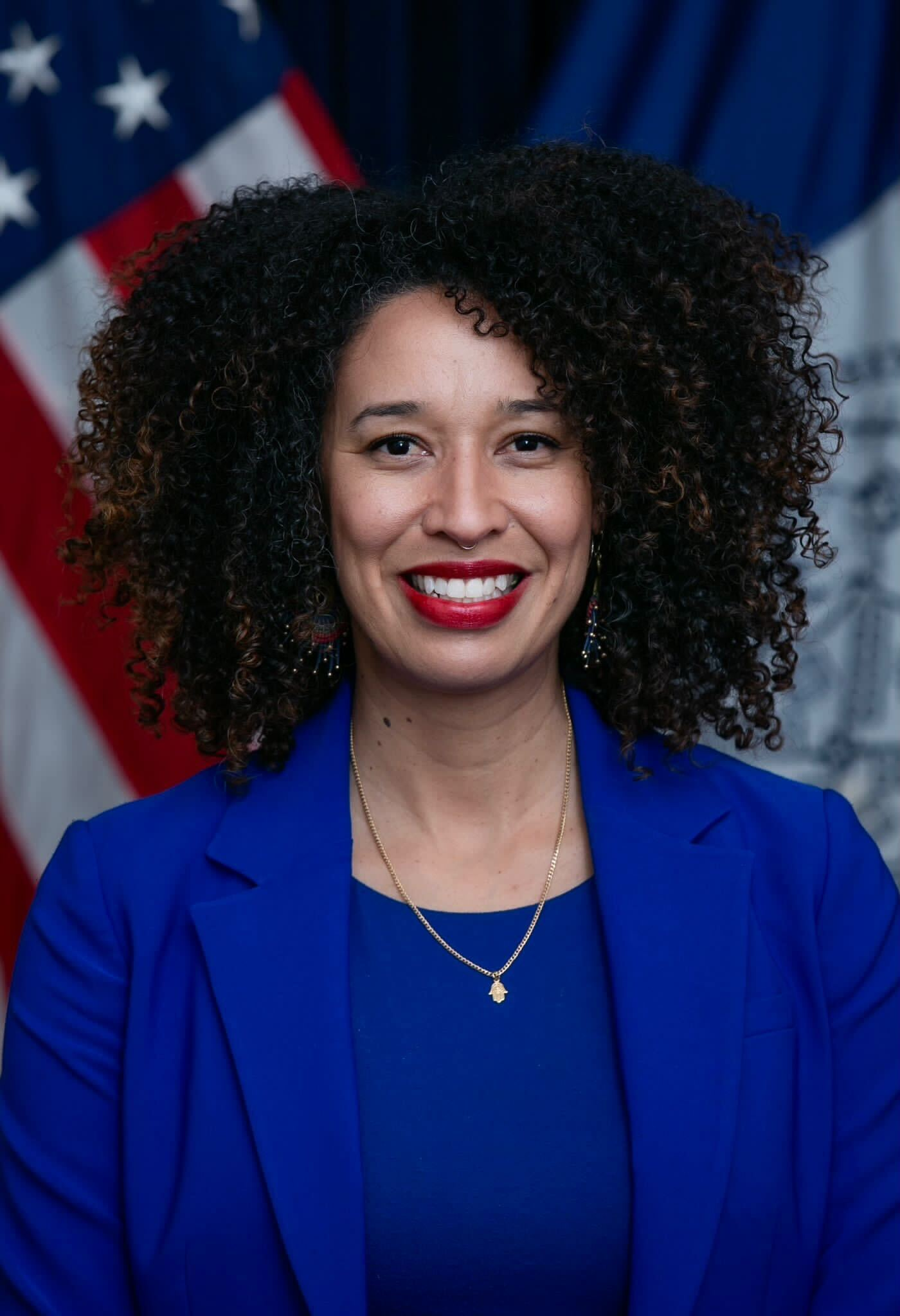
- Official portrait, 2024

Member of the New York City Council from the 37th district
- Incumbent
- Assumed office January 1, 2022
- Preceded by: Darma Diaz

Personal details
- Born: April 3, 1984 (age 42) Panama
- Party: Democratic
- Education: Emmanuel College (BA); The New School
- Website: Official website Campaign website

Sandra Nurse (born April 3, 1984) is an American Democratic politician from New York City who has served as the New York City Council member for the 37th district since 2022. District 37 covers Bushwick and other neighborhoods in northern Brooklyn.

== Early life and education ==
Nurse was born in Panama and raised by a White American mother and a Afro-Panamanian father both serving in the U.S. Navy. She grew up in Panama until she was around 5 years old, when the family moved to various military posts including Cuba, South Korea, and Japan before she settled in Bushwick, Brooklyn in 2009.

Nuse graduated from Emmanuel College in Boston with a bachelor’s degree in political science, which put her in student loan debt. She completed graduate studies at The New School.

== Career ==
Prior to her runs for political office, Nurse worked in a number of jobs and fields, including as a waitress, a food delivery worker, a janitor, a community organizer, and most prominently a carpenter. She is also the founder of the Brooklyn-based composting organization BK ROT and a cofounder of the Mayday Space, a venue for progressive organizations.

=== 2020 campaigns ===
In September 2019, Nurse announced that she would run for the 54th district of the New York State Assembly, challenging incumbent Democrat Erik Martin Dilan from the left. Nurse was one of two left-wing challengers in the race, alongside State Senator Julia Salazar's chief of staff, Boris Santos.

However, after City Councilmember Rafael Espinal resigned from the overlapping 37th district of the New York City Council in January 2020, Nurse chose to abandon her Assembly campaign and run in the special election to replace Espinal. Nurse was seen as one of two major candidates in the race alongside district leader Darma Diaz, who had the support of Espinal and was seen as the race's establishment candidate.

With the March arrival of the COVID-19 pandemic in New York City, the election took several unexpected turns. First, the planned April special election was suspended, then moved to June, and finally cancelled altogether in favor of a traditional primary and general election to be held in June and November. Governor Andrew Cuomo additionally decreed that, in light of the pandemic, the number of signatures required to make it onto the ballot would be significantly reduced – but the New York City Board of Elections ruled in April that the new requirements would not apply to the special election, leaving every candidate but Diaz short of the necessary number of signatures and thus barred from the ballot. Nurse fought the ruling and argued that the Brooklyn Democratic Party had meddled to ensure a Diaz victory, but was unsuccessful in reinstating herself on the special election ballot. Diaz thus was able to win both the primary and general elections completely unopposed.

=== 2021 City Council campaign ===
In July 2020 – shortly after Diaz had won her special election primary – Nurse announced she would seek a rematch in the regularly scheduled 2021 City council election. As in the special election, Nurse ran a left-wing campaign, and received support from many of the city's most influential progressive officeholders and organizations, among them Congresswomen Alexandria Ocasio-Cortez and Nydia Velázquez, Public Advocate Jumaane Williams, and the Working Families Party.

On election night, Nurse comfortably led Diaz 51-24%, and acknowledged her likely victory on June 23; when absentee ballots and ranked-choice votes were counted two weeks later, she officially defeated Diaz by a ranked choice margin of 65-35%. Nurse subsequently won the general election with over 86% of the vote.

=== As Councilmember ===
In 2025, the City Council passed a bill Nurse authored that requires the city to expand availability of public restrooms.

In March 2026, Nurse said the top priority in her district was housing.

In May 2026, Nurse was present at the scene of a conflict in Bushwick between federal immigration officers and local protesters. She said that she witnessed what “appeared to be direct coordination between ICE and the NYPD, with officers cordoning off the ambulance bay to allow ICE to move the individual into their vehicles and leave.” This raised concerns that the NYPD had violated the city's sanctuary laws.

Nurse sits on the City Council's Progressive Caucus, serving as co-chair.

== Personal life ==
Nurse lives in Cypress Hills, Brooklyn. She identifies as Afro-Latina. In December 2023, her father, Guillermo Nurse, was sworn in as the first Latino mayor of Oxford, North Carolina.

== Electoral history ==
=== 2025 ===
2025 New York City Council election, District 37
Party	Candidate	Votes	%
Democratic	Sandy Nurse	21,175	74.6
Working Families	Sandy Nurse	7,068	24.9
Total	Sandy Nurse (incumbent)	28,243	99.5
Write-in		129	0.5
Total votes		28,372	100.0
Democratic hold			

=== 2023 ===
2023 New York City Council election, District 37
Party	Candidate	Votes	%
Democratic	Sandy Nurse	3,765	70.0
Working Families	Sandy Nurse	1,004	18.7
Total	Sandy Nurse (incumbent)	4,769	88.7
Republican	Isaiah Orlando Vega	461	8.6
Conservative	Isaiah Orlando Vega (Note: Shared with "Medical Freedom" ballot line.)	93	1.7
Total	Isaiah Orlando Vega	554	10.3
Write-in		55	1.0
Total votes		5,378	100.0
Democratic hold			

=== 2021 ===
2021 New York City Council Democratic primary, District 37
Party	Candidate	Maximum round	Maximum votes	Share in maximum round	Maximum votes First round votes Transfer votes
Democratic	Sandy Nurse	5	6,124	65.4%	
Democratic	Darma V. Diaz (incumbent)	5	3,247	34.6%	
Democratic	Misba Abdin	4	1,154	11.0%	
Democratic	Heriberto Mateo	4	1,071	10.2%	
Democratic	Rick Echevarria	2	558	5.1%	
Democratic	Christopher Durosinmi	2	340	3.1%	
Write-In		1	25	0.2%	

2021 New York City Council election, District 37
Party	Candidate	Votes	%
Democratic	Sandy Nurse	8,884	86.5
Republican	Franklin Gonzalez	1,369	13.3
Write-in		20	0.2
Total votes		10,273	100.0
Democratic hold			

== Notes ==
Political offices
Preceded by Darma Diaz	Member of the New York City Council from the 37th district 2022–present	Incumbent
