= Proprietism =

Proprietism is an economic system composed of a vast network of sole-proprietorships.

== Origins ==
The rise of an independent workforce was documented by Daniel H. Pink in his 2001 book Free Agent Nation: The Future of Working for Yourself. Depending on the precise definition of an independent worker, reports on the topic estimate this type of worker to be somewhere between thirty and forty percent of the entire workforce in the United States, and analysis of the data reveals the trend to be rising. The ideology and term proprietism originated in the blogosphere, initially in 2012 by Nick Wilson of proprietist.com and then was further developed from 2013 onward by Paul Kurke of proprietism.com. Sara Horowitz has also acknowledged the rise of independent contract workers, and has encouraged the movement by creating the Freelancers Union, a non-profit organization for free agents.

== Core Concepts ==
As in capitalism, the resources of a proprietist system are allocated through market forces, though proprietism differs from capitalism because the structure implies a more decentralized ownership of capital, similar to that of a company with an employee stock ownership plan. According to Kurke, proprietism has the potential to resolve the principal-agent problem by structurally realigning productivity and innovation with compensation, assuming advances in information systems continue. Kurke argues that proprietism already exists in the zeitgeist, especially among millennials.

== See also ==
- Distributism
