= Christian Celeste Tate =

American politician

- Tate in 2024

Member-elect of the New York State Assembly from the 54th district
- Assuming office January 2027
- Succeeding: Erik Martin Dilan

Personal details
- Party: Democratic
- Other political affiliations: Democratic Socialists of America (Note: The Democratic Socialists of America (DSA) are not a registered political party. Instead, they are a political organization for those with democratic socialist ideologies.)
- Education: Bowdoin College (BA)

Christian Celeste Tate is an American politician. A member of the New York City Democratic Socialists of America, he is the member-elect for the 54th district of the New York Assembly which comprises the Brooklyn neighborhoods of Bushwick, Cypress Hills, East New York, Ocean Hill, and Brownsville.

== Early life, education, and early career ==
Tate was raised in Washington, D.C. His grandfather, Vincent Celeste, was the Republican candidate for the 1958 United States Senate election in Massachusetts, losing to future U.S. president John F. Kennedy. He studied from Bowdoin College, where he worked as an intern at the White House and FairVote.

He has worked extensively as a community organizer and in the non-profit sector, for organizations like The Bridgespan Group, Womankind, Day One, and Brooklyn's Community Board 4. Tate also campaigned for fellow Democratic Socialist and mayor-elect of New York City, Zohran Mamdani.

Tate ran against Erik Martin Dilan, the representative for New York's 54th State Assembly district, in the 2026 election. His campaign came amidst concern about Dilan's lack of public appearances in the district. Tate raised $62,500 during his campaign, though Dilan maintained the cash advantage in the primary. He was endorsed by the Senator Bernie Sanders, Representative Alexandria Ocasio-Cortez, and several New York City Council members, as well as the Democratic Socialists of America.

Tate won the primary election, defeating Dilan with 60% of the vote. Tate told City & State that "the notifications had been going crazy" one morning shortly after he won the primary. He later won the general election with 99.5% of the vote, without any non-write-in opposition.

Tate is a member of New York City Democratic Socialists of America.
