= Mutualism (movement) =

Social movement

Mutualism, also known as the movement of mutuals and the mutualist movement, is a social movement that aims at creating and promoting mutual organizations, mutual insurances and mutual funds. According to the prominent mutualist Gene Costa, the movement encourages and assists the provision of mutual benefits against risks to those accessing its funds and or the elevation of their material and spiritual living standards by regular payment or contribution. Institutionalized through mutual funds, mutualism has been universally recognized as a generator or embryo of classical forecast and modern social security systems and currently coexists with them. Although the fall in the popularity of mutual funds in many social environments coincided with the start of public social security system in the early decades of the 20th century, in Europe and other parts of the world mutualism continues to be an important player in the social economy. Mutuals providing healthcare coverage are united in an international association of benefit societies.

Mutualism and mutual aid were extolled by reformers Peter Kropotkin and Frank Parsons. The mutualist movement adapted such ideas and the concepts of guild system of the 18th century (see guild and mount of piety). Widespread in the late 19th century, today there are many mutualist associations worldwide integrated into modern society.

Nowadays, mutualism is linked to financial firms, insurers, unions, entities to promote solidarity economics, trade associations and religious movements. The characteristic sign of mutual movement is its institutional neutrality about political, religious, racial and union affiliations of its members. Mutuals movement and cooperatives movement have many points in common, around the idea of professional mutual aid.

Building on the mutualist movement of the 18th and 19th centuries, Sara Horowitz, founder and executive director of Freelancers Union, has identified several related phenomena that she calls "new mutualism". For example, Horowitz and Costa applaud the 40 million Americans currently freelancing as an example of entrepreneurship among the middle class.
