= Darma Diaz =

American politician

Member of the New York City Council from the 37th district
- In office September 14, 2021 – December 31, 2021
- Preceded by: Rafael Espinal
- Succeeded by: Sandy Nurse

Personal details
- Born: August 5, 1968 (age 58) Brooklyn, New York, U.S.
- Party: Democratic
- Education: Boricua College (BA)
- Website: Official website

Darma V. Diaz (born August 5, 1968) is a Democratic politician. She is a former New York City Councilmember for the 37th district, which includes Bushwick, East New York, Cypress Hills, Ocean Hill-Brownsville, and Brownsville, Brooklyn. A member of the Democratic Party, she was elected unopposed in December 2020 following the resignation of Rafael Espinal. Diaz presided as Chair of the New York City Council's Committee on Women and Gender Equity.

== Personal life ==
Diaz was born in Brooklyn, New York. Her parents are both Puerto Rican Americans; her father was a veteran and her mother a small business owner in North Brooklyn. She has one adult child, Alisson N. Diaz, who works as a law enforcement Peace Officer in New York City. After receiving a Bachelor's in Human Services at Boricua College, Diaz pursued a career in community organizing and social work.

== Early career ==
Prior to her tenure on the New York City Council, Diaz had accumulated more than four decades' worth of experience in community and public service, including a brief stint where she worked as a staffer for then Assemblyman Darryl Towns. As a young mother, Diaz was a victim of spousal abuse and was temporarily homeless. In the twelve years leading up to her 2020 campaign for City Council, Diaz worked as a social worker for OverComing Love Ministry, where she assisted families experiencing homelessness with finding housing and employment.

== New York City Council ==
=== 2009 election ===
After working for Towns for ten years, Diaz filed to run for City Council in 2009. After being challenged for insufficient signatures, she ultimately did not make the ballot.

=== 2020 election ===
Diaz filed to run for the District 37 special election, following the resignation of Councilmember Rafael Espinal. A nonpartisan special election was scheduled for April to fill the vacancy for the remainder of his term. A primary election was also scheduled to take place in June to nominate candidates for the November general election; the winner of which would take office in 2021.

Among the hopefuls for the special election were Diaz, former State Assembly candidate Sandy Nurse, founder of Bangladeshi American Community Development & Youth Service Misba Abdin, and former City Council candidate Kimberly Council. Another candidate, Rick Echevarria, a former administration official for mayor Bill de Blasio, opted to skip the special election in favor of preparing for the June primary.

Due to concerns over COVID-19 in March and April, Mayor de Blasio and Governor Andrew Cuomo first postponed, and then canceled, the special general election scheduled for late April. The competition for the remaining June primary only grew more embattled from there as a subsequent executive order from the governor's office lowered the number of signatures each candidate would require to get on the state's ballot by 70%, meaning candidates would only need to gather 135 valid signatures to run for City Council instead of 450. In response, the city's Board of Elections ruled that the reduction wouldn't apply to the District 37 race.

A volley of legal challenges ensued. Although a Kings County Supreme Court judge reversed the Board of Elections' decision and ordered that the candidates who had reached the lower threshold be allowed to compete with Diaz, a late-April decision by the state court Appellate Division led to the other candidates being dropped from the ballot again. Ultimately, this decision held, and Diaz was left to run unopposed in both the June primary and November general elections.

=== 2021 election ===
In the June 2021 Democratic primary, three of the candidates who were dropped in the 2020 election ran against Diaz for her seat on the council. While Diaz was well-backed by the Brooklyn Democratic Party, she faced intense criticism over the manner in which she was elected in 2020. Some alleged that the "party machine" was behind getting her opponents kicked off the 2020 ballot. At a virtual candidate forum in February, Diaz accused Sandy Nurse of "switching" racial identifies, stating “How do you have the right to say, ‘I’m Afro-American today, and tomorrow I’m Latina.’ The conversations are different.” She was ultimately defeated in the Democratic primary by Nurse.
