= New York City's 37th City Council district =

- Boundaries following the 2020 census

Government
  - Councilmember: . Sandy Nurse. D–Cypress Hills

Population (2010)
  - Total: 158,438

Demographics
  - Hispanic: 56%
  - Black: 30%
  - Asian: 6%
  - White: 4%
  - Other: 4%

Registration
  - Democratic: 75.0%
  - Republican: 4.7%
  - No party preference: 17.7%
- Registered voters (2021) 96,282

New York City's 37th City Council district is one of 51 districts in the New York City Council. It is currently represented by Democrat Sandy Nurse, who took office in 2022.

== Geography ==
District 37 covers a series of majority-Hispanic neighborhoods along Brooklyn's northern border, including a large swath of Bushwick as well as Ocean Hill, Cypress Hills, City Line, and small parts of East New York and Brownsville.

The district overlaps with Brooklyn Community Boards 4, 5, and 16, and with New York's 7th and 8th congressional districts. It also overlaps with the 18th, 19th, and 25th districts of the New York State Senate, and with the 53rd, 54th, 55th, and 60th districts of the New York State Assembly.

== Members representing the district ==
Members	Party	Years served	Electoral history
District established January 1, 1992
Martin M. Dilan (Cypress Hills)	Democratic	January 1, 1992 – December 31, 2001	Elected in 1991. Re-elected in 1993. Re-elected in 1997. Termed out and ran New York State Senate.
Erik M. Dilan (Cypress Hills)	Democratic	January 1, 2002 – December 31, 2013	Elected in 2001. Re-elected in 2003. Re-elected in 2005. Re-elected in 2009. Termed out and ran for U.S. House of Representatives.
Rafael Espinal (Cypress Hills)	Democratic	January 1, 2014 – January 26, 2020	Elected in 2013. Re-elected in 2017. Resigned.
Vacant		January 26, 2020 – November 4, 2020	
Darma Diaz (Cypress Hills)	Democratic	November 4, 2020 – December 31, 2021	Elected to finish Espinal's term. Lost renomination.
Sandy Nurse (Cypress Hills)	Democratic	January 1, 2022 – current	Elected in 2021. Re-elected in 2023. Re-elected in 2025.

== Recent election results ==
=== 2025 ===
2025 New York City Council election, District 37
Party	Candidate	Votes	%
Democratic	Sandy Nurse	21,175	
Working Families	Sandy Nurse	7,068	
Total	Sandy Nurse (incumbent)	28,243	99.5
Write-in		129	0.5
Total votes		28,372	100.0

=== 2023 (redistricting) ===
Due to redistricting and the 2020 changes to the New York City Charter, councilmembers elected during the 2021 and 2023 City Council elections will serve two-year terms, with full four-year terms resuming after the 2025 New York City Council elections.

2023 New York City Council election, District 37
Party	Candidate	Votes	%
Democratic	Sandy Nurse	3,765	
Working Families	Sandy Nurse	1,004	
Total	Sandy Nurse (incumbent)	4,769	88.7
Republican	Isaiah Vega	461	
Conservative	Isaiah Vega	93	
Total	Isaiah Vega	554	10.3
Write-in		55	1.0
Total votes		5,378	100.0
Democratic hold			

=== 2021 ===
In 2019, voters in New York City approved Ballot Question 1, which implemented ranked-choice voting in all local elections. Under the new system, voters have the option to rank up to five candidates for every local office. Voters whose first-choice candidates fare poorly will have their votes redistributed to other candidates in their ranking until one candidate surpasses the 50 percent threshold. If one candidate surpasses 50 percent in first-choice votes, then ranked-choice tabulations will not occur.

2021 New York City Council election, District 37 Democratic primary
Party	Candidate	Maximum round	Maximum votes	Share in maximum round	Maximum votes First round votes Transfer votes
Democratic	Sandy Nurse	5	6,124	65.4%	
Democratic	Darma Diaz (incumbent)	5	3,247	34.6%	
Democratic	Misba Abdin	4	1,154	11.0%	
Democratic	Heriberto Mateo	4	1,071	10.2%	
Democratic	Rick Echevarria	2	558	5.1%	
Democratic	Chris Durosinmi	2	340	3.1%	
Write-in		1	25	0.2%	

An interactive map of District 37

2021 New York City Council election, District 37 general election
Party	Candidate	Votes	%
Democratic	Sandy Nurse	8,884	86.4
Republican	Franklin Gonzalez	1,369	13.3
Write-in		20	0.2
Total votes		10,273	100
Democratic hold			

=== 2020 special ===
In January 2020, Councilman Rafael Espinal resigned in order to take a job with the Freelancers Union, leaving his seat vacant. An April special election was called, but due to the onset of the COVID-19 pandemic, it was moved to align with the concurrent 2020 elections. While the election initially appeared to be a competitive contest between Darma Diaz, Sandy Nurse, and several other candidates, a complex series of judicial rulings and political maneuvers meant that all candidates but Diaz were removed from the ballot, and Diaz won both the primary and general elections uncontested.

2020 New York City Council special election, District 37
Party	Candidate	Votes	%
Democratic	Darma Diaz	37,228	99.4
Write-in		235	0.6
Total votes		37,463	100
Democratic hold			

=== 2017 ===
2017 New York City Council election, District 37
Party	Candidate	Votes	%
Democratic	Rafael Espinal (incumbent)	10,369	89.8
Green	Persephone Sarah Jane Smith	1,152	10.0
Write-in		20	0.2
Total votes		11,541	100
Democratic hold			

=== 2013 ===
2013 New York City Council election, District 37
Primary election
Party	Candidate	Votes	%
Democratic	Rafael Espinal	3,538	45.9
Democratic	Kimberly Council	2,459	31.9
Democratic	Heriberto Mateo	927	12.0
Democratic	Helal Sheikh	792	10.3
Write-in		0	0.0
Total votes		7,716	100
General election
Democratic	Rafael Espinal	9,058	86.1
Working Families	Kimberly Council	1,235	11.7
Conservative	Michael Freeman-Saulsberre	230	2.2
Write-in		4	0.0
Total votes		10,527	100
Democratic hold			
