= Thomas F. Catapano =

American politician (1949–2005)

Member of the New York State Assembly from the 54th district
- In office January 1, 1983 – December 31, 1992
- Preceded by: William F. Boyland
- Succeeded by: Darryl C. Towns

Personal details
- Born: August 16, 1949 Brooklyn, New York, U.S.
- Died: May 22, 2005 (aged 55)
- Party: Democratic

Thomas F. Catapano (August 16, 1949 – May 22, 2005) was an American politician who served in the New York State Assembly from the 54th district from 1983 to 1992.
