= Julia Salazar =

American politician

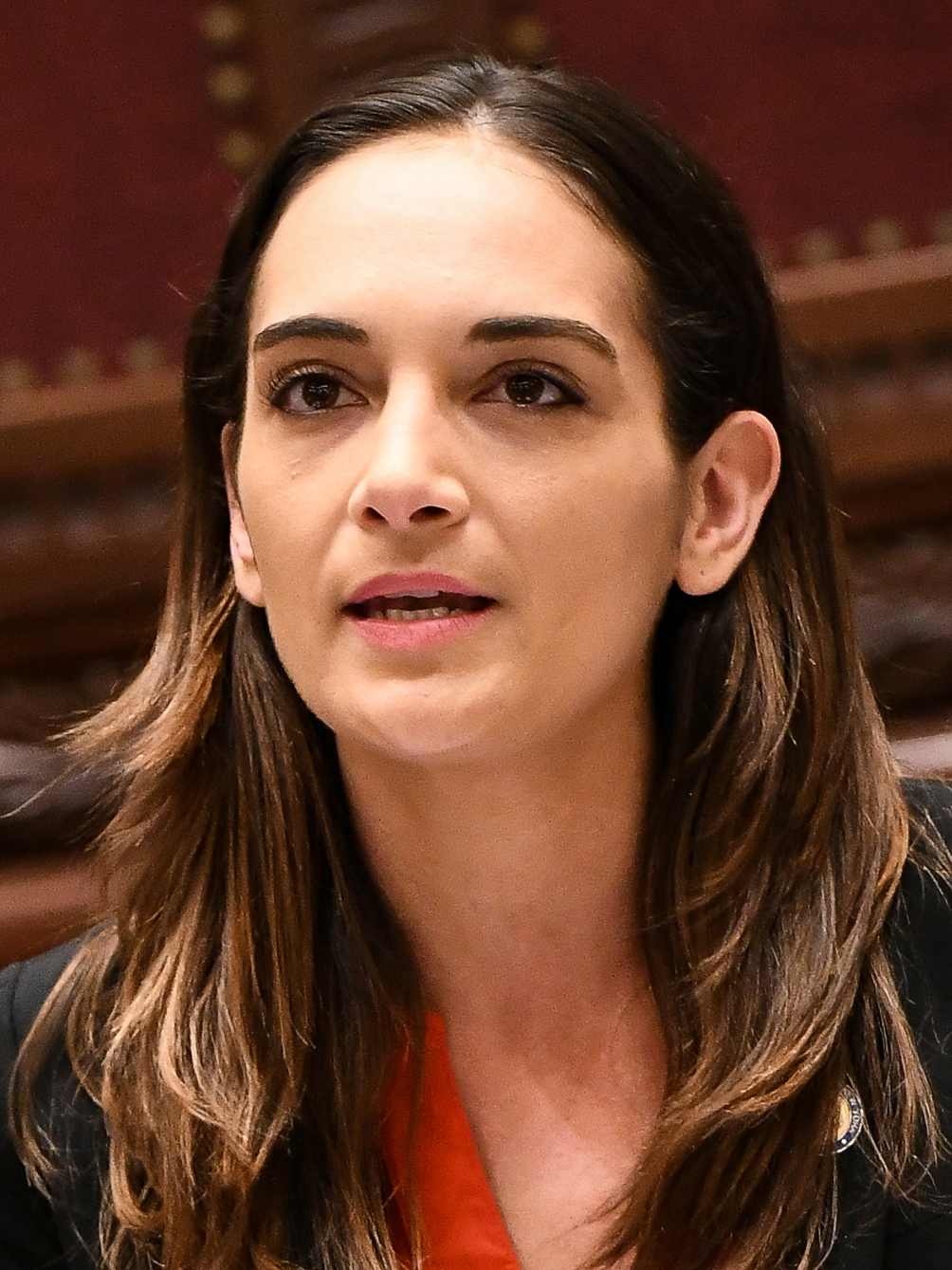
- Salazar in 2019

Member of the New York State Senate from the 18th district
- Incumbent
- Assumed office January 1, 2019
- Preceded by: Martin Malave Dilan

Personal details
- Born: December 30, 1990 (age 35) Miami, Florida, U.S.
- Party: Republican (2008–2010); Independence (2010); Democratic (2017–present)
- Other political affiliations: Democratic Socialists of America
- Education: Columbia University
- Website: State Senate website Campaign website

Julia Salazar (born December 30, 1990) is an American politician and activist. She is the New York State Senator for the 18th district, which covers much of northern Brooklyn, centered on Bushwick. She won the seat as a first-time candidate after unseating incumbent Senator Martin Malave Dilan in the Democratic Party primary in 2018. She attracted national media attention for her support for sex workers' rights and other views. A member of the Democratic Socialists of America, she became the first member of the organization to serve in New York's state legislature. Salazar was the first candidate (primary and general) and non-political office holder elected to the New York State Legislature who was endorsed by The Democratic Socialists of America prior to getting elected in the year 2018.

== Early life and education ==
Salazar was born in Miami on December 30, 1990. Her mother is an American citizen by birth, and her father a naturalized American citizen from Colombia. Her parents divorced during her childhood. Salazar was raised in a secular conservative home and at 18 registered as a Republican. In March 2010, she registered with the Independence Party of New York, believing it meant she was an independent voter.

Salazar attended Columbia University, but did not earn a degree. While there, Salazar was pro-life and a member of pro-Israel Christian student groups, but after a trip to Israel with Birthright Israel, her political views began to shift and she became involved in campus Jewish life and tenant organizing. After college, she became a grassroots organizer and campaigned extensively for legislation around police accountability.

== Career ==
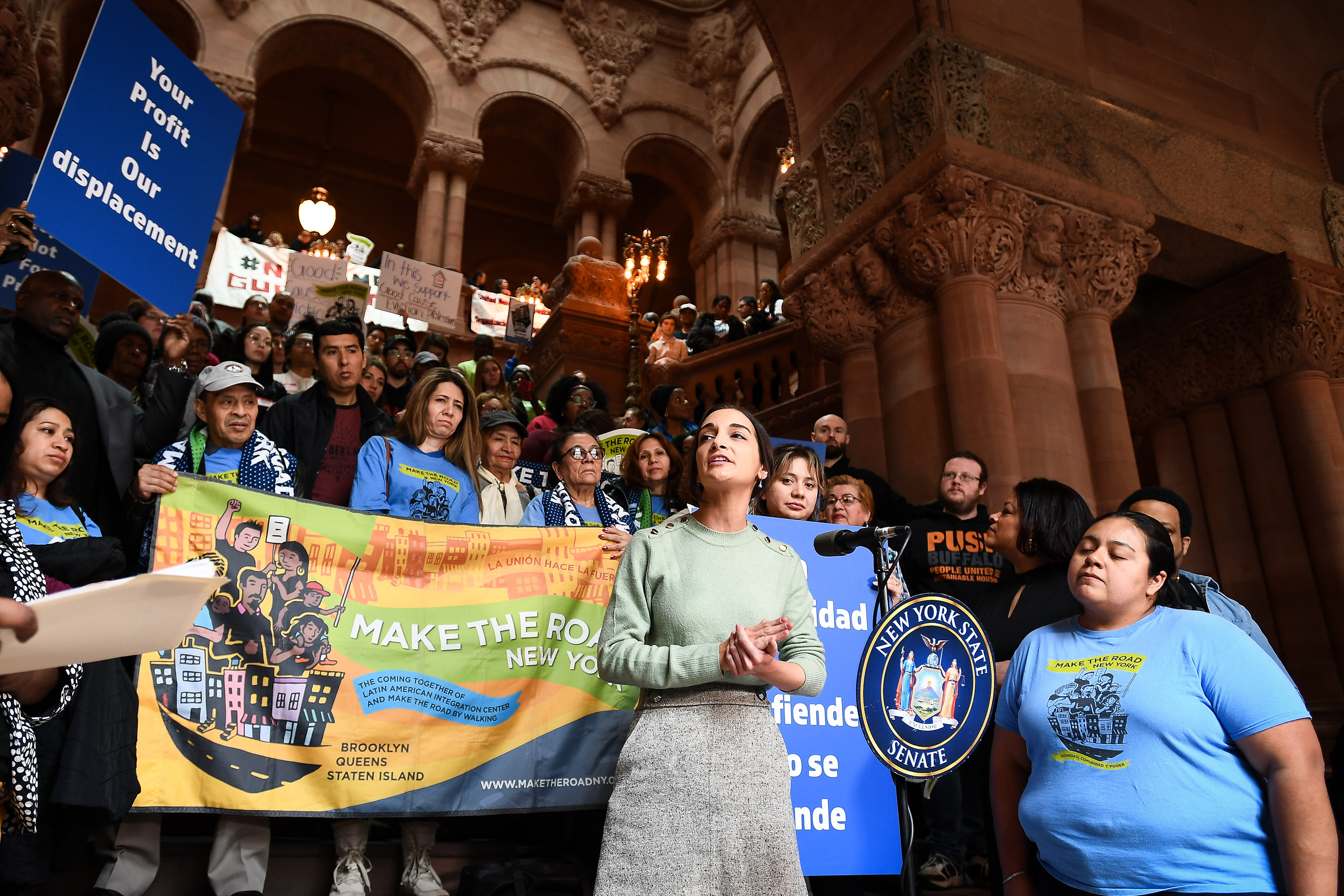
Salazar speaking at a February 2020 rally for affordable housing

While attending college, Salazar worked as a nanny for four years on the Upper West Side and as a housecleaner, and in combination with her study of Middle Eastern history this led her to become more class-conscious. She began as an activist by organizing a tenant group with which she launched a rent strike against poor conditions in her housing block. She then worked at a social justice non-profit, Jews for Racial and Economic Justice (JFREJ) as an organizer.

=== New York State Senate ===
In April 2018, Salazar announced her candidacy for the 18th district of the New York State Senate in the Democratic primary against incumbent Senator Martin Malave Dilan, who had held his position since 2002.

She ran as a democratic socialist. Her campaign gained significant attention after the primary victory of Alexandria Ocasio-Cortez in New York's 14th congressional district. She was endorsed by Our Revolution, the Democratic Socialists of America, Cynthia Nixon, and Ocasio-Cortez herself. Citizens Union initially endorsed her but later revoked their endorsement, citing discrepancies in information she provided about her academic credentials.

On September 13, 2018 Salazar defeated Dilan for the Democratic Party nomination. She was elected unopposed at the November 6 general election. She is a member of the New York State Socialists in Office.

Salazar handily won re-election in 2020, with 86.7% of the votes in the Democratic primary, and 97.5% in the general election. In 2022, Salazar won the general election with 99.2% of the vote (71,329 votes) against write-ins. In 2024, the Democratic and Working Families Party primaries were canceled, leaving Salazar unopposed. She won the general election that November with 98.6% of the vote.

== Political positions ==
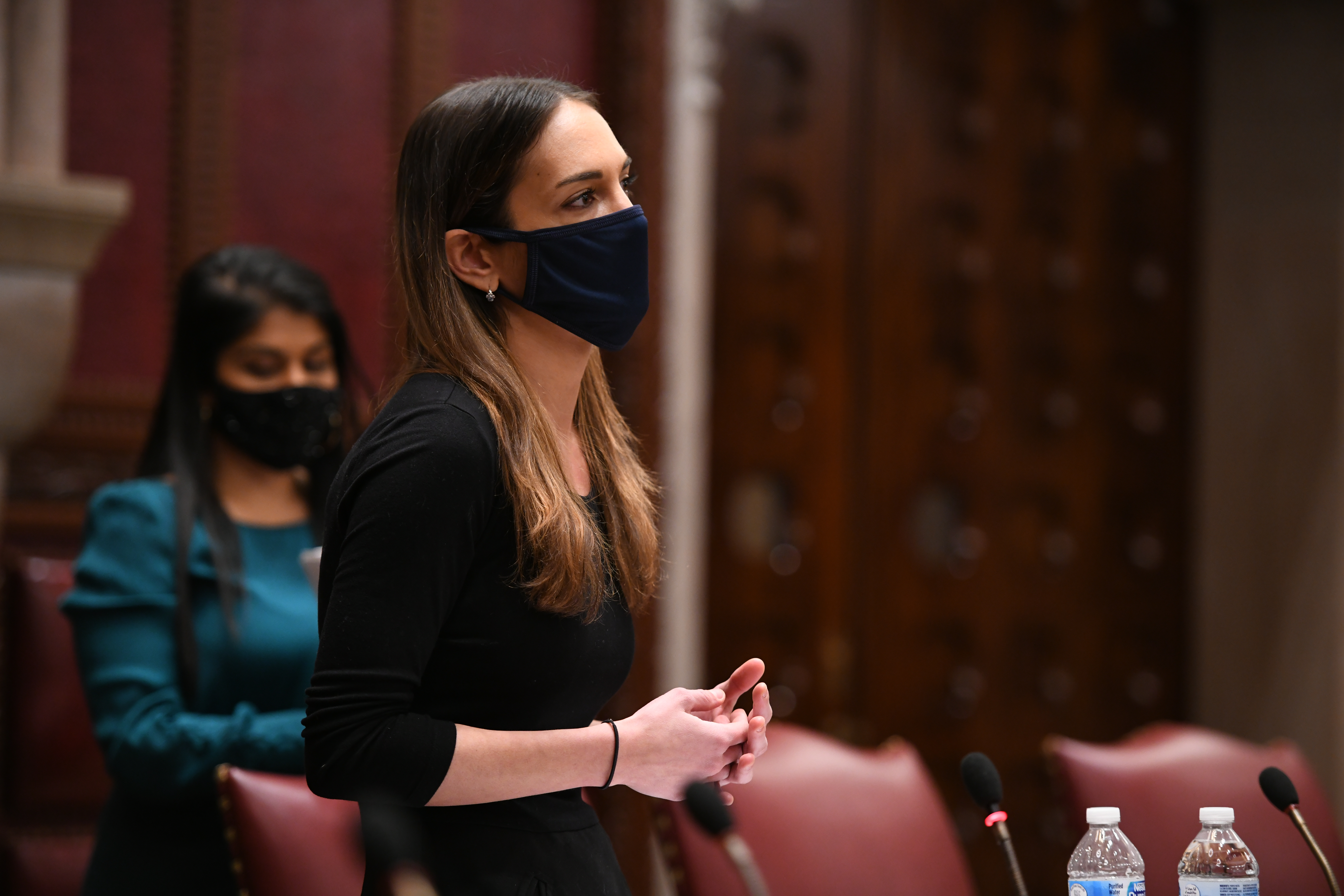
Salazar speaking on a bill in the New York Senate chamber, March 2021

Salazar is a self-described democratic socialist, a member of the New York City chapter of Democratic Socialists of America, and a staff organizer for Jews for Racial and Economic Justice. She supports universal rent control in New York City, decriminalization of sex work, Medicare for All, the abolition of Immigration and Customs Enforcement, and access to abortion services. She also states that she supports the Boycott, Divestment and Sanctions movement which advocates boycotting Israel. She also supported the Housing Stability and Tenant Protection Act of 2019.

Salazar characterizes democratic socialists as those who recognize capitalism to be an inherently oppressive and exploitative system and who actively work to dismantle it in favor of a socialist economic system. Contrasting progressives with democratic socialists, she identifies the former as those offering palliative solutions within capitalism (without advocating for systemic change); however, she also highlights the overlap between the two groups in regard to short-term policy goals.

She endorsed Bernie Sanders in the 2020 Democratic presidential primary. In the 2021 New York City mayoral election, she endorsed Cathy Rojas, the candidate of the Party for Socialism and Liberation.

== Personal life ==
Salazar describes herself as Jewish, saying that she has some Sephardic ancestry through her father, including a Sephardic surname, and that she started to explore Judaism while attending college. In 2018, Armin Rosen of Tablet questioned her heritage by claiming that her brother claimed their father "never mentioned" any Sephardic heritage before his death, though Salazar's mother stated that her husband's family had a Sephardic background, and Salazar's former classmates attested to her Jewish faith in college. Salazar accused Rosen of engaging in "race science" and claimed he had threatened to publish her mother's personal information if she didn't cooperate.

During her first term, Salazar and her staff agreed to be profiled in the graphic memoir Radical: My Year With a Socialist Senator by cartoonist Sofia Warren. Salazar joined Warren for a public discussion about the book at School of Visual Arts in 2023.

=== Sexual assault allegations against Keyes ===
On September 11, 2018, Salazar accused David Keyes, a spokesperson for Israeli Prime Minister Benjamin Netanyahu, of sexual assault, stating she was preempting being outed in a story about to be published by The Daily Caller. Keyes denied assaulting her in a statement to Israeli newspaper Haaretz. Eleven additional women subsequently alleged similar instances of harassment or assault by him. Keyes resigned from his position in December 2018.

== See also ==
- List of Democratic Socialists of America who have held office in the United States
