= New York's 54th State Assembly district =

American legislative district

Assemblymember
Erik Martin Dilan; D–Cypress Hills

New York's 54th State Assembly district is one of the 150 districts in the New York State Assembly. It has been represented by Erik Martin Dilan since 2015.

== Geography ==
=== 2020s ===
==== 2022 ====
District 54 is in Brooklyn. It encompasses Bushwick, Cypress Hills, and portions of East New York.

The district overlaps (partially) with New York's 7th and 8th congressional districts, the 18th, 19th and 25th districts of the New York State Senate, and the 37th and 42nd districts of the New York City Council.

=== 2010s ===
District 54 is in Brooklyn. It encompassed Cypress Hills and portions of Bed-Stuy, Bushwick, and East New York.

== Recent election results ==
=== 2026 ===
2026 New York State Assembly election, District 54
Primary election
Party	Candidate	Votes	%
Democratic	Christian Tate	4,192	62.0
Democratic	Erik Dilan (incumbent)	2,550	37.7
Write-in		16	0.3
Total votes		6,746	100
General election
Democratic	Christian Tate		
Working Families	Christian Tate		
Total	Christian Tate		
Write-in			
Total votes			100.0

=== 2024 ===
2024 New York State Assembly election, District 54
Party	Candidate	Votes	%
Democratic	Erik Dilan (incumbent)	21,908	98.8
Write-in		277	1.2
Total votes		22,185	100.0
Democratic hold			

=== 2022 ===
2022 New York State Assembly election, District 54
Primary election
Party	Candidate	Votes	%
Democratic	Erik Dilan (incumbent)	2,524	52.1
Democratic	Samy Olivares	2,313	47.7
Write-in		8	0.2
Total votes		4,845	100.0
General election
Democratic	Erik Dilan (incumbent)	12,163	85.9
Republican	Khorshed Chowdhury	1,932	13.6
Write-in		65	0.5
Total votes		14,160	100.0
Democratic hold			

=== 2020 ===
2020 New York State Assembly election, District 54
Party	Candidate	Votes	%
Democratic	Erik Dilan (incumbent)	29,619	85.6
Republican	Khorshed Chowdhury	3,211	9.3
Green	Scott Hutchins	1,693	4.9
Write-in		52	0.2
Total votes		34,575	100.0
Democratic hold			

=== 2018 ===
2018 New York State Assembly election, District 54
Party	Candidate	Votes	%
Democratic	Erik Dilan (incumbent)	22,659	95.2
Republican	Khorshed Chowdhury	885	
Conservative	Khorshed Chowdhury	198	
Total	Khorshed Chowdhury	1,083	4.6
Write-in		51	0.2
Total votes		23,793	100.0
Democratic hold			

=== 2016 ===
2016 New York State Assembly election, District 54
Party	Candidate	Votes	%
Democratic	Erik Dilan	28,424	
Independence	Erik Dilan	728	
Total	Erik Dilan (incumbent)	29,152	95.0
Republican	Khorshed Chowdhury	1,513	4.9
Write-in		38	0.1
Total votes		30,703	100.0
Democratic hold			

=== 2014 ===
2014 New York State Assembly election, District 54
Primary election
Party	Candidate	Votes	%
Democratic	Erik Dilan	1,955	59.8
Democratic	Kimberly Council	1,305	39.9
Write-in		11	0.3
Total votes		3,271	100.0
General election
Democratic	Erik Dilan	7,514	85.8
Working Families	Kimberly Council	859	9.8
Republican	Khorshed Chowdhury	289	
Conservative	Khorshed Chowdhury	92	
Total	Khorshed Chowdhury	381	4.3
Write-in		7	0.1
Total votes		8,761	100.0
Democratic hold			

=== 2012 ===
2012 New York State Assembly election, District 54
Primary election
Party	Candidate	Votes	%
Democratic	Rafael Espinal (incumbent)	2,245	65.9
Democratic	Juan Rodriguez	1,152	33.8
Write-in		9	0.3
Total votes		3,406	100.0
General election
Democratic	Rafael Espinal	23,959	
Conservative	Rafael Espinal	283	
Total	Rafael Espinal (incumbent)	24,242	96.5
Republican	Khorshed Chowdhury	858	3.4
Write-in		17	0.1
Total votes		25,117	100.0
Democratic hold			

=== 2011 special ===
Incumbent Darryl Towns resigned his seat on April 28, 2011 to become Commissioner and CEO of the New York State Homes and Community Renewal agency, triggering a special election. In special elections for state legislative offices, primaries are usually not held – county committee members and district leaders for each party select nominees. Election was held on September 13, 2011.

2011 New York State Assembly special election, District 54
Party	Candidate	Votes	%
Democratic	Rafael Espinal	2,301	
Conservative	Rafael Espinal	187	
United We Can	Rafael Espinal	41	
Total	Rafael Espinal	2,529	46.2
Working Families	Jesus Gonzalez	1,894	34.6
Community First	Deidra Towns	1,047	19.1
Write-in		3	0.1
Total votes		5,473	100.0
Democratic hold			

=== 2010 ===
2010 New York State Assembly election, District 54
Party	Candidate	Votes	%
Democratic	Darryl Towns	10,338	
Working Families	Darryl Towns	482	
Total	Darryl Towns (incumbent)	10,820	94.6
Republican	Khorshed Chowdhury	489	
Conservative	Khorshed Chowdhury	127	
Total	Khorshed Chowdhury	616	5.4
Write-in		3	0.0
Total votes		11,439	100.0
Democratic hold			

=== 2008 ===
2008 New York State Assembly election, District 54
Party	Candidate	Votes	%
Democratic	Darryl Towns	20,033	
Working Families	Darryl Towns	499	
Total	Darryl Towns (incumbent)	20,532	95.7
Republican	Khorshed Chowdhury	815	
Conservative	Khorshed Chowdhury	108	
Total	Khorshed Chowdhury	923	4.3
Write-in		1	0.0
Total votes		21,456	100.0
Democratic hold			

=== 2006 ===
2006 New York State Assembly election, District 54
Party	Candidate	Votes	%
Democratic	Darryl Towns	7,770	
Working Families	Darryl Towns	422	
Total	Darryl Towns (incumbent)	8,192	94.2
Republican	Khorshed Chowdhury	381	
Conservative	Khorshed Chowdhury	122	
Total	Khorshed Chowdhury	503	5.8
Write-in		0	0.0
Total votes		8,695	100.0
Democratic hold			

=== 2004 ===
2004 New York State Assembly election, District 54
Primary election
Party	Candidate	Votes	%
Democratic	Darryl Towns (incumbent)	2,268	70.7
Democratic	Heriberto Santiago	938	29.3
Write-in		0	0.0
Total votes		3,206	100.0
General election
Democratic	Darryl Towns	16,534	
Working Families	Darryl Towns	605	
Total	Darryl Towns (incumbent)	17,139	92.6
Republican	Khorshed Chowdhury	1,244	
Conservative	Khorshed Chowdhury	126	
Total	Khorshed Chowdhury	1,370	7.4
Write-in		0	0.0
Total votes		18,509	100.0
Democratic hold			

=== 2002 ===
2002 New York State Assembly election, District 54
Primary election
Party	Candidate	Votes	%
Democratic	Darryl Towns (incumbent)	2,809	65.7
Democratic	Gladys Santiago	1,139	26.6
Democratic	Everlyn Prado	326	7.6
Write-in		1	0.0
Total votes		4,275	100.0
General election
Democratic	Darryl Towns	7,846	
Working Families	Darryl Towns	264	
Independence	Darryl Towns	157	
Liberal	Darryl Towns	75	
Total	Darryl Towns (incumbent)	8,342	90.9
Republican	Khorshed Chowdhury	721	
Conservative	Khorshed Chowdhury	112	
Total	Khorshed Chowdhury	833	9.1
Write-in		0	0.0
Total votes		9,175	100.0
Democratic hold			

=== 2000 ===
2000 New York State Assembly election, District 54
Party	Candidate	Votes	%
Democratic	Darryl Towns	14,644	
Working Families	Darryl Towns	546	
Independence	Darryl Towns	185	
Liberal	Darryl Towns	172	
Total	Darryl Towns (incumbent)	15,547	94.2
Republican	John Venturina	855	
Conservative	John Venturina	109	
Total	John Venturina	964	5.8
Write-in		1	0.0
Total votes		16,512	100.0
Democratic hold			
