= George Martinez =

George Martinez may refer to:

- George Martinez (activist) (born 1974), Anchorage, Alaska politician
- George Martinez (American football) (born 1961), American football coach and former player
