= Martin Malave Dilan =

American politician

Martin Dilan
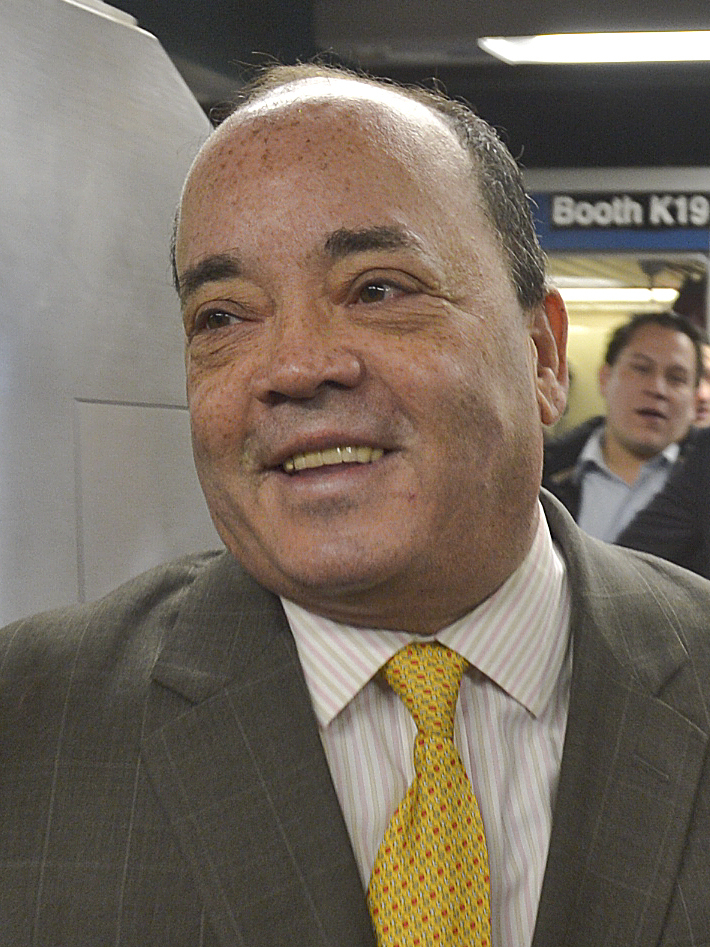

Member of the New York State Senate
- In office January 1, 2003 – December 31, 2018
- Preceded by: Nellie Santiago
- Succeeded by: Julia Salazar
- Constituency: 17th district (2003–12); 18th district (2013–19)

Member of the New York City Council from the 37th district
- In office January 1, 1992 – December 31, 2001
- Preceded by: District created
- Succeeded by: Erik Martin Dilan

Personal details
- Born: September 12, 1950 (age 75) Bushwick, New York, U.S.
- Party: Democratic
- Spouse: Debra Hicks
- Children: 3, including Erik Martin Dilan
- Website: Official website

Martin Malavé Dilan (born September 12, 1950) is a former member of the New York State Senate representing the 17th and 18th Senate Districts. The 18th Senate District encompasses the northern Brooklyn communities of Bushwick, Williamsburg, Greenpoint, Cypress Hills, City-Line, East New York, Bedford-Stuyvesant and Brownsville.

A Democrat, Dilan was a member of the New York City Council for 10 years. In 1994, Dilan voted for vacancy decontrol legislation; he later stated that he regretted his vote.

In November 2002, Dilan was elected to the New York State Senate. He served a total of eight terms in the Senate. Dilan voted in favor of the Marriage Equality Act in 2011 and voted for the gun control law known as the NY SAFE Act in 2013. On September 13, 2018, Dilan was defeated by Julia Salazar, a 27-year-old democratic socialist who ran an insurgent Democratic primary campaign against him.

Dilan's parents came to the United States from Puerto Rico. He resides in Bushwick. Dilan's son, Erik Martin Dilan, is a Democratic politician; as of January 2019, Erik Dilan represents the 54th District in the New York State Assembly.

Political offices
Preceded by District created	New York City Council, 37th district 1992–2001	Succeeded by Erik Martin Dilan
Preceded by Thomas W. Libous	Chairman of the Senate Committee on Transportation; 2009–2010	Succeeded by Charles Fuschillo
New York State Senate
Preceded by Nellie R. Santiago	New York State Senate, 17th district 2003–2012	Succeeded by Simcha Felder
Preceded by Velmanette Montgomery	New York State Senate, 18th district 2013–2018	Succeeded by Julia Salazar
