= Open-source unionism =

Model for organizing workers

Open-source unionism is a term coined by academics Richard B. Freeman and Joel Rogers to explain a possible new model for organizing workers that depended on the labor movement "taking its own historical lessons with diversified membership seriously and relying more heavily on the Internet in membership communication and servicing".

The idea was popularized in a June 2002 article for The Nation and more completely elaborated on in an earlier piece in the Spring 2002 issue of the academic journal WorkingUSA. Freeman analyzed implementation of the concept in a 2005 paper.

== See also ==
- Freelancers Union - A non-profit organization in the United States that represents the needs and concerns of the independent workforce through advocacy, information, and service.
