= Erik Martin Dilan =

American politician

Erik Dilan
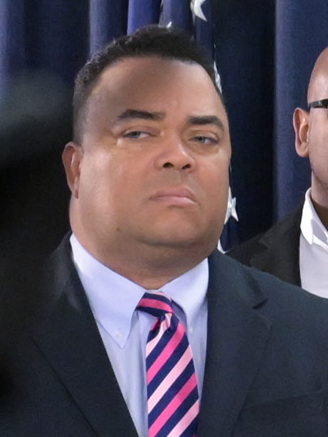
- Dilan in 2025

Member of the New York State Assembly from the 54th district
- Incumbent
- Assumed office January 1, 2015
- Preceded by: Rafael Espinal
- Succeeded by: Christian Celeste Tate (elect)

Member of the New York City Council from the 37th district
- In office January 1, 2002 – December 31, 2013
- Preceded by: Martin Malave Dilan
- Succeeded by: Rafael Espinal

Personal details
- Born: May 11, 1974 (age 52) Brooklyn, New York, U.S.
- Party: Democratic
- Spouse: Jannitza Luna
- Relatives: Martin Malave Dilan (father)
- Education: St. John's University
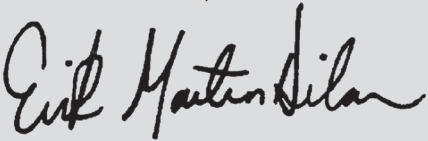
- Signature
- Website: State Assembly website

Erik Martin Dilan (born May 11, 1974) is an American politician. A Democrat, Dilan represents the 54th district of the New York Assembly which comprises the Brooklyn neighborhoods of Bushwick, Cypress Hills, East New York, Ocean Hill, and Brownsville. Formerly, he represented the 37th district of the New York City Council from 2002 to 2014. In 2026, Dilan was primaried for his Assembly seat in District 54, and on June 23, 2026, he lost the Democratic primary to Christian Celeste Tate.

== Early life, education, and early career ==
Dilan graduated from Norman Thomas High School, Philippa Schuyler Middle School, and P.S. 151. He later graduated from St. John's University, earning an A.S. in Business Administration.

He was a member of Community School Board 32.

== New York City Council ==
=== Elections ===
In 2001, incumbent Democrat NYC Councilman (and Dilan's father) Martin Malave Dilan of the 37th Council district decided to retire in order to run for the New York Senate. Dilan decided to run for his father's seat. He won the Democratic primary with a plurality of 33% of the vote. In the general election, Dilan won the seat with 87% and defeated three third party candidates. In 2003, he was challenged in the Democratic primary by just one candidate, State Senator Nellie R. Santiago, and defeated her 65%–35%. He won re-election to second term with 92% of the vote. In 2005, he was unopposed in the primary and won re-election to a third term with 84% of the vote. In 2007, he wasn't challenged at all to win a fourth term. In 2009, won re-election to a fifth term with 87% of the vote.

Dilan faced a primary challenge in 2024 from Samy Nemir Olivares, retaining his seat by a mere 190 votes. In June 2026, he lost in a primary challenge from Christian Celeste Tate.

=== Committee assignments ===
He was chair of the Council's Housing & Buildings Committee, while also serving on the Rules, Privileges & Elections, Zoning & Franchises, and Rules committees. While there, he refused to allow a bill to count all vacant properties in the city out of committee. This was met with a sleep-out outside his office by activists with Picture the Homeless

=== Controversies ===
Dilan illegally acquired an "affordable housing" unit for which he exceeded the allowable income to qualify because of his connections in the real estate industry. He was punished with a $9,000 fine in January 2015.

== 2012 congressional election ==
After redistricting, he decided to challenge incumbent Democratic U.S. Congresswoman Nydia Velázquez (D-Williamsburg) for New York's 7th congressional district. He said "We've had an incumbent who has been there for 20 years and she's done little with the post. She's going to have to justify after 20 years of nothing, why she should remain in office." Dilan took second place in the Democratic primary with 35% of the vote.

Democratic primary results
Party	Candidate	Votes	%
Democratic	Nydia Velazquez (incumbent)	17,208	57.9
Democratic	Erik Dilan	10,408	35.0
Democratic	Dan O'Connor	1,351	4.6
Democratic	George Martinez	745	2.5
Total votes		29,712	100.0
