= Edolphus Towns =

American politician (born 1934)

Ed Towns
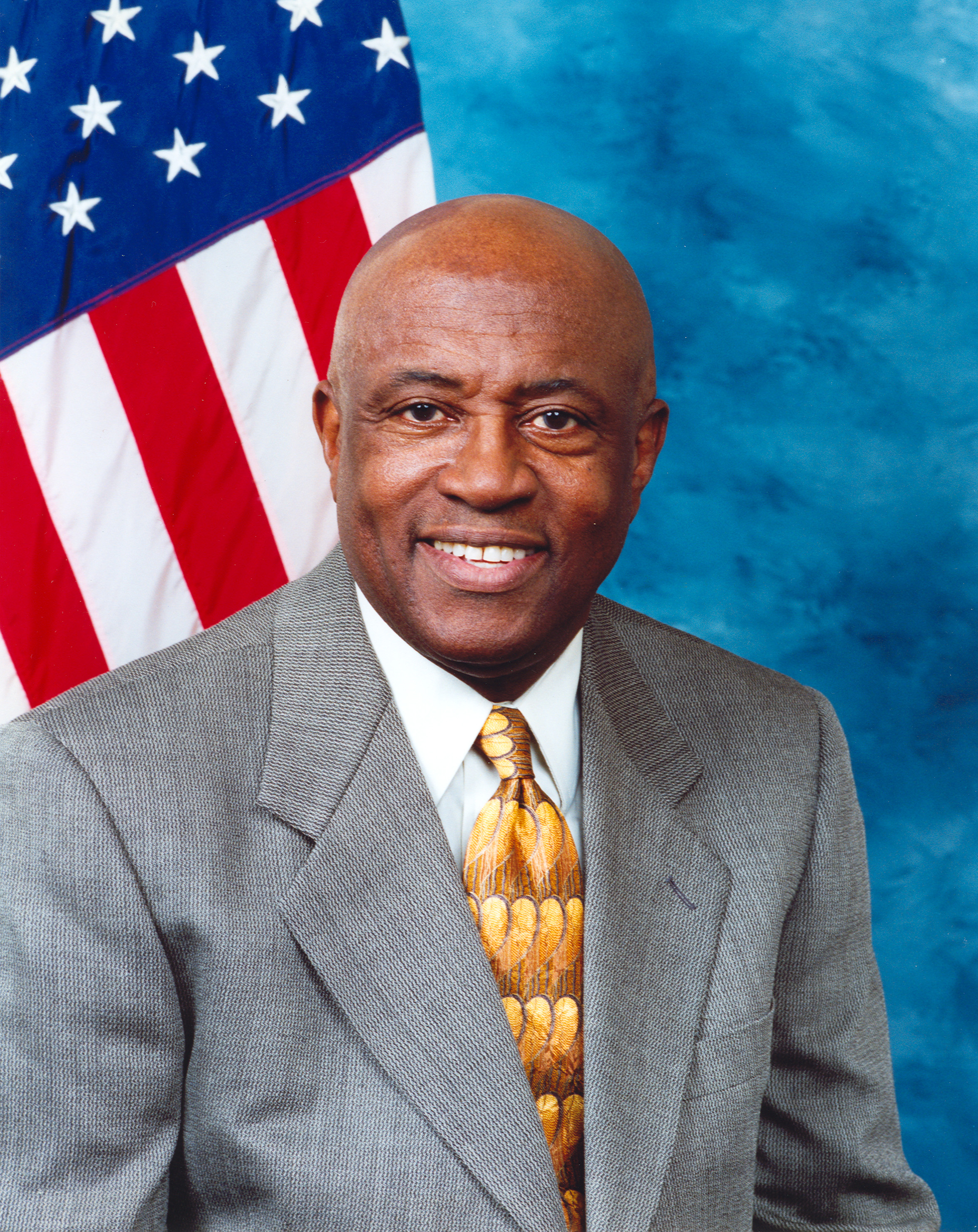
- Official portrait, 2008

Chair of the House Oversight Committee
- In office January 3, 2009 – January 3, 2011
- Preceded by: Henry Waxman
- Succeeded by: Darrell Issa

Member of the U.S. House of Representatives from New York
- In office January 3, 1983 – January 3, 2013
- Preceded by: James H. Scheuer
- Succeeded by: Hakeem Jeffries (redistricted)
- Constituency: 11th district (1983–1993); 10th district (1993–2013)

Personal details
- Born: Edolphus Towns Jr. July 21, 1934 (age 91) Chadbourn, North Carolina, U.S.
- Party: Democratic
- Spouse: Gwen Forbes
- Children: 2, including Darryl
- Education: North Carolina A&T State University (BS); Adelphi University (MSW)

Military service
- Branch/service: United States Army
- Years of service: 1956–1958
- Towns's voice Towns honoring retiring U.S. Rep. Thomas Manton. Recorded October 14, 1998

Edolphus "Ed" Towns Jr. (born July 21, 1934) is an American educator, military veteran, and politician who served in the United States House of Representatives from 1983 to 2013. A Democrat from New York, Towns was chairman of the House Oversight and Government Reform Committee from 2009 to 2011.

During his 30 years in Congress, Towns represented districts based in Brooklyn: first New York's 11th congressional district, from 1983 to 1993, and then the 10th district from 1993 to 2013.

== Early life, education, and early career ==
Towns was born in Chadbourn, North Carolina, the son of Versie (née Brown) and Edolphus Towns. He graduated from West Side High School, Chadbourn, North Carolina in 1952. He earned a bachelor's degree in sociology from North Carolina A&T State University in 1956 and a master's degree in social work from Adelphi University in 1973. Towns is a member of Phi Beta Sigma fraternity.

Towns was an administrator at Beth Israel Medical Center, a professor at New York's Medgar Evers College and Fordham University, and a public school teacher teaching orientation and mobility to blind students. In 1956, he joined the United States Army as a private and received basic combat training at Fort Hood, Texas with the 4th Armored Division. He served until 1958. He was also an ordained Baptist minister.

In 1970, he ran for New York Assembly District 38, and was defeated in the Democratic primary by John Mullally, 75%–25%. In 1972, he ran in District 40 and was defeated in the Democratic primary by Edward Griffith, who won the primary with a plurality of 37%.

== U.S. House of Representatives ==
=== Elections ===
After redistricting, Towns ran for the open seat in the Brooklyn-based New York's 11th congressional district. Towns won the Democratic primary with a plurality of 48%, and won the general election with 84% of the vote. He never won a general election campaign with less than 85% of the vote. He has won the Democratic primary with at least 60% of the vote all but three times (1998, 2000, and 2006).

From 1996 to 1998, Towns was in a rivalry with Brooklyn Democratic Party Chairman Clarence Norman. In addition, he has received criticism for endorsing Republican Rudy Giuliani for Mayor of New York City in 1997. He was challenged in the 1998 primaries by Barry D. Ford, a 35-year-old lawyer with the firm of Cleary, Gottlieb, Steen & Hamilton and also faced a challenge from political activist Ken Diamondstone. Towns won the primary with 55% of the vote. In 2000, Ford ran for a rematch against Towns and lost 57%–43%.

In 2006, Towns faced Democratic primary challenges from Charles Barron, a member of the New York City Council, and Roger Green, a former member of the New York State Assembly. Barron was a staunch ally of Al Sharpton. Green was convicted of stealing $3,000 in taxpayer dollars. Towns defeated Barron and Green 47%–37%–15%, the worst primary performance of his career. In 2012, Towns endorsed Barron in the race for his Congressional seat, but Barron was routed by a 72–28% margin and the seat went to Hakeem Jeffries.

Kevin Powell, a hip hop activist, writer, and former cast member on the MTV Reality TV show The Real World, opted out of challenging Towns for the 2006 Democratic nomination, challenging him in 2008 instead. Powell criticized Towns for supporting Hillary Clinton over Barack Obama in the Democratic presidential primaries. Towns defeated Powell 69%–31%.

=== Tenure ===
Towns served on the Energy and Commerce Committee and is a member of the Congressional Black Caucus. On January 7, 2009, his proposed legislation to require information on Presidential donors kicked off the new session of the 111th Congress. Towns' past accomplishments include, co-sponsoring or enacting several pieces of federal legislation, including the Student Right To Know Act, which mandated the reporting of the rate of graduation among student athletes, creating the Telecommunications Development Fund, which provides capital for minority business initiatives, and the development of a federal program for poison control centers.

He had been targeted by various Democratic Party constituencies, including factions led by his political rival Al Sharpton, and national and local labor unions, who resent his support for passage of the Central American Free Trade Agreement, which passed the House of Representatives by a razor-thin margin. In addition, he has been heavily criticized for taking money from telecom PACs and opposing net neutrality.

He put particular emphasis on arguing in behalf of underserved Brooklyn communities, and has won recognition from several organizations for his efforts. The National Audubon Society has honored him for his efforts in fighting to secure federal funds for the restoration of Prospect Park. Towns fought to have Environmental Protection Agency testing in the aftermath of the September 11 attacks, including neighborhoods outside of the borough of Manhattan.

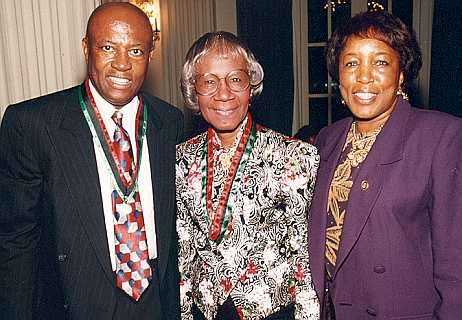
Edolphus Towns and wife Gwen meet with Shirley Chisholm (center)

Towns delayed the investigation into Countrywide Financial's VIP loan program when he was the House oversight panel's chairman by refusing to issue a subpoena for Bank of America records. After The Wall Street Journal reported that public loan documents indicated Towns had received two mortgages from the VIP program, he issued the subpoena and his office denied wrongdoing.

In December 2010, he announced that he would not seek the position of Ranking Minority Member of the Oversight Committee in the next Congress, even though his seniority and service as Chair would typically result in him filling this post. Towns reportedly withdrew due to lack of support from Nancy Pelosi, who reportedly feared Towns would not be a sufficiently aggressive leader in an anticipated struggle with incoming committee chair Darrell Issa (R-CA). Towns's successor is Elijah Cummings, who defeated Carolyn Maloney in a vote of the House Democratic Caucus.

On April 16, 2012, Towns announced he would be retiring at the end of his 15th term. His district had been renumbered as the 8th district in redistricting and had a significant increase of white voters, though it still had a large black majority.

=== Committee assignments ===
- Committee on Energy and Commerce
  - Subcommittee on Commerce, Manufacturing and Trade
  - Subcommittee on Communications and Technology
  - Subcommittee on Health
- Committee on Oversight and Government Reform
  - Subcommittee on Government Organization, Efficiency and Financial Management (Ranking Member)

=== Caucus memberships ===
- Congressional Black Caucus
- House Democratic Caucus
- Congressional COPD Caucus
- International Conservation Caucus
- Congressional Arts Caucus

== Later career ==
After leaving Congress, Towns became a senior advisor for the government relations and lobbying firm Gray Global Advisors.

== Personal life ==
Towns is married to the former Gwendolyn Forbes and they reside in the Cypress Hills section of Brooklyn. They have two children, Darryl (who had served in the New York State Assembly but vacated his seat to become commissioner and chief executive of New York State Homes and Community Renewal agency when appointed by Gov. Andrew Cuomo) and Deidra, who ran in special election to replace her brother, on a self-created ticket, Community First.

He is a distant cousin of White House correspondent April Ryan.

== See also ==
- List of African-American United States representatives

U.S. House of Representatives
Preceded by James H. Scheuer	Member of the U.S. House of Representatives from New York's 11th congressional district 1983–1993	Succeeded by Major Owens
Preceded by Ron Dellums	Chair of the Congressional Black Caucus; 1991–1993	Succeeded by Kweisi Mfume
Preceded by Chuck Schumer	Member of the U.S. House of Representatives from New York's 10th congressional district 1993–2013	Succeeded by Jerry Nadler
Preceded by Henry Waxman	Chair of the House Oversight Committee; 2009–2011	Succeeded by Darrell Issa
U.S. order of precedence (ceremonial)
Preceded by Anna Eshoo as Former U.S. Representative	Order of precedence of the United States as Former U.S. Representative	Succeeded by Gary Ackerman as Former U.S. Representative
