= Exploitative interactions =

Exploitative interactions, also known as enemy–victim interactions, is a part of consumer–resource interactions where one organism (the enemy) is the consumer of another organism (the victim), typically in a harmful manner. Some examples of this include predator–prey interactions, host–pathogen interactions, and brood parasitism.

In exploitative interactions, the enemy and the victim may often coevolve with each other. How exactly they coevolve depends on many factors, such as population density. One evolutionary consequence of exploitative interactions is antagonistic coevolution. This can occur because of resistance, where the victim attempts to decrease the number of successful attacks by the enemy, which encourages the enemy to evolve in response, thus resulting in a coevolutionary arms race. On the other hand, toleration, where the victim attempts to decrease the effect on fitness that successful enemy attacks have, may also evolve.

Exploitative interactions can have significant biological effects. For example, exploitative interactions between a predator and prey can result in the extinction of the victim (the prey, in this case), as the predator, by definition, kills the prey, and thus reduces its population. Another effect of these interactions is in the coevolutionary "hot" and "cold spots" put forth by geographic mosaic theory. In this case, coevolution caused by resistance would create "hot spots" of coevolutionary activity in an otherwise uniform environment, whereas "cold spots" would be created by the evolution of tolerance, which generally does not create a coevolutionary arms race.

== See also ==
- Biological interactions
- Coevolution
- Consumer–resource interactions
- Host-pathogen interaction
- Parasitism
- Predation
