= Sara Horowitz =

American executive and author (born 1963)

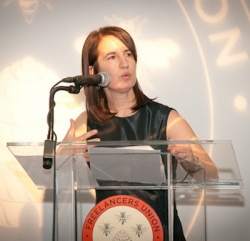
- Horowitz Freelancers Union 2010 Annual Benefit
- Born: January 13, 1963 (age 63); New York City, U.S.
- Education: Cornell University (BA); University at Buffalo (JD); Harvard University (MPA)
- Occupation: Entrepreneur
- Spouse: Peter DeChiara
- Children: 1

Sara Horowitz (born January 13, 1963) is a founder of the Freelancers Union and a proponent of mutualism. She has been working for unions since age 18, when she held a summer internship at the International Ladies Garment Workers Union. She has worked for the UAW, CSEA, and SEIU, and she currently serves on the board of the Albert Shanker Institute. Under her direction, the Freelancers Union built a first-of-its-kind Portable Benefits Network in 2004 and launched the Freelancers Insurance Company in 2009, which provided health insurance to more than 25,000 New York freelancers before it was closed in 2014. In her work, Horowitz advocates for the role of mutualist organizations, including unions, cooperatives, mutual aid groups, and faith-based groups, as the foundation for the next labor economy and social safety net in the United States.

Earlier in her career, Horowitz worked as a union organizer with 1199, SEIU, a public defender with the Legal Aid Society, and as a union-side labor lawyer. She was named a MacArthur Fellow in 1999 and has served on the board of the Federal Reserve Bank of New York, serving as Chair from 201x-201x. In addition, she served on the board of the Nathan Cummings Foundation and currently sits on the Board of Directors of Ashoka.

== Early life and education ==
Horowitz is Jewish and grew up in Brooklyn Heights in Brooklyn, New York in a labor family. Her father was a union lawyer and her mother a lifelong member of the United Federation of Teachers. She attended Brooklyn Friends School, a Quaker school in Brooklyn.

Horowitz graduated from Cornell University's School of Industrial and Labor Relations with a B.A. degree in 1984 and was awarded its labor prize. She graduated cum laude from the University at Buffalo Law School. She later attended the John F. Kennedy School of Government at Harvard University and received her MPA in 1995.

== Career ==
Horowitz has built her life’s work on the philosophy that mutualist organizing will be the foundation of the next social safety net. She began her career in 1984 when she worked with 1199 SEIU to organize nursing home workers. An early career misclassification as an independent contractor, rather than a full-time employee, led her to realize the effects of the benefits gap that many freelance workers face in today’s labor economy. Seeking to address this issue, in 1993 Horowitz founded Working Today, an organization that advocates on behalf of freelancer workers and provides its freelancer members with a range of benefits, including legal services, retirement plans, and insurance.

After she was awarded a MacArthur “genius” award for her organizing efforts at Working Today, Horowitz founded the Freelancers Union. Basing the Union’s financial model on past models like the Amalgamated Clothing Workers Union, which built a bank, insurance company and cooperative housing for its members, Horowitz drew on her organizing experience to build a sustainable economic model that supported the Union’s work and the particular needs of freelance workers. With Horowitz as executive director, the Freelancers Union went on to develop the first Freelancers Portable Benefit Model and the Freelancers Insurance Company, a fully insured Article 42 Insurance Company in the State of New York with an annual revenue of $100 Million. Horowitz and the Freelancers Union led a successful campaign with a coalition of labor and community groups to pass the Freelance Isn’t Free Act in 2016, which created a new series of legal provisions to protect freelance workers against client non-payment and other exploitative labor practices.

From 2018-2020, Horowitz was the CEO and co-founder of a Sequoia backed startup developing insurtech infrastructure for portable benefits for freelancers. Trupo developed proprietary short term disability (income replacement) insurance products in Georgia, New York, New Jersey to demonstrate the needed features of the new social safety net.

== Personal life and family ==
Horowitz is married to Peter DeChiara, a partner in a union side labor law firm. They have a daughter, Rachel.

Her grandfather Israel Horowitz was vice-president of the International Ladies Garment Workers Union in New York. Her grandmother lived in ILGWU housing on the Lower East Side of Manhattan.

== Publications ==
=== Books ===
- (2012) The Freelancers Bible
- (2015) The Freelancers Union Guide to Taxes
- (2021) Mutualism: Building the Next Economy from the Ground Up

=== Articles ===
- (1997) "A New Labor Structure for a Transient and Mobile Workforce" Perspectives on Work, 1(1), 50–52.
- (December 1, 2004) "Ensure They’re Insured: Sara Horowitz on the Independent Workforce" Harvard Business Review
- (2006) "Freelancers of the World, Unite!" The Economist
- (September 24, 2010) "Why Is Washington Ignoring the Freelance Economy?" The Atlantic
- (September 1, 2011) "The Freelance Surge Is the Industrial Revolution of Our Time" The Atlantic
- (March 13, 2012) "The Dream of the 1890s: Why Old Mutualism Is Making a New Comeback" The Atlantic
- (September 3, 2012) "How Do You Build a Union for the 21st Century? (Step 1: Learn From History)" The Atlantic
- (November 19, 2013) "What is New Mutualism?" Huffington Post
- (May 1, 2014) "The Impact of Client Nonpayment on the Income of Contingent Workers: Evidence from the Freelancers Union Independent Worker Survey" ILR Review, 67, 702–733.
- (August 25, 2014) "America, say Goodbye to the Era of Big Work" The Los Angeles Times
- (September 7, 2015) "Help for the Way We Work Now" The New York Times
- (2015) "Freelancers in the U.S. Workforce" Monthly Labor Review, U.S. Bureau of Labor Statistics
- (October 27, 2016) "Putting Government on Freelancers’ Side: Why the City Needs to Help Independent Workers Collect the Pay They’re Owed" New York Daily News
- (April 18, 2017) "Why Tax Day is a Nightmare for Freelancers" Los Angeles Times

== Awards and honors ==
- 1995 Echoing Green Fellowship
- 2003 Manhattan Institute Social Entrepreneurship Award
- 2011 Forbes Impact 30 Social Entrepreneurs
- 2013 New York State Senate Woman of Distinction Award

In recognition of her efforts to create a self-sustaining organization of flexible workers, Sara Horowitz was awarded a MacArthur Foundation Fellowship ("genius" grant) in 1999. In 2002, she was named as one of Esquire Magazine’s "Fifty Best & Brightest" and received a community development award from the New York Mayor’s Office.

Horowitz is also recognized as one of the World Economic Forum’s 100 Global Leaders for Tomorrow, and was selected as one of the 2015 “POLITICO 50", POLITICO magazine’s marquee annual list of thinkers, doers, and visionaries transforming American politics. She is also on the board of Women's Housing and Economic Development Corporation, Emily K. Rafferty Designated Chair and Kathryn S. Wylde Redesignated Deputy Chair, and the recipient of the Eugene V. Debs Award for her contribution in building the labor movement for gig workers.
