= Mosaic coevolution =

Mosaic coevolution is a theory in which geographic location and community ecology shape differing coevolution between strongly interacting species in multiple populations. These populations may be separated by space and/or time. Depending on the ecological conditions, the interspecific interactions may be mutualistic or antagonistic. In mutualisms, both partners benefit from the interaction, whereas one partner generally experiences decreased fitness in antagonistic interactions. Arms races consist of two species adapting ways to "one up" the other. Several factors affect these relationships, including hot spots, cold spots, and trait mixing. Reciprocal selection occurs when a change in one partner puts pressure on the other partner to change in response. Hot spots are areas of strong reciprocal selection, while cold spots are areas with no reciprocal selection or where only one partner is present. The three constituents of geographic structure that contribute to this particular type of coevolution are: natural selection in the form of a geographic mosaic, hot spots often surrounded by cold spots, and trait remixing by means of genetic drift and gene flow. Mosaic, along with general coevolution, most commonly occurs at the population level and is driven by both the biotic and the abiotic environment. These environmental factors can constrain coevolution and affect how far it can escalate.

The geographical mosaic theory was first described by Ehrlich and Raven in 1964 after studying butterflies that coevolve with plants. However, the idea of coevolution itself goes all the way back to Darwin.

== Examples ==
=== Mutualisms ===
A commonly used example of mutualism in mosaic coevolution is that of the plant and pollinator. Anderson and Johnson studied the relationship between the length of the proboscis of the long-tongued fly (P. ganglbaueri) and the corolla tube length of Zaluzianskya microsiphon, a flowering plant endemic to South Africa. They suspected, as Darwin did in 1862, that flowers would adapt to become longer in order to force the fly to insert more of its body into the flower in order to reach the nectar. This causes the fly's body to come in contact with the flower's pollen. The two characteristics were measured at several different geographic locations and it was found that the length of the fly's proboscis caused strong selective pressures on the length of the corolla of the flower. An increase in proboscis length was selected for, when flowers were longer because it is their primary food source.

=== Coevolutionary arms races ===
Antagonistic interactions (e.g. host-parasite and predator-prey relationships) can often result in coevolutionary trait escalation (i.e. arms races). For example, prey and predator may both evolve faster running speed in order to maximize their fitness.

The plant species Camellia japonica (the Japanese camellia) and its seed predator Curculio camelliae (the camellia weevil) are an example of a coevolutionary arms race. The length of the weevil's rostrum and the thickness of the fruit's pericarp are correlated, meaning that a change in one character prompts a change in the other. The weevil will use its rostrum to burrow into the center of the camellia fruit seeking a place to lay eggs, as the weevil larva feed exclusively on the camellia seeds. This is a main cause of seed damage in the Japanese camellia and, in order to better protect its seeds, the plant will evolve to grow a thicker pericarp. In some areas, the pericarp of these fruits was found to be remarkably woody. The pericarp thickness of the camellia fruit was observed to be thicker in more southern locations than in the north. The areas of Hanyama and Yahazu, Japan are just under nine miles away from each other, but there was an 8 mm difference in pericarp thickness in the camellia populations sampled there. The length of the weevil's rostrum was found to be 5mm longer in the area with thicker fruit. This shows that the survival of the Japanese camellia seeds in the south is dependent upon the thick pericarp as a form of protection. However, northern areas were found to have fruit with infested seeds regardless of thickness of the pericarp. This suggests that the plants in the north were more susceptible to weevil attacks and the two traits are not as strongly correlated as they were in southern areas.
