= Freelance Isn't Free Act =

2017 NYC labor law that protects labor rights for freelancers

New York City Council
- Territorial extent: New York City, US
- Enacted: 16 November 2016

Legislative history
- Introduced by: Brad Lander
- Introduced: 7 December 2015
- Conference committee bill passed by: 26 October 2016

Keywords
- Labor law
- Status: Current legislation

The Freelance Isn't Free Act (FIFA) is a local New York City law passed by the New York City Council in 2016 that protects the labor rights of freelance workers. The bill passed unanimously, after lobbying by the Freelancers Union. The law was officially enacted on May 15, 2017.

The law provides a legal definition for freelance work in New York City and requires companies to provide written contracts for freelance workers whenever the work exceeds $800. Nearly all types of freelance workers are covered by the law except salespeople, attorneys, medical professionals, and government contractors.

Even without a written contract, companies are still required to pay freelancers within 30 days of the work being completed. Finally, companies can't punish workers for exercising the rights granted by the law, and the law allows freelancers to charge penalty fees against companies that violate its clauses. The Act is intended to protect freelancers against clients that unreasonably withhold or delay payment for work.
