= Darryl C. Towns =

American politician

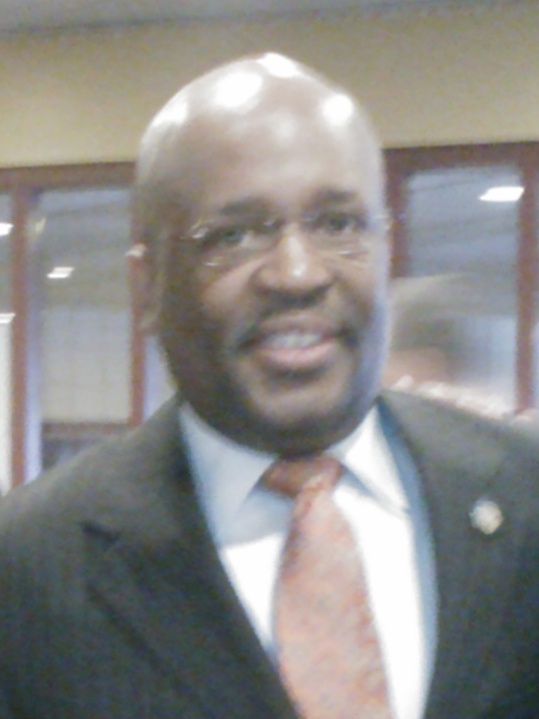
- Towns in 2013

Chair of the New York State Board of Parole
- Incumbent
- Assumed office January 1, 2023
- Governor: Kathy Hochul
- Preceded by: Tina Stanford

Commissioner of the New York State Division of Housing and Community Renewal
- In office April 28, 2011 – June 31, 2015
- Governor: Andrew Cuomo
- Succeeded by: James Rubin

Member of the New York State Assembly from the 54th district
- In office January 6, 1993 – February 10, 2011
- Preceded by: Thomas F. Catapano
- Succeeded by: Rafael Espinal

Personal details
- Born: July 21, 1961 (age 65) Brooklyn, New York, U.S.
- Party: Democratic
- Parents: Edolphus Towns; Gwendolyn Forbes
- Education: North Carolina Agricultural and Technical State University (BS)

Darryl C. Towns (born July 21, 1961) is an American politician and government official, currently serving as chair of the New York State Board of Parole. He was the Commissioner and CEO of New York State Homes and Community Renewal agency from 2011 to 2015. Prior to that, he served in the New York State Assembly representing the 54th district from 1993 to 2011; the district comprises the Brooklyn neighborhoods of Bushwick, Cypress Hills, and East New York.

== Career ==
Towns won the seat in the New York Assembly in September 1992, defeating 10-year incumbent Thomas F. Catapano.

In 1994 Towns was appointed Chairman of the Subcommittee on Mass Transit by Assembly Speaker Sheldon Silver.

From 1981 to 1986, Towns served in the United States Air Force.

Prior to his election to office, Towns also served as Director of Community Affairs at Interfaith Hospital.

In January 2007, Towns was elected chair of the State Legislature's Black, Puerto Rican, Hispanic & Asian Legislative Caucus.

In 2011, Towns vacated his Assembly seat to become Commissioner and CEO of the New York State Homes and Community Renewal agency when appointed by Governor Andrew Cuomo.

In 2022, Governor Kathy Hochul nominated Towns to the State Parole Board. The New York State Senate confirmed his nomination on June 2. On January 1, 2023, Hochul appointed him as chairman.

== Personal life ==
Towns is the son of former Congressman Edolphus Towns, who formerly represented the 11th and 10th Districts in Brooklyn's congressional delegation.

He is married to Karen Boykin-Towns, Senior Counselor at Sard Verbinnen & Co., a global strategic communications consultancy. She also serves as the Vice Chair of the NAACP National Board of Directors.They have two daughters.

He is a graduate of North Carolina Agricultural and Technical State University with a degree in economics.

== 2011 DWI ==
Towns crashed his automobile and damaged the front end driving off a highway ramp in Westchester County, New York, and was arrested by the police for driving while intoxicated early in the morning on July 3, 2011. He was not injured. On September 19, 2011, Towns pleaded guilty to misdemeanor drunk driving charge and has to pay a nearly $900 fine, his driver's license was revoked, and has to complete two alcohol-abuse treatment programs.

New York State Assembly
Preceded by Thomas Catapano	New York State Assembly, 54th District; 1993–2011	Succeeded by Rafael Espinal
