= 1958 United States Senate election in Massachusetts =

- November 4, 1958

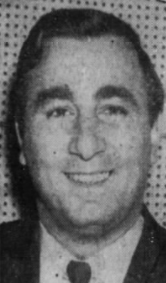
Nominee	John F. Kennedy	Vincent Celeste
Party	Democratic	Republican
Popular vote	1,362,926	488,318
Percentage	73.20%	26.23%
- Kennedy: 40–50% 50–60% 60–70% 70–80% 80–90% >90% Celeste: 40–50% 50–60% 60–70% 70–80%
U.S. senator before election
John F. Kennedy
Democratic
Elected U.S. Senator
John F. Kennedy
Democratic

The 1958 United States Senate election in Massachusetts was held on November 4, 1958. Democratic incumbent John F. Kennedy was reelected to a second six-year term, defeating Republican candidate Vincent J. Celeste.

This election was a rematch of the 1950 election for Massachusetts's 11th congressional district, where John F. Kennedy also defeated Vincent Celeste.

== Democratic primary ==
=== Candidates ===
- John F. Kennedy, incumbent Senator since 1953

=== Results ===
Senator Kennedy was unopposed for renomination.

== Republican primary ==
=== Candidates ===
- Vincent J. Celeste, East Boston attorney and candidate for U.S. Representative in 1950 and 1952

=== Results ===
Celeste was unopposed for the Republican nomination.

== General election ==
=== Candidates ===
- Vincent J. Celeste, East Boston attorney and candidate for U.S. Representative in 1950 and 1952 (Republican)
- Lawrence Gilfedder, perennial candidate (Socialist Labor)
- John F. Kennedy, incumbent Senator since 1953 (Democratic)
- Mark R. Shaw, perennial candidate (Prohibition)

=== Campaign ===
Kennedy was overwhelmingly popular in Massachusetts and the 1958 elections were a wave election favoring the Democratic Party. Celeste's campaign was poorly funded but the candidate worked 17-hour days, running his campaign out of his law offices and attempting to frame the race as one pitting a working-class child of Sicilian immigrants against "that millionaire Jack Kennedy."

The Kennedy campaign had bought and produced thousands of pieces of campaign material with the slogan "Be Proud of Your Vote!" but scrapped them after Celeste's nomination, as Senator Kennedy's father Joe thought the slogan could alienate Italian-Americans and divide the state on ethnic lines.

=== Results ===
Kennedy defeated Celeste by a margin of 874,608 votes; this represented the largest margin of victory in a statewide Massachusetts election up to that point.

United States Senate election in Massachusetts, 1958
Party	Candidate	Votes	%	±%
Democratic	John F. Kennedy (incumbent)	1,362,926	73.20%	▲21.86
Republican	Vincent J. Celeste	488,318	26.23%	▼22.12
Socialist Labor	Lawrence Gilfedder	5,457	0.29%	▼0.09
Prohibition	Mark R. Shaw	5,335	0.29%	▲0.18
Total votes		1,862,036	100.00%	
Democratic hold				
