= Rafael Espinal =

American politician and non-profit executive

- Espinal in 2026

Member of the New York City Council from the 37th district
- In office January 1, 2014 – January 26, 2020
- Preceded by: Erik Martin Dilan
- Succeeded by: Darma Diaz

Member of the New York State Assembly from the 54th district
- In office September 14, 2011 – December 31, 2013
- Preceded by: Darryl C. Towns
- Succeeded by: Erik Martin Dilan

Personal details
- Born: June 30, 1984 (age 42) New York City, New York, U.S.
- Party: Democratic
- Education: Queens College (BA)
- Website: Official website

Rafael L. Espinal Jr. (born June 30, 1984) is an American politician and non-profit executive. A Democrat, he began his political career in the New York State Assembly, representing New York's 54th State Assembly district in Brooklyn from 2011 to 2013. He later served on the New York City Council from 2014 to 2020, representing the 37th district, which includes portions of Bushwick, Cypress Hills, Brownsville and East New York in Brooklyn.

In January 2020, he resigned from the City Council to become President and Executive Director of the Freelancers Union, a national organization advocating for independent workers.

He was appointed by Mayor Zohran Mamdani as Commissioner of the Mayor's Office of Media & Entertainment in January 2026. The office permits and oversees Film & Television production in New York City and serves as a liaison for the city's creative industries and workforce.

== Early life and education ==
Espinal has lived in Brooklyn all his life, while his parents are from the Dominican Republic. He was born in 1984 in Bed-Stuy, and is the third of six children. He was raised in Cypress Hills, attending and graduating from New York City public schools, P.S. 108, I.S. 302, and Franklin K. Lane High School. Espinal attended Queens College and graduated with a bachelor's degree in English.

In 2017 - 2018, Espinal was selected for a MIT CoLab Fellowship. A two year program within the MIT Department of Urban Studies and Planning focused on prospective models for community-driven economic development tied to shared wealth and ownership.

== Career ==
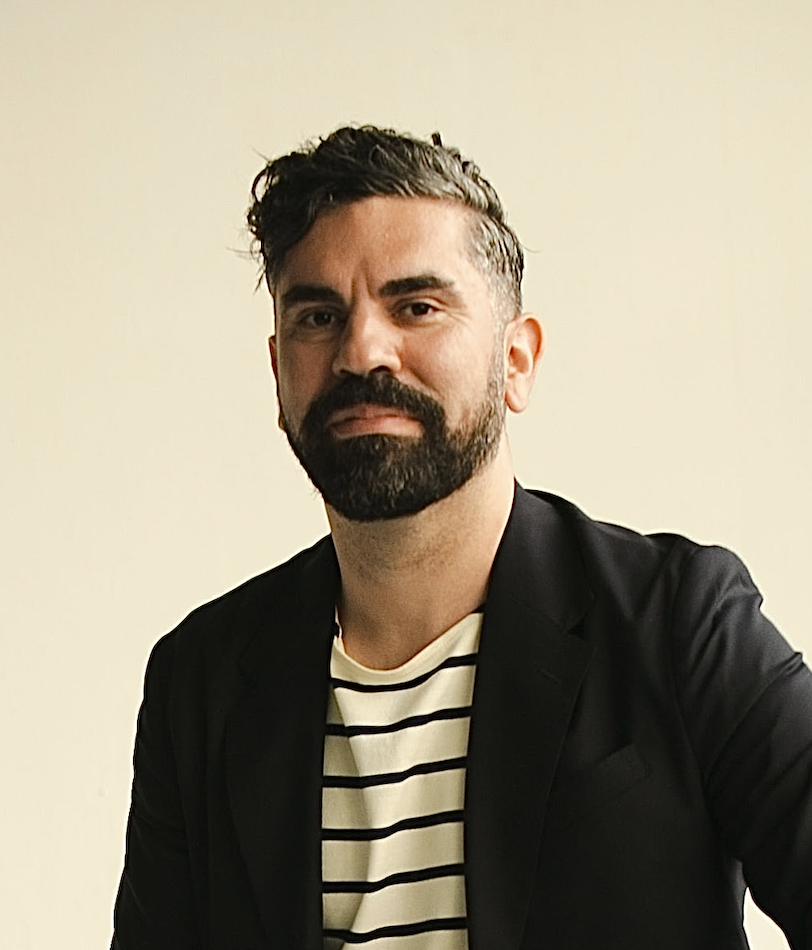
Espinal in 2023

Espinal first worked as an adult literacy teacher. Espinal entered public service as an aide to City Councilmember Erik Martin Dilan, ultimately serving as his chief of staff.

In the 2016 Democratic Party presidential primaries, he was the only New York City Councilmember to endorse Bernie Sanders. He endorsed him again for the 2020 primaries, the first City Councilmember to do so.

In 2017, Espinal was named one of Time Out New York's "New Yorkers of the Year", largely in recognition of his advocacy in repealing the New York City Cabaret Law, enforcement of which disproportionately targeted LGBTQ and ethnic minority venues and creating the city's Office of Nightlife, dedicated to supporting DIY art spaces, music venues, bars and restaurants.

In 2019, Espinal ran in the special election for New York City Public Advocate, following Letitia James's victory in her race for New York State Attorney General. He came in 7th place in a crowded field of 17 candidates, won by fellow Brooklyn City Councilmember Jumaane Williams. The New York Times endorsed Jumaane Williams, but noted on Espinal's career as a City Council Member, "In a 51-member body, Mr. Espinal has been a standout."

Espinal, facing term limits to another term in the City Council, announced plans to run for Brooklyn Borough President in the 2021 election, as Eric Adams, then Brooklyn Borough President, faced term limits. Espinal dropped out of the race in January 2020, and subsequently resigned from the Council entirely.

=== New York State Assembly ===
In his first campaign, Espinal won the open 54th district seat in the New York State Assembly in a special election held on September 13, 2011. The seat was left vacant after Darryl Towns resigned from the post in order to take a position with Governor Andrew Cuomo's administration. The assembly district represents parts of Bushwick, East New York, Bedford-Stuyvesant, Cypress Hills, and Cityline in Brooklyn.

Espinal had endorsements from the Brooklyn Democratic Party, the Republican Party and the Conservative Party of New York State. In a tight race, Espinal (46%) defeated Jesus Gonzalez (35%) running on the Working Families Party line and Deidra Towns (19%) running on her party platform, "Community First".

In 2012, Espinal was named one of City & State's "New York City Rising Stars: 40 Under 40" for his work as New York State Assemblyman.

=== New York City Council ===
In 2013, Espinal opted to leave the state Assembly to run for the New York City Council to succeed Erik Martin Dilan, and won the primary and general to take the seat in 2014.

In 2014 Mayor Bill de Blasio announced an affordable housing plan that would create over 3,000 units of affordable housing in the Cypress Hills, East New York, and Ocean Hill portions of his district. Espinal used the opportunity to advocate for funding to address all of the social and infrastructure issues his community had experienced for decades. While facing opposition from a citywide advocacy group, Espinal was able to secure what some have called the most comprehensive rezoning plan in the City of New York, over a quarter of a billion dollars to address unemployment, crumbling infrastructure, and affordable housing issues. The New York Times endorsed Espinal's move and stated that "Espinal did right by his constituents."

In 2017, Espinal authored a bill to repeal the New York City Cabaret Law, which prohibited musical entertainment in certain public establishments without a license. He also authored legislation to create the nation's first Office of Nightlife, a city agency dedicated to supporting the nightlife economy.

In 2019, Espinal authored legislation requiring all New York City buildings to install solar panels or green roofs as part of New York City's "Green New Deal". He also led on initiatives to ban single-use plastics, secure funding for New York City's first electric school buses, and pass the city's first urban agriculture policy. In December 2019, Espinal authored legislation to require new buildings to include design features to reduce bird–window collisions, including bird-safe glass.

On January 26, 2020, he resigned from the City Council to become the Executive Director and President of Freelancers Union.

=== Freelancers Union ===
In January 2020, Rafael Espinal was appointed Executive Director of the Freelancers Union, a national nonprofit organization advocating for the rights and protections of independent workers. He became the third individual to lead the organization since its founding in 1995.

Under Espinal's leadership, the union expanded its legislative and support initiatives:

- Expansion of the Freelance Isn’t Free Act: Espinal helped expand the Freelance Isn’t Free Act beyond New York City. Originally enacted in NYC in 2017, the law, which creates non-payment protections, and mandates a minimum net pay of 30 days for independent workers, was later adopted in other jurisdictions, including New York State, Illinois, and California, providing freelancers with protections against nonpayment and ensuring the right to timely compensation.
- Freelancers Relief Fund: In response to the COVID-19 pandemic, Espinal oversaw the launch of the Freelancers Relief Fund, which provided emergency cash assistance to freelancers facing income loss.
- Advocacy for portable benefits: Espinal has been a national advocate for the creation of portable benefits systems for independent workers. He has called for policy reforms that decouple benefits like health care and retirement from traditional employment relationships.

=== Commissioner of the Mayor's Office of Media & Entertainment ===
On January 12, 2026, Espinal was appointed Commissioner of the Mayor's Office of Media & Entertainment by Mayor Zohran Mamdani.

== Election history ==
Election history
Location	Year	Election	Results
NY Assembly District 54	2011	Special	√ Rafael Espinal (D) 46.21% Jesus Gonzalez (WFP) 34.61% Deidra Towns (Community) 19.13%
NY Assembly District 54	2012	Democratic Primary	√ Rafael Espinal 65.91% Juan C. Rodriguez 33.82%
NY Assembly District 54	2012	General	√ Rafael Espinal (D) 96.52; Khorshed Chowdhury (R) 3.42%
NYC Council District 37	2013	Democratic Primary	√ Rafael Espinal 45.85% Kimberly Council 31.87% Heriberto Mateo 12.01% Helal A. Sheikh 10.26%
NYC Council District 37	2013	General	√ Rafael Espinal (D) 86.05% Kimberly Council (WFP) 11.73% Michael Freeman-Saulsberre (Conservative) 2.19%
NYC Council District 37	2017	General	√ Rafael Espinal (D) 89.84% Persephone Sarah Jane Smith (Green) 9.98%
New York City Public Advocate	2019	Special	√ Jumaane D. Williams 33.8% Eric Ulrich 19% Melissa Mark-Viverito 11.2% Michael Blake 8.4% Ydanis Rodriguez 6% Dawn Smalls 4.1% Rafael Espinal 3.2% 12 others (including Daniel J. O'Donnell) together 16%
