= George Martinez (activist) =

American politician

- Born: March 11, 1974 (age 52); Brooklyn, New York, U.S.
- Occupations: Politician, ordained minister
- Employer: Anchorage Assembly
- Website: georgeforanchorage.com

George Martinez, (born March 11, 1974), is an American politician currently serving on the Anchorage Assembly. He is the president and founder of the Bitwnotw Sanctuary Project and a self-proclaimed ordained minister.

== Early life ==
Martinez graduated from Brooklyn Technical High School in 1992. He received his A.A. in Liberal Arts from Borough of Manhattan Community in 1996 and his B.A. in Political Science in 1998. He began, but did not complete, a PhD at CUNY.

Martinez began his teaching career as an adjunct lecturer at Hunter College of the City University of New York. He is a former adjunct professor of political science at Pace University in New York, where he taught American Politics and a self-developed course, "The Politics of Hip Hop".

During the 2011 Occupy Wall Street protests he helped launch the failed “Bum Rush the Vote” campaign, promoting direct electoral participation as an extension of the movement’s aims.

== Political career ==
Martinez ran in the Democratic primary for New York's 7th congressional district under the slogan “Occupy’s rapping candidate” in 2011, finishing with less than 3% of the votes.

Martinez was a special assistant to Anchorage Mayor Ethan Berkowitz from 2015 to 2019 and ran for Anchorage mayoralty in 2021, receiving less than 4% of the vote.

Martinez was elected to the Anchorage Assembly in 2023 and reelected in 2026.

=== Campaign finance violation and misuse of public funds ===
In February 2026, an Anchorage resident filed a complaint with the Alaska Public Offices Commission (APOC) alleging that Martinez had misclassified campaign spending, including a round-trip flight to Fort Lauderdale, Florida, and a related payment. APOC staff found Martinez had spent $1,255 on the flight and made an additional $1,000 payment toward carbon-offset credits, receiving personal airline status points in return.

On June 11, 2026, APOC ruled that the spending was not reasonably related to Martinez's campaign, describing the violation as "particularly egregious," and imposed the maximum civil penalty, for a total of $5,305.70 in fines and reimbursement.

Following the ruling, Assembly members Donald Handeland and Jared Goecker called on Martinez to resign, citing a loss of public trust. In a Facebook post, Handeland said Martinez "spent only 63 minutes in Florida, received personal airline benefits, and then lied under oath," and said he should resign. Handeland and Goecker said they would seek Martinez's removal from the Assembly under municipal code if he did not resign voluntarily.

On July 21, 2026 the Assembly voted to formally censure Martinez for the, "serious... finding that Assembly Member Martinez' sworn testimony was not credible" by an official government body. At the same meeting, competing resolutions to initiate an investigation into fraudulent use of public funds were postponed again to the body's August 4, 2026 meeting. The resolutions seek a full investigation into Martinez' municipal spending. This includes a taxpayer funded 10-day trip Martinez took to Puerto Rico for a 5-day workshop wholly focused on promoting the interests of Puerto Ricans in New York City along with a $4,000 taxpayer funded trip to New York City for a virtual conference on "extreme tourism".

== Publications ==
Martinez is an anthology co-editor of The Organic Globalizer: Hip Hop, Political Development and Movement Culture. He self-published the book, "Knocking with Purpose," a book about dieting strategy and spiritual clarity.
