= New York's 18th State Senate district =

American legislative district

Senator
Julia Salazar; D–Bushwick
- Registration: 76.5% Democratic; 4.5% Republican; 16.3% No party preference
- Demographics: 22% White; 20% Black; 49% Hispanic; 6% Asian
- Population (2017): 330,422
- Registered voters: 216,940

New York's 18th State Senate district is one of 63 districts in the New York State Senate. It has been represented by Democrat Julia Salazar since 2019, following her defeat of incumbent Martin Malavé Dilan in the 2018 primary election.

== Geography ==
District 18 is located in northern Brooklyn, including the neighborhoods of Bushwick, Cypress Hills, Greenpoint, Williamsburg, and parts of Bedford-Stuyvesant, Brownsville, and East New York.

The district overlaps with New York's 7th, 8th, and 12th congressional districts, and with the 50th, 53rd, 54th, 55th, 56th, and 60th districts of the New York State Assembly.

== Recent election results ==
=== 2026 ===
2026 New York State Senate election, District 18
Party	Candidate	Votes	%
Democratic	Julia Salazar		
Working Families	Julia Salazar		
Total	Julia Salazar (incumbent)		
Write-in			
Total votes			100.0

=== 2024 ===
2024 New York State Senate election, District 18
Party	Candidate	Votes	%
Democratic	Julia Salazar	54,800	
Working Families	Julia Salazar	13,089	
Total	Julia Salazar (incumbent)	67,889	99.2
Write-in		585	0.8
Total votes		68,474	100.0
Democratic hold			

=== 2022 ===
2022 New York State Senate election, District 18
Party	Candidate	Votes	%
Democratic	Julia Salazar	33,964	
Working Families	Julia Salazar	9,291	
Total	Julia Salazar (incumbent)	43,255	98.6
Write-in		599	0.5
Total votes		43,854	100.0
Democratic hold			

=== 2020 ===
2020 New York State Senate election, District 18
Primary election
Party	Candidate	Votes	%
Democratic	Julia Salazar (incumbent)	29,435	86.8
Democratic	Andy Marte	4,399	13.0
Write-in		95	0.2
Total votes		33,929	100.0
General election
Democratic	Julia Salazar	77,797	
Working Families	Julia Salazar	18,142	
Total	Julia Salazar (incumbent)	95,939	97.5
New Moderate	Daniel Christmann	2,235	2.3
Write-in		258	0.2
Total votes		98,432	100.0
Democratic hold			

=== 2018 ===
2018 New York State Senate election, District 18
Primary election
Party	Candidate	Votes	%
Democratic	Julia Salazar	21,419	58.7
Democratic	Martin Malavé Dilan (incumbent)	14,974	41.0
Write-in		114	0.3
Total votes		36,507	100.0
General election
Democratic	Julia Salazar	71,329	99.2
Write-in		594	0.8
Total votes		71,923	100.0
Democratic hold			

=== 2016 ===
2016 New York State Senate election, District 18
Primary election
Party	Candidate	Votes	%
Democratic	Martin Malavé Dilan (incumbent)	5,844	59.2
Democratic	Debbie Medina	3,988	40.4
Write-in		35	0.4
Total votes		9,867	100.0
General election
Democratic	Martin Malavé Dilan	84,182	
Independence	Martin Malavé Dilan	3,431	
Total	Martin Malavé Dilan (incumbent)	87,613	99.6
Write-in		329	0.4
Total votes		87,942	100.0
Democratic hold			

=== 2014 ===
2014 New York State Senate election, District 18
Primary election
Party	Candidate	Votes	%
Democratic	Martin Malavé Dilan (incumbent)	5,533	57.4
Democratic	Debbie Medina	4,061	42.3
Write-in		329	0.3
Total votes		9,635	100.0
General election
Democratic	Martin Malavé Dilan (incumbent)	21,352	81.3
Working Families	Debbie Medina	4,028	15.3
Conservative	Jonathan Anderson	861	3.3
Write-in		38	0.1
Total votes		26,279	100.0
Democratic hold			

=== 2012 ===
2012 New York State Senate election, District 18
Primary election
Party	Candidate	Votes	%
Democratic	Martin Malavé Dilan (incumbent)	7,245	67.0
Democratic	Jason Otano	3,526	32.6
Write-in		49	0.4
Total votes		10,820	100.0
General election
Democratic	Martin Malavé Dilan (incumbent)	69,749	94.5
Republican	Michael Freeman-Saulsberre	3,195	
Conservative	Michael Freeman-Saulsberre	792	
Total	Michael Freeman-Saulsberre	3,987	5.4
Write-in		101	0.1
Total votes		73,837	100.0
Democratic hold			

=== Federal results in District 18 ===
Year	Office	Results
2020	President	Biden 86.7 – 11.9%
2016	President	Clinton 91.2 – 6.2%
2012	President	Obama 93.7 – 5.1%
2012	Senate	Gillibrand 94.2 – 4.1%
