= Freelancers Union =

US nonprofit organization

- Established: 1995
- Type: Non-profit organization
- Legal status: Active
- Headquarters: New York City, United States
- Executive Director: Rafael Espinal
- Website: www.freelancersunion.org

Freelancers Union is a nonprofit organization based in New York City that provides advocacy, programming and curated insurance benefits for freelancers through partnerships. The organization dessiminates information through monthly meetings. Rafael Espinal became executive director and president in January 2020.

The Freelancers Union is not a trade union nor is it associated with one.

== Membership ==
As of 2013, more than half of the 500,000 nationwide members lived in New York State. They included freelancers, consultants, independent contractors, temps, part-timers, contingent employees, and those who were otherwise self-employed. This segment of workers makes up one-third of the American workforce. Nearly 25,000 people have purchased insurance through the organization's former Freelancers Insurance Company.

Note: The use of "members" is not accurate as the Freelancers Union does not collect membership dues, but is free to join. Without dues, there is no membership list. It can not be ascertained outside of the Freelancers Union site that the nonprofit has any official members.

== History ==
Working Today, a 501(c)(3) nonprofit organization, launched Freelancers Union in 2001 to address the need for health care insurance for workers in nontraditional arrangements. Sara Horowitz founded Working Today in New York City in 1995, in order to represent the needs and concerns of the growing independent workforce. Before founding Working Today–Freelancers Union, Horowitz was a labor law attorney in private practice and a union organizer with SEIU 1199, the National Health and Human Service Employees Union.

Freelancers Union has created a portable benefits delivery system, linking benefits to individuals rather than to employers, so independent workers can maintain benefits as they move from job to job and project to project.

Freelancers Union also provides its members with online tools, business management information, networking opportunities, group discount terms with various vendors or partners, and other assistance in working successfully as independents. Membership is free of charge, as is members' access to the union's meetings, tools and basic information. Members pay fees for certain events, seminars and other services, as well as premiums if they elect to buy health insurance through the union.

In 2003, a re-branding of Working Today’s Portable Benefits Network was launched. The new “pilot” program, called The Freelancers Union, offers freelancers membership services like affordable health care, life insurance, and a forum for discussion on what freelancing is like in the current economy. Though freelancers could not officially unionize, the group worked to provide a “collective” platform for advocacy, and it was geared to appeal specifically to its namesake: freelancers. By 2012 the Freelancers Union had a marketing campaign directed at freelancers in New York City, using slogans that invoked both justice and individualism.

Freelancers Insurance Company (FIC) was founded in 2008. To create it, Horowitz needed to persuade investors to put up $17 million. The Rockefeller Foundation and others gave $7 million in grants, and additional foundations joined in, agreeing to lend the rest at a 3 percent interest rate.” FIC began offering health insurance to members of Freelancers Union on January 1, 2009. As a fully-licensed insurance company in the state of New York, FIC sold a group insurance policy to Freelancers Union, thereby covering eligible members of Freelancers Union living in New York. FIC offered 5 health plan designs, including three copay-based designs and two high deductible plans. All plans were PPOs (including out of network coverage) using a nationwide network provided through BlueCross BlueShield. Freelancers could enroll in an FIC plan by first demonstrating to Freelancers Union that they met certain criteria – continuing the same process that had been in place for years under Freelancers Union's Portable Benefits Network.

A newly-formed political action committee made its political debut in September 2009. Canvassing potential candidates via questionnaire in order to find the right people to align and endorse. “We started the PAC because if you want to change you have to be politically involved."

The “Get Paid, Not Played” Campaign was launched in October 2010 and marked the Freelancers Union’s latest effort to publicize the repercussions of late or lack of payment to freelancers. The World’s Longest Invoice campaign followed, a tandem effort to create publicity in order to pass the “Freelancer Payment Protection Act, which [gives] the self-employed many of the same remedies for non-payment that regular employees now have, including the right to file grievances with the state department of labor."

The Freelancers Union-funded medical clinics opened in 2013. The spaces were created to function ”as the first medical home and serve members of the Freelancers Union Insurance Company." With yoga, iPads and no co-pays and deductibles, the 408 Jay Street clinic, housed in a renovated 6,000 square-foot building, offered same-day services, nutrition and cooking classes as well as text messaging communications from doctors.

The Freelancers Union created the National Benefits Program that same year with a 2014 launch, a program providing “a curated selection of health insurance options for freelancers across the country." This new tool, the first of its kind, allowed freelancers to search by zip code for benefits such as “401k plan, dental insurance, disability insurance, life insurance, liability insurance and health insurance that are available to independent workers in their area." Health insurance was scheduled to become available via platform in all 50 states by “the November national enrollment period." At the end of 2014, Freelancers Insurance Company ended offering insurance coverage.

In 2016, Uber announced a new “groundbreaking agreement to bring needed supports to Uber drivers in New York City." A new association, The Independent Driver’s Guild, ”was created to “push for labor protections for the company’s independent contractors.” The Freelancers Union was chosen to “advise Uber on strategies for building a nationwide portable benefits platform for drivers, bringing safety net protections to tens of thousands of hardworking men and women."

== Policy ==
Under federal labor laws, the Freelancers Union cannot engage in collective bargaining over wages or working conditions because it is not a certified union. The entertainment unions can today, because they were grandfathered in. Collective bargaining is a "moment in history", as Horowitz told Lehrer. Judging by listener phone calls, Lehrer suggested that the biggest problem freelancers had with the Freelancers Union (at the time, in 2007) was that they could not meet the organization's definition of freelancer, which requires that they work at least 20 hours a week in one of seven industries typically associated with independent workers.

== Honors ==
Working Today – Freelancers Union was recognized in 2004-2006 as a leading social entrepreneur by Fast Company magazine.

In 2013, Horowitz became a member of the New York Federal Reserve board. Chosen for the unique constituency the Freelancers Union represents economically, “Horowitz was appointed in 2013 as a Class C director and in 2014 she began to serve as deputy chair. As of 2017 she is a "Class C Director Chair."

== National benefits platform ==
Freelancers Union offers health insurance as a non-profit health insurance brokerage. In 2001, it created an infrastructure platform known as the Portable Benefits Network (PBN) which provides health insurance to independent workers, as well as offers life and disability insurance, financial services, resources, and discounts and dental, term life, liability, and vision. In 2008, it replaced PBN with the Freelancers Insurance Company (a wholly owned for-profit company) to offer insurance to its members.

In 2014, Horowitz announced a rebranding of the PBN at the Clinton Global Initiative now called the National Benefits Platform.

== Freelance contract ==
In 2017, the Freelancers Union launched the first standard freelance contract in collaboration with And Co. The contract is built around the Freelance Isn't Free Act, a New York City law passed to protect freelancers.

== Criticism ==
Some traditional unionists say that Freelancers Union is an association, not a union, and so it will not be able to achieve significant gains for workers. Freelancers Union does not negotiate contracts with employers nor represent freelancers when they have grievances, and freelancers have no employee bargaining rights under the National Labor Relations Act.

One of the main benefits that Freelancers Union provided for its members was health insurance, but they do not qualify for Obamacare. The cost of selling individual insurance requires more overhead than group insurance. "Policies that provide the exact same coverage to someone working for a large employer will cost more for an individual," says the Center for American Progress's website for college students. "Even worse, insurers can pick and choose preexisting conditions and then deny coverage for those deemed too costly to cover." A Center for American Progress fellow estimated the average difference in administrative costs alone to be $300 per year between individual and group insurance. The Freelancers Union acknowledges those problems with the open market but asserts that its large-group bargaining power, its captive insurance company's obligation to grant coverage, and its non-profit marketing role all serve as effective remedies.

In January 2008, Freelancers Union was criticized by both its members and the press when its new Freelancers Insurance Company became the entity providing coverage to members. At that time, the Union dropped Empire Blue Cross Blue Shield in favor of a range of new options, mostly more expensive, with Anthem BC/BS remaining only as claims processing agent. Members then faced the complexity inherent in comparing the limits, exclusions, co-payments, co-insurance percentages, and annual and other deductibles of the various new options with those of the old plans. Throughout this process, some members were even inadvertently dropped altogether.

== See also ==
- Open-source unionism
- Gig economy
