= 190th New York State Legislature =

New York state legislative session

←	189th	191st	→
- New York State Capitol (2009)

Overview
- Legislative body: New York State Legislature
- Jurisdiction: New York, United States
- Term: January 1, 1993 – December 31, 1994

Senate
- Members: 61
- President: Lt. Gov. Stan Lundine (D)
- Temporary President: Ralph J. Marino (R)
- Party control: Republican (35–26)

Assembly
- Members: 150
- Speaker: Saul Weprin (D), until February 11, 1994; Sheldon Silver (D), from February 11, 1994
- Party control: Democratic; 1993: (101–49); 1994: (100–50)

Sessions
- 1st: January 6 – July 8, 1993
- 2nd: January 5 – July 3, 1994

The 190th New York State Legislature, consisting of the New York State Senate and the New York State Assembly, met from January 6, 1993, to December 31, 1994, during the eleventh and twelfth years of Mario Cuomo's governorship, in Albany.

== Background ==
Under the provisions of the New York Constitution of 1938 and the U.S. Supreme Court decision to follow the One man, one vote rule, re-apportioned in 1992 by the Legislature, 61 Senators and 150 assemblymen were elected in single-seat districts for two-year terms. Senate and Assembly districts consisted of approximately the same number of inhabitants, the area being apportioned contiguously without restrictions regarding county boundaries.

At this time there were two major political parties: the Democratic Party and the Republican Party. The Conservative Party, the Right to Life Party, the Liberal Party, the Libertarian Party, the New Alliance Party, the Natural Law Party, and the Socialist Workers Party also nominated tickets.

== Elections ==
The 1992 New York state election was held on November 3. The only statewide elective office up for election was a U.S. Senator from New York. Republican Al D'Amato was re-elected with Conservative and Right-to-Life endorsement. The approximate party strength at this election, as expressed by the vote for U.S. Senator, was: Democrats 2,943,000; Republicans 2,653,000; Conservatives 289,000; Right to Life 225,000; Liberals 143,000; Libertarians 109,000; New Alliance 57,000; and Socialist Workers 17,000.

25 of the sitting 28 women members of the legislature—State Senators Nancy Larraine Hoffmann (Democrat), of Syracuse; Olga A. Méndez (Democrat), of East Harlem; Velmanette Montgomery (Democrat), of Brooklyn; Suzi Oppenheimer (Democrat), of Mamaroneck; and Ada L. Smith (Democrat), of Queens; and State Representatives Nancy Calhoun (Republican), of Blooming Grove; Joan Christensen (Democrat), of Syracuse; Barbara M. Clark (Demo6), of Queens; Elizabeth Connelly (Dem.), of Staten Island; Vivian E. Cook (Democrat) of Queens; Gloria Davis (Democrat), of the Bronx; Eileen C. Dugan (Democrat), of Brooklyn; Deborah J. Glick (Democrat), of Manhattan; Aurelia Greene (Democrat), of the Bronx; Earlene Hill Hooper (Dem.), of Hempstead; Rhoda S. Jacobs (Democrat), of Brooklyn; Cynthia Jenkins (Dem.), a librarian of Queens; Susan V. John (Democrat), of Rochester; Nettie Mayersohn (Democrat), of Queens; Patricia McGee (Rep.), of Franklinville; Catherine Nolan (Democrat), of Queens; Audrey Pheffer (Democrat), of Queens; Cecile D. Singer (Rep.), of Yonkers; Frances T. Sullivan (Republican), of Fulton; and Helene Weinstein (Democrat), a lawyer of Brooklyn—were re-elected. Nellie R. Santiago (Democrat), of Brooklyn; and Mary Ellen Jones (Dem.), of Irondequoit, were also elected to the State Senate. RoAnn Destito (Democrat), of Rome; Donna Ferrara (Republican), a lawyer of Westbury; Sandy Galef (Dem.), of Ossining; Eileen Hickey (Dem.), a registered nurse of Rhinebeck; Audrey Hochberg (Democrat), of Scarsdale; Elizabeth C. Hoffman (Rep.), of North Tonawanda; and Naomi C. Matusow (Democrat), a lawyer of Armonk; were also elected to the Assembly.

On February 16, 1993, Chloe Ann O'Neil (Rep.), an elementary school teacher of Parishville, was elected to fill a vacancy in the Assembly.

The 1993 New York state election was held on November 2. Two vacancies in the State Senate and two vacancies in the Assembly were filled. Mary Lou Rath (Rep.), of Williamsville, was elected to fill one of the vacancies in the Senate; and Patricia Acampora (Rep.), of Mattituck, was elected to fill one of the vacancies in the Assembly.

On February 15, 1994, Melinda Katz (Lib.), a lawyer of Queens; and Carmen E. Arroyo (Dem.), of the Bronx; were elected to fill vacancies in the Assembly. Thus the 190th Legislature ended having 39 women members, surpassing the previous record of 28 in the 189th New York State Legislature (1991–1992).

== Sessions ==
The Legislature met for the first regular session (the 216th) at the State Capitol in Albany on January 6, 1993; and recessed indefinitely on July 8.

Saul Weprin (Dem.) was re-elected Speaker of the Assembly.

Ralph J. Marino (Rep.) was re-elected Temporary President of the Senate.

On February 18, 1993, State Comptroller Edward Regan (Rep.) tendered his resignation, effective April 30. On May 5, the Legislature elected Carl McCall (Dem.) to fill the vacancy, with a vote of 121 to 2, the Republicans boycotting the election.

On September 8, 1993, Attorney General Robert Abrams (Dem.) tendered his resignation, effective December 31. The Legislature met again in November and December. On December 16, 1993, Assemblyman G. Oliver Koppell was elected by the Legislature to fill the vacancy.

The Legislature met for the second regular session (the 217th) at the State Capitol in Albany on January 5, 1994; and recessed indefinitely on July 3.

On January 19, Speaker Weprin suffered a stroke, and was hospitalized. On January 24, 1994, Sheldon Silver (Dem.) was elected as Interim Speaker. Weprin died on February 11, and Silver was subsequently elected as Speaker.

== State Senate ==
=== Senators ===
The asterisk (*) denotes members of the previous Legislature who continued in office as members of this Legislature. George E. Pataki and Michael F. Nozzolio changed from the Assembly to the Senate.

Note: For brevity, the chairmanships omit the words "...the Committee on (the)..."

District	Senator	Party	Notes
1st	Kenneth LaValle*	Republican	
2nd	James J. Lack*	Republican	
3rd	Caesar Trunzo*	Republican	
4th	Owen H. Johnson*	Republican	
5th	Ralph J. Marino*	Republican	re-elected Temporary President
6th	Kemp Hannon*	Republican	
7th	Michael J. Tully Jr.*	Republican	Chairman of Health
8th	Norman J. Levy*	Republican	Chairman of Transportation
9th	Dean Skelos*	Republican	
10th	Alton R. Waldon Jr.*	Democrat	
11th	Frank Padavan*	Republican	
12th	Ada L. Smith*	Democrat	
13th	Emanuel R. Gold*	Democrat	
14th	George Onorato*	Democrat	
15th	Serphin R. Maltese*	Cons./Rep.	
16th	Leonard P. Stavisky*	Democrat	
17th	Nellie R. Santiago	Democrat	
18th	Velmanette Montgomery*	Democrat	
19th	Howard E. Babbush*	Democrat	
20th	Marty Markowitz*	Democrat	
21st	Donald Halperin*	Democrat	on October 4, 1993, appointed as NYS Commissioner of Housing
21st	Carl Kruger	Democrat	on February 15, 1994, elected to fill vacancy
22nd	Martin M. Solomon*	Democrat	
23rd	Christopher J. Mega*	Republican	in July 1993, appointed to the New York Court of Claims
23rd	Robert DiCarlo	Republican	on November 2, 1993, elected to fill vacancy
24th	John J. Marchi*	Republican	
25th	Martin Connor*	Democrat	
26th	Roy M. Goodman*	Republican	
27th	Manfred Ohrenstein*	Democrat	Minority Leader
28th	Olga A. Méndez*	Democrat	
29th	David Paterson*	Democrat	
30th	Franz S. Leichter*	Democrat	
31st	Efrain Gonzalez Jr.*	Democrat	
32nd	Pedro Espada Jr.	Democrat	
33rd	Joseph L. Galiber*	Democrat	
34th	Guy J. Velella*	Republican	
35th	Nicholas A. Spano*	Republican	
36th	Suzi Oppenheimer*	Democrat	
37th	George E. Pataki*	Republican	on November 8, 1994, elected Governor of New York
38th	Joseph R. Holland*	Republican	
39th	William J. Larkin Jr.*	Republican	
40th	Charles D. Cook*	Republican	
41st	Stephen M. Saland*	Republican	
42nd	Howard C. Nolan Jr.*	Democrat	
43rd	Joseph Bruno*	Republican	
44th	Hugh T. Farley*	Republican	Chairman of Banks
45th	Ronald B. Stafford*	Republican	Chairman of Finance
46th	James W. Wright	Republican	
47th	William R. Sears*	Republican	
48th	Nancy Larraine Hoffmann*	Democrat	
49th	John A. DeFrancisco	Republican	
50th	James L. Seward*	Republican	
51st	Thomas W. Libous*	Republican	
52nd	Randy Kuhl*	Republican	
53rd	Michael F. Nozzolio*	Republican	
54th	Richard A. Dollinger	Democrat	
55th	Mary Ellen Jones	Democrat	
56th	Jess J. Present*	Republican	
57th	Anthony M. Masiello*	Democrat	on November 2, 1993, elected Mayor of Buffalo
57th	Anthony Nanula	Democrat	on February 15, 1994, elected to fill vacancy
58th	William Stachowski*	Democrat	
59th	Dale M. Volker*	Republican	
60th	John B. Sheffer II*	Republican	resigned on September 19, 1993, to teach at the University at Buffalo
60th	Mary Lou Rath	Republican	on November 2, 1993, elected to fill vacancy
61st	John B. Daly*	Republican	

=== Employees ===
- Secretary: Stephen F. Sloan

== State Assembly ==
=== Assembly members ===
The asterisk (*) denotes members of the previous Legislature who continued in office as members of this Legislature.

Note: For brevity, the chairmanships omit the words "...the Committee on (the)..."

District	Assembly member	Party	Notes
1st	Joseph Sawicki Jr.*	Republican	resigned on September 15, 1993
1st	Patricia Acampora	Republican	on November 2, 1993, elected to fill vacancy
2nd	John L. Behan*	Republican	
3rd	Icilio W. Bianchi Jr.*	Democrat	
4th	Steve Englebright*	Democrat	
5th	Paul E. Harenberg*	Democrat	
6th	Robert C. Wertz*	Republican	
7th	Thomas F. Barraga*	Republican	
8th	John C. Cochrane*	Republican	on November 2, 1993, elected as Suffolk County Treasurer
8th	Phil Boyle	Republican	on February 15, 1994, elected to fill vacancy
9th	John J. Flanagan*	Republican	
10th	James D. Conte*	Republican	
11th	Robert K. Sweeney*	Democrat	
12th	Philip B. Healey*	Republican	
13th	David Sidikman*	Democrat	
14th	Frederick E. Parola*	Republican	on November 2, 1993, elected as Nassau County Comptroller
14th	Marc Herbst	Republican	on February 15, 1994, elected to fill vacancy
15th	Donna Ferrara	Republican	
16th	Thomas DiNapoli*	Democrat	
17th	Michael Balboni*	Republican	
18th	Earlene Hill Hooper*	Democrat	
19th	Charles J. O'Shea*	Republican	
20th	Harvey Weisenberg*	Democrat	
21st	Gregory R. Becker*	Republican	
22nd	Vincent T. Muscarella*	Republican	
23rd	Audrey Pheffer*	Democrat	
24th	Saul Weprin*	Democrat	re-elected Speaker; died on February 11, 1994
24th	Mark Weprin	Democrat	on March 24, 1994, elected to fill vacancy
25th	Brian M. McLaughlin	Democrat	
26th	Douglas Prescott*	Republican	
27th	Nettie Mayersohn*	Democrat	
28th	Alan G. Hevesi*	Democrat	on November 2, 1993, elected as New York City Comptroller
28th	Melinda Katz	Liberal	on February 15, 1994, elected to fill vacancy
29th	Cynthia Jenkins*	Democrat	
30th	Joseph Crowley*	Democrat	
31st	Gregory W. Meeks	Democrat	
32nd	Vivian E. Cook*	Democrat	
33rd	Barbara M. Clark*	Democrat	
34th	Ivan C. Lafayette*	Democrat	
35th	Jeffrion L. Aubry*	Democrat	
36th	Denis J. Butler*	Democrat	
37th	Catherine Nolan*	Democrat	
38th	Anthony S. Seminerio*	Democrat	
39th	Anthony J. Genovesi*	Democrat	
40th	Edward Griffith*	Democrat	
41st	Helene Weinstein*	Democrat	Chairwoman of Judiciary (1994)
42nd	Rhoda S. Jacobs*	Democrat	Chairwoman of Social Services
43rd	Clarence Norman Jr.*	Democrat	
44th	James F. Brennan*	Democrat	
45th	Daniel L. Feldman*	Democrat	
46th	Howard L. Lasher*	Democrat	on November 2, 1993, elected to the New York City Council
46th	Jules Polonetsky	Democrat	on February 15, 1994, elected to fill vacancy
47th	Frank J. Barbaro*	Democrat	
48th	Dov Hikind*	Democrat	
49th	Peter J. Abbate Jr.*	Democrat	
50th	Joseph R. Lentol*	Democrat	Chairman of Codes
51st	Javier A. Nieves	Democrat	
52nd	Eileen C. Dugan*	Democrat	Chairwoman of Commerce
53rd	Vito J. Lopez*	Democrat	
54th	Darryl C. Towns	Democrat	
55th	William F. Boyland*	Democrat	
56th	Albert Vann*	Democrat	
57th	Roger L. Green*	Independent	
58th	N. Nick Perry	Democrat	
59th	Elizabeth Connelly*	Democrat	
60th	Eric N. Vitaliano*	Democrat	
61st	Robert A. Straniere*	Republican	
62nd	Sheldon Silver*	Democrat	Chairman of Ways and Means, until February 25, 1994; Interim Speaker from January 24 to February 11, 1994; elected Speaker on February 11, 1994
63rd	Steven Sanders*	Democrat	
64th	Richard N. Gottfried*	Democrat	
65th	Alexander B. Grannis*	Democrat	
66th	Deborah J. Glick*	Democrat	
67th	Scott Stringer	Democrat	
68th	Angelo Del Toro*	Democrat	Chairman of Education; died on December 30, 1994
69th	Edward C. Sullivan*	Democrat	
70th	Keith L. T. Wright	Democrat	
71st	Herman D. Farrell Jr.*	Democrat	Chairman of Banks, until February 25, 1994; Chairman of Ways and Means, from February 25, 1994
72nd	John Brian Murtaugh*	Democrat	
73rd	John Ravitz*	Republican	
74th	David Rosado*	Democrat	on November 2, 1993, elected to the New York City Council
74th	Carmen E. Arroyo	Democrat	on February 15, 1994, elected to fill vacancy
75th	Hector L. Diaz*	Democrat	
76th	Peter M. Rivera	Democrat	
77th	Aurelia Greene*	Democrat	
78th	Roberto Ramirez*	Democrat	
79th	Gloria Davis*	Democrat	
80th	George Friedman*	Democrat	
81st	G. Oliver Koppell*	Democrat	Chairman of Judiciary (1993); on December 16, 1993, elected as New York Attorney General
81st	Jeffrey Dinowitz	Democrat	on February 15, 1994, elected to fill vacancy
82nd	Stephen B. Kaufman*	Democrat	
83rd	Larry Seabrook*	Democrat	
84th	J. Gary Pretlow	Democrat	
85th	Ronald C. Tocci*	Democrat	
86th	Richard L. Brodsky*	Democrat	
87th	Cecile D. Singer*	Republican	
88th	Audrey Hochberg	Democrat	
89th	Naomi C. Matusow	Democrat	
90th	Sandy Galef	Democrat	
91st	Vincent Leibell*	Republican	
92nd	Alexander J. Gromack*	Democrat	
93rd	Samuel Colman*	Democrat	
94th	Nancy Calhoun*	Republican	
95th	John Bonacic*	Republican	
96th	Lawrence E. Bennett*	Democrat	
97th	Eileen Hickey	Democrat	
98th	Jacob E. Gunther III	Democrat	
99th	Glenn E. Warren	Republican	
100th	Robert A. D'Andrea*	Republican	
101st	Kevin Cahill	Democrat	
102nd	John Faso*	Republican	
103rd	James Tedisco*	Republican	
104th	John McEneny	Democrat	
105th	Paul D. Tonko*	Democrat	
106th	Ronald Canestrari*	Democrat	
107th	Arnold W. Proskin*	Republican	
108th	Pat M. Casale	Republican	
109th	James P. King*	Republican	
110th	Chris Ortloff*	Republican	
111th	Bill Magee*	Democrat	
112th	vacant		Assemblyman-elect John G. A. O'Neil died on December 10, 1992
112th	Chloe Ann O'Neil	Republican	on February 16, 1993, elected to fill vacancy
113th	Anthony J. Casale*	Republican	
114th	H. Robert Nortz*	Republican	
115th	David R. Townsend Jr.*	Republican	
116th	RoAnn Destito	Democrat	
117th	Frances T. Sullivan*	Republican	
118th	Michael J. Bragman*	Democrat	Majority Leader from September 8, 1993
119th	Joan Christensen*	Democrat	
120th	Joseph A. Nicoletti*	Democrat	
121st	Harold C. Brown Jr.*	Republican	
122nd	Clarence D. Rappleyea Jr.*	Republican	Minority Leader
123rd	Richard H. Miller*	Republican	
124th	James R. Tallon Jr.*	Democrat	Majority Leader; resigned effective September 8, 1993
124th	Robert J. Warner	Republican	on November 2, 1993, elected to fill vacancy
125th	Martin A. Luster*	Democrat	
126th	Daniel J. Fessenden	Republican	
127th	George H. Winner Jr.*	Republican	
128th	Bob Oaks	Republican	
129th	Frank G. Talomie Sr.*	Republican	died on December 1, 1993
129th	Craig J. Doran	Republican	on February 15, 1994, elected to fill vacancy
130th	Donald R. Davidsen*	Republican	
131st	Susan V. John*	Democrat	
132nd	Joseph D. Morelle*	Democrat	
133rd	David F. Gantt*	Democrat	
134th	Joseph Robach*	Democrat	
135th	James S. Alesi	Republican	
136th	Jerry Johnson	Republican	
137th	Charles H. Nesbitt	Republican	
138th	Joseph T. Pillittere*	Democrat	
139th	Elizabeth C. Hoffman	Republican	
140th	Robin L. Schimminger*	Democrat	
141st	Arthur O. Eve*	Democrat	
142nd	Richard R. Anderson*	Republican	
143rd	Paul Tokasz*	Democrat	
144th	Sam Hoyt*	Democrat	
145th	Richard J. Keane*	Democrat	
146th	Francis J. Pordum*	Democrat	
147th	Thomas M. Reynolds*	Republican	
148th	Vincent J. Graber Sr.*	Democrat	
149th	Patricia McGee*	Republican	
150th	William L. Parment*	Democrat	

=== Employees ===
- Clerk: Francine Misasi

== Sources ==
- The 1992 Elections – New York Legislature – Incumbency Keeps Balance Intact by Sam Howe Verhovek, in The New York Times on November 5, 1992
- Weprin Picks Leadership Of Committees by James Dao, in The New York Times on January 12, 1993
