= 187th New York State Legislature =

New York state legislative session

←	186th	188th	→
- New York State Capitol (2009)

Overview
- Legislative body: New York State Legislature
- Jurisdiction: New York, United States
- Term: January 1, 1987 – December 31, 1988

Senate
- Members: 61
- President: Lt. Gov. Stan Lundine (D)
- Temporary President: Warren M. Anderson (R)
- Party control: Republican (35–26)

Assembly
- Members: 150
- Speaker: Mel Miller (D)
- Party control: Democratic; 1987: (94–56); 1988: (93–57)

Sessions
- 1st: January 7 – July 11, 1987
- 2nd: January 6 – August 25, 1988
- 3rd: November 28 – December 1, 1988
- 4th: December 28, 1988 –

The 187th New York State Legislature, consisting of the New York State Senate and the New York State Assembly, met from January 7, 1987, to December 31, 1988, during the fifth and sixth years of Mario Cuomo's governorship, in Albany.

== Background ==
Under the provisions of the New York Constitution of 1938 and the U.S. Supreme Court decision to follow the One man, one vote rule, re-apportioned in 1982 by the Legislature, 61 Senators and 150 assemblymen were elected in single-seat districts for two-year terms. Senate and Assembly districts consisted of approximately the same number of inhabitants, the area being apportioned contiguously without restrictions regarding county boundaries.

At this time there were two major political parties: the Democratic Party and the Republican Party. The Conservative Party, the Right to Life Party, the Liberal Party, the New Alliance Party and the Socialist Workers Party also nominated tickets.

== Elections ==
The 1986 New York state election, was held on November 4. Governor Mario Cuomo was re-elected, and Congressman Stan Lundine was elected Lieutenant Governor, both Democrats. The elections to the other three statewide elective offices resulted in the re-election of the three incumbent officeholders: a Republican Comptroller, a Democratic Attorney General and a Republican U.S. Senator. The approximate party strength at this election, as expressed by the vote for Governor, was: Democrats 2,655,000; Republicans 1,212,000; Conservatives 152,000; Right to Life 131,000; Liberals 120,000; New Alliance 24,000. The Socialist Workers' candidate for U.S. Senator polled about 7,300 votes.

21 of the 24 women members of the previous legislature—State Senators Mary B. Goodhue (Rep.), a lawyer of Mount Kisco; Nancy Larraine Hoffmann (Dem.), of Syracuse; Olga A. Méndez (Dem.), of East Harlem; Velmanette Montgomery (Dem.), of Brooklyn; and Suzi Oppenheimer (Dem.), of Mamaroneck; and Assemblywomen Elizabeth Connelly (Dem.), of Staten Island; Pinny Cooke (Rep.), of Rochester; Geraldine L. Daniels (Dem.), of the Bronx; Gloria Davis (Dem.), of the Bronx; Eileen C. Dugan (Dem.), of Brooklyn; Aurelia Greene (Dem.), of the Bronx; Rhoda S. Jacobs (Dem.), of Brooklyn; Cynthia Jenkins (Dem.), a librarian of Queens; Gerdi E. Lipschutz (Dem.), of Queens; Helen M. Marshall (Dem.), a teacher and librarian of Queens; Nettie Mayersohn (Dem.), of Queens; Mary M. McPhillips (Dem.), of Middletown; Catherine Nolan (Dem.), of Queens; Barbara Patton (Dem.), a lawyer of Hempstead; Toni Rettaliata (Rep.), of Huntington; and Helene Weinstein (Dem.), a lawyer of Brooklyn—were re-elected. Barbara M. Clark (Dem.), of Queens, was also elected to the Assembly.

On April 28, 1987, Audrey Pheffer (Dem.), of Queens, was elected to fill the vacancy in the Assembly caused by the resignation of Gerdi E. Lipschutz.

On June 16, 1987, Patricia McGee (Rep.), of Franklinville, was elected to fill a vacancy in the Assembly.

The 1987 New York state election was held on November 3. Assemblywoman Toni Rettaliata (Rep.) was elected as Supervisor of the Town of Huntington.

On March 15, 1988, Earlene Hill Hooper (Dem.), of Hempstead, was elected to fill the vacancy in the Assembly caused by the appointment of Barbara Patton to the NYS Workers' Compensation Board. Thus a total of 25 women were members of this Legislature, but not more than 23 at the same time.

== Sessions ==
The Legislature met for the first regular session (the 210th) at the State Capitol in Albany on January 7, 1987; and recessed indefinitely in the morning of July 11.

Mel Miller (Dem.) was elected Speaker of the Assembly.

Warren M. Anderson (Rep.) was re-elected Temporary President of the Senate.

The Legislature met for the second regular session (the 211th) at the State Capitol in Albany on January 6, 1988; and recessed indefinitely in the morning of August 25.

The Legislature met again from November 28, to December 1, 1988. This session was called, among other issues, to consider legislation concerning the Shoreham Nuclear Power Plant.

The Legislature met again on December 28, 1988, to increase the salaries of the next session's state legislators, and the state commissioners.

== State Senate ==
=== Senators ===
The asterisk (*) denotes members of the previous Legislature who continued in office as members of this Legislature. Nicholas A. Spano and Randy Kuhl changed from the Assembly to the Senate.

Note: For brevity, the chairmanships omit the words "...the Committee on (the)..."

District	Senator	Party	Notes
1st	Kenneth LaValle*	Rep./Cons.	
2nd	James J. Lack*	Rep./Cons.	
3rd	Caesar Trunzo*	Rep./Cons.	
4th	Owen H. Johnson*	Rep./Cons.	
5th	Ralph J. Marino*	Rep./Cons.	
6th	John R. Dunne*	Rep./Cons.	Chairman of Judiciary; Deputy Majority Leader
7th	Michael J. Tully Jr.*	Rep./Cons.	
8th	Norman J. Levy*	Rep./Cons.	Chairman of Transportation
9th	Dean Skelos*	Rep./Cons.	
10th	Andrew Jenkins*	Democrat	
11th	Frank Padavan*	Rep./Cons.	
12th	Leonard P. Stavisky*	Dem./Rep./Lib.	
13th	Emanuel R. Gold*	Democrat	
14th	George Onorato*	Democrat	
15th	Martin J. Knorr*	Rep./Cons./RTL	
16th	Jeremy S. Weinstein*	Dem./Lib.	
17th	Howard E. Babbush*	Dem./Lib.	
18th	Donald Halperin*	Democrat	
19th	Martin M. Solomon*	Democrat	
20th	Thomas J. Bartosiewicz*	Democrat	
21st	Marty Markowitz*	Democrat	
22nd	Velmanette Montgomery*	Dem./Lib.	
23rd	Christopher J. Mega*	Rep./Cons.	
24th	John J. Marchi*	Rep./Dem./Lib.	Chairman of Finance
25th	Martin Connor*	Dem./Lib.	
26th	Roy M. Goodman*	Rep./Lib.	
27th	Manfred Ohrenstein*	Dem./Lib.	Minority Leader
28th	Franz S. Leichter*	Dem./Lib.	
29th	David Paterson*	Democrat	
30th	Olga A. Méndez*	Dem./Lib.	
31st	Joseph L. Galiber*	Dem./Lib.	
32nd	Israel Ruiz Jr.*	Dem./Lib.	
33rd	Abraham Bernstein*	Dem./Lib.	
34th	Guy J. Velella*	Rep./Cons./RTL	
35th	Nicholas A. Spano*	Rep./Cons.	
36th	Suzi Oppenheimer*	Dem./Lib.	
37th	Mary B. Goodhue*	Rep./Cons.	
38th	Eugene Levy*	Rep./Cons.	
39th	Richard E. Schermerhorn*	Rep./Cons.	
40th	Charles D. Cook*	Rep./Cons.	
41st	Jay P. Rolison Jr.*	Rep./Cons.	
42nd	Howard C. Nolan Jr.*	Democrat	
43rd	Joseph Bruno*	Rep./Cons.	
44th	Hugh T. Farley*	Rep./Cons.	Chairman of Environmental Conservation
45th	Ronald B. Stafford*	Rep./Cons.	
46th	John M. McHugh*	Rep./Cons.	
47th	James H. Donovan*	Rep./Cons.	Chairman of Education
48th	Nancy Larraine Hoffmann*	Democrat	
49th	Tarky Lombardi Jr.*	Rep./Cons.	
50th	James L. Seward	Rep./Cons.	
51st	Warren M. Anderson*	Rep./Cons.	re-elected Temporary President
52nd	Randy Kuhl*	Rep./Cons.	
53rd	L. Paul Kehoe*	Rep./Cons.	
54th	John D. Perry*	Democrat	
55th	Ralph E. Quattrociocchi*	Dem./Cons.	
56th	Jess J. Present*	Republican	
57th	William Stachowski*	Dem./Cons.	
58th	Anthony M. Masiello*	Dem./Lib.	
59th	Dale M. Volker*	Rep./Cons.	
60th	Walter J. Floss Jr.*	Rep./Cons.	
61st	John B. Daly*	Rep./Cons./RTL	

=== Employees ===
- Secretary: Stephen F. Sloan

== State Assembly ==
=== Assembly members ===
The asterisk (*) denotes members of the previous Legislature who continued in office as members of this Legislature.

Note: For brevity, the chairmanships omit the words "...the Committee on (the)..."

District	Assembly member	Party	Notes
1st	Joseph Sawicki Jr.*	Rep./Cons.	
2nd	John L. Behan*	Rep./Cons.	
3rd	Icilio W. Bianchi Jr.*	Democrat	
4th	Robert J. Gaffney*	Rep./RTL	
5th	Paul E. Harenberg*	Democrat	
6th	Robert C. Wertz*	Rep./Cons./RTL	
7th	Thomas F. Barraga*	Rep./Cons./RTL	
8th	John C. Cochrane*	Rep./Cons.	
9th	John J. Flanagan	Rep./Cons./RTL	
10th	Toni Rettaliata*	Rep./Cons.	on November 3, 1987, elected as Supervisor of Huntington
10th	James D. Conte	Republican	on March 15, 1988, elected to fill vacancy
11th	Patrick G. Halpin*	Democrat	on November 3, 1987, elected as Suffolk County Executive
11th	Robert K. Sweeney	Democrat	on March 15, 1988, elected to fill vacancy
12th	Philip B. Healey*	Rep./Cons.	
13th	Lewis J. Yevoli*	Democrat	
14th	Frederick E. Parola*	Rep./Cons.	
15th	Daniel Frisa*	Rep./Cons.	
16th	Thomas DiNapoli	Dem./Lib.	
17th	Kemp Hannon*	Rep./Cons.	
18th	Barbara Patton*	Dem./Lib.	in January 1988 appointed to the NYS Workers' Compensation Board
18th	Earlene Hill Hooper	Democrat	on March 15, 1988, elected to fill vacancy
19th	Armand P. D'Amato*	Republican	resigned on February 23, 1987.
19th	Charles J. O'Shea	Republican	on April 7, 1987, elected to fill vacancy
20th	Arthur J. Kremer*	Dem./Lib.	resigned on December 14, 1988
21st	Gregory R. Becker*	Rep./Cons.	
22nd	George H. Madison*	Rep./Cons.	
23rd	Gerdi E. Lipschutz*	Dem./Lib.	resigned on March 9, 1987
23rd	Audrey Pheffer	Democrat	on April 28, 1987, elected to fill vacancy
24th	Saul Weprin*	Democrat	Chairman of Ways and Means
25th	Douglas Prescott*	Rep./Cons./RTL	
26th	Morton C. Hillman	Democrat	
27th	Nettie Mayersohn*	Democrat	
28th	Alan G. Hevesi*	Democrat	
29th	Cynthia Jenkins*	Dem./Lib.	
30th	Joseph Crowley	Democrat	
31st	Anthony S. Seminerio*	Dem./Cons.	
32nd	Edward Abramson*	Democrat	
33rd	Barbara M. Clark	Democrat	
34th	Ivan C. Lafayette*	Democrat	
35th	Helen M. Marshall*	Democrat	
36th	Denis J. Butler*	Democrat	
37th	Catherine Nolan*	Democrat	
38th	Frederick D. Schmidt*	Dem./RTL	
39th	Anthony J. Genovesi	Democrat	
40th	Edward Griffith*	Dem./Lib.	
41st	Helene Weinstein*	Democrat	
42nd	Rhoda S. Jacobs*	Dem./Lib.	
43rd	Clarence Norman Jr.*	Democrat	
44th	Mel Miller*	Dem./Lib.	elected Speaker
45th	Daniel L. Feldman*	Democrat	
46th	Howard L. Lasher*	Dem./Lib.	
47th	Frank J. Barbaro*	Dem./Lib.	
48th	Dov Hikind*	Democrat	
49th	Peter J. Abbate Jr.	Democrat	
50th	Joseph R. Lentol*	Democrat	
51st	James F. Brennan*	Dem./Lib.	
52nd	Eileen C. Dugan*	Dem./Lib.	
53rd	Vito J. Lopez*	Dem./Lib.	
54th	Thomas F. Catapano*	Dem./Lib.	
55th	William F. Boyland*	Dem./Lib.	
56th	Albert Vann*	Liberal	
57th	Roger L. Green*	Liberal	
58th	Elizabeth Connelly*	Democrat	
59th	Eric N. Vitaliano*	Dem./Cons.	
60th	Robert A. Straniere*	Rep./Cons./RTL	
61st	William F. Passannante*	Dem./Lib.	
62nd	Sheldon Silver*	Dem./Lib.	Chairman of Codes
63rd	Steven Sanders*	Dem./Lib.	
64th	Richard N. Gottfried*	Dem./Lib.	
65th	Alexander B. Grannis*	Dem./Lib.	
66th	Mark Alan Siegel*	Dem./Lib.	
67th	Jerrold Nadler*	Dem./Lib.	
68th	Angelo Del Toro*	Democrat	
69th	Edward C. Sullivan*	Dem./Lib.	
70th	Geraldine L. Daniels*	Dem./Lib.	
71st	Herman D. Farrell Jr.*	Democrat	
72nd	John Brian Murtaugh*	Dem./Lib.	
73rd	José E. Serrano*	Dem./Lib.	
74th	Hector L. Diaz*	Dem./Lib.	
75th	John C. Dearie*	Dem./Lib.	
76th	Aurelia Greene*	Dem./Lib.	
77th	Jose Rivera*	Dem./Lib.	on November 3, 1987, elected to the New York City Council
77th	Israel Martinez	Democrat	on March 15, 1988, elected to fill vacancy
78th	Gloria Davis*	Democrat	
79th	George Friedman*	Dem./Lib.	
80th	G. Oliver Koppell*	Dem./Lib.	Chairman of Judiciary
81st	Eliot Engel*	Dem./Lib.	on November 8, 1988, elected to the 101st U.S. Congress
82nd	Larry Seabrook*	Dem./Lib.	
83rd	Terence M. Zaleski	Democrat	
84th	Gordon W. Burrows*	Rep./Cons.	on November 8, 1988, elected to the New York Supreme Court
85th	Ronald C. Tocci*	Democrat	
86th	Richard L. Brodsky*	Democrat	
87th	Peter M. Sullivan*	Rep./Cons.	
88th	Gregory P. Young*	Dem./Lib.	
89th	Henry William Barnett*	Rep./Cons.	
90th	Vincent Leibell*	Rep./Cons.	
91st	George E. Pataki*	Rep./Cons.	
92nd	Robert J. Connor*	Dem./Lib.	
93rd	Samuel Colman*	Dem./Lib.	
94th	Mary M. McPhillips*	Democrat	
95th	William J. Larkin Jr.*	Rep./Cons.	
96th	Lawrence E. Bennett*	Democrat	
97th	Stephen M. Saland*	Rep./Cons.	
98th	Richard I. Coombe*	Rep./Cons.	
99th	Glenn E. Warren*	Rep./Cons.	
100th	Neil W. Kelleher*	Rep./Cons./RTL	
101st	Maurice D. Hinchey*	Dem./Lib.	
102nd	John Faso	Republican	
103rd	Arnold W. Proskin*	Rep./Cons.	
104th	Richard J. Conners*	Dem./Lib.	
105th	Paul D. Tonko*	Dem./Lib.	
106th	Michael R. McNulty*	Dem./Lib.	on November 8, 1988, elected to the 101st U.S. Congress
107th	James Tedisco*	Rep./Cons.	
108th	Robert A. D'Andrea*	Rep./Cons.	
109th	Glenn H. Harris*	Rep./Cons.	
110th	Chris Ortloff*	Rep./Cons.	
111th	John W. McCann*	Rep./Cons.	
112th	John G. A. O'Neil*	Rep./Cons.	
113th	Anthony J. Casale*	Rep./Cons.	
114th	H. Robert Nortz*	Rep./Cons.	
115th	William R. Sears*	Rep./Cons./RTL	
116th	Ralph J. Eannace Jr.	Rep./Cons.	
117th	Ray T. Chesbro*	Rep./Cons.	
118th	Michael J. Bragman*	Democrat	
119th	William E. Bush*	Rep./Cons.	
120th	Melvin N. Zimmer*	Democrat	
121st	Hyman M. Miller*	Rep./Cons.	
122nd	Clarence D. Rappleyea Jr.*	Republican	Minority Leader
123rd	Richard H. Miller*	Rep./Cons.	
124th	James R. Tallon Jr.*	Democrat	Majority Leader from April 28, 1987
125th	Hugh S. MacNeil*	Republican	
126th	George H. Winner Jr.*	Rep./Cons.	
127th	Donald R. Davidsen	Republican	
128th	Michael F. Nozzolio*	Rep./Cons.	
129th	Frank G. Talomie Sr.*	Rep./Cons.	
130th	Robert L. King	Rep./Cons.	
131st	Gary Proud*	Dem./Rep.	
132nd	Pinny Cooke*	Rep./Cons.	
133rd	David F. Gantt*	Democrat	
134th	Roger J. Robach*	Dem./Cons.	
135th	James F. Nagle*	Rep./Cons.	
136th	John W. Hasper	Republican	
137th	R. Stephen Hawley*	Rep./Cons.	
138th	Joseph T. Pillittere*	Dem./Lib.	
139th	Matthew J. Murphy Jr.*	Dem./Cons./RTL	
140th	Robin L. Schimminger*	Democrat	
141st	Arthur O. Eve*	Dem./Lib.	
142nd	John B. Sheffer II*	Rep./Cons.	
143rd	Dennis T. Gorski*	Dem./Cons.	on November 3, 1987, elected as Erie County Executive
143rd	Paul Tokasz	Democrat	on March 15, 1988, elected to fill vacancy
144th	William B. Hoyt*	Dem./Lib.	
145th	Richard J. Keane*	Dem./Cons.	
146th	Francis J. Pordum*	Dem./Cons.	
147th	L. William Paxon*	Rep./Cons./RTL	on November 8, 1988, elected to the 101st U.S. Congress
148th	Vincent J. Graber Sr.*	Dem./Cons.	
149th	Daniel B. Walsh*	Democrat	Majority Leader; resigned his seat effective April 26, 1987
149th	Patricia McGee	Republican	on June 16, 1987, elected to fill vacancy
150th	William L. Parment*	Dem./Lib.	

=== Employees ===
- Clerk: Francine Misasi

== Sources ==
- Balloting for State Senate: New York's 61 Districts in The New York Times on November 6, 1986
- Vote Totals for Races in the New York State Assembly in The New York Times on November 6, 1986
- Democrats Take Assembly Seats In 4 of 5 Races by Frank Lynn, in The New York Times on March 16, 1988
