= 191st New York State Legislature =

New York state legislative session

←	190th	192nd	→
- New York State Capitol (2009)

Overview
- Legislative body: New York State Legislature
- Jurisdiction: New York, United States
- Term: January 1, 1995 – December 31, 1996

Senate
- Members: 61
- President: Lt. Gov. Betsy McCaughey Ross (R)
- Temporary President: Joseph Bruno (R)
- Party control: Republican; 1995: (36–25); 1996: (37–24)

Assembly
- Members: 150
- Speaker: Sheldon Silver (D)
- Party control: Democratic; 1995: (94–56); 1996: (95–55)

Sessions
- 1st: January 4 – June 30, 1995
- 2nd: January 3 – July 13, 1996
- 3rd: December 17 – 18, 1996

The 191st New York State Legislature, consisting of the New York State Senate and the New York State Assembly, met from January 4, 1995, to December 31, 1996, during the first and second years of George Pataki's governorship, in Albany.

== Background ==
Under the provisions of the New York Constitution of 1938 and the U.S. Supreme Court decision to follow the One man, one vote rule, re-apportioned in 1992 by the Legislature, 61 Senators and 150 assemblymen were elected in single-seat districts for two-year terms. Senate and Assembly districts consisted of approximately the same number of inhabitants, the area being apportioned contiguously without restrictions regarding county boundaries.

At this time there were two major political parties: the Republican Party and the Democratic Party. The Conservative Party, the Independence Party, the Liberal Party, the Right to Life Party, the Tax Cut Now Party, the Libertarian Party and the Socialist Workers Party also nominated tickets.

== Elections ==
The 1994 New York state election was held on November 8. State Senator George Pataki was elected Governor, and Betsy McCaughey Ross was elected Lieutenant Governor, both Republicans with Conservative and Tax Cut Now endorsement, who defeated the incumbent Democrats Mario Cuomo and Stan Lundine. The elections to the other three statewide elective offices resulted in the re-election of State Comptroller Carl McCall and U.S. Senator Daniel Patrick Moynihan, both Democrats; and the election of Dennis Vacco as Attorney General, a Republican with Conservative endorsement who defeated the incumbent Democrat G. Oliver Koppell. The approximate party strength at this election, as expressed by the vote for Governor, was: Democrats 2,273,000; Republicans 2,156,000; Conservatives 329,000; Independence 217,000; Liberals 92,000; Right to Life 68,000; Tax Cut Now 54,000; Libertarians 9,500; and Socialist Workers 5,500.

36 of the sitting 39 women members of the legislature—State Senators Nancy Larraine Hoffmann (Dem.), of Syracuse; Mary Ellen Jones (Democrat), of Irondequoit; Olga A. Méndez (Democrat), of East Harlem; Velmanette Montgomery (Democrat), of Brooklyn; Suzi Oppenheimer (Dem.), of Mamaroneck; Mary Lou Rath (Republican), of Williamsville; Nellie R. Santiago (Democrat), of Brooklyn; and Ada L. Smith (Dem.), of Queens; and Assemblywomen Patricia Acampora (Republican), of Mattituck; Carmen E. Arroyo (Democrat), of the Bronx; Nancy Calhoun (Republican), of Blooming Grove; Joan Christensen (Democrat), of Syracuse; Barbara M. Clark (Democrat), of Queens; Elizabeth Connelly (Dem.), of Staten Island; Vivian E. Cook (Dem.) of Queens; RoAnn Destito (Democrat), of Rome; Gloria Davis (Dem.), of the Bronx; Eileen C. Dugan (Democrat), of Brooklyn; Donna Ferrara (Rep.), a lawyer of Westbury; Sandy Galef (Democrat), of Ossining; Deborah J. Glick (Dem.), of Manhattan; Aurelia Greene (Dem.), of the Bronx; Audrey Hochberg (Dem.), of Scarsdale; Elizabeth C. Hoffman (Republican), of North Tonawanda; Earlene Hill Hooper (Dem.), of Hempstead; Rhoda S. Jacobs (Democrat), of Brooklyn; Susan V. John (Dem.), of Rochester; Melinda Katz (Dem.), a lawyer of Queens; Naomi C. Matusow (Democrat), a lawyer of Armonk; Nettie Mayersohn (Democrat), of Queens; Patricia McGee (Republican), of Franklinville; Catherine Nolan (Dem.), of Queens; Chloe Ann O'Neil (Republican), an elementary school teacher of Parishville; Audrey Pheffer (Democrat), of Queens; Frances T. Sullivan (Republican), of Fulton; and Helene Weinstein (Democrat), a lawyer of Brooklyn—were re-elected. Catherine M. Abate (Democrat), of Manhattan, was also elected to the State Senate. Debra J. Mazzarelli (Republican), of Patchogue; and Sandra Lee Wirth (Republican), of West Seneca, were also elected to the Assembly.

The 1995 New York state election was held on November 7. Four vacancies in the Assembly were filled. Betty Little (Republican), of Queensbury, was elected to fill one of the vacancies.

== Sessions ==
The Legislature met for the first regular session (the 218th) at the State Capitol in Albany on January 4, 1995; and recessed indefinitely in the morning of June 30.

Sheldon Silver (Dem.) was re-elected Speaker of the Assembly.

Joseph Bruno (Rep.) was elected Temporary President of the Senate.

The Legislature met for the second regular session (the 219th) at the State Capitol in Albany on January 3, 1996; and recessed indefinitely on July 13.

The Legislature met for a special session from December 17 to 18, 1996, to consider legislation concerning the administration of the public school system in New York City.

== State Senate ==
=== Senators ===
The asterisk (*) denotes members of the previous Legislature who continued in office as members of this Legislature. Vincent Leibell changed from the Assembly to the Senate at the beginning of this legislature. Assemblymen Larry Seabrook and James S. Alesi were elected to fill vacancies in the Senate.

Note: For brevity, the chairmanships omit the words "...the Committee on (the)..."

District	Senator	Party	Notes
1st	Kenneth LaValle*	Republican	
2nd	James J. Lack*	Republican	
3rd	Caesar Trunzo*	Republican	
4th	Owen H. Johnson*	Republican	
5th	Ralph J. Marino*	Republican	resigned on February 8, 1995
5th	Carl L. Marcellino	Republican	on March 14, 1995, elected to fill vacancy
6th	Kemp Hannon*	Republican	
7th	Michael J. Tully Jr.*	Republican	
8th	Norman J. Levy*	Republican	Chairman of Transportation
9th	Dean Skelos*	Republican	
10th	Alton R. Waldon Jr.*	Democrat	
11th	Frank Padavan*	Republican	
12th	Ada L. Smith*	Democrat	
13th	Emanuel R. Gold*	Democrat	
14th	George Onorato*	Democrat	
15th	Serphin R. Maltese*	Cons./Rep.	
16th	Leonard P. Stavisky*	Democrat	
17th	Nellie R. Santiago*	Democrat	
18th	Velmanette Montgomery*	Democrat	
19th	Howard E. Babbush*	Democrat	
20th	Marty Markowitz*	Democrat	
21st	Carl Kruger*	Democrat	
22nd	Martin M. Solomon*	Democrat	on November 7, 1995, elected to the New York City Civil Court
22nd	Seymour P. Lachman	Democrat	on February 15, 1996, elected to fill vacancy
23rd	Robert DiCarlo*	Republican	
24th	John J. Marchi*	Republican	
25th	Martin Connor*	Democrat	Minority Leader
26th	Roy M. Goodman*	Republican	
27th	Catherine M. Abate	Democrat	
28th	Olga A. Méndez*	Democrat	
29th	David Paterson*	Democrat	
30th	Franz S. Leichter*	Democrat	
31st	Efrain Gonzalez Jr.*	Democrat	
32nd	Pedro Espada Jr.	Democrat	
33rd	Joseph L. Galiber*	Democrat	died on November 21, 1995
33rd	Larry Seabrook*	Democrat	on February 15, 1996, elected to fill vacancy
34th	Guy J. Velella*	Republican	
35th	Nicholas A. Spano*	Republican	
36th	Suzi Oppenheimer*	Democrat	
37th	Vincent Leibell*	Republican	
38th	Joseph R. Holland*	Republican	
39th	William J. Larkin Jr.*	Republican	
40th	Charles D. Cook*	Republican	
41st	Stephen M. Saland*	Republican	
42nd	Michael J. Hoblock Jr.	Republican	
43rd	Joseph Bruno*	Republican	elected Temporary President
44th	Hugh T. Farley*	Republican	Chairman of Banks
45th	Ronald B. Stafford*	Republican	Chairman of Finance
46th	James W. Wright*	Republican	
47th	William R. Sears*	Republican	
48th	Nancy Larraine Hoffmann*	Democrat	
49th	John A. DeFrancisco*	Republican	
50th	James L. Seward*	Republican	
51st	Thomas W. Libous*	Republican	
52nd	Randy Kuhl*	Republican	
53rd	Michael F. Nozzolio*	Republican	
54th	Richard A. Dollinger*	Democrat	
55th	Mary Ellen Jones*	Democrat	appointed to the New York State Parole Board
55th	James S. Alesi*	Republican	on February 15, 1996, elected to fill vacancy
56th	Jess J. Present*	Republican	
57th	Anthony Nanula*	Democrat	
58th	William Stachowski*	Democrat	
59th	Dale M. Volker*	Republican	
60th	Mary Lou Rath*	Republican	
61st	John B. Daly*	Republican	on January 9, 1995, appointed as NYS Commissioner of Transportation
61st	George D. Maziarz	Republican	on March 14, 1995, elected to fill vacancy

=== Employees ===
- Secretary: Stephen F. Sloan

== State Assembly ==
=== Assembly members ===
The asterisk (*) denotes members of the previous Legislature who continued in office as members of this Legislature.

Note: For brevity, the chairmanships omit the words "...the Committee on (the)..."

District	Assembly member	Party	Notes
1st	Patricia Acampora*	Republican	
2nd	John L. Behan*	Republican	appointed as NYS Commissioner of Veterans' Affairs
2nd	Fred W. Thiele Jr.	Republican	on March 14, 1995, elected to fill vacancy
3rd	Debra J. Mazzarelli	Republican	
4th	Steve Englebright*	Democrat	
5th	Paul E. Harenberg*	Democrat	
6th	Robert C. Wertz*	Republican	
7th	Thomas F. Barraga*	Republican	
8th	Phil Boyle*	Republican	
9th	John J. Flanagan*	Republican	
10th	James D. Conte*	Republican	
11th	Robert K. Sweeney*	Democrat	
12th	Philip B. Healey*	Republican	died on May 27, 1996
13th	David Sidikman*	Democrat	
14th	Marc Herbst*	Republican	
15th	Donna Ferrara*	Republican	
16th	Thomas DiNapoli*	Democrat	
17th	Michael Balboni*	Republican	
18th	Earlene Hill Hooper*	Democrat	
19th	Charles J. O'Shea*	Republican	
20th	Harvey Weisenberg*	Democrat	
21st	Gregory R. Becker*	Republican	
22nd	Vincent T. Muscarella*	Republican	on November 5, 1995, elected to the Nassau County Legislature
22nd	Thomas Alfano	Republican	on February 15, 1996, elected to fill vacancy
23rd	Audrey Pheffer*	Democrat	
24th	Mark Weprin*	Democrat	
25th	Brian M. McLaughlin*	Democrat	
26th	Douglas Prescott*	Republican	
27th	Nettie Mayersohn*	Democrat	
28th	Melinda Katz*	Democrat	
29th	William Scarborough	Democrat	
30th	Joseph Crowley*	Democrat	
31st	Gregory W. Meeks*	Democrat	
32nd	Vivian E. Cook*	Democrat	
33rd	Barbara M. Clark*	Democrat	
34th	Ivan C. Lafayette*	Democrat	
35th	Jeffrion L. Aubry*	Democrat	
36th	Denis J. Butler*	Democrat	
37th	Catherine Nolan*	Democrat	
38th	Anthony S. Seminerio*	Democrat	
39th	Anthony J. Genovesi*	Democrat	
40th	Edward Griffith*	Democrat	
41st	Helene Weinstein*	Democrat	
42nd	Rhoda S. Jacobs*	Democrat	
43rd	Clarence Norman Jr.*	Democrat	
44th	James F. Brennan*	Democrat	
45th	Daniel L. Feldman*	Democrat	
46th	Jules Polonetsky*	Democrat	
47th	Frank J. Barbaro*	Democrat	
48th	Dov Hikind*	Democrat	
49th	Peter J. Abbate Jr.*	Democrat	
50th	Joseph R. Lentol*	Democrat	
51st	Félix W. Ortiz	Democrat	
52nd	Eileen C. Dugan*	Democrat	died on November 8, 1996
53rd	Vito J. Lopez*	Democrat	
54th	Darryl C. Towns*	Democrat	
55th	William F. Boyland*	Democrat	
56th	Albert Vann*	Democrat	
57th	Roger L. Green*	Democrat	
58th	N. Nick Perry	Democrat	
59th	Elizabeth Connelly*	Democrat	
60th	Eric N. Vitaliano*	Democrat	
61st	Robert A. Straniere*	Republican	
62nd	Sheldon Silver*	Democrat	re-elected Speaker
63rd	Steven Sanders*	Democrat	
64th	Richard N. Gottfried*	Democrat	
65th	Alexander B. Grannis*	Democrat	
66th	Deborah J. Glick*	Democrat	
67th	Scott Stringer*	Democrat	
68th	vacant		Assemblyman-elect Angelo Del Toro died on December 30, 1994
68th	Francisco Diaz Jr.	Liberal	on March 14, 1995, elected to fill vacancy
69th	Edward C. Sullivan*	Democrat	
70th	Keith L. T. Wright*	Democrat	
71st	Herman D. Farrell Jr.*	Democrat	Chairman of Ways and Means
72nd	John Brian Murtaugh*	Democrat	
73rd	John Ravitz*	Republican	
74th	Carmen E. Arroyo*	Democrat	
75th	Hector L. Diaz*	Democrat	resigned in December 1995 to become County Clerk of Bronx County
75th	Pedro Gautier Espada	Democrat	on February 15, 1996, elected to fill vacancy
76th	Peter M. Rivera*	Democrat	
77th	Aurelia Greene*	Democrat	
78th	Roberto Ramirez*	Democrat	
79th	Gloria Davis*	Democrat	
80th	Jeffrey D. Klein	Democrat	
81st	Jeffrey Dinowitz*	Democrat	
82nd	Stephen B. Kaufman*	Democrat	
83rd	Larry Seabrook*	Democrat	on February 15, 1996, elected to the State Senate
83rd	Samuel Bea Jr.	Democrat	on April 25, 1996, elected to fill vacancy
84th	J. Gary Pretlow*	Democrat	
85th	Ronald C. Tocci*	Democrat	
86th	Richard L. Brodsky*	Democrat	
87th	Mike Spano	Republican	
88th	Audrey Hochberg*	Democrat	
89th	Naomi C. Matusow*	Democrat	
90th	Sandy Galef*	Democrat	
91st	Willis Stephens	Republican	
92nd	Alexander J. Gromack*	Democrat	
93rd	Samuel Colman*	Democrat	
94th	Nancy Calhoun*	Republican	
95th	John Bonacic*	Republican	
96th	Thomas J. Kirwan	Republican	
97th	Joel M. Miller	Republican	
98th	Jacob E. Gunther III*	Democrat	
99th	Patrick R. Manning	Republican	
100th	Robert A. D'Andrea*	Republican	
101st	John J. Guerin	Republican	
102nd	John Faso*	Republican	
103rd	James Tedisco*	Republican	
104th	John McEneny*	Democrat	
105th	Paul D. Tonko*	Democrat	
106th	Ronald Canestrari*	Democrat	
107th	Robert G. Prentiss	Republican	
108th	Pat M. Casale*	Republican	
109th	James P. King*	Republican	appointed to the New York Court of Claims
109th	Betty Little	Republican	on November 7, 1995, elected to fill vacancy
110th	Chris Ortloff*	Republican	
111th	Bill Magee*	Democrat	
112th	Chloe Ann O'Neil*	Republican	
113th	Anthony J. Casale*	Republican	appointed as Chairman of the New York State Liquor Authority
113th	Marc W. Butler	Republican	on November 7, 1995, elected to fill vacancy
114th	H. Robert Nortz*	Republican	
115th	David R. Townsend Jr.*	Republican	
116th	RoAnn Destito*	Democrat	
117th	Frances T. Sullivan*	Republican	
118th	Michael J. Bragman*	Democrat	Majority Leader
119th	Joan Christensen*	Democrat	
120th	Bernard J. Mahoney	Republican	
121st	Harold C. Brown Jr.*	Republican	
122nd	Clarence D. Rappleyea Jr.*	Republican	Minority Leader; on June 29, 1995, appointed to the New York Power Authority
122nd	Clifford W. Crouch	Republican	on November 7, 1995, elected to fill vacancy
123rd	Jay J. Dinga	Republican	
124th	Robert J. Warner*	Republican	
125th	Martin A. Luster*	Democrat	
126th	Daniel J. Fessenden*	Republican	
127th	George H. Winner Jr.*	Republican	
128th	Bob Oaks*	Republican	
129th	Craig J. Doran*	Republican	
130th	Donald R. Davidsen*	Republican	in October 1995 appointed as NYS Commissioner of Agriculture
130th	James Bacalles	Republican	on November 7, 1995, elected to fill vacancy
131st	Susan V. John*	Democrat	
132nd	Joseph D. Morelle*	Democrat	
133rd	David F. Gantt*	Democrat	
134th	Joseph Robach*	Democrat	
135th	James S. Alesi*	Republican	resigned to run for the State Senate
135th	David Koon	Democrat	on February 15, 1996, elected to fill vacancy
136th	Jerry Johnson*	Republican	
137th	Charles H. Nesbitt*	Republican	
138th	Joseph T. Pillittere*	Democrat	
139th	Elizabeth C. Hoffman*	Republican	resigned in February 1995 to run for the State Senate
139th	David E. Seaman	Republican	on March 14, 1995, elected to fill vacancy
140th	Robin L. Schimminger*	Democrat	
141st	Arthur O. Eve*	Democrat	
142nd	Richard R. Anderson*	Republican	
143rd	Paul Tokasz*	Democrat	
144th	Sam Hoyt*	Democrat	
145th	Richard J. Keane*	Democrat	
146th	Francis J. Pordum*	Democrat	
147th	Thomas M. Reynolds*	Republican	Minority Leader from June 30, 1995
148th	Sandra Lee Wirth	Republican	
149th	Patricia McGee*	Republican	
150th	William L. Parment*	Democrat	

=== Employees ===
- Clerk: Francine Misasi

== Sources ==
- Senate and Assembly members (Vote on the Budget Bill, on March 9, 1995)
