= 184th New York State Legislature =

New York state legislative session

←	183rd	185th	→
- New York State Capitol (2009)

Overview
- Legislative body: New York State Legislature
- Jurisdiction: New York, United States
- Term: January 1, 1981 – December 31, 1982

Senate
- Members: 60
- President: Lt. Gov. Mario Cuomo (D)
- Temporary President: Warren M. Anderson (R)
- Party control: Republican (35–25)

Assembly
- Members: 150
- Speaker: Stanley Fink (D)
- Party control: Democratic; 1981: (86–64); 1982: (88–62)

Sessions
- 1st: January 7 – July 10, 1981
- 2nd: September 16, 1981 –
- 3rd: October 26 – 30, 1981
- 4th: December 3, 1981 –
- 5th: January 6 – July 3, 1982
- 6th: December 13 – 22, 1982

The 184th New York State Legislature, consisting of the New York State Senate and the New York State Assembly, met from January 7, 1981, to December 31, 1982, during the seventh and eighth years of Hugh Carey's governorship, in Albany.

== Background ==
Under the provisions of the New York Constitution of 1938 and the U.S. Supreme Court decision to follow the One man, one vote rule, re-apportioned in 1971, and amended in 1974, by the legislature, 60 senators and 150 assemblymen were elected in single-seat districts for two-year terms. Senate and Assembly districts consisted of approximately the same number of inhabitants, the area being apportioned contiguously without restrictions regarding county boundaries.

At this time there were two major political parties: the Republican Party and the Democratic Party. The Liberal Party, the Conservative Party, the Right to Life Party, the Libertarian Party, the Communist Party, the Workers World Party and the Socialist Workers Party also nominated tickets.

== Elections ==
The 1980 New York state election was held on November 4. The only statewide elective office up for election was a U.S. Senator from New York. Republican Al D'Amato was elected with Conservative and Right to Life endorsement. The approximate party strength at this election, as expressed by the vote for U.S. Senator, was: Republicans 2,272,000; Democrats 2,619,000; Liberals 665,000; Conservatives 275,000; Right to Life 152,000; Libertarians 21,500; Communists 4,000; Workers World 3,500; and Socialist Workers 3,000.

Twelve of the thirteen women members of the previous legislature—State Senators Carol Berman (Dem.), of Lawrence; Mary B. Goodhue (Rep.), a lawyer of Mount Kisco; Olga A. Méndez (Dem.), of East Harlem, and Linda Winikow (Dem.), of Spring Valley; and Assemblywomen Elizabeth Connelly (Dem.), of Staten Island; Pinny Cooke (Rep.), of Rochester; Joan B. Hague (Rep.), of Glens Falls; Rhoda S. Jacobs (Dem.), of Brooklyn; and Gerdi E. Lipschutz (Dem.), of Queens; May W. Newburger (Dem.), of Great Neck; Toni Rettaliata (Rep.), of Huntington; and Florence M. Sullivan (Rep.), a lawyer of Brooklyn—were re-elected. Geraldine L. Daniels (Dem.), of the Bronx; Gloria Davis (Dem.), of the Bronx; Eileen C. Dugan (Dem.), of Brooklyn; Gail S. Shaffer (Dem.), of North Blenheim; Carol A. Siwek (Rep.), of Buffalo; and Helene Weinstein (Dem.), a lawyer of Brooklyn; were also elected to the Assembly.

The 1981 New York state election was held on November 3. No statewide elective offices were up for election. One vacancy each in the State Senate and the Assembly were filled.

On April 20, 1982, Aurelia Greene (Dem.), of the Bronx, was elected to fill a vacancy in the Assembly. Thus the 184th Legislature finished having 19 women members, surpassing the previous record of 13 in the 183rd New York State Legislature (1979–1980).

== Sessions ==
The legislature met for the first regular session (the 204th) at the State Capitol in Albany on January 7, 1981; and recessed indefinitely on July 10.

Stanley Fink (Dem.) was re-elected Speaker.

Warren M. Anderson (Rep.) was re-elected temporary president of the state Senate.

The legislature met again on September 16, 1981, to enact amendments to the election laws, concerning the primary elections in New York City.

The legislature met again from October 26 to 30, 1981, to consider welfare and tax matters.

The legislature met again on December 3, 1981, to override Governor Carey's veto of a new property tax bill.

The legislature met for the second regular session (the 205th) at the State Capitol in Albany on January 6, 1982; and recessed indefinitely on July 3.

On March 26, 1982, a special panel of federal judges, consisting of Lawrence W. Pierce, Robert J. Ward and Vincent L. Broderick, ordered the legislature to re-apportion the legislative districts by April 16.

On April 19, the federal judges noted that the legislature had not agreed upon a re-apportionment, and announced that they would appoint somebody to elaborate a proposal.

On May 8, Senate Republicans and Assembly Democrats announced that they had agreed upon a new apportionment. The number of seats in the State Senate was increased from 60 to 61. The new district lines were gerrymandered by the Republican Senate majority to increase Republican strength, and by the Democratic Assembly majority to increase Democratic strength.

On June 23, the feral judges ordered Special Master Robert P. Patterson Jr. to revise the new apportionment proposed by the legislature.

On July 3, the revised re-apportionment was approved by the U.S. Department of Justice.

The legislature met for a special session from December 13 to 22, 1982, to consider again measures to balance the budget and to keep the mass transit fare in New York City down.

== State Senate ==
=== Senators ===
The asterisk (*) denotes members of the previous Legislature who continued in office as members of this Legislature. L. Paul Kehoe changed from the Assembly to the Senate.

Note: For brevity, the chairmanships omit the words "...the Committee on (the)..."

District	Senator	Party	Notes
1st	Kenneth LaValle*	Republican	
2nd	James J. Lack*	Republican	
3rd	Caesar Trunzo*	Republican	
4th	Owen H. Johnson*	Republican	
5th	Ralph J. Marino*	Republican	
6th	John R. Dunne*	Republican	
7th	John D. Caemmerer*	Republican	died on February 7, 1982
7th	Michael J. Tully Jr.	Republican	on April 20, 1982, elected to fill vacancy
8th	Norman J. Levy*	Republican	
9th	Carol Berman*	Democrat	
10th	Jeremy S. Weinstein*	Democrat	
11th	Frank Padavan*	Republican	
12th	Gary L. Ackerman*	Democrat	
13th	Emanuel R. Gold*	Democrat	
14th	Anthony V. Gazzara*	Democrat	
15th	Martin J. Knorr*	Republican	
16th	Howard E. Babbush*	Democrat	
17th	Major Owens*	Democrat	on November 2, 1982, elected to the 98th U.S. Congress
18th	Thomas J. Bartosiewicz*	Democrat	
19th	Marty Markowitz*	Democrat	
20th	Donald Halperin*	Democrat	
21st	Christopher J. Mega*	Republican	
22nd	Martin M. Solomon*	Democrat	
23rd	Vander L. Beatty*	Democrat	
24th	John J. Marchi*	Republican	Chairman of Finance
25th	Martin Connor*	Democrat	
26th	Roy M. Goodman*	Republican	
27th	Manfred Ohrenstein*	Democrat	Minority Leader
28th	Leon Bogues*	Democrat	
29th	Franz S. Leichter*	Democrat	
30th	Olga A. Méndez*	Democrat	
31st	Israel Ruiz Jr.*	Democrat	
32nd	Joseph L. Galiber*	Democrat	
33rd	Abraham Bernstein*	Democrat	
34th	John D. Calandra*	Republican	
35th	John E. Flynn*	Republican	
36th	Joseph R. Pisani*	Republican	
37th	Mary B. Goodhue*	Republican	
38th	Linda Winikow*	Democrat	
39th	Jay P. Rolison Jr.*	Republican	
40th	Richard E. Schermerhorn*	Republican	
41st	Joseph Bruno*	Republican	
42nd	Howard C. Nolan Jr.*	Democrat	
43rd	Ronald B. Stafford*	Republican	
44th	Hugh T. Farley*	Republican	
45th	Hugh Douglas Barclay*	Republican	
46th	James H. Donovan*	Republican	Chairman of Education
47th	Warren M. Anderson*	Republican	re-elected Temporary President
48th	Charles D. Cook*	Republican	
49th	Martin S. Auer*	Republican	
50th	Tarky Lombardi Jr.*	Republican	
51st	William T. Smith*	Republican	
52nd	L. Paul Kehoe*	Republican	
53rd	John D. Perry*	Democrat	
54th	Fred J. Eckert*	Republican	on February 11, 1982, appointed as U.S. Ambassador to Fiji
54th	William M. Steinfeldt	Republican	on April 20, 1982, elected to fill vacancy
55th	Anthony M. Masiello	Democrat	
56th	Raymond F. Gallagher*	Democrat	resigned in July 1981, to become Chairman of the Niagara Frontier Transportation Authority
56th	William Stachowski	Democrat	on November 3, 1981, elected to fill vacancy
57th	Jess J. Present*	Republican	
58th	Dale M. Volker*	Republican	
59th	Walter J. Floss Jr.*	Republican	
60th	John B. Daly*	Republican	

=== Employees ===
- Secretary: Roger C. Thompson (1981)
  - Stephen F. Sloan (1982)

== State Assembly ==
=== Assemblymen ===
The asterisk (*) denotes members of the previous Legislature who continued in office as members of this Legislature.

Note: For brevity, the chairmanships omit the words "...the Committee on (the)..."

District	Assemblymen	Party	Notes
1st	John L. Behan*	Republican	
2nd	George J. Hochbrueckner*	Democrat	
3rd	Icilio W. Bianchi Jr.*	Democrat	
4th	Robert C. Wertz*	Republican	
5th	Paul E. Harenberg*	Democrat	
6th	John C. Cochrane*	Republican	
7th	John J. Flanagan*	Republican	
8th	Toni Rettaliata*	Republican	
9th	Louis T. Howard*	Republican	on November 3, 1981, elected to the Suffolk County Legislature
9th	Patrick G. Halpin	Democrat	on April 20, 1982, elected to fill vacancy
10th	Lewis J. Yevoli*	Democrat	
11th	Philip B. Healey*	Republican	
12th	Frederick E. Parola*	Republican	
13th	Thomas S. Gulotta*	Republican	on January 9, 1981, appointed as Presiding Supervisor of the Town of Hempstead
13th	Guy Mazza	Republican	on April 7, 1981, elected to fill vacancy
14th	Joseph M. Reilly*	Republican	
15th	Angelo F. Orazio*	Democrat	
16th	May W. Newburger*	Democrat	
17th	Kemp Hannon*	Republican	
18th	Armand P. D'Amato*	Republican	
19th	Dean Skelos	Republican	
20th	Arthur J. Kremer*	Democrat	Chairman of Ways and Means
21st	George H. Madison*	Republican	
22nd	Gerdi E. Lipschutz*	Democrat	
23rd	John A. Esposito*	Republican	
24th	Saul Weprin*	Democrat	
25th	Douglas Prescott	Republican	
26th	Leonard P. Stavisky*	Democrat	
27th	David L. Cohen*	Democrat	
28th	Alan G. Hevesi*	Democrat	
29th	Andrew Jenkins*	Democrat	
30th	Ralph Goldstein*	Democrat	
31st	Anthony S. Seminerio*	Democrat	
32nd	Edward Abramson*	Democrat	
33rd	John T. Flack*	Republican	
34th	Ivan C. Lafayette*	Democrat	
35th	John G. Lopresto*	Republican	
36th	Denis J. Butler*	Democrat	
37th	Clifford E. Wilson*	Democrat	
38th	Frederick D. Schmidt*	Democrat	
39th	Stanley Fink*	Democrat	re-elected Speaker
40th	Edward Griffith*	Democrat	
41st	Helene Weinstein	Democrat	
42nd	Harry Smoler*	Democrat	
43rd	Rhoda S. Jacobs*	Democrat	
44th	Mel Miller*	Democrat	
45th	Daniel L. Feldman	Democrat	
46th	Howard L. Lasher*	Democrat	
47th	Frank J. Barbaro*	Democrat	
48th	Samuel Hirsch*	Democrat	
49th	Dominick L. DiCarlo*	Republican	in July 1981 nominated as an Assistant U.S. Secretary of State
49th	Louis Freda	Democrat	on November 3, 1981, elected to fill vacancy
50th	Florence M. Sullivan*	Republican	
51st	Joseph Ferris*	Democrat	
52nd	Eileen C. Dugan	Democrat	
53rd	Woodrow Lewis*	Democrat	
54th	Thomas S. Boyland*	Democrat	died on February 7, 1982
54th	William F. Boyland	Democrat	on April 20, 1982, elected to fill vacancy
55th	Thomas R. Fortune*	Democrat	
56th	Albert Vann*	Democrat	
57th	Roger L. Green	Democrat	
58th	Joseph R. Lentol*	Democrat	
59th	Victor L. Robles*	Democrat	
60th	Robert A. Straniere	Republican	
61st	Elizabeth Connelly*	Democrat	
62nd	Paul M. Viggiano*	Democrat	
63rd	Sheldon Silver*	Democrat	
64th	William F. Passannante*	Democrat	Speaker pro tempore
65th	Steven Sanders*	Democrat	
66th	Mark Alan Siegel*	Democrat	
67th	Richard N. Gottfried*	Democrat	
68th	Alexander B. Grannis*	Democrat	
69th	Jerrold Nadler*	Democrat	
70th	Edward C. Sullivan*	Democrat	
71st	Geraldine L. Daniels	Democrat	
72nd	Angelo Del Toro*	Democrat	
73rd	John Brian Murtaugh	Democrat	
74th	Herman D. Farrell Jr.*	Democrat	
75th	José E. Serrano*	Democrat	
76th	Charles R. Johnson*	Democrat	resigned on December 16, 1981
76th	Aurelia Greene	Democrat	on April 20, 1982, elected to fill vacancy
77th	Armando Montano*	Democrat	
78th	Gloria Davis	Democrat	
79th	Louis Niñé*	Democrat	
80th	Guy J. Velella*	Republican	
81st	Eliot Engel*	Democrat	
82nd	Sean P. Walsh*	Democrat	
83rd	George Friedman*	Democrat	
84th	G. Oliver Koppell*	Democrat	
85th	John C. Dearie*	Democrat	
86th	Vincent A. Marchiselli*	Democrat	
87th	Nicholas A. Spano*	Republican	
88th	John R. Branca	Democrat	
89th	William B. Finneran*	Democrat	
90th	Gordon W. Burrows*	Republican	
91st	John M. Perone*	Republican	
92nd	Peter M. Sullivan*	Republican	
93rd	Jon S. Fossel*	Republican	
94th	Willis H. Stephens*	Republican	
95th	Eugene Levy*	Republican	
96th	Thomas P. Morahan	Republican	
97th	William J. Larkin Jr.*	Republican	
98th	Raymond M. Kisor*	Republican	
99th	Stephen M. Saland*	Republican	
100th	Glenn E. Warren*	Republican	
101st	Maurice D. Hinchey*	Democrat	
102nd	Clarence D. Lane*	Republican	
103rd	Michael J. Hoblock Jr.*	Republican	
104th	Richard J. Conners*	Democrat	
105th	Gail S. Shaffer	Democrat	
106th	Neil W. Kelleher*	Republican	
107th	Clark C. Wemple*	Republican	
108th	Robert A. D'Andrea*	Republican	
109th	Glenn H. Harris*	Republican	
110th	Joan B. Hague*	Republican	
111th	Andrew W. Ryan Jr.*	Republican	
112th	John G. A. O'Neil	Republican	
113th	Anthony J. Casale*	Republican	
114th	H. Robert Nortz*	Republican	
115th	William R. Sears*	Republican	
116th	Richard S. Ruggiero	Democrat	
117th	Ray T. Chesbro	Republican	
118th	Michael J. Bragman	Democrat	
119th	Hyman M. Miller*	Republican	
120th	Melvin N. Zimmer*	Democrat	
121st	William E. Bush*	Republican	
122nd	Clarence D. Rappleyea Jr.*	Republican	
123rd	James W. McCabe*	Democrat	
124th	James R. Tallon Jr.*	Democrat	
125th	Lloyd Stephen Riford Jr.*	Republican	
126th	George H. Winner Jr.	Republican	
127th	Randy Kuhl	Republican	
128th	Hugh S. MacNeil*	Republican	
129th	Frank G. Talomie Sr.	Republican	
130th	Thomas A. Hanna*	Republican	
131st	Gary Proud*	Democrat	
132nd	Pinny Cooke*	Republican	
133rd	Dale Rath	Republican	
134th	Roger J. Robach*	Democrat	
135th	James F. Nagle*	Republican	
136th	James L. Emery*	Republican	Minority Leader
137th	R. Stephen Hawley*	Republican	
138th	Joseph T. Pillittere*	Democrat	
139th	Matthew J. Murphy Jr.*	Democrat	
140th	Robin L. Schimminger*	Democrat	
141st	John B. Sheffer II*	Republican	
142nd	Carol A. Siwek	Republican	
143rd	Arthur O. Eve*	Democrat	
144th	William B. Hoyt*	Democrat	
145th	Richard J. Keane*	Democrat	
146th	Dennis T. Gorski*	Democrat	
147th	Richard L. Kennedy*	Republican	
148th	Vincent J. Graber, Sr.*	Democrat	
149th	Daniel B. Walsh*	Democrat	Majority Leader
150th	Rolland E. Kidder*	Democrat	

=== Employees ===
- Clerk: Catherine A. Carey

== Sources ==
- List of state legislators in The Public Sector (Vol. 3, No. 32; issue of May 12, 1981;

ISSN 0164-9949; pg. 4)

- New faces appear on Albany scene in the Finger Lake Times, of Geneva, on January 6, 1982
- DEMOCRATS WIN 3 RACES IN LEGISLATIVE ELECTIONS by Frank Lynn, in The New York Times on April 21, 1982
