= 193rd New York State Legislature =

New York state legislative session

←	192nd	194th	→
- New York State Capitol (2009)

Overview
- Legislative body: New York State Legislature
- Jurisdiction: New York, United States
- Term: January 1, 1999 – December 31, 2000

Senate
- Members: 61
- President: Lt. Gov. Mary Donohue (R)
- Temporary President: Joseph Bruno (R)
- Party control: Republican (35-26)

Assembly
- Members: 150
- Speaker: Sheldon Silver (D)
- Party control: Democratic (98-52)

Sessions
- 1st: January 6 – ?, 1999
- 2nd: January 5 – ?, 2000

The 193rd New York State Legislature, consisting of the New York State Senate and the New York State Assembly, met from January 6, 1999, to December 31, 2000, during the fifth and sixth years of George Pataki's governorship, in Albany.

== Background ==
Under the provisions of the New York Constitution of 1938 and the U.S. Supreme Court decision to follow the One man, one vote rule, re-apportioned in 1992 by the Legislature, 61 Senators and 150 assemblymen were elected in single-seat districts for two-year terms. Senate and Assembly districts consisted of approximately the same number of inhabitants, the area being apportioned contiguously without restrictions regarding county boundaries.

== Elections ==
The 1998 New York state election was held on November 3.

== Sessions ==
The Legislature met for the first regular session (the 222nd) at the State Capitol in Albany on January 6, 1999; and recessed indefinitely on

Sheldon Silver (Dem.) was re-elected Speaker of the Assembly.

Joseph Bruno (Rep.) was re-elected Temporary President of the Senate.

The Legislature met for the second regular session (the 223rd) at the State Capitol in Albany on January 5, 2000; and recessed indefinitely on

== State Senate ==
=== Senators ===
The asterisk (*) denotes members of the previous Legislature who continued in office as members of this Legislature. John Bonacic and Patricia McGee changed from the Assembly to the Senate at the beginning of this legislature.

Note: For brevity, the chairmanships omit the words "...the Committee on (the)..."

District	Senator	Party	Notes
1st	Kenneth LaValle*	Republican	
2nd	James J. Lack*	Republican	
3rd	Caesar Trunzo*	Republican	
4th	Owen H. Johnson*	Republican	
5th	Carl L. Marcellino*	Republican	
6th	Kemp Hannon*	Republican	
7th	Michael Balboni*	Republican	
8th	Charles J. Fuschillo Jr.*	Republican	
9th	Dean Skelos*	Republican	
10th	Alton R. Waldon Jr.*	Democrat	in December 1999 appointed to the Court of Claims;
10th	Malcolm Smith	Democrat	on March 28, 2000, elected to fill vacancy
11th	Frank Padavan*	Republican	
12th	Ada L. Smith*	Democrat	
13th	Daniel Hevesi	Democrat	
14th	George Onorato*	Democrat	
15th	Serphin R. Maltese*	Cons./Rep.	
16th	Leonard P. Stavisky*	Democrat	died on June 19, 1999
16th	Toby Ann Stavisky	Democrat	on November 2, 1999, elected to fill vacancy
17th	Nellie R. Santiago*	Democrat	
18th	Velmanette Montgomery*	Democrat	
19th	John L. Sampson*	Democrat	
20th	Marty Markowitz*	Democrat	
21st	Carl Kruger*	Democrat	
22nd	Seymour P. Lachman*	Democrat	
23rd	Vincent J. Gentile*	Democrat	
24th	John J. Marchi*	Republican	
25th	Martin Connor*	Democrat	Minority Leader
26th	Roy M. Goodman*	Republican	
27th	Thomas Duane	Democrat	
28th	Olga A. Méndez*	Democrat	
29th	David Paterson*	Democrat	
30th	Eric Schneiderman	Democrat	
31st	Efrain Gonzalez Jr.*	Democrat	
32nd	David Rosado*	Democrat	
33rd	Larry Seabrook*	Democrat	
34th	Guy J. Velella*	Republican	
35th	Nicholas A. Spano*	Republican	
36th	Suzi Oppenheimer*	Democrat	
37th	Vincent Leibell*	Republican	
38th	Joseph R. Holland*	Republican	in April 1999 appointed Social Services Commissioner of Rockland Co.
38th	Thomas P. Morahan	Republican	on May 25, 1999, elected to fill vacancy
39th	William J. Larkin Jr.*	Republican	
40th	John Bonacic*	Republican	
41st	Stephen M. Saland*	Republican	
42nd	Neil Breslin*	Democrat	
43rd	Joseph Bruno*	Republican	re-elected Temporary President
44th	Hugh T. Farley*	Republican	
45th	Ronald B. Stafford*	Republican	Chairman of Finance
46th	James W. Wright*	Republican	
47th	Raymond A. Meier*	Republican	
48th	Nancy Larraine Hoffmann*	Democrat	
49th	John A. DeFrancisco*	Republican	
50th	James L. Seward*	Republican	
51st	Thomas W. Libous*	Republican	
52nd	Randy Kuhl*	Republican	
53rd	Michael F. Nozzolio*	Republican	
54th	Richard A. Dollinger*	Democrat	
55th	James S. Alesi*	Republican	
56th	Patricia McGee*	Republican	
57th	Anthony Nanula*	Democrat	on November 2, 1999, elected Buffalo City Comptroller
57th	Alfred Coppola	Democrat	in March 2000, elected to fill vacancy
58th	William Stachowski*	Democrat	
59th	Dale M. Volker*	Republican	
60th	Mary Lou Rath*	Republican	
61st	George D. Maziarz*	Republican	

=== Employees ===
- Secretary:

== State Assembly ==
=== Assembly members ===
The asterisk (*) denotes members of the previous Legislature who continued in office as members of this Legislature.

Note: For brevity, the chairmanships omit the words "...the Committee on (the)..."

District	Assembly member	Party	Notes
1st	Patricia Acampora*	Republican	
2nd	Fred W. Thiele Jr.*	Republican	
3rd	Debra J. Mazzarelli*	Democrat	
4th	Steve Englebright*	Democrat	
5th	Paul E. Harenberg*	Democrat	
6th	Robert C. Wertz*	Republican	
7th	Thomas F. Barraga*	Republican	
8th	Phil Boyle*	Republican	
9th	John J. Flanagan*	Republican	
10th	James D. Conte*	Republican	
11th	Robert K. Sweeney*	Democrat	
12th	Steven L. Labriola*	Republican	
13th	David Sidikman*	Democrat	
14th	Marc Herbst*	Republican	
15th	Donna Ferrara*	Republican	
16th	Thomas DiNapoli*	Democrat	
17th	Maureen O'Connell*	Republican	
18th	Earlene Hill Hooper*	Democrat	
19th	Kate Murray*	Republican	
20th	Harvey Weisenberg*	Democrat	
21st	James Darcy	Republican	
22nd	Thomas Alfano*	Republican	
23rd	Audrey Pheffer*	Democrat	
24th	Mark Weprin*	Democrat	
25th	Brian M. McLaughlin*	Democrat	
26th	Ann-Margaret Carrozza*	Democrat	
27th	Nettie Mayersohn*	Democrat	
28th	Michael Cohen*	Democrat	
29th	William Scarborough*	Democrat	
30th	Margaret Markey*	Democrat	
31st	Pauline Rhodd-Cummings*	Democrat	
32nd	Vivian E. Cook*	Democrat	
33rd	Barbara M. Clark*	Democrat	
34th	Ivan C. Lafayette*	Democrat	
35th	Jeffrion L. Aubry*	Democrat	
36th	Denis J. Butler*	Democrat	
37th	Catherine Nolan*	Democrat	
38th	Anthony S. Seminerio*	Democrat	
39th	Frank R. Seddio	Democrat	
40th	Edward Griffith*	Democrat	
41st	Helene Weinstein*	Democrat	
42nd	Rhoda S. Jacobs*	Democrat	
43rd	Clarence Norman Jr.*	Democrat	
44th	James F. Brennan*	Democrat	
45th	Lena Cymbrowitz	Democrat	died on August 21, 2000
46th	Adele Cohen*	Democrat	
47th	William Colton*	Democrat	
48th	Dov Hikind*	Democrat	
49th	Peter J. Abbate Jr.*	Democrat	
50th	Joseph R. Lentol*	Democrat	
51st	Félix W. Ortiz*	Democrat	
52nd	Joan Millman*	Democrat	
53rd	Vito J. Lopez*	Democrat	
54th	Darryl C. Towns*	Democrat	
55th	William F. Boyland*	Democrat	
56th	Albert Vann*	Democrat	
57th	Roger L. Green*	Democrat	
58th	N. Nick Perry*	Democrat	
59th	Elizabeth Connelly*	Democrat	
60th	Eric N. Vitaliano*	Democrat	
61st	Robert A. Straniere*	Republican	
62nd	Sheldon Silver*	Democrat	re-elected Speaker
63rd	Steven Sanders*	Democrat	
64th	Richard N. Gottfried*	Democrat	
65th	Alexander B. Grannis*	Democrat	
66th	Deborah J. Glick*	Democrat	
67th	Scott Stringer*	Democrat	
68th	Nelson Antonio Denis*	Democrat	
69th	Edward C. Sullivan*	Democrat	
70th	Keith L. T. Wright*	Democrat	
71st	Herman D. Farrell Jr.*	Democrat	Chairman of Ways and Means
72nd	Adriano Espaillat*	Democrat	
73rd	John Ravitz*	Republican	
74th	Carmen E. Arroyo*	Democrat	
75th	Rubén Díaz Jr.*	Democrat	
76th	Peter M. Rivera*	Democrat	
77th	Aurelia Greene*	Democrat	
78th	Roberto Ramirez*	Democrat	
79th	Gloria Davis*	Democrat	
80th	Jeffrey D. Klein*	Democrat	
81st	Jeffrey Dinowitz*	Democrat	
82nd	Stephen B. Kaufman*	Democrat	
83rd	Samuel Bea Jr.*	Democrat	
84th	J. Gary Pretlow*	Democrat	
85th	Ronald C. Tocci*	Democrat	
86th	Richard L. Brodsky*	Democrat	
87th	Mike Spano*	Republican	
88th	Audrey Hochberg*	Democrat	
89th	Naomi C. Matusow*	Democrat	
90th	Sandy Galef*	Democrat	
91st	Willis Stephens*	Republican	
92nd	Alexander J. Gromack*	Democrat	
93rd	Samuel Colman*	Democrat	
94th	Nancy Calhoun*	Republican	
95th	Howard Mills III	Republican	
96th	Thomas J. Kirwan*	Republican	
97th	Joel M. Miller*	Republican	
98th	Jacob E. Gunther III*	Democrat	
99th	Patrick R. Manning*	Republican	
100th	Robert A. D'Andrea*	Republican	
101st	Kevin A. Cahill	Democrat	
102nd	John Faso*	Republican	Minority Leader
103rd	James Tedisco*	Republican	
104th	John McEneny*	Democrat	
105th	Paul D. Tonko*	Democrat	
106th	Ronald Canestrari*	Democrat	
107th	Robert G. Prentiss*	Republican	
108th	Pat M. Casale*	Republican	
109th	Betty Little*	Republican	
110th	Chris Ortloff*	Republican	
111th	Bill Magee*	Democrat	
112th	Dede Scozzafava	Republican	
113th	Marc W. Butler*	Republican	
114th	H. Robert Nortz*	Republican	
115th	David R. Townsend Jr.*	Republican	
116th	RoAnn Destito*	Democrat	
117th	Frances T. Sullivan*	Republican	
118th	Michael J. Bragman*	Democrat	Majority Leader
119th	Joan Christensen*	Democrat	
120th	William Magnarelli	Democrat	
121st	Harold C. Brown Jr.*	Republican	
122nd	Clifford W. Crouch*	Republican	
123rd	Jay J. Dinga*	Republican	
124th	Robert J. Warner*	Republican	
125th	Martin A. Luster*	Democrat	
126th	Daniel J. Fessenden*	Republican	
126th	Gary Finch	Republican	on November 2, 1999, elected to fill vacancy
127th	George H. Winner Jr.*	Republican	
128th	Bob Oaks*	Republican	
129th	Craig J. Doran*	Republican	
129th	Brian Kolb	Republican	in February 2000 elected to fill vacancy
130th	James Bacalles*	Republican	
131st	Susan V. John*	Democrat	
132nd	Joseph D. Morelle*	Democrat	
133rd	David F. Gantt*	Democrat	
134th	Joseph Robach*	Democrat	
135th	David Koon*	Democrat	
136th	Jerry Johnson*	Republican	
137th	Charles H. Nesbitt*	Republican	
138th	Robert A. Daly	Republican	
139th	David E. Seaman*	Republican	
140th	Robin Schimminger*	Democrat	
141st	Arthur O. Eve*	Democrat	
142nd	James P. Hayes	Republican	
143rd	Paul Tokasz*	Democrat	
144th	Sam Hoyt*	Democrat	
145th	Brian Higgins	Democrat	
146th	Richard A. Smith	Democrat	
147th	Daniel Burling	Republican	
148th	Sandra Lee Wirth*	Republican	
149th	Catharine Young	Republican	
150th	William Parment*	Democrat	

=== Employees ===
- Clerk: Francine Misasi

== Sources ==
- Senate election results at NYS Board of Elections
- Assembly election results at NYS Board of Elections
