= James D. Conte =

American politician

Member of the New York State Assembly from the 10th district
- In office March 15, 1988 – October 16, 2012
- Preceded by: Toni Rettaliata
- Succeeded by: Chad A. Lupinacci

Personal details
- Born: January 1, 1959 Huntington Station, New York
- Died: October 16, 2012 (aged 53)
- Party: Republican
- Spouse: Debra (Ingalls) Conte
- Children: 3
- Education: SUNY Stony Brook (1982)
- Profession: Politician

James D. Conte (January 1, 1959 – October 16, 2012) was an American politician from New York. He served as a Republican New York State Assemblyman for the 10th District from 1988 until his death.

== Personal life ==
Conte was a lifetime resident of Huntington Station. He attended St. Hugh of Lincoln Elementary School and Huntington High School. Conte received a B.A. degree in economics and political science from the State University of New York at Stony Brook in 1982. He married Debra Ingalls, and they had three children.

Conte began his political career as an intern to State Senator James J. Lack and also worked for State Senator Martin J. Knorr. He worked for Suffolk County Executive Michael LoGrande (1986–87) and served as a legislative aide to Assemblywoman Toni Rettaliata. On March 15, 1988, Conte was elected to the New York State Assembly to fill the vacancy caused by the election of Rettaliata as Supervisor of the Town of Huntington. He was re-elected many times, and remained in the Assembly until his death in 2012, sitting in the 187th, 188th, 189th, 190th, 191st, 192nd, 193rd, 194th, 195th, 196th, 197th, 198th and 199th New York State Legislatures.

Conte was diagnosed with T-cell lymphoma in the spring of 2011. In 2012, he chose not to seek another term in office in order to focus on treatment and recovery. Though he received chemotherapy treatments, the cancer continued to spread. Conte died on October 16, 2012.

New York State Assembly
Preceded by Toni Rettaliata	New York State Assembly; 10th District; 1988–2012	Succeeded by Chad A. Lupinacci
