= Matusow =

Matusow or Matusov is a surname of Russian origin. Notable people with this surname include:

- Harvey Matusow (1926–2002), informant for the FBI during the McCarthy era, author of False Witness
- Mike Matusow (born 1968), American professional poker player
- Naomi C. Matusow (born 1938), New York politician
