= Senator Dollinger =

Senator Dollinger may refer to:

- Isidore Dollinger (1903–2000), New York State Senate
- Richard A. Dollinger (born 1951), New York State Senate
