= Elizabeth Hoffman =

Elizabeth Hoffman may refer to:

- Elizabeth Hoffman (actress) (1927–2023), American actress
- Elizabeth Hoffman (professor) (born 1946), a.k.a. Betsy Hoffman, vice president of Iowa State University, former president of the University of Colorado
- Elizabeth C. Hoffman (1942–2007), a.k.a. Betty Hoffman, New York politician
- Elizabeth Hoffman, winner of Miss South Dakota Teen USA 2008
- Elizabeth Maud Hoffman (1927–2009), Australian indigenous rights activist

== See also ==
- Elizabeth (disambiguation)
- Hoffman (disambiguation)
- Elizabeth Cobbs (born 1956), American historian and author who sometimes uses the pen name Elizabeth Cobbs Hoffman
