= Neil W. Kelleher =

American politician

Member of the New York State Assembly from the 100th district
- In office 1983–1992
- Preceded by: Glenn E. Warren
- Succeeded by: Robert A. D'Andrea

Member of the New York State Assembly from the 106th district
- In office 1973–1982
- Preceded by: Fred W. Droms, Jr.
- Succeeded by: Michael R. McNulty

Member of the New York State Assembly from the 101st district
- In office 1967–1972
- Preceded by: Warren J. Sinsheimer
- Succeeded by: H. Clark Bell

Cornelius "Neil" W. Kelleher (May 9, 1923 – September 4, 2008) was an American politician from New York.

== Life ==
Kelleher was born on May 9, 1923, in Troy, New York, the son of Cornelius J. Kelleher and Helen Fleming Kelleher. He attended St. Augustine's School and Lansingburgh High School. During World War II he served in the U.S. Navy fighting in the Pacific theater. He entered politics as a Republican. In 1957, he was appointed to fill a vacancy as alderman of Troy (17th Ward), and in 1960 he was elected Mayor of Troy.

He was a member of the New York State Assembly from 1967 to 1992, sitting in the 177th, 178th, 179th, 180th, 181st, 182nd, 183rd, 184th, 185th, 186th, 187th, 188th and 189th New York State Legislatures.

He was a member of the New York State Board of Elections from 1998 to 2008.

He died on September 4, 2008, in St. Mary's Hospital in Troy, New York; and was buried at the Gerald B. H. Solomon Saratoga National Cemetery, in Schuylerville.

His son, Neil J. Kelleher, was elected to the Rensselaer County Legislature in 1989, subsequently serving in that body for 20 years. In 1995 he became Chairman of the Legislature, and would serve in that capacity until losing his re-election bid in 2009.

New York State Assembly
Preceded by Warren J. Sinsheimer	New York State Assembly; 101st District; 1967–1972	Succeeded by H. Clark Bell
Preceded by Fred W. Droms, Jr.	New York State Assembly; 106th District; 1973–1982	Succeeded by Michael R. McNulty
Preceded by Glenn E. Warren	New York State Assembly; 100th District; 1983–1992	Succeeded by Robert A. D'Andrea
