= Joan B. Hague =

American politician

Joan B. Hague is an American politician from New York, United States.

== Life ==
She was born Joan Spillane Barber in Glens Falls, Warren County, New York. She graduated from Tusculum College in 1951, and later attended for some time Fairleigh Dickinson University in New Jersey. In 1950, she married fellow student Roger S. Hague, and they had three children.

Joan B. Hague entered politics as a Republican. She was Warren County Commissioner of Jurors from 1971 to 1978, a delegate to the 1972 Republican National Convention, and a member of the New York State Assembly from 1979 to 1982, sitting in the 183rd and 184th New York State Legislatures. At the 1982 re-apportionment, the area of her residence was joined with a large part of Saratoga County, previously part of the 108th District. She declined to run in a primary against the incumbent assemblyman of the 108th District Robert A. D'Andrea, and in July 1982 announced that she would not seek re-election later that year.

Later she married Edward Wylie Smith (1921–2011), and became known as Joan Hague Smith or Joan Barber Smith.

She is a Life Trustee of Tusculum College.

New York State Assembly
Preceded by Gerald B. H. Solomon	New York State Assembly; 110th District; 1979–1982	Succeeded by Andrew W. Ryan, Jr.
