= John D. Perry =

American politician

Member of the New York State Senate
- In office January 1, 1975 – December 31, 1992
- Preceded by: Thomas Laverne
- Succeeded by: Richard Dollinger
- Constituency: 53rd district (1975-1982); 54th district (1983-1992)

Personal details
- Born: 1935 (age 90–91) Rochester, New York, U.S.
- Party: Democratic

John D. Perry (born c. 1935) is an American politician from New York.

== Life ==
He was born about 1935 in Rochester, New York. He graduated B.A. in economics and M.A. in social science/education from Syracuse University. He also graduated M.S.T. in economics from the University of Missouri. Then he taught history and economics at several high schools and the Rochester Institute of Technology. He married Christine, and they have three children. They live in Brighton.

He was a Democratic member of the New York State Senate from 1975 to 1992, sitting in the 181st, 182nd, 183rd, 184th, 185th, 186th, 187th, 188th and 189th New York State Legislatures.

New York State Senate
Preceded by Thomas Laverne	New York State Senate; 53rd District; 1975–1982	Succeeded by L. Paul Kehoe
Preceded by William M. Steinfeldt	New York State Senate; 54th District; 1983–1992	Succeeded by Richard A. Dollinger
