= Frances T. Sullivan =

American politician

Frances T. Sullivan (née Taylor) is an American politician from New York.

== Life ==
She was born Frances Taylor in Volney, Oswego County, New York, the daughter of Elmer E. Taylor (died 1994) and Marion (Foster) Taylor (1922–2014). She graduated B.A. in sociology from Keuka College. She married Eugene Francis "Pat" Sullivan Jr. (1928–1987), later a New York Supreme Court Justice, and they had three children, one of whom, Katherine, was married to United States Representative John M. McHugh (R-NY).

Taylor worked for several local government agencies, and was at times a social service worker, an academic counselor and a probation officer. She also entered politics as a Republican.

She was a member of the New York State Assembly from 1991 to 2002, sitting in the 189th, 190th, 191st, 192nd, 193rd and 194th New York State Legislatures. She was an alternate delegate to the 1996 Republican National Convention.

New York State Assembly
Preceded by Ray T. Chesbro	New York State Assembly; 117th District; 1991–2002	Succeeded by Marc W. Butler
