= Martin M. Solomon =

American politician

Martin Solomon

Member of the New York State Senate
- In office February 14, 1978 – November 7, 1995
- Preceded by: Albert B. Lewis
- Succeeded by: Seymour Lachman
- Constituency: 22nd district (1978-1982); 19th district (1983-1992); 22nd district (1993-1995)

Personal details
- Born: January 24, 1950 (age 76)
- Party: Democratic

Martin Michael Solomon (born January 24, 1950) is an American lawyer and politician from New York.

== Life ==
He was born to a Jewish family. He graduated with a B.A. magna cum laude from SUNY Albany and a J.D. from New York Law School in June 1975. He practiced law in Brooklyn, and entered politics as a Democrat.

In 1978, he was elected to the New York State Senate, to fill the vacancy caused by the appointment of Albert B. Lewis as State Superintendent of Insurance. Solomon was re-elected several times, and remained in the Senate until 1995, sitting in the 182nd, 183rd, 184th, 185th, 186th, 187th, 188th, 189th, 190th and 191st New York State Legislatures.

In November 1995, he was elected to the New York City Civil Court; and in November 2003 to the New York Supreme Court (2nd. D.). In May 2012, he was appointed to the Appellate Term for the 2nd, 11th and 13th districts.

New York State Senate
Preceded by Albert B. Lewis	New York State Senate; 22nd District; 1978–1982	Succeeded by Anna V. Jefferson
Preceded by Marty Markowitz	New York State Senate; 19th District; 1983–1992	Succeeded by Howard E. Babbush
Preceded by Velmanette Montgomery	New York State Senate; 22nd District; 1993–1995	Succeeded by Seymour P. Lachman
