= Clarence D. Rappleyea Jr. =

American politician

Member of the New York State Assembly from the 122nd district
- In office January 3, 1973 – July 1995
- Preceded by: Lloyd Stephen Riford Jr.
- Succeeded by: Clifford W. Crouch

Personal details
- Born: November 2, 1933 Norwich, New York, U.S.
- Died: September 4, 2016 (aged 82) Albany, New York, U.S.
- Party: Republican
- Education: University at Albany, SUNY; Cornell University

Clarence D. Rappleyea Jr. (November 2, 1933 – September 4, 2016) was an American lawyer and politician from New York.

== Biography ==
Rappleyea Jr. was born on November 2, 1933, in Norwich, Chenango County, New York. He attended Wagner College. He graduated A.B. from SUNY Albany in 1957, and J.D. from Cornell Law School in 1962. He was admitted to the bar in 1964, and practiced in Norwich. He also entered politics as a Republican, and was City Attorney of Norwich from 1970 to 1973.

He was a member of the New York State Assembly (122nd D.) from 1973 to 1995, sitting in the 180th, 181st, 182nd, 183rd, 184th, 185th, 186th, 187th, 188th, 189th, 190th and 191st New York State Legislatures. He was Minority Leader from 1983 to June 1995, and resigned his seat in July 1995.

He was Chairman of the New York Power Authority from July 1995 to January 31, 2001.

In January 2001, the administrative head-office of the Power Authority, in White Plains, Westchester County, was named in his honor as the "Clarence D. Rappleyea Building". Rappleyea died on September 4, 2016, at the age of 82.

New York State Assembly
Preceded by Lloyd Stephen Riford, Jr.	New York State Assembly; 122nd District; 1973–1995	Succeeded by Clifford Crouch
Preceded by James L. Emery	Minority Leader in the New York State Assembly; 1983–1995	Succeeded by Thomas M. Reynolds
