= John B. Sheffer II =

American politician

John B. Sheffer II (born March 25, 1948) is an American lawyer, university professor and politician from New York.

== Life ==
He was born on March 25, 1948. He attended school in Williamsville, Erie County, New York. He graduated B.A. from Wheaton College in Wheaton, Illinois. He graduated J.D. from Syracuse University College of Law.

He entered politics as a Republican, and was Mayor of Williamsville from 1977 to 1978.

He was a member of the New York State Assembly from 1979 to 1988, sitting in the 183rd, 184th, 185th, 186th and 187th New York State Legislatures.

He was a member of the New York State Senate from 1989 to 1993, sitting in the 188th, 189th, and 190th New York State Legislatures. He resigned his seat on September 19, 1993, to pursue an academic career at the University at Buffalo.

Beginning in January 1994, he taught at the University at Buffalo Law School and the School of Architecture and Planning. He also held administrative posts at the university, and was Director of the Institute for Local Governance and Regional Growth from 1997 to 2005.

New York State Assembly
Preceded by G. James Fremming	New York State Assembly; 141st District; 1979–1982	Succeeded by Arthur O. Eve
Preceded by Carol A. Siwek	New York State Assembly; 142nd District; 1983–1988	Succeeded by Richard R. Anderson
New York State Senate
Preceded by Walter J. Floss Jr.	New York State Senate; 60th District; 1989–1993	Succeeded by Mary Lou Rath
