= Francine Misasi =

American politician

Francine M. Misasi (May 25, 1944 – June 10, 2001) was an American politician from New York.

== Life ==
She was born on May 25, 1944, in Glasco, Ulster County, New York. She graduated from Saugerties High School in 1962.

In 1973, she moved to Albany, and became a committee clerk of the New York State Legislature. Later she was a chief committee clerk, and was Journal Clerk of the Assembly from 1979 to 1984.

She was Clerk of the New York State Assembly from 1985 to 2000, officiating in the 186th, 187th, 188th, 189th, 190th, 191st, 192nd and 193rd New York State Legislatures.

She died on June 10, 2001.

Government offices
| Preceded by Catherine A. Carey | Clerk of the New York State Assembly; 1985–2000 | Succeeded by ? |
