= Nellie R. Santiago =

American politician (born 1943)

Nellie R. Santiago-Fernandez (born June 14, 1943) is an American politician from New York.

== Life ==
She was born on June 14, 1943, in New York City. She graduated B.A. from Hunter College in 1970, M.A. from Columbia University in 1972, and Ed.D. from the University of Massachusetts Amherst in 1977. She worked in health care and entered politics as a Democrat. She became an aide to State Senator Howard E. Babbush in 1987. She married Benito Fernandez, who ran Brooklyn Manor, a home for adult mentally ill persons, which came under scrutiny by the health authorities in 2001.

She was a member of the New York State Senate from 1993 to 2002, sitting in the 190th, 191st, 192nd, 193rd and 194th New York State Legislatures. In September 2002, she ran for re-nomination in the Democratic primary, but was defeated by Martin Malave Dilan. In November 2002, she ran for re-election on the Republican ticket, but was defeated again by Dilan. In September 2003, she challenged the incumbent Erik Martin Dilan in the Democratic primary for the 37th New York City Council District, but was defeated again.

New York State Senate
Preceded by Howard E. Babbush	New York State Senate; 17th District; 1993–2002	Succeeded by Martin Malave Dilan
