= Catherine A. Carey =

American lawyer

Catherine Ann Carey (born 1945) is an American lawyer and politician from New York.

== Life ==
She was born in 1945, in Lackawanna, Erie County, New York, the daughter of William James Carey and Mary Clare (Kuebler) Carey. She graduated with a B.A. from Daemen College in 1967.

She was clerk of the New York State Assembly from 1975 to 1984, officiating in the 181st, 182nd, 183rd, 184th and 185th New York State Legislatures. In 1980, she graduated with an M.P.A. from the State University of New York at Albany.

She graduated from Albany Law School in 1987, was admitted to the bar in 1988, and practices law in Buffalo, New York.

Government offices
| Preceded by Thomas H. Bartzos | Clerk of the New York State Assembly; 1975–1984 | Succeeded by Francine Misasi |
