= Chris Ortloff =

American politician

Member of the New York State Assembly
- In office February 18, 1986 – June 1, 2006
- Preceded by: Andrew Ryan
- Succeeded by: Janet Duprey
- Constituency: 110th district (1986–2002); 114th district (2003–2006)

Personal details
- Born: September 20, 1947 (age 78) Lake Placid, New York, U.S.
- Party: Republican

George C. "Chris" Ortloff (born September 20, 1947) is an American journalist, politician, and convicted sex offender from New York.

== Biography ==
Ortloff was born on September 20, 1947, in Lake Placid, Essex County, New York. He graduated M.A. from Rensselaer Polytechnic Institute in 1969, and M.A. in journalism from the University of Michigan. He served two tours of duty in the Vietnam War from 1970 to 1972. Ortloff served as the Chief of Ceremonies and Awards for the Lake Placid Olympic Organizing Committee for the 1980 Winter Olympics in Lake Placid. He was a news anchor for WPTZ TV (NBC affiliate) from 1982 to 1986.

He entered politics as a Republican. On February 18, 1986, he was elected to the New York State Assembly, to fill the vacancy caused by the election of Andrew W. Ryan, Jr. as D.A. of Clinton County. Ortloff was re-elected many times and remained in the Assembly until 2006, sitting in the 186th, 187th, 188th, 189th, 190th, 191st, 192nd, 193rd, 194th, 195th and 196th New York State Legislatures. Afterwards he was appointed to the New York State Board of Parole.

On October 13, 2008, Ortloff was arrested on federal charges of attempting to solicit sex with minors. On December 24, 2008, he pleaded guilty to a felony charge of online enticement of minors. His sentencing was originally set for April 23, 2009, but was pushed back four times, first to August 11, 2009, then to November 9, 2009, to March 8, 2010, and finally to July 13, 2010. Ortloff surrendered to authorities to begin serving time prior to his actual sentencing. On August 9, 2010, he was finally sentenced to 150 months in prison, lifetime supervision, and a $50,000 fine.

As of February 2019, Ortloff was incarcerated at Federal Correctional Institution, Danbury. He was released October 2019.

New York State Assembly
| Preceded by Andrew W. Ryan, Jr. | New York State Assembly; 110th District; 1986–2002 | Succeeded by Jim Tedisco |
| Preceded by H. Robert Nortz | New York State Assembly; 114th District; 2003–2006 | Succeeded by Janet Duprey |
