= Audrey Hochberg =

American politician

- Born: Audrey Elaine Golden; June 26, 1933; Stamford, Connecticut, U.S.
- Died: June 8, 2005 (aged 71)
- Occupation: American State Politician
- Years active: 1972-2000
- Children: Three. Carol Hochberg, Brenda Hochberg, Judith Hochberg.

Audrey Hochberg (June 26, 1933 – June 8, 2005) was an American politician from New York.

== Life ==
She was born Audrey Elaine Golden on June 26, 1933, in Stamford, Fairfield County, Connecticut, the daughter of Abraham H. Golden and Fannie (Dodek) Golden. She graduated B.S. in economics from Radcliffe College in 1955. Then she worked as a securities analyst. She married Herbert L. Hochberg, and they had three daughters. They lived in Scarsdale, Westchester County, New York. She was Jewish.

She became active in the anti-war movement triggered by the Vietnam War, and entered politics as a Democrat. She was a member of the Westchester County Legislature from 1972 to 1992; and a member of the New York State Assembly from 1993 to 2000, sitting in the 190th, 191st, 192nd and 193rd New York State Legislatures. In March 2000, she announced that she would not seek re-election later that year.

She died on June 8, 2005, in NewYork–Presbyterian Hospital in Manhattan, of uterine cancer.

New York State Assembly
Preceded by Gregory P. Young	New York State Assembly; 88th District; 1993–2000	Succeeded by Amy Paulin
