= Joseph R. Holland =

American politician

Joseph R. Holland (born June 12, 1936) is an American politician from New York.

Holland was born on June 12, 1936, in Takoma Park, Montgomery County, Maryland. He joined the U.S. Marine Corps Reserve in 1953, and rose to the rank of first lieutenant. He graduated with a B.S. in public administration from the University of Maryland in 1960. Later, he moved to Rockland County, New York. In 1973, he founded the Rockland County Sports Hall of Fame.

Holland entered politics as a Republican, and was County Clerk of Rockland County from 1979 to 1988.

Holland was a member of the New York State Assembly (92nd D.) in 1989 and 1990; and a member of the New York State Senate from 1991 to 1999, sitting in the 189th, 190th, 191st, 192nd and 193rd New York State Legislatures. In April 1999, he was appointed as Social Services Commissioner of Rockland County.

New York State Assembly
Preceded by Robert J. Connor	New York State Assembly; 92nd District; 1989–1990	Succeeded by Alexander J. Gromack
New York State Senate
Preceded by Eugene Levy	New York State Senate; 38th District; 1991–1999	Succeeded by Thomas P. Morahan
