= Michael J. Bragman =

American politician (1940–2023)

Majority Leader of the New York State Assembly
- In office 1993–2000
- Preceded by: James R. Tallon
- Succeeded by: Paul Tokasz

Member of the New York House of Representatives from the 118th district
- In office 1981–2001
- Preceded by: Leonard F. Bersani
- Succeeded by: William E. Sanford

Personal details
- Born: Michael Jon Bragman; August 11, 1940 Syracuse, New York, U.S.
- Died: October 13, 2023 (aged 83) Syracuse, New York, U.S.
- Party: Democratic
- Spouse: Suzanne Collier (m. 1986)
- Children: 3
- Education: Syracuse University
- Profession: Teacher

Michael Jon Bragman (August 11, 1940 – October 13, 2023) was an American politician from New York. A member of the Democratic Party, he served in the New York State Assembly from 1981 to 2001, and was the assembly's majority leader from 1993 to 2000. He left politics after unsuccessfully attempting to remove then-Speaker of the Assembly Sheldon Silver from his post in 2000.

== Background ==
Michael Jon Bragman was born on August 11, 1940, in Syracuse, New York. He graduated from Syracuse University in 1963, and worked as a schoolteacher.

== Career ==
Bragman entered politics as a Democrat, and was elected to the Cicero Town Council in 1965, and to the Onondaga County Legislature in 1969. He was a member of the New York State Assembly from 1981 to 2001, sitting in the 184th, 185th, 186th, 187th, 188th, 189th, 190th, 191st, 192nd, 193rd and 194th New York State Legislatures. During his first term, he was indicted on charges stemming from his time in the county legislature; he was accused of seeking $1.6 million in bribe money from a company selling an incineration plant, though he was acquitted.

The New York Times said that Bragman "exerted a profound influence in the Assembly. He was credited with successfully sponsoring more than 300 bills and pumping some $200 million in pork-barrel funding for local projects in his Central New York State district, which was centered in Syracuse".

== Challenge to Sheldon Silver ==
A centrist Democrat, he served as Majority Leader from 1993 to 2000, when he lost his position after leading an attempted coup against Speaker Sheldon Silver. The move came amid criticism from some Democrats in the assembly that Silver's leadership style was too aloof. However, Bragman's attempt failed: after he announced his intent to overthrow Silver, the speaker demoted two high-ranking legislators who openly supported Bragman and made clear he would punish others who voted against him. In the floor vote on May 23, 2000, Silver prevailed by a vote of 85 to 63.

Bragman's political career was destroyed by his efforts to overthrow Silver. He lost his leadership position and resigned his seat in December 2001, where he was succeeded by Republican William E. Sanford in a special election.

== Personal life and death ==
In 1986, Bragman married Suzanne Collier, and they had three children. He died in Syracuse on October 13, 2023, at the age of 83.

== Notes ==
New York State Assembly
Preceded by Leonard F. Bersani	New York State Assembly; 118th District; 1981–2001	Succeeded by William E. Sanford
Political offices
Preceded by James R. Tallon	Majority Leader of the New York State Assembly; 1993–2000	Succeeded by Paul Tokasz
