= Chloe Ann O'Neil =

American politician

Chloe Ann O'Neil (September 7, 1943 – November 15, 2018) was an American politician from New York.

== Life ==
She was born Chloe Ann Tehon on September 7, 1943, in Watseka, Iroquois County, Illinois, the daughter of Stephen W. Tehon and Betty Irene "Mae" (Albright) Tehon. In 1952, her family moved to Syracuse, New York where her father worked for General Electric. She graduated B.S. in 1967, and later M.S., both from SUNY Potsdam. Then she taught school. In 1966, she married college professor John G. A. O'Neil, and they had two children. They lived in Parishville. Her husband was a member of the New York State Assembly from 1981 to 1992.

She also entered politics as a Republican, and was an aide to her husband during his Assembly tenure. Her husband died on December 10, 1992, in a car accident, and O'Neil was nominated by the Republicans to run in the special election to fill the vacancy. She was elected on February 16, 1993, and remained in the Assembly (112th D.) until 1998, sitting in the 190th, 191st and 192nd New York State Legislatures.

Chloe was killed in a two-car collision on November 15, 2018, in Dickinson, New York.

New York State Assembly
Preceded by John G. A. O'Neil	New York State Assembly; 112th District; 1993–1998	Succeeded by Dede Scozzafava
