= Walter J. Floss Jr. =

American politician (1923–2018)

Member of the New York State Senate
- In office January 1, 1979 – December 31, 1988
- Preceded by: James T. McFarland
- Succeeded by: John B. Sheffer II
- Constituency: 59th district (1979-1982); 60th district (1983-1988)

Personal details
- Born: February 13, 1923 Buffalo, New York
- Died: December 8, 2018 (aged 95)
- Party: Republican

Walter J. Floss Jr. (February 13, 1923 – December 8, 2018) was an American politician from New York.

== Life ==
Floss was born on February 13, 1923, in Buffalo, New York. He attended Buffalo Technical High School. He served in the U.S. Navy from June 1941 to 1945. Afterwards he engaged in the insurance business in East Amherst, New York. He married Grayce T. Thornberry (1924–2004), and they had ten children.

Floss entered politics as a Republican, and was a member of the Town Council of Clarence from 1963 to 1967, and a member of the Erie County Legislature from 1968 to 1978.

Floss was a member of the New York State Senate from 1979 to 1988, sitting in the 183rd, 184th, 185th, 186th and 187th New York State Legislatures. In 1986, he sponsored the law that made it possible to use credit cards at liquor stores in the State of New York.

Floss died on December 8, 2018, at the age of 95.

New York State Senate
Preceded by James T. McFarland	New York State Senate; 59th District; 1979–1982	Succeeded by Dale M. Volker
Preceded by John B. Daly	New York State Senate; 60th District; 1983–1988	Succeeded by ?
