= Elizabeth C. Hoffman =

American politician

Member of the New York State Assembly from the 139th district
- In office 1993–1995
- Preceded by: Matthew J. Murphy Jr.
- Succeeded by: David E. Seaman

Mayor of North Tonawanda, New York
- In office 1980–1992

Member of the North Tonawanda Common Council
- In office 1978–1979

Personal details
- Born: Elizabeth Booth; January 26, 1942 Buffalo, New York, U.S.
- Died: August 16, 2007 (aged 65) Tonawanda, New York, U.S.
- Party: Republican
- Education: Mount Saint Mary Academy; George Washington University
- Profession: Politician

Elizabeth C. Hoffman (January 26, 1942 – August 16, 2007) was an American politician from New York.

== Life ==
She was born Elizabeth Booth on January 26, 1942, in Buffalo, New York. She attended Mount St. Mary Academy and George Washington University. She engaged in the real estate business in North Tonawanda, Niagara County, New York.

She entered politics as a Republican, and was a member of the North Tonawanda Common Council from 1978 to 1979; and Mayor of North Tonawanda from 1980 to 1992.

She was a member of the New York State Assembly from 1993 to 1995, sitting in the 190th and 191st New York State Legislatures. She decided to run for the State Senate seat vacated by John B. Daly, and resigned her Assembly seat in February 1995. She ran on the Conservative and Right to Life tickets but, on March 14, was defeated by the Republican nominee George D. Maziarz.

She died on August 17, 2007, at her home in Tonawanda, Erie County, New York.

New York State Assembly
Preceded by Matthew J. Murphy, Jr.	New York State Assembly; 139th District; 1993–1995	Succeeded by David E. Seaman
