= Debra J. Mazzarelli =

American politician

Member of the New York State Assembly from the 3rd district
- In office January 1, 1995 – December 31, 2000
- Preceded by: Icilio W. Bianchi, Jr.
- Succeeded by: Patricia Eddington

Personal details
- Born: April 7, 1955 (age 71) Bay Shore, New York
- Party: Republican (until 1997); Democratic (1997-present)

Debra Jean Mazzarelli (born April 7, 1955) is an American politician from New York.

== Life ==
She was born April 7, 1955, in Bay Shore, Suffolk County, New York. She graduated B.A. in political science from St. Joseph's College.

She entered politics as a Republican. In November 1994, she unseated the Democratic Assemblyman Icilio W. Bianchi, Jr. She was a member of the New York State Assembly (3rd D.) from 1995 to 2000, sitting in the 191st, 192nd and 193rd New York State Legislatures. On May 14, 1997, she became a Democrat. In September 1998, Mazzarelli defeated Bianchi in the Democratic primary. In November 1998, Mazzarelli won a third term, again defeating Bianchi who ran on the Republican ticket.

She lives in Patchogue, New York, and engages in the real estate business.

New York State Assembly
Preceded by Icilio W. Bianchi, Jr.	Member of the New York State Assembly from the 3rd district 1995–2000	Succeeded by Patricia Eddington
