= Vincent J. Graber Sr. =

American politician

Member of the New York State Assembly from the 148th District
- In office 1975–1994
- Preceded by: Dale M. Volker
- Succeeded by: Sandra Lee Wirth

Personal details
- Born: May 17, 1931 South Buffalo, New York
- Died: July 2, 2014 (aged 83) Wilmington, North Carolina

Vincent J. Graber Sr. (May 17, 1931 – July 2, 2014) was an American politician.

== Background ==
Graber was the son of Howard J. Graber and Eileen Graber (née Cavanaugh). Born and raised in South Buffalo, New York, he went to South Park High School and then served in the United States Army in 1952. In 1954, Graber worked for South Buffalo Railway Company and then lived in West Seneca, New York. After he left the New York Assembly, Graber represented clients in Albany, New York. He died in Wilmington, North Carolina from cancer.

== Political career ==
He entered politics as a Democrat, and served on the West Seneca Town Board. He was a member of the New York State Assembly from 1975 to 1994, sitting in the 181st, 182nd, 183rd, 184th, 185th, 186th, 187th, 188th, 189th and 190th New York State Legislatures. He sponsored the seat belt plan that passed the New York legislature in 1984.

New York State Assembly
Preceded by Dale M. Volker	New York State Assembly; 148th District; 1975–1994	Succeeded by Sandra Lee Wirth
