= Eileen C. Dugan =

American politician

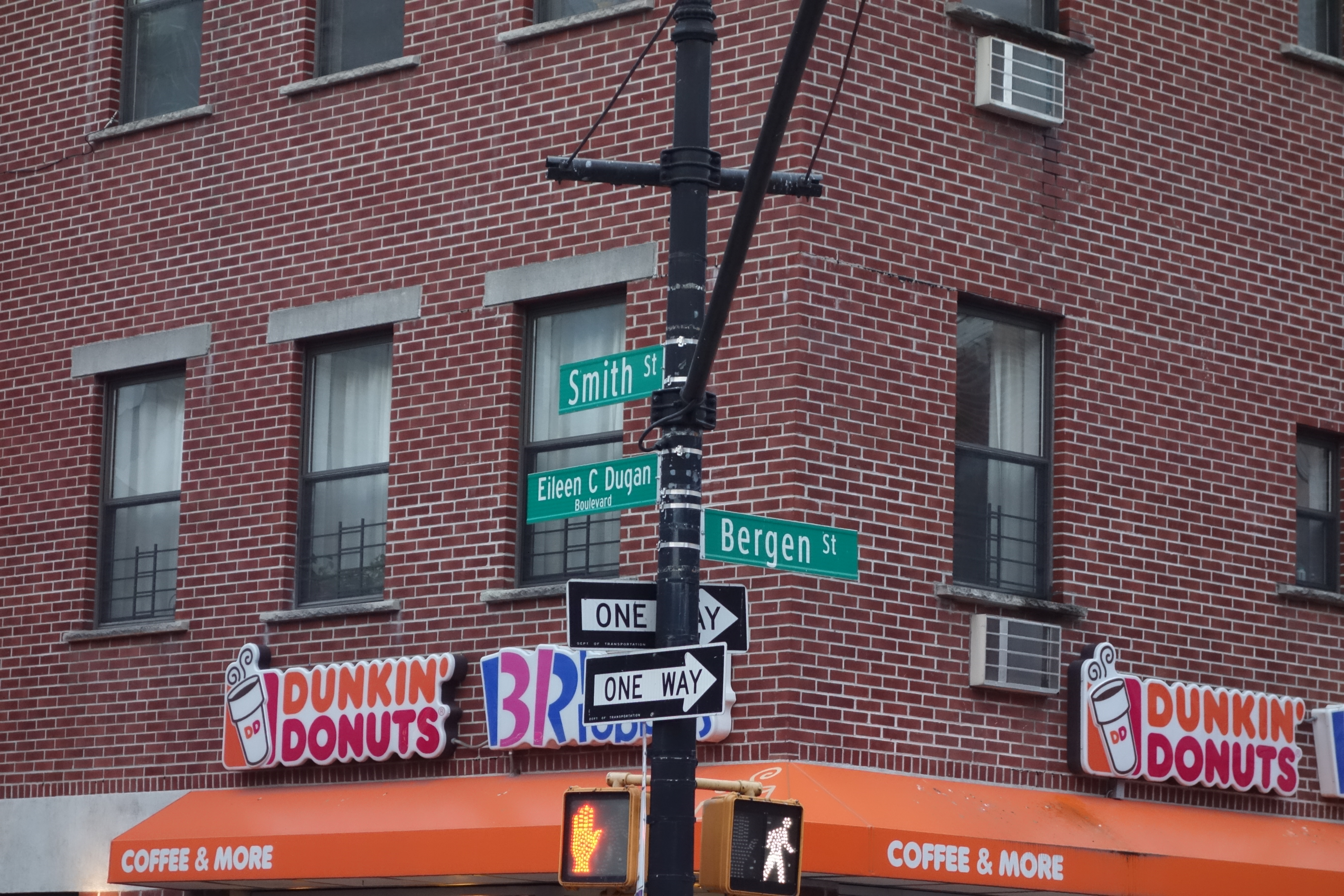
Street signs for Eileen C. Dugan Boulevard (Smith Street) in Boerum Hill, Brooklyn.

Eileen C. Dugan (April 15, 1945 – November 8, 1996) was an American politician from New York.

== Life ==
She was born on April 15, 1945, in Carroll Gardens, Brooklyn, New York City. the daughter of James Brian Dugan and Anne Dugan (Née Cunningham). She attended local schools and Grace Institute. Then she worked for the book publishing firm of James H. Oliphant & Co.

In 1974, she began to work in the office of the New York City Comptroller, and entered politics as a Democrat.

She was a member of the New York State Assembly (52nd D.) from 1981 until her death in 1996, sitting in the 184th, 185th, 186th, 187th, 188th, 189th, 190th and 191st New York State Legislatures. She was Chairwoman of the Committee on Economic Development, Job Creation and Industry.

On November 5, 1996, she was re-elected to the Assembly, but died three days later, in Beth Israel Medical Center in Manhattan, of breast cancer.

The Eileen C. Dugan Boulevard, in Brooklyn, was named in 1999 in her honor.

Annually, in April, the Eileen C. Dugan Memorial 5K street run is held in Brooklyn Bridge Park.

Joan Millman succeeded Dugan in the New York State Assembly in 1997.

New York State Assembly
Preceded by Michael L. Pesce	New York State Assembly; 52nd District; 1981–1996	Succeeded by Joan Millman
