= Gloria Davis (politician) =

American politician (born 1938)

Gloria Davis (born February 2, 1938) is a former American politician from New York.

Born in the Bronx, Davis went to Bronx Community College and Fordham University. She worked for the New York Supreme Court and the New York City Comptroller. Davis served in the New York State Assembly, as a Democrat from 1981 to 2003, sitting in the 184th, 185th, 186th, 187th, 188th, 189th, 190th, 191st, 192nd, 193rd and 194th New York State Legislatures.

She was re-elected in November 2002, but resigned her seat in the 195th New York State Legislature a few days into the session in January 2003 after pleading guilty to bribery. She was sentenced to 90 days in jail and five years probation.

== Notes ==
New York State Assembly
Preceded by Estella B. Diggs	New York State Assembly; 78th District; 1981–1992	Succeeded by Roberto Ramirez
Preceded by George Friedman	New York State Assembly; 79th District; 1993–2003	Succeeded by Michael Benjamin
