= Howard E. Babbush =

American lawyer and politician

Member of the New York State Senate
- In office April 27, 1976 – December 31, 1996
- Preceded by: A. Frederick Meyerson
- Succeeded by: John L. Sampson
- Constituency: 16th district (1976-1982); 17th district (1983-1992); 19th district (1993-1996)

Personal details
- Born: October 8, 1941 Brooklyn, New York, U.S.
- Died: January 16, 2004 (aged 62) Spain
- Party: Democratic

Howard E. Babbush (October 8, 1941 – January 16, 2004) was an American lawyer and politician from New York.

== Life ==
Babbush was born on October 8, 1941, in Brooklyn, New York City. He was Jewish. He attended Thomas Jefferson High School. He graduated B.A. from Pace University, and from St. John's University School of Law in 1966. He was admitted to the bar in 1967. He married Marilyn, and they had three children.

He entered politics as a Democrat, and became first an Assistant Corporation Counsel of New York City, then an Assistant U.S. Attorney for the Southern District of New York, and later an Assistant New York City Comptroller.

On April 27, 1976, he was elected to the New York State Assembly, to fill the vacancy caused by the appointment of A. Frederick Meyerson to the New York City Criminal Court. Babbush was re-elected several times, and remained in the Senate until 1996, sitting in the 181st, 182nd, 183rd, 184th, 185th, 186th, 187th, 188th, 189th, 190th and 191st New York State Legislatures.

On September 16, 1987, Babbush, Senate Minority Leader Manfred Ohrenstein and Ohrenstein aide Frank Sanzillo were indicted for 564 counts of grand larceny, conspiracy and several other crimes. They were accused of hiring full-time election campaign workers, in the guise of legislative aides, who were paid with money from the State Legislature. All three pleaded not guilty. Although he remained under indictment, and was re-elected several times in the meanwhile, Babbush's case never came up for trial.

In 1996, he was defeated in the Democratic primary by John L. Sampson. In November 1996, Babbush ran on the Liberal ticket for re-election, but was again defeated by Sampson.

Babbush died on January 16, 2004, while travelling in Spain.

New York State Senate
Preceded by A. Frederick Meyerson	New York State Senate; 16th District; 1976–1982	Succeeded by Jeremy S. Weinstein
Preceded by Major Owens	New York State Senate; 17th District; 1983–1992	Succeeded by Nellie R. Santiago
Preceded by Martin M. Solomon	New York State Senate; 19th District; 1993–1996	Succeeded by John L. Sampson
