= Richard J. Keane =

American politician

Richard Keane

Member of the New York State Assembly from the 145th district
- In office 1977–1998
- Preceded by: Francis J. Griffin
- Succeeded by: Brian Higgins

Personal details
- Born: March 28, 1933 Buffalo, New York, U.S.
- Died: October 21, 2008 (aged 75)
- Party: Democratic

Richard J. Keane (March 28, 1933 – October 21, 2008) was an American politician from New York

== Early life ==
Keane was born on March 28, 1933, in Buffalo, New York.

== Career ==
A Democrat, Keane served as a member of the Erie County Board of Supervisors and Erie County Legislature. He was the first Democrat ever elected chairman of the Erie County Legislature.

Keane was a member of the New York State Assembly from 1977 to 1998, sitting in the 182nd, 183rd, 184th, 185th, 186th, 187th, 188th, 189th, 190th, 191st and 192nd New York State Legislatures. Keane was also a member of the Assembly Agriculture Committee.

== Death ==
Keane died on October 21, 2008.
