= Carol A. Siwek =

American politician

Carol A. Siwek is an American politician from New York.

== Life ==
Carol A Siwek (nee Hilmey) was born December 26, 1938 in Buffalo, New York. The daughter of immigrants. Her father Ahmed "Frank" Hilmey was born in Elazig, Turkiye and died when Carol was three years old. Her mother Violet Perkins was born in Plumstead, England. After Frank's death, Violet remarried to another Turk named Bekir Alli who raised Carol and her siblings as his own.

Carol entered politics as a Republican.

In November 1980, she was elected in the 142nd District to the New York State Assembly, unseating the 22-year-incumbent Democrat Stephen R. Greco. She sat in the 184th New York State Legislature in 1981 and 1982. At the re-apportionment in 1982, the area of her residence was joined with parts of the old 144th District to form the new 144th District. In November 1982, she ran for re-election, but was defeated by Democrat William B. Hoyt, the incumbent of the old 144th District.

In September 1985, Carol Siwek ran in the Republican primary for Mayor of Buffalo, but was defeated by the incumbent Mayor James D. Griffin, a registered Democrat. Griffin lost the Democratic primary, and was re-elected on the Republican, Conservative and Right to Life tickets.

Her daughter Donna M. Siwek (born 1961) took office as a Justice of the New York Supreme Court in January 2001.

New York State Assembly
Preceded by Stephen R. Greco	New York State Assembly; 142nd District; 1981–1982	Succeeded by John B. Sheffer II
