= Mary Ellen Jones (politician) =

American politician

Mary Ellen Jones (born 1936) is an educator and politician most notable for having served as New York State Senator. She is a Democrat.

Jones graduated with a bachelor's and master's degree from the University of Rochester. She served as a first-grade teacher in the Greece, New York school district for 26 years and raised four children. Her first foray into politics was an unsuccessful run for the Irondequoit, New York town board in 1989.

She was elected Monroe County, New York legislator in 1991 and edged out a more experienced politician to become the Democratic Party candidate for the State Senate the next year. She narrowly won two terms and was a member of the State Senate from 1993 to 1996, sitting in the 190th and 191st New York State Legislatures. Early in 1996, Governor George E. Pataki appointed her to the New York State Board of Parole.

New York State Senate
Preceded by Ralph E. Quattrociocchi	New York State Senate; 55th District; 1993–1996	Succeeded by James S. Alesi
