= Seymour P. Lachman =

American politician and educator (1933–2025)

Member of the New York State Senate
- In office February 15, 1996 – December 31, 2004
- Preceded by: Martin M. Solomon
- Succeeded by: Diane Savino
- Constituency: 22nd district (1996-2002); 23rd district (2003-2004)

President of the New York City Board of Education
- In office 1973–1974

Member of the New York City Board of Education
- In office 1969–1974

Personal details
- Born: December 12, 1933 New York City, U.S.
- Died: January 2, 2025 (aged 91) New York City, U.S.
- Party: Democratic
- Spouse: Susan Altman (m. 1961)
- Children: 2
- Education: Brooklyn College (BA, MA); New York University (PhD)

Seymour P. Lachman (December 12, 1933 – January 2, 2025) was an American academic, political historian, book author, and politician from New York.

== Background ==
Lachman was born in the Bronx on December 12, 1933, to a Jewish family who immigrated from Poland. He grew up in Brooklyn, where he attended Thomas Jefferson High School and Brooklyn College, where he earned a Bachelor of Arts in 1955, and Master of Arts in 1958. He earned a Ph.D. in history from New York University in 1963.

In 1961, Lachman married Susan Altman, with whom he had two children. He died at his Manhattan residence on January 2, 2025, at the age of 91.

== Career ==
Lachman entered politics as a Democrat. He was a member of the New York City Board of Education from 1969 to 1974, and was President of the board from 1973 to 1974. He resigned from the board to spend more time teaching at City University of New York.

Lachman was a professor of History and Political Science at Kingsborough Community College of the City University of New York beginning in 1963, serving as Dean of the Mid-Brooklyn campus beginning in fall 1965.

On February 15, 1996, he was elected to the New York State Senate, to fill the vacancy caused by the election of Martin M. Solomon to the New York City Civil Court. He was re-elected four times and remained in the State Senate until 2004, sitting in the 191st, 192nd, 193rd, 194th and 195th New York State Legislatures. He was Deputy Minority Whip from 2003 to 2004. He retired from the State Senate in 2004 and was replaced by Diane Savino. With journalist Robert Polner, he co-authored the 2006 book Three Men in a Room, which said that New York state politics was effectively controlled by a triumvirate consisting of the governor, the speaker of the state assembly, and the state senate majority leader, leaving individual legislators and their constituents without power. The book spurred calls for political reform.

Afterwards he taught at Adelphi University. In 2008, upon its founding, he became the Director of the Hugh L. Carey Institute for Government Reform at Wagner College.

== Books ==
- Black/white/green/red: The Politics of Education in Ethnic America (1978) with David Bresnick and Murray Polner
- One Nation Under God: Religion in Contemporary American Society (1993) with Barry Kosmin
- Three Men in a Room: The Inside Story of Power and Betrayal in an American Statehouse (2006) with Newsday journalist Robert Polner
- The Man Who Saved New York: Hugh L. Carey and the Great Fiscal Crisis of 1975 (2011) co-authored by Robert Polner
- Mr. New York: Lew Rudin and His Love for the City (2014)
- Failed State: Dysfunction and Corruption in an American Statehouse (2017) with Newsday journalist Robert Polner

New York State Senate
Preceded by Martin M. Solomon	New York State Senate; 22nd District; 1996–2002	Succeeded by Martin Golden
Preceded by Vincent J. Gentile	New York State Senate; 23rd District; 2003–2004	Succeeded by Diane Savino
