= Naomi C. Matusow =

American politician (born 1938)

Naomi Matusow

Member of the New York State Assembly from the 89th district
- In office January 1, 1993 – December 31, 2002
- Preceded by: Peter Sullivan (redistricting)
- Succeeded by: Adam Bradley

Personal details
- Born: October 31, 1938 Nashville, Tennessee
- Party: Democratic
- Education: Vanderbilt University, B.A.; New York University, M.A.; Pace University, J.D.

Naomi C. Matusow (born October 31, 1938) is an American lawyer and politician from New York.

== Life ==
She was born on October 31, 1938, in Nashville, Tennessee. She graduated B.A. from Vanderbilt University in 1960. Then she taught mathematics at public schools in New York City. While teaching, she also attended New York University and graduated M.A. in 1966. She graduated J.D. from Pace University School of Law in 1979, was admitted to the bar in 1981, and practiced law, first in Armonk, and later in White Plains, both in Westchester County. She is Jewish.

She also entered politics as a Democrat, and was a member of the New York State Assembly (89th D.) from 1993 to 2002, sitting in the 190th, 191st, 192nd, 193rd and 194th New York State Legislatures. In September 2002, she ran for renomination but was defeated in the Democratic primary by Adam Bradley.

New York State Assembly
Preceded by Henry William Barnett	New York State Assembly; 89th District; 1993–2002	Succeeded by Adam Bradley
