= Richard A. Dollinger =

American politician (born 1951)

Richard A. Dollinger (born August 13, 1951) is an American lawyer and politician from New York.

== Life ==
Dollinger was born on August 13, 1951, in Rochester, Monroe County, New York. His family moved to Brighton when Dollinger was still in school. He attended McQuaid Jesuit High School. He graduated with a B.A. in English from St. Michael's College, Toronto, in 1973. After obtaining his degree, he worked for three years as a journalist for the Newton–Waltham News Tribune. In 1980, he graduated from Albany Law School with a J.D., and began the practice of law in Rochester.

Dollinger entered politics in 1988 as a Democrat, and was a member of the Monroe County Legislature from 1988 to 1992. He was a member of the New York State Senate (54th D.) from 1993 to 2002, sitting in the 190th, 191st, 192nd, 193rd and 194th New York State Legislatures. In July 2002, he announced that he would not seek re-election. In November 2008, he ran again for the State Senate (56th D.), but was defeated by the incumbent Republican Joseph Robach.

In 2009, Dollinger was appointed to the New York Court of Claims.

New York State Senate
Preceded by John D. Perry	New York State Senate; 54th District; 1993–2002	Succeeded by Michael F. Nozzolio
