= John G. A. O'Neil =

American politician

John G. A. O'Neil (January 12, 1937 – December 10, 1992) was an American politician from New York.

== Life ==
He was born on January 12, 1937, in Saranac Lake, New York. He attended Saranac Lake High School, and Wadhams Hall Prep Seminary in Oswegatchie. He graduated from St. Bonaventure University. He was a professor at SUNY College of Technology at Canton, and other colleges in Northern New York. In 1966, he married Chloe Ann Tehon, and they had two children. They lived in Parishville.

He entered politics as a Republican, and was a member of the New York State Assembly (112th D.) from 1981 until his death in 1992, sitting in the 184th, 185th, 186th, 187th, 188th and 189th New York State Legislatures. In November 1992, he was re-elected, but died before the next Legislature convened.

He died on December 10, 1992, in a car accident after crashing his car head-on into an oncoming vehicle on a road in St. Lawrence County. His body was taken from the accident site to the Clifton-Fine Hospital in Star Lake, but there was pronounced dead on arrival.

On February 16, 1993, his widow Chloe Ann O'Neil was elected to the Assembly, to fill the vacancy caused by his death.

On Thursday, November 15, 2018 Chloe was also killed in a car accident in the town of Dickinson, in Northern New York. She had served in her husband's former seat from 1993-1998.

New York State Assembly
Preceded by David O'Brien Martin	New York State Assembly; 112th District; 1981–1992	Succeeded by Chloe Ann O'Neil
