= Mount Saint Mary Academy (Kenmore, New York) =

- MSM

Location
- 3756 Delaware Avenue; Kenmore, (Erie County), New York 14217; United States; 42°59′14″N 78°52′29″W

Information
- Type: Private, All-Female
- Religious affiliation: Roman Catholic
- Established: 1927
- Principal: Katherine Spillman
- Faculty: 50
- Grades: 9-12
- Student to teacher ratio: 10:1
- Colors: Blue and White
- Song: The Bells of Saint Mary
- Athletics: 23 different teams
- Athletics conference: Monsignor Martin League
- Mascot: Thunder
- Nickname: Mounties
- Rival: Buffalo Academy of the Sacred Heart
- Accreditation: Middle States Association of Colleges and Schools
- Publication: The Bluelight (newspaper)
- Newspaper: Thunder Press
- Tuition: $10,990 (2017)
- Admissions Coordinator: Elizabeth Suchan '07
- Website: www.msmacademy.org

Mount Saint Mary Academy is an all-girls private, Roman Catholic high school in Kenmore, New York within the Diocese of Buffalo.

== Background ==
Mount Saint Mary Academy was established in 1927 by the Sisters of St. Mary of Namur.

Member of:

- National Catholic Education Association.
- Catholic Schools Administrators Association of New York State.
- National Association of Secondary Schools Principals.
- Bissnet.

The school has a student to faculty ratio of less than 10:1. The average SAT scores of students in the Class of 2008, all of whom take the SAT, are: Critical Reading: 560 Math: 551 Writing: 574. Their ACT Composite is 24.
