= James J. Lack =

American politician

Member of the New York State Senate for the 2nd district
- In office January 1, 1979 – December 31, 2002
- Preceded by: Bernard C. Smith
- Succeeded by: John J. Flanagan

Personal details
- Born: October 18, 1944
- Party: Republican

James J. Lack (born October 18, 1944) is an American lawyer and politician from New York.

== Life ==
He was born on October 18, 1944, the son of Eve Lack (1907–2001). He graduated B.A. from the University of Pennsylvania in 1966, and J.D. from Fordham Law School in 1969. He began to practice law in Huntington.

He entered politics as a Republican, and was Commissioner of Consumer Affairs of Suffolk County.

Lack represented the 2nd district of the New York State Senate from 1979 to 2002, sitting in the 183rd, 184th, 185th, 186th, 187th, 188th, 189th, 190th, 191st, 192nd, 193rd and 194th New York State Legislatures.

On December 17, 2002, he was appointed as a justice of the New York Court of Claims. He resigned from the bench on January 31, 2011.

He lives in East Northport.

New York State Senate
Preceded by Bernard C. Smith	New York State Senate; 2nd District; 1979–2002	Succeeded by John J. Flanagan
