= Ray T. Chesbro =

American politician

Member of the New York State Assembly from the 117th district
- In office January 1, 1981 – December 31, 1990
- Preceded by: John R. Zagame
- Succeeded by: Frances T. Sullivan

Personal details
- Born: 1925 Pennellville, New York, U.S.
- Died: March 3, 2017 (aged 91–92) Phoenix, New York, U.S.
- Party: Republican

Ray T. Chesbro (1925 – March 3, 2017) was an American politician who served in the New York State Assembly from the 117th district from 1981 to 1990.

He died on March 3, 2017, in Phoenix, New York at age 91.
