= Glenn E. Warren =

American politician

Member of the New York State Assembly from the 99th district
- In office January 1, 1983 – December 31, 1994
- Preceded by: Stephen M. Saland
- Succeeded by: Patrick R. Manning

Member of the New York State Assembly from the 100th district
- In office January 1, 1977 – December 31, 1982
- Preceded by: Benjamin P. Roosa Jr.
- Succeeded by: Neil W. Kelleher

Personal details
- Born: July 26, 1943 (age 82) Fishkill, New York
- Party: Republican

Glenn E. Warren (born July 26, 1943) is an American politician who served in the New York State Assembly from 1977 to 1994. He was the Republican nominee for Dutchess County Executive in 1979, losing to incumbent Lucille P. Pattison. He sought the party's nomination for Congress in New York's 19th District in 1994, but placed third in the primary election behind Sue Kelly and Joe DioGuardi.
