= Roberto Ramirez (politician) =

American politician

Member of the New York State Assembly from the 78th district
- In office 1993–2000
- Preceded by: Gloria Davis
- Succeeded by: Jose Rivera

Member of the New York State Assembly from the 77th district
- In office 1991–1992
- Preceded by: Israel Martinez
- Succeeded by: Aurelia Greene

Personal details
- Born: May 5, 1950 (age 76) Puerto Rico
- Party: Democrat
- Children: 2
- Education: Bronx Community College (AS); New York University; New York University School of Law (JD)
- Occupation: lawyer, politician
- Profession: lawyer

Roberto Ramirez (born April 5, 1950) is a licensed attorney and graduate of New York University School of Law. He is currently a business and political strategist at the MirRam Group LLC, a consulting firm that he co-founded. Ramirez served as a New York State Assemblyman for five terms representing the 78th Assembly District in The Bronx from 1990 to 2000. He was elected Chairman of the Bronx Democratic County Committee 1996, becoming the nation's first county leader of Puerto Rican heritage, and served as a member of the Democratic National Committee.

== Early life, education, and career ==
Born in Puerto Rico in 1950, Mr. Ramirez received his associate degree in Computer Science from Bronx Community College and his Bachelor of Science Degree in Public Administration from New York University. Ramirez was awarded his law degree from New York University School of Law in 1993 and was admitted to the bar in 1997. Mr. Ramirez served as Of Counsel to the national labor law firm of Whatley, Drake & Kallas, LLC. and from 1998–1999 served as Of Counsel to McConnell Valdes LLC, offering services in areas of corporate and commercial practice. During this time, Mr. Ramirez also founded and served as a partner of the law firm of Oquendo, Ramirez, Zayas, Torres and Martinez LLP in the Bronx.

As an attorney, and both before and during his time in public office, Mr. Ramirez worked as an activist in the crusade against social injustice and racism. Along with other New York leaders he led the protests to halt the U.S. bombing of the Puerto Rican Island of Vieques, spending 40 days in a Federal Penitentiary for his act of civil disobedience to stop the bombings. Mr. Ramirez also subjected himself to arrest in demonstrations in the wake of the shooting of Amadou Diallo. In 1996, Ramirez was elected Chairman of the Bronx Democratic County Committee becoming the nation's first county leader of Puerto Rican heritage, and a member of the Democratic National Committee. In 1998, The New York Post recognized Ramirez as one of the "50 Most Powerful People in New York City". He was listed in New York Daily News as one of "50 New Yorkers to Watch in 1999". In 2003 and 2005, the Post named him one of "New York State's 25 Most Influential Latinos". Mr. Ramirez is credited with being the architect behind Fernando Ferrer's 2001 and 2005 mayoralty campaigns. Additionally, Ramirez has served as a political strategist and consultant for the campaigns of candidates such as William Thompson for Mayor and Carl H. McCall for Governor as well as the campaigns of statewide candidates such as Senators Hillary Clinton and Chuck Schumer.

== New York State Assembly ==
From 1990 to 2000 Ramirez served as a New York State Assemblyman representing the 78th Assembly District in The Bronx. During his tenure as a legislator, Ramirez chaired several committees including the Subcommittee on Urban Health Care, the Administrative Regulations Review Commission (ARRC), the Social Services and the Real Property Tax Committee.

As Chair of the Subcommittee on Urban Health Care, Ramirez conducted groundbreaking hearings on the issue of discrimination in New York's health care system.

As Chair of the Administrative Regulations Review Commission (ARRC), Mr. Ramirez introduced regulatory reform legislation and conducted statewide public hearings on health and environmental issues and on the Executive Branch's attempts to restrict the right of the public to participate in the State rule-making process.

As Chair of the Social Services Committee, Ramirez worked to protect the interests of New Yorkers participating in government assistance programs. Ramirez authored the Ramirez/March bill which was eventually adopted as budget language requiring welfare-to-work programs to provide welfare recipients enrolled in colleges with workfare assignments on or near their campuses.

As the Chairman of the Real Property Tax Committee, Ramirez chaired an 11-member Task Force on the School Tax Relief (STAR) Program, resulting in the passage of nine bills aimed at expanding eligibility of the Program to primary homeowners.

Mr. Ramirez also introduced educational legislation to provide additional resources to Schools Under Registration Review (SURR). Ramirez, with the vision of creating hundreds of permanent private sector jobs, authored legislation creating five county-specific Industrial Development Agencies as well as the Bronx Development Corporation.

In 1998, Chief Judge Judith Kaye and Chief Administrative Judge Jonathan Lippman appointed Ramirez to the Committee to Promote Public Trust and Confidence in the Legal System to address public trust issues and develop a strategic plan to improve the justice system.

== Personal life ==
Ramirez resides in New York. He has a son, Roberto Jr. and a daughter, Angelisa. He also has six grandchildren.

Political offices
Preceded by Israel Martinez	New York State Assembly; 77th District; 1991–1992	Succeeded by Aurelia Greene
Preceded by Gloria Davis	New York State Assembly; 78th District; 1993–2000	Succeeded by José Rivera
Party political offices
Preceded by George Friedman	Chairman of the Executive Committee of the Bronx County Democratic Committee; 1996 - 2002	Succeeded by José Rivera
