= Harold C. Brown Jr. =

Harold C. Brown Jr. (February 10, 1932 - November 2, 2022) was an American politician who served in the New York State Assembly from 1989 to 2002, representing New York's 121st State Assembly district.

Brown graduated from Syracuse University in 1953 before owning an office supply company in Syracuse. Brown, a Republican, unsuccessfully ran for a spot on the Onondaga County Legislature in 1973, losing to Democrat Elaine Lytel. He defeated Lytel in a rematch in 1979 and served on the county legislature until 1988.

He was elected to the State Assembly in 1989, where he served on the Ways and Means and Health and Public Safety committees.

Brown died on November 2, 2022.

New York State Assembly
Preceded by Hyman M. Miller	New York State Assembly; 121st District; 1989-2002	Succeeded by Jeffrey Brown
