= Francis J. Pordum =

American politician

Francis J. Pordum (born December 4, 1945) is an American politician from Lake View, New York. A member of the Democratic Party, he served as a New York State Assemblyman and represented the 1st District in the Erie County Legislature from 1980 to 1982.

Pordum was born in Lackawanna, New York, and graduated in 1968 from Colgate University with a BA in Geology and with an MS in Education from the University at Buffalo in 1973. He worked as a teacher and coach for Lackawanna Public Schools from 1973 to 1980.

Pordum represented District 136 in the New York State Assembly from 1983 to 1996. While serving in the assembly, introduced legislation prohibiting the use of lawn pesticides in rain or high winds, and forcing lawn-care companies to post signs on properties where pesticides have been applied.

In 1996, Pordum lost against incumbent Jack Quinn for the US House of Representative District 30 seat. In 2004, he ran against Quinn's son, Jack Quinn III, for his old assembly seat and lost, as well.

Pordum also served as the Town Supervisor of Evans, New York.

New York State Assembly, 146th District Election, November 2, 2004
| Party | Candidate | Votes | % | ±% |
|---|---|---|---|---|
| Democratic | Francis J. Pordum | 21,601 | 35.99 | −16.65 |
| Republican | Jack Quinn, III | 31,595 | 52.64 | 0 |
| Independence | Patrick Hoak | 6,828 | 11.38 | −41.26 |

Political offices
| Preceded by Marie Gannon | 1st District Erie County Legislator; 1980-1982 | Succeeded by Edward J. Kuwik |
| Preceded by | New York State Assembly, District 136; 1983-1996 | Succeeded by |
