= John Brian Murtaugh =

American politician

Member of the New York State Assembly
- In office January 1, 1981 – December 31, 1996
- Preceded by: Edward H. Lehner
- Succeeded by: Adriano Espaillat
- Constituency: 73rd district (1981–1982); 72nd district (1983–1996)

Personal details
- Born: May 6, 1937 Wahiawa, Hawaii
- Died: December 10, 2017 (aged 80) Brooklyn, New York City, New York
- Party: Democratic

John Brian Murtaugh (May 6, 1937 – December 10, 2017) was an American politician who served in the New York State Assembly from 1981 to 1996.

He died on December 10, 2017, in Brooklyn, New York City, New York at age 80.
