= Anthony J. Casale =

American politician (born 1947)

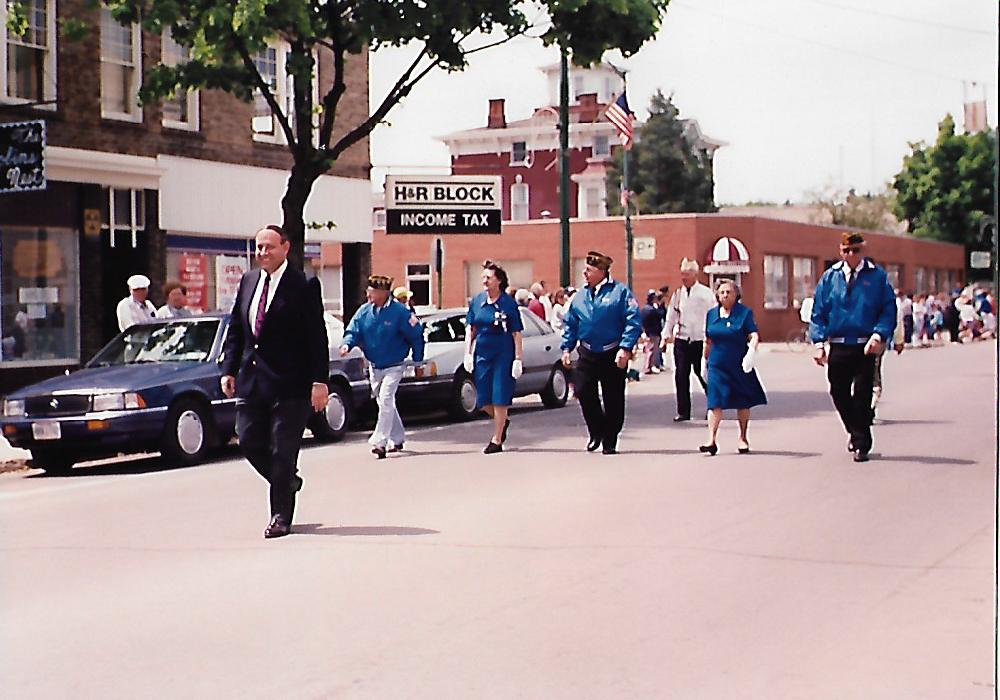
- Anthony Casale walks in a parade in Herkimer, New York

Member of the New York State Assembly from the 113th district
- In office January 1, 1979 – July 17, 1995
- Preceded by: Peter S. Dokuchitz
- Succeeded by: Marc W. Butler

Personal details
- Born: October 7, 1947 (age 78) Herkimer, New York
- Party: Republican

Anthony J. Casale (born October 7, 1947) is an American politician who served in the New York State Assembly from the 113th district from 1979 to 1995.
