= Denis J. Butler =

American politician

Member of the New York State Assembly for the 36th district
- In office 1976–2000
- Preceded by: Anthony V. Gazzara
- Succeeded by: Michael Gianaris

Personal details
- Born: 1926
- Died: 2010 (aged 83–84)
- Party: Democratic

Denis J. Butler (1926–2010) was a New York Assemblyman from Queens, New York, who represented the 36th legislative district for a quarter century from 1976 to 2000. At the time, the district encompassed the Astoria neighborhood of Queens. Eight years after Butler's death in 2010, a street in Astoria was named after him to commemorate him and preserve his legacy.

In the Assembly, he was preceded by Anthony V. Gazzara who served from 1974 to 1976. Both Butler and Gazzara served as Democrats. He first served in the 181st New York State Legislature and ended in the 193rd.
