= Joseph T. Pillittere =

American politician

Member of the New York State Assembly from the 138th district
- In office January 1, 1979 – December 31, 1998
- Preceded by: John B. Daly
- Succeeded by: Robert A. Daly

Personal details
- Born: June 26, 1932 Buffalo, New York
- Died: June 24, 2016 (aged 83) North Tonawanda, New York
- Party: Democratic

Joseph T. Pillittere (June 26, 1932 – June 24, 2016) was an American politician who served in the New York State Assembly from the 138th district from 1979 to 1998.

He died on June 24, 2016, in North Tonawanda, New York at age 83.
