= H. Robert Nortz =

American politician

Member of the New York State Assembly from the 114th district
- In office January 1, 1977 – December 31, 2002
- Preceded by: Donald L. Taylor
- Succeeded by: Chris Ortloff

Personal details
- Born: January 25, 1932 Lowville, New York
- Died: December 4, 2008 (aged 76) Sarasota, Florida
- Party: Republican

H. Robert Nortz (January 25, 1932 – December 4, 2008) was an American politician who served in the New York State Assembly from the 114th district from 1977 to 2002.

He died of liver cancer on December 4, 2008, in Sarasota, Florida at age 76.
