= Robert A. D'Andrea =

American politician (1932/1933–2025)

Member of the New York State Assembly for the 100th district
- In office 1975–2003
- Succeeded by: Roy J. McDonald

Personal details
- Born: 1932 or 1933 New Jersey, U.S.
- Died: March 21, 2025 (aged 92)
- Party: Republican

Robert "Bob" Anthony D'Andrea (1932 or 1933 – March 21, 2025) was an American politician. He died from cardiac amyloidosis on March 21, 2025, at the age of 92.
