= 186th New York State Legislature =

New York state legislative session

| ← | 185th | 187th | → |
- New York State Capitol (2009)

Overview
- Legislative body: New York State Legislature
- Jurisdiction: New York, United States
- Term: January 1, 1985 – December 31, 1986

Senate
- Members: 61
- President: Lt. Gov. Alfred DelBello (D), until February 1, 1985
- Temporary President: Warren M. Anderson (R)
- Party control: Republican (35–26)

Assembly
- Members: 150
- Speaker: Stanley Fink (D)
- Party control: Democratic (94–56)

Sessions
- 1st: January 9 – June 30, 1985
- 2nd: December 10, 1985 –
- 3rd: January 8 – July 3, 1986
- 4th: December 11 – 30, 1986

The 186th New York State Legislature, consisting of the New York State Senate and the New York State Assembly, met from January 9, 1985, to December 31, 1986, during the third and fourth years of Mario Cuomo's governorship, in Albany.

== Background ==
Under the provisions of the New York Constitution of 1938 and the U.S. Supreme Court decision to follow the One man, one vote rule, re-apportioned in 1982 by the Legislature, 61 Senators and 150 assemblymen were elected in single-seat districts for two-year terms. Senate and Assembly districts consisted of approximately the same number of inhabitants, the area being apportioned contiguously without restrictions regarding county boundaries.

At this time there were two major political parties: the Democratic Party and the Republican Party. The Conservative Party, the Liberal Party, the Right to Life Party, the Libertarian Party, the Communist Party, the New Alliance Party and the Workers World Party also nominated tickets.

== Elections ==
The 1984 New York state election, was held on November 6. No statewide elective offices were up for election. The approximate party strength at this election, as expressed by the vote for U.S. president, was: Republicans 3,377,000; Democrats 3,120,000; Conservatives 288,000; Liberals 118,000; Libertarians 12,000; Communists 4,000; New Alliance 3,000; and Workers World 2,000.

Twenty of the 23 women members of the previous legislature—State Senators Mary B. Goodhue (Rep.), a lawyer of Mount Kisco; and Olga A. Méndez (Dem.), of East Harlem; and Assemblywomen Elizabeth Connelly (Dem.), of Staten Island; Pinny Cooke (Rep.), of Rochester; Geraldine L. Daniels (Dem.), of the Bronx; Gloria Davis (Dem.), of the Bronx; Eileen C. Dugan (Dem.), of Brooklyn; Aurelia Greene (Dem.), of the Bronx; Julia Harrison (Dem.), of Queens; Rhoda S. Jacobs (Dem.), of Brooklyn; Cynthia Jenkins (Dem.), a librarian of Queens; Gerdi E. Lipschutz (Dem.), of Queens; Helen M. Marshall (Dem.), a teacher and librarian of Queens; Nettie Mayersohn (Dem.), of Queens; Mary M. McPhillips (Dem.), of Middletown; May W. Newburger (Dem.), of Great Neck; Barbara Patton (Dem.), a lawyer of Hempstead; Toni Rettaliata (Rep.), of Huntington; Louise M. Slaughter (Dem.), of Fairport; and Helene Weinstein (Dem.), a lawyer of Brooklyn—were re-elected. Nancy Larraine Hoffmann (Dem.), of Syracuse; Velmanette Montgomery (Dem.), of Brooklyn; and Suzi Oppenheimer (Dem.), of Mamaroneck; were also elected to the State Senate. Catherine Nolan (Dem.), of Queens, was also elected to the Assembly. Thus the 186th Legislature began having 24 women members, surpassing the previous record of 23 in the 185th New York State Legislature (1983–1984).

The 1985 New York state election was held on November 5. One vacancy in the State Senate was filled.

== Sessions ==
The Legislature met for the first regular session (the 208th) at the State Capitol in Albany on January 9, 1985; and recessed indefinitely on June 30.

Stanley Fink (Dem.) was re-elected Speaker of the Assembly.

Warren M. Anderson (Rep.) was re-elected Temporary President of the Senate. On February 1, 1985, Lt. Gov. DelBello resigned, and Anderson acted as lieutenant governor until the end of 1986.

The Legislature met for a special session on December 10, 1985. This session was called by Governor Cuomo to consider legislation concerning malpractice insurance rates; the sale of all State holdings in companies which do business in South Africa; the time limit for suits in cases of harm by toxic substances; hostile corporate takeovers; low-income housing in New York City; and municipal liability insurance rates.

The Legislature met for the second regular session (the 209th) at the State Capitol in Albany on January 8, 1986; and recessed indefinitely on July 3.

The Legislature met for another special session from December 11 to 30, 1986. This session was called by Governor Cuomo to consider legislation concerning the creation of 23 judgeships in New York City; the financing of the mass transit system in New York City; a revision of the State's tax system; and subsidies for elderly people to buy prescription drugs.

== State Senate ==
=== Senators ===
The asterisk (*) denotes members of the previous Legislature who continued in office as members of this Legislature. Eugene Levy changed from the Assembly to the Senate.

Note: For brevity, the chairmanships omit the words "...the Committee on (the)..."

| District | Senator | Party | Notes |
|---|---|---|---|
| 1st | Kenneth LaValle* | Rep./Cons. | |
| 2nd | James J. Lack* | Rep./Cons. | |
| 3rd | Caesar Trunzo* | Rep./Cons./RTL | |
| 4th | Owen H. Johnson* | Rep./Cons./RTL | |
| 5th | Ralph J. Marino* | Rep./Cons. | Chairman of Banks; Chairman of the Majority Program Committee |
| 6th | John R. Dunne* | Rep./Cons. | Chairman of Judiciary |
| 7th | Michael J. Tully Jr.* | Rep./Cons. | |
| 8th | Norman J. Levy* | Rep./Cons. | Chairman of Transportation |
| 9th | Dean Skelos | Rep./Cons. | |
| 10th | Andrew Jenkins* | Dem./Lib. | |
| 11th | Frank Padavan* | Rep./Cons./RTL | |
| 12th | Leonard P. Stavisky* | Dem./Lib. | |
| 13th | Emanuel R. Gold* | Dem./Lib. | |
| 14th | George Onorato* | Democrat | |
| 15th | Martin J. Knorr* | Rep./Cons./RTL | Assistant Majority Whip |
| 16th | Jeremy S. Weinstein* | Dem./Lib. | |
| 17th | Howard E. Babbush* | Dem./Lib. | |
| 18th | Donald Halperin* | Democrat | |
| 19th | Martin M. Solomon* | Democrat | |
| 20th | Thomas J. Bartosiewicz* | Democrat | |
| 21st | Marty Markowitz* | Democrat | |
| 22nd | Velmanette Montgomery | Democrat | |
| 23rd | Christopher J. Mega | Rep./Cons./RTL | |
| 24th | John J. Marchi* | Rep./Dem./Cons. | Chairman of Finance |
| 25th | Martin Connor* | Dem./Lib. | |
| 26th | Roy M. Goodman* | Rep./Lib. | |
| 27th | Manfred Ohrenstein* | Dem./Lib. | Minority Leader |
| 28th | Franz S. Leichter* | Dem./Lib. | |
| 29th | Leon Bogues* | Dem./Lib. | died on August 6, 1985 |
| 29th | David Paterson | Democrat | on November 5, 1985, elected to fill vacancy |
| 30th | Olga A. Méndez* | Democrat | |
| 31st | Joseph L. Galiber* | Dem./Lib. | |
| 32nd | Israel Ruiz Jr.* | Dem./Lib. | |
| 33rd | Abraham Bernstein* | Dem./Rep./Lib. | |
| 34th | John D. Calandra* | Rep./Cons. | Majority Whip; died on January 20, 1986 |
| 34th | Guy J. Velella | Republican | on April 22, 1986, elected to fill vacancy |
| 35th | John E. Flynn* | Rep./Cons. | |
| 36th | Suzi Oppenheimer | Dem./Lib. | |
| 37th | Mary B. Goodhue* | Rep./Cons. | |
| 38th | Eugene Levy* | Rep./Cons. | |
| 39th | Richard E. Schermerhorn* | Republican | |
| 40th | Charles D. Cook* | Rep./Cons. | |
| 41st | Jay P. Rolison Jr.* | Rep./Cons. | Assistant Majority Leader |
| 42nd | Howard C. Nolan Jr.* | Dem./Lib. | |
| 43rd | Joseph Bruno* | Rep./Cons. | |
| 44th | Hugh T. Farley* | Rep./Cons./RTL | Chairman of Environmental Conservation |
| 45th | Ronald B. Stafford* | Rep./Cons. | |
| 46th | John M. McHugh | Rep./Cons. | |
| 47th | James H. Donovan* | Rep./Cons. | Chairman of Education |
| 48th | Nancy Larraine Hoffmann | Democrat | |
| 49th | Tarky Lombardi Jr.* | Rep./Cons. | |
| 50th | Lloyd Stephen Riford Jr.* | Republican | Chairman of Agriculture |
| 51st | Warren M. Anderson* | Rep./Cons. | re-elected Temporary President |
| 52nd | William T. Smith* | Rep./Cons. | Deputy Majority Leader |
| 53rd | L. Paul Kehoe* | Rep./Cons. | |
| 54th | John D. Perry* | Democrat | |
| 55th | Ralph E. Quattrociocchi | Dem./Cons. | |
| 56th | Jess J. Present* | Republican | |
| 57th | William Stachowski* | Dem./Cons. | |
| 58th | Anthony M. Masiello* | Dem./Lib. | |
| 59th | Dale M. Volker* | Rep./Cons. | |
| 60th | Walter J. Floss Jr.* | Rep./Cons. | |
| 61st | John B. Daly* | Rep./Cons. | |

=== Employees ===
- Secretary: Stephen F. Sloan

== State Assembly ==
=== Assembly members ===
The asterisk (*) denotes members of the previous Legislature who continued in office as members of this Legislature.

Note: For brevity, the chairmanships omit the words "...the Committee on (the)..."

| District | Assembly member | Party | Notes |
|---|---|---|---|
| 1st | Joseph Sawicki Jr.* | Rep./Cons. | |
| 2nd | John L. Behan* | Rep./Cons. | |
| 3rd | Icilio W. Bianchi Jr.* | Democrat | |
| 4th | Robert J. Gaffney | Rep./Cons./RTL | |
| 5th | Paul E. Harenberg* | Democrat | |
| 6th | Robert C. Wertz* | Rep./Cons./RTL | |
| 7th | Thomas F. Barraga* | Rep./Cons./RTL | |
| 8th | John C. Cochrane* | Rep./Cons. | |
| 9th | John J. Flanagan* | Rep./Cons./RTL | |
| 10th | Toni Rettaliata* | Rep./Cons. | |
| 11th | Patrick G. Halpin* | Democrat | |
| 12th | Philip B. Healey* | Rep./Cons. | |
| 13th | Lewis J. Yevoli* | Democrat | |
| 14th | Frederick E. Parola* | Rep./Cons. | |
| 15th | Daniel Frisa | Rep./Cons. | |
| 16th | May W. Newburger* | Dem./Lib. | |
| 17th | Kemp Hannon* | Rep./Cons. | |
| 18th | Barbara Patton* | Dem./Lib. | |
| 19th | Armand P. D'Amato* | Rep./Cons. | |
| 20th | Arthur J. Kremer* | Dem./Lib. | Chairman of Ways and Means |
| 21st | Gregory R. Becker* | Rep./Cons. | |
| 22nd | George H. Madison* | Rep./Cons. | |
| 23rd | Gerdi E. Lipschutz* | Dem./Lib. | |
| 24th | Saul Weprin* | Dem./Lib. | Chairman of Judiciary |
| 25th | Douglas Prescott | Rep./Cons./RTL | |
| 26th | Julia Harrison* | Dem./Lib. | on November 5, 1985, elected to the New York City Council |
| 26th | David M. Kramer | Democrat | on February 18, 1986, elected to fill vacancy |
| 27th | Nettie Mayersohn* | Dem./Lib. | |
| 28th | Alan G. Hevesi* | Dem./Lib. | |
| 29th | Cynthia Jenkins* | Dem./Lib. | |
| 30th | Ralph Goldstein* | Dem./Lib. | |
| 31st | Anthony S. Seminerio* | Dem./Cons. | |
| 32nd | Edward Abramson* | Democrat | |
| 33rd | Alton R. Waldon Jr.* | Dem./Lib. | on June 10, 1986, elected to the 99th U.S. Congress |
| 34th | Ivan C. Lafayette* | Dem./Lib. | |
| 35th | Helen M. Marshall* | Dem./Lib. | |
| 36th | Denis J. Butler* | Democrat | |
| 37th | Catherine Nolan | Democrat | |
| 38th | Frederick D. Schmidt* | Dem./RTL | |
| 39th | Stanley Fink* | Dem./Lib. | re-elected Speaker |
| 40th | Edward Griffith* | Dem./Lib. | |
| 41st | Helene Weinstein* | Democrat | |
| 42nd | Rhoda S. Jacobs* | Dem./Lib. | |
| 43rd | Clarence Norman Jr.* | Democrat | |
| 44th | Mel Miller* | Dem./Lib. | Chairman of Codes |
| 45th | Daniel L. Feldman* | Democrat | |
| 46th | Howard L. Lasher* | Dem./Lib. | |
| 47th | Frank J. Barbaro* | Democrat | |
| 48th | Dov Hikind* | Democrat | |
| 49th | Arnaldo Ferraro | Rep./Cons./RTL | |
| 50th | Joseph R. Lentol* | Democrat | |
| 51st | James F. Brennan | Democrat | |
| 52nd | Eileen C. Dugan* | Dem./Lib. | |
| 53rd | Vito J. Lopez | Democrat | |
| 54th | Thomas F. Catapano* | Dem./Lib. | |
| 55th | William F. Boyland* | Dem./Lib. | |
| 56th | Albert Vann* | Democrat | |
| 57th | Roger L. Green* | Democrat | |
| 58th | Elizabeth Connelly* | Democrat | |
| 59th | Eric N. Vitaliano* | Dem./Cons. | |
| 60th | Robert A. Straniere* | Rep./Cons./RTL | |
| 61st | William F. Passannante* | Dem./Lib. | |
| 62nd | Sheldon Silver* | Dem./Lib. | |
| 63rd | Steven Sanders* | Dem./Lib. | |
| 64th | Richard N. Gottfried* | Dem./Lib. | |
| 65th | Alexander B. Grannis* | Dem./Lib. | |
| 66th | Mark Alan Siegel* | Dem./Lib. | |
| 67th | Jerrold Nadler* | Dem./Lib. | |
| 68th | Angelo Del Toro* | Dem./Lib. | |
| 69th | Edward C. Sullivan* | Dem./Lib. | |
| 70th | Geraldine L. Daniels* | Dem./Lib. | |
| 71st | Herman D. Farrell Jr.* | Democrat | |
| 72nd | John Brian Murtaugh* | Dem./Lib. | |
| 73rd | José E. Serrano* | Dem./Lib. | |
| 74th | Hector L. Diaz* | Democrat | |
| 75th | John C. Dearie* | Dem./Lib. | |
| 76th | Aurelia Greene* | Democrat | |
| 77th | Jose Rivera* | Dem./Lib. | |
| 78th | Gloria Davis* | Dem./Lib. | |
| 79th | George Friedman* | Dem./Lib. | |
| 80th | G. Oliver Koppell* | Dem./Lib. | |
| 81st | Eliot Engel* | Dem./Lib. | |
| 82nd | Larry Seabrook | Democrat | |
| 83rd | Nicholas A. Spano* | Rep./Cons. | |
| 84th | Gordon W. Burrows* | Republican | |
| 85th | Ronald C. Tocci | Democrat | |
| 86th | Richard L. Brodsky* | Dem./Lib. | |
| 87th | Peter M. Sullivan* | Rep./Cons. | |
| 88th | Gregory P. Young* | Democrat | |
| 89th | Henry William Barnett* | Rep./Cons. | |
| 90th | Vincent Leibell* | Rep./Cons. | |
| 91st | George E. Pataki | Rep./Cons. | |
| 92nd | Robert J. Connor* | Dem./Lib. | |
| 93rd | Samuel Colman | Dem./Lib. | |
| 94th | Mary M. McPhillips* | Democrat | |
| 95th | William J. Larkin Jr.* | Rep./Cons. | |
| 96th | Lawrence E. Bennett* | Democrat | |
| 97th | Stephen M. Saland* | Rep./Cons. | |
| 98th | Richard I. Coombe* | Rep./Cons. | |
| 99th | Glenn E. Warren* | Rep./Cons. | |
| 100th | Neil W. Kelleher* | Rep./Cons./RTL | |
| 101st | Maurice D. Hinchey* | Dem./Lib. | |
| 102nd | Clarence D. Lane* | Rep./Cons. | |
| 103rd | Arnold W. Proskin | Rep./Cons. | |
| 104th | Richard J. Conners* | Dem./Lib. | |
| 105th | Paul D. Tonko* | Dem./Lib. | |
| 106th | Michael R. McNulty* | Dem./Lib. | |
| 107th | James Tedisco* | Rep./Cons. | |
| 108th | Robert A. D'Andrea* | Rep./Cons. | |
| 109th | Glenn H. Harris* | Rep./Cons. | |
| 110th | Andrew W. Ryan Jr.* | Rep./Cons. | on November 5, 1985, elected D.A. of Clinton County |
| 110th | Chris Ortloff | Republican | on February 18, 1986, elected to fill vacancy |
| 111th | John W. McCann* | Rep./Cons. | |
| 112th | John G. A. O'Neil* | Republican | |
| 113th | Anthony J. Casale* | Rep./Cons. | |
| 114th | H. Robert Nortz* | Rep./Cons. | |
| 115th | William R. Sears* | Rep./Cons. | |
| 116th | Richard S. Ruggiero* | Democrat | on March 21, 1986, pleaded guilty to attempted sexual abuse |
| 117th | Ray T. Chesbro* | Rep./Cons. | |
| 118th | Michael J. Bragman* | Dem./Cons. | |
| 119th | William E. Bush* | Rep./Cons. | |
| 120th | Melvin N. Zimmer* | Dem./Cons. | |
| 121st | Hyman M. Miller* | Rep./Cons. | |
| 122nd | Clarence D. Rappleyea Jr.* | Rep./Cons. | Minority Leader |
| 123rd | Richard H. Miller | Rep./Cons. | |
| 124th | James R. Tallon Jr.* | Democrat | |
| 125th | Hugh S. MacNeil* | Republican | |
| 126th | George H. Winner Jr.* | Rep./Cons. | |
| 127th | Randy Kuhl* | Rep./Cons. | |
| 128th | Michael F. Nozzolio* | Rep./Cons. | |
| 129th | Frank G. Talomie Sr.* | Rep./Cons. | |
| 130th | Louise M. Slaughter* | Democrat | on November 4, 1986, elected to the 100th U.S. Congress |
| 131st | Gary Proud* | Dem./Lib. | |
| 132nd | Pinny Cooke* | Rep./Cons. | |
| 133rd | David F. Gantt* | Dem./Lib. | |
| 134th | Roger J. Robach* | Dem./Cons. | |
| 135th | James F. Nagle* | Rep./Cons. | |
| 136th | Richard C. Wesley* | Republican | on November 4, 1986, elected to the New York Supreme Court |
| 137th | R. Stephen Hawley* | Rep./Cons. | |
| 138th | Joseph T. Pillittere* | Dem./Lib. | |
| 139th | Matthew J. Murphy Jr.* | Dem./Cons. | |
| 140th | Robin L. Schimminger* | Democrat | |
| 141st | Arthur O. Eve* | Dem./Lib. | |
| 142nd | John B. Sheffer II* | Rep./Cons. | |
| 143rd | Dennis T. Gorski* | Dem./Cons. | |
| 144th | William B. Hoyt* | Dem./Lib. | |
| 145th | Richard J. Keane* | Dem./Cons./RTL | |
| 146th | Francis J. Pordum* | Dem./Cons./RTL | |
| 147th | L. William Paxon* | Rep./Cons. | |
| 148th | Vincent J. Graber Sr.* | Dem./Cons. | |
| 149th | Daniel B. Walsh* | Democrat | Majority Leader |
| 150th | William L. Parment* | Dem./Lib. | |

=== Employees ===
- Clerk: Francine Misasi

== Sources ==
- THE RESULTS OF THE BALLOTING FOR NEW YORK STATE SENATE in The New York Times on November 8, 1984
- MEMBERS OF NEW YORK STATE ASSEMBLY AND VOTES THEY RECEIVED in The New York Times on November 8, 1984
- G.O.P. SENATORS FROM NEW YORK CITY AND L.I. GET NEW POWER in The New York Times on January 10, 1985
