= 185th New York State Legislature =

New York state legislative session

←	184th	186th	→
- New York State Capitol (2009)

Overview
- Legislative body: New York State Legislature
- Jurisdiction: New York, United States
- Term: January 1, 1983 – December 31, 1984

Senate
- Members: 61
- President: Lt. Gov. Alfred DelBello (D)
- Temporary President: Warren M. Anderson (R)
- Party control: Republican (35–26)

Assembly
- Members: 150
- Speaker: Stanley Fink (D)
- Party control: Democratic (98–52)

Sessions
- 1st: January 5 – June 28, 1983
- 2nd: September 15, 1983 –
- 3rd: January 4 – July 1, 1984
- 4th: December 6, 1984 –

The 185th New York State Legislature, consisting of the New York State Senate and the New York State Assembly, met from January 5, 1983, to December 31, 1984, during the first and second years of Mario Cuomo's governorship, in Albany.

== Background ==
On May 8, 1982, Senate Republicans and Assembly Democrats announced that they had agreed upon a new apportionment. The number of seats in the State Senate was increased from 60 to 61. The new district lines were gerrymandered by the Republican Senate majority to increase Republican strength, and by the Democratic Assembly majority to increase Democratic strength.

On June 23, 1982, a special panel of three federal judges ordered Special Master Robert P. Patterson Jr. to revise the new apportionment proposed by the Legislature.

On July 3, 1982, the revised re-apportionment was approved by the U.S. Department of Justice.

Thus, under the provisions of the New York Constitution of 1938 and the U.S. Supreme Court decision to follow the One man, one vote rule, re-apportioned in 1982 by the Legislature, 61 Senators and 150 assemblymen were elected in single-seat districts for two-year terms. Senate and Assembly districts consisted of approximately the same number of inhabitants, the area being apportioned contiguously without restrictions regarding county boundaries.

At this time there were two major political parties: the Democratic Party and the Republican Party. The Conservative Party, the Liberal Party, the Right to Life Party, the Libertarian Party, a "Statewide Independent Party", a "Unity Party", the New Alliance Party, and the Socialist Workers Party also nominated tickets.

== Elections ==
The 1982 New York state election was held on November 2. Lieutenant Governor Mario Cuomo was elected Governor, and Westchester County Executive Alfred DelBello was elected Lieutenant Governor, both Democrats. The elections to the other three statewide elective offices resulted in the re-election of the three incumbent officeholders: a Republican Comptroller, a Democratic Attorney General and a Democratic U.S. Senator. The approximate party strength at this election, as expressed by the vote for Governor, was: Democrats 2,560,000; Republicans 2,249,000; Conservatives 230,000; Liberals 116,000; Right to Life 52,000; Libertarians 17,000; Statewide Independents 16,000; Unity 6,000; New Alliance 5,000; and Socialist Workers 4,000.

Sixteen of the nineteen women members of the previous legislature—State Senators Carol Berman (Dem.), of Lawrence; Mary B. Goodhue (Rep.), a lawyer of Mount Kisco; Olga A. Méndez (Dem.), of East Harlem, and Linda Winikow (Dem.), of Spring Valley; and Assemblywomen Elizabeth Connelly (Dem.), of Staten Island; Pinny Cooke (Rep.), of Rochester; Geraldine L. Daniels (Dem.), of the Bronx; Gloria Davis (Dem.), of the Bronx; Eileen C. Dugan (Dem.), of Brooklyn; Aurelia Greene (Dem.), of the Bronx; Rhoda S. Jacobs (Dem.), of Brooklyn; Gerdi E. Lipschutz (Dem.), of Queens; May W. Newburger (Dem.), of Great Neck; Toni Rettaliata (Rep.), of Huntington; Gail S. Shaffer (Dem.), of North Blenheim; and Helene Weinstein (Dem.), a lawyer of Brooklyn—were re-elected. Anna V. Jefferson (Dem.), an accountant of Brooklyn, was also elected to the State Senate. Cynthia Jenkins (Dem.), a librarian of Queens; Helen M. Marshall (Dem.), a teacher and librarian of Queens; Nettie Mayersohn (Dem.), of Queens; Mary M. McPhillips (Dem.), of Middletown; Barbara Patton (Dem.), a lawyer of Hempstead; and Louise M. Slaughter (Dem.), of Fairport; were also elected to the Assembly. Gail S. Shaffer did not take her seat in the Assembly, and was appointed as Secretary of State of New York instead.

On May 24, 1983, Julia Harrison (Dem.), of Queens, was elected to fill a vacancy in the Assembly. Thus the 185th Legislature finished having 23 women members, surpassing the previous record of 19 in the 184th New York State Legislature (in 1982).

The 1983 New York state election was held on November 8. One vacancy in the Assembly was filled.

== Sessions ==
The Legislature met for the first regular session (the 206th) at the State Capitol in Albany on January 5, 1983; and recessed indefinitely on June 28.

Stanley Fink (Dem.) was re-elected Speaker of the Assembly.

Warren M. Anderson (Rep.) was re-elected Temporary President of the Senate.

The Legislature met for a special session on September 15, 1983, to consider changes to the laws concerning transportation of cargoes.

The Legislature met for the second regular session (the 207th) at the State Capitol in Albany on January 4, 1984; and recessed indefinitely shortly before 2 a.m. on July 1.

An hour after midnight, on May 30, the State Assembly rejected after a stormy debate of many hours the proposal to raise the legal drinking age from 19 to 21 years; the vote stood 80 to 69.

The Legislature met for another special session on December 6, 1984. At this session, the legislators raised the wages of the legislators who were elected to the next Legislature; approved a sales tax increase for Erie County; and extended a corporate tax surcharge used to subsidize the New York City mass transit system.

== State Senate ==
=== Senators ===
The asterisk (*) denotes members of the previous Legislature who continued in office as members of this Legislature. Andrew Jenkins and Lloyd Stephen Riford Jr. changed from the Assembly to the Senate at the beginning of this Legislature. Assemblyman Leonard P. Stavisky was elected to fill a vacancy in the Senate.

Note: For brevity, the chairmanships omit the words "...the Committee on (the)..."

District	Senator	Party	Notes
1st	Kenneth LaValle*	Rep./Cons.	
2nd	James J. Lack*	Rep./Cons.	
3rd	Caesar Trunzo*	Rep./Cons./RTL	
4th	Owen H. Johnson*	Rep./Cons./RTL	
5th	Ralph J. Marino*	Rep./Cons.	
6th	John R. Dunne*	Rep./Cons.	
7th	Michael J. Tully Jr.*	Rep./Cons.	
8th	Norman J. Levy*	Rep./Cons.	Chairman of Transportation
9th	Carol Berman*	Dem./Lib.	
10th	Andrew Jenkins*	Dem./Lib.	
11th	Frank Padavan*	Rep./Cons./RTL	
12th	Gary L. Ackerman*	Dem./Lib.	on March 1, 1983, elected to the 98th U.S. Congress
12th	Leonard P. Stavisky*	Democrat	on April 12, 1983, elected to fill vacancy
13th	Emanuel R. Gold*	Dem./Lib.	
14th	Anthony V. Gazzara*	Dem./Cons./RTL	on May 23, 1983, appointed as Chairman of the NYS Liquor Authority
14th	George Onorato	Democrat	on June 28, 1983, elected to fill vacancy
15th	Martin J. Knorr*	Rep./Cons./RTL	
16th	Jeremy S. Weinstein*	Dem./Lib.	
17th	Howard E. Babbush*	Dem./Lib.	
18th	Donald Halperin*	Democrat	
19th	Martin M. Solomon*	Democrat	
20th	Thomas J. Bartosiewicz*	Democrat	
21st	Marty Markowitz*	Democrat	
22nd	Anna V. Jefferson	Democrat	
23rd	Joseph G. Montalto	Dem./Lib.	
24th	John J. Marchi*	Rep./Dem./Cons.	Chairman of Finance
25th	Martin Connor*	Dem./Lib.	
26th	Roy M. Goodman*	Rep./Lib.	
27th	Manfred Ohrenstein*	Dem./Lib.	Minority Leader
28th	Franz S. Leichter*	Dem./Lib.	
29th	Leon Bogues*	Dem./Lib.	
30th	Olga A. Méndez*	Dem./Lib.	
31st	Joseph L. Galiber*	Dem./Lib.	
32nd	Israel Ruiz Jr.*	Dem./Lib.	
33rd	Abraham Bernstein*	Dem./Lib.	
34th	John D. Calandra*	Rep./Cons./RTL	
35th	John E. Flynn*	Rep./Cons./RTL	
36th	Joseph R. Pisani*	Rep./Cons.	resigned on June 27, 1984
37th	Mary B. Goodhue*	Rep./Cons.	
38th	Linda Winikow*	Dem./Lib.	
39th	Richard E. Schermerhorn*	Rep./Cons./RTL	
40th	Charles D. Cook*	Rep./Cons.	
41st	Jay P. Rolison Jr.*	Rep./Cons.	
42nd	Howard C. Nolan Jr.*	Dem./Lib.	
43rd	Joseph Bruno*	Rep./Cons.	
44th	Hugh T. Farley*	Rep./Cons./RTL	
45th	Ronald B. Stafford*	Rep./Cons.	
46th	Hugh Douglas Barclay*	Rep./Cons.	
47th	James H. Donovan*	Rep./Cons.	Chairman of Education
48th	Martin S. Auer*	Rep./Cons.	
49th	Tarky Lombardi Jr.*	Rep./Cons.	
50th	Lloyd Stephen Riford Jr.*	Rep./Cons.	
51st	Warren M. Anderson*	Rep./Cons.	re-elected Temporary President
52nd	William T. Smith*	Rep./Cons.	
53rd	L. Paul Kehoe*	Rep./Cons.	
54th	John D. Perry*	Democrat	
55th	William M. Steinfeldt*	Republican	
56th	Jess J. Present*	Republican	
57th	William Stachowski*	Democrat	
58th	Anthony M. Masiello*	Dem./Lib.	
59th	Dale M. Volker*	Rep./Cons./RTL	
60th	Walter J. Floss Jr.*	Rep./Cons./RTL	
61st	John B. Daly*	Rep./Cons.	

=== Employees ===
- Secretary: Stephen F. Sloan

== State Assembly ==
=== Assemblymen ===
The asterisk (*) denotes members of the previous Legislature who continued in office as members of this Legislature.

Note: For brevity, the chairmanships omit the words "...the Committee on (the)..."

District	Assemblymen	Party	Notes
1st	Joseph Sawicki Jr.	Rep./RTL	
2nd	John L. Behan*	Rep./Cons./RTL	
3rd	Icilio W. Bianchi Jr.*	Democrat	
4th	George J. Hochbrueckner*	Democrat	
5th	Paul E. Harenberg*	Democrat	
6th	Robert C. Wertz*	Rep./Cons./RTL	
7th	Thomas F. Barraga	Rep./Cons./RTL	
8th	John C. Cochrane*	Rep./Cons.	
9th	John J. Flanagan*	Rep./Cons./RTL	
10th	Toni Rettaliata*	Rep./Cons.	Chairwoman of the Minority Steering Committee
11th	Patrick G. Halpin*	Democrat	
12th	Philip B. Healey*	Rep./Cons.	
13th	Lewis J. Yevoli*	Democrat	
14th	Frederick E. Parola*	Rep./Cons.	Assistant Minority Whip
15th	Angelo F. Orazio*	Dem./Lib.	
16th	May W. Newburger*	Dem./Lib.	
17th	Kemp Hannon*	Rep./Cons.	Minority Leader pro tempore
18th	Barbara Patton	Dem./Lib.	
19th	Armand P. D'Amato*	Rep./Cons.	
20th	Arthur J. Kremer*	Dem./Lib.	Chairman of Ways and Means
21st	Gregory R. Becker	Rep./Cons.	
22nd	George H. Madison*	Rep./Cons.	
23rd	Gerdi E. Lipschutz*	Democrat	
24th	Saul Weprin*	Dem./Lib.	
25th	John F. Duane	Democrat	
26th	Leonard P. Stavisky*	Dem./Lib.	on April 12, 1983, elected to the State Senate
26th	Julia Harrison	Dem./Lib.	on May 24, 1983, elected to fill vacancy
27th	Nettie Mayersohn	Democrat	
28th	Alan G. Hevesi*	Dem./Lib.	
29th	Cynthia Jenkins	Dem./Lib.	
30th	Ralph Goldstein*	Dem./Lib.	
31st	Anthony S. Seminerio*	Dem./Cons.	
32nd	Edward Abramson*	Democrat	
33rd	Alton Waldon	Dem./Lib.	
34th	Ivan C. Lafayette*	Dem./Lib.	
35th	Helen M. Marshall	Democrat	
36th	Denis J. Butler*	Democrat	
37th	Clifford E. Wilson*	Dem./Lib.	
38th	Frederick D. Schmidt*	Dem./RTL	
39th	Stanley Fink*	Dem./Lib.	re-elected Speaker
40th	Edward Griffith*	Dem./Lib.	
41st	Helene Weinstein*	Democrat	
42nd	Rhoda S. Jacobs*	Dem./Lib.	
43rd	Clarence Norman Jr.	Dem./Lib.	
44th	Mel Miller*	Dem./Lib.	
45th	Daniel L. Feldman*	Democrat	
46th	Howard L. Lasher*	Dem./Lib.	
47th	Frank J. Barbaro*	Dem./Lib.	
48th	Dov Hikind	Democrat	
49th	Louis Freda*	Dem./Lib.	
50th	Joseph R. Lentol*	Democrat	
51st	Joseph Ferris*	Dem./Lib.	
52nd	Eileen C. Dugan*	Dem./Lib.	
53rd	Victor L. Robles*	Dem./Rep./Lib.	on November 6, 1984, elected to the New York City Council
54th	Thomas F. Catapano	Dem./Lib.	
55th	William F. Boyland*	Dem./Lib.	
56th	Albert Vann*	Dem./Lib.	
57th	Roger L. Green*	Dem./Lib.	
58th	Elizabeth Connelly*	Democrat	
59th	Eric N. Vitaliano	Dem./RTL	
60th	Robert A. Straniere*	Rep./Cons./RTL	
61st	William F. Passannante*	Dem./Lib.	
62nd	Sheldon Silver*	Dem./Lib.	
63rd	Steven Sanders*	Dem./Lib.	
64th	Richard N. Gottfried*	Dem./Lib.	
65th	Alexander B. Grannis*	Dem./Lib.	
66th	Mark Alan Siegel*	Dem./Lib.	
67th	Jerrold Nadler*	Dem./Lib.	
68th	Angelo Del Toro*	Dem./Lib.	
69th	Edward C. Sullivan*	Dem./Lib.	
70th	Geraldine L. Daniels*	Dem./Lib.	
71st	Herman D. Farrell Jr.*	Dem./Lib.	
72nd	John Brian Murtaugh*	Dem./Lib.	
73rd	José E. Serrano*	Dem./Lib.	
74th	Louis Niñé*	Democrat	died on March 14, 1983
74th	Hector L. Diaz	Dem./Rep.	on May 24, 1983, elected to fill vacancy
75th	John C. Dearie*	Dem./Lib.	
76th	Aurelia Greene*	Democrat	
77th	Jose Rivera	Democrat	
78th	Gloria Davis*	Dem./Lib.	
79th	George Friedman*	Dem./Lib.	
80th	G. Oliver Koppell*	Dem./Lib.	
81st	Eliot Engel*	Dem./Lib.	
82nd	Vincent A. Marchiselli*	Dem./Lib.	
83rd	Nicholas A. Spano*	Rep./Cons.	
84th	Gordon W. Burrows*	Rep./Cons.	
85th	John M. Perone*	Rep./Cons.	
86th	Richard L. Brodsky	Dem./Lib.	
87th	Peter M. Sullivan*	Rep./Cons.	
88th	John R. Branca	Dem./Lib.	on July 12, 1983, appointed as Chairman of the NYS Athletic Commission
88th	Gregory P. Young	Democrat	on November 8, 1983, elected to fill vacancy
89th	Henry William Barnett	Republican	
90th	Vincent Leibell	Republican	
91st	William J. Ryan	Democrat	
92nd	Robert J. Connor	Dem./Lib.	
93rd	Eugene Levy*	Republican	
94th	Mary M. McPhillips	Democrat	
95th	William J. Larkin Jr.*	Rep./Cons./RTL	
96th	Lawrence E. Bennett	Democrat	
97th	Stephen M. Saland*	Rep./Cons.	
98th	Richard I. Coombe	Rep./Cons.	
99th	Glenn E. Warren*	Rep./Cons.	
100th	Neil W. Kelleher*	Rep./Cons./RTL	
101st	Maurice D. Hinchey*	Dem./Lib.	
102nd	Clarence D. Lane*	Rep./Cons.	
103rd	Michael J. Hoblock Jr.*	Rep./Cons.	
104th	Richard J. Conners*	Dem./Lib.	
105th	(Gail S. Shaffer)*	Dem./Lib.	on January 1, 1983, appointed as Secretary of State of New York
105th	Paul D. Tonko	Democrat	on April 12, 1983, elected to fill vacancy
106th	Michael R. McNulty	Dem./Lib.	
107th	James Tedisco	Rep./Cons./RTL	
108th	Robert A. D'Andrea*	Rep./Cons.	
109th	Glenn H. Harris*	Rep./Cons.	
110th	Andrew W. Ryan Jr.*	Rep./Cons.	
111th	John W. McCann	Republican	
112th	John G. A. O'Neil*	Republican	
113th	Anthony J. Casale*	Rep./Cons.	
114th	H. Robert Nortz*	Rep./Cons.	
115th	William R. Sears*	Rep./Cons./RTL	
116th	Richard S. Ruggiero*	Democrat	
117th	Ray T. Chesbro*	Rep./Cons.	
118th	Michael J. Bragman*	Dem./Cons.	
119th	William E. Bush*	Rep./Cons.	
120th	Melvin N. Zimmer*	Dem./Cons./RTL	
121st	Hyman M. Miller*	Rep./Cons.	
122nd	Clarence D. Rappleyea Jr.*	Rep./Cons.	Minority Leader
123rd	James W. McCabe*	Democrat	
124th	James R. Tallon Jr.*	Democrat	
125th	Hugh S. MacNeil*	Republican	
126th	George H. Winner Jr.*	Rep./Cons.	
127th	Randy Kuhl*	Rep./Cons.	
128th	Michael F. Nozzolio	Rep./Cons.	
129th	Frank G. Talomie Sr.*	Rep./Cons.	
130th	Louise M. Slaughter	Democrat	
131st	Gary Proud*	Dem./RTL	
132nd	Pinny Cooke*	Republican	
133rd	David F. Gantt	Dem./Lib.	
134th	Roger J. Robach*	Dem./Cons./RTL	
135th	James F. Nagle*	Rep./Cons.	
136th	Richard C. Wesley	Republican	
137th	R. Stephen Hawley*	Republican	
138th	Joseph T. Pillittere*	Dem./RTL	
139th	Matthew J. Murphy Jr.*	Dem./Cons./RTL	
140th	Robin L. Schimminger*	Democrat	
141st	Arthur O. Eve*	Dem./Lib.	
142nd	John B. Sheffer II*	Republican	
143rd	Dennis T. Gorski*	Dem./Cons.	
144th	William B. Hoyt*	Dem./Lib.	
145th	Richard J. Keane*	Dem./Cons.	
146th	Francis J. Pordum	Dem./RTL	
147th	L. William Paxon	Rep./Cons./RTL	
148th	Vincent J. Graber Sr.*	Dem./Cons.	
149th	Daniel B. Walsh*	Democrat	Majority Leader
150th	William L. Parment	Dem./Lib.	

=== Employees ===
- Clerk: Catherine A. Carey

== Sources ==
- VOTING IN NEW YORK STATE FOR 61 SEATS IN THE SENATE in The New York Times on November 4, 1982
- VOTE TOTALS FOR RACES IN THE NEW YORK STATE ASSEMBLY in The New York Times on November 4, 1982
