= 183rd New York State Legislature =

New York state legislative session

←	182nd	184th	→
- New York State Capitol (2009)

Overview
- Legislative body: New York State Legislature
- Jurisdiction: New York, United States
- Term: January 1, 1979 – December 31, 1980

Senate
- Members: 60
- President: Lt. Gov. Mario Cuomo (D)
- Temporary President: Warren M. Anderson (R)
- Party control: Republican (35–25)

Assembly
- Members: 150
- Speaker: Stanley Fink (D)
- Party control: Democratic (86–64)

Sessions
- 1st: January 3 – June 17, 1979
- 2nd: October 25 – November 27, 1979
- 3rd: January 9 – June 15, 1980
- 4th: November 19 – 23, 1980

The 183rd New York State Legislature, consisting of the New York State Senate and the New York State Assembly, met from January 3, 1979, to December 31, 1980, during the fifth and sixth years of Hugh Carey's governorship, in Albany.

== Background ==
Under the provisions of the New York Constitution of 1938 and the U.S. Supreme Court decision to follow the One man, one vote rule, re-apportioned in 1971, and amended in 1974, by the legislature, 60 Senators and 150 assemblymen were elected in single-seat districts for two-year terms. Senate and Assembly districts consisted of approximately the same number of inhabitants, the area being apportioned contiguously without restrictions regarding county boundaries.

At this time there were two major political parties: the Republican Party and the Democratic Party. The Conservative Party, the Right to Life Party, the Liberal Party, the Libertarian Party, the Socialist Workers Party, the Communist Party and the Labor Party also nominated tickets.

== Elections ==
The 1978 New York state election was held on November 7. Governor Hugh Carey was re-elected, and Secretary of State Mario Cuomo was elected Lieutenant Governor, both Democrats. The elections to the other two statewide elective offices resulted in a Republican Comptroller and a Democratic Attorney General. The approximate party strength at this election, as expressed by the vote for Governor, was: Democrats 2,306,000; Republicans 1,913,000; Conservatives 243,000; Right to Life 130,000; Liberals 123,000; Libertarians 19,000; Socialist Workers 13,000; Communists 11,000; and Labor 9,000.

Seven of the ten women members of the previous legislature were elected again: State Senators Olga A. Méndez (Dem.), of East Harlem, and Linda Winikow (Dem.), of Spring Valley; and Assemblywomen Elizabeth Connelly (Dem.), of Staten Island; Pinny Cooke (Rep.), of Rochester; Estella B. Diggs (Dem.), of the Bronx; and Gerdi E. Lipschutz (Dem.), of Queens, were re-elected; and Assemblywoman Mary B. Goodhue (Rep.), a lawyer of Mount Kisco, was elected to the state Senate. Carol Berman (Dem.), of Lawrence, was also elected to the state Senate. Rhoda S. Jacobs (Dem.), of Brooklyn; Joan B. Hague (Rep.), of Glens Falls; May W. Newburger (Dem.), of Great Neck; Toni Rettaliata (Rep.), of Huntington; and Florence M. Sullivan (Rep.), a lawyer of Brooklyn, were also elected to the Assembly. Thus the 183rd Legislature had 13 women members, surpassing the previous record of 11 in the 181st New York State Legislature (1976).

The 1979 New York state election was held on November 6. No statewide elective offices were up for election, and there were no vacancies in the legislature.

== Sessions ==
The legislature met for the first regular session (the 202nd) at the State Capitol in Albany on January 3, 1979; and recessed indefinitely in the early morning of June 17.

Stanley Fink (Dem.) was elected Speaker.

Warren M. Anderson (Rep.) was re-elected temporary president of the state Senate.

The legislature was again in session on and off in October and November 1979, to consider legislation concerning energy matters.

The legislature met for the second regular session (the 203rd) at the State Capitol in Albany on January 9, 1980; and recessed indefinitely on June 15.

The legislature met for a special session at the State Capitol in Albany from November 19 to 23. This session was called by Governor Carey to consider legislation on banking, the State budget, and housing in New York City.

== State Senate ==
=== Senators ===
The asterisk (*) denotes members of the previous Legislature who continued in office as members of this Legislature. Christopher J. Mega, Mary B. Goodhue, Charles D. Cook and John B. Daly changed from the Assembly to the Senate.

Note: For brevity, the chairmanships omit the words "...the Committee on (the)..."

District	Senator	Party	Notes
1st	Kenneth LaValle*	Republican	
2nd	James J. Lack	Republican	
3rd	Caesar Trunzo*	Republican	
4th	Owen H. Johnson*	Republican	
5th	Ralph J. Marino*	Republican	
6th	John R. Dunne*	Republican	
7th	John D. Caemmerer*	Republican	Chairman of Transportation
8th	Norman J. Levy*	Republican	
9th	Carol Berman	Democrat	
10th	Jeremy S. Weinstein	Democrat	
11th	Frank Padavan*	Republican	
12th	Gary L. Ackerman	Democrat	
13th	Emanuel R. Gold*	Democrat	Deputy Minority Leader
14th	Anthony V. Gazzara*	Democrat	
15th	Martin J. Knorr*	Republican	
16th	Howard E. Babbush*	Democrat	
17th	Major Owens*	Democrat	
18th	Thomas J. Bartosiewicz*	Democrat	
19th	Marty Markowitz	Democrat	
20th	Donald Halperin*	Democrat	
21st	Christopher J. Mega*	Republican	
22nd	Martin M. Solomon*	Democrat	
23rd	Vander L. Beatty*	Democrat	
24th	John J. Marchi*	Republican	Chairman of Finance
25th	Martin Connor*	Democrat	
26th	Roy M. Goodman*	Republican	
27th	Manfred Ohrenstein*	Democrat	Minority Leader
28th	Carl McCall*	Democrat	in December 1979, appointed as Alternative Representative for Special Political Affairs at the U.S. Mission to the U.N.
28th	Leon Bogues	Democrat	on February 12, 1980, elected to fill vacancy
29th	Franz S. Leichter*	Democrat	
30th	Olga A. Méndez*	Democrat	
31st	Israel Ruiz Jr.*	Democrat	
32nd	Joseph L. Galiber*	Democrat	
33rd	Abraham Bernstein*	Democrat	
34th	John D. Calandra*	Republican	Majority Whip
35th	John E. Flynn*	Republican	
36th	Joseph R. Pisani*	Republican	
37th	Mary B. Goodhue*	Republican	
38th	Linda Winikow*	Democrat	
39th	Jay P. Rolison Jr.*	Republican	
40th	Richard E. Schermerhorn*	Republican	
41st	Joseph Bruno*	Republican	
42nd	Howard C. Nolan Jr.*	Democrat	
43rd	Ronald B. Stafford*	Republican	
44th	Hugh T. Farley*	Republican	
45th	Hugh Douglas Barclay*	Republican	
46th	James H. Donovan*	Republican	
47th	Warren M. Anderson*	Republican	re-elected Temporary President
48th	Charles D. Cook*	Republican	
49th	Martin S. Auer*	Republican	
50th	Tarky Lombardi Jr.*	Republican	Chairman of Health
51st	William T. Smith*	Republican	Deputy Majority Leader
52nd	Frederick L. Warder*	Republican	died on July 23, 1980
53rd	John D. Perry*	Democrat	
54th	Fred J. Eckert*	Republican	Chairman of Conservation and Recreation
55th	Joseph A. Tauriello*	Democrat	Minority Whip; in 1980 appointed to the NYS Workers' Compensation Board
56th	Raymond F. Gallagher*	Democrat	
57th	Jess J. Present*	Republican	
58th	Dale M. Volker*	Republican	Chairman of Energy
59th	Walter J. Floss Jr.	Republican	
60th	John B. Daly*	Republican	

=== Employees ===
- Secretary: Roger C. Thompson

== State Assembly ==
=== Assemblymen ===
The asterisk (*) denotes members of the previous Legislature who continued in office as members of this Legislature.

Note: For brevity, the chairmanships omit the words "...the Committee on (the)..."

District	Assemblymen	Party	Notes
1st	John L. Behan	Republican	
2nd	George J. Hochbrueckner*	Democrat	
3rd	Icilio W. Bianchi Jr.*	Democrat	
4th	Robert C. Wertz*	Republican	
5th	Paul E. Harenberg*	Democrat	
6th	John C. Cochrane*	Republican	
7th	John J. Flanagan*	Republican	
8th	Toni Rettaliata	Republican	
9th	Louis T. Howard	Republican	
10th	Lewis J. Yevoli*	Democrat	
11th	Philip B. Healey*	Republican	
12th	Frederick E. Parola	Republican	
13th	Thomas S. Gulotta*	Republican	
14th	Joseph M. Reilly*	Republican	
15th	Angelo F. Orazio*	Democrat	Chairman of Energy
16th	May W. Newburger	Democrat	
17th	Kemp Hannon*	Republican	
18th	Armand P. D'Amato*	Republican	
19th	Raymond J. McGrath*	Republican	on November 4, 1980, elected to the 97th U.S. Congress
20th	Arthur J. Kremer*	Democrat	Chairman of Ways and Means
21st	George H. Madison*	Republican	
22nd	Gerdi E. Lipschutz*	Democrat	
23rd	John A. Esposito*	Republican	
24th	Saul Weprin*	Democrat	
25th	Vincent F. Nicolosi*	Democrat	
26th	Leonard P. Stavisky*	Democrat	
27th	Arthur J. Cooperman*	Democrat	on November 6, 1979, elected to the New York City Civil Court
27th	David L. Cohen	Democrat	on February 12, 1980, elected to fill vacancy
28th	Alan G. Hevesi*	Democrat	Deputy Majority Leader
29th	Andrew Jenkins	Democrat	
30th	Ralph Goldstein*	Democrat	
31st	Anthony S. Seminerio	Democrat	
32nd	Edward Abramson*	Democrat	
33rd	John T. Flack*	Republican	
34th	Ivan C. Lafayette*	Democrat	
35th	John G. Lopresto*	Republican	
36th	Denis J. Butler*	Democrat	
37th	Clifford E. Wilson*	Democrat	
38th	Frederick D. Schmidt*	Democrat	
39th	Stanley Fink*	Democrat	elected Speaker
40th	Edward Griffith*	Democrat	
41st	Murray Weinstein	Democrat	
42nd	Harry Smoler	Democrat	
43rd	Rhoda S. Jacobs	Democrat	
44th	Mel Miller*	Democrat	
45th	Chuck Schumer*	Democrat	on November 4, 1980, elected to the 97th U.S. Congress
46th	Howard L. Lasher*	Democrat	
47th	Frank J. Barbaro*	Democrat	
48th	Samuel Hirsch*	Democrat	
49th	Dominick L. DiCarlo*	Republican	
50th	Florence M. Sullivan	Republican	
51st	Joseph Ferris*	Democrat	
52nd	Michael L. Pesce*	Democrat	
53rd	Woodrow Lewis*	Democrat	
54th	Thomas S. Boyland*	Democrat	
55th	Thomas R. Fortune*	Democrat	
56th	Albert Vann*	Democrat	
57th	Harvey L. Strelzin*	Democrat	
58th	Joseph R. Lentol*	Democrat	
59th	Victor L. Robles	Democrat	
60th	Guy Molinari*	Republican	on November 4, 1980, elected to the 97th U.S. Congress
61st	Elizabeth Connelly*	Democrat	
62nd	Louis DeSalvio*	Democrat	resigned on January 9, 1979
62nd	Paul M. Viggiano	Democrat	on March 20, 1979, elected to fill vacancy
63rd	Sheldon Silver*	Democrat	
64th	William F. Passannante*	Democrat	
65th	Steven Sanders*	Democrat	
66th	Mark Alan Siegel*	Democrat	
67th	Richard N. Gottfried*	Democrat	
68th	Alexander B. Grannis*	Democrat	
69th	Jerrold Nadler*	Democrat	
70th	Edward C. Sullivan*	Democrat	
71st	George W. Miller*	Democrat	Majority Whip
72nd	Angelo Del Toro*	Democrat	
73rd	Edward H. Lehner*	Democrat	
74th	Herman D. Farrell Jr.*	Democrat	
75th	José E. Serrano*	Democrat	
76th	Charles R. Johnson*	Democrat	
77th	Armando Montano*	Democrat	
78th	Estella B. Diggs*	Democrat	
79th	Louis Niñé*	Democrat	Chairman of the Democratic Conference
80th	Guy J. Velella*	Republican	
81st	Eliot Engel*	Democrat	
82nd	Sean P. Walsh*	Democrat	
83rd	George Friedman*	Democrat	
84th	G. Oliver Koppell*	Democrat	
85th	John C. Dearie*	Democrat	
86th	Vincent A. Marchiselli*	Democrat	
87th	Nicholas A. Spano	Republican	
88th	Richard C. Ross*	Republican	
89th	William B. Finneran*	Democrat	
90th	Gordon W. Burrows*	Republican	Deputy Minority Leader
91st	John M. Perone	Republican	
92nd	Peter M. Sullivan*	Republican	
93rd	Jon S. Fossel	Republican	
94th	Willis H. Stephens*	Republican	
95th	Eugene Levy*	Republican	
96th	Robert J. Connor*	Democrat	
97th	William J. Larkin Jr.	Republican	
98th	Raymond M. Kisor	Republican	
99th	Emeel S. Betros*	Republican	died on March 10, 1980
99th	Stephen M. Saland	Republican	on April 15, 1980, elected to fill vacancy
100th	Glenn E. Warren*	Republican	
101st	Maurice D. Hinchey*	Democrat	Chairman of Environmental Conservation
102nd	Clarence D. Lane*	Republican	
103rd	Michael J. Hoblock Jr.*	Republican	
104th	Richard J. Conners*	Democrat	
105th	Arlington P. Van Dyke	Republican	
106th	Neil W. Kelleher*	Republican	
107th	Clark C. Wemple*	Republican	
108th	Robert A. D'Andrea*	Republican	
109th	Glenn H. Harris*	Republican	Minority Whip
110th	Joan B. Hague	Republican	
111th	Andrew W. Ryan Jr.*	Republican	
112th	David O'Brien Martin*	Republican	on November 4, 1980, elected to the 97th U.S. Congress
113th	Anthony J. Casale	Republican	
114th	H. Robert Nortz*	Republican	
115th	William R. Sears*	Republican	
116th	Nicholas J. Calogero*	Republican	
117th	John R. Zagame*	Republican	
118th	Leonard F. Bersani*	Republican	
119th	Hyman M. Miller*	Republican	
120th	Melvin N. Zimmer*	Democrat	
121st	William E. Bush*	Republican	
122nd	Clarence D. Rappleyea Jr.*	Republican	Chairman of the Republican Conference
123rd	James W. McCabe*	Democrat	
124th	James R. Tallon Jr.*	Democrat	Chairman of Health
125th	Lloyd Stephen Riford Jr.*	Republican	
126th	George H. Winner Jr.	Republican	
127th	Charles D. Henderson*	Republican	
128th	Hugh S. MacNeil	Republican	
129th	L. Paul Kehoe	Republican	
130th	Thomas A. Hanna*	Republican	
131st	Gary Proud*	Democrat	
132nd	Pinny Cooke*	Republican	
133rd	Andrew D. Virgilio*	Democrat	
134th	Roger J. Robach*	Democrat	
135th	James F. Nagle*	Republican	
136th	James L. Emery*	Republican	Minority Leader
137th	R. Stephen Hawley*	Republican	
138th	Joseph T. Pillittere	Democrat	
139th	Matthew J. Murphy Jr.*	Democrat	
140th	Robin L. Schimminger*	Democrat	
141st	John B. Sheffer II	Republican	
142nd	Stephen R. Greco*	Democrat	
143rd	Arthur O. Eve*	Democrat	
144th	William B. Hoyt*	Democrat	
145th	Richard J. Keane	Democrat	
146th	Dennis T. Gorski*	Democrat	
147th	Richard L. Kennedy	Republican	
148th	Vincent J. Graber, Sr.*	Democrat	Chairman of Transportation
149th	Daniel B. Walsh*	Democrat	Majority Leader
150th	Rolland E. Kidder*	Democrat	

=== Employees ===
- Clerk: Catherine A. Carey

== Sources ==
- New York State Information Handbook prepared for the U.S. Dept of Energy (December 31, 1980)
