= 189th New York State Legislature =

New York state legislative session

←	188th	190th	→
- New York State Capitol (2009)

Overview
- Legislative body: New York State Legislature
- Jurisdiction: New York, United States
- Term: January 1, 1991 – December 31, 1992

Senate
- Members: 61
- President: Lt. Gov. Stan Lundine (D)
- Temporary President: Ralph J. Marino (R)
- Party control: Republican (35–26)

Assembly
- Members: 150
- Speaker: Mel Miller (D), until December 13, 1991; Saul Weprin (D) from December 16, 1991
- Party control: Democratic (96–54)

Sessions
- 1st: January 9 – July 4, 1991
- 2nd: January 8 – July 3, 1992
- 3rd: July 28 – 30, 1992

The 189th New York State Legislature, consisting of the New York State Senate and the New York State Assembly, met from January 9, 1991, to December 31, 1992, during the ninth and tenth years of Mario Cuomo's governorship, in Albany.

== Background ==
Under the provisions of the New York Constitution of 1938 and the U.S. Supreme Court decision to follow the One man, one vote rule, re-apportioned in 1982 by the Legislature, 61 Senators and 150 assemblymen were elected in single-seat districts for two-year terms. Senate and Assembly districts consisted of approximately the same number of inhabitants, the area being apportioned contiguously without restrictions regarding county boundaries.

At this time there were two major political parties: the Democratic Party and the Republican Party. The Conservative Party, the Right to Life Party, the Liberal Party, the New Alliance Party, the Libertarian Party, and the Socialist Workers Party also nominated tickets.

== Elections ==
The 1990 New York state election was held on November 6. Governor Mario Cuomo and Lieutenant Governor Stan Lundine were re-elected, both Democrats. The elections to the other two statewide elective offices resulted in the re-election of the two incumbent officeholders: a Republican Comptroller, and a Democratic Attorney General. The approximate party strength at this election, as expressed by the vote for Governor, was: Democrats 2,086,000; Republicans 866,000; Conservatives 828,000; Right to Life 138,000; Liberals 71,000; New Alliance 31,000; Libertarians 25,000; and Socialist Workers 13,000.

22 of the sitting 23 women members of the legislature—State Senators Mary B. Goodhue (Rep.), a lawyer of Mount Kisco; Nancy Larraine Hoffmann (Dem.), of Syracuse; Olga A. Méndez (Dem.), of East Harlem; Velmanette Montgomery (Dem.), of Brooklyn; Suzi Oppenheimer (Dem.), of Mamaroneck; and Ada L. Smith (Dem.), of Queens; and Assemblywomen Barbara M. Clark (Dem.), of Queens; Elizabeth Connelly (Dem.), of Staten Island; Geraldine L. Daniels (Dem.), of the Bronx; Gloria Davis (Dem.), of the Bronx; Eileen C. Dugan (Dem.), of Brooklyn; Aurelia Greene (Dem.), of the Bronx; Earlene Hill Hooper (Dem.), of Hempstead; Rhoda S. Jacobs (Dem.), of Brooklyn; Cynthia Jenkins (Dem.), a librarian of Queens; Helen M. Marshall (Dem.), a teacher and librarian of Queens; Nettie Mayersohn (Dem.), of Queens; Patricia McGee (Rep.), of Franklinville; Catherine Nolan (Dem.), of Queens; Audrey Pheffer (Dem.), of Queens; Cecile D. Singer (Rep.), of Yonkers; and Helene Weinstein (Dem.), a lawyer of Brooklyn—were re-elected. Nancy Calhoun (Rep.), of Blooming Grove; Joan Christensen (Dem.), of Syracuse; Vivian E. Cook (Dem.) of Queens; Deborah J. Glick (Dem.), of Manhattan; Susan V. John (Dem.), of Rochester; and Frances T. Sullivan (Rep.), of Fulton; were also elected to the Assembly.

The 1991 New York state election was held on November 5. Three vacancies in the Assembly were filled. Assemblywoman Helen M. Marshall was elected to the New York City Council.

On January 28, 1992, Joni A. Yoswein (Dem.), of Brooklyn, was elected to fill a vacancy in the Assembly. Thus the 189th Legislature began and ended with 28 women members, setting a new record.

== Sessions ==
The Legislature met for the first regular session (the 214th) at the State Capitol in Albany on January 9, 1991; and recessed indefinitely in the early morning of July 4.

Mel Miller (Dem.) was re-elected Speaker of the Assembly.

Ralph J. Marino (Rep.) was re-elected Temporary President of the Senate.

On December 13, 1991, Speaker Mel Miller was convicted of a felony, and thus vacated his seat in the Assembly. On December 16, 1991, Saul Weprin (Dem.) was elected Speaker.

The Legislature met for the second regular session (the 215th) at the State Capitol in Albany on January 8, 1992; and recessed indefinitely on July 3.

In June, the Legislature re-apportioned the legislative districts. On June 24, 1992, the U.S. Department of Justice approved the redrawn districts with one exception. On June 30, 1992, the New York Court of Appeals also validated the new apportionment.

The Legislature met again from July 28 to 30, 1992.

== State Senate ==
=== Senators ===
The asterisk (*) denotes members of the previous Legislature who continued in office as members of this Legislature. Joseph R. Holland, William J. Larkin Jr., Stephen M. Saland and William R. Sears changed from the Assembly to the Senate.

Note: For brevity, the chairmanships omit the words "...the Committee on (the)..."

District	Senator	Party	Notes
1st	Kenneth LaValle*	Republican	
2nd	James J. Lack*	Republican	
3rd	Caesar Trunzo*	Republican	
4th	Owen H. Johnson*	Republican	
5th	Ralph J. Marino*	Republican	re-elected Temporary President
6th	Kemp Hannon*	Republican	
7th	Michael J. Tully Jr.*	Republican	Chairman of Health
8th	Norman J. Levy*	Republican	Chairman of Transportation
9th	Dean Skelos*	Republican	
10th	Alton R. Waldon Jr.	Democrat	
11th	Frank Padavan*	Republican	
12th	Leonard P. Stavisky*	Democrat	
13th	Emanuel R. Gold*	Democrat	
14th	George Onorato*	Democrat	
15th	Serphin R. Maltese*	Conservative	
16th	Jeremy S. Weinstein*	Democrat	
17th	Howard E. Babbush*	Democrat	
18th	Donald Halperin*	Democrat	
19th	Martin M. Solomon*	Democrat	
20th	Ada L. Smith*	Democrat	
21st	Marty Markowitz*	Democrat	
22nd	Velmanette Montgomery*	Democrat	
23rd	Christopher J. Mega*	Republican	
24th	John J. Marchi*	Republican	
25th	Martin Connor*	Democrat	
26th	Roy M. Goodman*	Republican	
27th	Manfred Ohrenstein*	Democrat	Minority Leader
28th	Franz S. Leichter*	Democrat	
29th	David Paterson*	Democrat	
30th	Olga A. Méndez*	Democrat	
31st	Joseph L. Galiber*	Democrat	
32nd	Efrain Gonzalez Jr.*	Democrat	
33rd	Jeffrey R. Korman*	Democrat	
34th	Guy J. Velella*	Republican	
35th	Nicholas A. Spano*	Republican	
36th	Suzi Oppenheimer*	Democrat	
37th	Mary B. Goodhue*	Republican	
38th	Joseph R. Holland*	Republican	
39th	William J. Larkin Jr.*	Republican	
40th	Charles D. Cook*	Republican	
41st	Stephen M. Saland*	Republican	
42nd	Howard C. Nolan Jr.*	Democrat	
43rd	Joseph Bruno*	Republican	
44th	Hugh T. Farley*	Republican	Chairman of Banks
45th	Ronald B. Stafford*	Republican	Deputy Majority Leader
46th	John M. McHugh*	Republican	on November 3, 1992, elected to the 103rd U.S. Congress
47th	William R. Sears*	Republican	
48th	Nancy Larraine Hoffmann*	Democrat	
49th	Tarky Lombardi Jr.*	Republican	Chairman of Finance
50th	James L. Seward*	Republican	
51st	Thomas W. Libous*	Republican	
52nd	Randy Kuhl*	Republican	
53rd	L. Paul Kehoe*	Republican	on November 3, 1992, elected to the New York Supreme Court
54th	John D. Perry*	Democrat	
55th	Ralph E. Quattrociocchi*	Democrat	
56th	Jess J. Present*	Republican	
57th	William Stachowski*	Democrat	
58th	Anthony M. Masiello*	Democrat	
59th	Dale M. Volker*	Republican	
60th	John B. Sheffer II*	Republican	
61st	John B. Daly*	Republican	

=== Employees ===
- Secretary: Stephen F. Sloan

== State Assembly ==
=== Assembly members ===
The asterisk (*) denotes members of the previous Legislature who continued in office as members of this Legislature.

Note: For brevity, the chairmanships omit the words "...the Committee on (the)..."

District	Assembly member	Party	Notes
1st	Joseph Sawicki Jr.*	Republican	
2nd	John L. Behan*	Republican	
3rd	Icilio W. Bianchi Jr.*	Democrat	
4th	Robert J. Gaffney*	Republican	on November 5, 1991, elected as County Executive of Suffolk County
4th	Steve Englebright	Democrat	on February 18, 1992, elected to fill vacancy
5th	Paul E. Harenberg*	Democrat	
6th	Robert C. Wertz*	Republican	
7th	Thomas F. Barraga*	Republican	
8th	John C. Cochrane*	Republican	
9th	John J. Flanagan*	Republican	
10th	James D. Conte*	Republican	
11th	Robert K. Sweeney*	Democrat	
12th	Philip B. Healey*	Republican	
13th	Lewis J. Yevoli*	Democrat	on November 5, 1991, elected Supervisor of the Town of Oyster Bay
13th	David Sidikman	Democrat	on February 18, 1992, elected to fill vacancy
14th	Frederick E. Parola*	Republican	
15th	Daniel Frisa*	Republican	
16th	Thomas DiNapoli*	Democrat	
17th	Michael Balboni*	Republican	
18th	Earlene Hill Hooper*	Democrat	
19th	Charles J. O'Shea*	Republican	
20th	Harvey Weisenberg*	Democrat	
21st	Gregory R. Becker*	Republican	
22nd	George H. Madison*	Republican	resigned
22nd	Vincent T. Muscarella	Republican	on November 5, 1991, elected to fill vacancy
23rd	Audrey Pheffer*	Democrat	
24th	Saul Weprin*	Democrat	Chairman of Ways and Means (1991); elected Speaker on December 16, 1991
25th	Douglas Prescott*	Republican	
26th	Morton C. Hillman*	Democrat	
27th	Nettie Mayersohn*	Democrat	
28th	Alan G. Hevesi*	Democrat	
29th	Cynthia Jenkins*	Democrat	
30th	Joseph Crowley*	Democrat	
31st	Anthony S. Seminerio*	Democrat	
32nd	Vivian E. Cook	Democrat	
33rd	Barbara M. Clark*	Democrat	
34th	Ivan C. Lafayette*	Democrat	
35th	Helen M. Marshall*	Democrat	on November 5, 1991, elected to the New York City Council
35th	Jeffrion L. Aubry	Dem./Lib.	on January 28, 1992, elected to fill vacancy
36th	Denis J. Butler*	Democrat	
37th	Catherine Nolan*	Democrat	
38th	Frederick D. Schmidt*	Democrat	
39th	Anthony J. Genovesi*	Democrat	
40th	Edward Griffith*	Democrat	
41st	Helene Weinstein*	Democrat	
42nd	Rhoda S. Jacobs*	Democrat	
43rd	Clarence Norman Jr.*	Democrat	
44th	Mel Miller*	Democrat	re-elected Speaker; on December 13, 1991, convicted of a felony
44th	Joni A. Yoswein	Dem./Lib.	on January 28, 1992, elected to fill vacancy
45th	Daniel L. Feldman*	Democrat	
46th	Howard L. Lasher*	Democrat	
47th	Frank J. Barbaro*	Democrat	
48th	Dov Hikind*	Democrat	
49th	Peter J. Abbate Jr.*	Democrat	
50th	Joseph R. Lentol*	Democrat	Chairman of Codes (1992)
51st	James F. Brennan*	Democrat	
52nd	Eileen C. Dugan*	Democrat	
53rd	Vito J. Lopez*	Democrat	
54th	Thomas F. Catapano*	Democrat	
55th	William F. Boyland*	Democrat	
56th	Albert Vann*	Democrat	
57th	Roger L. Green*	Democrat	
58th	Elizabeth Connelly*	Democrat	
59th	Eric N. Vitaliano*	Democrat	
60th	Robert A. Straniere*	Republican	
61st	Deborah J. Glick	Democrat	
62nd	Sheldon Silver*	Democrat	Chairman of Codes (1991); Chairman of Ways and Means (1992)
63rd	Steven Sanders*	Democrat	
64th	Richard N. Gottfried*	Democrat	
65th	Alexander B. Grannis*	Democrat	
66th	John Ravitz	Republican	
67th	Jerrold Nadler*	Democrat	on November 3, 1992, elected to the 102nd and 103rd U.S. Congresses
68th	Angelo Del Toro*	Democrat	Chairman of Education
69th	Edward C. Sullivan*	Democrat	Chairman of Higher Education
70th	Geraldine L. Daniels*	Democrat	
71st	Herman D. Farrell Jr.*	Democrat	
72nd	John Brian Murtaugh*	Democrat	
73rd	David Rosado*	Democrat	
74th	Hector L. Diaz*	Democrat	
75th	John C. Dearie*	Democrat	
76th	Aurelia Greene*	Democrat	
77th	Roberto Ramirez	Democrat	
78th	Gloria Davis*	Democrat	
79th	George Friedman*	Democrat	Deputy Majority Leader (1992)
80th	G. Oliver Koppell*	Democrat	Chairman of Judiciary
81st	Stephen B. Kaufman*	Democrat	
82nd	Larry Seabrook*	Democrat	
83rd	Terence M. Zaleski*	Democrat	on November 5, 1991, elected Mayor of Yonkers
83rd	Mike Spano	Republican	on February 18, 1992, elected to fill vacancy
84th	Cecile D. Singer*	Republican	
85th	Ronald C. Tocci*	Democrat	
86th	Richard L. Brodsky*	Democrat	
87th	Peter M. Sullivan*	Republican	
88th	Gregory P. Young*	Democrat	
89th	Henry William Barnett*	Rep./Cons.	
90th	Vincent Leibell*	Republican	
91st	George E. Pataki*	Republican	
92nd	Alexander J. Gromack	Democrat	
93rd	Samuel Colman*	Democrat	
94th	John Bonacic*	Republican	
95th	Nancy Calhoun	Republican	
96th	Lawrence E. Bennett*	Democrat	
97th	Donald H. McMillen	Republican	
98th	Richard I. Coombe*	Republican	
99th	Norman E. Greig	Democrat	
100th	Neil W. Kelleher*	Republican	
101st	Maurice D. Hinchey*	Democrat	on November 3, 1992, elected to the 103rd U.S. Congress
102nd	John Faso*	Republican	
103rd	Arnold W. Proskin*	Republican	
104th	Richard J. Conners*	Democrat	
105th	Paul D. Tonko*	Democrat	
106th	Ronald Canestrari*	Democrat	
107th	James Tedisco*	Republican	
108th	Robert A. D'Andrea*	Republican	
109th	James P. King	Republican	
110th	Chris Ortloff*	Republican	
111th	Bill Magee	Democrat	
112th	John G. A. O'Neil*	Republican	died on December 10, 1992
113th	Anthony J. Casale*	Republican	
114th	H. Robert Nortz*	Republican	
115th	David R. Townsend Jr.	Republican	
116th	Ralph J. Eannace Jr.*	Republican	
117th	Frances T. Sullivan	Republican	
118th	Michael J. Bragman*	Democrat	
119th	Joan Christensen	Democrat	
120th	Melvin N. Zimmer*	Democrat	resigned on July 31, 1991
120th	Joseph A. Nicoletti	Democrat	on November 5, 1991, elected to fill vacancy
121st	Harold C. Brown Jr.*	Republican	
122nd	Clarence D. Rappleyea Jr.*	Republican	Minority Leader
123rd	Richard H. Miller*	Republican	
124th	James R. Tallon Jr.*	Democrat	Majority Leader; Acting Speaker from December 13 to 16, 1991
125th	Martin A. Luster*	Democrat	
126th	George H. Winner Jr.*	Republican	
127th	Donald R. Davidsen*	Republican	
128th	Michael F. Nozzolio*	Republican	
129th	Frank G. Talomie Sr.*	Republican	
130th	Robert L. King*	Republican	on November 5, 1991, elected as County Executive of Monroe County
130th	David Van Varick	Rep./Cons.	on February 18, 1992, elected to fill vacancy
131st	Susan V. John	Democrat	
132nd	Joseph D. Morelle	Democrat	
133rd	David F. Gantt*	Democrat	
134th	Roger J. Robach*	Democrat	Deputy Majority Leader; died on September 29, 1991
134th	Joseph Robach	Democrat	on November 5, 1991, elected to fill vacancy
135th	James F. Nagle*	Republican	
136th	John W. Hasper*	Republican	
137th	R. Stephen Hawley*	Republican	
138th	Joseph T. Pillittere*	Democrat	
139th	Matthew J. Murphy Jr.*	Democrat	
140th	Robin L. Schimminger*	Democrat	
141st	Arthur O. Eve*	Democrat	
142nd	Richard R. Anderson*	Republican	
143rd	Paul Tokasz*	Democrat	
144th	William B. Hoyt*	Democrat	died on March 25, 1992
144th	Sam Hoyt	Democrat	on May 5, 1992, elected to fill vacancy
145th	Richard J. Keane*	Democrat	
146th	Francis J. Pordum*	Democrat	
147th	Thomas M. Reynolds*	Republican	
148th	Vincent J. Graber Sr.*	Democrat	
149th	Patricia McGee*	Republican	
150th	William L. Parment*	Democrat	

=== Employees ===
- Clerk: Francine Misasi

== Sources ==
- The 1990 Elections: New York; The Legislature; G.O.P. Adds to Senate Majority While Democrats Keep Control of Assembly by Kevin Sack, in The New York Times on November 7, 1990
- Members of the New York State Assembly 1991 at UCSF library
