= 188th New York State Legislature =

New York state legislative session

←	187th	189th	→
- New York State Capitol (2009)

Overview
- Legislative body: New York State Legislature
- Jurisdiction: New York, United States
- Term: January 1, 1989 – December 31, 1990

Senate
- Members: 61
- President: Lt. Gov. Stan Lundine (D)
- Temporary President: Ralph J. Marino (R)
- Party control: Republican (34 republicans and 27 democrats)

Assembly
- Members: 150
- Speaker: Mel Miller (D)
- Party control: Democratic (92 democrats and 58 republicans)

Sessions
- 1st: January 4 – July 1, 1989
- 2nd: January 3 – July 2, 1990
- 3rd: December 3 – 14, 1990

The 188th New York State Legislature, consisting of the New York State Senate and the New York State Assembly, met from January 4, 1989, to December 31, 1990, during the seventh and eighth years of Mario Cuomo's governorship, in Albany.

== Background ==
Under the provisions of the New York Constitution of 1938 and the U.S. Supreme Court decision to follow the One man, one vote rule, re-apportioned in 1982 by the Legislature, 61 Senators and 150 assemblymen were elected in single-seat districts for two-year terms. Senate and Assembly districts consisted of approximately the same number of inhabitants, the area being apportioned contiguously without restrictions regarding county boundaries.

At this time there were two major political parties: the Democratic Party and the Republican Party. The Liberal Party, the Conservative Party, the Right to Life Party, an "Independent Progressive Party", the Workers World Party, the Libertarian Party, and the Socialist Workers Party also nominated tickets.

== Elections ==
The 1988 New York state election was held on November 8. The only statewide elective office up for election was a U.S. Senator from New York. Democrat Daniel Patrick Moynihan was re-elected with Liberal endorsement. The approximate party strength at this election, as expressed by the vote for U.S. Senator, was: Democrats/Liberals 4,049,000; Republicans/Conservatives 1,876,000; Right to Life 65,000; Independent Progressives 15,000; Workers World 13,500; Libertarians 12,000; and Socialist Workers 11,000.

All sitting 22 women members of the legislature—State Senators Mary B. Goodhue (Rep.), a lawyer of Mount Kisco; Nancy Larraine Hoffmann (Dem.), of Syracuse; Olga A. Méndez (Dem.), of East Harlem; Velmanette Montgomery (Dem.), of Brooklyn; and Suzi Oppenheimer (Dem.), of Mamaroneck; and Assemblywomen Barbara M. Clark (Dem.), of Queens; Elizabeth Connelly (Dem.), of Staten Island; Pinny Cooke (Rep.), of Rochester; Geraldine L. Daniels (Dem.), of the Bronx; Gloria Davis (Dem.), of the Bronx; Eileen C. Dugan (Dem.), of Brooklyn; Aurelia Greene (Dem.), of the Bronx; Earlene Hill Hooper (Dem.), of Hempstead; Rhoda S. Jacobs (Dem.), of Brooklyn; Cynthia Jenkins (Dem.), a librarian of Queens; Helen M. Marshall (Dem.), a teacher and librarian of Queens; Nettie Mayersohn (Dem.), of Queens; Patricia McGee (Rep.), of Franklinville; Mary M. McPhillips (Dem.), of Middletown; Catherine Nolan (Dem.), of Queens; Audrey Pheffer (Dem.), of Queens; and Helene Weinstein (Dem.), a lawyer of Brooklyn—were re-elected. Ada L. Smith (Dem.), of Queens, was also elected to the State Senate. Cecile D. Singer (Rep.), of Yonkers, was also elected to the Assembly.

The 1989 New York state election was held on November 7. Two vacancies in the State Senate were filled. Assemblywoman Mary M. McPhillips was elected as County Executive of Orange County.

== Sessions ==
The Legislature met for the first regular session (the 212th) at the State Capitol in Albany on January 4, 1989; and recessed indefinitely on July 1.

Mel Miller (Dem.) was re-elected Speaker of the Assembly.

Ralph J. Marino (Rep.) was elected Temporary President of the Senate.

The Legislature met for the second regular session (the 213th) at the State Capitol in Albany on January 3, 1990; and recessed indefinitely on July 2.

The legislature met again from December 3 to 14, 1990. This session was called to consider state budget cuts, an increase in CUNY's tuition rates, and an anti-crime plan proposed by Mayor of New York City David Dinkins.

== State Senate ==
=== Senators ===
The asterisk (*) denotes members of the previous Legislature who continued in office as members of this Legislature. John B. Sheffer II changed from the Assembly to the Senate at the beginning of the session. Assemblyman Kemp Hannon was elected to fill a vacancy in the Senate.

Note: For brevity, the chairmanships omit the words "...the Committee on (the)..."

District	Senator	Party	Notes
1st	Kenneth LaValle*	Rep./Cons.	
2nd	James J. Lack*	Rep./Cons.	
3rd	Caesar Trunzo*	Republican	
4th	Owen H. Johnson*	Rep./Cons.	Chairman of Environmental Conservation
5th	Ralph J. Marino*	Rep./Cons.	elected Temporary President
6th	John R. Dunne*	Rep./Cons.	Chairman of Judiciary; resigned in September 1989
6th	Kemp Hannon*	Republican	on November 7, 1989, elected to fill vacancy
7th	Michael J. Tully Jr.*	Rep./Cons.	Chairman of Health
8th	Norman J. Levy*	Rep./Cons.	Chairman of Transportation
9th	Dean Skelos*	Rep./Cons.	
10th	Andrew Jenkins*	Dem./Lib.	on May 7, 1990, convicted of two felonies
11th	Frank Padavan*	Rep./Cons.	
12th	Leonard P. Stavisky*	Dem./Lib.	
13th	Emanuel R. Gold*	Dem./Lib.	
14th	George Onorato*	Democrat	
15th	Serphin R. Maltese	Cons./Rep./RTL	
16th	Jeremy S. Weinstein*	Dem./Lib.	
17th	Howard E. Babbush*	Dem./Lib.	
18th	Donald Halperin*	Democrat	
19th	Martin M. Solomon*	Democrat	
20th	Ada L. Smith	Democrat	
21st	Marty Markowitz*	Democrat	
22nd	Velmanette Montgomery*	Dem./Lib.	
23rd	Christopher J. Mega*	Rep./Cons.	
24th	John J. Marchi*	Rep./Dem./Lib.	Vice-President pro tempore
25th	Martin Connor*	Dem./Lib.	
26th	Roy M. Goodman*	Rep./Lib.	
27th	Manfred Ohrenstein*	Dem./Lib.	Minority Leader
28th	Franz S. Leichter*	Dem./Lib.	
29th	David Paterson*	Dem./Lib.	
30th	Olga A. Méndez*	Dem./Lib.	
31st	Joseph L. Galiber*	Dem./Lib.	
32nd	Israel Ruiz Jr.*	Dem./Lib.	on February 3, 1989, convicted of a federal felony
32nd	Efrain Gonzalez Jr.	Democrat	on November 7, 1989, elected to fill vacancy
33rd	Abraham Bernstein*	Dem./Lib.	died on March 4, 1990
33rd	Jeffrey R. Korman	Democrat	on May 1, 1990, elected to fill vacancy
34th	Guy J. Velella*	Rep./Cons.	
35th	Nicholas A. Spano*	Rep./Cons.	
36th	Suzi Oppenheimer*	Dem./Lib.	
37th	Mary B. Goodhue*	Rep./Cons.	
38th	Eugene Levy*	Rep./Cons.	died on July 12, 1990
39th	E. Arthur Gray	Democrat	
40th	Charles D. Cook*	Republican	
41st	Jay P. Rolison Jr.*	Republican	
42nd	Howard C. Nolan Jr.*	Democrat	
43rd	Joseph Bruno*	Republican	
44th	Hugh T. Farley*	Republican	Chairman of Banks
45th	Ronald B. Stafford*	Republican	Deputy Majority Leader
46th	John M. McHugh*	Republican	
47th	James H. Donovan*	Republican	Chairman of Education; died on August 31, 1990
48th	Nancy Larraine Hoffmann*	Democrat	
49th	Tarky Lombardi Jr.*	Republican	Chairman of Finance
50th	James L. Seward*	Republican	
51st	Thomas W. Libous	Republican	
52nd	Randy Kuhl*	Republican	
53rd	L. Paul Kehoe*	Republican	
54th	John D. Perry*	Democrat	
55th	Ralph E. Quattrociocchi*	Democrat	
56th	Jess J. Present*	Republican	
57th	William Stachowski*	Democrat	
58th	Anthony M. Masiello*	Democrat	
59th	Dale M. Volker*	Republican	
60th	John B. Sheffer II*	Republican	
61st	John B. Daly*	Republican	

=== Employees ===
- Secretary: Stephen F. Sloan

== State Assembly ==
=== Assemblymen ===
The asterisk (*) denotes members of the previous Legislature who continued in office as members of this Legislature.

Note: For brevity, the chairmanships omit the words "...the Committee on (the)..."

District	Assemblymen	Party	Notes
1st	Joseph Sawicki Jr.*	Republican	
2nd	John L. Behan*	Republican	
3rd	John Powell	Rep./Cons.	on November 7, 1989, elected to the Town Council of Brookhaven
3rd	Icilio W. Bianchi Jr.	Democrat	on February 20, 1990, elected to fill vacancy
4th	Robert J. Gaffney*	Republican	
5th	Paul E. Harenberg*	Democrat	
6th	Robert C. Wertz*	Republican	
7th	Thomas F. Barraga*	Republican	
8th	John C. Cochrane*	Republican	
9th	John J. Flanagan*	Republican	
10th	James D. Conte*	Republican	
11th	Robert K. Sweeney*	Democrat	
12th	Philip B. Healey*	Republican	
13th	Lewis J. Yevoli*	Democrat	
14th	Frederick E. Parola*	Republican	
15th	Daniel Frisa*	Republican	
16th	Thomas DiNapoli*	Democrat	
17th	Kemp Hannon*	Republican	on November 7, 1989, elected to the State Senate
17th	Michael Balboni	Republican	on February 20, 1990, elected to fill vacancy
18th	Earlene Hill Hooper*	Democrat	
19th	Charles J. O'Shea*	Republican	
20th	vacant		Assemblyman-elect Arthur J. Kremer (D) resigned on December 14, 1988
20th	Harvey Weisenberg	Democrat	on February 14, 1989, elected to fill vacancy
21st	Gregory R. Becker*	Republican	
22nd	George H. Madison*	Republican	
23rd	Audrey Pheffer*	Democrat	
24th	Saul Weprin*	Democrat	Chairman of Ways and Means
25th	Douglas Prescott*	Republican	
26th	Morton C. Hillman*	Democrat	
27th	Nettie Mayersohn*	Democrat	
28th	Alan G. Hevesi*	Democrat	
29th	Cynthia Jenkins*	Democrat	
30th	Joseph Crowley*	Democrat	
31st	Anthony S. Seminerio*	Democrat	
32nd	Edward Abramson*	Democrat	
33rd	Barbara M. Clark*	Democrat	
34th	Ivan C. Lafayette*	Democrat	
35th	Helen M. Marshall*	Democrat	
36th	Denis J. Butler*	Democrat	
37th	Catherine Nolan*	Democrat	
38th	Frederick D. Schmidt*	Democrat	
39th	Anthony J. Genovesi*	Democrat	
40th	Edward Griffith*	Democrat	
41st	Helene Weinstein*	Democrat	
42nd	Rhoda S. Jacobs*	Democrat	
43rd	Clarence Norman Jr.*	Democrat	
44th	Mel Miller*	Democrat	re-elected Speaker
45th	Daniel L. Feldman*	Democrat	
46th	Howard L. Lasher*	Democrat	
47th	Frank J. Barbaro*	Democrat	
48th	Dov Hikind*	Democrat	
49th	Peter J. Abbate Jr.*	Democrat	
50th	Joseph R. Lentol*	Democrat	
51st	James F. Brennan*	Democrat	
52nd	Eileen C. Dugan*	Democrat	
53rd	Vito J. Lopez*	Democrat	
54th	Thomas F. Catapano*	Democrat	
55th	William F. Boyland*	Democrat	
56th	Albert Vann*	Democrat	
57th	Roger L. Green*	Democrat	
58th	Elizabeth Connelly*	Democrat	
59th	Eric N. Vitaliano*	Democrat	
60th	Robert A. Straniere*	Republican	
61st	William F. Passannante*	Democrat	
62nd	Sheldon Silver*	Democrat	
63rd	Steven Sanders*	Democrat	
64th	Richard N. Gottfried*	Democrat	
65th	Alexander B. Grannis*	Democrat	
66th	Mark Alan Siegel*	Democrat	
67th	Jerrold Nadler*	Democrat	
68th	Angelo Del Toro*	Democrat	
69th	Edward C. Sullivan*	Democrat	
70th	Geraldine L. Daniels*	Democrat	
71st	Herman D. Farrell Jr.*	Democrat	
72nd	John Brian Murtaugh*	Democrat	
73rd	José E. Serrano*	Democrat	on March 20, 1990, elected to the 101st U.S. Congress
73rd	David Rosado	Dem./Lib.	on May 1, 1990, elected to fill vacancy
74th	Hector L. Diaz*	Democrat	
75th	John C. Dearie*	Democrat	
76th	Aurelia Greene*	Democrat	
77th	Israel Martinez*	Democrat	
78th	Gloria Davis*	Democrat	
79th	George Friedman*	Democrat	
80th	G. Oliver Koppell*	Democrat	Chairman of Judiciary
81st	Stephen B. Kaufman	Democrat	
82nd	Larry Seabrook*	Democrat	
83rd	Terence M. Zaleski*	Democrat	
84th	Cecile D. Singer	Republican	
85th	Ronald C. Tocci*	Democrat	
86th	Richard L. Brodsky*	Democrat	
87th	Peter M. Sullivan*	Republican	
88th	Gregory P. Young*	Democrat	
89th	Henry William Barnett*	Republican	
90th	Vincent Leibell*	Republican	
91st	George E. Pataki*	Republican	
92nd	Joseph R. Holland	Republican	
93rd	Samuel Colman*	Democrat	
94th	Mary M. McPhillips*	Democrat	on November 7, 1989, elected as County Executive of Orange County
94th	John Bonacic	Republican	on February 20, 1990, elected to fill vacancy
95th	William J. Larkin Jr.*	Republican	
96th	Lawrence E. Bennett*	Democrat	
97th	Stephen M. Saland*	Republican	
98th	Richard I. Coombe*	Republican	
99th	Glenn E. Warren*	Republican	
100th	Neil W. Kelleher*	Republican	
101st	Maurice D. Hinchey*	Democrat	
102nd	John Faso*	Republican	
103rd	Arnold W. Proskin*	Republican	
104th	Richard J. Conners*	Democrat	
105th	Paul D. Tonko*	Democrat	
106th	Ronald Canestrari	Democrat	
107th	James Tedisco*	Republican	
108th	Robert A. D'Andrea*	Republican	
109th	Glenn H. Harris*	Republican	
110th	Chris Ortloff*	Republican	
111th	John W. McCann*	Republican	
112th	John G. A. O'Neil*	Republican	
113th	Anthony J. Casale*	Republican	
114th	H. Robert Nortz*	Republican	
115th	William R. Sears*	Republican	
116th	Ralph J. Eannace Jr.*	Republican	
117th	Ray T. Chesbro*	Republican	
118th	Michael J. Bragman*	Democrat	
119th	William E. Bush*	Republican	
120th	Melvin N. Zimmer*	Democrat	
121st	Harold C. Brown Jr.	Republican	
122nd	Clarence D. Rappleyea Jr.*	Republican	Minority Leader
123rd	Richard H. Miller*	Republican	
124th	James R. Tallon Jr.*	Democrat	Majority Leader
125th	Martin A. Luster	Democrat	
126th	George H. Winner Jr.*	Republican	
127th	Donald R. Davidsen*	Republican	
128th	Michael F. Nozzolio*	Republican	
129th	Frank G. Talomie Sr.*	Republican	
130th	Robert L. King*	Republican	
131st	Gary Proud*	Democrat	
132nd	Pinny Cooke*	Republican	
133rd	David F. Gantt*	Democrat	
134th	Roger J. Robach*	Democrat	Deputy Majority Leader
135th	James F. Nagle*	Republican	
136th	John W. Hasper*	Republican	
137th	R. Stephen Hawley*	Republican	
138th	Joseph T. Pillittere*	Democrat	
139th	Matthew J. Murphy Jr.*	Democrat	
140th	Robin L. Schimminger*	Democrat	
141st	Arthur O. Eve*	Democrat	
142nd	Richard R. Anderson	Republican	
143rd	Paul Tokasz*	Democrat	
144th	William B. Hoyt*	Democrat	
145th	Richard J. Keane*	Democrat	
146th	Francis J. Pordum*	Democrat	
147th	Thomas M. Reynolds	Republican	
148th	Vincent J. Graber Sr.*	Democrat	
149th	Patricia McGee*	Republican	
150th	William L. Parment*	Democrat	

=== Employees ===
- Clerk: Francine Misasi

== Sources ==
- New York State's Democrats Bask in Glow of Strong Showing in The New York Times on November 10, 1988
- THE ELECTIONS; New York State Senate in The New York Times on November 10, 1988
- Marchi, After 16 Years, Loses Post On Finance Panel in Senate Shifts by Elizabeth Colbert, in The New York Times on January 10, 1989
- The Legislature in The Public Sector (Vol. 12, No. 3, issue of February 6, 1989; pg. 19)
- Special Assembly Elections Set in The Daily Gazette, of Schenectady, on January 18, 1990 (pg. B 7)
