= Endorsements in the 1988 Republican Party presidential primaries =

This is a list of endorsements for declared candidates in the Republican primaries for the 1988 United States presidential election.

== Withdrawn candidates ==
=== Bob Dole ===
List of Bob Dole endorsements

U.S. Senate

- James Abdnor, U.S. Senator from South Dakota (1981–1987)
- Al D'Amato, U.S. Senator from New York (1981–1999)
- Pete Domenici, U.S. Senator from New Mexico (1973–2009)
- David Durenberger, U.S. Senator from Minnesota (1978–1995)
- Chuck Grassley, U.S. Senator from Iowa (1981–present)
- Nancy Kassebaum, U.S. Senator from Kansas (1978–1997)
- Frank Murkowski, U.S. Senator from Alaska (1981–2002)
- Don Nickles, U.S. Senator from Oklahoma (1981–2005)
- Larry Pressler, U.S. Senator from South Dakota (1979–1997)
- Warren Rudman, U.S. Senator from New Hampshire (1980–1993)
- Robert Stafford, U.S. Senator from Vermont (1971–1989)
- Steve Symms, U.S. Senator from Idaho (1981–1993)
- Paul Trible, U.S. Senator from Virginia (1983–1989)

U.S. House of Representatives

- Rod Chandler, WA-08 (1983–1993)
- Steve Gunderson, WI-03 (1981–1997)
- Amo Houghton, NY-34 (1987–1993), NY-31 (1993–2003), NY-29 (2003–2005)
- Andy Ireland, FL-08 (1977–1983), FL-10 (1983–1993)
- Jim Jeffords, VT at-large (1975–1989)
- John Kasich, OH-12 (1983–2001)
- Al McCandless, CA-37 (1983–1993), CA-44 (1993–1995)
- Jan Meyers, KS-03 (1985–1997)
- John Porter, IL-10 (1980–2001)
- Pat Roberts, KS-01 (1981–1997)
- Marge Roukema, NJ-07 (1981–1983), NJ-05 (1983–2003)
- Pat Saiki, HI-01 (1987–1991)
- Daniel Schaefer, CO-06 (1983–1999)
- Bob Smith, OR-02 (1983–1995; 1997–1999)
- Denny Smith, OR-02 (1981–1983), OR-05 (1983–1991)
- Arlan Stangeland, MN-07 (1977–1991)
- Bill Thomas, CA-18 (1979–1983), CA-20 (1983–1993), CA-21 (1993–2003), CA-22 (2003–2007)
- Bob Whittaker, KS-05 (1979–1991)

Governors

- Mike Hayden, 41st Governor of Kansas (1987–1991)
- George S. Mickelson, 28th Governor of South Dakota (1987–1993)

Statewide officials

- Robert H. Lounsberry, 11th Secretary of Agriculture of Iowa (1973–1977)

State legislators

Georgia House of Representative

- Johnny Isakson, Cobb County (1977–1991) and Minority Leader (1983–1991)

Illinois House of Representatives

- Lee A. Daniels, IL-40 (1975–1983), IL-46 (1983–2007) and Minority Leader (1983–1995; 1997–2003)

Iowa Senate

- Calvin Hultman, IA-49 (1973–1983) ,IA-47 (1983–1991) and Minority Leader

Party officials

- Stephen W. Roberts, chair of the Republican Party of Iowa

=== Pete du Pont ===
List of Pete du Pont endorsements

Governors

- Mike Castle, 69th Governor of Delaware

State legislators

Iowa House of Representatives

- Del Stromer, IA-86 (1967–1971), IA-08 (1971–1973), IA-09 (1973–1983), IA-17 (1983–1991) and Minority Leader

=== Al Haig ===
List of Al Haig endorsements

Diplomats

- Arthur W. Hummel Jr., United States Ambassador to China (1981–1985)

Notable individuals

- George Allen, football coach
- Billy Dee Williams, actor

=== Jack Kemp ===
List of Jack Kemp endorsements

U.S. Senate

- Gordon J. Humphrey, U.S. Senator from New Hampshire (1979–1990)

U.S House of Representatives

- Vicente T. Blaz, Guam at-large (1985–1993)
- Beau Boulter, TX-13 (1985–1989)
- Hank Brown, CO-04 (1981–1991)
- Dan Burton, IN-06 (1983–2003), IN-05 (2003–2013)
- Dan Coats, IN-04 (1981–1989)
- Jim Courter, NJ-13 (1979–1983), NJ-12 (1983–1991)
- William Dannemeyer, CA-39 (1979–1993)
- Mickey Edwards, OK-05 (1977–1993)
- Newt Gingrich, GA-06 (1979–1999)
- John P. Hiler, IN-03 (1981–1991)
- Duncan L. Hunter, CA-42 (1981–1983), CA-45 (1983–1993), CA-52 (1993–2009)
- Henry Hyde, IL-06 (1975–2007)
- Bill Lowery, CA-41 (1981–1993)
- Buz Lukens, OH-24 (1967–1971), OH-08 (1987–1990)
- Dan Lungren, CA-34 (1979–1983), CA-42 (1983–1989)
- Connie Mack III, FL-13 (1983–1989)
- Howard C. Nielson, UT-03 (1983–1991)
- Donald L. Ritter, PA-15 (1979–1993)
- Chris Smith, NJ-04 (1981–present)
- Bob Smith, NH-01 (1985–1990)
- Pat Swindall, GA-04 (1985–1989)
- Bob Walker, PA-16 (1977–1997)
- Vin Weber, MN-06 (1981–1983), MN-02 (1983-1993)

State legislators

Alabama House of Representatives

- W.F. Cosby, (Democratic)
- Perry Hooper Jr., AL-73 (1984–2003)

Iowa Senate

- Ray Taylor, IA-05 (1973–1983), IA-09 (1983–1995)

New York State Assembly

- John W. Hasper, NY-136 (1987–1992)
- Michael F. Nozzolio, NY-128 (1983–1992)
- George Pataki, NY-91 (1985–1992)
- Bill Paxon, NY-147 (1983–1988)
- John B. Sheffer II, (1979–1988)
- Frank G. Talomie Sr., NY-129 (1981–1993)
- Glenn E. Warren, NY-99 (1983–1994)

New York State Senate

- Walter J. Floss Jr., (1979–1988)
- L. Paul Kehoe, (1981–1992)
- Dale M. Volker, NY-59 (1983–2010)

Notable individuals

- Tom Landry, football coach
- Joe Namath, football player
- Don Shula, football coach
- Pat Summerall, football player
- Johnny Unitas, football player

=== Paul Laxalt ===
List of Paul Laxalt endorsements

U.S. Senate

- Jake Garn, U.S. Senator from Utah (1974–1993)
- Orrin Hatch, U.S. Senator from Utah (1977–2019)
- Chic Hecht, U.S. Senator from Nevada (1983–1989)
- Ted Stevens, U.S. Senator from Alaska (1968–2009)
- Malcolm Wallop, U.S. Senator from Wyoming (1977–1995)

Notable individuals

- Joseph Coors, president of the Coors Brewing Company
- John Riggins, football player

=== Pat Robertson ===
List of Pat Robertson endorsements

Notable individuals

- Pat Boone, singer
- Dale Evans, actress
- Meadowlark Lemon, member of the Harlem Globetrotters
- Gavin MacLeod, actor
- Roy Rogers, actor
- Jane Russell, actress
- Charlene Tilton, actress
- Arthur L. Williams Jr., insurance executive

=== No endorsement ===
Declined to endorse

U.S. Senate

- Kit Bond, U.S. Senator from Missouri (1987–2011)

Statewide officials

- Lamar Alexander, 45th Governor of Tennessee (1979–1987)

== Works cited ==
- "Alexander Will Not Endorse Bush". The Leaf-Chronicle. March 23, 1988. p. 8B – via Newspapers.com.
- "Endorsements". Miami Herald. March 5, 1988. p. 20A – via Newspapers.com.
- "Garn throws his support behind Bush campaign". Daily Herald. March 16, 1988. p. 22 – via Newspapers.com.
- "Georgia". The Tampa Tribune. August 30, 1987. p. 8A – via Newspapers.com.
- "Many Southerners In Congress Endorse Candidate". The Daily Times. February 14, 1988. p. A10 – via Newspapers.com.
- "Politics". Tyler Morning Telegraph. March 29, 1988. p. 6 – via Newspapers.com.
- "Texas congressmen either endorse Gephardt, Bush or stay undecided". The Bryan-College Station Eagle. September 26, 1987. p. 3A – via Newspapers.com.
- "Tracking Support". USA Today. August 7, 1987. p. 6A – via Newspapers.com.
- Anderson, Jack (April 4, 1987). "Dole pursues S. Dakota plan". The Salinas Californian. p. 10A – via Newspapers.com.
- Coats, James (November 25, 1987). "GOP governors give advantage to Bush". Chicago Tribune. p. 5 – via Newspapers.com.
- Daubenmier, Judy (November 23, 1987). "Candidates hoping endorsements will tip balance in Iowa". The Gazette. p. 4A – via Newspapers.com.
- Hardy, Thomas (August 24, 1987). "GOP hopefuls display big guns". Chicago Tribune. p. 3 – via Newspapers.com.
- Machacek, Jay (January 22, 1987). "Most N.Y. congressmen back Bush, not state's Kemp". Tarrytown Daily News. p. D4 – via Newspapers.com.
- Ritchie, Bruce (February 18, 1987). "Entourage Is Laying Groundwork For '88". Montgomery Advertiser. p. 1A – via Newspapers.com.
- Worsham, James (May 14, 1988). "Senator discounts GOP 'list'". Kansas City Times. p. A8 – via Newspapers.com.
