= Senator Stavisky =

Senator Stavisky may refer to:

- Leonard P. Stavisky (1925–1999), New York State Senate
- Toby Ann Stavisky (born 1939), New York State Senate
