= Cynthia Jenkins =

American politician

Cynthia Jenkins

Cynthia Jenkins (July 21, 1924 – October 31, 2001) was an American librarian, community activist, and politician from New York.

== Life ==
She was born Essie Cynthia Burnley in Nashville, Tennessee, the daughter of Stephen Alexander Burnley and Maymie McGill Young Burnley. The family moved to Louisville, Kentucky, where she attended school. She graduated with a B.A. from Louisville Municipal College. On April 17, 1949, she married Joseph D. Jenkins (1921–2011), a World War II U.S. Army veteran and insurance broker. Their only child was the Rev. Joseph D. Jenkins Jr. They lived in Springfield Gardens, Queens.

She graduated with a M.S. in Library science from Pratt Institute in 1966, and did post-graduate studies at Columbia University. She worked as a librarian in the public library system in Queens, and at times lectured at LaGuardia Community College and CUNY York College.

She entered politics as a Democrat, and was a delegate to the 1980, 1984 and 1988 Democratic National Conventions. She was a member of the New York State Assembly (29th D.) from 1983 to 1994, sitting in the 185th, 186th, 187th, 188th, 189th and 190th New York State Legislatures. In 1994, she ran for re-nomination, but was defeated in the Democratic primary by William Scarborough.

In 1997, she tried to challenge the incumbent New York City Councilman Archie Spigner in the 27th District's Democratic primary, but was ruled off the ballot. A large part of the signatures of her petition were rejected by Justice Joseph G. Golia of the New York Supreme Court which left Jenkins with less than the required number of 900 registered Democrats who needed to sign. A few days later, the Appellate Division upheld Golia's decision. In November 1997, she ran on the Independence Party ticket, but was defeated by Spigner.

In 2000, she ran unsuccessfully in the Democratic primary for the 10th District State Senate seat, and in 2001, she ran again for Spigner's City Council seat. She was nominated again on the Independence Party ticket but died a week before the election.

She died on October 31, 2001, in North Shore Hospital in Manhasset, New York, after a long illness; and was buried in Louisville, Kentucky.

New York State Assembly
Preceded by Andrew Jenkins	New York State Assembly; 29th District; 1983–1994	Succeeded by William Scarborough
