= Julia Harrison =

American politician (1920–2017)

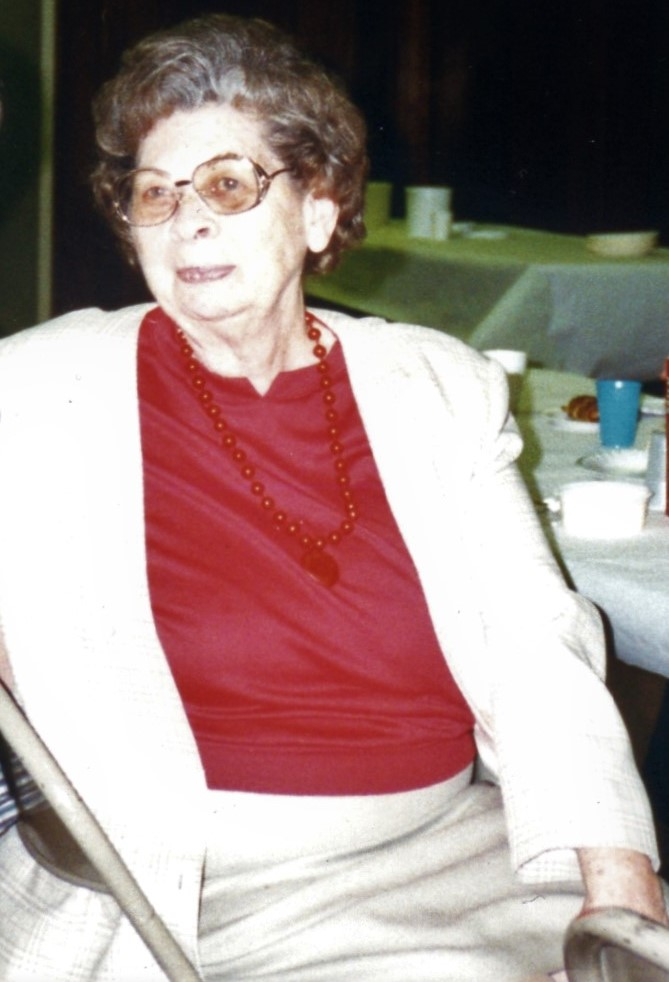

Member of the New York City Council from the 20th district
- In office January 1, 1986 – December 31, 2001
- Preceded by: Edward L. Sadowsky
- Succeeded by: John Liu

Member of the New York State Assembly from the 26th district
- In office 1983–1985
- Preceded by: Leonard P. Stavisky
- Succeeded by: David M. Kramer

Personal details
- Born: Julia Hirsch; June 10, 1920 Rochester, New York, U.S.
- Died: August 3, 2017 (aged 97) Flushing, New York, U.S.
- Party: Democratic
- Education: Queens College

Julia Harrison (June 10, 1920 – August 3, 2017) was an American politician who served as a Democratic member of the New York City Council representing Flushing, Queens, from 1986 to 2001. In 2001, newly enacted term-limit regulations forced Harrison to relinquish her seat. Previously, she represented the 26th district in the New York State Assembly from 1984-85 after working for many years as a community and political activist. After leaving the council, she continued to be politically active, winning the post of Democratic female district leader from Assembly District 22 Part B in 2010.

== Early life and education ==
She was born Julia Hirsch on June 10, 1920, in Rochester, New York, the daughter of Henry and Magdalena Hirsch. Henry, a laborer and factory worker, and Magdalena, a house cleaner and factory worker, both emigrated from Hungary as children, and married in 1919. The family later moved to Manhattan where Harrison attended Public School #9 and New York Evening High School. In 1952, Julia Hirsch married Joseph Harrison and moved to Flushing, Queens.

While living in Flushing, Harrison became a civic activist, involving herself in the union movement, parent-teacher associations, housing co-ops and more. She did not become politically active until 1968, when she participated in Eugene McCarthy's presidential campaign. In 1972, she earned a Bachelor of Arts in political science from Queens College.

== New York Assembly ==
Harrison joined the Democratic Club of Flushing, Whitestone, College Point and in 1972, was elected District Leader for the New York State 26th Assembly District, Part A. Throughout the 1970s she continued to be re-elected to that position and unsuccessfully ran for New York State Senate in 1978. On May 24, 1983, she was elected to the New York State Assembly, to fill the vacancy created by the election of Leonard P. Stavisky to the State Senate, and took her seat in the 185th New York State Legislature. In November 1984, she was re-elected to the 186th New York State Legislature. In November 1985, she was elected to the New York City Council.

== New York City Council ==
In 1985, Harrison was elected to represent the 19th district on the New York City Council, becoming the first woman on the Council from the borough of Queens. At the time, the 19th district covered a large portion of northern Queens including Flushing, Whitestone, Beechhurst, Corona, Bayside and Douglaston. However, the city's districts were soon changed and Harrison's became the 20th, covering Flushing and a small part of Whitestone.

=== Committee assignments ===
During her Council tenure, Harrison served on the Committees for Aging, Education, Government Operations, Health, and Standards and Ethics. She chaired the Standards and Ethics Committee in 1991, and led the Committee on Aging for a number of years. As chair of the Aging Committee, she successfully led a campaign to assist senior citizens with the Senior Citizens Homeowners Exemption (SCHE) and Senior Citizens Rent Increase Exemption (SCRIE) programs. Her committee was also active in other areas, including the investigation of elder abuse; elderly drug abuse; and the state's Expanded In-Home Services for the Elderly Program.

Harrison was also the chairperson of the Legislative Panel on Medical Technology. This panel investigated the use of acupuncture to treat health-threatening issues such as crack addiction, HIV/AIDS and sexually transmitted diseases. The panel's advocacy was instrumental in opening the first acupuncture drug detoxification clinic in Queens at Queens General Hospital. In cooperation with the first Drug Court in New York, this clinic became an alternative to incarceration. The panel also created legislation to install condom machines in public sleeping facilities and to license prostitutes to prevent the spread of sexually transmitted diseases.

=== Flushing-focused efforts ===
Harrison and other community activists created the Coalition for a Planned Flushing in 1989, beginning a decade-long attempt to implement a controlled plan for the downtown area. She used her councilwoman's land-use powers to plan certain areas of her district and acquired city council funds to hire an architect to create a plan for Flushing. Harrison also addressed constituent issues such as airplane safety, prostitution, the MTA's renovation of the Flushing–Main Street subway station, the disrepair of Flushing's Municipal Parking Garage, the erection of a Korean War Veterans monument, various construction issues, and more.

In 1996, she generated unfavorable publicity when a New York Times article quoted her as saying Asian immigrants were "invaders" and "criminals." She apologized for the remarks and stated they were taken out of context. Despite the incident, she was re-elected that fall for her final term in office.

As was the case with many of her City Council colleagues, Harrison's Council career ended on December 31, 2001, when for the first time New York City politicians could not run for the same office they previously held. In 2002, she donated some of her records, covering her years as Councilwoman of Flushing (1986-2001), to the Queens Library archives.

== Death ==
Harrison died on August 3, 2017, in Flushing, New York, from stomach cancer, aged 97. Predeceased by her husband, Joseph, she was survived by her three children.

New York State Assembly
Preceded by Leonard P. Stavisky	New York State Assembly; 26th district 1983–1985	Succeeded by David M. Kramer
New York City Council
Preceded by Edward L. Sadowsky	New York City Council; 20th district 1986–2001	Succeeded by John Liu
