= Pinny Cooke =

American politician

Audre "Pinny" Cooke (December 26, 1923 – August 1, 2004) was an American social activist and politician from New York.

== Life ==
She was born Audre Trupin on December 26, 1923, in Syracuse, New York. There she attended Nottingham High School. She graduated from Ohio State University, as B.S. in 1946, and M.S. in 1948. In 1945, she married Henry F. Cooke (1922–2005), and they had three children. They lived in Rochester.

Pinny Cooke became active in social and charitable work, and entered politics as a Republican. On February 14, 1978, she was elected to the New York State Assembly, to fill the vacancy caused by the appointment of Thomas R. Frey as Director of State Operations. She was re-elected several times, and remained in the Assembly until 1990, sitting in the 182nd, 183rd, 184th, 185th, 186th, 187th and 188th New York State Legislatures.

She died on August 1, 2004, at her home in Rochester, New York; and was buried at the Mount Hope Cemetery there.

New York State Assembly
Preceded by Thomas R. Frey	New York State Assembly; 132nd District; 1978–1990	Succeeded by Joseph D. Morelle
