= Frederick L. Warder =

American politician (1912–1980)

Frederick Warder

Member of the New York State Senate from the 52nd district district
- In office January 1, 1973 – December 31, 1980
- Preceded by: Earl Brydges
- Succeeded by: L. Paul Kehoe

Member of the New York State Assembly
- In office January 1, 1963 – December 31, 1972
- Preceded by: Robert M. Quigley
- Succeeded by: Constance Cook
- Constituency: Ontario County (1963-1965); 141st district (1966); 128th district (1967-1972)

Personal details
- Born: September 17, 1912 Geneva, New York, U.S.
- Died: July 23, 1980 (aged 67) Geneva, New York, U.S.
- Party: Republican

Frederick L. Warder (September 17, 1912 – July 23, 1980) was an American politician from New York.

== Early life ==
He was born on September 17, 1912, in Geneva, New York.

== Career ==
Warder entered politics as a Republican, and was an alderman, and then Mayor, of Geneva.

He was a member of the New York State Assembly from 1963 to 1972, sitting in the 174th, 175th, 176th, 177th, 178th and 179th New York State Legislatures.

He was a member of the New York State Senate from 1973 until his death in 1980, sitting in the 180th, 181st, 182nd and 183rd New York State Legislatures.

== Personal life ==
He married Justine Crandall (1914–2002), and they had three children.

== Death ==
He died on July 23, 1980, in Geneva General Hospital in Geneva, New York, of cancer; and was buried at the Glenwood Cemetery there.

New York State Assembly
Preceded by Robert M. Quigley	New York State Assembly; Ontario County; 1963–1965	Succeeded by district abolished
Preceded by new district	New York State Assembly; 141st District; 1966	Succeeded by Chester R. Hardt
Preceded by Harold I. Tyler	New York State Assembly; 128th District; 1967–1972	Succeeded by Constance E. Cook
New York State Senate
Preceded by Earl W. Brydges	New York State Senate; 52nd District; 1973–1980	Succeeded by L. Paul Kehoe
