= Edward L. Sadowsky =

American politician (1929–2021)

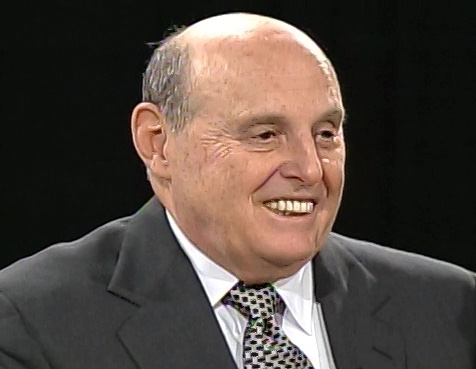
- Sadowsky on CUNY TV's Urban Agenda (1997)

Member of the New York City Council from the 19th district
- In office January 1, 1974 – December 31, 1985
- Preceded by: Rudolph F. DiBlasi
- Succeeded by: Julia Harrison

Member of the New York City Council from the 14th district
- In office January 1, 1962 – December 31, 1973
- Preceded by: Angelo J. Arculeo
- Succeeded by: Anthony J. Mercorella

Member of the New York City Council from the 8th district
- In office January 1, 1962 – December 31, 1965
- Preceded by: James F. Dulligan
- Succeeded by: Bertram R. Gelfand

Personal details
- Born: February 6, 1929 Brooklyn, New York, U.S.
- Died: November 11, 2021 (aged 92) Beachwood, Ohio, U.S.
- Party: Democratic

Edward L. Sadowsky (February 6, 1929 – November 11, 2021) was an American politician who served in the New York City Council from 1962 to 1985.

Sadowsky was born in Brooklyn in 1929. His father was a salesman. His mother was a bookkeeper. He had one sister.

Sadowsky became a member of the New York City Board of Education in 1986. Later that year he unsuccessfully sought to succeed Donald Manes as the Borough President of Queens, New York following Manes's suicide. He considered in running for Mayor of New York City in 1981, but never formally declared his candidacy.

After leaving the Council in 1986, he became a full-time lawyer.

He died of acute respiratory failure on November 11, 2021, in Beachwood, Ohio, at age 92.
