= Geraldine L. Daniels =

American politician

Geraldine L. Daniels (September 9, 1931 – July 27, 2012) was an American politician from New York.

== Life ==
She was born on September 9, 1931, in East Harlem, New York City. She graduated B.A. in political science from Queens College. She married Eugene Ray Daniels II, and they had one son.

She entered politics as a Democrat, and was a delegate to the 1972, 1984 and 1988 Democratic National Conventions. In September 1980, she defeated the incumbent George W. Miller in the Democratic primary for the 71st State Assembly District. Miller ran at the general election in November on the Republican ticket, but was defeated again by Daniels. Geraldine Daniels was a member of the New York State Assembly from 1981 to 1992, sitting in the 184th, 185th, 186th, 187th, 188th and 189th New York State Legislatures. In June 1992, she said that she would not seek re-election later that year, and instead suggested her son Eugene should run for the seat.

On May 23, 1988, she married Theodore A. Henry, and was sometimes referred to as Geraldine L. Daniels-Henry.

She died on July 27, 2012.

New York State Assembly
Preceded by George W. Miller	New York State Assembly; 71st District; 1981–1982	Succeeded by Herman D. Farrell Jr.
Preceded by Edward C. Sullivan	New York State Assembly; 70th District; 1983–1992	Succeeded by Keith L. T. Wright
