= Gerdi E. Lipschutz =

American politician (1923–2010)

Gerdi E. Lipschutz (April 30, 1923 – November 19, 2010) was an American politician from New York.

== Early life ==
She was born on April 30, 1923, in Hagenbach, Germany. She went to the United States in 1937. She married Sam Lipschutz, and they had two children. They lived in Rockaway Park, Queens.

== Early career ==
Gerdi Lipschutz was a Democrat. In June 1974, she was appointed by Mayor Abraham Beame as Executive Director of the Voluntary Action Center.

== New York State Assembly ==
On February 10, 1976, she was elected to the New York State Assembly, to fill the vacancy caused by the election of Herbert A. Posner to the New York City Civil Court. She was re-elected several times, and remained in the Assembly until 1987, sitting in the 181st, 182nd, 183rd, 184th, 185th, 186th and 187th New York State Legislatures. She sat for the 22nd district until the end of 1982 and for the 23rd district from 1983.

Early in her tenure Lipschutz joined State Senator John Santucci in sponsoring a bill to roll back the toll on the Cross Bay Bridge, which carries traffic between the Rockaway Peninsula and the rest of Queens, from 50 cents to 25 cents. The measure was vetoed by Governor Hugh Carey.

== Ethics inquiry and resignation ==
In January 1987, she was the subject of an inquiry by the Assembly Ethics and Guidance Committee. Lipschutz had hired two secretaries who were paid with money from the Assembly, but did not work for her. They worked in the law office of Richard L. Rubin, who was executive secretary to the executive committee of the Queens Democratic Organization and special counsel to the Speaker of the Assembly. Lipschutz testified under an immunity agreement against Rubin who was prosecuted in the United States District Court for the Eastern District of New York. The charges concerned the salaries of Marilyn Wagner, Rubin's law-office secretary from 1980 to 1982, and Mary Robles, who held the post from 1982 to 1986; their pay came from the Assembly, from the Queens Democratic Organization and from Rubin himself, and the government argued that state funds had met most of it although the two did almost no work for the Assembly. Rubin was convicted of conspiracy to commit mail fraud, six counts of mail fraud, and conspiracy to cause the filing of false income tax returns. The United States Court of Appeals for the Second Circuit affirmed the conviction on April 15, 1988.

After a five-week investigation, the Ethics Committee concluded that Lipschutz had falsely certified personal service vouchers and had approved the hiring of a no-show employee. On March 3, 1987, the Ethics Committee debated the issue behind closed doors, but it was leaked that they would recommend that Lipschutz be censured. Lipschutz resigned her seat on March 9, before a vote on the findings of the Ethics Committee could be taken. She had been granted criminal immunity in exchange for her testimony and was not prosecuted. Her seat was filled by Audrey Pheffer, who held it until 2011.

== Death ==
She died on November 19, 2010, in Sarasota, Florida, at the age of 87.

New York State Assembly
Preceded by Herbert A. Posner	New York State Assembly; 22nd District; 1976–1982	Succeeded by George H. Madison
Preceded by John A. Esposito	New York State Assembly; 23rd District; 1983–1987	Succeeded by Audrey Pheffer
