= Toni Rettaliata =

American politician (1944–2020)

Antonia Patricia Rettaliata (née Bifulco; October 20, 1944 – April 8, 2020) was an American politician from New York.

== Life ==
She was born on October 20, 1944, in Huntington, Suffolk County, New York, the daughter of Pasquale Bifulco and Mary (Finello) Bifulco (born 1910). She attended Huntington High School, and Katherine Gibbs School in Melville. Then she worked as an administrative assistant in the Suffolk County courts, and entered politics as a Republican. She married John B. Rettaliata Jr.

Toni Rettaliata was a member of the New York State Assembly from 1979 to 1987, sitting in the 183rd, 184th, 185th, 186th and 187th New York State Legislatures.

In November 1987, she was elected as Supervisor of the Town of Huntington. In November 1989, she ran for re-election, but was defeated by Democrat Stephen C. Ferraro. Afterwards she remained active in local politics, and was Chairwoman of the Huntington Republican Town Committee.

She married Philip Henry Tepe, and ran in local elections as Toni P. Rettaliata-Tepe, but was commonly known as Toni Tepe.

New York State Assembly
Preceded by Mary Rose McGee	New York State Assembly; 8th District; 1979–1982	Succeeded by John C. Cochrane
Preceded by Lewis J. Yevoli	New York State Assembly; 10th District; 1983–1987	Succeeded by James D. Conte
