= Pete Grannis =

American politician

Alexander "Pete" Grannis

Commissioner, New York State Department of Environmental Conservation
- In office 2007–2010
- Governor: Eliot Spitzer; David Paterson

Member, New York State Assembly 68th District (1975–1982) 65th District (1983–2007)
- In office 1975–2007
- Preceded by: Peter A. A. Berle
- Succeeded by: Micah Kellner

Personal details
- Born: January 6, 1942 (age 84) Chicago, IL
- Party: Democratic
- Education: Rutgers University; University of Virginia School of Law
- Profession: lawyer, politician

Alexander B. "Pete" Grannis (born January 6, 1942) is a former Commissioner of the New York State Department of Environmental Conservation (DEC). Before his tenure as Commissioner, he was a member of the New York State Assembly and represented District 65 as a member of the Democratic Party for the neighborhoods of the Upper East Side of Manhattan and Roosevelt Island. His firing by Governor David Paterson in October 2010 was controversial to many especially environmentalists.

== Education and early career ==
Grannis is a graduate of Rutgers University and the University of Virginia School of Law.

His first job with New York state's government was as compliance counsel to the Department of Environmental Conservation.

== New York State Assembly ==
He was a member of the New York State Assembly from 1975 to 2007, sitting in the 181st, 182nd, 183rd, 184th, 185th, 186th, 187th, 188th, 189th, 190th, 191st, 192nd, 193rd, 194th, 195th, 196th and 197th New York State Legislatures. Grannis served as Chair of the Insurance Committee in the Assembly and was a member of several other standing committees. In his capacity as Chairman he authoring New York State's Community Rating/Open Enrollment Law, as well as the 1996 Managed Care Consumer Protection Act. As Insurance committee chairman, he co-sponsored New York's Stem Cell Research Bill.

He promoted the State Environmental Quality Review Act (SEQRA) in 1978.

"Grannis work[ed] for passage of the 'Bottle Bill' and 'brownfields' clean-up legislation [in] 1982."

Other notable pieces of legislation Grannis wrote are New York State's Clean Indoor Air Act (1989), which severely restricted cigarette smoking within public buildings, and the Adolescent Tobacco Use Prevention Act.

He served for a decade as Chairman of the Assembly Housing Committee. He previously served as chairman of an Assembly Subcommittee on toxic waste issues. He served on the Assembly Environmental Conservation Committee his entire time in office.

=== Elections ===
Generally, Grannis was re-elected overwhelmingly in his progressive East Side district. In 1998, Grannis received 23,815 votes to Liberal-Republican Mark H. Snyder's 7,841 votes. He was re-elected in 2000 with 34,230 votes, to Peter McCoy (Republican) with 11,357, and Edward V. Price (Independent), with 580. Grannis had another three-way race in 2002, when he received 18,600 votes on the Democratic and Working Families Party lines, to 9,021 for David A. Friedman (on the Republican, Independence, and Liberal Party lines), and 377 for Ivana M. Edwards of the Green Party. In 2004, Grannis was re-elected by a vote of 37,917 to 11,710 for Patricia Leslie. He was last re-elected in 2006 with a vote of 25,334 to 5,499 over Republican Michael Fandal.

== New York State Comptroller bid ==
In January 2007 he filed an application for consideration by the State Legislature for appointment as New York State Comptroller, filling the vacancy caused by the resignation of Alan Hevesi. He was one of 19 candidates for Comptroller. Alan Chartock called him "One of the most qualified of the legislators" to be Comptroller, but due to "the matter of political balance [it] is tough to imagine either Spitzer or Silver giving the job to another Manhattan politician."

He interviewed with the Assembly Ways and Means Committee, the Senate Finance Committee and the search committee. He withdrew his application for Comptroller after being nominated as Environmental Conservation Commissioner.

== Department of Environmental Conservation ==
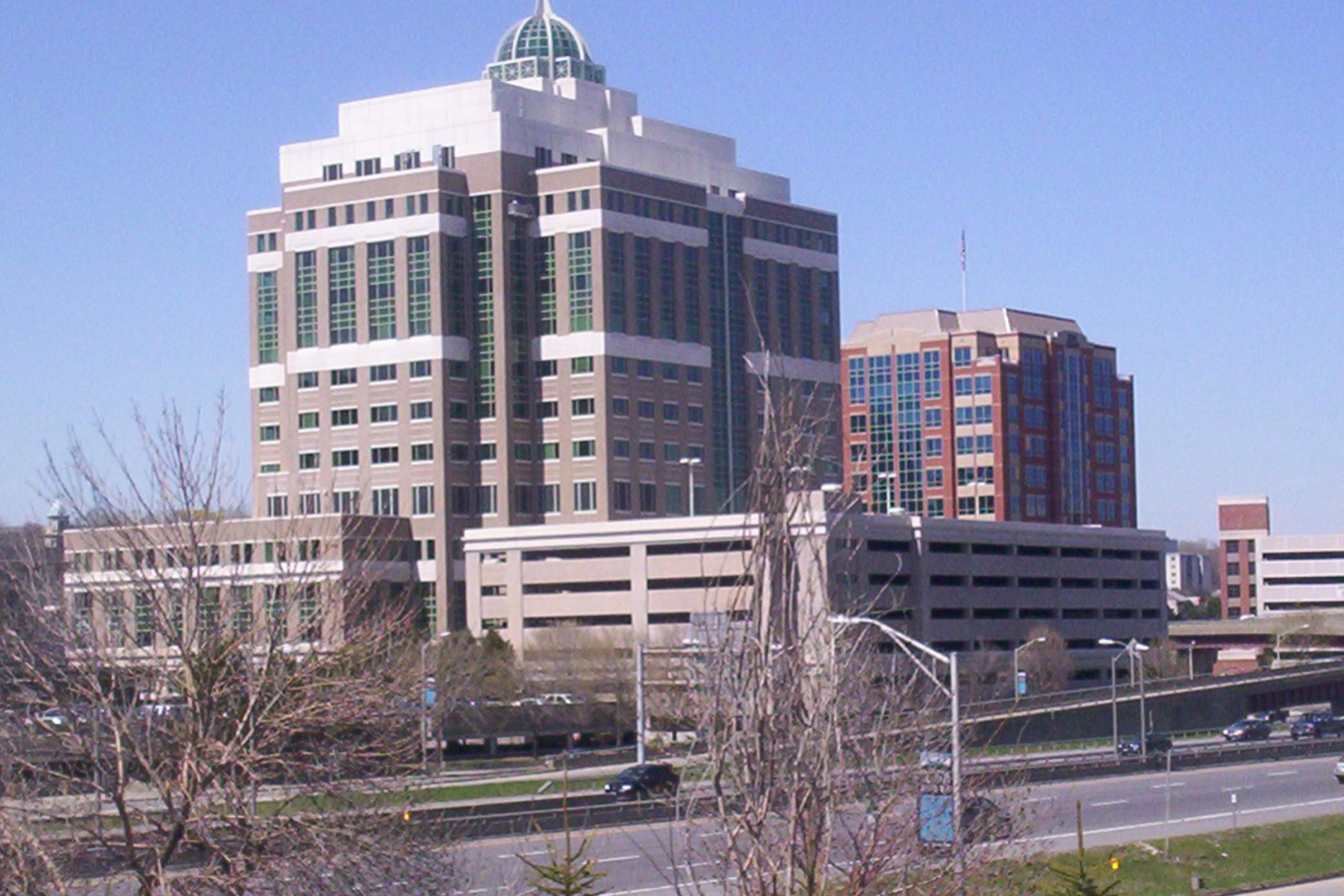
DEC Headquarters in Albany

Grannis was nominated by Governor Eliot Spitzer as DEC Commissioner on January 25, 2007. He was confirmed on April 1, 2007 by the New York State Senate.

As Commissioner, Grannis managed hundreds of employees and represented the state government's ecological efforts. He appointed Peter M. Iwanowicz, as director of a new Climate Change Office, on May 10, 2007. He replaced some of the regional directors for DEC. As part of his duties, he inspected polluted sites, such as Scajaquada Creek in western New York. He had some administrative law duties, which included fining polluters; in July 2007, he assessed "Walter French $48,800 for [a] floating camp at Cranberry L[ake]"

Grannis was also Chairman and ex officio member of the board of the New York State Environmental Facilities Corporation (EFC), a public benefit corporation which funds "programs that help New York State municipalities, agencies and businesses undertake projects ... to be environmentally responsible."

=== Firing ===
On October 21, 2010, he was fired from that position by Spitzer's successor, Governor David Paterson. The firing came after a memo prepared by Grannis, detailing how the governor's proposed budget cuts would impair environmental protection in New York, was leaked to the press.

=== Reaction ===
Environmental activists unanimously reacted negatively to Grannis' firing. A Sierra Club spokesman called his sacking "appalling". Rob Moore, director of Environmental Advocates, said "I think Gov. [sic] Paterson has been dismantling the agency for two years and he’s finally cut off its head." Political commentator Alan Chartock opined that the governor "should have counted to 10 before firing Grannis" because of the deep respect that the public has for Grannis. Robin Dropkin, director of Parks & Trails New York, called his "firing ... deeply unfortunate. Mr. Grannis always has been a strong advocate for protecting New York's air, land and water." Henry Stern, former New York City parks commissioner, called the dismissal of Grannis "a new low" and "so ridiculous that it is difficult to comprehend."

New York State Assembly
Preceded by Peter A. A. Berle	New York State Assembly; 68th District; 1975–1982	Succeeded by Angelo Del Toro
Preceded by Steven Sanders	New York State Assembly; 65th District; 1983–2007	Succeeded by Micah Kellner
