= Angelo Del Toro =

American politician

Angelo Del Toro (April 16, 1947 – December 30, 1994) was an American lawyer and politician from New York.

== Life ==
He was born on April 16, 1947, in New York City. Del Toro attended Brooklyn Technical High School and Manhattan Community College. He received a Bachelor of Arts degree in political science from the City College of New York in 1968 and a Juris Doctor from New York Law School in 1972.

Del Toro entered politics as a member of the Democratic Party and worked as an aide to City Council President Paul O'Dwyer. He served in the New York State Assembly from 1975 until his death in 1994, representing the 129th district. During his tenure, he sat in the 181st, 182nd, 183rd, 184th, 185th, 186th, 187th, 188th, 189th and 190th New York State Legislatures. From 1991 to 1994, he chaired the Assembly Committee on Education.

In 1985, Del Toro ran in the Democratic primary for President of the New York City Council, but was defeated by Andrew Stein. He finished fourth among six candidates.

Del Toro had suffered from kidney disease for more than fifteen years and had two heart attacks in December 1994. On December 30, 1994, he went to Beth Israel Medical Center in Manhattan for dialysis and died during the procedure after another heart attack. He never married.

== Legacy ==
The Puerto Rican/Hispanic Youth Leadership Institute is named in honor of Angelo del Toro. Each year, the Hispanic/Latino brings students from high schools across New York State travel to Albany for a firsthand look at New York State’s legislative process.

The point of this conference is to say to you that you can do it too....you can influence public policies and state policies. You can influence how the government and how society goes on. And that's very important.

— Angelo Del Toro, 1991

New York State Assembly
Preceded by George W. Miller	New York State Assembly; 72nd District; 1975–1982	Succeeded by John Brian Murtaugh
Preceded by Alexander B. Grannis	New York State Assembly; 68th District; 1983–1994	Succeeded by Francisco Diaz Jr.
