= Mary M. McPhillips =

American politician

County Executive of Orange County
- In office January 1, 1990 – December 31, 1993
- Preceded by: Louis C. Heimbach
- Succeeded by: Joseph G. Rampe

Member of the New York State Assembly from the 94th district
- In office 1983–1989
- Preceded by: Willis H. Stephens
- Succeeded by: John Bonacic

Personal details
- Born: New York City, U.S.
- Party: Democratic
- Spouse(s): R. Barry McPhillips (died July, 1998)
- Profession: funeral director
- Website: family business

Mary M. McPhillips is a politician from Middletown, Orange County, New York.

== Political career ==
She entered politics as a Democrat, and was a member of the New York State Assembly (94th D.) from 1983 to 1989, sitting in the 185th, 186th, 187th and 188th New York State Legislatures.

She was County Executive of Orange County from 1990 to 1993; and a presidential elector in 1992.

== See also ==
- ONLY MARY WILL DETERMINE IF SHOW GOES ON By Mike Levine, Published: Times Herald-Record 01/15/07
- IN THE POLITICAL RING, THE NEXT BOUT COUNTS Mike Levine, Published: Times Herald-Record 01/14/07

New York State Assembly
Preceded by Willis H. Stephens	New York State Assembly; 94th District; 1983–1989	Succeeded by John Bonacic
