= Mary B. Goodhue =

American politician in New York (1921–2004)

Mary Elizabeth Goodhue (née Brier; July 24, 1921 – March 24, 2004) was an American lawyer and politician from New York.

== Early life ==
Mary was born on July 24, 1921, in London, England to American parents. She was a daughter of Ernest Brier, later of Grosse Pointe, Michigan, a vice president of the Parke‐Davis Company, in 1948. The family emigrated to the United States, and settled in New York City.

She graduated A.B. from Vassar College in 1942, and LL.B. from the University of Michigan Law School in 1944.

== Career ==
She was admitted to the bar in 1945, and practiced law in Mount Kisco, Westchester County, New York.

She was a member of the New York State Assembly from 1975 to 1978, sitting in the 181st and 182nd New York State Legislatures.

She was a member of the New York State Senate from 1979 to 1992, sitting in the 183rd, 184th, 185th, 186th, 187th, 188th and 189th New York State Legislatures. In 1992, she ran for re-nomination, but was defeated in the Republican primary by George E. Pataki.

== Personal life ==
In 1962, she married Francis A. Goodhue III (1916–1990), a son of F. Abott Goodhue (former president of the Bank of the Manhattan Company) and the Nora Forbes (née Thayer) Goodhue (a daughter of prominent ornithologist John Eliot Thayer and direct descendant of Stephen Van Rensselaer IV). Together, they were the parents of one son:

- Francis Abott Goodhue IV, who married Evelyn Treat Cutler, a daughter of Philip Cutler of Dresden Mills, Maine (the founding headmaster of the Brookwood School in Manchester-by-the-Sea), in 1976.

She died on March 24, 2004, in Northern Westchester Hospital in Mount Kisco, New York.

New York State Assembly
Preceded by Peter R. Biondo	Member of the New York State Assembly from the 93rd district 1975–1978	Succeeded by Jon S. Fossel
New York State Senate
Preceded by Bernard G. Gordon	Member of the New York State Senate from the 37th district 1979–1992	Succeeded by George Pataki
