= Richard S. Ruggiero =

American politician

Richard Salvador Ruggiero (September 20, 1944 – July 24, 2014) was an American politician from New York.

== Life ==
He was born on September 20, 1944, in Utica, Oneida County, New York the son of Thomas J. Ruggiero and Theresa F. (Passalacqua) Ruggiero. He attended Utica Free Academy. He graduated with a B.A. in English from Niagara University in 1966. He also attended post-graduate courses at Colgate University and Syracuse University. Then he taught school in Utica. On July 2, 1966, he married Janis E. Ziolkowski. They had no children.

He entered politics as a Democrat, and was a member of the Utica Common Council (3rd Ward) from 1978 to 1980. He was a member of the New York State Assembly (116th D.) from 1981 to 1986, sitting in the 184th, 185th and 186th New York State Legislatures.

On January 31, 1986, Ruggiero was arrested and charged in Oneida County Court with one count of sexual abuse and two counts of attempted sexual abuse. On March 21, 1986, he pleaded guilty to one count of attempted sexual abuse, a felony. The conviction vacated his Assembly seat.

Afterwards he moved to Hamburg, Erie County, New York.

He died on July 24, 2014.

New York State Assembly
Preceded by Nicholas J. Calogero	New York State Assembly; 116th District; 1981–1986	Succeeded by Ralph J. Eannace Jr.
