= Jeremy S. Weinstein =

American politician

Member of the New York State Senate
- In office January 1, 1979 – December 31, 1992
- Preceded by: Sheldon Farber
- Succeeded by: Frank Padavan
- Constituency: 10th district (1979-1982); 16th district (1983-1992)

Personal details
- Born: June 30, 1950 New York City, New York
- Party: Democratic

Jeremy S. Weinstein (born June 30, 1950) is an American lawyer and politician from New York.

== Life ==
Jeremy Weinstein was born on June 30, 1950, in New York City. He attended Jamaica High School. He graduated from York College CUNY and Brooklyn Law School.

He entered politics as a Democrat, and was a Deputy Assistant New York Attorney General from 1975 to 1976, and Associate Counsel to the Speaker of the New York State Assembly from 1977 to 1978.

Weinstein was a member of the New York State Senate from 1979 to 1992, sitting in the 183rd, 184th, 185th, 186th, 187th, 188th and 189th New York State Legislatures. He served as minority whip and assistant minority leader for floor operations. During his 14 years in the New York State Senate, then Senator Weinstein served on the Judiciary Committee, the Codes Committee, the Banking Committee and the Crime and Corrections Committee. He sponsored numerous bills dealing with criminal justice issues, civil practice, education and the environment. In 1992, he was drawn into a district with fellow Senator Frank Padavan, who defeated him in the general election.

He was a Judge of the New York City Civil Court from 1994 to 1999; and was Supervising Judge of the Queens Civil Court from 1997 to 2007. In November 1999, he was elected to the New York Supreme Court (11th JD.), and was appointed as Administrative Judge of the Queens Supreme Court Civil Term in 2007. Judge Weinstein served as Administrative Judge of the Queens Supreme Court Criminal Term from 2008 to 2009.

Judge Weinstein retired in 2019 and currently serves as a neutral with National Arbitration and Mediation (NAM)

New York State Senate
Preceded by Sheldon Farber	New York State Senate; 10th District; 1979–1982	Succeeded by Andrew Jenkins
Preceded by Howard E. Babbush	New York State Senate; 16th District; 1983–1992	Succeeded by Leonard P. Stavisky
