= May W. Newburger =

American politician (1920–2012)

May Newburger

Member of the New York State Assembly from the 16th district
- In office 1979–1986
- Preceded by: Irwin J. Landes
- Succeeded by: Thomas DiNapoli

Personal details
- Born: May Wallace; January 22, 1920 Springfield, Massachusetts, U.S.
- Died: August 30, 2012 (aged 92) Great Neck, New York, U.S.
- Party: Democratic
- Spouse: Jack Newburger (m. 1948; died 1978)
- Children: 1
- Education: Hunter College (BA); Columbia University (MA)

May W. Newburger (January 22, 1920 – August 30, 2012) was an American activist and politician who served as a member of the New York State Assembly from 1979 to 1986.

== Early life and education ==
She was born May Wallace on January 22, 1920, in Springfield, Massachusetts, the daughter of Augusta Wallace. She received a Bachelor of Arts degree from Hunter College, a Master of Arts from Columbia University, and a post-Master's Certificate from Adelphi University.

== Career ==
She became active in social and women's rights organizations, and entered politics as a Democrat. She was a delegate to the 1972, 1984, 1988 and 2000 Democratic National Conventions. She was Legislative Director of the Assembly Committee on Higher Education in 1975 and 1976; and Associate Director of the Women's Center for Community Leadership at Hunter College in 1977.

She was a member of the New York State Assembly from 1979 to 1986, sitting in the 183rd, 184th, 185th and 186th New York State Legislatures representing the residents of the 16th Assembly District. She was chair of the NYS Assembly Task Force on Women's Issues and served as co-chair of the Legislative Commission on the Water Resource Needs of Long Island, which investigated the water resource needs of Long Island and championed efforts to require closure of landfills and implement groundwater protection measures. She retired from the Assembly in 1986.

She was a member of the Town Council of North Hempstead in 1992 and 1993; and the first female supervisor of the Town of North Hempstead from 1994 to 2003. As town supervisor, she transformed a cumulative budget deficit of $7.0 million into a $7.7 million surplus and moved the town from the lowest to historically highest bond rating ever. This was achieved through her long-term strategic planning which included the Debt Management and Capital Plans, which was to reduce the town debt by approximately $107 million in 10 years.

North Hempstead was named "Town of the Year 1999" by the Long Island Development Corporation and received the "Quality of Life Award" from the Long Island Division of the American Society of Civil Engineers. She spearheaded the reclamation and rehabilitation of the Morewood Property, leading to the creation of Harbor Links, one of the country’s most environmentally-friendly championship level golf courses which has earned the Environmental Stewardship Award and the Audubon Signature Designation.

Newburger helped establish the $15 million Environmental Legacy Fund, used for open space acquisition, restoration and protection of environmentally sensitive areas and for improvement and enhancement of coastal areas and waterways. And she embarked on a most intensive federal lobbying effort to secure funding from the EPA to designate New Cassel as a Brownfields Pilot Community.

A portion of Hempstead Harbor was officially named "May Newburger Cove".

== Personal life ==
In 1948, she married Jack Newburger, and they had one son. She died on August 30, 2012, in Great Neck, New York.She was Jewish.

New York State Assembly
Preceded by Irwin J. Landes	New York State Assembly; 16th District; 1979–1986	Succeeded by Thomas DiNapoli
