= Leonard P. Stavisky =

American politician (1925–1999)

Leonard Price Stavisky
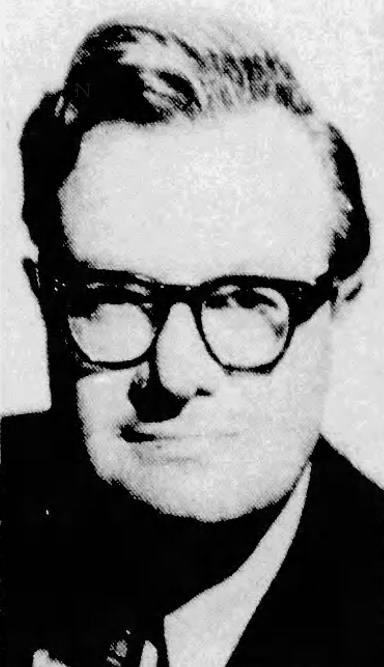
- Stavisky c. 1977

Member of the New York State Senate
- In office April 12, 1983 – June 19, 1999
- Preceded by: Gary Ackerman
- Succeeded by: Toby Ann Stavisky
- Constituency: 12th district (1983-1992); 16th district (1993-1999)

Member of the New York State Assembly
- In office January 1, 1966 – April 12, 1983
- Preceded by: constituency created
- Succeeded by: Julia Harrison
- Constituency: 26th district (1966); 23rd district (1967-1972); 26th district (1973-1983)

Personal details
- Born: September 11, 1925 Bronx, New York
- Died: June 19, 1999 (aged 73) Queens, New York
- Occupation: University professor, Politician

Leonard Price Stavisky (September 11, 1925 – June 19, 1999) was an American university professor and politician from New York.

== Life ==
He was born on September 11, 1925, in the Bronx, New York City. He was Jewish. He graduated from City College of New York in 1945, and M.A. from Columbia University in 1946. Then he taught history and political science at several colleges and universities until 1979. He graduated with a Ph.D. in political science from Columbia University in 1958. In 1964, he married Toby Ann Goldhaar, and their only child is Evan M. Stavisky. They lived in Whitestone, Queens. From 1979 to 1990, he was an adjunct professor of political science at the School of International and Public Affairs, Columbia University.

He entered politics as a Democrat, and was a member of the New York City Council from 1954 to 1960.

He was a member of the New York State Assembly from 1966 to 1983, sitting in the 176th, 177th, 178th, 179th, 180th, 181st, 182nd, 183rd, 184th, and 185th New York State Legislatures. In 1969, he ran in the Democratic primary for Borough President of Queens but was defeated by Sidney Leviss.

On April 12, 1983, Stavisky was elected to the New York State Senate, filling in a vacancy caused by the election of Gary L. Ackerman to the U.S. Congress. He was re-elected several times, and remained in the State Senate until his death in 1999, sitting in the 185th, 186th, 187th, 188th, 189th, 190th, 191st, 192nd, and 193rd New York State Legislatures.

He died on June 19, 1999, in a hospital in Queens, after succumbing to a cerebral hemorrhage.

New York State Assembly
Preceded by new district	New York State Assembly; 26th District; 1966	Succeeded by Kenneth N. Browne
Preceded by Robert J. Hall	New York State Assembly; 23rd District; 1967–1972	Succeeded by John A. Esposito
Preceded by Guy R. Brewer	New York State Assembly; 26th District; 1973–1983	Succeeded by Julia Harrison
New York State Senate
Preceded by Gary L. Ackerman	New York State Senate; 12th District; 1983–1992	Succeeded by Ada L. Smith
Preceded by Jeremy S. Weinstein	New York State Senate; 16th District; 1993–1999	Succeeded by Toby Ann Stavisky
