= David M. Kramer (politician) =

American politician

David M. Kramer (born c. 1920) is an American former politician.

Outside of politics, Kramer worked as a proofreader for The New York Times. He was the Democratic Party district leader for a portion of New York's 26th State Assembly district. He ran for that seat in February 1986, as a special election was scheduled, necessitated by Julia Harrison's election to the New York City Council and subsequent resignation from the New York State Assembly. Kramer placed ahead of accountant Philip Ragusa, a fusion candidate backed by the Republican and Conservative Parties, and Vincent J. Dwyer, a teacher and member of the Democratic Party contesting the election as a political independent. Though he was considered likely to step down after completing Harrison's legislative term, Kramer, backed by Alan Hevesi, instead contested a party primary to seek the Democratic nomination for a full term. The four candidates for the primary were Kramer, Dwyer, Bruce Eiber, and Morton C. Hillman. Kramer finished approximately 300 votes behind Hillman, and was the only incumbent state assembly member to lose a primary during the 1986 election cycle.
