= Frank G. Talomie Sr. =

American politician (1921–1993)

- Born: March 10, 1921; Geneva, New York, U.S.
- Died: December 1, 1993 (aged 72); Geneva, New York, U.S.
- Occupation: Politician

Frank G. Talomie Sr. (March 10, 1921 – December 1, 1993) was an American politician from New York.

== Life ==
He was born on March 10, 1921, in Geneva, New York. He graduated from Geneva High School in 1939. On April 3, 1943, he married Mona Harris, and they had two children. During World War II he served as a pilot in the U.S. Air Force. Afterwards he engaged in the insurance business.

He also entered politics as a Republican, and was County Clerk of Ontario County from 1971 to 1980. He was a member of the New York State Assembly (129th D.) from 1981 until his death in 1993, sitting in the 184th, 185th, 186th, 187th, 188th, 189th and 190th New York State Legislatures.

He died on December 1, 1993, in Geneva, of an embolism.

New York State Assembly
Preceded by L. Paul Kehoe	New York State Assembly; 129th District; 1981–1993	Succeeded by Craig J. Doran
