= L. Paul Kehoe =

American politician (born 1938)

Member of the New York State Senate
- In office January 1, 1981 – December 31, 1992
- Preceded by: Frederick L. Warder
- Succeeded by: Michael F. Nozzolio
- Constituency: 52nd district (1981-1982); 53rd district (1983-1992)

Personal details
- Born: May 21, 1938 Carthage, New York, U.S.
- Party: Republican

L. Paul Kehoe (born May 21, 1938) is an American lawyer and politician from New York.

== Life ==
He was born on May 21, 1938, in Carthage, New York. He attended Copenhagen Central School. He graduated from Syracuse University in 1959, and J.D. from Syracuse University College of Law in 1962. Then he served in the U.S. Army, and began the practice of law in 1963 in Watertown. In 1966, he moved to Wolcott. He married Betty, and they had three children.

He entered politics as a Republican, and was District Attorney of Wayne County from 1967 to 1971.

He was a member of the New York State Assembly in 1979 and 1980;and a member of the New York State Senate from 1981 to 1992, sitting in the 184th, 185th, 186th, 187th, 188th and 189th New York State Legislatures.

He was a justice of the New York Supreme Court (7th D.) from 1993 to 2006. He was the Administrative Judge of the 7th District from 1996 to 2000, and was designated to the Appellate Division in 2000.

New York State Assembly
Preceded by James F. Hurley	New York State Assembly; 129th District; 1979–1980	Succeeded by Frank G. Talomie Sr.
New York State Senate
Preceded by Frederick L. Warder	New York State Senate; 52nd District; 1981–1982	Succeeded by William T. Smith
Preceded by John D. Perry	New York State Senate; 53rd District; 1983–1992	Succeeded by Michael F. Nozzolio
