= Nicholas J. Calogero =

American politician

Member of the New York State Assembly from the 116th district
- In office January 1, 1973 – December 31, 1980
- Preceded by: John T. Buckley
- Succeeded by: Richard S. Ruggiero

Personal details
- Born: August 27, 1924 Utica, New York
- Died: October 9, 2004 (aged 80)
- Party: Republican

Nicholas J. Calogero (August 27, 1924 – October 9, 2004) was an American politician who served in the New York State Assembly from the 116th district from 1973 to 1980.
