= John M. Perone =

American politician

Member of the New York State Assembly from the 85th district
- In office January 1, 1983 – December 31, 1984
- Preceded by: John C. Dearie
- Succeeded by: Ronald C. Tocci

Member of the New York State Assembly from the 91st district
- In office January 1, 1979 – December 31, 1982
- Preceded by: Edward F.X. Ryan Jr.
- Succeeded by: William J. Ryan

Personal details
- Born: June 19, 1945 (age 81) New York City, New York
- Party: Republican

John M. Perone (born June 19, 1945) is an American politician who served in the New York State Assembly from 1979 to 1984.
