= Ralph Goldstein (politician) =

American politician (1921–1986)

Member of the New York State Assembly from the 30th district
- In office 1976 – May 21, 1986
- Preceded by: Herbert J. Miller
- Succeeded by: Joseph Crowley

Personal details
- Born: September 15, 1921 New York City, New York
- Died: May 21, 1986 (aged 64) Albany, New York
- Party: Democratic

Ralph Goldstein (September 15, 1921 - May 21, 1986) was an American politician who served in the New York State Assembly from the 30th district from 1976 to 1986.

== Biography ==
Goldstein was born in New York City on September 15, 1921. He received a law degree from the New York University School of Law.

Goldstein was rumored to be interested in being the Borough President of Queens in 1986. He died on May 21, 1986 from a heart attack. He was Jewish.
