= Robert J. Connor =

American politician

Robert J. Connor (died April 8, 2004) was an American politician who sat in the New York State Assembly. He was a member of the Democratic Party.
