= Gregory R. Becker =

American politician (born 1954)

Member of the New York State Assembly from the 21st district
- In office January 1, 1983 – December 31, 1998
- Preceded by: George H. Madison
- Succeeded by: James Darcy

Personal details
- Born: April 5, 1954 (age 72) Lynbrook, New York, U.S.
- Party: Republican

Gregory R. Becker (born April 5, 1954) is an American politician who served in the New York State Assembly from the 21st district from 1983 to 1998.

== Biography ==
Becker was born on April 5, 1954, in Lynbrook, New York. He attended Nassau County Community College and received his B.S. degree from Long Island University.

In 1998 and 2000, Becker unsuccessfully ran for Congress in New York's 4th congressional district against Democrat Carolyn McCarthy.
