= Lawrence E. Bennett =

American politician

Lawrence Edward "Larry" Bennett (September 15, 1923 – March 9, 2016) was an American politician.

Born in Roseton, in the town of Newburgh, New York, Bennett served in the United States Army during World War II. He worked at Stauffer Chemical Company. Bennett served the Newburgh Town Council and as supervisor. From 1983 to 1995, Bennett served in the New York Assembly and was a Democrat.
