= Frederick E. Parola =

Member of New York State assembly (1979–1993)

Member of the New York State Assembly from the 14th district
- In office January 3, 1981 – January 3, 1993
- Preceded by: Joseph M. Reilly
- Succeeded by: Mark W. Herbst

Member of the New York State Assembly from the 12th district
- In office January 3, 1979 – January 3, 1981

Personal details
- Born: August 29, 1946 (age 79)
- Party: Republican

Frederick E. Parola (born August 29, 1946) is an American politician who served as the representative from 12th district in the New York State Assembly from 1979 to 1983, and was the representative from the 14th district from 1983 to 1993. He later served as Nassau County Comptroller from 1994 to 2002.

== Early life ==
Frederick E. Parola was born on August 29, 1946. He grew up in Wantagh, New York and attended Wantagh High School. After graduating, Parola attended Hartwick College and Albany Law School.

== Political career ==
After receiving his degrees, he worked in the Nassau County District Attorney's Office. Before being elected to the legislature, Parola worked as a legal counsel on the Crime and Corrections Committee in the State Senate.

In 1978, Parola ran for the seat representing the 12th district in the State Assembly. He beat Democratic candidate William J. Reilly. In 1993, Parola retired from the legislature.

From 1994 to 2002, Parola served as Nassau County Comptroller.

== Later life and personal life ==
Currently, Parola works as an attorney. He still resides in Wantagh, New York with his wife and family.
