= James F. Nagle =

American politician (1927–2019)

Member of the New York State Assembly from the 135th district
- In office January 1, 1977 – December 31, 1992
- Preceded by: Donald W. Cook
- Succeeded by: James S. Alesi

Personal details
- Born: November 15, 1927 Rochester, New York, U.S.
- Died: March 26, 2019 (aged 91) Fairport, New York, U.S.
- Party: Republican

James F. Nagle (November 15, 1927 – March 26, 2019) was an American politician who served in the New York State Assembly from the 135th district from 1977 to 1992.

He died on March 26, 2019, in Fairport, New York at age 91.
