= Victor B. Tosi =

American politician (1936–2017)

Victor B. Tosi (March 11, 1936 – December 4, 2017) was an American politician.

Born to Italian immigrant parents, he studied political science at New York University. He served in the military. He married on June 22, 1957 and has two sons together. He worked for General Motors.

After retiring, he became a long-time member of the Bronx Republican Party. Tosi ran for public office five times, including for Bronx Borough President, and briefly served as the chairman of the Bronx Republican Party from 2004-05.

He worked for such Republicans as State Senators John D. Calandra and Guy Velella, Mayors Giuliani and Bloomberg and as the personnel and Labor Relations director and later deputy chief clerk for Bronx County New York City Board of Elections.

== Campaigns ==
Tosi became active with the Bronx Republican Party in the mid-1960s as a protege of State Senator John D. Calandra, the Bronx Republican leader. Tosi first ran for City Council in 1973 in the 14th district against Anthony J. Mercorella, who was appointed to the seat a few months earlier to fill a vacancy.

Mercorella won 70 percent of the vote. The next year, Tosi sought an open seat in the New York State Assembly in the 86th district. Despite a spirited campaign, Tosi, who won about 44 percent of the vote, lost to Democrat Vincent Marchiselli, a pro-life liberal and funeral director who used a wheelchair.

In 1985 and 1989, Tosi ran as the Republican Party's "sacrificial lamb" against popular Democratic Councilman Jerry L. Crispino, who represented the 14th district.

In 1987, State Senator Guy Velella and the Bronx Republican organization asked Tosi to run in the special election for Bronx Borough President, which was held in November of that year. The incumbent Democrat, Stanley Simon, resigned in March 1987 after being implicated in corruption. Tosi received about eleven percent of the vote against Democratic City Councilman Fernando Ferrer. Tosi's opponent on the Conservative Party was Peggy McKeegan, who was also employed by Velella.

== Campaign work ==
In 1989, Velella asked Tosi to manage the campaign of cosmetics heir Ronald Lauder, who sought the Republican primary for mayor against Rudy Giuliani.

Lauder spent about $13 million in negative television ads against Giuliani. Although Lauder lost the primary, getting about 34 percent of the vote, he damaged Giuliani's image enough in the general election, which he lost to Democrat David N. Dinkins. Four years later, Velella and Giuliani put aside their differences. Velella assigned Tosi to a key role as manager of Giuliani's Bronx campaign. Giuliani was narrowly elected mayor, ousting Dinkins.

== Controversy ==
In the late 1980s, Tosi began working at the New York City Board of Elections as the personnel director and director of labor relations. His role in restoring two Bronx school board candidates to the ballot in 1993 despite the fact that there was a question of the required number of signatures came under scrutiny.

Manhattan District Attorney Robert Morgenthau empaneled a grand jury to investigate charges of fraud in the 1993 school board of election. In 1995, the grand jury drew up a report on its findings, which was leaked to the press.

The grand jury found that Tosi may have "improperly interceded" with Vincent J. Velella, a commissioner at the Board of Elections and the father of State Senator Guy Velella, to consider the validation of two candidates to the ballot. Although the grand jury did not recommend any criminal charges be filed against Tosi and 10 other Board of Elections employees, it allegedly recommended that they be fired. A judge later sealed the grand jury report.

In 1995, Tosi resigned from the board. He then became the job-training director in New York State under Governor George Pataki. In 2000, Tosi, following a quadruple bypass open heart surgery, after his second heart attack in ten years, returned to the New York City Board of Elections as the deputy chief clerk and entered St. Joseph's Seminary and College, Dunwoodie, Yonkers, Westchester County in the New York Archdiocese Diaconate program.

== Bronx Republican Chairman ==
In 2004, Velella resigned as a State Senator and Bronx Republican Chairman after pleading guilty to a corruption charge. Members of the Bronx Republican County Committee first elected Tosi as the "interim" chairman, and several months later unanimously elected him Permanent Chairman. In his capacity, Tosi campaigned for the election of Assemblyman Stephen B. Kaufman to succeed Velella.

Members of the New York State Senate Republican Committee recruited Kaufman, a long-time Democrat, to run for the seat. In previous elections, Kaufman had the endorsement of the Bronx Conservative Party and had the reputation of being a moderate. To increase the chances of his election in a district that was becoming more Democratic, Kaufman sought both the Republican and Democratic nominations. If elected, Kaufman would caucus with the Republicans in the Senate and, in effect, allow them to keep the seat they held since 1966.

However, Assemblyman Jeffrey Klein challenged Kaufman for the Democratic nomination. A Republican challenger, John Fleming, a retired police officer, abandoned plans to run against Congressman Eliot Engel (D-NY) and challenged Kaufman for both the Republican and Conservative nominations.

On primary day, Kaufman lost both the Democratic and Republican primaries. He did win the Conservative nomination and also had the support of the New York State Independence Party. Kaufman stayed in the race as a spoiler, and Assemblyman Klein won the seat in the general election.

In 2005, Tosi coordinated the New York City Republican endorsement for reelection of Michael Bloomberg as Mayor. Tosi resigned as Bronx GOP Chairman as he completed his seminary candidacy and prepared for ordination as a Permanent Deacon in the Roman Catholic Church.

Joseph J. Savino, Velella's former deputy chief of staff, was elected the new chairman. Velella, who had completed his prison term, accused his two former employees, Tosi and Savino, of seizing control of the Bronx GOP illegally.

== Other ==
Tosi retired from the Board of Elections in 2006. He was ordained as a Permanent Deacon in the Roman Catholic Church where he served in his ministry until his death on December 4, 2017, at the age of 81, from congestive heart failure.
