= 1981 New York City Council presidential election =

- November 3, 1981
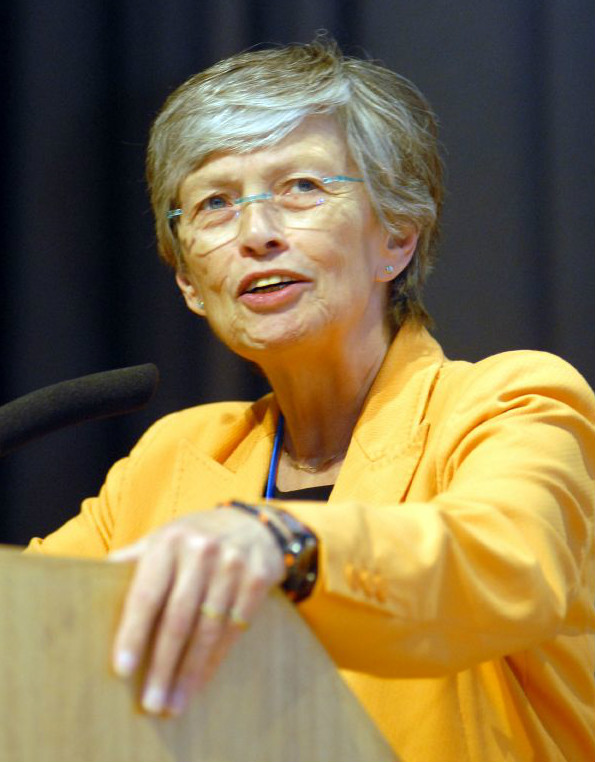

Nominee	Carol Bellamy	Guy J. Velella
Party	Democratic	Republican
Alliance	Liberal	Conservative
Popular vote	848,739	190,475
Percentage	79.6%	17.9%
President of the City Council before election
Carol Bellamy
Democratic
Elected President of the City Council
Carol Bellamy
Democratic

An election was held on November 3, 1981 to elect the President of the New York City Council. Democratic incumbent Carol Bellamy was re-elected to a second term in office over Republican Assemblyman Guy J. Velella.

== Democratic primary ==
=== Candidates ===
- Carol Bellamy, incumbent Council President since 1978

=== Results ===
Bellamy was unopposed in the September primary, and her name did not appear on the ballot. Manhattan Borough President Andrew Stein and his primary opponent David Dinkins both sought to tie themselves to the popular Bellamy.

== General election ==
=== Candidates ===
- Carol Bellamy, incumbent Council President since 1978 (Democratic and Liberal)
- Margaret T. Chiffriller, cook and housekeeper at Queen of Peace Roman Catholic Church in Kew Gardens Hills (Right to Life)
- Guy Velella, Assemblyman from the Bronx (Republican and Conservative)

=== Campaign ===
Bellamy, who won the presidency in an upset in the 1977 election, was broadly popular in 1981. Before even announcing her re-election bid, she stated, "I make no bones about wanting to run for Governor someday," and was critical of Governor Hugh Carey. The New York Times framed her campaign as a springboard to future statewide office. Villela conceded that his campaign was "a long shot", but claimed that Bellamy should be doing more to utilize the ombudsman responsibilities of the presidency.

Margaret T. Chiffriller, running on the Right to Life ticket, ran a single-issue advocacy campaign focused on opposition to abortion.

=== Results ===
1981 New York City Council President election (unofficial)
Party	Candidate	Votes	%
Democratic	Carol Bellamy (incumbent)	848,739	79.59%
Republican	Guy Velella	190,475	17.86%
Right to Life	Margaret T. Chiffriller	27,125	2.54%
Total votes		1,066,339	100.00%
