= John C. Dearie =

American politician

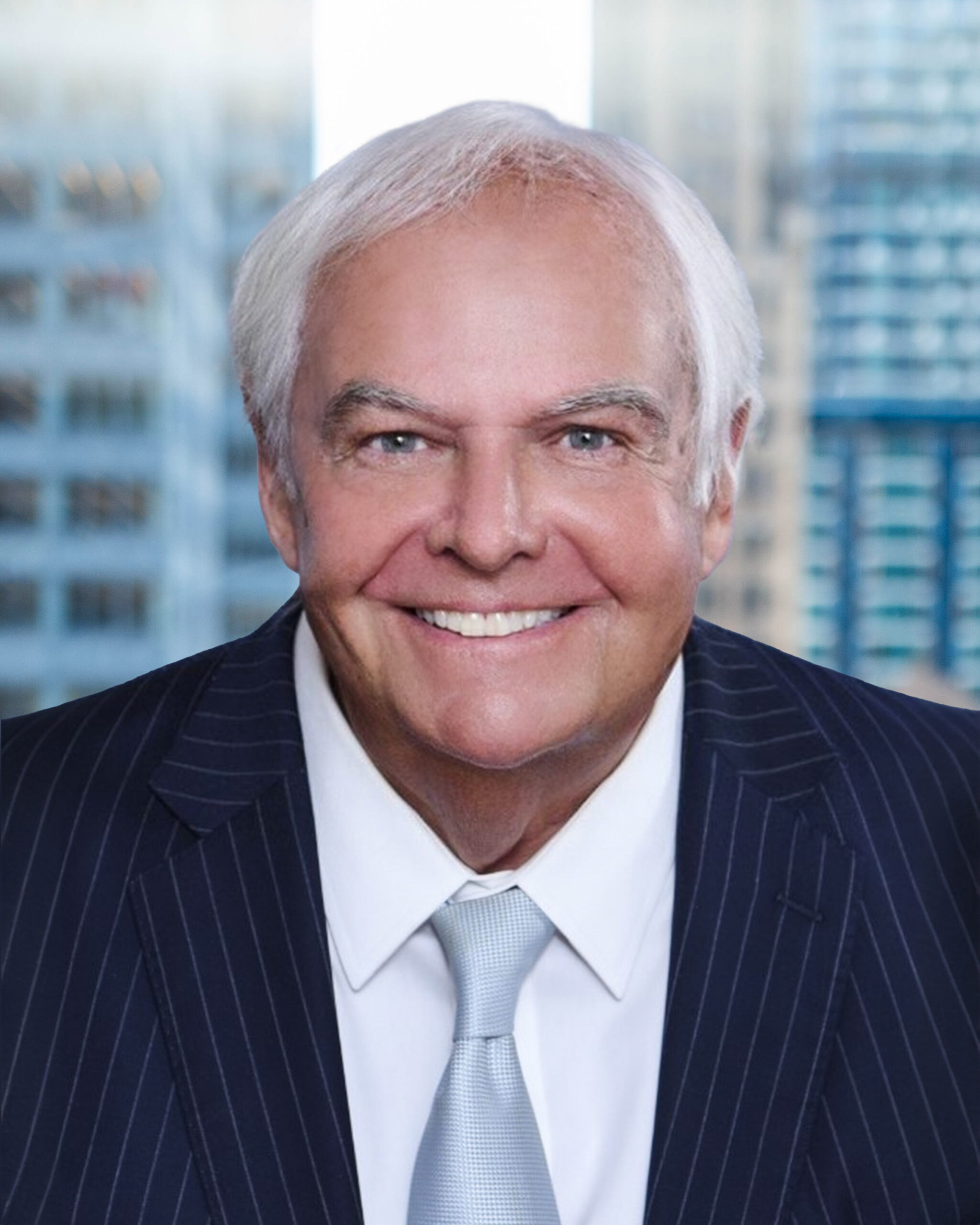

Member of the New York State Assembly from the 85th (1973–1982) 75th (1983–1992) district
- In office February 27, 1973 – 1992
- Preceded by: Anthony J. Mercorella
- Succeeded by: Hector L. Diaz

Personal details
- Born: March 23, 1940 (age 86) Parkchester, Bronx, New York, U.S.
- Party: Democratic
- Education: University of Notre Dame (BBA); Northwestern University (MBA); New York University School of Law (JD)
- Occupation: Lawyer

John C. Dearie (born March 23, 1940) is an American lawyer and politician... John C. Dearie (born March 23, 1940) is an American lawyer and politician from New York. He is most notable for his service in the New York State Assembly from 1973 to 1992.

== Early life ==
Dearie was born and raised in Parkchester, the son of Grace Beck Dearie Charles Edward Dearie. Federal judge Raymond J. Dearie is his first cousin. He graduated from Riverdale's Manhattan Prep High School, then attended the University of Notre Dame. Dearie earned an athletic scholarship and played forward on Notre Dame's basketball team. He graduated with a Bachelor of Business Administration degree in accounting in 1962, and in 1966 completed a Master of Business Administration degree in Finance and Marketing at Northwestern University. From 1969 to 1972, Dearie was a member of the staff at the United Nations Secretariat in New York City, where he coordinated conferences and aid programs. In 1985, Dearie completed his Juris Doctor degree at New York University School of Law. He was admitted to the bar in 1987 and started The Dearie Law Firm, P.C. that same year.

== Political career ==
Dearie entered politics as a Democrat. On February 27, 1973, he was elected to the New York State Assembly, to fill the vacancy caused by the resignation of Anthony J. Mercorella. He was re-elected several times, and remained in the Assembly until 1992, sitting in the 180th, 181st, 182nd, 183rd, 184th, 185th, 186th, 187th, 188th and 189th New York State Legislatures.

Dearie ran for New York City Comptroller in 1981, but was defeated by the incumbent Harrison J. Goldin in the Democratic primary. Shortly after, redistricting placed Dearie in the same district as Republican Guy Velella, which now covered Parkchester and Throggs Neck. Dearie defeated Velella in the 1982 election. Ten years later, after another re-apportionment in which his district was cut up, he decided to retire from politics, and focus on his legal practice instead.

== Law career ==
In late 2001, it was widely publicized that John C. Dearie's personal injury plaintiffs' firm (The Dearie Law Firm, P.C.) in the state of New York has been experimenting with bus-sized "mobile law offices." Dearie's penchant for mobility began years before as an Assemblyman when he took to creating outdoor district offices by setting up folding tables in parking lots and shopping malls instead of hearings in public-hearing rooms. As of 2014, there were three mobile law offices.

New York State Assembly
Preceded by Anthony J. Mercorella	New York State Assembly; 85th District; 1973–1982	Succeeded by John M. Perone
Preceded by José E. Serrano	New York State Assembly; 75th District; 1983–1992	Succeeded by Hector L. Diaz
