= Jerome Schutzer =

New York politician (1930–2021)

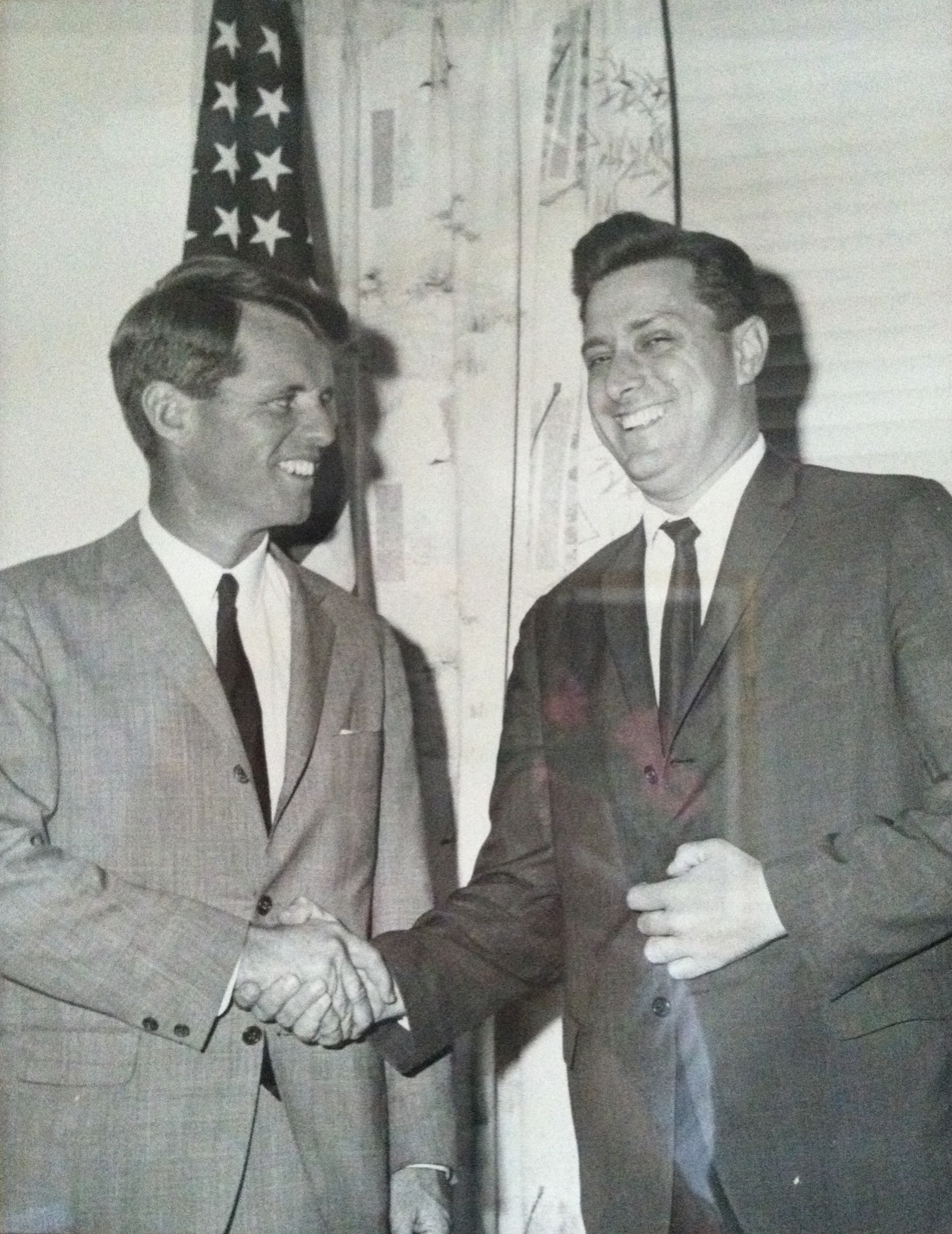
- Schutzer (right) campaigning with Robert F. Kennedy (left)

Member of the New York State Assembly from the Bronx County 3rd district
- In office 1961–1965

Member of the New York Senate from the 33rd district
- In office 1966

Personal details
- Born: New York City, New York, U.S. January 11, 1930
- Died: November 5, 2021 (aged 91) Wellington, Florida, U.S.
- Party: Democratic
- Relations: Morris Mohr (father-in-law)
- Education: City College of New York; Brooklyn Law School

Jerome Schutzer (January 11, 1930 - November 5, 2021) was an American lawyer and politician from New York.

== Life ==
Schutzer was born on January 11, 1930, in the East Bronx, New York City, the son of Louis Schutzer and Fannie (Luxenberg) Schutzer. He graduated from Stuyvesant High School in 1948; from City College of New York; and from Brooklyn Law School in 1953. In 1950, he married Harriet Mohr, daughter of Assemblyman Morris Mohr (1907–1956), and they had four children.

Schutzer was a member of the New York State Assembly (Bronx Co., 3rd D.) from 1961 to 1965, sitting in the 173rd, 174th and 175th New York State Legislatures.

He was a member of the New York State Senate (33rd D.) in 1966. His principal issues included rent control, Medicare for senior citizens, free tuition at City College of New York, and greater safety for school children. He ran under the campaign slogan "My position is no tuition". In 1966 after re-apportionment, he ran in the Democratic primary of the 30th District for re-nomination, but was defeated by Harrison J. Goldin.

Afterwards, Schutzer worked as Executive Assistant in the Public Affairs Department for The New York Telephone Company. In 1985, he was serving as Assistant Vice President-Legislative Counsel for the New York Telephone Company.

He and his wife Harriet, who were happily married for nearly 66 years, retired to their home in Wellington, Florida, in 1997. Jerome died on November 5, 2021, in Wellington, Florida, with his family at his side.

New York State Assembly
Preceded by Moses J. Epstein	New York State Assembly; Bronx County, 3rd District; 1961–1965	Succeeded by district abolished
New York State Senate
Preceded by D. Clinton Dominick III	New York State Senate; 33rd District; 1966	Succeeded by John D. Calandra
