= Jeffrey R. Korman =

American politician

Jeffrey R. Korman (born January 24, 1947) is an American politician from New York.

== Life ==
He was born on January 24, 1947. He attended Kingsbridge School (Public School Nr. 7), John Peter Tetard School (Junior High School Nr. 143), the Bronx High School of Science, Lehman College, and Empire State College at Albany.

He entered politics as a Democrat, and became an aide to Assemblyman George Friedman. In November 1982, Korman ran in the 34th District for the State Senate, but was defeated by Republican John D. Calandra.

On May 1, 1990, Korman was elected to the New York State Senate (33rd D.) to fill the vacancy caused by the death of Abraham Bernstein. He was re-elected in November 1990, and remained in the Senate until the end of 1992, sitting in the 188th and 189th New York State Legislatures. In September 1992, after re-apportionment, Korman ran for re-nomination in the 33rd District Democratic primary against Joseph L. Galiber, the incumbent from the old 31st District, but was defeated.

Afterwards he was a member of the District 10 School Board.

New York State Senate
Preceded by Abraham Bernstein	New York State Senate; 33rd District; 1990–1992	Succeeded by Joseph L. Galiber
