= Murray Lewinter =

American politician

Member of the New York State Assembly from the Bronx's 6th district
- In office January 1, 1961 – December 31, 1966
- Preceded by: Ivan Warner
- Succeeded by: District abolished

Personal details
- Born: December 12, 1926 The Bronx, New York City, New York
- Died: July 2, 2016 (aged 89) Queens, New York City, New York
- Party: Democratic

Murray Lewinter (December 12, 1926 – July 2, 2016) was an American politician who served in the New York State Assembly from the Bronx's 6th district from 1961 to 1966.

He died of Alzheimer's disease on July 2, 2016, in Queens, New York City, New York, at age 89.
