= Elias Karmon =

American businessman, philanthropist and community leader (1910–2008)

- Born: October 11, 1910; Lower East Side, New York, US
- Died: October 21, 2008 (aged 98)

Elias Karmon (October 11, 1910 – October 21, 2008), popularly known as Mr. Bronx, was an American businessman, philanthropist, and community leader in the Bronx during much of the 20th century. He made his living in the garment industry, running a retail clothing store in the South Bronx for 40 years. He later invested in Bronx real estate and was president of The Bronx Chamber of Commerce.

Karmon was involved with many community organizations in the borough including the NAACP, the YMCA, the Boy's Club and the Urban League and endowed a scholarship fund for CUNY students. He was a member of the Jackson Democratic Club and a major force in getting Black and Latino candidates elected to public office, most notably Walter Gladwin and Felipe N. Torres, who were the first black person and the first Puerto Rican from the Bronx, respectively, to serve in the New York State Assembly.

== Early life ==
Elias Karmon (né Kaminsky) was born on October 11, 1910, on the Lower East Side of Manhattan. His parents, immigrants from Eastern Europe, worked in the garment industry. He attended New York University, graduating in 1932 with a degree in Commercial Science.

After getting his degree, Karmon followed his parents into the garment industry, getting a job at a wholesale clothing business. The owner died soon after Karmon started working there whereupon Karmon purchased the business and took on a partner. The partnership quickly proved unsuccessful and the business failed. The pair then decided to open a retail clothing store in the Bronx but Karmon's partner backed out of the deal and Karmon opened Hollywood Clothes by himself. The store, located at 904 Prospect Avenue and East 163rd Street in the Morrisania section of the Bronx was opened in the late 1930s and remained in operation until the 1970s. Among the store's regular clients were jazz saxophonist Benny Carter and Colin Powell, who at the time was a student and ROTC member at City College, from which he graduated in 1985.

The 1960s and 1970s saw an epidemic of arson in the South Bronx. During that period, Karmon owned several buildings in the area and was involved in the community, visiting his buildings and getting to know the tenants. None of his buildings burned, which he attributed to "no magic, only hard work and perseverance".

== Community service ==
In addition to running the store, Karmon served in many positions of community leadership. For four years, from 1978 to 1981, he was the president of The Bronx Chamber of Commerce, also serving as Treasurer, and Vice President at various times. After the chamber faded from power in the 1990s, the Bronx was left as the only borough in the city without an organization representing their business community. Reflecting on this void, historian Fred Siegel commented:

You're talking about a borough of well over a million people ... The Bronx is largely bereft of a significant private-sector economy, that's what it says.

At the age of 92, Karmon worked with other business leaders and Bronx Borough President Adolfo Carrión Jr. to form a replacement organization which came to be known as the New Bronx Chamber of Commerce.

Karmon was one of the founders of the Ponce de Leon Bank in 1959, and served as board member emeritus until his death. He founded the Prospect Avenue Merchant's Association. Karmon was active in the Forrest Neighborhood House, the local branch of the National Association for the Advancement of Colored People, the Bronx YMCA, the Bronx Boy's Club, the East Bronx Community Council, the Council of Spanish American Organizations of Greater New York, South Bronx Kids, the Prospect Avenue Little League, the Mount Carmel Baptist Church, and the New York Urban League. Karmon was popularly known as "Mr. Bronx".

Karmon endowed the Bronx CUNY Scholarship Fund, which provides financial support for students in need at three schools in the Bronx: Lehman College, Bronx Community College, and Hostos Community College.

== Politics ==
Karmon was active in Democratic politics in the South Bronx. He was a member of the Jackson Democratic Club, which worked to elect black politicians. Karmon and the Jackson Democratic Club were instrumental in electing Walter Gladwin as the first black elected official from the Bronx and the first black member of the New York State Assembly. Karmon also supported the campaign of Felipe N. Torres, who was the first Puerto Rican from the Bronx to serve in the Assembly.

== Later life and honors ==
Karmon lived the last years of his life in the Pelham Parkway section of the Bronx, and continued to run his various businesses and real estate ventures in the borough and was known for throwing himself birthday parties which served as fund raisers for local cultural and social organizations. In May 2000, José E. Serrano and Eliot Engel both entered tributes into the Congressional Record honoring Karmon on the occasion his 90th birthday. Engle said "Elias Karmon’s accomplishments would scare lesser people. Even in his 90th year, he is not slowing down". Serrano called Karmon "an outstanding individual who has devoted his life to his family and to serving the community".

Karmon died on October 21, 2008, and was interred at the Cedar Park Cemetery in Paramus, New Jersey. The New York State Legislature passed a resolution honoring his memory, noting that "Elias Karmon was one of the Bronx's biggest advocates through both its darkest days as well as its renaissance". In 2014, the intersection of Thwaites Place and Barker Avenue was given the honorary designation of "Elias Karmon Way".
