= Joseph L. Galiber =

American politician (1924–1995)

Member of the New York State Senate
- In office January 1, 1969 – November 21, 1995
- Preceded by: Ivan Warner
- Succeeded by: Larry Seabrook
- Constituency: 31st district (1969-1972); 32nd district (1973-1982); 31st district (1983-1992); 33rd district (1993-1995)

Personal details
- Born: October 26, 1924
- Died: November 21, 1995 (aged 71) Manhattan, New York
- Party: Democratic

Joseph Lionel Galiber (October 26, 1924 – November 21, 1995) was an American politician from New York.

== Life ==
He was born on October 26, 1924, the son of Joseph F. Galiber and Ethel (Bowser) Galiber (1901–1997). During World War II he served in the U.S. Army as a staff sergeant, and took part in the Red Ball Express.

He played on the 1949–50 CCNY Beavers men's basketball team which won the 1950 NCAA Men's Division I Basketball Tournament and the 1950 National Invitation Tournament. He married Emma (died 1995), and they had two daughters. They lived in the Bronx.

Galiber was a member of the New York State Senate from 1969 until his death in 1995, sitting in the 178th, 179th, 180th, 181st, 182nd, 183rd, 184th, 185th, 186th, 187th, 188th, 189th, 190th and 191st New York State Legislatures. In 1973, he sought the Democratic nomination for New York City Comptroller, but was defeated in the primary by Harrison J. Goldin. On January 8, 1974, Galiber was chosen as Third Deputy Mayor of New York City. Because of questions arising from the financing of Galiber's campaign for City Comptroller, Mayor Abraham Beame postponed Galiber's appointment on January 10. On January 16, Beame withdrew the appointment of Galiber, and appointed Paul Gibson Jr. to the post instead. In 1979, Galiber sought the Democratic nomination for Borough President of the Bronx, but was defeated in the primary by the incumbent Stanley Simon. Galiber then ran in the general election on the New Alliance Party ticket, but was defeated again by Simon. Galiber was an alternate delegate to the 1984 and 1988 Democratic National Conventions.

He died on November 21, 1995, in Columbia-Presbyterian Medical Center in Manhattan.

New York State Senate
Preceded by Ivan Warner	New York State Senate; 31st district 1969–1972	Succeeded by Harrison J. Goldin
Preceded by Abraham Bernstein	New York State Senate; 32nd district 1973–1982	Succeeded by Israel Ruiz Jr.
Preceded by Israel Ruiz Jr.	New York State Senate; 31st district 1983–1992	Succeeded by Efrain Gonzalez
Preceded by Jeffrey R. Korman	New York State Senate; 33rd district 1993–1995	Succeeded by Larry Seabrook
