= Morris Mohr =

American lawyer and politician

Member of the New York State Assembly from the Bronx County, 3rd District district
- In office 1954–1956
- Preceded by: Edward T. Galloway
- Succeeded by: Moses J. Epstein

Personal details
- Born: 1907 New York City
- Died: September 21, 1956 (aged 48–49) 1345 Shakespeare Avenue, The Bronx, New York
- Spouse: Leah
- Children: 2
- Relatives: Jerome Schutzer (son-in-law)
- Education: Brooklyn Law School
- Occupation: lawyer and politician

Morris Mohr (1907 – September 21, 1956) was an American lawyer and politician from New York.

== Life ==
He was born in 1907 in New York City. He attended the public schools. He graduated from Brooklyn Law School in 1934. He married Leah, and they had two children.

In November 1953, Mohr was elected to the New York State Assembly (Bronx County, 3rd District), to fill the vacancy caused by the appointment of Edward T. Galloway as a City Magistrate. Mohr was re-elected in 1954, and remained in the State Assembly until his death in 1956, sitting in the 169th and 170th New York State Legislatures.

He died on September 21, 1956, at his home at 1345 Shakespeare Avenue in the Bronx, after an illness of four months.

== Personal life ==
He was Jewish. State Senator Jerome Schutzer (born 1930) is his son-in-law.

== Sources ==
New York State Assembly
Preceded by Edward T. Galloway	New York State Assembly; Bronx County, 3rd District; 1954–1956	Succeeded by Moses J. Epstein
