= Walter Gladwin =

American politician (1902–1988)

- Gladwin in 1954

Member of the New York State Assembly
- In office November 23, 1953 – October 31, 1957
- Preceded by: Louis Peck
- Succeeded by: Ivan Warner
- Constituency: 7th district

Personal details
- Born: October 21, 1902 Berbice, British Guiana
- Died: June 12, 1988 (aged 85) Goshen, New York, U.S.
- Party: Democratic
- Spouse: Anna
- Children: 4
- Education: City College of New York; New York Law School

Walter H. Gladwin (October 21, 1902 – June 12, 1988) was an American politician who served in the New York State Assembly from 1953 to 1957, as a member of the Democratic Party. He was the first black person to be elected to the New York State Assembly, be appointed an assistant district attorney or be named a criminal court judge in the Bronx; he also served in several other New York City government positions.

Born in British Guiana, Gladwin moved to the Bronx as a teenager and resided there until he retired and moved to upstate New York. He served in a volunteer capacity with the NAACP, the Bronx Chamber of Commerce, the Boy Scouts of America, and the Urban League, and other organizations. A park in the neighborhood where he served was renamed in his honor in 2020.

== Early life ==
Gladwin was born on October 21, 1902, in Berbice (spelled Verbice in some sources), British Guiana. He was orphaned while a teenager and moved to the Bronx to live with an uncle in 1925. He graduated from the City College of New York in 1936, and New York Law School in 1941, with a LL.B. degree. He earned money to pay for his education by working part-time jobs as a printer and elevator operator. Gladwin married Anna, with whom he had four children.

== Career ==
=== Legal and civic ===
Gladwin was admitted to the bar in 1942 and entered private practice at that time, maintaining an office at 391 East 149th Street in the Bronx. In 1943, he was named Deputy Collector of Internal Revenue for the Third District of New York, and in 1946, Assistant Corporation Counsel for the City of New York. On April 29, 1949, he was sworn in as Assistant District Attorney, under District Attorney Samuel J. Foley, where he served as chief prosecutor for the Court of Special Sessions and Magistrate's Court in the Bronx.

Gladwin was president of the Bronx chapter of the NAACP, director of the Bronx Chamber of commerce, and a member of the executive board of the Boy Scouts of America. In 1948 he was elected to be vice-chairman of the Bronx Committee of the National Conference of Christians and Jews, was on the board of directors for the Forest Neighborhood Houses, and was a member of the Equity Progressive Club. He worked toward peaceful race relations as the head of the Bronx branch of the Urban League.

=== Political ===
In the early 1950s, a number of political parties in New York City nominated black candidates: Andronicus Jacobs for Manhattan Borough President by the American Labor Party, Elmer Carter for the New York State Commission Against Discrimination by the Republican Party, and James Robinson by the Liberal Party. The Democratic Party nominated Gladwin under pressure from Ewart Gunier's Harlem Affairs Committee to respond to these events. Gladwin converted to Catholicism around this time; in her 2003 book To Stand and Fight, Martha Biondi explains that this was likely a political move, as Catholics held "considerable power in the New York Democratic Party". In 1956, he was a delegate to the state Democratic convention.

Louis Peck, a member of the New York State Assembly, resigned in July 1953, so that he could run for a seat on the New York City Council. With the support of Elias Karmon and the Jackson Democratic Club, Gladwin was elected in a special election to fill Peck's seat, winning 63% of the vote. He was reelected in 1954 (with 74%) and 1956 (with 69%), running in District 6 after district lines were redrawn. While serving in the assembly, he advocated for the U.S. Congress to withhold federal aid from states which did not comply with the Supreme Court's school desegregation order, saying "it would be a 'crime and disgrace' to tax Negroes living in New York State in order to support segregated school in the South". He was a member of the Black, Puerto Rican, Hispanic and Asian Legislative Caucus for all the years he was in the Assembly.

Charles A. Buckley submitted Galdwin for a judicial nomination in 1957. Mayor Robert F. Wagner Jr. appointed Gladwin to a judgeship in the New York Criminal Court serving in both the Bronx and Manhattan, where he became well known for presiding over the high-profile Adele Morales case. Ivan Warner was elected in a special election on January 14, 1958, to fill the assembly seat vacated by Gladwin. Gladwin was the first black person in the Bronx to serve in either the Assembly or as a criminal court judge, as well as being the first black assistant district attorney in the Bronx.

== Later life ==
Gladwin retired as a judge in 1972, after which he moved to Highland Mills, New York, where he resided for the rest of his life and was in private practice until 1983. He died of a heart attack at Arden Hill Hospital in Goshen, New York, on June 12, 1988.

== Walter Gladwin Park ==
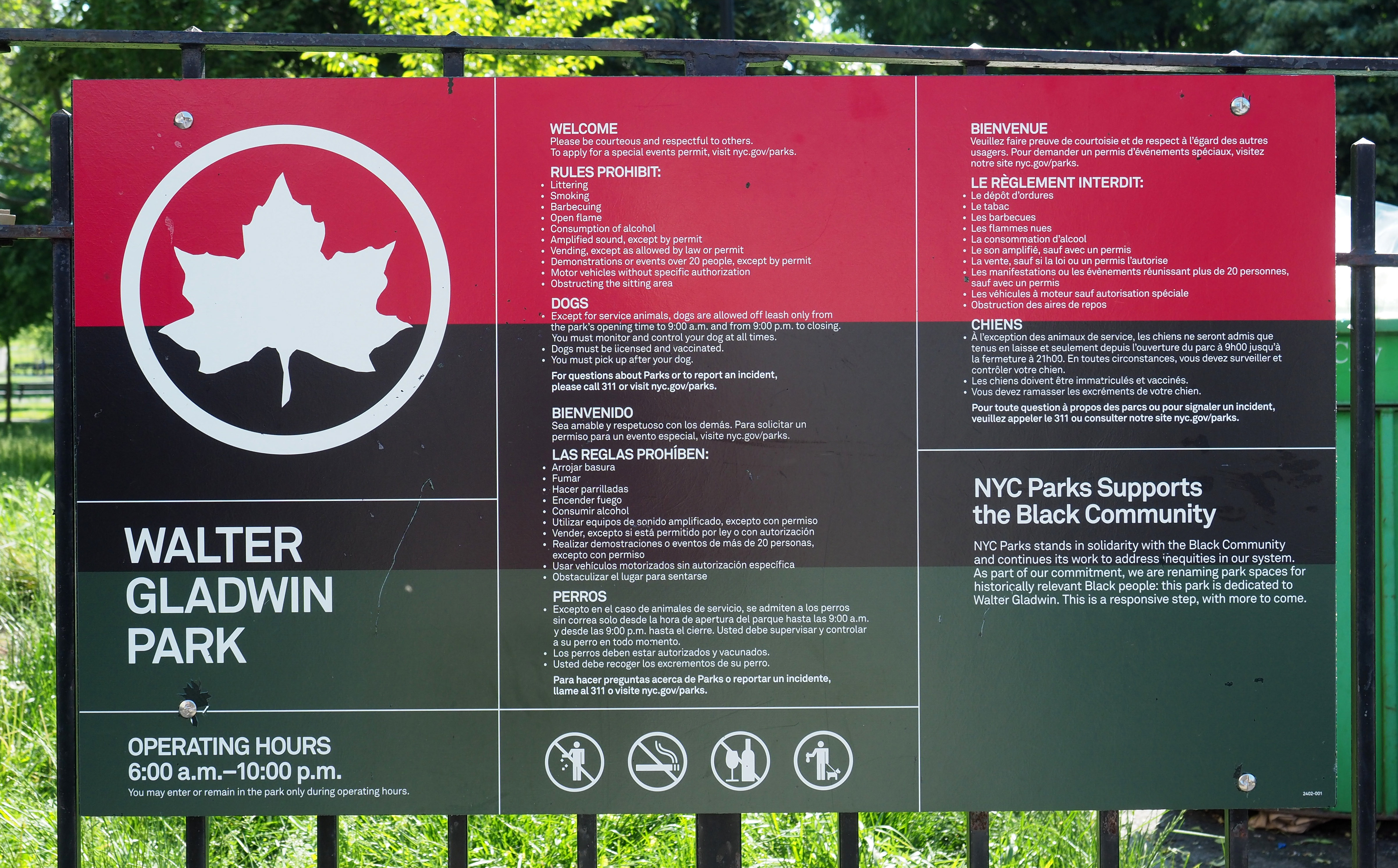
A Walter Gladwin Park sign (pictured in 2021)

In 2020, commemorating the 51st anniversary of Black Solidarity Day, the New York City Parks Department renamed Tremont Park as Walter Gladwin Park. The Parks Department noted that, "His legislative priorities included combating narcotics use among youth, improving housing for low-and middle-income constituents, strengthening civil rights guarantees and enforcement, and advocating for a state-sponsored summer camp program".

== See also ==
- List of African-American jurists

New York State Assembly
Preceded by Louis P. Peck	New York State Assembly; Bronx County, 7th District; 1953–1957	Succeeded by Ivan Warner
