= Crotona Park =

Public park in the Bronx, New York

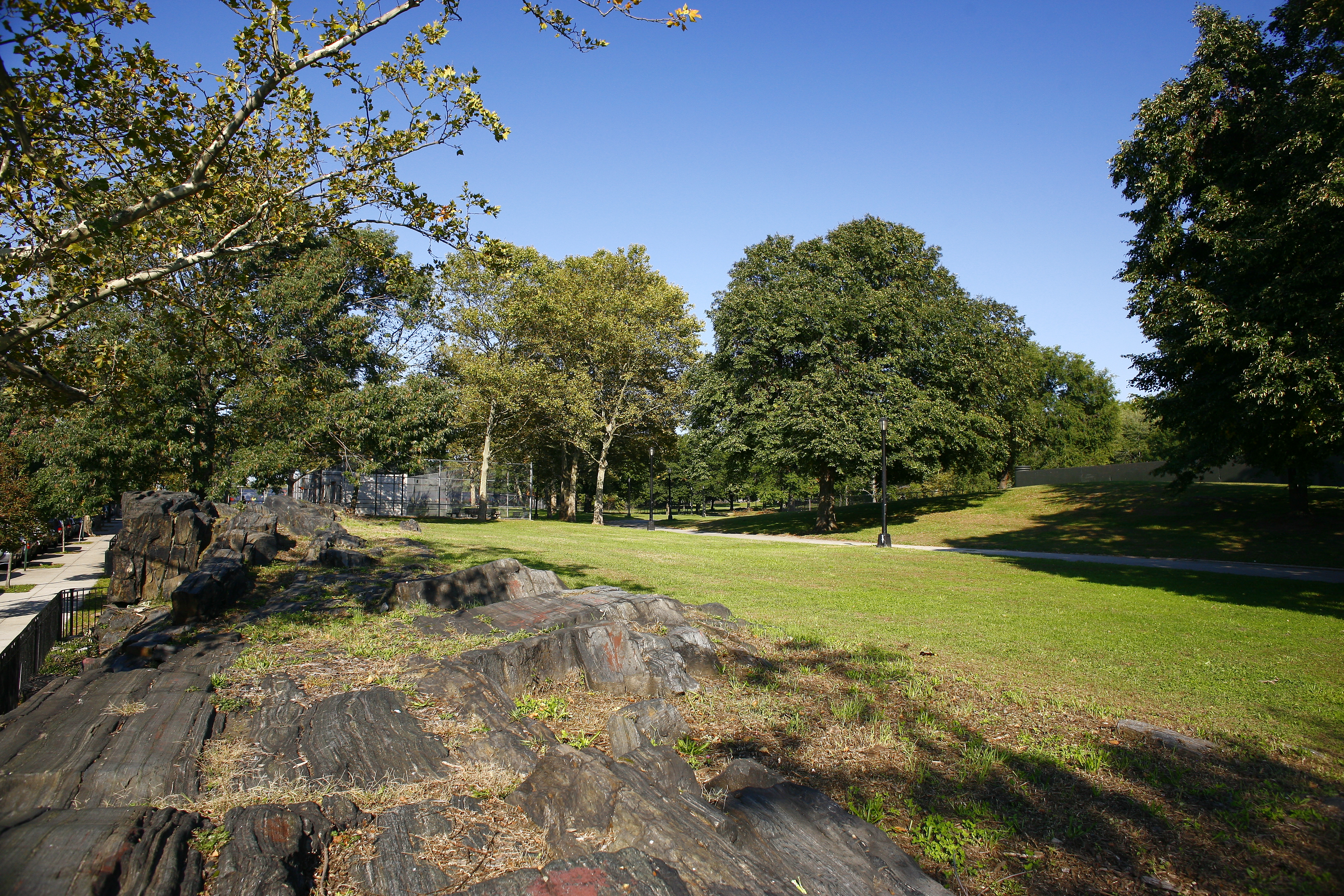
- Interactive map of Crotona Park
- Location: South Bronx, New York City, New York, U.S.
- Coordinates: 40°50′15″N 73°53′42″W
- Area: 127.5 acres (51.6 ha)
- Created: 1888
- Operator: New York City Department of Parks and Recreation
- Open: 7 a.m. to 10 p.m.
- Status: open
- Public transit: New York City Subway: 174th Street ( trains); New York City Bus: Bx11, Bx15, Bx17, Bx19, Bx21, Bx36 local buses

Crotona Park is a public park in the South Bronx in New York City, covering 127.5 acres (51.6 ha). The park is bounded by streets of the same name on its northern, eastern, southern, and western borders, and is adjacent to the Crotona Park East and Morrisania neighborhoods of the Bronx. It is divided into four portions by Claremont Parkway and Crotona Avenue, which run through it.

Crotona Park formerly belonged to the Bathgate family, a prominent landowning family in the South Bronx. It was created through the New Parks Act in 1888 as part of a boroughwide network of parks connected by parkways. The Crotona Play Center was added in 1936. Crotona Park was formerly 155 acres (63 ha), but the northern portion was cut off by the Cross Bronx Expressway in 1945, becoming what is now known as Walter Gladwin Park. After a period of deterioration in the late 20th century, several improvement projects were commenced starting in the 1990s.

Crotona Park includes a 3.3-acre (1.3 ha) lake, as well as numerous recreational facilities such as a swimming pool. The Crotona Play Center, a national and city-designated landmark, is in the western part of the park. The park is operated by the New York City Department of Parks and Recreation, also known as NYC Parks.

== History ==
=== Early history ===
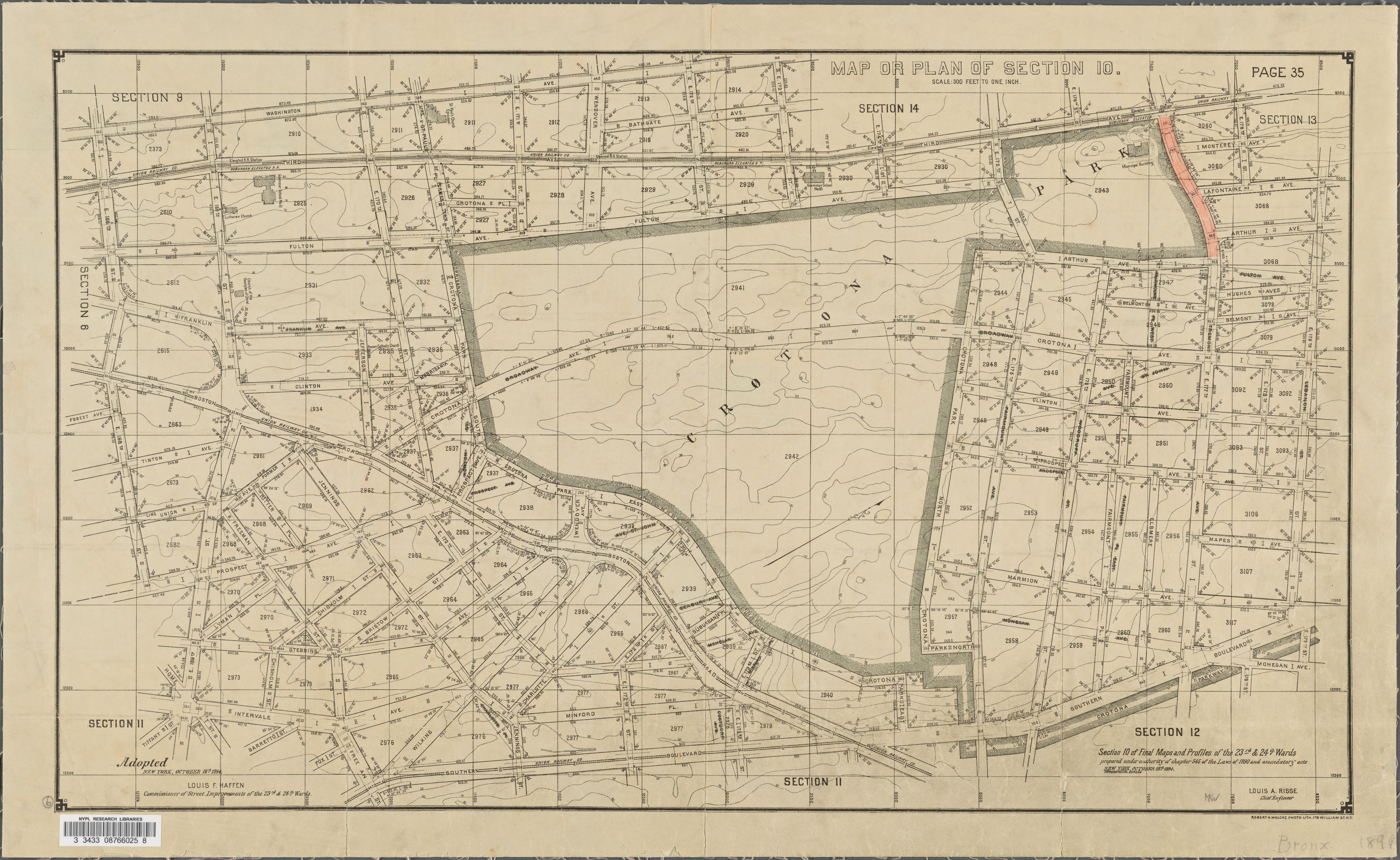
1894 Map of Crotona Park (west is at the top of the sheet). Note attached section (predating the Cross Bronx Expressway) at the north-west corner of the park, which is now Walter Gladwin Park. This map also predates the construction of Claremont Parkway.

In the 1870s, landscape architect Frederick Law Olmsted envisioned a greenbelt across the Bronx, consisting of parks and parkways that would align more with existing geography. This contrasted with Manhattan's grid system, laid out during the Commissioners' Plan of 1811, which had given rise to Central Park, a park with mostly artificial features within the bounds of the grid. However, in 1877, the city declined to act upon his plan. Around the same time, New York Herald editor John Mullaly pushed for the creation of parks in New York City, particularly lauding the Van Cortlandt and Pell families' properties in the western and eastern Bronx respectively. He formed the New York Park Association in November 1881. There were objections to the system, which would apparently be too far from Manhattan, in addition to precluding development on the parks' sites. However, newspapers and prominent lobbyists, who supported such a park system, were able to petition the bill into the New York State Senate, and later, the New York State Assembly (the legislature's lower house). In June 1884, Governor Grover Cleveland signed the New Parks Act into law, authorizing the creation of the park system.

Acquired in 1888 as a result of the New Parks Act, Crotona Park is on part of the former estate of the Bathgate family, which owned large plots of land in the South Bronx. Alexander Bathgate, a Scottish immigrant, had acquired the land from his employer Gouverneur Morris. At the time, the land comprising present-day Crotona Park was called Bathgate Woods, which was on a high point and contained woods and a pond called Indian Lake. The Bathgate family opened the area near Indian Lake to the public, and it became a picnicking spot. The Bronx Department of Parks, in its 1884 report to the state legislature, noted the land as having "indispensable requisites for a park", such as a "luxuriant growth of forest" with native oaks, elms, and magnolias, as well as proximity to railroad lines such as the Third Avenue elevated and the Harlem Line. Due to rapid urbanization, Bathgate Farm quickly became one of the few remaining greenspaces in the Bronx. When the Bronx Department of Parks acquired the parkland, it originally planned to name the now-public parkland Bathgate Park. Due to one park engineer's disagreements with the Bathgate family, it was named "Crotona", after the ancient Greek city of Crotone in what is now Italy, and to distinguish it from the nearby, similarly named Croton Aqueduct water system. The northernmost section of Crotona Park was known as Old Borough Hall Park due to the presence of Bronx Borough Hall in the park.

The park did not receive many improvements until the 20th century. Indian Lake's perimeter was paved in the early 1900s, and an ice-skaters' concession stand and a warming hut were installed. In addition, landscaping work was performed, and a new grandstand for concerts and ball games was erected. Three hundred American elms were planted around the lake in 1903. Two years later, an athletic field for the New York City Department of Education was built. A bill was introduced in the Assembly in 1909, which would install a New York National Guard armory in Crotona Park. The bill was heavily denounced by the public, and though both the Assembly and Senate passed the bill, mayor George B. McClellan Jr. vetoed it. Crotona Park was expanded via land acquisition in 1907 and 1911, and extra tennis courts were added in 1915. A concrete wall around the lake's perimeter, as well as lamps and paths, were installed in 1914. A "farm garden", to teach children about farming, was added in 1928.

By 1911, local landowners complained that the sporting events at the athletic field and bandstand were too loud. They requested that the field be moved further within Crotona Park. In 1916, several local landowners filed a lawsuit, calling the athletic field and bandstand "nuisances" that were not conducive to park operation. Some of these landowners alleged that they could not sell their property.

=== Works Progress Administration renovation ===
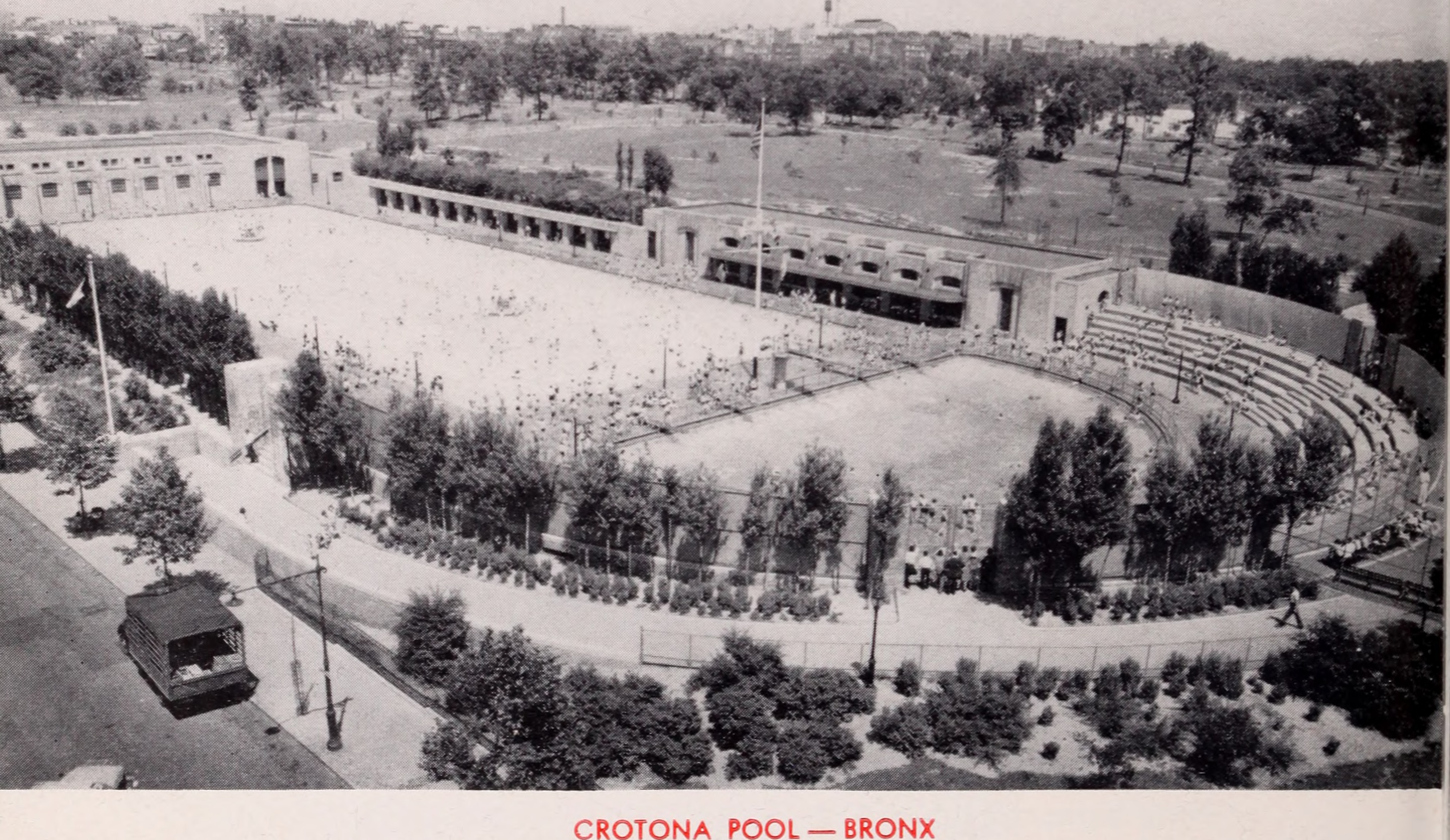
A promotional photograph of the pool at Crotona Park, from 1964

In 1934, mayor Fiorello H. La Guardia nominated Robert Moses to become commissioner of a unified New York City Department of Parks and Recreation. At the time, the United States was experiencing the Great Depression; immediately after La Guardia won the 1933 election, Moses began to write "a plan for putting 80,000 men to work on 1,700 relief projects". By the time he was in office, several hundred such projects were underway across the city.

Moses was especially interested in creating new pools and other bathing facilities, such as those in Jacob Riis Park, Jones Beach, and Orchard Beach. He devised a list of 23 pools around the city, including one at Crotona Park. The pools would be built using funds from the Works Progress Administration (WPA), a federal agency created as part of the New Deal to combat the Depression's negative effects. Eleven of these pools were to be designed concurrently and open in 1936. Moses, along with the architects Aymar Embury II and Gilmore David Clarke, created a common design for these proposed aquatic centers. Each location was to have distinct pools for diving, swimming, and wading; bleachers and viewing areas; and bathhouses with locker rooms that could be used as gymnasiums. The pools were to have several common features, such as a minimum 55-yard (50 m) length, underwater lighting, heating, and filtration, all constructed using inexpensive materials. To fit the requirement for efficiency and low-cost construction, each building would be built using elements of the Streamline Moderne and Classical architectural styles. The buildings would also be near "comfort stations", additional playgrounds, and spruced-up landscapes.

Plans for the construction of ten tennis courts, a new playground, and additional handball courts and baseball diamonds at Crotona Park were announced in May 1934. Construction for some of the 11 pools began that October. Of these, Crotona Park was the only location in the Bronx where a WPA pool would be constructed. A 110-foot-square (34 m) wading pool had opened to the north of the future bathhouse site by mid-1935. The blueprints for the Crotona Park pool and bathhouse were submitted to the New York City Department of Buildings that August. By mid-1936, ten of the eleven WPA-funded pools were completed and were being opened at a rate of one per week. The Crotona Pool was the seventh of these pools to open. (Note: The pools opened in the following chronological order: Hamilton Fish Park, Thomas Jefferson Park, Astoria Park, Tompkinsville Pool, Highbridge Park, Sunset Park, Crotona Park, McCarren Park, Betsy Head Park, Colonial Park, and Red Hook Park.) It opened on July 25, 1936, in front of a crowd of five thousand; according to The New York Times, about 10,000 would-be participants had to be refused entry. The center was composed of the 330-by-125-foot (101 by 38 m) main swimming pool, a bathhouse, and the wading pool to the north of the bathhouse.

In 1938, further improvements were announced for the 11 locations that had received new pools. About $2.87 million (equal to around $66 million in 2025) was allocated to the renovation of Crotona Park, including the sidewalks on the surrounding streets. NYC Parks started rebuilding the baseball and softball fields and the existing athletic field. Sometime in the 1940s, a brick boathouse was built along the lake to replace a previous wooden structure that had burned down. In 1941, NYC Parks announced the completion of these improvements. In total, seven playgrounds were added, three others were rebuilt, and a children's farm and two comfort stations were constructed. In total, between 1934 and the 1960s, NYC Parks added the pool and bathhouse, as well as five baseball fields, nine playgrounds, twenty tennis courts, four comfort stations, paths, and sitting areas.

=== Decline ===
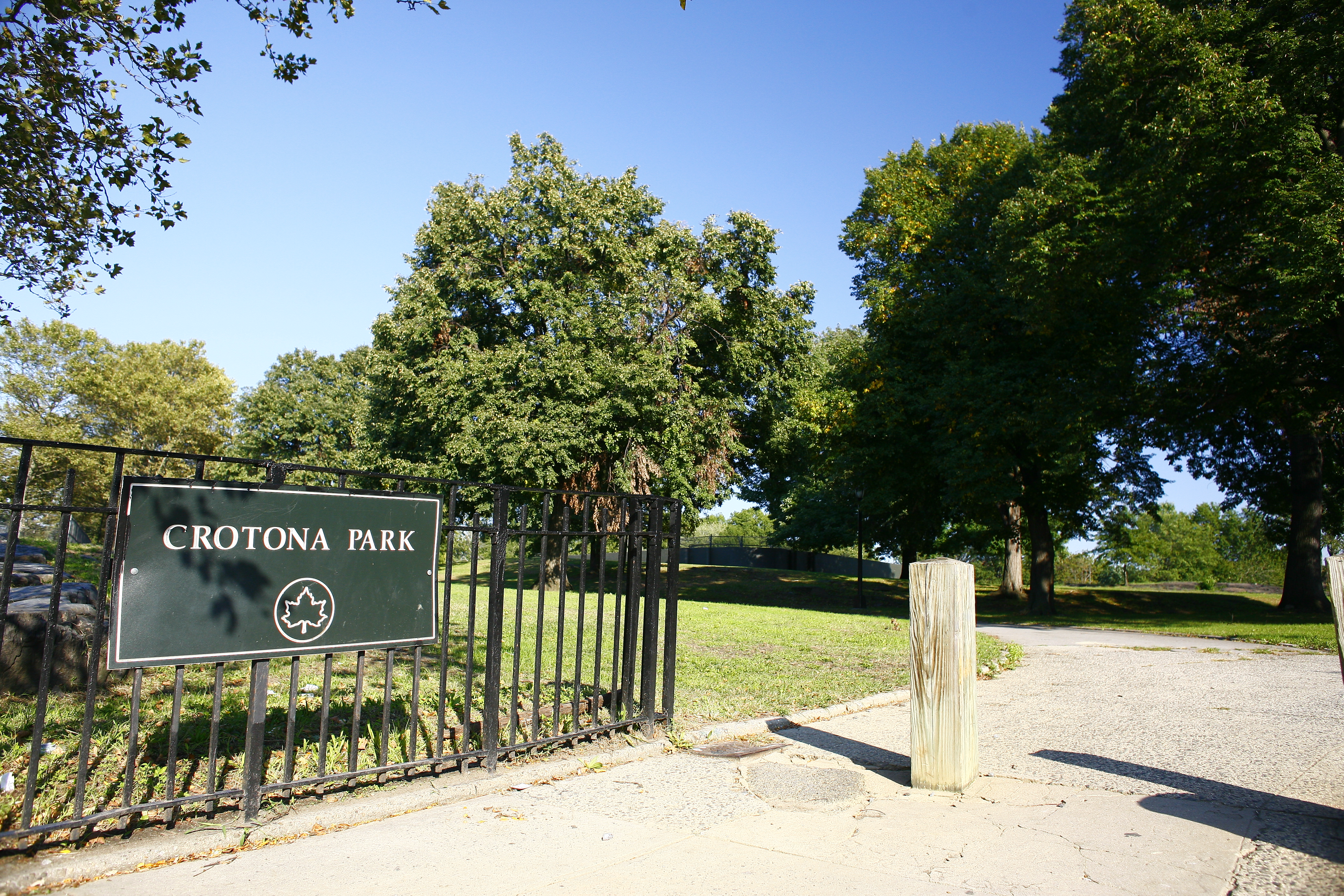
An entrance to the park

At its peak, Crotona Park encompassed 155 acres (63 ha) of land. When the Cross Bronx Expressway was built in the 1950s and early 1960s, the northernmost portion of Crotona Park was cut off from the rest of the park. The northernmost section was still known as Crotona Park until 1987, when it was renamed Highland Park. The name was changed to Tremont Park in 1999 and again, to Walter Gladwin Park, in 2020.

By the 1950s, Crotona Park had become the setting for several high-profile crimes, as gangs began to develop in the surrounding neighborhoods. Incidents included a thwarted battle between dozens of teenage gang members in 1950; a series of muggings at the park in 1954; the beating of a teacher in 1958; and the fatal stabbing of a teenager in 1965. Additionally, in July 1960, a six-year-old boy drowned in the Crotona Play Center's swimming pool. To deter crime, and especially in response to a murder in a poorly lit playground in Manhattan, Robert F. Wagner Jr. proposed replacing the lighting in Crotona Park and other city parks. The project was completed by 1963.

Restoration work in the Crotona Play Center was announced in 1965 as part of Wagner's plan to restore parks, playgrounds, and libraries around the city. Ultimately, these improvements did not occur, and many benches and water fountains were damaged without being replaced. The boathouse stopped offering boat tours in 1970. In early 1971, vandals stole multiple electric and plumbing fixtures from the play center, causing tens of thousands of dollars in damage. To deter future crimes of similar magnitude, the bath house's and filter house's windows were filled in. Nevertheless, the play center remained popular. In 1973, to determine the feasibility of completely renovating Crotona Park, the city performed a "blitz cleanup" with maintenance crews from all five boroughs. According to one official, such a cleanup had not been performed previously because NYC Parks officials were scared of being attacked by area teenagers. Around this time, surrounding portions of the South Bronx were being decimated by fire and crime. One particularly egregious example was Charlotte Street, directly southeast of Crotona Park, which by the late 1970s saw the demolition of almost every building along its three-block length.

=== Restoration to present day ===
==== 1970s and 1980s ====
By the 1970s, Crotona Park and other city parks were in poor condition following the 1975 New York City fiscal crisis. NYC Parks commenced a project to restore the pools in several parks in 1977, including at Crotona Park, for whose restoration the agency set aside an estimated $5.8 million. These projects were not carried out due to a lack of money. By March 1981, NYC Parks had only 2,900 employees in its total staff, less than 10 percent of the 30,000 present when Moses was parks commissioner. In 1982, the NYC Parks budget increased greatly, enabling the agency to carry out $76 million worth of restoration projects by year's end; among these projects was the restoration of the Crotona Park pool. Work had begun by early 1983, and the complex was closed for two summer seasons while construction was ongoing. The play center reopened on August 2, 1984.

During this era, other improvements were made to the park, including the restoration of the lake and boathouse, replacement of benches, and repaving of paths. In 1983, a volunteer ranger program was created to help maintain Crotona Park and other city parks. Some $500,000 in funding was provided by the federal government toward the rangers program. The nature rangers moved into the old boathouse in 1984, but a few years later, abandoned it after their funds had been depleted. In addition, three U.S. presidential candidates, Jimmy Carter, Ronald Reagan, and Bill Clinton, visited the park, while Pope John Paul II said mass there in 1979. This helped draw attention to Crotona Park as one of the only large green spaces in the South Bronx.

==== 1990s to present ====
Crotona Park pond, fall 2025

NYC Parks continued to face financial shortfalls in the coming years, and the pools retained a reputation for high crime. Crotona Park as a whole was also seen as an unsafe area. Violent crimes including the stabbing of a pregnant woman, a shootout that injured a child, and a man who was set on fire during a bike theft were all reported in the 1980s and early 1990s; in addition, a serial rapist reportedly frequented the park. For the summer of 1991, mayor David Dinkins had planned to close all 32 outdoor pools in the city, a decision that was only reversed after a $2 million donation from a trust created upon the death of real estate developer Sol Goldman and $1.8 million from other sources. Additionally, in the 1990s, a practice called "whirlpooling" became common in New York City pools such as Crotona Park, in which women would be inappropriately fondled by teenage boys. By the turn of the century, crimes such as sexual assaults had decreased in parks citywide due to increased security.

By the 1990s, there was a movement to revitalize Crotona Park, led by figures such as Elizabeth Barlow Rogers, who headed the Central Park Conservancy's effort to revive Central Park in the preceding years. In 1996, an organization called the Friends of Crotona Park was established. The two pools adjacent to the main pool were both infilled in the late 20th century. The diving pool was infilled in 1995 while the rectangular wading pool was modified into a hexagonal shape after the 1980s before being filled in by 1996. In 1999, the Lila Wallace Reader's Digest Fund allocated $1.1 million to the restoration of five city parks including Crotona Park, to be matched by funds from the city.

The park's nature center was reopened in May 2001, at which point a "restoration and management plan" was created for the park, which envisioned Crotona Park as a greenspace linking the surrounding communities. In 2009, the lake was restored and a new performance amphitheater was opened. A rehabilitation of the nature center was approved in 2014, and the Cary Leeds Center for Tennis & Learning opened near Indian Lake in 2015, with a new two-story clubhouse and twenty restored tennis courts. NYC Parks also released a master plan for Crotona and Tremont Parks in June 2015. The plan called for the construction of a cafe, dog run, and skate park in Crotona Park, as well as the construction of connections between the parks. The boathouse was restored in 2016. A renovation of the entrance to the Crotona Play Area was announced at that time, and the lanterns atop the main entrance towers were restored in 2020. The next year, NYC Parks proposed reconstructing the roof of the Crotona Park bathhouse.

== Attractions and facilities ==
Street map of the surrounding area

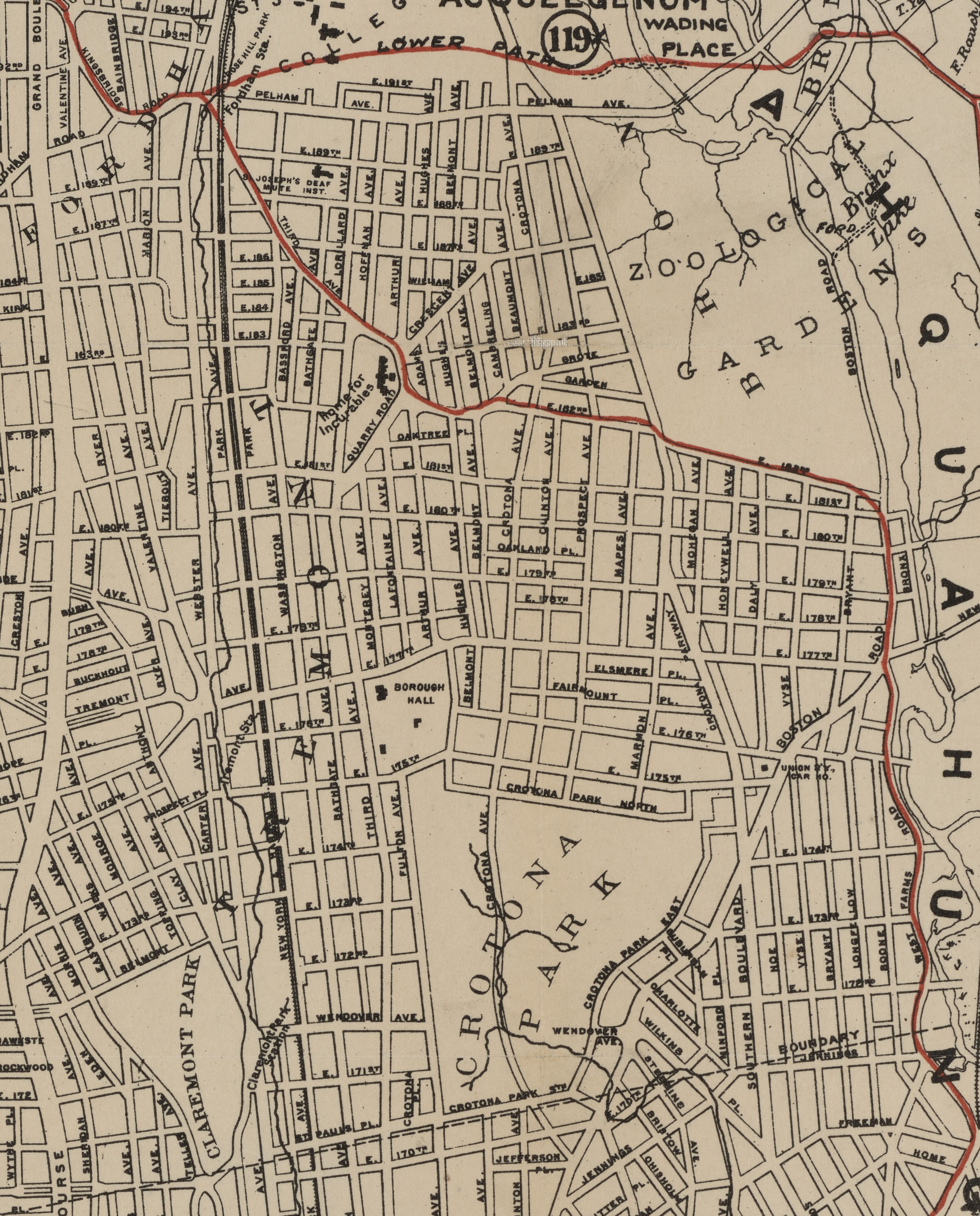
1912 map showing Crotona Park with Borough Hall Park (now called Walter Gladwin Park) directly adjacent across East 175th Street. Claremont Park to the west and Bronx Park ("Zoological Gardens") to the northeast. This map predates the Cross Bronx Expressway, which now separates Crotona and Walter Gladwin parks. Claremont Parkway, which now bisects Crotona Park at the level of Wendover Ave had also not yet been built.

Crotona Park is bounded by Crotona Park West (also known as Fulton Avenue), Crotona Park North, Crotona Park East, and Crotona Park South (a continuation of St. Paul's Place). It is divided into four sections of unequal size by Claremont Parkway and Crotona Avenue. The park serves the neighborhoods of Claremont to the west, Belmont and Tremont to the north, West Farms to the northeast, Crotona Park East to the southeast, and Morrisania to the southwest. Due to its central location between several different neighborhoods, Crotona Park is sometimes known as the "Central Park of the South Bronx". Crotona Park also contains connections to Hylan Park and Crotona Parkway at the northeast corner and Walter Gladwin Park near the northwest corner, though connections to all three are poor.

Crotona Park contains 28 species of trees, as well as the Crotona Pool, the largest in the Bronx. A series of asphalt paths crosses the park, connecting its different features. Among the trees are an American Elm and a Green Ash that were designated Great Trees of New York City in 2024 by the New York City Department of Parks and Recreation.

=== Recreational facilities ===
==== Playgrounds ====
Crotona Park contains twelve playgrounds:

- Bathgate Playground, at the intersection of Fulton Avenue and 173rd Street, in the park's northwest section. It is named for the Bathgate family.
- Boxcar Playground, at the intersection of Crotona Park East and Charlotte Street, in the park's eastern section.
- Carter Playground, at the intersection of Crotona Park East and Charlotte Street, in the park's eastern section. Originally named Playground #7, it was named for U.S. president Jimmy Carter in 1998.
- Clinton Playground, on Crotona Park South between Clinton and Prospect Avenues, in the park's southwest section. It is named for governor DeWitt Clinton.
- Hill & Dale Playground, at the intersection of Crotona Park East and 173rd Street, in the park's eastern section.
- Martin Van Buren Playground, on Crotona Park East between Prospect Avenue and Claremont Parkway, in the park's southeast section. It is named for U.S. president Martin Van Buren.
- Playground of the Stars, at Fulton Avenue between St. Pauls Place and 171st Street, in the park's southwest section. It is named after four constellations engraved near the park's spray fountain: Cetus, Cygnus, Ursa Major, and Canis Major.
- Playground 1, at the intersection of Crotona Park North and Crotona Avenue.
- Playground 3, at Crotona Park North between Marmion Avenue and Waterloo Place, in the park's northeast section.
- Playground 4, at Crotona Park East between Waterloo Place and 173rd Street, in the park's northeast section.
- Playground 11, at Fulton Avenue between Claremont Parkway and 172nd Street, in the park's northwest section.
- Prospect Park, at Crotona Park North between Prospect and Marmion Avenues, in the park's northeast section.

==== Recreation fields ====
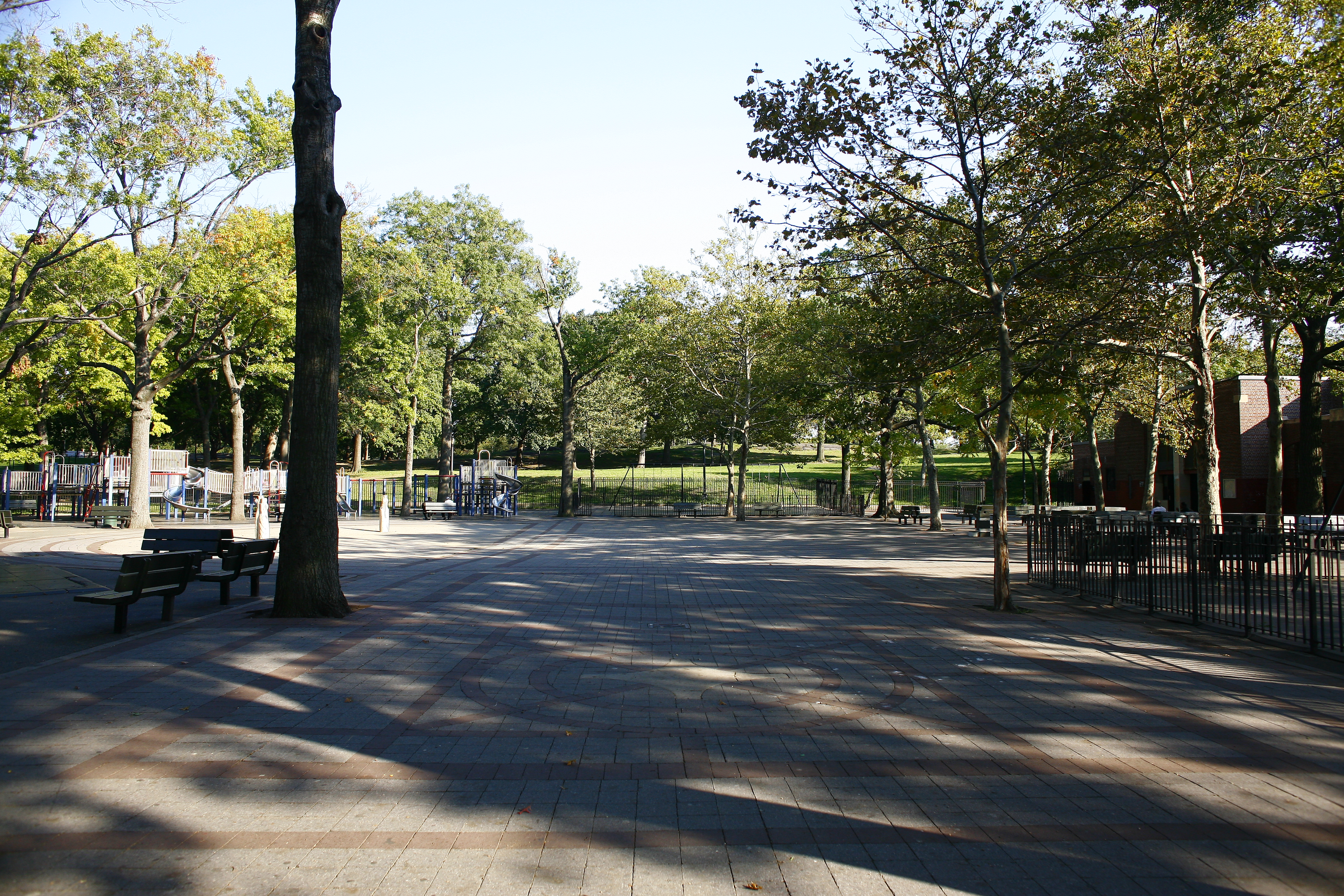
One of the play areas at Crotona Park

Crotona Park includes several sporting fields. Within the namesake recreation center, there is an indoor basketball court, a gymnasium, and a community center. Outdoors, there are numerous basketball courts, handball courts, soccer fields, and baseball fields scattered throughout the park. The southern shore of Crotona Park's pond contains a baseball field, two basketball courts, and four handball courts. The northeast corner of the park contains another two basketball courts, eight handball courts, and a soccer field. The northern shore of the pond contains two baseball fields and a basketball court, as well as the Cary Leeds Center for Tennis and Learning, with twenty tennis courts. Across Claremont Avenue to the west is the Crotona Play Center, where there are two baseball fields (one to the north and the other to the south), as well as a basketball court and two handball courts to the south. There is yet another basketball court at the northwest corner of Crotona Park South and Claremont Parkway, and a baseball field at the northeast corner of the same intersection.

In total, there are six baseball fields, seven basketball courts, one soccer field, twenty tennis courts, and fourteen handball courts. The outdoor fields are free for use by the general public, but some indoor activities require a membership.

==== Hylan Park ====
Hylan Park is a 15-acre (6.1 ha) sitting area at the northeast corner of Crotona Park. Named after mayor John Francis Hylan, it is bounded by 175th Street to the north, Southern Boulevard to the east, Crotona Park East to the south and southwest, and Waterloo Place to the west.

==== Walter Gladwin Park ====
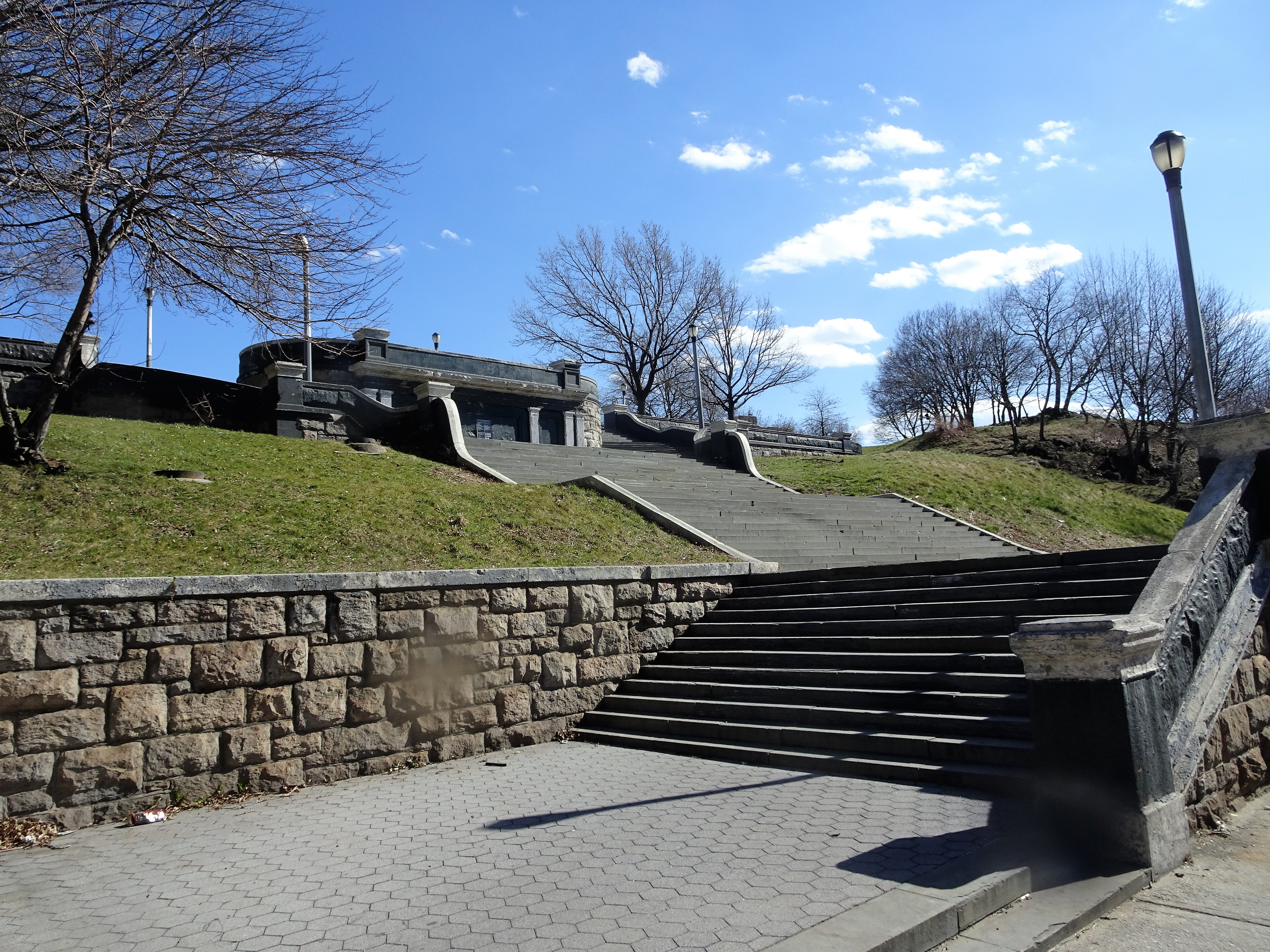
Walter Gladwin Park's grand staircase, seen from Third Avenue

Walter Gladwin Park is a 15-acre (6.1 ha) park just north of Crotona Park's northwestern section, separated from it by the Cross Bronx Expressway. It is named after Walter H. Gladwin (1902–1988), who was the first Black person elected to a Bronx government office. This area has been called Tremont Park, Highland Park and Old Borough Hall Park at various times; before that, it was part of Crotona Park. The park is bounded by Tremont Avenue to the north, Arthur Avenue to the east, 175th Street to the south, and Third Avenue to the west. The park was renovated in 1995 and includes basketball courts, a baseball field, playgrounds, showers, and chess tables. The park was renamed for Gladwin in November 2020; immediately prior to that, it was known as Tremont Park.

The park's most significant features are the steps to the former Bronx Borough Hall site and the circular paths around a former fountain site. The Borough Hall building, constructed in 1897, was "an ornate Italianate edifice on a prominent ridge in the park's northwestern corner to serve as the area's seat of governmental power". The stone staircase was built two years later. When the Bronx County Courthouse was built in 1931, the borough offices moved to 161st Street and the old borough hall was repurposed for municipal office space. The building was demolished in 1969.

As of 2024, plans are being developed to build a Walter Gladwin Recreation Center in northern portion of the park, fronting on Tremont Avenue. It would include a media lab, a dance studio, cardio and strength training facilities, classrooms, and a gymnasium with pickleball, volleyball, and basketball courts in three buildings connected by a common lobby totaling over 38,000 square feet (3,500 m^{2}). Construction is slated to start in March 2025 with a 2027 completion target. The project is one of seven chosen by the New York City Economic Development Corporation to receive grants from their Mass Timber Studio program supporting environmentally friendly mass timber construction.

=== Geographical features ===
Crotona Park is on a high point in the Bronx. According to the New York City Department of Parks and Recreation, on clear days, one can see the Hudson River Palisades to the west and the Brooklyn Bridge to the south from certain points in the park.

==== Lake and nature center ====
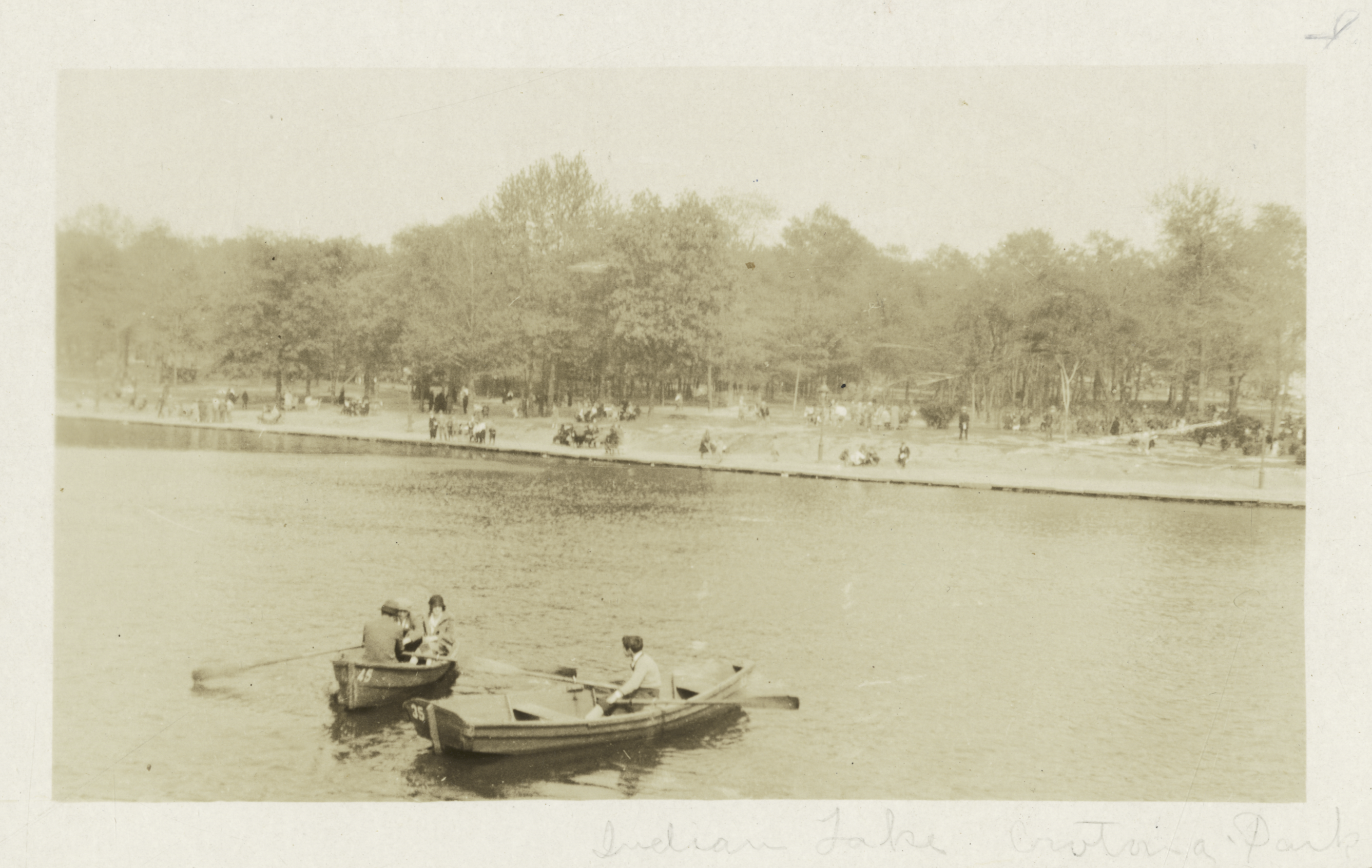
An early photo of Indian Lake

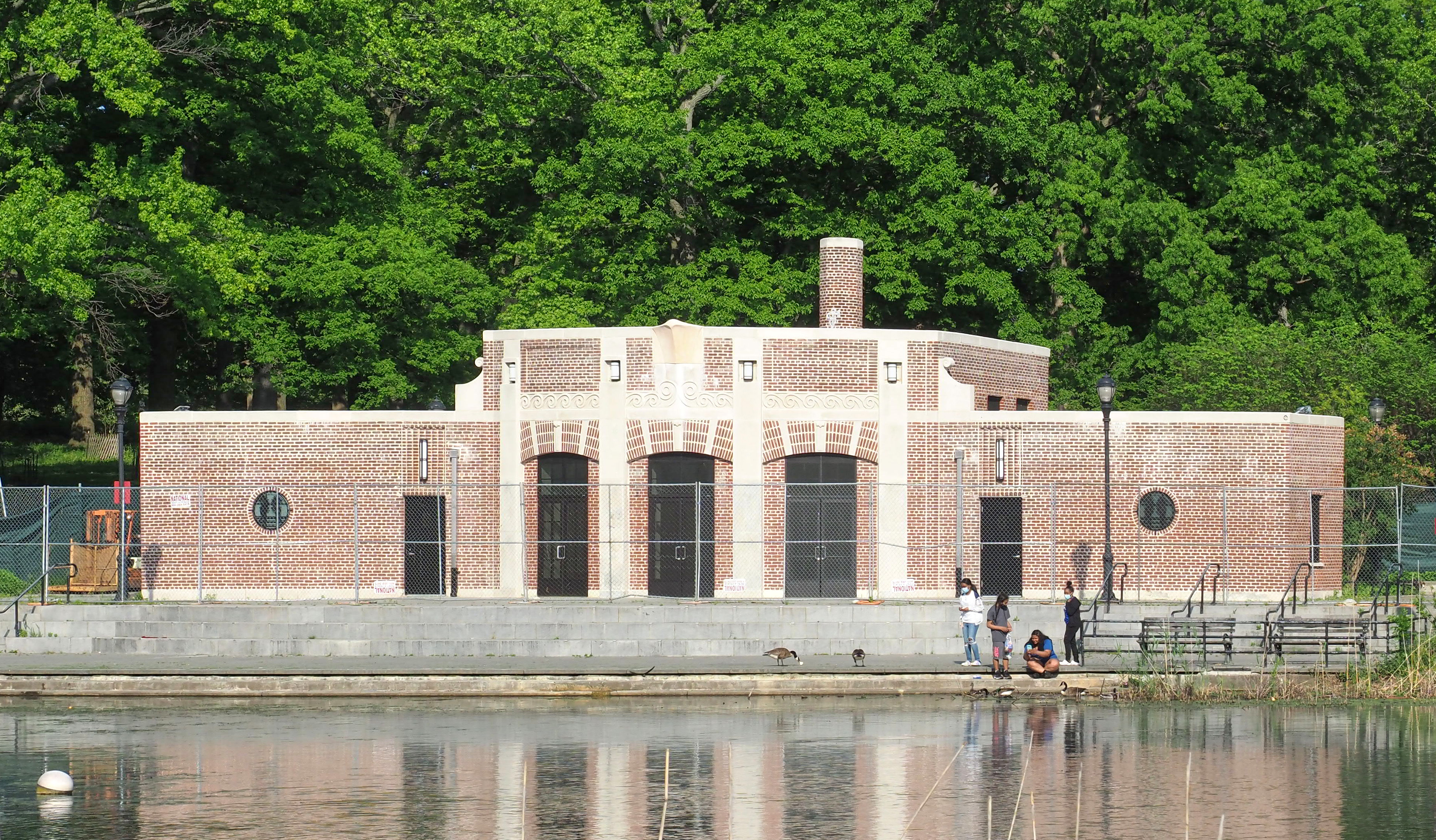
Nature center. At the time of this photo, the building was surrounded by temporary fencing during renovations.

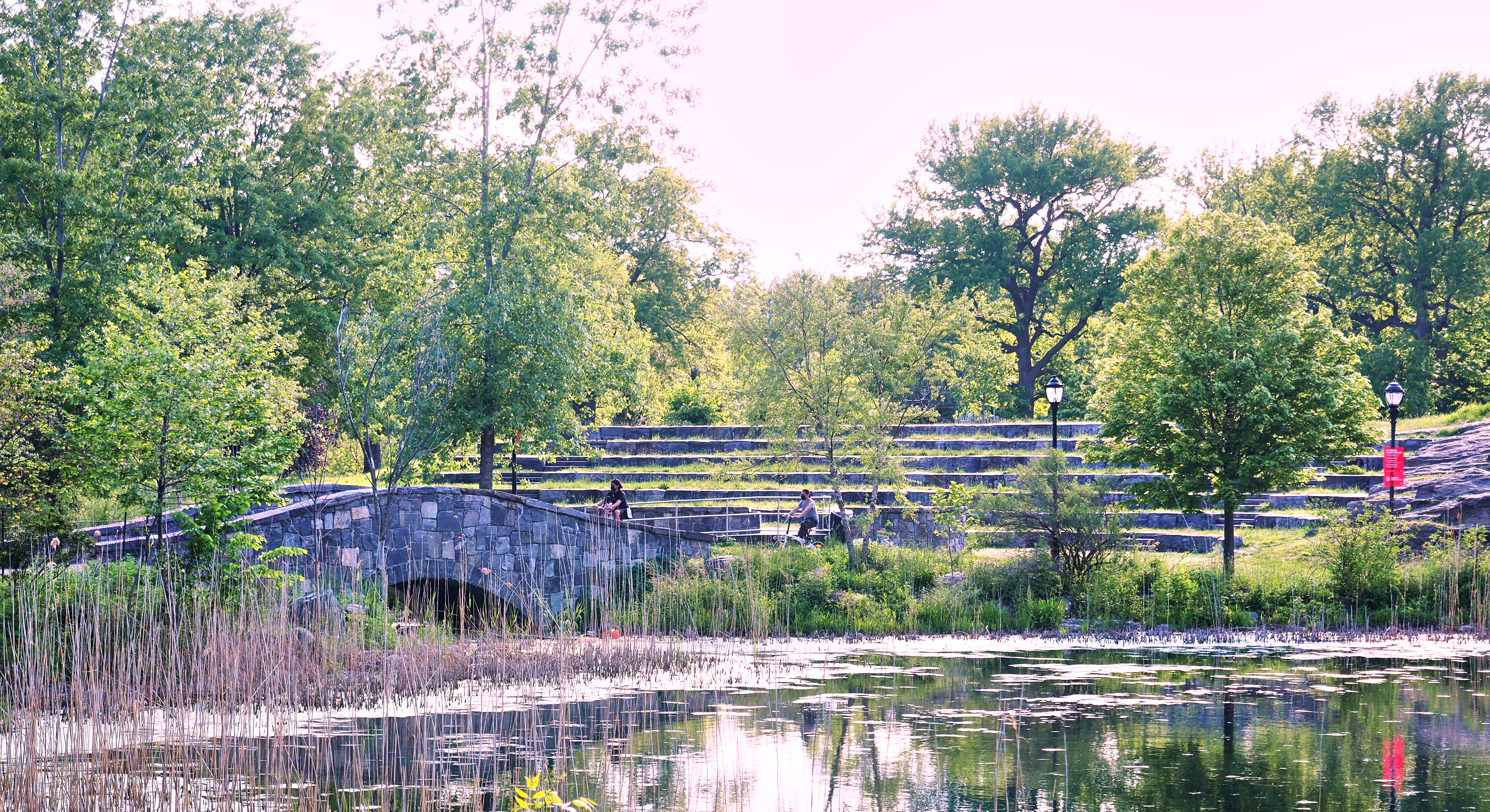
Stone bridge and amphitheater at south end of Indian Lake

Crotona Park contains a 3-acre (1.2 ha) pond called Indian Lake. According to NYC Parks, the name supposedly comes from 19th-century youths who lived in the area and "envisioned Weckguasgeeck Indians sitting around the lake on the ledge of the rock surrounding their chief, who would be smoking the legendary peace pipe with newly-arrived Europeans seeking land to settle". The pond is also popularly called Crotona Lake. Historically, Indian Lake drained into Bungay or Bound Brook, which then flowed south to the East River near what is now Hunts Point. An amphitheater is at the southern shore of the lake, adjacent to a stone bridge that spans an inlet at the lake's extreme south end. The lake is inhabited by ducks, turtles, and fish. The surrounding area contains numerous native floral species including tulip, black cherry, hickory, sassafras, and sweetgum. As of the 2015 master plan, the lake had become overgrown with algal blooms and contained excessive litter due to its proximity to picnic areas.

Adjoining the lake's eastern shore is a nature center, a brick structure that opened in 2001 and formerly served as a boathouse. The boathouse was built in either 1928 or the 1940s, replacing a wooden structure erected in the early 20th century. The nature center sponsors outdoor activities such as nature walks, species identification, and summer camps.

=== Crotona Play Center ===
- Crotona Play Center
- U.S. National Register of Historic Places
- New York City Landmark
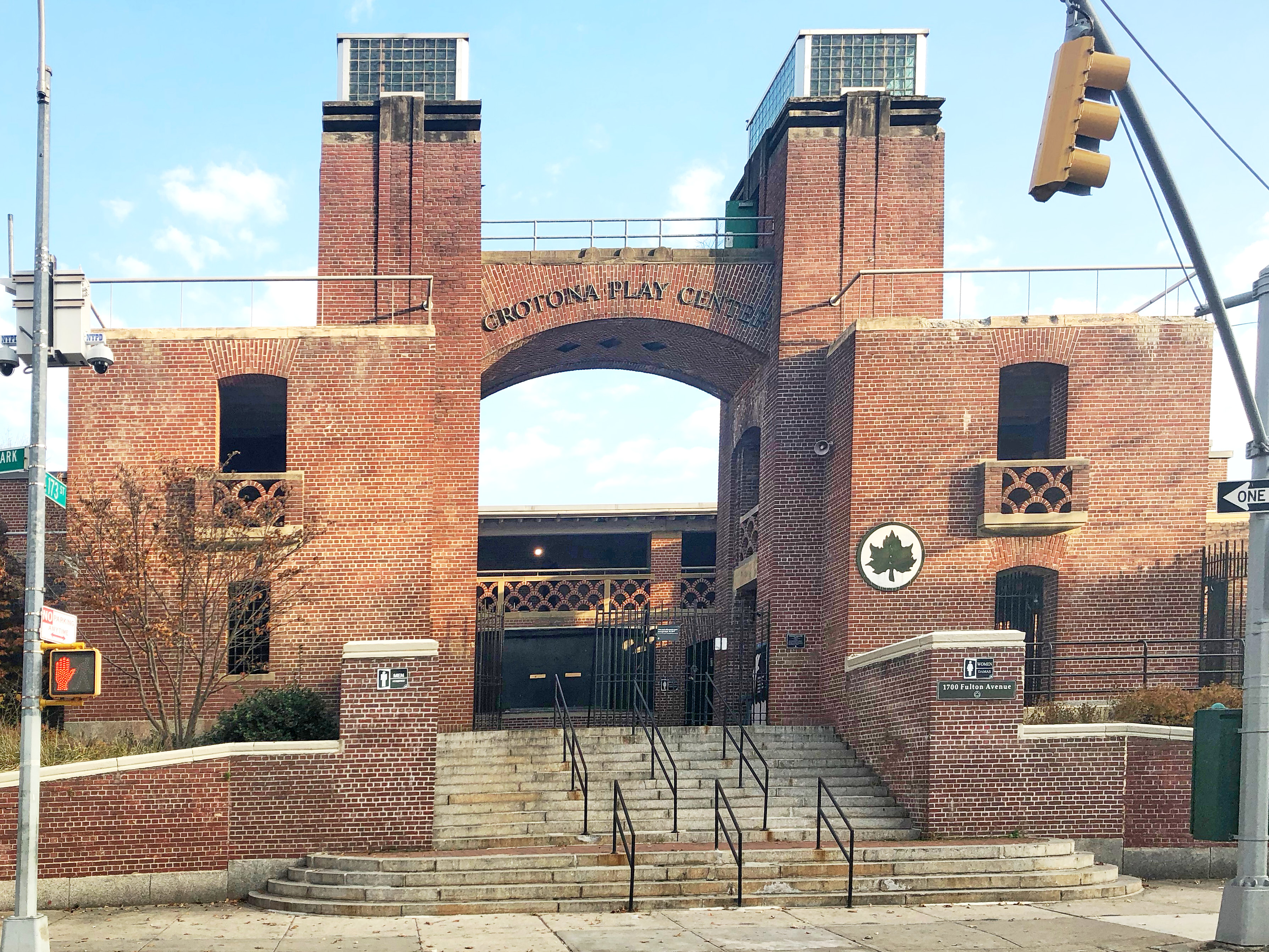
- Crotona Play Center

- Location within New York City Location within New York Location within the United States
- Location: 1700 Fulton Ave, Bronx, New York
- Coordinates: 40.8399°N 73.8981°W
- Area: 9.32 acres (3.77 ha)
- Built: 1934 – 1936
- Architects: Herbert D. Magoon; Aymar Embury II; Gilmore David Clarke
- Architectural style: Art Moderne
- NRHP reference No.: 15000177
- NYCL No.: 2232, 2233

Significant dates
- Added to NRHP: April 28, 2015
- Designated NYCL: June 26, 2007

Crotona Play Center, in Crotona Park's northwestern quadrant, is the only swimming pool complex built by the Works Progress Administration in the Bronx. Its main entrance is accessed from Fulton Avenue and 173rd Street, which provides access to the bathhouse and pool deck. The play center covers 9.32 acres (3.77 ha) and includes a bathhouse that separates the main pool and the former wading pool. The interior of the bathhouse contains mirror-image locker rooms. The complex was designed by Embury and Clarke with Herbert D. Magoon, whose plan combines Art Moderne and Modern Classical elements. The primary buildings are decorated with sculptures by Frederick Roth, including ibis-topped pilasters on the bathhouse and bas-reliefs in the sitting niches which are adjacent to the pool.

On June 26, 2007, the New York City Landmarks Preservation Commission designated the interior and exterior of the Crotona Play Center as official city landmarks. The commission had also considered the pool for landmark status in 1990, along with the other ten WPA pools in the city. Additionally, the play center was listed on the National Register of Historic Places on April 28, 2015.

==== Bathhouse ====
The main entrance contains a stair, spanned by a very large arched brick gateway overlooked by towers with glass-block skylights. There are lanterns within the skylights atop each tower. Along the arch are bronze letters spelling crotona play center. A cornerstone at the base of the north tower reads a.d. 1936. The stairway contains brick sidewalls. At the top of the stair is a brick courtyard which is enclosed by a two-story structure with a second story balcony. In the entrance foyer just east of the courtyard, there were booths that sold tickets for the bathhouse; the ticket booths are now closed since the bathhouse is free to use. An overpass projects from the southern facade of the courtyard building, connecting to a brick first-aid station.

To the east of the courtyard is a rectangular building with two nearly identical pavilions to the north and south. The longer side is on a west–east axis (i.e. parallel to 173rd Street), while the shorter side is on a north–south axis (i.e. parallel to Fulton Avenue). The building contains a brick facade with semicircular-patterned and cast stone details. The northern pavilion houses the men's locker room while the southern pavilion houses the women's locker room. The western facades of both pavilions contain brick-arched window openings at ground level; the north pavilion has a balconet on the second floor, though the south pavilion has a full-height opening. The northern and southern facades each contain seven bays. Each bay contains arched windows on the first floor, and a pair of half-story skylights where the second floor would be; the second-story skylights are recessed slightly inward within the building. The eastern facade forms the back of the building, facing the pool area. The eastern facade is subdivided into six bays.

Inside, the roofs of each locker room are supported by arched concrete buttresses that run between the rooms' northern and southern walls. The lowest 6 feet 5 inches (1.96 m) of each wall is tiled while the rest of the wall is plastered. The locker rooms each contain lockers on their northern and southern walls. Otherwise they are nearly identical except for differing placements of several window openings. During the fall through spring, these locker rooms are used as gymnasium facilities. To the east of the locker rooms are toilets and showers for each gender. These facilities were arranged so that both the men's and women's shower rooms contained an exit to the southern facade at the extreme eastern end of the building. The northern facade of the bathhouse's eastern end also contains entrances to a girls' bathroom, a mothers' room, and a director's office. The southern facade of that part of the building includes a boys' bathroom, adjacent to the entrance to the men's shower room.

==== Pool ====
The complex contains a rectangular main pool and formerly also consisted of smaller diving and wading pools. The main pool is to the south of the bathhouse and measures 330 by 125 feet (101 by 38 m), (Note: Dimensions of the main pool are alternatively given as 330 by 120 feet (101 by 37 m).) with a depth of 4 feet (1.2 m). To the south of the main pool was a semicircular diving pool, which since 2014 contains spray fountains. A ramp, underneath the overpass between the brick first-aid house and the Play Center's courthouse, provides entrance to the pool from Fulton Avenue to the west. Concrete bleachers are along the western border of the pool area, adjoining a retaining wall that separates the pool area from Fulton Avenue, and extend southward along the round edge of the diving pool area. The eastern side of the pool area contains twelve niches with benches, set into the retaining wall on that side. A single-story filter house sits to the east of the main pool area, south of the benches.

The former wading pool area, now part of Bathgate Playground, is north of the bathhouse. It is surrounded by a retaining wall. The pool area, once semicircular before being converted into a hexagonal shape in the 1980s, was filled in by 1996. The site contains playground equipment such as swings and benches.

== Notable events ==
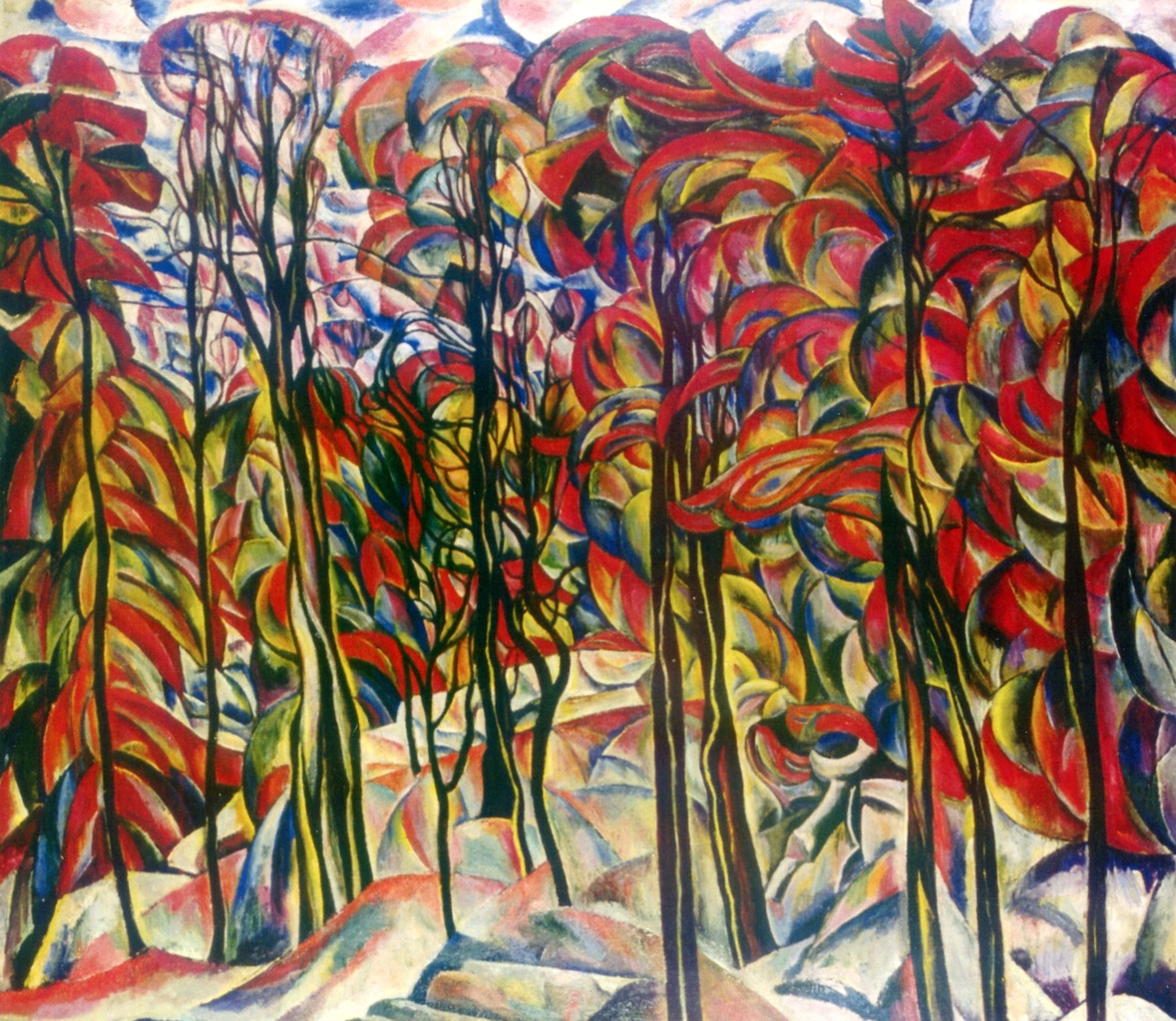
Abraham A. Manievich, Autumn, Crotona Park, Bronx (1922–1925)

From 1996 to 2012, the park hosted the EmblemHealth Bronx Open, an International Tennis Federation women's tennis tournament with a $100,000 purse which featured players in the top 100, who used the tournament as a "tune-up" for the US Open which begins the following week. The Bronx Open also hosted the United States Tennis Association's National Junior Doubles championship for boys and girls age 14–16, an event which continued after the demise of the ITF event. Proceeds from the tournament benefited New York Junior Tennis and Learning. The Bronx Open was revived in 2019 as a WTA International tournament, held at the park and hosted by New York Junior Tennis and Learning.

On May 23, 2024, Donald Trump held a rally in Crotona Park for his 2024 U.S. presidential campaign.

== In popular culture ==
Crotona Park is depicted in Abraham A. Manievich's "Autumn, Crotona Park, Bronx" (c. 1922–1925), owned by the National Art Museum of Ukraine, and was also referenced in Clifford Odets's play Waiting for Lefty (1935).

== See also ==
- Art Deco architecture of New York City
- List of New York City Designated Landmarks in the Bronx
- National Register of Historic Places listings in the Bronx
