= Moses J. Epstein =

American politician

Member of the New York State Assembly from the Bronx County, 3rd District district
- In office 1957–1960
- Preceded by: Morris Mohr
- Succeeded by: Jerome Schutzer

Personal details
- Born: 1911 New York City, U.S.
- Died: October 10, 1960 (aged 48–49) Franklin D. Roosevelt East River Drive, Manhattan, New York
- Cause of death: heart attack
- Party: Democratic
- Education: St. John's University School of Law
- Occupation: lawyer and politician

Moses J. Epstein (c. 1911 – October 10, 1960) was an American lawyer and politician from New York.

== Life ==
He was born about 1910 in New York City. He attended Public School No. 7, DeWitt Clinton High School, Long Island University and St. John's University School of Law. He was admitted to the bar in 1940.

Epstein was a Democratic member of the New York State Assembly (Bronx Co., 3rd D.) from 1957 until his death in 1960, sitting in the 171st and 172nd New York State Legislatures.

He died on October 10, 1960, while driving his car on the Franklin D. Roosevelt East River Drive, of a heart attack.

== Sources ==
New York State Assembly
Preceded by Morris Mohr	New York State Assembly; Bronx County, 3rd District; 1957–1960	Succeeded by Jerome Schutzer
