= Guy Velella =

American politician (1944–2011)

Guy J. Velella

Member of the New York State Senate from the 34th district
- In office April 22, 1986 – May 14, 2004
- Preceded by: John D. Calandra
- Succeeded by: Jeffrey D. Klein

Member of the New York State Assembly from the 80th district
- In office January 1, 1973 – December 31, 1982
- Preceded by: Ferdinand J. Mondello
- Succeeded by: G. Oliver Koppell

Personal details
- Born: September 25, 1944 East Harlem, New York, U.S.
- Died: January 27, 2011 (aged 66) The Bronx, New York, U.S.
- Party: Republican
- Education: St. John's University (BA); Suffolk University (JD)

Guy John Velella (September 25, 1944 – January 27, 2011) was an American Republican politician serving as a New York State Senator from the Bronx. He was a political leader, state assemblyman, and state senator for over 30 years,

Velella was indicted in 2002 on 25 counts of bribery and conspiracy for allegedly accepting at least $137,000 in exchange for steering public works contracts to the paying parties. He ultimately pleaded guilty in a plea bargain to one count of conspiracy in the fourth degree (Penal Law § 105.10), a class E felony, admitting that he helped clients obtain business from government agencies, and that the clients paid fees in excess of $10,000 to his father's law firm, in exchange for a year in jail. As part of the plea agreement reached with the Manhattan District Attorney, Velella resigned his seat in the State Senate and his position as Chairman of the Bronx County Republican Party. He was also disbarred. He served a total of six months (in two separate stints) of his sentence at Rikers Island.

== Biography ==
Velella was born on September 25, 1944, in Manhattan, New York and resided in East Harlem, then a heavily Italian-American enclave. Velella's father Vincent J. Velella was a politically-connected lawyer, known for his association with local politico Rep. Vito Marcantonio and Five Families mobsters Tommy Lucchese and Anthony Salerno.

The Velella family moved to the Bronx in the late 1950s. In 1967, Velella graduated from St. John's University, Jamaica, New York. He then earned a Juris Doctor degree from the Suffolk School of Law (today the Suffolk University Law School) in Boston, Massachusetts, and joined his father's law practice.

In 1972, aged 28, Velella, a Republican, ran for the New York State Assembly in the East Bronx. The incumbent Democrat withdrew from the race unexpectedly, and Velella won the race. He served in the Assembly from 1973 to 1982, sitting in the 180th, 181st, 182nd, 183rd and 184th New York State Legislatures. After redistricting, Velella found himself running in a new Democratic district in 1982, which then covered Throggs Neck and Parkchester. In a bitter campaign, he ran against popular Assemblyman and head of the Parkchester Tenants Association, John C. Dearie. After losing his seat, Velella became paid staff of the State Assembly GOP.

Velella returned to elected office on April 22, 1986, when he was elected to the New York State Senate, to fill the vacancy caused by the death of John D. Calandra. The three-way race was bitter and costly, as JoAnn Calandra, Calandra's widow, backed by the late senator's partisans, sought to retain family control of the seat. The Democratic candidate, Michael Durso, also generated interest.

In a battle that echoed those for the Republican nomination and the Senate seat itself, Velella also became chairman of the Bronx Republican Party. He was subsequently re-elected to the State Senate in November 1986 and in every subsequent election until November 2002, sitting in the 186th, 187th, 188th, 189th, 190th, 191st, 192nd, 193rd, 194th and 195th New York State Legislatures.

He resigned his seat on May 14, 2004, as part of a plea bargain reached on criminal charges that he took bribes to help businesses win lucrative state contracts. According to the text of the indictment, the bribes were in the form of payments to the Velellas' law firm for little or no work.

== Initial reputation ==
As a state senator, Velella brought millions of state dollars into his district, which funded local projects. Velella also worked for his constituents through his advocacy on their behalf with the federal, state, and city government. Velella's success in securing money for his district and record on constituent service made him popular among some in his district, including conservative Democrats (or "Reagan Democrats"), though on the other hand Norwood News ran an article entitled "Velella's Voting Record Is in Eye of Beholder".

== Influence ==
As one of the handful of Republican State Senators from New York City, Velella exercised considerable influence in the state legislature and in both Westchester County and New York City politics.

In 1989, Velella became chairman of the powerful Senate Insurance Committee. In this capacity, Velella secured passage of laws affecting the insurance industry in New York. Velella reached the height of his influence and power during the mid-1990s. He enjoyed access to important elected officials, many of them Republicans, such as U.S. Senator Alfonse D'Amato, Governor George Pataki, Attorney General Dennis Vacco, New York City Mayor Rudolph Giuliani, and NYS Senate Majority Leader Joseph Bruno.

Velella used his many contacts to secure patronage jobs for his supporters. Other key backers such as Bill Newmark, the chairman of the Bronx Conservative Party, joined his legislative payroll.

During Rudy Giuliani's first mayoral bid in 1989, Velella and D'Amato acted together to deny Giuliani the support he needed to beat David Dinkins, the eventual Democratic nominee, even going so far as to engineer a completely spurious candidacy on the part of cosmetics heir Ronald Lauder to challenge Giuliani in the Republican primary. Victor B. Tosi, Velella's executive assistant and a long-time Bronx Republican activist, served as Lauder's campaign manager. Lauder lost the primary, but the nearly $13 million he spent on negative campaign commercials damaged Giuliani's candidacy.

In the general election, Velella endorsed Giuliani, who went on to lose narrowly to Dinkins. Later, when D'Amato and the Governor-Elect Pataki decided to foment a coup against then-Majority Leader Ralph Marino, who had clashed repeatedly with Pataki during the latter's brief tenure in the New York State Senate, Velella acted as Pataki's and D'Amato's agent, drafting Senate Members for a Thanksgiving coup in 1994 against Long Island's Marino and in favor of upstate Rensselaer County's Joe Bruno. This occurred even though Velella had been, upon the retirement of former Majority Leader Warren M. Anderson, one of a small circle who had helped to engineer Marino's ascension to the Leader's post and was one of Marino's most visible and rewarded allies during the ensuing years. While serving in the state legislature, Velella also maintained a thriving law practice, which benefited from his Senate role as Insurance Chairman. Industry giants gave hundreds of thousands of dollars in legal work to his small private law firm, in a nondescript office next to a nail salon, one block from his district office.

He was a partner, with his father, in Velella, Velella, Basso, and Calandra, a law firm in the Morris Park section of the Bronx. After his conviction, Velella surrendered his law license. In 2004, the law firm changed its name to Velella, Basso, and Cirrincione and then, after the retirement of Vincent Velella, to Basso and Cirrincione. The law firm is now known as Velella & Basso.

== Controversies and scandals ==
In 1987, Velella admitted that he had fathered a child out of wedlock with an Albany woman with whom he had had a longtime affair. The year before, Velella's supporters distributed campaign literature that championed him as an advocate of family values and criticized liberal Democrats for undermining sexual morality. Velella later said he had made financial arrangements with the child's mother to support his newborn daughter, Alexandra Velella.

In 1993, Velella was accused of fixing local school board elections. No criminal charges were filed.

== City-wide races ==
In 1981, then-Assemblyman Velella ran for New York City Council President against the incumbent Democrat Carol Bellamy and lost. In 1985, Velella ran for New York City Comptroller against the three-time Democratic incumbent, Harrison J. Goldin, but lost again, by a wide margin.

== As Bronx Republican Chairman ==
In 1986, Velella became the chairman of the Bronx Republican Party. He resigned that position in 2004. Critics charged that Velella did nothing to build the local GOP and maintained a "non-aggression pact" with the Bronx County Democratic organization.

Although he maintained a cordial and mutually-beneficial relationship with the Bronx Democratic political machine, Velella did work hard to get Republicans elected to prominent offices. In 1992, Velella campaigned for Senator D'Amato, who was facing a tough re-election fight against Democratic challenger, New York Attorney General Robert Abrams. D'Amato was narrowly re-elected. Velella and Giuliani put aside their previous animosity, and the Bronx Republican leader enthusiastically campaigned for him in 1993. On Election Day, Velella oversaw a "ballot security program," which sought to deter voter fraud at the polls. In 1994, Velella devoted his resources to the Pataki and Vacco campaigns, which were both successful.

In 2001, Velella endorsed former Bronx Borough President and Congressman Herman Badillo, who became a Republican in the 1990s, in the race to succeed the term-limited Mayor Giuliani. In the Republican primary, Badillo faced billionaire Michael Bloomberg, who won the endorsement of the city's four other Republican county chairmen in Manhattan, Queens, Brooklyn, and Staten Island. When Velella realized he was the only Republican county chairman in the city supporting Badillo, Velella stopped actively campaigning for Badillo and publicly called on him to withdraw from the race. Velella explained to the New York Post that he didn't like primaries although he enthusiastically backed Lauder in 1989 against Giuliani. Bloomberg won the primary handily. Velella then campaigned for Bloomberg, who went on to narrowly defeat Mark Green in the general election.

== StopGuy.com ==
In late 2002, a number of Morris Park residents expressed their concerns over a (now-defunct) web site with the domain www.morrispark.com. The site reportedly contained pornographic images, racial and ethnic jokes and insults, and criticism of local businesses, community leaders and politicians, including Velella. The site's domain was registered under what was believed to be a false name, and its owner has never been identified. Velella announced that he would draft legislation that would require web site operators to register with the New York State Attorney General. Velella's action sparked the creation of a now-defunct "Stop Guy" Web site.

== Early release controversy ==
On June 21, 2004, Velella was sentenced to one year in jail for bribery under a plea deal, but was released from Rikers Island on September 28, 2004, after less than 12 weeks by the Local Conditional Release Commission, an obscure New York City agency. (Ironically, in the State Senate, Velella had voted to abolish the LCRC.) His early release sparked outrage, especially in the media. Both the New York Post and New York Daily News, which had both endorsed Velella in past campaigns, published editorials demanding his return to jail. The New York Post pasted Velella's face on a Monopoly "Get Out of Jail Free" card and published it daily in its opinion section.

Mayor Michael Bloomberg called for an investigation into the circumstances of Velella's early release. The New York City Department of Investigation, which looked into the matter, found that the Local Conditional Release Commission had violated established procedures when it granted Velella's request. Mayor Bloomberg then forced the resignation of all four commission members in October and reconstituted the panel by appointing five new members, who on November 19, 2004, ordered Velella back to prison. Although Velella appealed the decision, the New York State Appeals Court refused to give him another reprieve. He returned to Rikers Island in late December to resume his sentence, and was released on March 18, 2005, after serving only 182 days of his original one-year sentence.

== Additional notoriety ==
Velella received slot #94 in reporter and conservative commentator Bernard Goldberg's book, 100 People Who Are Screwing Up America, citing his change in stance of crime and justice issues before and after his incarceration

== Post-political activities ==
Velella continued to receive an annual state pension of $75,012. In 2005, he told the New York Daily News that he did some political and business consulting. In 2007, he purchased a new home in Eastchester, a town in Westchester County, New York, but remained a resident of Morris Park.

== Death ==
On January 21, 2011, the New York Daily News disclosed that Velella was suffering from "inoperable lung cancer" and had moved to Calvary Hospital for the terminally ill in the Bronx, where he died on January 27, 2011, aged 66.

New York State Assembly
Preceded by Ferdinand J. Mondello	Member of the New York State Assembly from the 80th district 1973–1982	Succeeded by G. Oliver Koppell
New York State Senate
Preceded by John D. Calandra	Member of the New York State Senate from the 34th district 1986–2004	Succeeded by Jeffrey Klein
Party political offices
Preceded by John A. Esposito	Republican nominee for President of the New York City Council; 1981	Succeeded by Eva Guardarramas
Preceded by Richard A. Bernstein	Republican nominee for New York City Comptroller; 1985	Succeeded by Albert Lemishow
