= Abraham Bernstein (politician) =

American lawyer and politician

Abraham Bernstein (May 1, 1918 – March 4, 1990) was an American lawyer and politician from New York.

== Life and career ==
He was born on May 1, 1918, in the Bronx, New York City. He attended DeWitt Clinton High School. He graduated from City College of New York and Brooklyn Law School. He was admitted to the bar in 1941, and practiced law in New York City. During World War II he served in the U.S. Army, and was awarded the Army Commendation Ribbon.

He was a member of the New York State Senate from 1961 until his death in 1990, sitting in the 173rd, 174th, 175th, 176th, 177th, 178th, 179th, 180th, 181st, 182nd, 183rd, 184th, 185th, 186th, 187th, 188th New York State Legislatures. In 1977, he had a leg amputated. From 1980 to 1982, he was president of the National Association of Jewish Legislators.

Bernstein introduced a bill to ban professional wrestling in February 1985, which was never voted out of committee. Later that year, New York Senate Democrats formed a task force to investigate professional wrestling with Bernstein as the chair. The task force held their hearings on the 44^{th} floor of the World Trade Center in New York City. Over 200 people were asked to testify, but only a handful agreed. Captain Lou Albano told The New York Times that he did not agree to testify because, "some of these politicians have brains the size of dehydrated peas." Morgus the Maniac (incorrectly identified as Manfred the Maniac) also told The New York Times he turned the invitation down and added that if he had testified he may have felt compelled to body slam members of the task force. Sheik Ali was one of the few wrestlers who testified and he denied that wrestling had predetermined outcomes. Former wrestler Eddy Mansfield told the task force that wrestling was fixed.

He died on March 4, 1990, in a hospital in the Bronx, of a heart attack; and was buried at the New Mount Lebanon Cemetery in Iselin, New Jersey.

New York State Senate
Preceded by Nathaniel T. Helman	New York State Senate; 28th District; 1961–1965	Succeeded by Whitney North Seymour, Jr.
Preceded by Julian B. Erway	New York State Senate; 36th district 1966	Succeeded by Bernard G. Gordon
Preceded by Joseph Zaretzki	New York State Senate; 32nd district 1967–1972	Succeeded by Joseph L. Galiber
Preceded by John D. Calandra	New York State Senate; 33rd district 1973–1990	Succeeded by Jeffrey R. Korman
