= Israel Ruiz Jr. =

American politician (born 1943)

Member of the New York City Council from the 14th district
- In office 1992–1997
- Succeeded by: Adolfo Carrión Jr.

Member of the New York State Senate
- In office January 1, 1975 – May 26, 1989
- Preceded by: Harrison J. Goldin
- Succeeded by: Efrain Gonzalez Jr.

Personal details
- Born: July 10, 1943 (age 83) Cabo Rojo, Puerto Rico
- Party: Democratic
- Education: Queens College (BA); Columbia Law School (JD)

Israel Ruiz Jr. (born July 10, 1943) is an American attorney and politician from New York who served as a member of the New York State Senate and New York City Council.

== Early life and education ==
He was born on July 10, 1943, in Cabo Rojo, Puerto Rico. He earned a Bachelor of Arts degree from Queens College in 1968, and a Juris Doctor from Columbia Law School in 1972.

== Career ==
He was a member of the New York State Senate from 1975 to 1989, sitting in the 181st, 182nd, 183rd, 184th, 185th, 186th, 187th and 188th New York State Legislatures. In 1985, he ran in the Democratic primary for President of the New York City Council, but was defeated by Andrew Stein, coming in third among six candidates.

On August 23, 1988, Ruiz was indicted for fraud and perjury. He was accused of funneling part of the money received from the State by a non-profit organization into his own pockets, and of lying to a bank while asking for a personal loan. On November 8, he was re-elected to the State Senate. His trial began on January 19, 1989, in the United States District Court for the Southern District of New York. On February 3, 1989, he was convicted of filing a false loan application statement, but was acquitted of the perjury charges.

Controversy arose again whether the conviction would vacate the State Senate seat automatically, or whether the seat would be vacated only after sentencing, or not at all. State law expressly states that the seat is vacated upon conviction for a felony. Previously it was assumed that the seat would be vacated automatically only in case of conviction in a State court, but would be vacated in case of conviction in a federal court only at sentencing. Also, the crime of which Ruiz was convicted is classified under federal law as a felony, but under State law only as a misdemeanor. On February 10, Attorney General Robert Abrams ruled that Ruiz's seat was vacant and ordered to withhold the payment of Ruiz's State Senate salary. Abrams cited a decision of October 1988 by the New York Court of Appeals which ruled that any federal felony conviction also automatically vacates a seat in the State Legislature. Nevertheless, Ruiz hung on to his seat, but refrained from voting in the Senate. On May 10, Ruiz was sentenced by Judge Peter K. Leisure to six months in jail.

On May 26, Temporary President of the State Senate Ralph J. Marino announced that he would file a statement with Governor Mario Cuomo that the seat formerly occupied by Ruiz was now vacant. On June 9, Governor Cuomo called a special election to fill the vacancy. Ruiz tried to run in the Democratic primary for his former seat, but was barred by the New York Supreme Court, Appellate Division, ruling that an expelled member may not run for the same term in office again. On August 31, the Appellate Division's decision was upheld by the Court of Appeals.

In 1991, Ruiz entered the Democratic primary for the 14th district of the New York City Council. Soon after the election, Ruiz was believed to have narrowly defeated Sandra Ramos-Alamo, but two weeks later, on September 25, the official result was announced: Ruiz was defeated with a margin of 23 votes by Ramos-Alamo On October 8, the primary election was voided, and a new election was ordered. On October 22, Ruiz defeated Ramos-Alamo, and in November was elected to the City Council. He remained in the City Council until 1997. In September 1997, Ruiz challenged the incumbent Borough President of the Bronx Fernando Ferrer in the Democratic primary, but was defeated.

New York State Senate
Preceded by Harrison J. Goldin	New York State Senate; 31st district 1975–1982	Succeeded by Joseph L. Galiber
Preceded by Joseph L. Galiber	New York State Senate; 32nd district 1983–1989	Succeeded by Efrain Gonzalez Jr.
New York City Council
Preceded by Jerry Crispino	New York City Council; 14th district 1992–1997	Succeeded by Adolfo Carrión Jr.
