= Ivan Warner =

American politician (1919–1994)

Member of the New York State Senate from the 31st district
- In office January 1, 1967 – December 31, 1968
- Preceded by: Basil A. Paterson
- Succeeded by: Joseph Galiber

Member of the New York State Senate from the 27th district
- In office January 1, 1961 – December 31, 1965
- Preceded by: Jacob H. Gilbert
- Succeeded by: Paul P. E. Bookson

Member of the New York State Assembly from Bronx County's 6th district
- In office January 14, 1958 – December 31, 1960
- Preceded by: Walter H. Gladwin
- Succeeded by: Murray Lewinter

Personal details
- Born: February 18, 1919 New York City, New York
- Died: January 26, 1994 (aged 74) New York City, New York
- Occupation: Lawyer and politician

Ivan Warner (February 18, 1919 – January 26, 1994) was an American lawyer and politician in New York.

== Life ==
He was born on February 18, 1919, in Manhattan, New York City, the son of immigrants from Saint Kitts. He dropped out of Morris Evening High School, and worked as a clerk for the New York City Rent Commission. In 1949, he was hired by Congressman Isidore Dollinger as an aide, and went to Washington, D.C. While working for Dollinger, he completed his education in the evenings at the American University. Then he studied law at Brooklyn Law School, was admitted to the bar in 1955, and practiced law in New York City.

Warner was elected on January 14, 1958, to the New York State Assembly (Bronx Co., 6th D.), to fill the vacancy caused by the appointment of Walter H. Gladwin as a City Magistrate. He was re-elected in November 1958, and remained in the Assembly until 1960, sitting in the 171st and 172nd New York State Legislatures.

He was a member of the New York State Senate (27th D.) from 1961 to 1965, sitting in the 173rd, 174th and 175th New York State Legislatures. He was a delegate to the 1964 Democratic National Convention. In September 1965, he ran in the Democratic primary for Borough President of the Bronx, but was defeated by Herman Badillo.

Warner was again a member of the State Senate (31st D.) in 1967 and 1968. In November 1968, he was elected to the New York Supreme Court, and remained on the bench until his death in 1994. During his tenure, he went to live in New Rochelle.

He died on January 26, 1994, in Memorial Sloan Kettering Cancer Center in Manhattan, of cancer.

== Sources ==
New York State Assembly
Preceded by Walter H. Gladwin	New York State Assembly; Bronx County, 6th District; 1958–1960	Succeeded by Murray Lewinter
New York State Senate
Preceded by Jacob H. Gilbert	New York State Senate; 27th District; 1961–1965	Succeeded by Paul P. E. Bookson
Preceded by Basil A. Paterson	New York State Senate; 31st District; 1967–1968	Succeeded by Joseph L. Galiber
