= Efrain Gonzalez Jr. =

American politician (born 1948)

Member of the New York State Senate
- In office 1990 – December 31, 2008
- Preceded by: Israel Ruiz Jr.
- Succeeded by: Pedro Espada Jr.
- Constituency: 32nd district (1989-1992); 31st district (1993-2002); 33rd district (2003-2008)

Personal details
- Born: 1948 (age 77–78) Coamo, Puerto Rico
- Party: Democratic
- Children: 4

Efrain Gonzalez Jr. (born 1948) is an American politician who served as a member of the New York State Senate from 1990 to 2008.

== Early life ==
Gonzalez was born in Coamo, Puerto Rico, and his family moved to mainland United States shortly thereafter. Gonzalez was raised in The Bronx.

== Career ==
Prior to his election to the State Senate, Gonzalez worked as the union representative for the Transport Workers Union, and subsequently, the union representative for Local 820 of the International Brotherhood of Teamsters from 1969 until 1979, which was during his employment at Brinks Armored Car Service.

Gonzalez was elected to the New York State Senate in 1989, in a special election to replace Israel Ruiz Jr., who had been expelled upon conviction of fraud charges. He was the Chairman of the Minority Conference in the Senate, as well as Chairman Emeritus of the National Hispanic Caucus of State Legislators, and Chairman of the New York State Puerto Rican/Hispanic Task Force. He also was President of the National Hispanic Policy Institute and on the Executive Committee of the Parliamentary Confederation of the Americas.

=== Arrest and conviction ===
On August 25, 2006, Gonzalez was indicted on federal mail fraud charges. He was accused of taking $37,412 from November 2000 to May 2006 from the West Bronx Neighborhood Association, a nonprofit organization he founded, and using it for personal expenses, including New York Yankees tickets and membership fees at a vacation club in the Dominican Republic. He surrendered to federal authorities when his indictment was unsealed, and released on $25,000 bail following his arraignment the same day.

Despite the indictment, González had no primary challenger in the 2006 New York State Senate election, and he easily won against a token Republican opposition in the general election that year.

A superseding indictment followed on December 12, 2006, accusing Gonzalez and others of mail fraud and theft of federal funds in a conspiracy to steal $423,000 through a complicated scheme that involved funneling the money through the West Bronx Neighborhood Association and the United Latin American Foundation, another not-for-profit group. As in the first set of charges, he was also accused of using state money and about $40,000 in federal grants for membership fees in a vacation club, rent and renovations for homes used by his wife and mother-in-law, and items like Yankees tickets, jewelry and college tuition for his daughter, and designing and printing labels for cigars produced by a company he owned.

The case against Gonzalez was delayed because of concurrent investigations of other New York State lawmakers, and he was challenged in the 2008 Democratic primary by Pedro Espada Jr., who had previously been a New York State Senator in an adjoining district. Despite backing from the New York State Democratic party, Gonzalez lost the primary election.

On May 7, 2009, Gonzalez pleaded guilty to two counts of mail fraud and two counts of conspiracy. The five other charges against him in the indictment, including money laundering, fraud, and the abuse of his office, were dropped. Neil Berger and Miguel Castanos, co-defendants who were involved in the scheme with the non-profit organizations and indicted with Gonzalez, also pleaded guilty, and Lucia Sanchez, a fourth defendant, went to trial.

Early in 2010, Gonzalez tried to withdraw his guilty plea, claiming that his first lawyer, Murray Richman, a friend who had represented him without charge, "seemed wholly uninterested in trial preparation, wanted me to plead guilty and was pressuring me to produce this outcome," that beyond interviewing a few minor witnesses, he did not pursue other key witnesses, and that he did not thoroughly review discovery materials that the government made available to the defense. However, U.S. District Court Judge William H. Pauley III, the trial judge, refused to allow Gonzalez to withdraw his plea, stating that the request "presents the paradigm of the defendant who attempts to undermine the integrity of the judicial process" and "the notion that the free will of a longtime New York state senator was overridden by the imminence of trial, coercion by his attorney, or pressure from this court is preposterous."

The following month, Gonzalez was sentenced to seven years in federal prison and ordered to forfeit $737,775. The prison sentence was subsequently upheld on appeal, although a portion of the financial restitution was set aside.

Gonzalez completed his sentence on August 3, 2016. Espada, his replacement in the State Senate, was also convicted of federal crimes and served a five-year prison term that ended in 2017.

== Personal life ==
Gonzalez was married on July 20, 1969, and has four children with his wife. He and his first wife divorced in March 1987.

New York State Senate
Preceded by Israel Ruiz, Jr.	New York State Senate; 32nd District; 1989–1992	Succeeded by Pedro Espada Jr.
Preceded by Joseph L. Galiber	New York State Senate; 31st District; 1993–2002	Succeeded by Eric Schneiderman
Preceded by Ruth Hassell-Thompson	New York State Senate; 33rd District; 2003–2008	Succeeded by Pedro Espada Jr.
