= Anthony J. Mercorella =

American politician (1927–2022)

Member of the New York City Council from the 14th district
- In office January 1, 1974 – September 19, 1975
- Preceded by: Edward L. Sadowsky
- Succeeded by: Jerry L. Crispino

Member of the New York City Council from the 7th district
- In office January 3, 1973 – December 31, 1973
- Preceded by: Mario Merola
- Succeeded by: Carter Burden

Member of the New York State Assembly from the 85th district
- In office January 1, 1967 – December 31, 1972
- Preceded by: Seymour Posner
- Succeeded by: John C. Dearie

Member of the New York State Assembly from the 93rd district
- In office January 1, 1966 – December 31, 1966
- Preceded by: District created
- Succeeded by: Peter R. Biondo

Personal details
- Born: March 6, 1927 New York City, New York, U.S.
- Died: February 3, 2022 (aged 94) Naples, Florida, U.S.
- Party: Democratic

Anthony Joseph Mercorella (March 6, 1927 – February 3, 2022) was an American politician who served in the New York State Assembly from 1966 to 1972 and in the New York City Council from 1973 to 1975. Mercorella was born in New York City, New York in The Bronx. He graduated from Long Island University and Fordham University School of Law. He practiced law in New York City. Mercorella served as a civil court judge and then served on the New York Supreme Court. Mercorella died on February 3, 2022, in Naples, Florida, at the age of 94.
