= Jerry L. Crispino =

American politician (1930–2009)

Member of the New York City Council from the 14th district
- In office October 9, 1975 – December 31, 1991
- Preceded by: Anthony J. Mercorella
- Succeeded by: Israel Ruiz Jr.

Personal details
- Born: April 17, 1930 Manhattan, New York City, New York
- Died: March 20, 2009 (aged 78) Pelham Manor, New York
- Party: Democratic

Jerry L. Crispino (April 17, 1930 – March 20, 2009) was an American politician who served in the New York City Council from the 14th district from 1975 to 1991.

He died on March 20, 2009, in Pelham Manor, New York at age 78.
