= John D. Calandra =

American politician (1928–1986)

John D. Calandra (August 8, 1928 – January 20, 1986) was an American lawyer and politician from New York.

== Life ==
He was born on August 8, 1928. He attended St. Philip Neri Grammar School, Immaculate High School, and St. Bonaventure University. He graduated from St. John's Law School. He was an Assistant United States Attorney. He was Chairman of the Republican Party in the Bronx. He married Jo Ann Trentacosta, and they had two children.

He ran for the New York State Senate in 1962 and 1964, but was defeated both times by Democrat Joseph E. Marine. In November 1965, after re-apportionment, he was elected, and then re-elected several times. He was a member of the State Senate from 1966 until his death in 1986, sitting in the 176th, 177th, 178th, 179th, 180th, 181st, 182nd, 183rd, 184th, 185th and 186th New York State Legislatures. In 1967, he ran for District Attorney of Bronx County, but was defeated by the incumbent Democrat Isidore Dollinger. In the New York State Senate, Calandra rose to the position of Majority Whip.

Calandra lived in an area of the Bronx between Pelham and Pelham Bay Park. His son, John J. Calandra, stated that John D. Calandra faced criticism from political opponents due to his living in the area.

He died on January 20, 1986, in Mount Sinai Hospital in Manhattan, after suffering a series of heart attacks. His widow Jo Ann Calandra ran as an Independent in the special election for her husband's Senate seat in April 1986, but was defeated by Republican Guy Velella.

== Legacy ==
The John D. Calandra Italian American Institute, which is located in Manhattan but under the aegis of Queens College, New York City, is named in his honor. The John D. Calandra Lodge #2600 of the Order of Sons of Italy in America (OSIA) is named after him, and was founded in 1986, based in Yonkers. Public School 14, "The Senator John D. Calandra School," is located at 3041 Bruckner Boulevard, Bronx, NY 10461, in the neighborhood of Pelham Bay. Bronx Terrace, which is off Yonkers Avenue in Yonkers, NY, was renamed Senator John D. Calandra Drive in 1986, in his honor.

New York State Senate
Preceded by Owen M. Begley	Member of the New York State Senate from the 38th district 1966	Succeeded by Jay P. Rolison, Jr.
Preceded by Jerome Schutzer	Member of the New York State Senate from the 33rd district 1967–1972	Succeeded by Abraham Bernstein
Preceded by John E. Flynn	Member of the New York State Senate from the 34th district 1973–1986	Succeeded by Guy Velella
