= Harrison J. Goldin =

American politician (1936–2024)

39th New York City Comptroller
- In office January 1, 1974 – December 31, 1989
- Preceded by: Abraham Beame
- Succeeded by: Elizabeth Holtzman

Member of the New York State Senate
- In office 1966–1973

Personal details
- Born: Harrison Jacob Goldin; February 23, 1936 New York City, U.S.
- Died: September 16, 2024 (aged 88) New York City, U.S.
- Party: Democratic
- Spouse: Diana Stern (m. 1966)
- Children: 3
- Education: Princeton University (AB); Yale University (LLB)
- Occupation: Lawyer

Harrison Jacob Goldin (February 23, 1936 – September 16, 2024), often known as Jay Goldin, was an American lawyer and politician. He served as a member of the New York State Senate from 1966 to 1973 but was better known for his almost-sixteen year tenure as New York City Comptroller from January 1974 to December 1989.

== Early life ==
Harrison Jacob Goldin was born on February 23, 1936, into a Jewish family in the Bronx, New York City to Harry and Anna Goldin (née Eskolsky), the son of a doctor and grandson of a rabbi. He graduated as Science Valedictorian from the Bronx High School of Science in 1953, and received an A.B. summa cum laude from Princeton University in 1957, and an LL.B. from Yale Law School, where he was articles editor of the Yale Law Journal and was elected to the Order of the Coif. Goldin was a Woodrow Wilson Fellow at the Harvard Graduate School. Just prior to his graduation, Goldin turned down several top Wall Street jobs, and instead chose to work during the Kennedy Administration as an attorney in the U.S. Department of Justice's Office of Civil Rights.

== Career ==
After working two years with the Justice Department as a civil rights lawyer in the South, Goldin returned to New York and joined the prominent law firm Davis, Polk & Wardwell. He was a member of the New York State Senate from 1966 to 1973, sitting in the 176th, 177th, 178th, 179th, and 180th New York State Legislatures. After previously seeking the office in 1969, he was elected New York City Comptroller in 1973, and held the office for four terms. His first years as comptroller were consumed by a deep fiscal crisis, during which the city was nearly driven to bankruptcy. His tenure coincided with the mayoralties of Abraham Beame and Ed Koch. Though historian Kim Phillips-Fein has described conflict between city mayors and comptrollers as "more or less inevitable", Goldin was noted for his clashes with both, especially Koch, with an animosity that The New York Times said often ran "nasty and personal".

In 1981, Goldin's office was investigated after he solicited campaign contributions from a businessman who was seeking to build bus shelters in the city; the investigation closed without charges against him. He was then investigated later in the decade over his ties with trader Ivan Boesky, who had pled guilty to insider trading, but no charges were filed against Goldin.

Goldin twice sought higher office. In 1978, he ran for New York State Comptroller, but lost to Republican Edward Regan, who had been endorsed by retiring Democratic incumbent Arthur Levitt Sr. In 1989, he ran in the Democratic primary for Mayor of New York City, challenging Koch, but was defeated by David Dinkins, coming in last place with only 2.7% of the vote.

After leaving public office in 1989, he opened Goldin Associates, a financial advisory and turnaround consulting firm. The firm's notable cases included Drexel Burnham Lambert, Rockefeller Center, Enron and Refco. Goldin Associates was acquired by Teneo in 2020.

He was a founding Chair (then Chair Emeritus) of the Council of Institutional Investors and a Fellow of the American College of Bankruptcy. Goldin was an adjunct professor of Accounting at the Stern School of Business at New York University and an adjunct professor of law at Cardozo and New York Law Schools. He was also a lecturer in law at Columbia Law School.

== Personal life and death ==
In 1966, Goldin married Diana Stern, and they had three children. He was the nephew of the Talmudic scholar Judah Goldin.

Goldin died at a hospital in Manhattan on September 16, 2024, at the age of 88.

New York State Senate
Preceded by E. Ogden Bush	New York State Senate; 34th district 1966	Succeeded by John E. Flynn
Preceded by Jerome L. Wilson	New York State Senate; 30th district 1967–1972	Succeeded by Robert García
Preceded by Joseph L. Galiber	New York State Senate; 31st district 1973	Succeeded by Israel Ruiz, Jr.
Political offices
Preceded by Abraham Beame	New York City Comptroller; 1974–1989	Succeeded by Elizabeth Holtzman
Party political offices
Preceded by Arthur Levitt, Sr.	Democratic nominee for New York State Comptroller; 1978	Succeeded by Raymond F. Gallagher
