= Bogue =

Bogue may refer to:

== Places ==
- Borgue, Dumfries and Galloway, Scotland
- Boghé or Bogué, a town in Mauritania
- Bogue (strait), a strait in the Pearl River, China
- Bogue, a suburb of Montego Bay, Jamaica

=== United States ===
- Bogue, Kansas, a city
- Bogue, North Carolina, a town
- Bogue Banks, a barrier island off the mainland of North Carolina
- Bogue Sound, a geographic sound in the state of North Carolina
  - Marine Corps Auxiliary Landing Field Bogue or Bogue Field, a landing field located on Bogue Sound

== Military ==
- Bogue-class escort carrier, for service with the U.S. Navy and the Royal Navy
  - USS Bogue, an aircraft carrier of the US Navy
- Battle of the Bogue (1856)

== People with the surname ==
- Andrew Wendell Bogue (1919–2009), American judge
- David Bogue (1750–1825), British religious leader
- Donald Bogue (1918–2004), American sociologist and demographer
- Eric Bogue (born 1964), American politician in South Dakota
- George Bogue (1906–1972), American football player
- George Marquis Bogue (1842–1903), American politician in Illinois
- Glenn Bogue (born 1955), Canadian sprinter
- Henry B. Bogue (1892–1985), American football and basketball coach
- Lorna Bogue, Irish politician
- Richard Bogue (1782–1813), British Army officer
- Robert Bogue (born 1964), American actor
- Virgil Bogue (1846–1916), American civil engineer
- Zelma Bogue (1880–1975), American politician in California
- Ish Kabibble (1908–1994), American comedian, born Merwyn Bogue
- Laura Bogue Luffman (1846–1929), English-born Australian journalist

== Other uses ==
- Bogue, synonym for the Esimbi language, spoken in parts of Cameroon
- Bogue (fish), a genus
  - Boops boops or bogue, a species of the family Sparidae

== See also ==
- Bogues, a surname
