= Dean Schrempp =

American politician (1935–2026)

Member of the South Dakota House of Representatives from the 28A district
- In office January 2009 – February 21, 2026 Serving with Betty Olson (2009–December 2016)
- Preceded by: Tom Van Norman
- Succeeded by: Oren L. Lesmeister

Member of the South Dakota House of Representatives from the 28A district
- In office January 1997 – January 1999 Serving with Kenneth Wetz
- Preceded by: Eric Bogue
- Succeeded by: Ted Klaudt

Member of the South Dakota House of Representatives from the 28A district
- In office January 1993 – January 1995 Serving with Della Wishard
- Preceded by: District created
- Succeeded by: Eric Bogue

Personal details
- Born: July 4, 1935 Dupree, South Dakota, U.S.
- Died: February 21, 2026 (aged 90)
- Party: Democratic
- Spouse: Mavis Schrempp
- Children: 8

Dean D. Schrempp (July 4, 1935 – February 21, 2026) was an American politician who was a Democratic member of the South Dakota House of Representatives representing District 28A since January 2009. Schrempp was non-consecutively a member from January 1993 until January 1995 and from January 1997 until January 1999. Schrempp died on February 21, 2026, at the age of 90.

== Elections ==
- 2012 – Schrempp was unopposed for both the June 5, 2012, Democratic primary and the November 6, 2012, general election, winning with 2,657 votes.
- 1992 – Under a new district system, Schrempp won the District 28A June 2, 1992, Democratic primary with 542 votes (53.4%), and won the November 3, 1992, general election with 1,564 votes (55.34%) against Republican nominee Vince Dahlgren.
- 1994 – Schrempp was challenged in the June 7, 1994, Democratic primary and lost to Mark Van Norman; Van Norman lost the November 8, 1994, general election to Republican nominee Eric Bogue.
- 1996 – Schrempp and incumbent Republican representative Eric Bogue were unopposed for their primaries, Schrempp won the November 5, 1996, general election with by 76 votes with 1,762 votes (51.1%) against Representative Bogue.
- 1998 – When William Johnson left the South Dakota Senate District 28 seat open, Schrempp and former Republican representative Bogue were unopposed for their primaries; in the November 3, 1998, General election Schrempp lost to Representative Bogue.
- 2000 – Schrempp and incumbent Republican senator Bogue were unopposed for their 2000 primaries, setting up a rematch; in the November 7, 2000, General election Schrempp again lost to Senator Bogue.
- 2004 – To challenge incumbent Republican senator Bogue again, Schrempp won the June 1, 2004, Democratic primary by 90 votes with 1,075 votes (52.2%) but lost the November 2, 2004, general election to Senator Bogue
- 2008 – When District 28A incumbent Democratic representatives Tom Van Norman was term limited and left the seat open, Schrempp won the June 3, 2008, Democratic primary with 878 votes (66.1%), and won the four-way November 4, 2008, general election with 1,673 votes (49.1%) ahead of Republican nominee Everett Hunt and Independent candidates Ira Blue Coat and Manny Iron Hawk; Hunt had been the Republican nominee in 2004 and 2006.
- 2010 – Schrempp was challenged by former representative Tom Van Norman in the June 8, 2010, Democratic primary; Schrempp won with 462 votes (65%), and was unopposed for the November 2, 2010, general election, winning with 1,849 votes.
