= Political career of David Paterson =

Political career of 55th Governor of New York

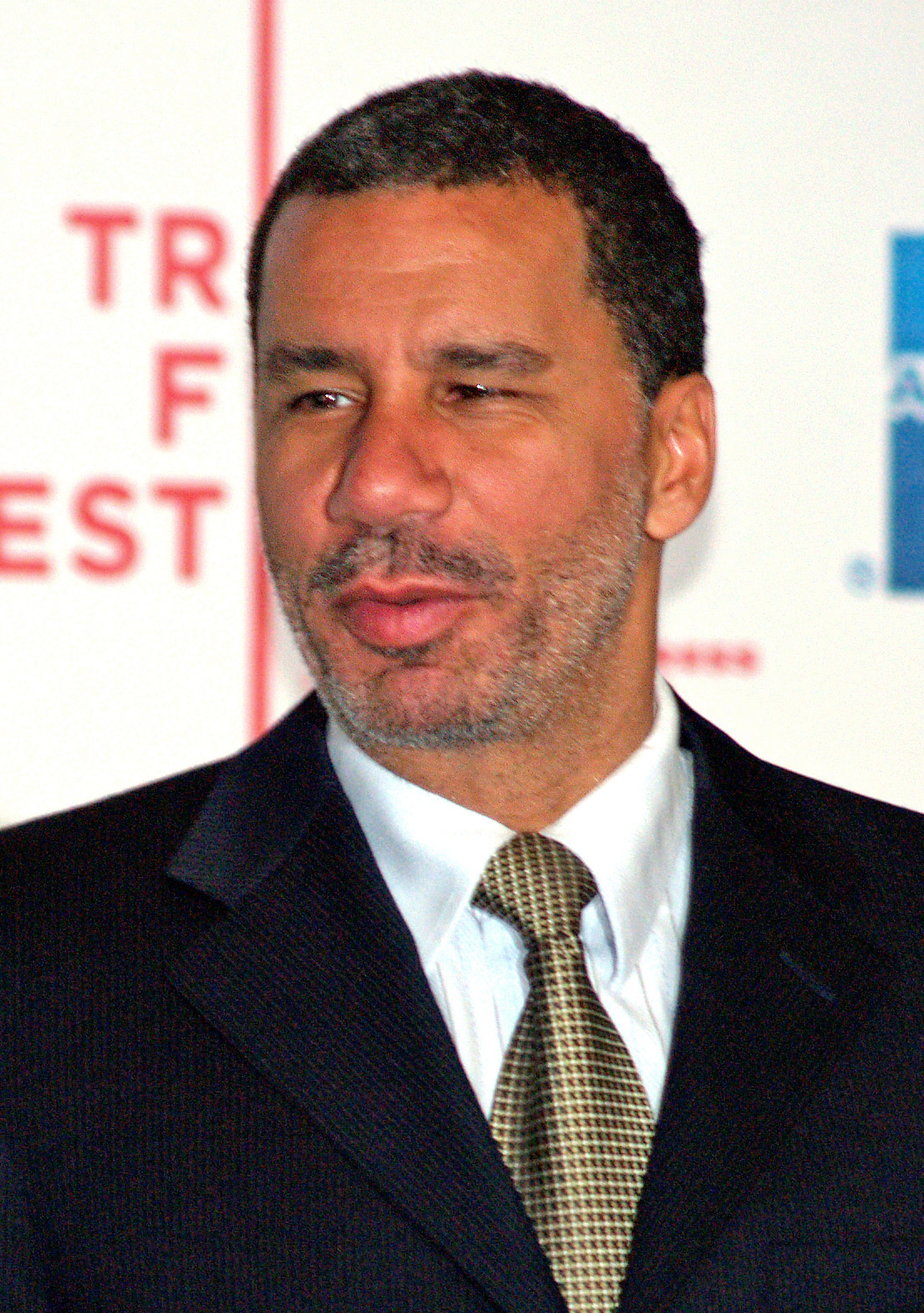
David Paterson at the 2008 Tribeca Film Festival

Prior to serving as governor of New York, David Paterson served in the New York State Senate, eventually becoming Senate minority leader.

== State senate ==
In 1985, Paterson resigned his position as assistant district attorney to join the then city clerk David Dinkins' successful campaign to win the Democratic nomination for Manhattan Borough President. That summer, on August 6, state senator Leon Bogues died, and Paterson sought and obtained the Democratic party nomination for the seat. In mid-September, a meeting of 648 Democratic committee members on the first ballot gave Paterson 58% of the vote. That October, Paterson won the hotly contested special State Senate election. At the time, the 29th Senate district covered the Manhattan neighborhoods of Harlem, Manhattan Valley and the Upper West Side, the same district that Paterson's father had represented. Upon his election, Paterson became the youngest State Senator in Albany. He won the seat again in 1986 for a full term representing the 29th District in the New York State Senate, and served as senator until assuming the office of Lieutenant Governor on January 1, 2007. (The districts changed for the 2002 election.)

In 1993 Paterson ran citywide in the Democratic primary for the office of New York City Public Advocate, the second highest elected office in the city. He lost to Mark Green, who received 45 percent of the primary vote; Paterson was second in the five-candidate race, with 19 percent of the vote. Paterson did not have the support in the 1993 effort from senior Harlem Democratic leaders, David Dinkins, Percy Sutton, Charles Rangel or his father, Basil Paterson. In 1997, Paterson also campaigned for Manhattan borough president; when he withdrew from the race, he worked for the election of C. Virginia Fields, who won the office.

On 9/11, Paterson was at his Harlem apartment when the Twin Towers were hit.

A member of the Democratic National Committee and a board member of the Democratic Legislative Campaign Committee, Paterson addressed the 2004 Democratic National Convention in Boston as well as the Democratic mayors at the U.S. Conference of Mayors.

== Senate minority leader ==
Paterson was elected by the Democratic caucus of the Senate as Minority Leader on November 20, 2002, becoming both the first non-white state legislative leader and the highest-ranking African American elected official in the history of New York State, unseating the incumbent Minority Leader, Martin Connor. Since the Great Depression, only one party caucus leader has been unseated in either legislature; Paterson succeeded without the help of a powerful patron, and owed no debts to other Democratic party leaders. Assembly Speaker Sheldon Silver sided with Connor, as did Brooklyn party leader Assemblyman Clarence Norman Jr. Paterson's ouster of Connor had been an alliance of Manhattan senators against the Brooklynite Connor's more suburban-friendly politics. His conciliatory withdrawal from the Manhattan borough president race, and his 2001 effort organizing Harlem elected officials to support the mayoral candidacy of Fernando Ferrer earned Paterson support in the Harlem and Manhattan Democratic leadership. "When I went to them and told them I was running for minority leader," Mr. Paterson said of his Harlem elders, "they were not only supportive, they were enthusiastic." David Dinkins telephoned wavering Democratic senators, lobbying them to support Paterson in the contest. Paterson indicated his long-term goals were to increase the number of Democratic Senators and, eventually, win a majority of the Senate.

Paterson became known for his consensus-building style coupled with sharp political skills. Charles J. O'Byrne, who was his chief of staff and worked for him during his time as Governor, joined his staff while working as Minority Leader. Paterson worked with then DEP Commissioner Christopher O. Ward to ensure that New York City's third water tunnel received state approval and funding. Paterson later appointed Ward to be executive director of the Port Authority of New York and New Jersey.

In 2006, Paterson sponsored a controversial bill to limit the use of deadly force by the police, but later changed that position. He also supported non-citizen voting in New York local elections. According to The New York Post, he "chalked up a heavily liberal record."

Describing Paterson's tenure in the senate, The New York Times cited his "wit, flurries of reform proposals and unusual bursts of candor." On March 12, 2008, Melissa Mansfield wrote in Newsday that "many good government groups expect that efforts to clean up Albany would continue" under his governorship, based on his reform record in the legislature, but a legislative opponent, Sen. Dean Skelos, asserted that Paterson "carries an urban agenda against fairness to the suburban communities."

Previously, Paterson had been mentioned as a possible successor to Senator Hillary Clinton should Clinton win the Democratic nomination and also the 2008 U.S. presidential election. Paterson was a 2008 Democratic party national convention superdelegate and endorsed Clinton.

== Arrest for civil disobedience ==
On March 18, 1999, Paterson, his father Basil, former Manhattan Borough President Percy Sutton, Kweisi Mfume, then-president of the National Association for the Advancement of Colored People, and 55 others were arrested by members of the New York Police Department for disorderly conduct. Paterson and the others were taking part in acts of civil disobedience to protest the shooting death of Amadou Diallo, an unarmed African immigrant who was shot by four white police officers. The demonstration was organized by Rev. Al Sharpton. The acts of civil disobedience at Police Plaza were directed at then New York City Mayor Rudy Giuliani, who ridiculed the protesters.

== Works ==
- Paterson, David Black, Blind, & In Charge: A Story of Visionary Leadership and Overcoming Adversity. New York, New York, 2020
