= Bogues =

Bogues is a surname. Notable people with the surname include:

- B. Anthony Bogues, Caribbean political theorist, historian, writer, and curator
- Leon Bogues (1927–1985), American politician
- Muggsy Bogues (born 1965), American basketball player
- Shannon Bogues (born 1997), American basketball player
- Sydney Uriah Bogues (1883–1954), Jamaican pharmacist
