= Betty Olson =

American politician

Member of the South Dakota Senate from the 28th district
- In office January 15, 2015 – January 10, 2017
- Preceded by: Ryan Maher
- Succeeded by: Ryan Maher

Member of the South Dakota House of Representatives from the 28B district
- In office January 9, 2007 – January 15, 2015 Serving with Tom Van Norman (2007–2009); Dean Schrempp (2009–2015)
- Preceded by: Ted Klaudt
- Succeeded by: J. Sam Marty

Personal details
- Born: April 19, 1946 (age 80)
- Party: Republican
- Profession: rancher, EMT, substitute schoolteacher

Betty Olson (born April 19, 1946) is a rancher, EMT, and substitute schoolteacher. She is an American politician who served as a Republican member of the South Dakota Senate in District 28 from 2015 to 2017. Before that, she was a member of the South Dakota House of Representatives in District 28B from 2007 to 2015.

== Early life and career ==
Betty Olson attended local schools and went to university. She became a rancher and also worked as an EMT. She worked some periods as a substitute teacher in the public schools. She lives in Prairie City, South Dakota.

== Elections ==
- 2012 Olson was unopposed for both the June 5, 2012 Republican Primary and the November 6, 2012 General election, winning with 4,028 votes.
- 2006 When incumbent Republican Representative Ted Klaudt ran for South Dakota Senate and left the District 28B seat open, Olson won the June 6, 2006 Republican Primary with 890 votes (53.8%), and was unopposed for the November 7, 2006 General election, winning with 2,808 votes.
- 2008 Olson was unopposed for both the June 3, 2008 Republican Primary and the November 4, 2008 General election, winning with 3,265 votes.
- 2010 Olson was unopposed for the June 8, 2010 Republican Primary and won the November 2, 2010 General election with 2,826 votes (72.5%) against Independent candidate Teresa Schanzenbach.

== Controversy ==
In 2014, Olson wrote a column for the Butte County Post (a South Dakota local weekly newspaper) that contained a joke widely criticized as a bigoted slur. The "joke" alleged that President Barack Obama was a Muslim terrorist, and cast 7-Eleven managers, Motel 6 managers, cab drivers, and customer service representatives as Muslim terrorists. As the controversy stirred and outrage grew, Olson refused to express regret for her words, saying the problem was that "people don't have a sense of humor." She later denied being a racist, noting that "the guy who sent it to me is married to a black lady...."
