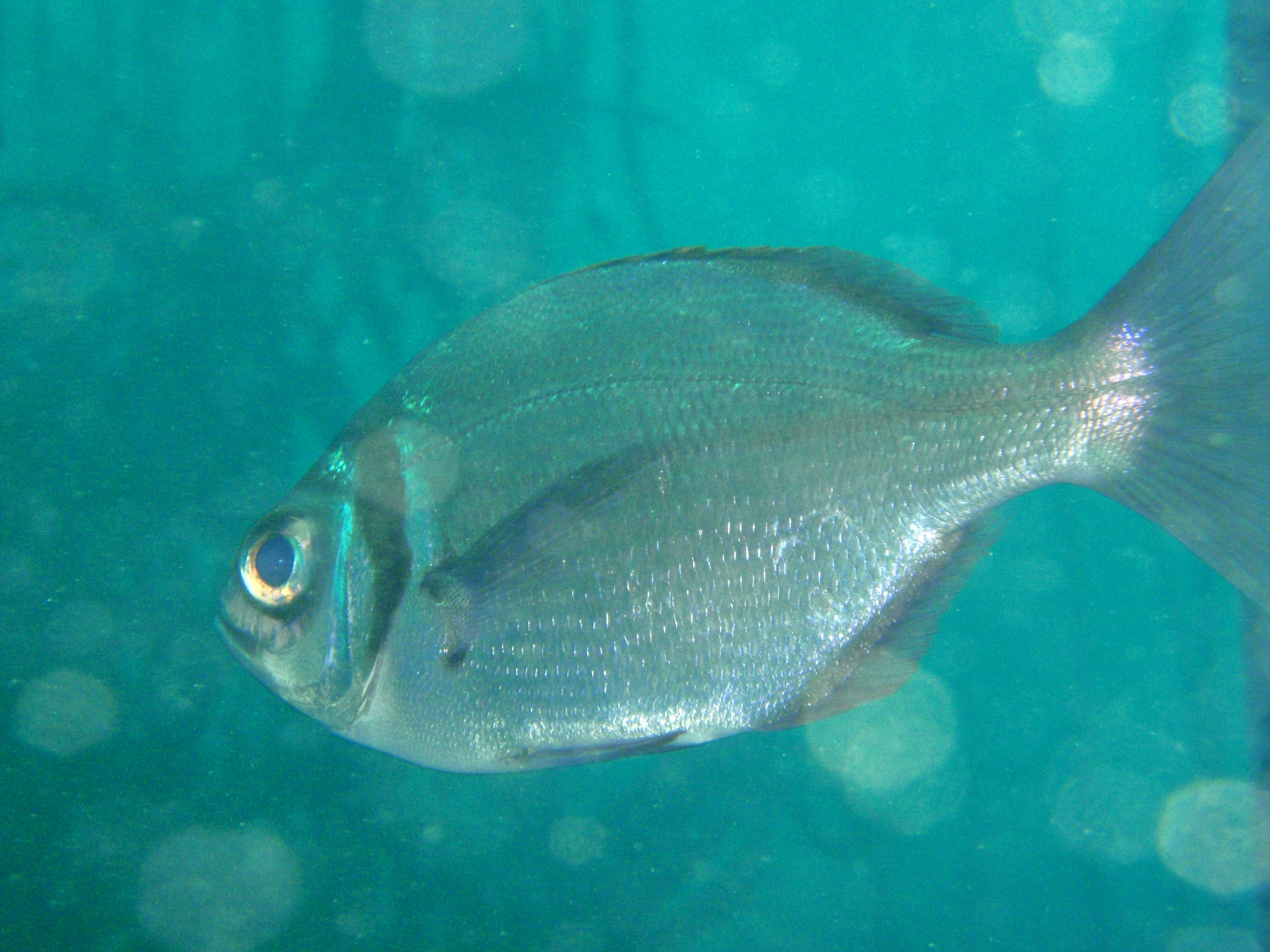

Conservation status
- Least Concern (IUCN 3.1)

Scientific classification
- Kingdom: Animalia
- Phylum: Chordata
- Class: Actinopterygii
- Division: Teleostei
- Order: Acanthuriformes
- Family: Sparidae
- Genus: Boopsoidea; Castelnau, 1861
- Species: B. inornata

Binomial name
- Boopsoidea inornata Castelnau, 1861

Synonyms
- Pagrus holubi Steindachner, 1881

= Boopsoidea =

Species of sea breeam (fish)

Booposoidea is a monospecific genus of marine ray-finned fish belonging to the family Sparidae, the seabreams and porgies. The only species in the genus is Boopsoidea inornata, the Fransmadam or Karel grootoog, which is endemic to the southwestern Indian Ocean off South Africa.

== Taxonomy ==
Booposoidea was first proposed as a genus in 1861 by the French naturalist François-Louis Laporte, comte de Castelnau when he described its only species, B. inornata. Castelnau gave the type locality of B. inornata as Kalk Bay and Algoa Bay in South Africa. This taxon is placed in the family Sparidae within the order Spariformes by the 5th edition of Fishes of the World. Some authorities classify this genus in the subfamily Pagellinae, but the 5th edition of Fishes of the World does not recognise subfamilies within the Sparidae.

== Etymology ==
Boopsoidea means "having the form of Boops." Castelnau described this taxon as having the same overall shape as the bogue. The specific name inornata means "unadorned" and is an allusion Castelnau did not explain but it may refer to the absence of spots and stripes on this fish.

== Distribution ==
Booposoidea is endemic to the southewestern Indian Ocean off the coast of South Africa between Kalk Bay on the eastern coast of the Cape Peninsula to Aliwal Shoal in KwaZulu-Natal.

== Description ==
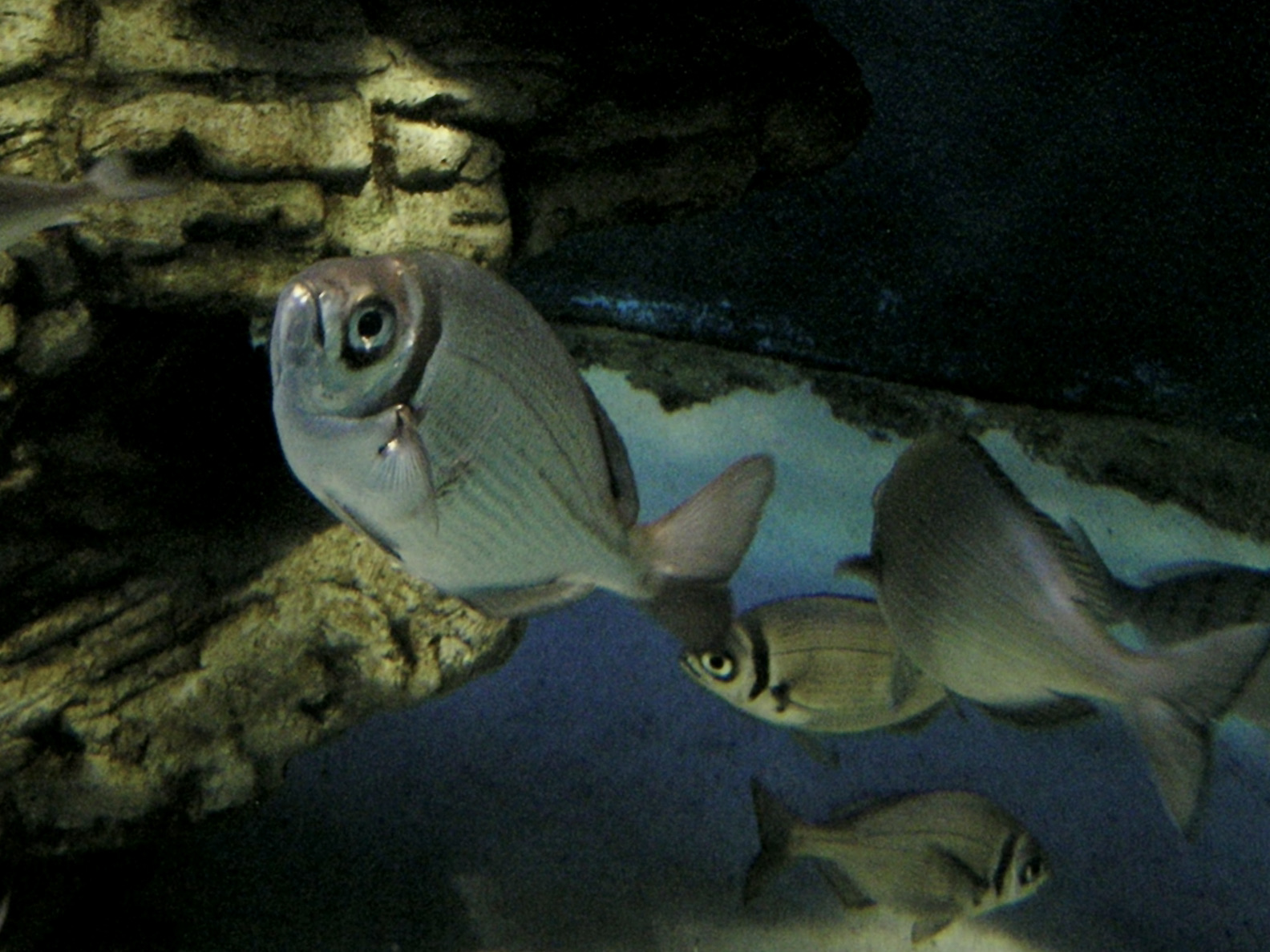
Boopsoidea inornata

A deep bodied fish with a pointed head and large eyes. Its adult body colour is bronze to silver with a distinctive dark edge to the gill covers. Small juveniles are a reddish orange, fading with growth to silvery with orange to yellow fins. Length is up to 30 cm, and weight seldom exceeds 0.4 kg.

=== Diagnostics ===
Depth 2 to 2.3 in standard length. Dorsal fin with 11 spines, 10 to 11 rays. Anal fin has 11 rays. Pectoral fins have 15 to 16 rays, and are longer than the head. Lateral line has 56 to 65 conspicuous scales.

== Habitat ==
Usually on rocky reefs in depths of about 5 to 35 m. B. inornata is omnivorous, and prefers small sand- and reef-dwelling prey. Intake of algae and small fish is relatively small. Adults feed on tunicates, polychaete worms, crustaceans (amphipods, decapods, isopods and mysids), molluscs, bryozoans, plankton and seaweeds for their animal encrustations. Its preferred temperature range is 17.6 - 27.5 °C.

== Life cycle ==
Boopsoidea inornata is a rudimentary hermaphrodite. It is a long lived, polygamous, resident species. Females spawn throughout the year, but mostly in spring. The eggs are pelagic and have been found in shelf waters in the Tsitskamma National Park. Females mature at 178 mm FL, compared to 185 mm FL for males. Predated by large fish like red steenbras and kob. Nineteen parasite taxa are known to infect B. inornata and include myxozoan, monogenean, digenean, cestode, nematode, copepod and isopod examples.

== Importance to humans ==
Boopsoidea inornata is often part of recreational and commercial skiboat catches in the southeastern and southwestern Cape. It is usually used as bait for larger gamefish, but is also used for food when larger reef fish species are depleted. It is also often caught by shore anglers in the Eastern Cape and Western Cape.

== Conservation status ==
Least concern
