= Dave Knudson =

Dave Knudson may refer to:

- Dave Knudson (guitarist) (fl. 1990s–2020s), guitarist for Minus The Bear (ex-Botch)
- Dave Knudson (politician) (born 1950), South Dakota State Senate Majority Leader and candidate for governor
