= Franz S. Leichter =

American politician (1930–2023)

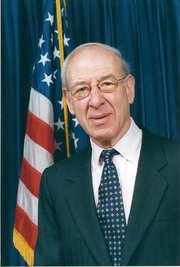

Member of the New York Banking Board
- In office June 3, 2009 – October 3, 2011
- Nominated by: David Paterson
- Succeeded by: Board abolished

Director of the Federal Housing Finance Board
- In office August 2000 – February 27, 2006
- Nominated by: Bill Clinton (Recess, 2000); George W. Bush (2001)
- Preceded by: Daniel F. Evans Jr.
- Succeeded by: Geoffrey S. Bacino

Member of the New York Senate
- In office January 1, 1975 – December 31, 1998
- Preceded by: Joseph Zaretzki
- Succeeded by: Eric Schneiderman
- Constituency: 30th District (1993-98); 28th District (1983-92); 29th District (1975-82)

Member of the New York Assembly
- In office January 1, 1969 – December 31, 1974
- Preceded by: Daniel M. Kelly
- Succeeded by: George W. Miller
- Constituency: 71st District (1973-74); 69th District (1969-73)

Personal details
- Born: Franz Sigmund Leichter; August 19, 1930 Vienna, Austria
- Died: June 11, 2023 (aged 92) New York City, U.S.
- Party: Democratic
- Spouses: Nina Williams (m. 1958; died 1995) Melody Anderson (m. 2001; died 2010)
- Children: 2
- Website: www.franzleichter.com

Franz Sigmund Leichter (August 19, 1930 – June 11, 2023) was an American politician from the state of New York who served in the New York State Assembly from 1969 to 1974 and the New York State Senate from 1975 to 1998.

== Early life and education ==
Leichter was born in Vienna, Austria. He came to the United States as a refugee from German-occupied Europe in 1940 with his father and brother. According to an August 19, 2020, article posted on the American Friends of the Documentation Center of Austrian Resistance, when "the German Wehrmacht overran France in May 1940," Leichter, his father and his brother "fled Paris;" and "after some weeks in Montauban, they left France with a forged exit certificate, traveled across Spain to Lisbon, and took a Greek steamer to the United States," where "Muriel Gardiner, one of the greatest rescuers of Austrian refugees in the US, helped the two sons gain admission to a boarding school in Connecticut."

His mother Käthe Leichter (1895–1942) was a leading sociologist and feminist. She was arrested by the Gestapo in 1938, sent to the Ravensbrück concentration camp and killed in 1942. The Government of Austria has conferred an annual Käthe Leichter Award in her honor since 1992. His father, Otto Leichter, died in New York City in 1973. His brother Henry O. Leichter, born 1924 in Austria, a lawyer, died in New York City in 2010. Franz had two children, Katherine and Joshua, and four grandchildren, Memphis, Ethan, Otto, and Theo.

Leichter attended New York City's public schools and graduated from Swarthmore College, magna cum laude, in 1952. He received his Doctor of Law from Harvard Law School in 1957 after serving in the U.S. Army in Japan.

== Public service ==
=== New York State Assembly ===
Leichter, a Democrat, was first elected to the New York State Assembly in November 1968. He remained in the Assembly until 1974, sitting in the 178th, 179th, and 180th New York State Legislatures. He drafted a bill expanding abortion rights together with Republican Assemblywoman Constance Cook of upstate Tompkins County, New York, proposing legislation that included no restrictions on the practice of abortion. The bill passed in the Senate on March 18, 1970, after five hours of debate by a vote of 31–26. For the Assembly, the bill was amended to allow for women to have abortions until their 24th week of pregnancy or at any time to protect the life of the mother. The Cook-Leichter bill was the first in the nation to legalize abortion. This law influenced the U.S. Supreme Court ruling in its landmark January 1973 Roe v. Wade decision.

=== New York State Senate ===
Leichter won election to the State Senate in 1974 after he defeated incumbent Senate Minority Leader Joseph Zaretzki in the Democratic primary. Leichter remained in the Senate until 1998, sitting in the 181st, 182nd, 183rd, 184th, 185th, 186th, 187th, 188th, 189th, 190th, 191st, and 192nd New York State Legislatures.

In the Legislature, Leichter was known as a maverick who fought for reform and effective ethical standards. For his outspoken criticism of how the Legislature operated, and his willingness to take on powerful interests such as New York City's banking and real estate industries, and the leadership of the Democratic and Republican parties, he was often referred to as "the conscience of the Senate".

Leichter took on many causes. He introduced the New York City canine waste law, commonly known as the "pooper-scooper" law, which requires dog owners in New York City to clean up after their pets. Since its enactment in 1979, similar laws have been adopted throughout the country.

Leichter was a strong consumer advocate. As ranking Democrat on the Senate Banking Committee, he sought to advance the interests of consumers and to block harmful legislation. Among his major achievements was the law that required banks to promptly credit their customers with checks when deposited instead of holding the amounts for days while using the money for their own profit, the first such law in the country. A few years after New York State ended this practice, the United States Congress followed suit.

For many years he issued a popular Consumer's Guide to Banks to help empower consumers with information on how to avoid excessive charges and hidden fees. He also published a similar Consumer's Guide to Credit Cards. He frequently called attention to hidden bank and credit card charges and other practices that were costly to consumers. Active in support of affordable housing, Leichter pushed the Legislature to pass the "warranty of habitability" to protect tenants from dangerous and unsanitary conditions. He was a leading advocate for tenants' rights and a vocal supporter of New York's rent regulations to protect affordable housing.

Leichter fought for campaign finance reform and was credited with playing a key role in the establishment of New York City's campaign finance law. He was instrumental in abolishing wasteful and inefficient tax subsidies to businesses by New York State and New York City.

Leichter was a major proponent of establishing parks and green space to provide community access to the Hudson River waterfront, both within New York City and in the Hudson valley. He co-authored with Assemblyman Richard Gottfried legislation that created Manhattan's Hudson River Park and led the effort that established Riverbank State Park in Harlem. The Hudson River Park now stretches from Battery Park City to 59th Street along the Hudson River. The park has replaced rotting piers and a derelict waterfront with acres of greenery, with areas for both quiet space and active recreational use that has brought thousands of New Yorkers and visitors back to the waterfront. The Riverbank State Park, which was built at Leichter's urging on top of a waste water treatment plant, stretches for ten blocks along Harlem's shore of the Hudson River. Riverbank is visited annually by more than 3 million people and is the third most-used State park in New York.

In 1990, Leichter drafted and introduced the first state bill anywhere in the country providing for domestic partnerships, primarily to expand civil rights for lesbian and gay people in the absence of their right to marriage. While his bill did not pass it helped move to the forefront the effort to achieve equal rights for gays and lesbians. New York State adopted the same-sex marriage law in 2011.

As a Democrat serving in the minority party his entire legislative career, Leichter described his strategy as "raising issues", which he accomplished through aggressive debate on the Senate floor, extensive research reports, and frequent news conferences in the Senate lobby and on the steps of New York City Hall. His districts covered portions of the western sides of Manhattan and the Bronx. His stands and independence resulted in the Democratic and Republican leadership twice reapportioning him so his home was outside his district. Both times he ran in newly structured districts to retain his seat.

Leichter announced his retirement from the Senate in 1998 at age 67, and was succeeded by Eric Schneiderman, who went on to be elected as New York State Attorney General in 2010.

In 2000 he was nominated by President Bill Clinton as a Director of the Federal Housing Finance Board (FHFB), which was the regulator of the Home Loan Bank System. Leichter began his service in August 2000 with a recess appointment from the President. He was then re-nominated by President George W. Bush and confirmed by the U.S. Senate. Leichter served until July 2006 when his term expired.

Leichter was nominated in 2009 by Governor David Paterson to serve on New York State's Banking Board. He was confirmed by the New York State Senate and served as a member until its elimination in 2011.

=== Practicing attorney ===
Leichter was a practicing attorney for 50 years, specializing in commercial litigation and in representing foreign clients. Among others, he represented Brazilian and Mexican Banks. He was associated with various law firms, including Wachtell Manheim & Grouf and until his service on the Federal Housing Finance Board with Walter Conston, Alexander & Green (now part of Alston & Bird).

Leichter was a Director of the Hudson River Park Trust Board, which is constructing a park along the Hudson River in Manhattan, New York.

== Personal life and death ==
Leichter was married to Nina Williams in 1958. She died by suicide in 1997; he later married Melody Anderson in 2001. He had two children. Leichter appeared in the 2012 film Here One Day, directed by daughter Kathy Leichter, about the 1995 suicide of Leichter's wife and Kathy's mother Nina.

Leichter suffered from congestive heart failure in his later years. He died from pneumonia and renal failure at a hospital in Manhattan, on June 11, 2023. He was 92.

New York State Assembly
Preceded by Daniel M. Kelly	New York State Assembly; 69th District; 1969–1972	Succeeded by Albert H. Blumenthal
Preceded by Stephen S. Gottlieb	New York State Assembly; 71st District; 1973–1974	Succeeded by George W. Miller
New York State Senate
Preceded by Joseph Zaretzki	New York State Senate; 29th District; 1975–1982	Succeeded by Leon Bogues
Preceded by Leon Bogues	New York State Senate; 28th District; 1983–1992	Succeeded by Olga A. Méndez
Preceded by Olga A. Méndez	New York State Senate; 30th District; 1993–1998	Succeeded by Eric Schneiderman
