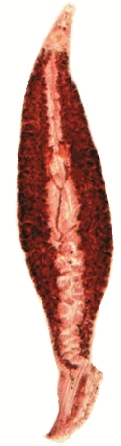
- Microcotyle isyebi

Scientific classification
- Kingdom: Animalia
- Phylum: Platyhelminthes
- Class: Monogenea
- Order: Mazocraeidea
- Family: Microcotylidae
- Genus: Microcotyle
- Species: M. isyebi

Binomial name
- Microcotyle isyebi Bouguerche, Gey, Justine & Tazerouti, 2019

= Microcotyle isyebi =

Species of worms

Microcotyle isyebi is a species of monogenean, parasitic on the gills of a marine fish. It belongs to the family Microcotylidae.

== Systematics ==
Microcotyle isyebi was described and illustrated by Bouguerche et al., based on and 31 specimens (including one with molecular information), from the gills of the bogue Boops boops (Sparidae) collected at Bouharoune off the Algerian coast. The study that led to the description of M. isyebi, was derived from the atypical situation of Microcotyle erythrini. M. erythrini has been recorded from several fish host species in the Mediterranean Sea and Atlantic Ocean, unlike many species which are considered strictly specific. This could indicate a true lack of specificity or that several cryptic species are involved. In a partial attempt to solve this issue, specimens of a monogenean resembling M. erythrini were collected from bogues, Boops boops, caught off Algeria. A comparison with previous published descriptions and also with museum specimens of M. erythrini did not yield clear morphological difference. But sequences of cytochrome c oxidase subunit I (COI) differed by 16.3% from that of M. erythrini available in GenBank and collected from the type-host Pagellus erythrinus, which indicate that the species was different. The species from B. boops was thus described as Microcotyle isyebi.

== Description ==
Microcotyle isyebi has the general morphology of all species of Microcotyle, with a symmetrical elongate body and a narrow anterior end, comprising an anterior part which contains most organs and a posterior part called the haptor. The haptor is triangular, subsymmetrical or symmetrical, and bears 54–102 clamps, arranged in 2 equal or sub-equal lateral rows, one on each side. The clamps of the haptor attach the animal to the gill of the fish. There are also two septate oval buccal suckers at the anterior extremity, provided with a row of tiny papillae visible on ventral rims. The digestive organs include an anterior, terminal mouth, a small subspherical pharynx, a long thin oesophagus without lateral diverticula and a posterior intestine that bifurcates at the level of the genital atrium in two lateral branches apparently fused just anterior to the haptor; the left branch extends into haptor for a short distance. Each adult contains male and female reproductive organs. The reproductive organs include an anterior genital atrium, comprising the anterior atrium proper and two posterior "pockets". The atrium proper is shaped as an inverted heart, armed with numerous conical spines of similar sizes; the spines are denser in the centre than in lateral parts, arranged as one main anterior group and two postero-lateral smaller groups called “pockets”, a vagina with a middorsal pore visible in most specimens, posterior to genital atrium, a single complex ovary and 13–29 testes, subspherical to oval, post-ovarian, occurring in 2 rows generally intercaecal, limited to posterior half of body proper. The eggs are fusiform with two filaments at both ends, often coiled. Three sequences of the cox1 gene has been published.

== Etymology ==
The species name, isyebi refers to "ISYEB", an acronym for "Institut de Systématique, Évolution, Biodiversité" as an acknowledgement of the help offered to the first author.

== Hosts and localities ==
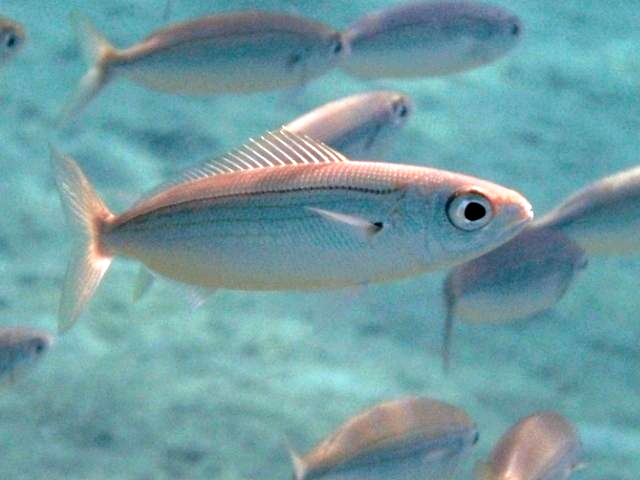
The bogue Boops boops is the type host of Microcotyle isyebi

The type-host and only recorded host is the bogue (Boops boops, Sparidae). The identity of the fish host was confirmed by barcoding. The type-locality is off Algeria.
