= Dave Knudson (politician) =

American politician

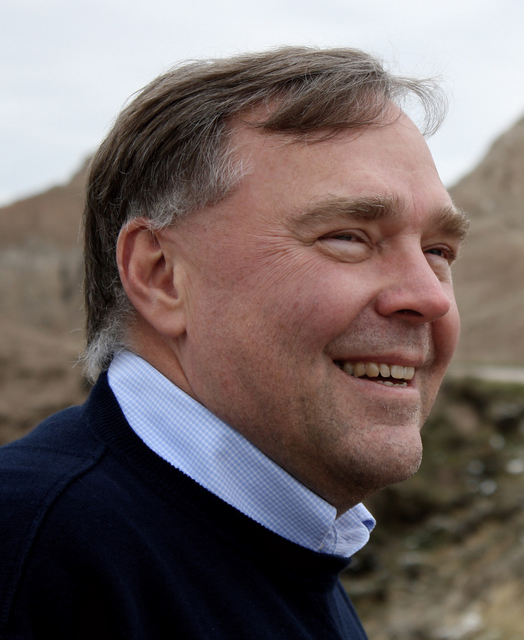

Majority Leader of the South Dakota Senate
- In office 2007–2011
- Preceded by: Eric Bogue
- Succeeded by: Russell Olson

Member of the South Dakota Senate from the 14th district
- In office 2003–2011
- Preceded by: Barbara Everist

Personal details
- Born: April 30, 1950 (age 76) Yankton, South Dakota, U.S.
- Party: Republican
- Spouse: De Knudson
- Children: Mark Knudson; Michael Knudson
- Education: Harvard University (B.A.); New York University (J.D.); University of South Dakota (MBA)
- Occupation: Lawyer
- Website: Website

David L. Knudson (born April 30, 1950) is an American lawyer, former Majority Leader of the South Dakota Senate, and a member of the Republican Party.

== Early life and education ==
Knudson was born and raised in Yankton, South Dakota, and graduated from Yankton High School.

Knudson majored in government and philosophy at Harvard University, and graduated with honors in 1972. Following college, he attended New York University School of Law on a full scholarship through the Root-Tilden Scholar program, and graduated in 1975. Knudson received his Master of Business Administration from the University of South Dakota in 1981.

Knudson resides in Sioux Falls with his wife De, a former member of the Sioux Falls City Council. They married in 1976, and have two sons.

== 2010 gubernatorial election ==
On December 21, 2008, Knudson filed paperwork with South Dakota Secretary of State to start a campaign committee to seek the Republican nomination for governor in 2010.
