= Walker, South Dakota =

- Unincorporated community
- Location within the state of South Dakota Walker (the United States)
- Coordinates: 45°54′37″N 101°05′25″W
- Country: United States
- State: South Dakota
- County: Corson
- Elevation: 2,172 ft (662 m)
- Time zone: UTC-6 (Central (CST))
  - Summer (DST): UTC-5 (CDT)
- ZIP codes: 57659
- GNIS feature ID: 1261151

Walker is an unincorporated community in Corson County, South Dakota, United States. Although not tracked by the Census Bureau, Walker has been assigned the ZIP code of 57659.

The community was named for a local cattleman.

== Notable person ==
- Former state legislator Ted Klaudt
