= Here One Day =

- Directed by: Kathy Leichter
- Produced by: Kathy Leichter
- Starring: Franz S. Leichter; Kathy Leichter; Nina Leichter
- Cinematography: Kirsten Johnson
- Edited by: Pola Rapaport
- Production company: Two Suns Media
- Release date: November 13, 2012 (IDFA)
- Running time: 76 minutes
- Country: United States
- Language: English

Here One Day is a 2012 documentary film on the life and suicide of Nina Leichter, the wife of politician Franz S. Leichter. It was directed by their daughter, Kathy Leichter.
