= Ted Klaudt =

American politician

Ted A. Klaudt

Member of the South Dakota House of Representatives from the 28th district
- In office 1999–2006
- Preceded by: Kenneth Wetz
- Succeeded by: Betty Olson

Personal details
- Born: April 9, 1958 (age 68) Walker, South Dakota
- Party: Republican
- Spouse: Connie Klaudt
- Children: 2 foster daughters; 1 biological
- Profession: Farmer, rancher, former state legislator

Ted Alvin Klaudt (born April 9, 1958) is an American convicted rapist, farmer, rancher, and former Republican member of the South Dakota House of Representatives (1999–2006) from Walker, South Dakota, United States. In November 2007 he was convicted of four counts of raping his two foster daughters.

== Legislative career ==
Klaudt was a Republican member of the South Dakota House of Representatives from 1999 to 2006 when he was "termed out" of his seat which was filled by Betty Olson. Klaudt decided to run for the state Senate but was defeated by Democrat Ryan Maher.

While in office, Klaudt co-sponsored several bills that regulated sex offenders, including the establishment of "community safety zones" prohibiting sex offenders from residing, working, or entering within 500 feet of schools, public parks and swimming pools. He also co-sponsored the bill that required South Dakota to be included in the National Sex Offender Registry, a bill that requires the Department of Social Services to inform parents about abuse or neglect involving their children in state custody. His bill to have prohibited the distribution of birth control to high school students was defeated.

== Child sexual abuse ==
=== Indictment and arrest ===
On May 19, 2007, Klaudt was arrested on allegations that he had raped and sexually abused his foster daughters, 17 and 19 years old at the time. He was charged with eight counts of rape, two counts of sexual exploitation of a minor, two counts of witness tampering, sexual contact with a person under 16 (South Dakota's age of consent), and stalking, charges stemming from his activities in Corson and Hughes counties.

Klaudt entered no plea during his two court appearances following his arrest, so the judge entered not guilty pleas on his behalf, setting his bail bond at US$100,000; Klaudt posted the required ten percent to make bail and was released. On June 15, he was formally indicted on four felony counts of second-degree rape by the grand jury in Hughes County; he entered a not guilty plea to the indictment July 11.

=== Trial and conviction ===
Klaudt's trial on these charges started October 30, 2007 at the Hughes County Courthouse. On November 7, the defense rested and the 12-person jury retired to deliberate. Three hours later, the jury convicted Klaudt on all four counts of second-degree rape. He was sentenced on January 17, 2008, to 44 years in prison: 11 years per count, to be served consecutively.

Klaudt also pleaded guilty to witness tampering, and was sentenced to an additional ten years' imprisonment.

In 2017, he lost a bid for a new trial.

== "Copyrighting" his name ==
In December 2009, Ted Klaudt sent a "Common Law Copyright Notice" to the Associated Press and various state media outlets warning that use of his name, Ted Klaudt, without permission is a violation of a common-law copyright of a trade name or trademark and could result in a judgment against the offender of up to US$500,000. Laura Malone, associated general counsel for intellectual property at The Associated Press, noted that the names of individuals, including Ted Klaudt, cannot be protected under copyright law.
