= Zelma Bogue =

American politician in California

Mayor of Glendale, California
- In office April 1957 – April 1959
- Preceded by: John M. Lawson
- Succeeded by: E. C. Cannon

Personal details
- Born: 1880; Veedersburg, Indiana
- Died: 1975 (aged 94–95)
- Spouse: J. Livingston Bogue
- Known for: First councilwoman in Glendale, California, First woman mayor of Glendale, California

Zelma Bogue (1880 – 1975) was an American politician from California. Bogue was the first female mayor of Glendale, California.

== Early life ==
In 1880, Bogue was born in Veedersburg, Indiana. Bogue's father was a building contractor.

== Career ==
Bogue started her career designing, building, and selling homes in Glendale, California.

In 1953, Bogue won the election and became a member of city council for Glendale, California. Bogue was the first woman elected to the city council. In 1957, as incumbent, Bogue was re-elected as a member of city council for Glendale, California. In April 1957, Bogue became the first woman mayor of Glendale, California, until April 1959. Bogue served as a member of the city council in Glendale, California until 1965.

== Personal life ==
Vogue's husband was J. Livingston Bogue. In 1926, Bogue and her husband moved to Glendale, California. They had two daughters, Neva and Olivetta.

In July 1975, Bogue died at Glendale Adventist Hospital in Glendale, California. She was 94 years old.
