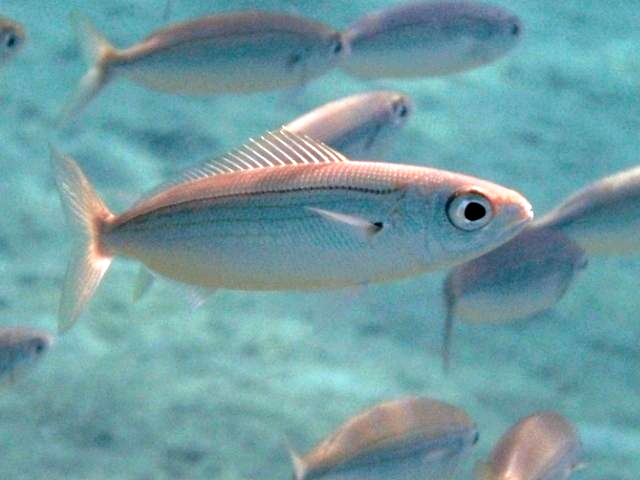
- School of bogues off the coast of Greece

Conservation status
- Least Concern (IUCN 3.1)

Scientific classification
- Kingdom: Animalia
- Phylum: Chordata
- Class: Actinopterygii
- Division: Teleostei
- Order: Acanthuriformes
- Family: Sparidae
- Genus: Boops
- Species: B. boops

Binomial name
- Boops boops (Linnaeus, 1758)

Synonyms
- Boops canariensis (Valenciennes, 1839); Box boops (Linnaeus, 1758); Box vulgaris (Valenciennes, 1830); Sparus boops Linnaeus, 1758

= Boops boops =

Species of seabream

Boops boops (/ˈboʊ.ɒps/ BOH-ops; from Ancient Greek βόωψ, lit. 'ox-eyed'), commonly called the bogue, bogue bream, or boce, is a species of seabream native to the eastern Atlantic.

== Taxonomy ==
In the fourth century BCE, Boops boops was documented by Aristotle as box (Ancient Greek: βῶξ) in his Historia Animalium. The common name boce is thus ultimately derived from the Greek via the Latin bōca. In the early third century CE, Athenaeus, in his Deipnosophistae, also called the fish box and suggested that the name came from the sound that the fish makes (Ancient Greek: βοή, lit. 'roar'). The name boops (Ancient Greek: βόωψ, lit. 'ox-eyed') is mentioned due to the fish's large "bug" eyes. The first scientific description comes from Carl Linnaeus in the tenth edition of Systema Naturae as Sparus boops. It was later reclassified under the genus Boops.

== Distribution and habitat ==
The species is found off the coasts of Europe, Africa, the Azores and the Canary Islands, from Norway to Angola, and in the Mediterranean and Black Seas. It avoids brackish waters such as the Baltic Sea. A demersal and semi-pelagic feeder, it can generally be found at a depth of 100 m (330 ft), and infrequently down to 350 m (1,150 ft).

== Ecology ==
It consumes seaweed, crustaceans, and some plankton, in schools that rise to the surface at night. Individuals can reach 36 cm (14 in), but average 20 cm (7.9 in).

Sex determination in the bogue is unclear. It has variously been described as a rudimentary intersex organism, with a few intersex individuals, or a protogynous intersex, with individuals starting out life as females, and some becoming male later on.

== Human use ==
The species is commercially fished, with 37,830 tonnes taken in 2008. European Commission standards include three size categories for Boops boops, from size 3, which is between 32 and 70 fish per kilogram, to size 1, which is no more than 5 fish per kilogram.

When cleaned and cooked through the pan-fried, broiled or baked fresh methods, Boops boops have been described as good tasting, but when stored, the fishes’ gut microbiota rapidly spread undesired flavors to the rest of the body.

Their shelf life is limited, as when stored at freezing (0 °C) for a week, or slightly above freezing for 2 to 4 days, the taste after cooking becomes of "unacceptable quality". Much of the catch is used for fishmeal or tuna fishing bait. Boops boops has been used as an indicator of microplastic pollution in the Mediterranean Sea.

== Parasites ==
The bogue is host to a wide variety of parasites, ranging from metazoans such as monogenean flatworms (e.g. Microcotyle isyebi and Cyclocotyla bellones) acanthocephalan spiny-headed worms, nematode roundworms, isopod and copepod crustaceans and myxozoan cnidarians to the unicellular dinoflagellate Ichthyodinium chabelardi, a parasite lethal to eggs developing in ovaries. At least 67 metazoan parasite species have been reported from the species. In the aftermath of the 2002 Prestige oil spill, the community of parasitic species inhabiting bogue caught off the coast of Spain was noticeably altered.

== Gallery ==
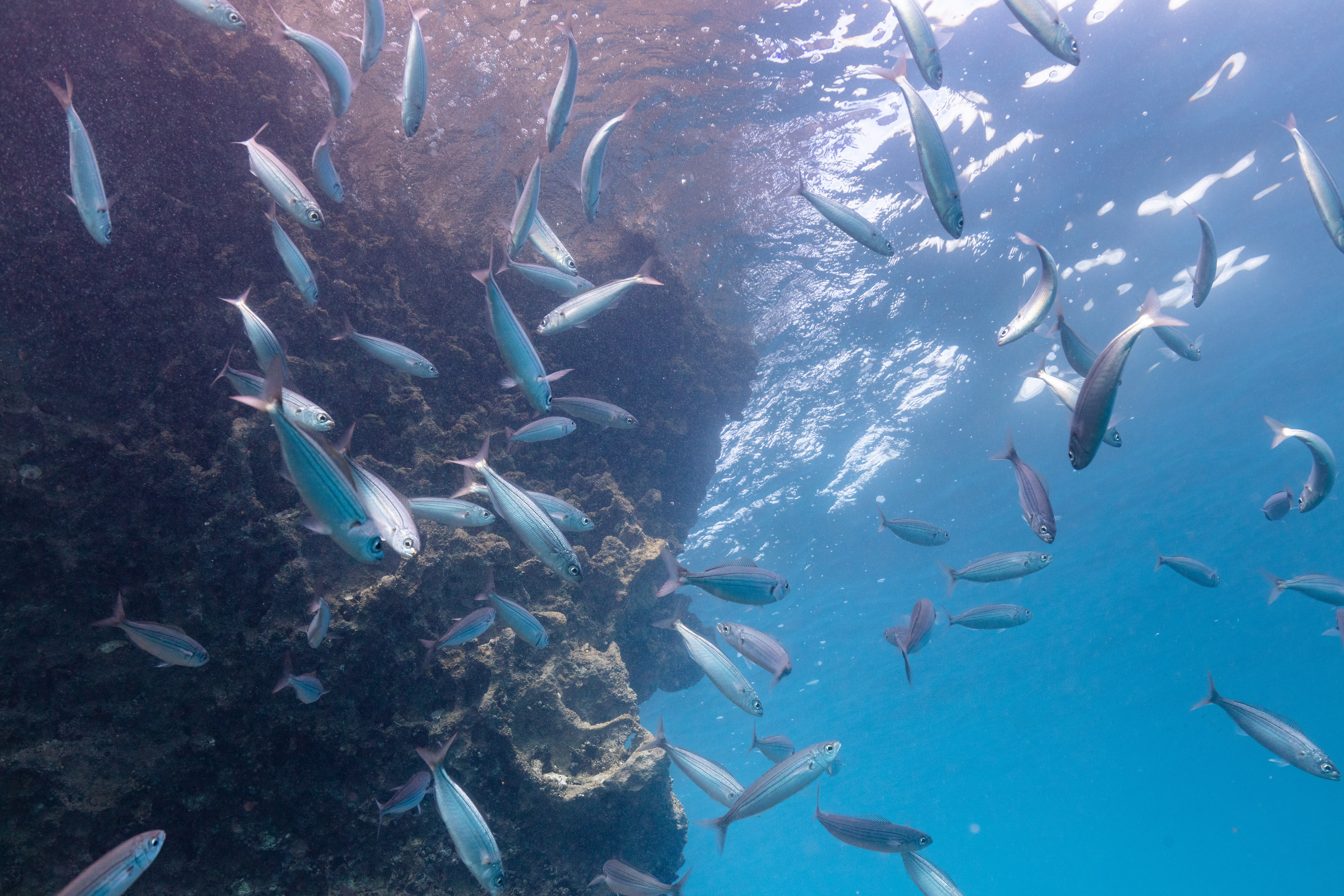
School of bogues nearby Mouro Island

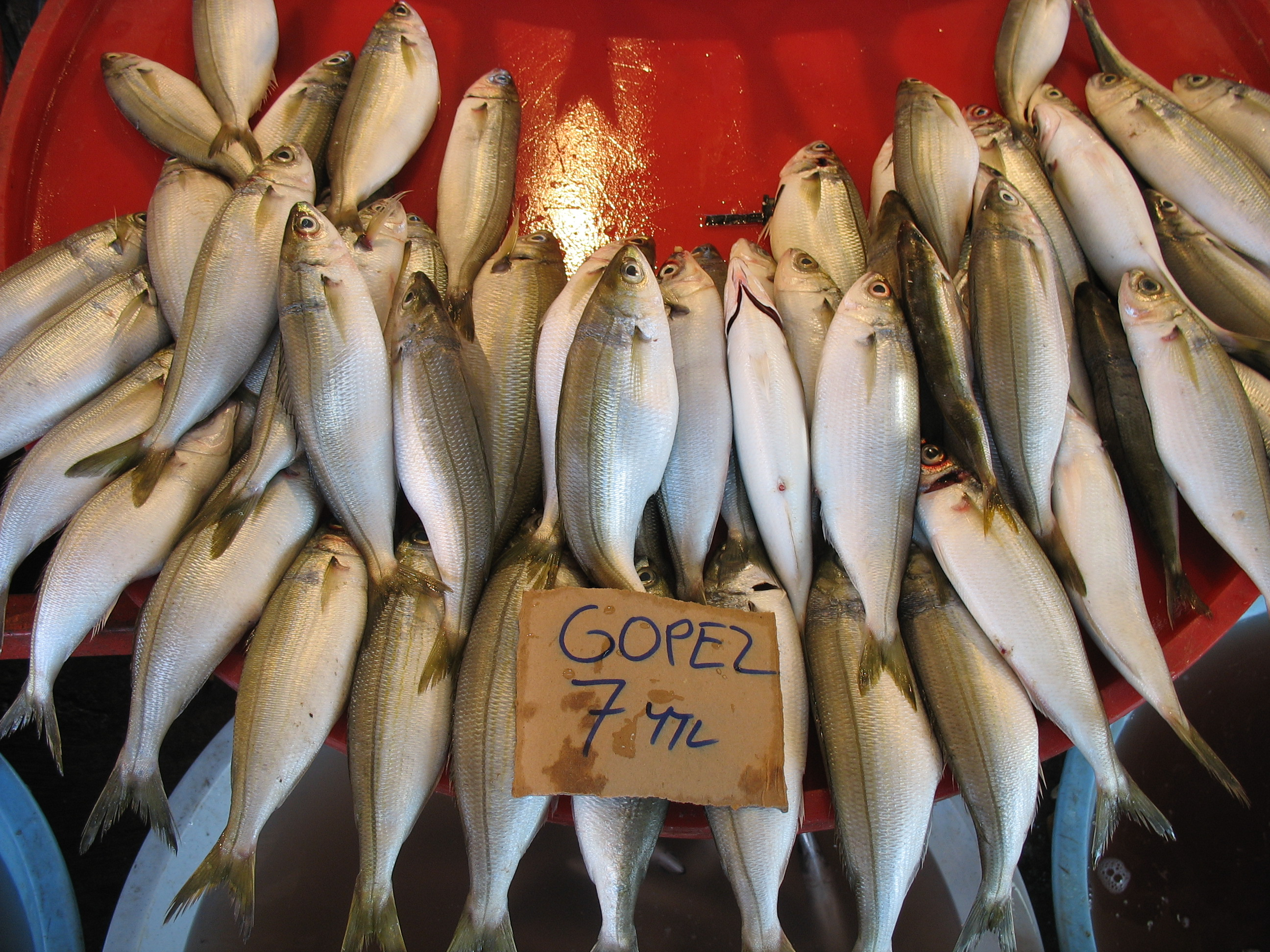
Bogues for sale in Turkey

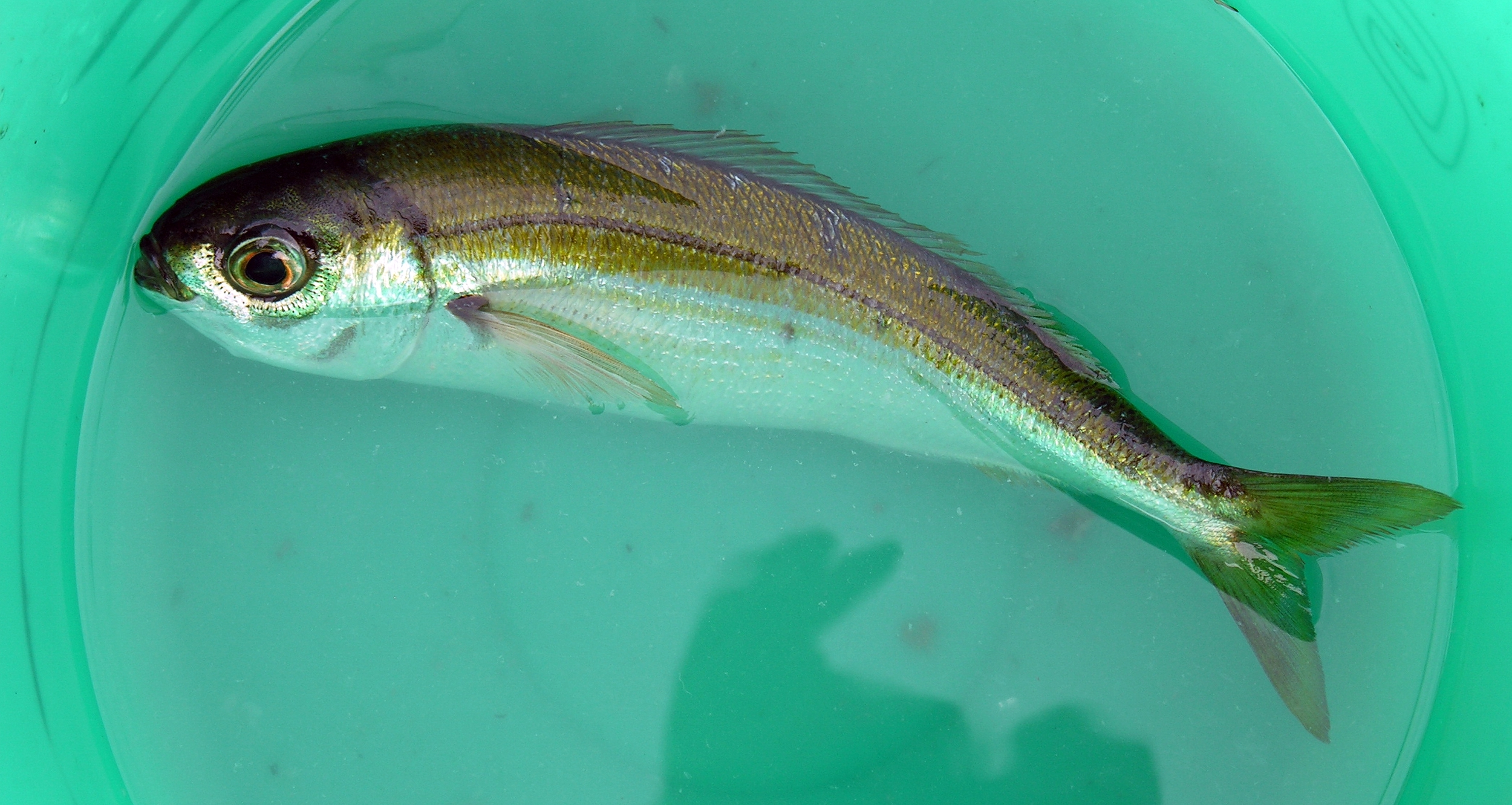
Boops boops in a bucket
