= Kenneth Wetz =

American politician

Member of the South Dakota House of Representatives from the 28th district
- In office January 14, 1997 – January 9, 2001
- Succeeded by: Tom Van Norman

Personal details
- Born: June 21, 1948 (age 78) Vale, South Dakota
- Party: Republican

Kenneth Wetz (born June 21, 1948) is an American politician who served in the South Dakota House of Representatives from the 28th district from 1997 to 2001.
