= Sydney Uriah Bogues =

Jamaican Pharmacist (born 1883)

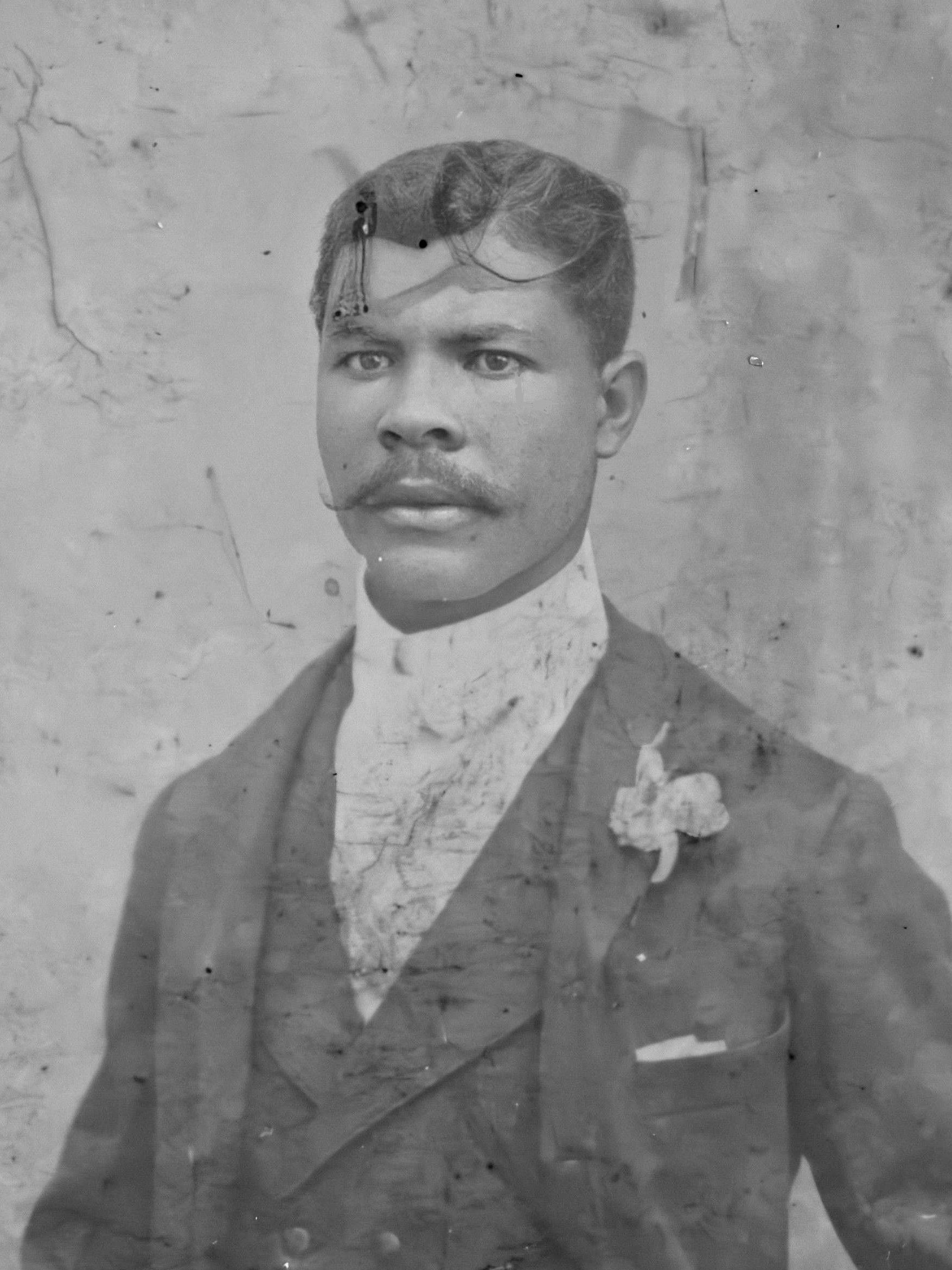
- Bogues, c. 1923
- Born: Sydney Uriah Bogues; May 3, 1883; Barton's, St.Catherine, Jamaica
- Died: November 6, 1954 (aged 71); Spanish Town, Saint Catherine, Jamaica
- Occupation: Pharmacist
- Spouse: Florence Matilda Billings (m. 1910)
- Children: 8, including H.E.Dorrien, Francis, and David

Sydney Uriah Bogues (/ˈboʊɡzj/ BOHG-s; May 3, 1883 – November 6, 1954) was a Jamaican pharmacist and a modern thinker during the Harlem Renaissance in 1920’s New York. He was also a contemporary of Rt. Exc. Marcus Garvey and the uncle of New York State Senator Leon Franklin Bogues.

== Family background ==
S.U. Bogues was born and raised at the family homestead at a place known as Dark Hole in Bellas Gate, St. Catherine. Situated in a large hollow on the side of a mountain facing Point Hill about (10) miles North of Old Harbour, Dark Hole has been for centuries where the Bogues' lived and buried several generations.

He was the son of William Benjamin Bogues and Anna Rebecca Bogues née DeLattibodier. William B. Bogues was born in Bellas Gate and was at least the 2nd Generation to live there. The family lays claim that S.U. Bogues' grandfather, McDuff Hart Bogue was from Clan MacDuff which is the highest-ranking family and is Scottish royalty. The MacDuff Family crest, a red rampant lion also signifies royalty in the Royal Banner.

S.U. Bogues and his brothers, Egbert and Leopold helped their father, William Benjamin with farming and maintaining the Stamford Hill gold mine there on the property which ceased operation about (2) decades prior to their birth. Even to this day international prospectors mine for copper and gold the area. There is still a riveted old wood-fired steam boiler there from the 1850s. The steam was the only power at the time to pump water out of the mine to prevent flooding.

The exploration of the Stamford Hill Prospect was done originally by the Clarendon Consolidated Copper Mining Company of Jamaica which started in 1852-53 and continued till 1863. The mine was abandoned after the death of a mine captain, the failure of the pumps, and several other inadequacies experienced at the time.

Sydney Uriah's Mother, Anna Rebecca came from an orthodox Jewish family heritage of whom were likely lawyers concerning the gold mine. Although she was born in the 1850s, as late as the early 2000's some of her grandsons who could still describe her, say that she was a short lady with long straight hair, and she had a dark skin complexion. Some of the DeLattibodier in Bellas Gate originated a few generations back to freed slaves. Some family trees have her as the Great Granddaughter of Penny Sergeant, mulatto plantation owner and her husband Israel Levien. Historically, slaves born of Jewish descendants were often still treated as children of Abraham and were cared for as such.

S.U. Bogues later met Helen Hill, before his marriage to Florence Matilda Billings. They had a daughter in 1905, Wilhel Louise Bogues, more affectionately known as Aunt Lola to those in the more recent generations.

Between the 18th and 19th centuries family oral tradition says there were (3) original Scottish settlers from the Bogue family to the "New World". They were (3) brothers, one settled there in St. Catherine (which was St. Dorothy at the time,) one settled in Bogue, St. James, and one went to the colonies of the now, United States (likely North Carolina where there are several Scottish Bogue settlers.)

== Education and career ==
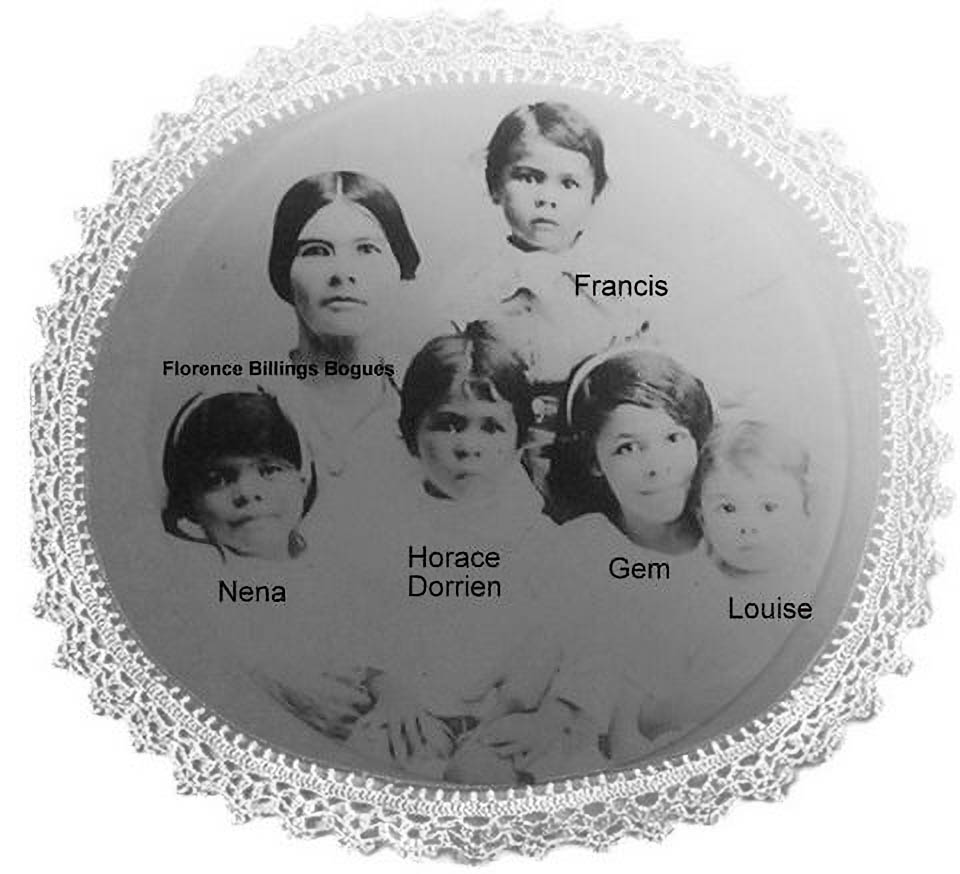
Florence Bogues and children; Harlem, New York City circa 1920

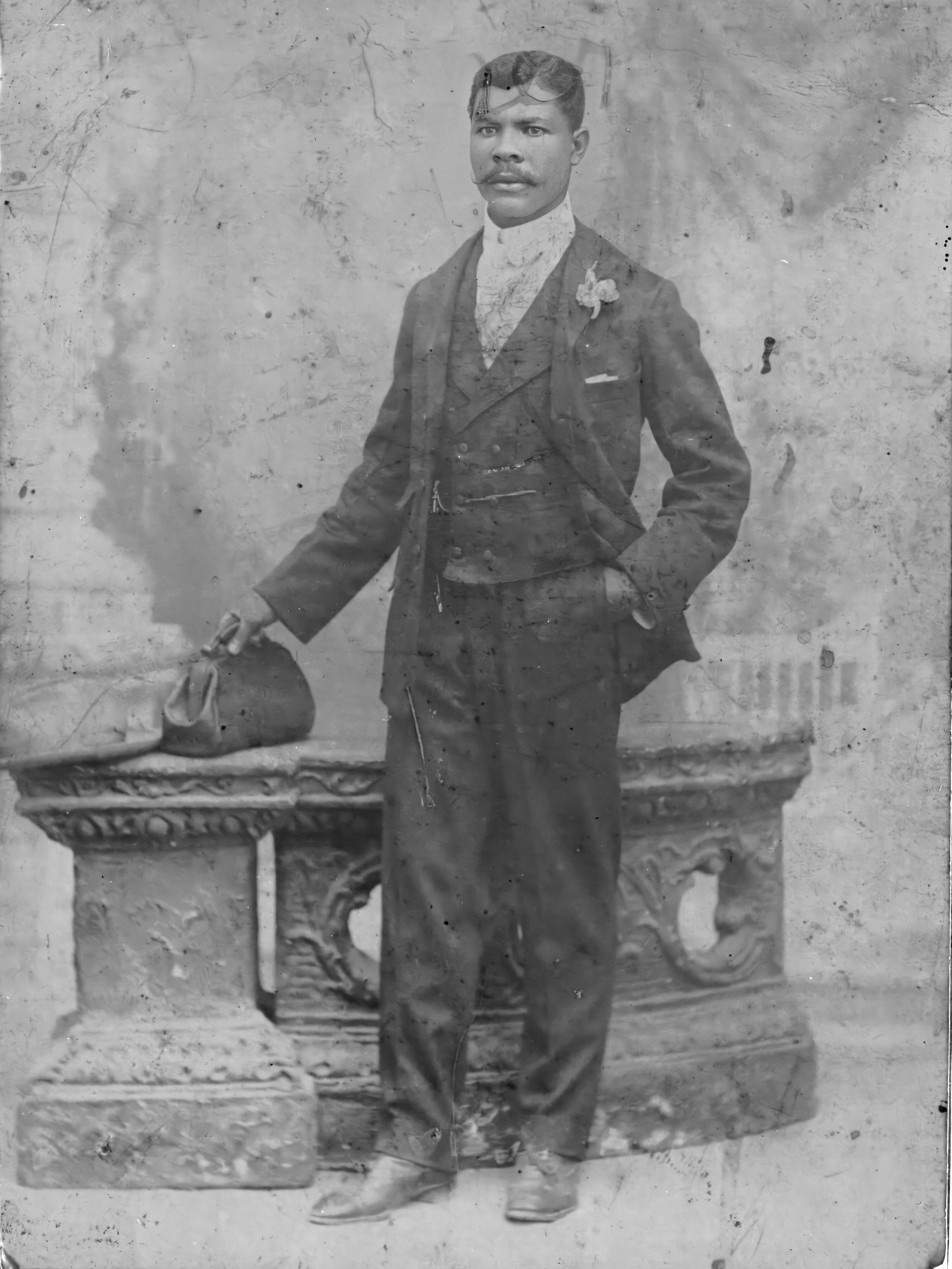
Sydney Uriah Bogues' graduation photo Howard University c. 1923.

Sydney Uriah and his brother, Frank (Milholland) travelled to Washington D.C. to pursue a formal degree. His Ellis Island records show him to be attending school at Howard University in the early 1920s. Also migrating from Jamaica; his son, H.E.Dorrien Bogues in his biography says that he lived and studied in his own youth at New York, U.S.A. from 1919-23.

== Early Childhood ==
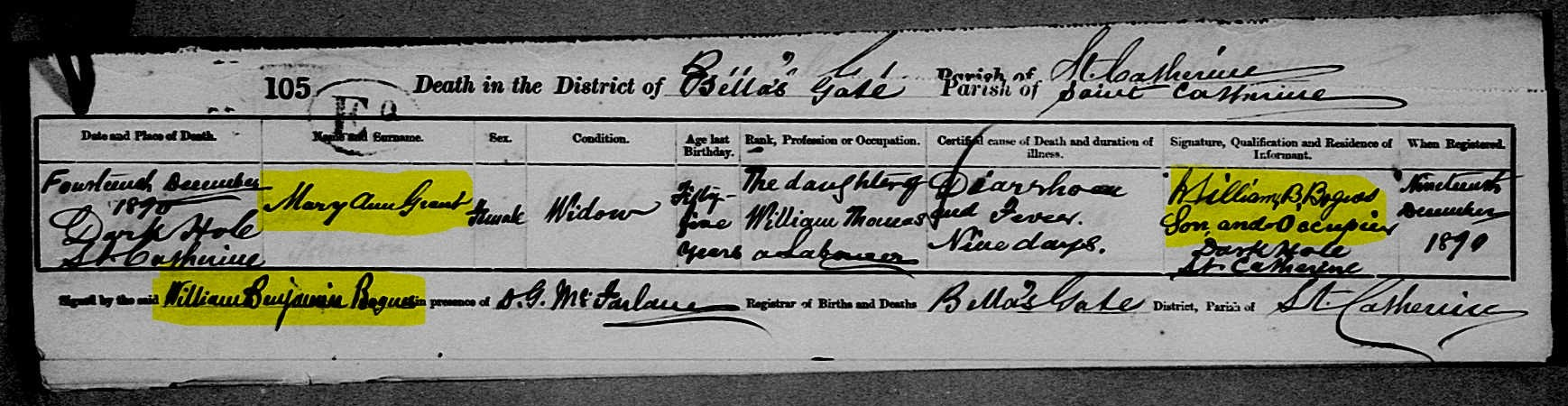
Sydney Bogues' Grandmother's death certificate, c. 1890

Sydney Uriah Bogues was about 6 years old in Dark Hole, Bella's Gate when his Grandmother Mary Ann died from an intestinal problem likely from bacteria. It was the year 1890 and about 10 months earlier his 2-year-old younger brother, Algernon died from whooping cough. Many small children and newborns had also died from whooping cough in the Bella's Gate community in that same time period.

This is why S.U. Bogues in his youth decided to pursue a career in the field of preparing medicine.

== The 1907 Earthquake and New Market ==
After the earthquake of 1907 S.U. Bogues travelled to New Market, St. Elizabeth, where he found his new bride. He was the Secretary of a Relief Fund seeking donations from several organizations after the devastating effects of the earthquake in Jamaica.

He married the daughter of Robert Leslie Billings, Miss Florence Matilda Billings in 1910; she was born and raised in St. Elizabeth. Later in life, she was also the organist at the East Queen Street Baptist Church downtown Kingston.

== Ellis Island and Harlem, New York City ==
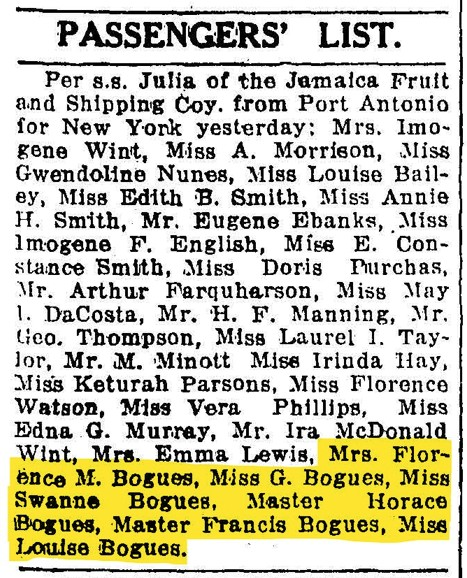
Mrs. Florence Bogues and family; Jamaica Gleaner 1920 July 23, Page 11

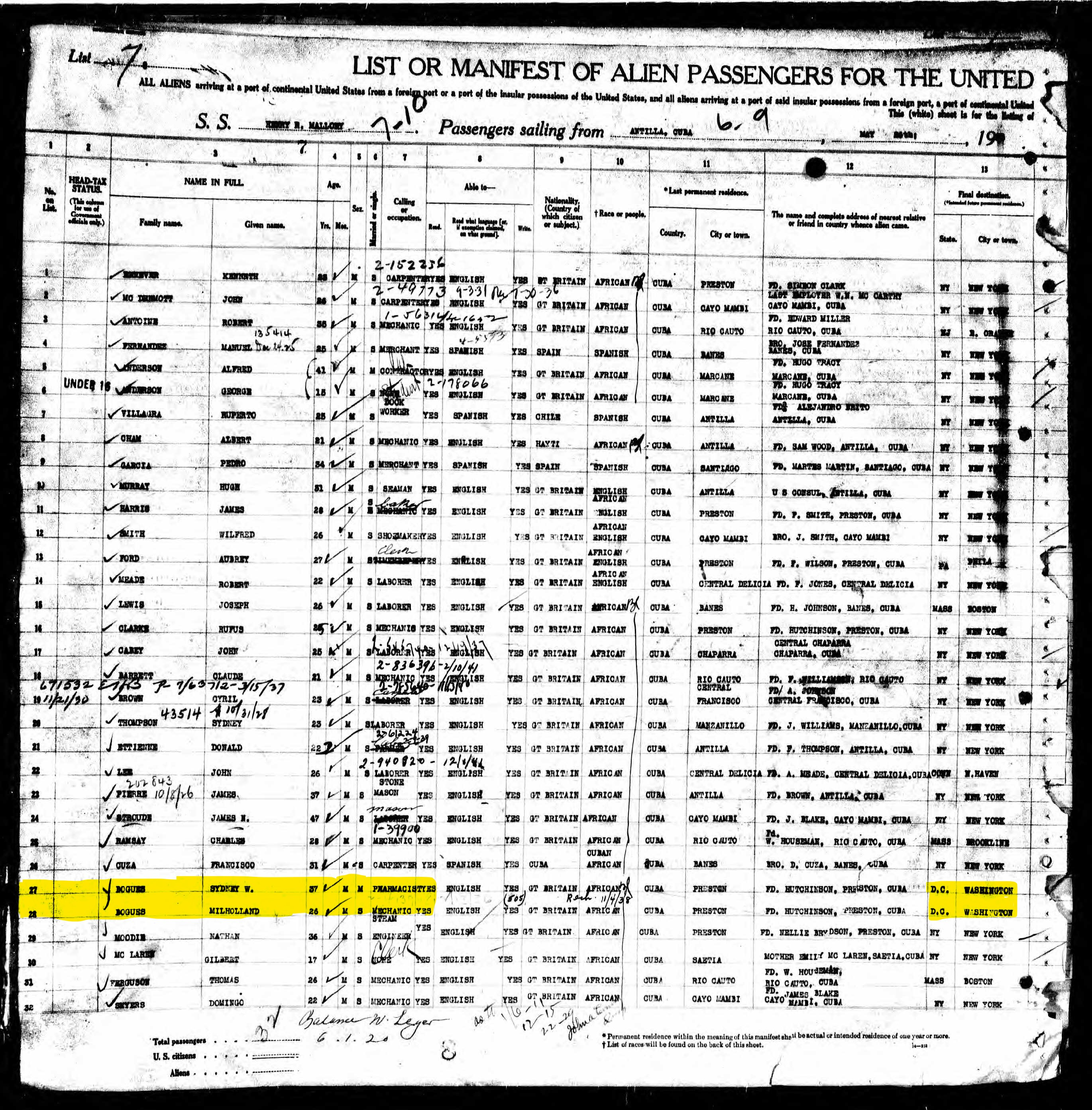
Sydney and Milholland Bogues travelling to Ellis Island, New York, c. 1920.

In 1919 Sydney Uriah and Florence Bogues along with their five children migrated to New York on separate voyages. They resided in the burrows of Harlem according to addresses provided to the port officials at Ellis Island

After graduating from Howard University, he returned South and practiced as a pharmacist in Cuba and Belize.

== Legacy ==
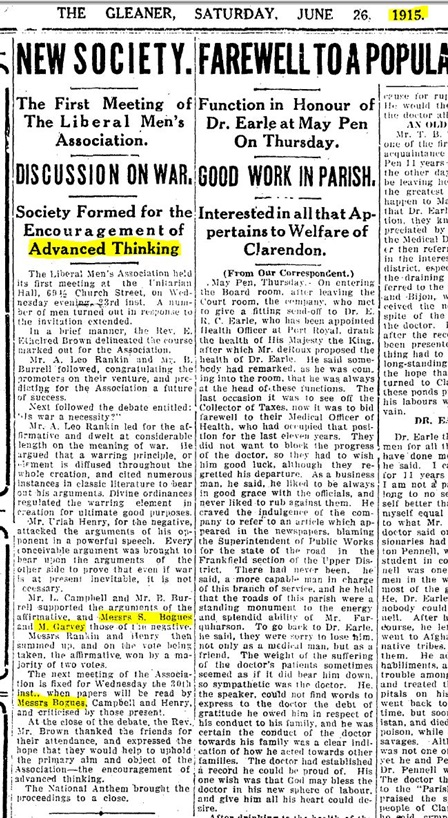
Jamaica Gleaner Article in 1915 with Messrs. S. Bogues and M. Garvey.

According to family accounts, Bogues was a contemporary of Rt. Hon. Marcus Garvey and of him being a part of the Harlem Renaissance. He is reported to have lived in New York during this period, and a 1915 Gleaner article has been cited as evidence of a connection with Garvey.

His nephew, Sen. Leon Bogues stayed in New York and later became a State Senator representing Harlem.

His eldest son H.E.Dorrien along with his younger brothers, Francis and David founded the Jamaican conglomerate, Bogues Brothers Ltd. in 1939 when they imported Jamaica's first modern dry-cleaning plant for the Hamilton Suit Company.

Sydney Bogues' son-in-law, David Leopold Baugh was instrumental in assisting his own cousin, Thomas Phillip Lecky, Ph.D., O.B.E., O.M., Agricultural Geneticist in his research by way of facilitating his experiments on his farm resulting in famous cattle breeds, such as the Jamaican Red Poll.

His brother Egbert Bogues' grandson is Caribbean political theorist, intellectual historian, writer and curator, Dr. B. Anthony Bogues, PhD.
