= Henry B. Bogue =

American football and basketball coach (1892–1985)

Biographical details
- Born: December 16, 1892; Salem, Iowa
- Died: February 1, 1985 (aged 92)

Playing career

Football
- 1914–1917: Penn (IA)

Coaching career (HC unless noted)

Football
- 1920: Wilmington (OH)
- 1922–1924: Geneseo Township HS (IL)
- 1925–1926: Granite City HS (IL)
- 1927–1950: Indianapolis Washington HS (IL)

Basketball
- 1920–1921: Wilmington (OH)

Head coaching record
- Overall: 0–6 (college football); 7–9 (college basketball); 105–89–19 (high school football)

Henry B. Bogue (December 16, 1892 – February 1, 1985) was an American college football and basketball coach. He served as the head basketball coach at Wilmington College, Ohio from 1920 to 1921.
