= Eric Bogue =

American politician

Member of the South Dakota Senate from the 28th district
- In office January 12, 1999 – January 9, 2007
- Preceded by: William J. Johnson
- Succeeded by: Ryan Maher

Member of the South Dakota House of Representatives from the 28A district
- In office January 10, 1995 – January 14, 1997
- Preceded by: Dean Schrempp
- Succeeded by: Dean Schrempp

Personal details
- Born: October 4, 1964 (age 61) Huron, South Dakota
- Party: Republican

Eric Bogue (born October 4, 1964) is an American politician who served in the South Dakota House of Representatives from the 28A district from 1995 to 1997 and in the South Dakota Senate from the 28th district from 1999 to 2007.
