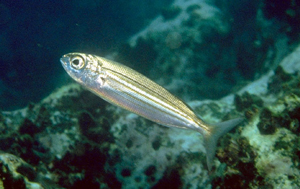
- Boops boops

Scientific classification
- Kingdom: Animalia
- Phylum: Chordata
- Class: Actinopterygii
- Order: Acanthuriformes
- Family: Sparidae
- Genus: Boops; Cuvier, 1814

Type species
- Sparus boops Linnaeus, 1758

Species
- see text

Synonyms
- Box Valenciennes in Cuvier & Valenciennes, 1830; Exocallus de la Pylaie, 1835

= Boops =

Boops Temporal range: Middle Miocene–present

Genus of ray-finned fishes

Boops /ˈboʊ.ɒps/ is a genus of marine ray-finned fishes belonging to the family Sparidae, the seabreams and porgies. There are two species in this genus, one in the Eastern Atlantic and Mediterranean, and the other in the Western Indian Ocean.

== Taxonomy ==
Boops was first proposed as a genus in 1814 by the French zoologist Georges Cuvier with Sparus boops being its type species by "absolute tautonymy". This taxon is placed in the family Sparidae within the order Spariformes by the 5th edition of Fishes of the World. Some authorities classify this genus in the subfamily Boopsinae, but the 5th edition of Fishes of the World does not recognise subfamilies within the Sparidae.

== Etymology ==
Boops derives from the Ancient Greek βό (bo) meaning 'ox' and ὤψ (ops) meaning 'eye', referring to its large eyes.

== Species ==
Boops contains 2 species:

- Boops boops (Linnaeus, 1758) (Bogue)
- Boops lineatus (Boulenger, 1892) (Striped boga)

The fossil species †Boops roulei Arambourg, 1927 (=†Boops gortanii D'Erasmo, 1930) is known from the Late Miocene of Italy and Algeria. This species was likely driven to extinction by ecological shifts from the Messinian salinity crisis. In addition, an indeterminate fossil Boops potentially allied with B. roulei is known from Middle Miocene-aged Paratethyan sediments from Austria.

== Characteristics ==
Boops is characterised by having a torpedo-shaped, elongated body with large eyes, the diameter of the eyes being longer than the snout. The pectoral fins are short, being three-quarters the length of the head and the caudal fin has a deep fork. There is a single row of teeth in the jaws, these are incisor-like. There are dark stripes along the otherwise silvery body. The largest of the 2 species is the bogue, which has a maximum published total length of 40 cm (16 in) while the striped boga has a maximum published total length of 25 cm (9.8 in).

== Distribution and habitat ==
Boops species are parapatric. The bogue is found in the eastern Atlantic Ocean from Norway south to Angola and in the Mediterranean and Black Seas. The silvery boga is found in the western Indian Ocean along the southern coast of the Arabian Peninsula from central Yemen to the Gulf of Oman. They are gregarious fishes that form schools in shallow coastal waters.

== Fisheries ==
Boops are fished for, although the smaller silvery boga is probably only taken by subsistence fishers. The bogue is pursued commercially and used as a food fish, bait in tuna fisheries and to make fish meal.
