= Leon Bogues =

American politician (1927–1985)

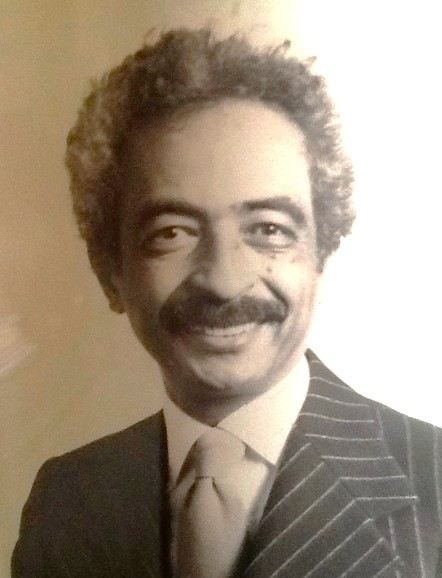
- Bogues, c. 1980

Member of the New York State Senate
- In office February 12, 1980 – August 6, 1985
- Preceded by: H. Carl McCall
- Succeeded by: David Paterson
- Constituency: 28th district (1980-1982); 29th district (1983-1985)

Personal details
- Born: New York City, US
- Died: August 6, 1985 (aged 57) New York City, US
- Spouse: Dorothy Bogues
- Children: 2
- Occupation: Politician

Leon Franklin Bogues (/ˈboʊɡzj/ BOHG-s; died August 6, 1985) was an American politician from New York.

== Life ==
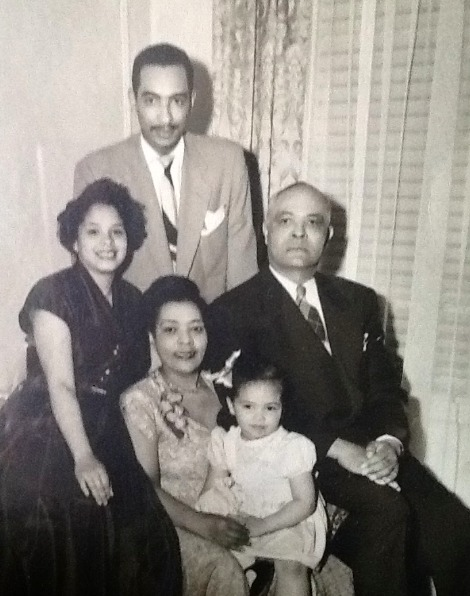
Leon Bogues (standing) with his father, mother, wife and young daughter circa 1953.

Leon Bogues was born in Harlem, the son of Jamaican migrants Frank Millholand Bogues and Rosa Louise Bogues née McLaren. He attended Howard University, and graduated from Long Island University. Then he became a probation officer attached to the New York Supreme Court (1st D.). He married Dorothy, and they had two children. He is also the nephew of Sydney Bogues.

He entered politics as a Democrat, and was appointed by Borough President Percy Sutton to the Manhattan Community Board No. 7. In 1978, he became the board's chairman.

On February 12, 1980, he was elected to the New York State Senate, to fill the vacancy caused by the appointment of Carl McCall to the U.S. Mission to the U.N. Bogues was re-elected three times, and remained in the State Senate until his death in 1985, sitting in the 183rd, 184th, 185th and 186th New York State Legislatures. His district comprised parts of Harlem and the Upper West Side.

He died on August 6, 1985, at his home on West 95th Street in Manhattan, of lung cancer.

New York State Senate
Preceded by Carl McCall	New York State Senate; 28th District; 1980–1982	Succeeded by Franz S. Leichter
Preceded by Franz S. Leichter	New York State Senate; 29th District; 1983–1985	Succeeded by David Paterson
