= Tom Van Norman =

American politician

Member of the South Dakota House of Representatives from the 28A district
- In office 2000–2008

Personal details
- Born: March 20, 1964 (age 62) Elmhurst, Illinois
- Party: Democratic
- Spouse: Divorced
- Education: State University of New York, University of Colorado School of Law
- Profession: Attorney

Thomas James Van Norman was a Democratic member of the South Dakota House of Representatives, representing the 28A district from 2000 to 2008.
