= 2005 Buffalo mayoral election =

- November 8, 2005
- Turnout: 24.97%
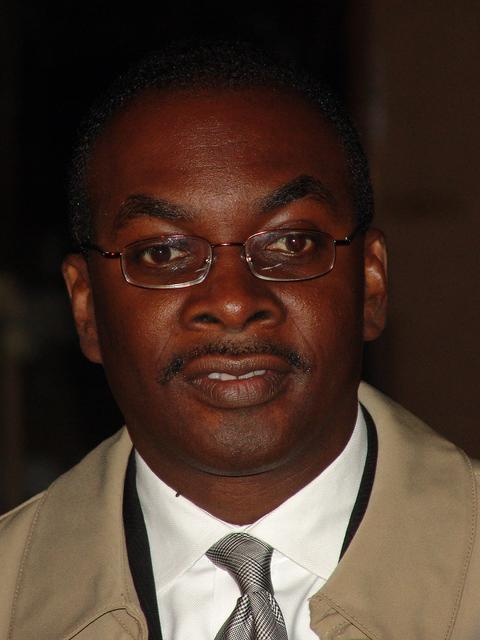

| Nominee | Byron Brown | Kevin J. Helfer |
| Party | Democratic | Republican |
| Alliance | Working Families | Conservative |
| Popular vote | 46,613 | 19,853 |
| Percentage | 63.79% | 27.17% |
- Results by city council district Brown: 40–50% 50–60% 60–70% 70–80% 80–90%
Mayor before election
Anthony Masiello
Elected mayor
Byron Brown

The 2005 Buffalo Mayoral Election took place on November 8, 2005. After incumbent Anthony M. Masiello, a Democrat, announced on April 29, 2005, that he would not seek a fourth term as mayor, a field of several Democratic candidates emerged, from which New York State Senator Byron Brown emerged victorious in the primary election. In the general election, Brown went on to defeat Republican challenger Kevin Helfer, former member of the Buffalo Common Council for the University District, as well as two minor-party candidates. Buffalo's 2005 mayoral election is notable as the first in the city to be won by an African-American candidate.

== Nominations ==
=== Democratic primary ===
==== Candidates ====
In addition to Brown, candidates for the Democratic nomination for Mayor in 2005 included Brown's predecessor as State Senator for the 57th District, Al Coppola, attorney and government reform advocate Kevin Gaughan, restaurateur Steven Calvaneso, neighborhood activist and perennial candidate Judith Einach, and Erie County Democratic Committee member Darnell Jackson. Coppola dropped out of the race early, while the latter two hopefuls were removed from the ballot in August 2005 by the Erie County Board of Elections due to petition irregularities, leading to a three-way contest between Brown, Gaughan and Calvaneso for the Democratic nomination.

==== Results ====
The Democratic primary election was held on September 13, 2005. Brown placed first in the polls with 16,900 votes cast, or 60.6% of the total, winning the Democratic nomination. In second place was Gaughan with 9,264 votes (34.5%), and Calvaneso placed third with 1,362 votes (4.9%).

Democratic primary results
| Party | Candidate | Votes | % |
|---|---|---|---|
| Democratic | Byron W. Brown | 16,900 | 60.60% |
| Democratic | Kevin P. Gaughan | 9,624 | 34.51% |
| Democratic | Steven A. Calvaneso | 1,362 | 4.88% |
| Total votes | | 27,886 | 100% |

=== Conservative primary ===
==== Candidates ====
Despite the fact that Brown was cross-endorsed by the Erie County Conservative Party under the terms of New York State's electoral fusion law, Republican candidate Kevin Helfer mounted an unprecedented write-in campaign in the Conservative primary election on September 13, 2005, that was described as "crucial" for his hopes to win the general election.

==== Results ====
The Conservative primary was held on September 13, 2005. Helfer won the election handily, earning 190 votes (65.1%) to Brown's 95 (32.5%). Gaughan also earned 7 write-in votes (2.4%).

Conservative primary results
| Party | Candidate | Votes | % |
|---|---|---|---|
| Conservative | Kevin J. Helfer (write-in) | 190 | 65.07% |
| Conservative | Byron W. Brown | 95 | 32.53% |
| Conservative | Kevin P. Gaughan (write-in) | 7 | 2.40% |
| Total votes | | 292 | 100% |

=== Independence Party primary ===
==== Candidates ====
Despite the fact that the Erie County Independence Party officially endorsed Brown for mayor, there were two candidates from that party who also sought the nomination: Louis P. Corrigan, the Secretary of the Erie County Independence Party, and former local party chairman Charles J. Flynn. Corrigan was ruled ineligible for the ballot by the Erie County Board of Elections due to petition challenges, while Flynn's petitions withstood a similar legal challenge.

==== Results ====
The Independence Party primary was held on September 13. Flynn placed first with 135 votes (45.2%); Brown took second place with 128 (42.8%). Also, Helfer earned 32 write-in votes (10.7%), and Gaughan won four (1.3%).

Independence primary results
| Party | Candidate | Votes | % |
|---|---|---|---|
| Independence | Charles J. Flynn | 135 | 45.15% |
| Independence | Byron W. Brown | 128 | 42.81% |
| Independence | Kevin J. Helfer (write-in) | 32 | 10.70% |
| Independence | Kevin P. Gaughan (write-in) | 4 | 1.34% |
| Total votes | | 299 | 100% |

=== Other candidates ===
Helfer was unopposed for the Republican nomination.

Despite the petition irregularities which kept her off the ballot in the Democratic primary, Judith Einach was able to secure the nomination of the Green Party and contest the general election.

== General election ==
=== Endorsements ===
In addition to the Erie County Democratic Committee, Brown received the endorsement of the Erie County Working Families Party. Brown was also endorsed by both of New York's United States Senators, Charles Schumer and Hillary Clinton, as well as New York State Attorney General Eliot Spitzer, and New York State Assemblyman and future Congressman Brian Higgins. Helfer was endorsed by the Erie County Republican Party as well as the Buffalo Niagara Partnership, the Buffalo News, and local businessman and future gubernatorial candidate Carl Paladino.

=== Polling ===
| Poll source | Date(s) administered | Sample size (Note: Key: A – all adults RV – registered voters LV – likely voters V – unclear) | Margin of error | Byron Brown (D) | Kevin Helfer (R) | Other | Undecided |
|---|---|---|---|---|---|---|---|
| SurveyUSA | November 4–6, 2005 | 573 (LV) | ± 4.1% | 61% | 30% | 7% | 2% |
| SurveyUSA | October 21–23, 2005 | 564 (LV) | ± 4.1% | 59% | 28% | 10% | 3% |
| SurveyUSA | September 27–29, 2005 | 547 (LV) | ± 4.3% | 55% | 33% | 8% | 4% |

=== Results ===
The general election was held on November 8, 2005. Brown placed first with 46,613 votes cast, or 63.8% of the total. Helfer placed second with 19,853 votes (27.2%). In third place was Einach, with 3,525 votes (4.8%), and in fourth was Flynn with 3,082 votes (4.2%).

General election results
| Party | Candidate | Votes | % |
|---|---|---|---|
| Democratic | Byron W. Brown | 43,541 | 59.59% |
| Working Families | Byron W. Brown | 3,072 | 4.20% |
| Total | Byron W. Brown | 46,613 | 63.79% |
| Republican | Kevin J Helfer | 17,680 | 24.19% |
| Conservative | Kevin J Helfer | 2,173 | 2.97% |
| Total | Kevin J Helfer | 19,853 | 27.17% |
| Green | Judith S. Einach | 3,525 | 4.82% |
| Independence | Charles J. Flynn | 3,082 | 4.22% |
| Total votes | | 73,073 | 100% |
