= David Franczyk =

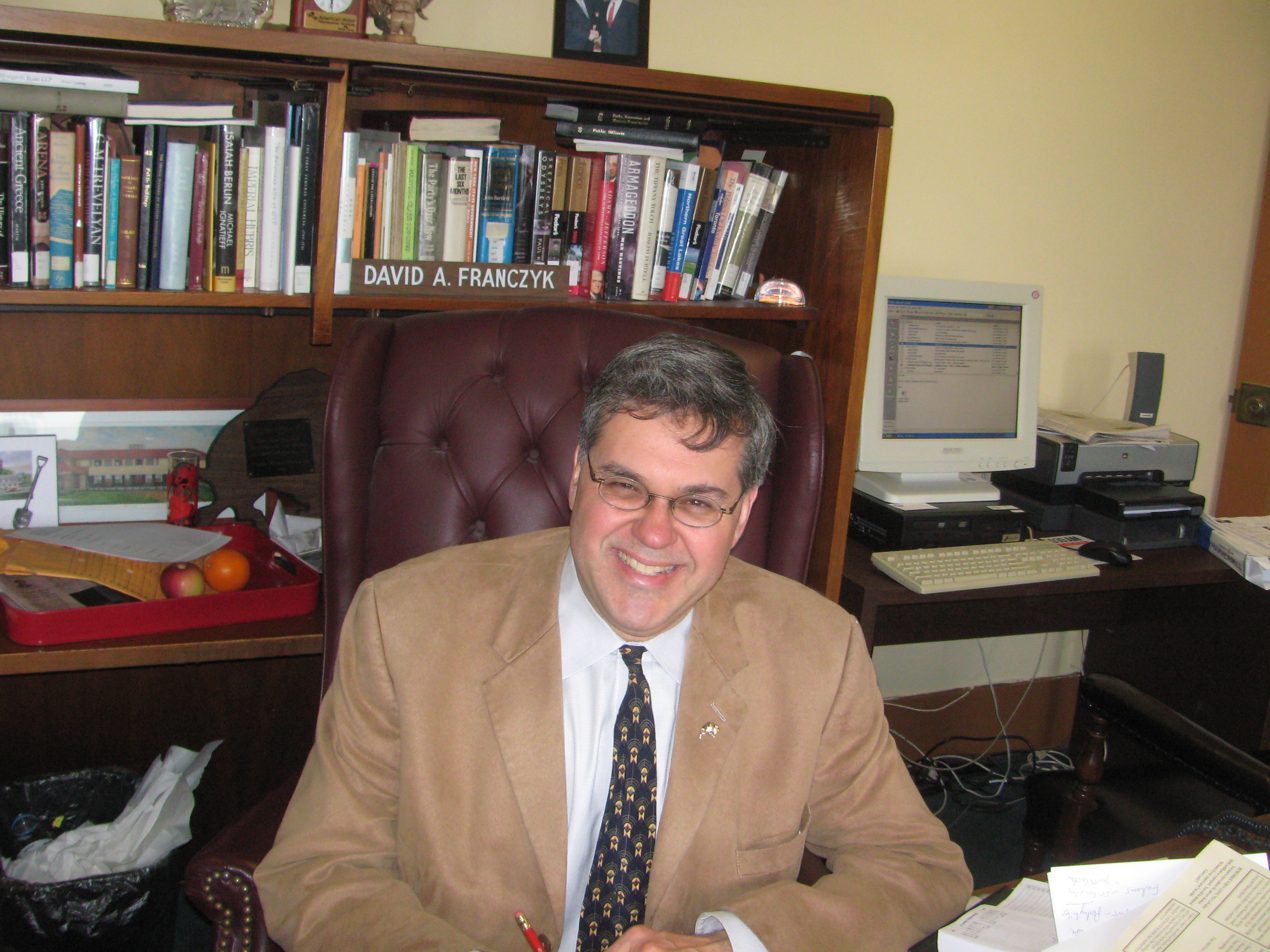
- Franczyk at his Buffalo City Hall office

Member of the Buffalo Common Council from the Fillmore district
- In office 1986–2020
- Preceded by: Stephen J. Godzisz
- Succeeded by: Mitchell P. Nowakowski

Personal details
- Party: Democratic
- Education: Buffalo State College; Niagara University
- Website: www.city-buffalo.com

David A. "Dave" Franczyk is a councilmember of the Buffalo Common Council, which is the representative legislative branch of the government of Buffalo, New York. He is also a former Liberal Party and Democratic Party nominee for the United States House of Representatives.

== History ==
In 1994, Franczyk was both the Liberal Party and the Democratic Party nominee in a closely watched United States House of Representatives race for New York's 30th congressional district. He lost by a two to one margin to then one-term incumbent Republican Jack Quinn. Prior to this race, as a city councilman, he was an adversary of Mayor of Buffalo James D. Griffin. Franczyk is considered a notable Western New York Polish-American politician.

== Common Council ==
In his present tenure in the Common Council, Franczyk is a member of the Finance and Civil Service Committees. Prior to his current term, Franczyk served as Fillmore District Councilmember, Chair of the City's Finance Committee, and President Pro-Tempore of the Common Council from 1986 through 2000. He has legislated on crime prevention, historic preservation, housing, economic development, and constituent service. He is an advocate of landmark preservation, and has also been involved in environmental preservation battles. He proposed the legislation that reduced the Buffalo Common Council from thirteen members to nine. Franczyk was preceded as Fillmore District Councilman by Stephen J. Godzisz, who had served from 1984-1985 and as Common Council President by James Pitts who began his term in 1994 under Buffalo Mayor Anthony Masiello. Franczyk continued under Masiello until Masiello was succeeded by Byron Brown.

Franczyk, after 32 years of service announced in January 2019 he would not seek re-election. His successor, Legislative Staffer, Mitch Nowakowski won the June 25th democratic primary and November 5th general election to succeed him as Fillmore District Council Member.

== Personal ==
Franczyk, a Western New York native, earned a Bachelor of Arts degree in history from the State University of New York College at Buffalo and a Master of Arts degree, also in history, from Niagara University. He also did graduate study at the City University of New York and at Harvard University's Graduate School of Design as a Loeb Fellow. He has served as the editor-in-chief of the Polish-American Journal.
