= Antoine Thompson =

African-American New York State Democratic politician

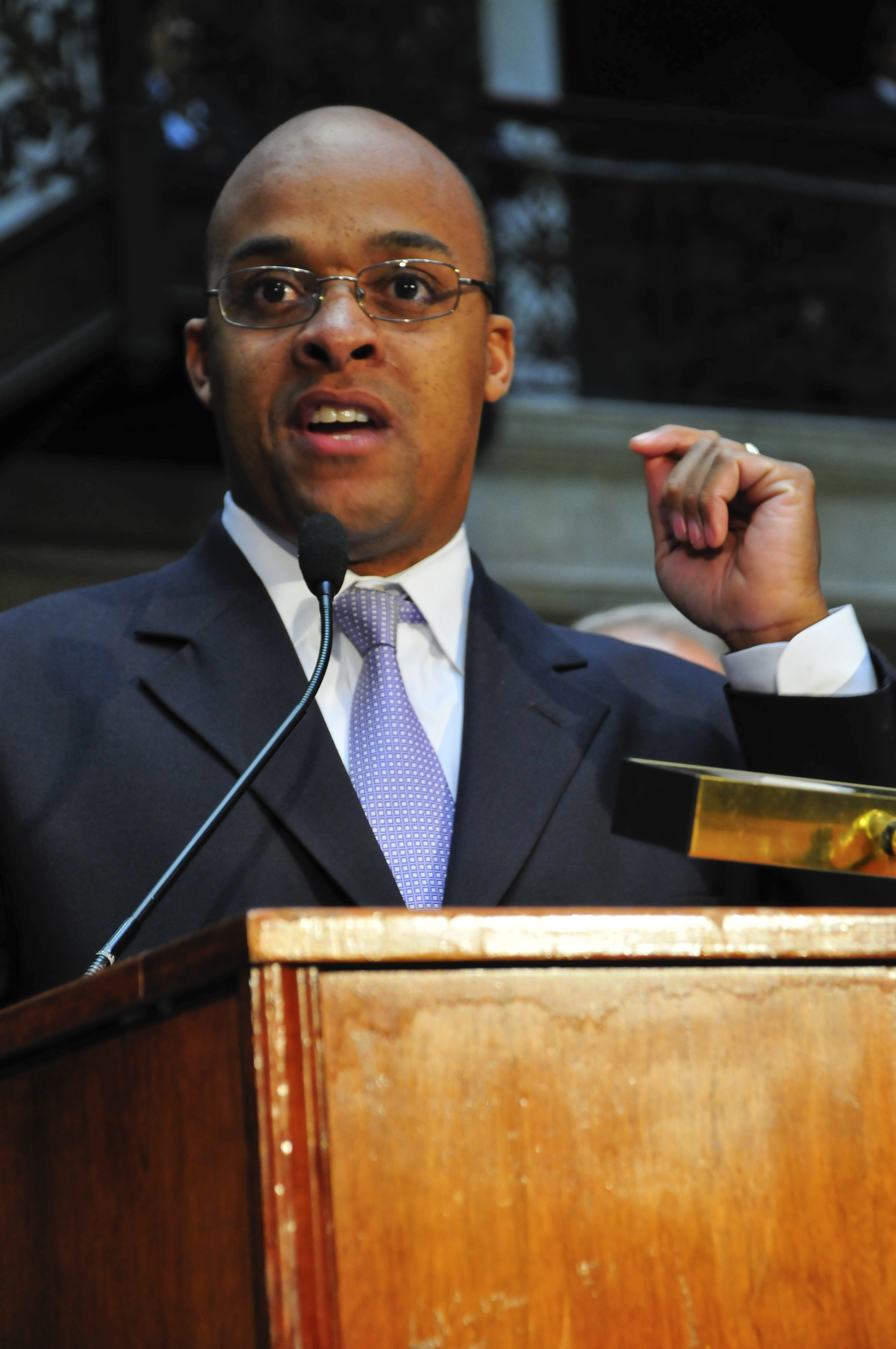
- Thompson speaks at a Barack Obama rally at the Erie County Democratic Headquarters (October 29, 2008)

Member of the New York State Senate from the 60th district
- In office January 3, 2007 – January 2, 2011
- Preceded by: Marc Coppola
- Succeeded by: Mark Grisanti

Member of the Buffalo Common Council from the Masten District
- In office January 4, 2001 – January 3, 2007
- Preceded by: Byron Brown
- Succeeded by: Demone Smith

Personal details
- Born: March 1, 1970 (age 56) Buffalo, New York, U.S.
- Party: Democratic
- Children: 2
- Education: State University of New York at Brockport

Antoine Maurice Thompson (born March 1, 1970) is an American politician from Buffalo, New York. A Democrat, Thompson represented the 60th District in the New York State Senate from 2007 to 2011. Thompson previously served as the Masten District councilman on the Buffalo Common Council from 2001 to 2007.

== Early life and education ==
Born in Buffalo, New York, Thompson is a 1994 graduate of State University of New York at Brockport where he received a Bachelor of Science in history. He is the son of Richard Allen Thompson and Wanda Strong Thompson, and was raised in Buffalo and was a graduate of public schools #60, #61 and Bennett High School. In high school, he was captain of both the cross-country and track & field teams and earned All-Western New York Honors in both.

== Political career ==
Starting in 1996, he served two years as a legislative assistant to the Buffalo Common Council. In early 1998, he was named executive director of the Office of Urban Initiatives, which is a community development corporation that endeavors to improve business opportunities for minorities. After then-Common Councilman Byron Brown was elected to the New York State Senate in November 2000, Thompson was favored for an appointment as Brown's successor.

=== Buffalo Common Councilmember ===
Thompson was sworn in as the Masten District Common Councilman on January 4, 2001 after being appointed by the Democratic Committee. His East Side district included 27% of Buffalo's African American population. The Buffalo Common Council had a brief African-American majority during Thompson's appointed half term that ended following the subsequent elections in September and November 2001. After African-Americans lost their majority the council voted along racial lines by a 7–6 margin to shrink the common council from thirteen to nine members by eliminating the four at-large positions (three of which were held by African-Americans). The city voters endorsed the proposal by a 35,849–19,036 margin which largely went along racial lines. Thompson retained his council position in the 2001, 2003 and 2005 elections. Thompson was a John Edwards delegate at the 2004 Democratic National Convention.

As a councilmember, Thompson advocated against crime and economic malaise and for foster economic development, worker training, and public parks. He also co-sponsored a resolution with David Franczyk against continued military involvement in the Iraq War.

==== Potential bids for higher office ====
In 2005, Thompson began testing the waters for higher office. He raised campaign funds and consulted party leaders about the possibility of challenging United States House of Representatives then 76-year-old congresswoman Louise Slaughter who was already a 10-term veteran. Slaughter's New York's 28th congressional district was 29 percent African American, and minorities comprised nearly 40 percent of the Democratic primary vote. Charles B. Rangel warned that Slaughter had strong ties to the Congressional Black Caucus as well as strong support from labor, women's and pro-choice groups.

Thompson was encouraged to pursue Brown's New York State Senate seat that was to be filled by special election on February 28, 2006 after Brown ascended to be the Mayor of Buffalo on January 1, 2006 following the 2005 election. The district has a 4–1 ratio of registered Democrats to Republicans. In 2006, the Erie County Democratic Committee chairman was Leonard Lenihan, and he noted that Thompson had not been timely in entering the special election process. The Erie and Niagara County Democratic committees bypassed Thompson as their nominee in favor of Marc Coppola despite Brown's backing. Thompson had issued a threat that without backing for the State Senate seat, he would challenge Slaughter in the September primary election, but Lenihan was unimpressed with the threat and asserted that Thompson needed to take a "Dale Carnegie course in terms of how to win friends and influence people".

Thompson decided to run for the New York Senate seat in the November 2006 general election. Marc Coppola won the special election by a 56–44% margin in a district where Democrats outnumber Republicans more than 6:1. Thompson opposed incumbent Senator Marc Coppola as well as his cousin Former State Sen. Al Coppola in the September 2006 Democratic Primary for a full two-year term in the Senate. Thompson defeated both with 53% of the vote. He then defeated Marc Coppola again in the General election where Coppola ran as an Independent.

=== New York State Senator ===
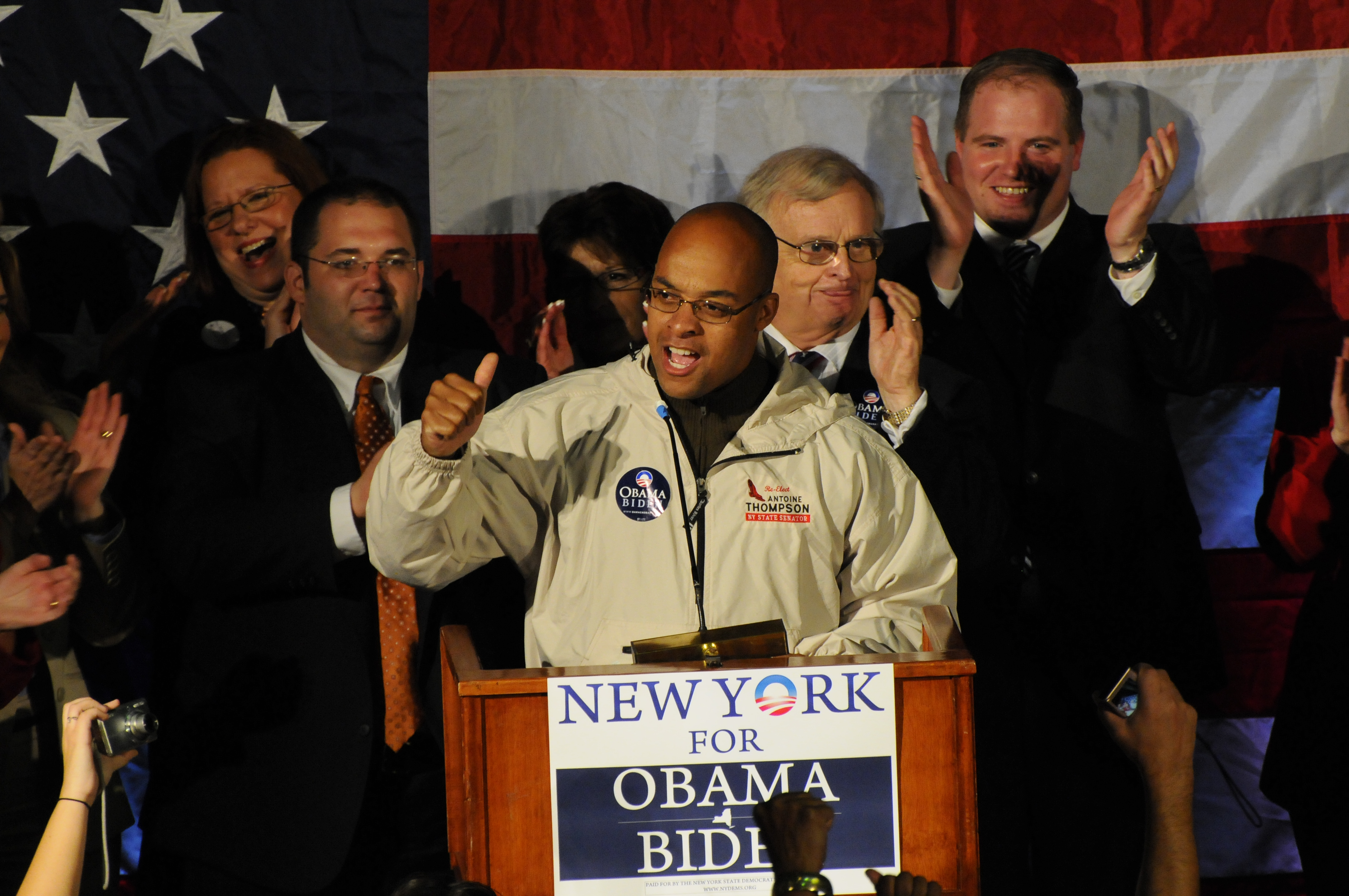
Thompson speaks on the night of the 2008 United States presidential election at the Erie County Democratic Headquarters.

When Thompson became a State Senator in January 2007, he—along with Diane Savino and Jeffrey Klein (both of whom later defected from the Senate Democratic Conference to form the core of the Independent Democratic Conference)--assumed the chairmanship of the New York Democratic Senate Campaign Committee. He retained this position through the 2008 general election.

Thompson was the Chairman of the Senate Environmental Conservation Committee. He was the former Ranking Minority Member of the Senate Cities Committee, which oversaw all legislation impacting the state's 62 incorporated cities and urban policy. This position was held by his two immediate predecessors in the Senate, Byron Brown and Marc Coppola. Thompson served on the Finance; Commerce, Economic Development and Small Business; Tourism, Recreation and Sports Development and Veterans, Homeland Security and Military Affairs committees.

When Thompson assumed office, he worked on economic revitalization issues and the redevelopment of brownfield land, but he had to combat government inaction and bureaucracy in this effort. In 2010, Thompson arranged for a $400,000 grant from the State's Economic Development Program for Manhattan billionaire Howard Milstein's Niagara Falls Redevelopment company to demolish properties in Niagara Falls, New York. Thompson was a vocal spokesman against the May 2007 bill to raise State Senator salaries because the lack of raises for Buffalo city workers made it seem wrong to him. After refusing to comment on the issue for some time, Thompson was one of eight Democratic defectors on Eliot Spitzer's unpopular policy allowing illegal aliens to obtain driver's licenses. Thompson was one of eleven New York State Senators to be uncontested in the November 2008 general election. He supported the streamlining of minority- and woman-owned business certification and opposed fracking Thompson voted in favor of same-sex marriage legislation on December 2, 2009, but the bill was defeated.

Thompson won the Democratic Party nomination in a three-way contest in the September 14, 2010 primary election. After a lengthy recount Thompson lost the general election to Mark Grisanti, an enrolled Democrat who ran on the Republican Party line. Days before the election, Thompson was named in a pay to play scandal where he received $8600 from Aqueduct Entertainment Group (AEG), who was attempting to secure a lucrative state contract to operate a video slot machine casino at Aqueduct Racetrack in Queens, New York.

== Post-legislative career ==
Thompson formerly hosted Western New York on the Move, a weekly radio show broadcast Thursdays at noon on WUFO 1080 AM.

Thompson moved to Prince George's County, Maryland, in 2015. From 2015 to 2021, he was the Executive Director of the National Association of Real Estate Brokers (NAREB), the largest organization of African-American real estate professionals in the United States. As of 2026, Thompson is the CEO and executive director of the Greater Washington Region Clean Cities Coalition.

In November 2023, after the Prince George's County Democratic Central Committee voted to appoint Maryland state delegate Nick Charles to the Maryland Senate, Thompson told the Washington Informer that he would apply to serve the remainder of Charles' term in the Maryland House of Delegates. In December 2023, the Prince George's County Democratic Central Committee voted to nominate Denise Roberts to fill the vacancy, with Thompson receiving four votes. Thompson later filed to run for the seat in the 2026 election, but lost the Democratic primary to incumbents Roberts, Karen Toles, and Kent Roberson.

== Personal life ==
Thompson is married to Tracey Thompson and the father of Deja LaShay and Joseph Antoine Alexander Thompson. As of 2026, he and his wife are partners at Creative PMO Solutions, a consulting firm focused on diversity, workforce development, project management and public affairs. Thompson is a member of Alpha Phi Alpha.

In 2013, 2014, 2015, and 2018, the Internal Revenue Service filed $56,289 in tax liens against Thompson. He told The Buffalo News in September 2014 that he had worked out a three-year payment plan to pay off the lien he owed to the IRS, and that most of his financial problems traced back to when his income dropped after he left the New York State Senate and turned to his business and entrepreneurial work. When asked about his tax liens in April 2026, a spokesperson for Thompson said that his debts were fully resolved.

== See also ==
- 2009 New York State Senate leadership crisis

Political offices
Preceded by Byron Brown	Buffalo, New York Masten District Councilman; 2001–2006	Succeeded by Demone Smith
Preceded by Carl Marcellino	Chairperson of the Senate Committee on Environmental Conservation; 2009–2010	Succeeded by Mark Grisanti
New York State Senate
Preceded by Marc Coppola	New York State Senate, 60th District; 2007–2010	Succeeded by Mark Grisanti
