= Senator Coppola =

Senator Coppola may refer to:

- Alfred Coppola (born 1942), New York State Senate
- Marc A. Coppola (born 1968), New York State Senate
