= Marc Coppola =

Marc Coppola may refer to:

- Marc A. Coppola (born 1967/68), former member of the New York State Senate
- Marc Coppola (actor) (born 1958), American actor and DJ
