= 2017 Buffalo mayoral election =

- November 7, 2017
- Turnout: 15.95%
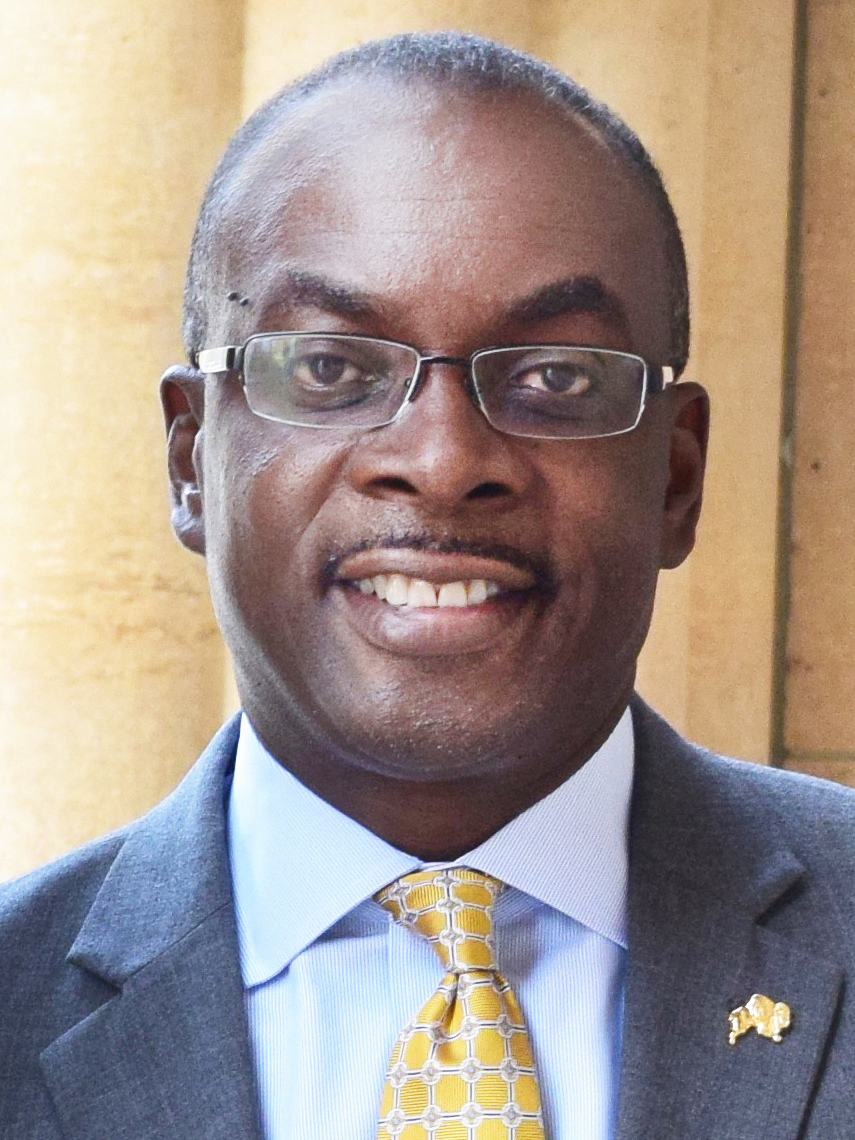

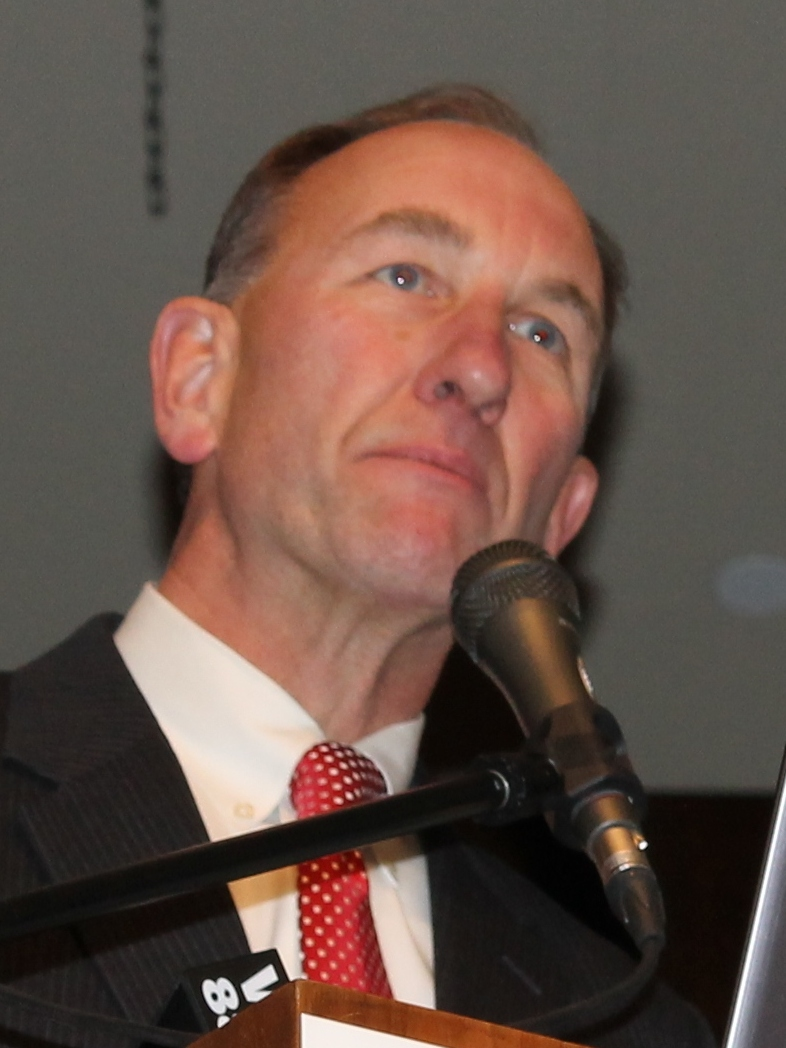
Nominee	Byron Brown	Mark J. F. Schroeder
Party	Democratic	Reform
Alliance	Working Families; Independence; Women's Equality
Popular vote	29,688	11,446
Percentage	67.67%	26.09%
- Results by city council district Brown: 50–60% 60–70% 80–90% Schroeder: 50–60%
Mayor before election
Byron Brown
Democratic
Elected mayor
Byron Brown
Democratic

The 2017 Buffalo mayoral election was held on November 7, 2017. Incumbent three-term Democratic mayor Byron Brown won re-election to a fourth term.

== Background ==
The 2017 Buffalo mayoral race was held to elect the mayor of Buffalo, New York. The incumbent, Byron Brown, successfully ran for re-election against city comptroller Mark J. F. Schroeder and Erie County legislator Betty Jean Grant. A primary took place on September 12, 2017. Brown won the primary with Schroeder as the runner up and Grant coming in third. Schroeder won the Reform Party primary and was on that line for the general election.

== Candidates ==
=== Democratic ===
- Byron Brown, incumbent mayor
- Betty Jean Grant, Erie County legislator
- Mark J. F. Schroeder, city comptroller of Buffalo

Democratic primary results
Party	Candidate	Votes	%
Democratic	Byron W. Brown (incumbent)	13,999	51.71%
Democratic	Mark J. F. Schroeder	9,538	35.23%
Democratic	Betty Jean Grant	3,446	12.73%
Democratic	Taniqua Simmons (write-in)	88	0.33%
Total votes		27,071	100%

=== Green ===
- Terrence Robinson, founding member of Preservation Buffalo Niagara, member of the Buffalo Preservation Board

=== Conservative ===
- Anita Howard, attorney

=== Reform ===
- Mark J. F. Schroeder, city comptroller of Buffalo

== Results ==
General election results
Party	Candidate	Votes	%
Democratic	Byron W. Brown (incumbent)	27,532	62.76%
Working Families	Byron W. Brown (incumbent)	1,228	2.80%
Independence	Byron W. Brown (incumbent)	609	1.39%
Women's Equality	Byron W. Brown (incumbent)	319	0.73%
Total	Byron W. Brown (incumbent)	29,688	67.67%
Reform	Mark J F Schroeder	11,446	26.09%
Conservative	Anita L. Howard	1,357	3.09%
Green	Terrence A. Robinson	1,276	2.91%
Independent	Taniqua Simmons (write-in)	102	0.23%
Total votes		43,869	100%
