= Common Council =

Common Council may refer to:

- The Court of Common Council, an elected body of the City of London Corporation
- Buffalo Common Council, the legislative branch of the Buffalo, NY City Government
- Los Angeles Common Council, the predecessor of the Los Angeles City Council which serves the City of Los Angeles, California today
- A city council in many cities in English-speaking countries
