= Mark J. F. Schroeder =

American politician (born 1955)

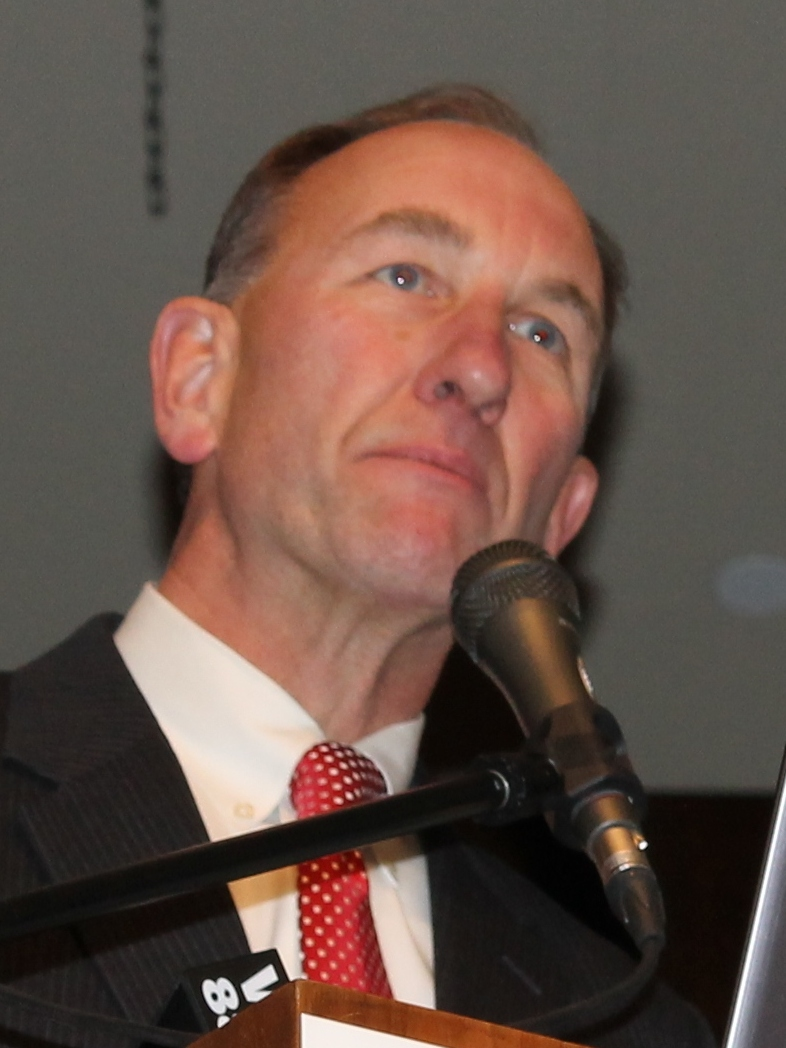
- Schroeder in 2015

Commissioner of the New York State Department of Motor Vehicles
- Incumbent
- Assumed office June 4, 2019
- Governor: Andrew Cuomo; Kathy Hochul
- Preceded by: Barbara J. Fiala

City Comptroller of Buffalo, New York
- In office January 1, 2012 – January 27, 2019
- Mayor: Byron Brown
- Preceded by: Andrew SanFilippo
- Succeeded by: Barbara Miller-Williams

Member of the New York State Assembly from the 145th district
- In office January 1, 2005 – December 31, 2011
- Preceded by: Brian Higgins
- Succeeded by: Mickey Kearns

Member of the Erie County Legislature from the 2nd district
- In office January 1, 2002 – December 31, 2004
- Preceded by: Michael A. Fitzpatrick
- Succeeded by: Tim Kennedy

Personal details
- Born: December 13, 1955 (age 70) Buffalo, New York, U.S.
- Party: Democratic
- Other political affiliations: Reform (2017)
- Spouse: Kathleen Horan
- Children: 3
- Education: SUNY Erie (AAS); Empire State College (BS)

Mark J. F. Schroeder (born December 13, 1955) is an American politician who currently serves as the commissioner of the New York State Department of Motor Vehicles. He previously served in the New York State Assembly and as comptroller of Buffalo, New York.

== Early life and education ==
Schroeder was raised in South Buffalo, New York, where he attended Public School #72, St. Thomas Aquinas School, and Bishop Timon – St. Jude High School. He received an A.A.S. degree from SUNY Erie in 1976, and a B.S. degree from Empire State College in 1982.

== Career ==
=== Erie County Legislature ===
In 2001, Schroeder ran for an open seat in the Erie County Legislature against conservative Joe Kelly of South Buffalo. As a County Legislator, he started the Greater South Buffalo Chamber of Commerce, which currently has more than 200 members and holds several community events every year. That same year, Schroeder founded the South Buffalo Education Center, which offers G.E.D. classes and computer and vocational training, helping more than 500 students receive their GEDs since 2002.

=== New York State Assembly ===
Schroeder was first elected to the Assembly in November 2004 and he was re-elected in November 2006. He won the November 2008 general election with 75 percent of the vote and ran uncontested in the November 2010 general election.

In 2010, Schroeder indicated he would not vote for Sheldon Silver as Speaker of the New York State Assembly, although both are Democrats.

=== Buffalo City Comptroller ===
In June 2011, he expressed interest in running for the position of Buffalo City Comptroller, which had been recently vacated by Andrew SanFilippo when he was appointed New York State Deputy Comptroller. He was expected to face opposition in a Democratic primary from Erie County Legislature Majority Leader Maria Whyte, but she withdrew from the race to instead run in a special election for Erie County Clerk. In November 2011, Schroeder was elected Buffalo City Comptroller, he was unopposed.

=== New York DMV Commissioner ===
On December 30, 2018, Schroeder announced he will be resigning from the City Comptroller's office to become the Commissioner of the New York State Department of Motor Vehicles.

== Personal life ==
Schroeder resides in South Buffalo, with his wife, Kathleen (née Horan), and their three children.

Political offices
Preceded by Michael A. Fitzpatrick	Erie County legislator, 2nd district January 1, 2002 – December 31, 2004	Succeeded by Tim Kennedy
Preceded by Andrew SanFilippo	Buffalo City Comptroller; January 1, 2012 – January 27, 2019	Incumbent
New York State Assembly
Preceded by Brian Higgins	Assemblyman for the 145th district January 1, 2005 – December 31, 2011	Vacant Title next held by Michael P. Kearns
