= Andrew SanFilippo =

Andrew A. SanFilippo was the Comptroller of Buffalo, New York. He is a career employee of the comptroller's office, who was elected comptroller in 2003. He previously served as executive assistant to the comptroller and for two decades as the city's investment and debt management officer. After former City Comptroller Anthony Nanula resigned in 2003 to become deputy state comptroller, he became the acting city comptroller. After losing the Democratic Primary, he was elected as a Republican in the 2003 election. In January 2007, he applied to the New York State Legislature for appointment to an unexpired term as New York State Comptroller. He testified before the Assembly Ways and Means Committee, the Senate Finance Committee, the Comptroller Search Committee on Jan. 24, 2007. He was not on the list of three finalists selected by the search committee for consideration by the full Legislature.

Political offices
Preceded by Anthony R. Nanula	Buffalo, New York City Comptroller; 2003 – March 2011	Succeeded by Mark J. F. Schroeder
Preceded by Mark P. Pattison	New York State Executive Deputy Comptroller Office of State and Local Government Accountability; March 2011 – present	Incumbent
