= Jack Quinn (politician) =

American politician (born 1951)

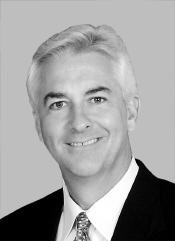

10th President of Erie Community College
- In office April 2008 – July 2017
- Preceded by: William Reuter (acting)
- Succeeded by: Dan Hocoy

Member of the U.S. House of Representatives from New York
- In office January 3, 1993 – January 3, 2005
- Preceded by: Louise Slaughter (redistricted)
- Succeeded by: Brian Higgins
- Constituency: 30th district (1993–2003); 27th district (2003–2005)

Town Supervisor of Hamburg
- In office 1984–1993
- Preceded by: Barbara Wicks
- Succeeded by: John Michalek

Personal details
- Born: John Francis Quinn Jr. April 13, 1951 (age 75) Buffalo, New York, U.S.
- Party: Republican
- Spouse: Mary McAndrews
- Children: 2, including Jack
- Education: Siena College (BA); State University of New York, Buffalo (MA)

John Francis Quinn Jr. (born April 13, 1951) is a retired American politician and academic administrator from the state of New York. He was a Republican member of the United States House of Representatives from 1993 to 2005, and went on to serve as president of Erie Community College (ECC) from 2008 to 2017.

A native of the Buffalo area, Quinn taught in Orchard Park, New York; worked at a steel plant; and before his election to Congress in 1992, was involved in local politics, sitting on the Hamburg Town Council, as well as serving as the town's supervisor. While in Congress, he was considered a moderately conservative Republican, and was active in numerous committees, subcommittees, and caucuses as chair or member. Prior to becoming a congressional representative, as well as being the town's supervisor. After leaving Congress and prior to taking the top leadership post at ECC, Quinn was also president of a lobbying firm in Washington, D.C.

== Background ==
Quinn was born in Buffalo, New York on April 13, 1951. His father, Jack Quinn Sr., was a locomotive engineer with the South Buffalo Railway, and also worked at the Erie County Public Library. Quinn's mother is Norma; and he has four brothers, Kevin, Jeffrey, Thomas, and Michael.

== Education ==
Quinn graduated from Siena College with a Bachelor of Arts degree in 1973 and the State University of New York at Buffalo in 1978 with a Master's degree in Education. Quinn also holds a school superintendent credential that he earned at the State University of New York at Fredonia.

== Pre-congressional career ==
Quinn was a middle school English teacher in the Orchard Park Central School District for 10 years, where he coached track and field, basketball, and football. Prior to entering the teaching field, Quinn briefly worked at the Bethlehem Steel Plant in Lackawanna, New York. He served on the Hamburg, New York Town Council from 1982 to 1984, followed by a stint as town supervisor until 1993.

== Congressional career ==
After the retirement of Congressman Henry Nowak, Quinn was elected to the House of Representatives in 1992 representing most of Buffalo and suburban Erie County in the 30th District. On paper, the district was heavily Democratic, and had been made even more Democratic after redistricting in 1992. However, Quinn defeated Erie County Executive Dennis Gorski in an upset. He was re-elected five more times by surprisingly wide margins in what was by far the most Democratic district in the nation to be represented by a Republican.

Quinn survived in this district in large part due to the close ties he developed with organized labor, something not common with most Republicans. Quinn worked to develop those ties even while voting against several programs and initiatives early in his career, a few of which included Amtrak subsidies, Social Security, and the Low Income Home Energy Assistant Program. Despite such votes and initially being an unknown, Quinn was successful in Buffalo, much as Jack Kemp was twenty years earlier. Quinn was also viewed as being honorable, and he did not have any character issues.

Despite a close relationship with Bill Clinton, whom he considers his friend, he voted for three of the articles of impeachment against him. There have been several suggestions that the House leadership pressured him into doing so, though Quinn, himself, denied this in a 1999 article in the Washington Post. Quinn stated that his position in regard to impeaching Clinton was “a vote of conscience” that was “a personal decision and personally painful”, though he initially stated that the situation did not merit impeachment. It has been reported that Clinton's 1999 visit to Buffalo after his State of the Union Address was in response to Quinn's votes.

During the 2002 redistricting process, one map had Quinn drawn into a district with a longtime friend, Democrat John LaFalce. Ultimately, his district was preserved and renumbered as the 27th District. It covered nearly all of his former territory and added Chautauqua County. This came after New York lost a district in the 2000 census. On paper, the new 27th was slightly more Republican than the old 30th. However, had it existed in 2000, Al Gore would have carried it with 53 percent of the vote, one of his best showings for a district represented by a Republican.

On April 26, 2004, Quinn announced he would not seek re-election. After leaving Congress, Quinn reported that he had a 70% approval rating while in his position.

=== Selected electoral history ===
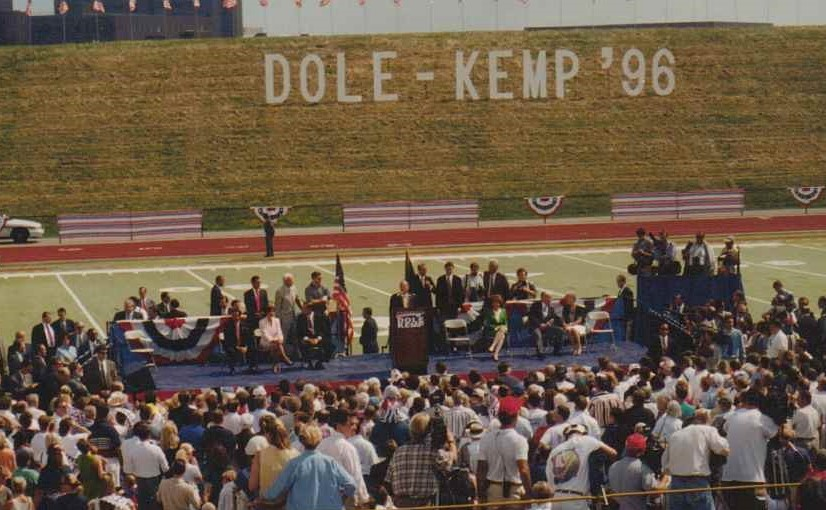
Jack Quinn (Standing on Main Stage, Rear, Second from Right) at 1996 Dole-Kemp Rally at the University at Buffalo, NY

Quinn's electoral history record has been tracked at Our Campaigns, and portions of it are also presented here.

Election Results, United States House of Representatives, 27th District, November 5, 2002
Party	Candidate	Votes	%	±%
Democratic	Peter Crotty	47,811	27.49	−41.57
Republican	Jack Quinn	120,117	69.07	0
Right to Life	Thomas Casey	3,586	2.06	−67.00
Green	Albert LaBruna	2,405	1.38	−67.68

- Quinn also ran on the Conservative ticket in this election.
- These election results reflect Quinn's largest margin of victory.

Election Results, United States House of Representatives, 30th District, November 3, 1992
Party	Candidate	Votes	%	±%
Democratic	Dennis Gorski	111,445	45.82	−5.88
Republican	Jack Quinn	125,734	51.70	0
Right to Life	Mary F. Refermat	6,025	2.48	−49.22

- Quinn also ran on the Change Congress ticket in this election.
- These election results represent Quinn's smallest margin of victory.

=== Duties ===
During his tenure in Congress, Quinn was a chair and/or active member of several committees, subcommittees, and caucuses.

Quinn was a member of the Transportation and Infrastructure Committee, where he served as chairman of the Railroads Subcommittee. On the Transportation and Infrastructure Committee, Quinn was a member of the Transportation Subcommittees on Aviation, Surface Transportation, Mass Transit, and Water and Environment.

Quinn chaired both the Executive Committee of the Congressional Steel Caucusand the Benefits Subcommittee. He further chaired the Republican Working Group on Labor. Quinn was also a member of the Veteran's Affairs Committee, and its related Subcommittee on Hospitals and Health Care. He served on the Joint Economic Committee as a member.

Further serving as a leader of Congressional committees, Quinn co-chaired both the Northern Border Caucus and the Northeast-Midwest Congressional Coalition.

Quinn was also a member of the Congressional Travel and Tourism Caucus; the Congressional Fire Services Caucus; and the Friends of Ireland Congressional Committee.

To aid his constituents, Quinn opened and closed more than 10,000 working cases during his time in Congress. This type of commitment to completing federal casework has been described as “legendary”.

=== Political views ===
Quinn's political affiliation is Republican Conservative to Republican Moderate-Conservative. His political views placed him as a centrist between Democrats and Republicans on most issues on which he voted in Congress in 2004. Much later in his congressional career, his voting record was typically in the middle, falling between Democratic and Republican views.

In his first year in Congress, Congressional Quarterly reported that Quinn's voting record was 84–85% Republican in support of the party line. During his first year, while there were issues that he voted in favor of, there were also those that he voted against, including a $16 million community development stimulus package for Buffalo. The Buffalo News reported that Quinn's consistency in voting along Republican party lines was reflected in 87% of his votes by 2001.

Regarding Quinn's vote against the $16 million Buffalo stimulus package, Buffalo's Fillmore Council Member David A. Franczyk was quoted in a Buffalo News article by Jerry Zremski on January 1, 1994, stating:

Jack Quinn is hurting this community.

A portion of Quinn's voting record has been tracked, online, regarding issues such as abortion, education, energy and the environment, gay marriage, healthcare, homeland security, immigration, social security, stem cell research, taxes, the economy, the second amendment (the right to keep and bear arms), and both the War in Afghanistan and the War in Iraq.

Regarding abortion, Quinn has stated that he is opposed to allowing women to have them. In 1994, Democrat Ellen T. Kennedy criticized Quinn for voting against a bill that would make it a crime to block abortion clinic access. Kennedy noted that Quinn's 1993 approval rating from a group that supports abortion rights, the National Abortion Reproductive Rights Action League, was 5%.

Particular stances regarding certain issues that Quinn holds include being against both gay marriage and the legalization of marijuana. He is a proponent of Alaska/offshore oil drilling, Bush tax cuts, capital punishment, labor, life, and social security privatization. Quinn also supported campaign finance reform.

In 1998 at Canisius College in Buffalo, Quinn hosted fellow Congress Member John Lewis, a Democrat and African-American from Georgia who marched with Martin Luther King Jr. in the civil rights movement. The talk in which the two congressional leaders participated was regarding race relations and how they can be improved. The event was attending largely by African-Americans, and was suggested to be an attempt at increasing bloc voter support for Quinn among the Black community in Buffalo.

At the 1998 dialogue at Canisius College between Quinn and Lewis, Quinn was quoted in The Buffalo News about race relations:

We believe a discussion about race is important, not only nationally, but in our own neighborhoods. That discussion needs to take place not only in the Congress, but in statehouses, county legislatures, in block clubs, and in the streets.

It has been suggested that Quinn would have been better to be a Democrat in Buffalo, though as a Republican, he appeared to garner more Republican support in Congress than a Democrat would have. In reality, Quinn has been asked if he would become Democrat, and has not directly answered that question. At that time he was asked in 1996, he stated that there were more important issues at hand, such as balancing the budget, than to which political party one was affiliated.

=== Support of selected, specific issues ===
Quinn was a supporter of Amtrak, working to maintain its prominence in the country's infrastructure, and improve the safety of passengers. Quinn has described himself as an “unabashed Amtrak supporter.”

Quinn worked to achieve the passage of the Railroad Retirement Survivors Act that became law in 2001.

Regarding the Railroad Retirement Survivors Act, urging that the Railroad Retirement Act of 1974 be amended, Quinn stated in a letter to fellow Congress members, being re-quoted on page 9 of The Locomotive Engineer Newsletter in June 1997:

During the lifetime of the employee and the spouse, the employee receives a full annuity and so does the spouse. However, after the employees' death, only a widow's or widower's annuity is payable. The inadequate spousal annuity of the current system often leaves the survivor with less than the amount of income needed to meet ordinary and necessary living expenses. Coming from a railroad family, I have seen firsthand the hard work and long hours that go into working on the railroad. The benefits that come along with the life of a railroader are well deserved but more importantly are paid for from within the railroad industry itself. No contributions from American taxpayers are needed. Put simply, an agreement among railroad industry groups for adequately funding annuity reform is what is needed.

Quinn was a proponent for rejuvenating both Buffalo's waterfront and inner harbor, as well as the Erie Canal Corridor.

In a news release by the United States Department of Housing and Urban Development (HUD) on August 15, 1999, Quinn stated:

HUD recognizes the importance of Buffalo's Inner Harbor as an integral part of the Erie Canal. A 'new' Erie Canal can only bring prosperity to our state, including Buffalo, by increasing tourism, and attracting new businesses and new jobs. It is important for us to restore and maintain the quality of the Erie Canal for its historical and cultural value. I have worked hard to bring in more than $37 million in federal funds for the development of the waterfront. There is no doubt that this development is essential for Buffalo's future success.

Interested in maintaining the strength of teaching hospitals in New York State, Quinn introduced bipartisan legislation known as The Quinn–Lowey Hospital Emergency Assistance Act (H.R. 2266), co-sponsored by Congress Member Nita Lowey, that aimed to preserve Medicare payments to hospitals. The budget crisis of 1997 contributed to the reduction of funding to hospitals, and the bill aimed to maintain government funding payments to hospitals at their prior levels.

Regarding Medicare funding for hospitals in relation to "The Quinn–Lowey Hospital Emergency Assistance Act," Quinn was quoted in a July 28, 1999 official press release, stating:

Teaching hospitals are a necessity in serving the elderly and for training doctors. In order for the U.S. to continue being the world leader in graduate medical education, we must continue Medicare's commitment to our teaching hospitals ... every hospital in every state would benefit from this bill, whether it's in a rural, urban or suburban area ... Medicare DSH payments are an absolute necessity. Subjecting DSH to the federal government's annual budget process where it would have to compete against other important federal priorities would represent a wholly inappropriate shift of what is properly a Medicare responsibility to general revenues.

=== Honors ===
Quinn received numerous awards during his work in Congress. Quinn received the AMVETS Silver Helmet Award for working on behalf of veterans; and the Legislative Leadership Award from the National Coalition of Homeless Veterans.

Quinn also received the Government Service Award from the Buffalo American Federation of Labor and Congress of Industrial Organizations (AFL–CIO) Council for his support of working women and men; and the Spirit of Enterprise Award from the United States Chamber of Commerce.

From the National Association of Railroad Passengers, Quinn received the Golden Spike Award. In recognition of Quinn's support for railway safety, he was given Operation Lifesaver 's Congressional Appreciation Award.

From his alma mater, Siena College, Quinn received the Joseph A. Buff Distinguished Alumni Award for Career Achievement, and the Bernadine of Siena Medal for service.

Quinn was also named one of the Top 50 "Most Effective" Lawmakers in Washington by Congressional Quarterly.

Further awards that Quinn has won include the Public Service Award from Niagara Frontier Parks and Recreation Society; the Good Citizen Medal of the National Society of the Sons of the American Revolution; the Humanitarian Award from the Erie County Office for the Disabled; and the Distinguished Graduate Award from the National Catholic Elementary Schools Association.

Quinn was honored with the Friend of the Farm Bureau Award. Quinn received this national recognition award for having demonstrated an active and strong record that is consistent with the American farmer's needs.

=== Reflections of others ===
Congressional colleagues saluted Quinn on his work upon his retirement. Congress Members Sue Kelly, Thomas M. Reynolds, and Edolphus Towns made statements in Congress, honoring him for his accomplishments.

On December 6, 2004, Congress Member Sue Kelly stated of Quinn, as quoted in Capitol Words:

When it comes to obtaining federal assistance toward New York's widespread transportation needs, Jack Quinn has fought and won millions of dollars for our state. It has been an honor to work together with him on the House Transportation and Infrastructure Committee. During his 12 years in Congress, Jack Quinn also has distinguished himself by enhancing New York's agriculture industry, protecting our veterans, and advocating the American worker on labor issues.

Congress Member Tom Reynolds also recognized Quinn for his congressional achievements, with the following statement in the December 7, 2004 issue of Capitol Words:

Throughout his entire career, Jack always acted with the best interests of New Yorkers in mind. As the chairman of the House Republican Working Group on Labor, Jack was the “go-to guy” in our conference on a wide variety of labor-related issues. His positions on both the Transportation and Infrastructure Committee and the Veterans' Affairs Committee allowed Jack to do important work on behalf of our Nation's veteran community and passenger rail systems, employees and customers, issues that were of great importance to him.

Congress Member Edolphus Towns shared in Congress further congressional accomplishments of Quinn, being quoted on November 17, 2004 in Capitol Words:

As chairman of the Railroads Subcommittee, Jack has been a strong and consistent voice in fighting hard for preserving Amtrak. Amtrak remains a critical part of our transportation infrastructure, especially in New York and along the Northeast corridor. Jack's leadership on this issue has greatly benefited all of us who rely on this important national passenger rail system. In fact, his commitment to this issue earned him the Golden Spike Award from the National Association of Railroad Passengers. Safety on railways is another key issue for Representative Quinn.

== Post-congressional career ==
After leaving Congress, Quinn joined the Washington, D.C. lobbying firm, Cassidy & Associates as President.

=== As President of Erie Community College ===
Quinn was appointed President of Erie Community College in 2008. There were 59 candidates who were nationally-considered for the post; and the consensus by the ECC Board of Trustees was to appoint Quinn.

As the top leader of ECC, Quinn has presided over rising enrollments at the College during a time of decreasing or flat budgetary support from Erie County and the State of New York. ECC obtains approximately 19% of its financial support from Erie County. Quinn understands the need for proper funding for ECC.

Regarding the need for increased funding for ECC, Quinn was quoted in a January 20, 2008 McClatchy – Business Tribune News article by Jay Rey:

Money is short. I dealt with this as a member of Congress. I dealt with this as the supervisor of Hamburg. We're going to have to be creative.

Quinn also has the advantage of having lived "the ECC experience" – as he termed it – within his own family. Quinn's wife, Mary Beth, attended ECC, taking courses for her nursing degree in their earlier years when the couple was also raising their family.

== Community involvement ==
In 2008, Quinn was the dinner chair of the American Ireland Fund gala. The American Ireland Fund raises monies to support community development, peace, reconciliation, arts, culture, and education in Ireland.

Quinn has also been either a member or chair of many civic organizations. He has chaired the Hamburg Industrial Development Agency. Additionally, he is or has been a member of the BryhLin Foundation; the Greater Buffalo Chapter of the American Red Cross; Hamburg Kiwanis Club; the Knights of Columbus; and the Hamburg Chamber of Commerce. He has also been a member of the United Way of Western New York; the Greater Buffalo Chamber of Commerce; and the Southtowns Sewage Treatment Agency. Further, he served on the boards of St. Francis High School in Athol Springs, New York; and the New York State Advisory Council of the American Red Cross.

== 2020 Presidential Election ==
On August 24, 2020, Quinn was one of 24 former Republican lawmakers to endorse Democratic nominee Joe Biden on the opening day of the Republican National Convention.

== Family and personal life ==
Quinn is married to his wife, Mary Beth, and has two adult children, Jack III and Kara Elizabeth. Quinn's son, Jack Quinn III, is a former member of the New York State Assembly, the youngest ever to serve in New York State.

U.S. House of Representatives
Preceded by Louise Slaughter	Member of the U.S. House of Representatives from New York's 30th congressional district 1993–2003	Constituency abolished
Preceded by Thomas M. Reynolds	Member of the U.S. House of Representatives from New York's 27th congressional district 2003–2005	Succeeded by Brian Higgins
U.S. order of precedence (ceremonial)
Preceded by Raymond J. McGrath as Former U.S. Representative	Order of precedence of the United States as Former U.S. Representative	Succeeded by Sue Kelly as Former U.S. Representative
