= Anthony Nanula =

American politician

Anthony R. Nanula

Member of the New York State Senate from the 57th district
- In office 1994–1999
- Preceded by: Anthony Masiello
- Succeeded by: Al Coppola

Comptroller of Buffalo, New York
- In office 2000–2003
- Preceded by: Joel Giambra
- Succeeded by: Andrew SanFilippo

Personal details
- Born: December 9, 1965 (age 60) Niagara Falls, New York, U.S.
- Party: Democratic
- Occupation: Real estate developer, investment banker, businessperson

Anthony Richard Nanula (born December 9, 1965) is an American real estate developer, investment banker, political leader, and philanthropist from Buffalo, New York.

Anthony Nanula is the chief investment officer of Sinatra & Company Real Estate. He also served as the president and CEO of Niagara International Capital, Ltd., a founder and managing partner of American Coastal Properties, and is a principal of The Nanco Group, owned by the Nanula Family. He previously represented District 57 in the New York State Senate, and served as city comptroller for the City of Buffalo and deputy state comptroller for the State of New York.

== Early life and education ==
Nanula was born in Niagara Falls, New York, and is the son of Savino P. Nanula, the former chairman and CEO of Tops Friendly Markets, and Eileen E. (Hughes) Nanula (July 10, 1931 – October 12, 2014). He has three brothers. His paternal grandparents were born in Italy. Nanula attended Niagara-Wheatfield High School, graduating in 1984. He graduated from Syracuse University in 1988, earning a dual Bachelor of Science degree in marketing and transportation and distribution (supply chain) management. During his time at Syracuse University, he joined the Sigma Chi Fraternity.

== New York State Senate ==
Nanula, a local businessman, was elected in a 1994 special election to serve in the State Senate, succeeding Anthony Masiello who resigned from the Senate to become Buffalo's mayor. Nanula, who self-funded his campaign, represented parts of Buffalo and Tonawanda and all of Niagara Falls and Grand Island. At 28 years old, Nanula was elected as one of the youngest state senators in New York State Senate history. He was reelected to the State Senate three times. During his Senate career, he flirted with a statewide bid for Lieutenant Governor of New York in 1998, but decided against the Democratic primary for the post. He did indicate that he was interested in running for State Comptroller if the position became available.

While serving in the Senate, he served as the Assistant Minority Leader for Policy and Administration, as Ranking Minority Member of the Senate Insurance Committee, as Ranking Minority Member of the Senate Civil Service and Pensions Committee, and as Ranking Minority Member of the Senate Tourism, Recreation and Sports Development Committee. He is the second freshman senator to be appointed to the Senate Finance Committee and he was a member of the Senate Rules Committee.

== Buffalo City Comptroller ==
In 1999, Nanula ran for the open position of Buffalo City Comptroller, when the incumbent, Joel Giambra, stepped down to run for Erie County Executive. During his campaign, Nanula was criticized by opponents for wanting the position in order to better his credentials to run for state comptroller. Nanula was elected defeating Common Council Minority Leader Kevin Helfer.

In 2001 and 2002, after State Comptroller Carl McCall launched a campaign for governor, Nanula announced his candidacy for the Democratic nomination for State Comptroller. Nanula campaigned around the state and then dropped out of the race before the primary and endorsed former New York City Comptroller Alan Hevesi.

After Hevesi was elected State Comptroller, he appointed Nanula as a Deputy State Comptroller. Nanula resigned his city post to accept the state post. As a Deputy State Comptroller, Nanula was responsible for advising local governments on financial issues and for upstate economic development policy.

== Business career ==
Nanula began his career working for his father's grocery store, Tops Friendly Markets. From 1988 to 1994, Nanula served as the President of Nanco Enterprises, Inc. a New York based commercial and industrial park operator and developer. In 1992, he and his three brothers co-founded Essex Homes of WNY, Inc., a well-respected regional homebuilder. Essex has built over 1,300 mid-market and upscale homes throughout New York. He was responsible in co-founding North America Center, a 425-acre industrial and commercial park in Western New York. It exists today as one of the largest public/private real estate partnerships in New York State history.

== Business ventures and investments ==
Anthony Nanula is the Chief Investment Officer of Sinatra & Company Real Estate. He also serves as the Principal of The Nanco Group, owned by the highly respected Nanula Family, well known for their successes in the retail marketplace with Tops Friendly Markets and more recently Wilson Farms Stores. In 2005, he and his brothers successfully led a leveraged buyout of Wilson Farms, a subsidiary of Tops Friendly Markets, which was sold to 7-Eleven in 2011. Wilson Farms was a chain of approximately 200 convenience stores and was ranked as one of the 50 largest convenience chains in the country.

In 2004, Nanula launched Niagara International Capital Ltd., a registered Broker Dealer (Member FINRA and SIPC) and Registered Investment Adviser that provides investment banking and strategic advisory services, asset management and retail brokerage accounts, and registration and compliance support services to advisors, RIAs and investment banking teams.

In 2012, Nanula co-founded American Coastal Properties (ACP), a Southern California based luxury real estate development company. Nanula is a principal investor and Managing Partner for ACP.

== Family and personal life ==
Nanula and his wife, Holly, live in Buffalo, New York with their son Savino, and daughters, Alexa and Isabella. Nanula is a born-again Christian.

New York State Senate
Preceded by Anthony Masiello	New York State Senate, 57th District; 1994–1999	Succeeded by Al Coppola
Political offices
Preceded by Joel Giambra	Comptroller of Buffalo, New York; 2000 – 2003	Succeeded by Andrew SanFilippo
