= Kevin Gaughan =

American lawyer (born 1954)

Kevin P. Gaughan (born March 17, 1954) is an attorney and an advocate of government reform, in particular for the establishment of regional government and regional consciousness within the Buffalo-Niagara region, which encompasses the cities of Buffalo, New York and Niagara Falls, New York, their suburbs and surrounding rural areas.

Gaughan became a nationally recognized advocate of regionalism largely because of a series of regionalism conferences at the Chautauqua Institution in which he organized in 1997.

In 1998 he was named a citizen of the year by the Buffalo News. In 2001 he became the youngest recipient of the Red Jacket Medal, awarded by the Buffalo History Museum for civic leadership. He graduated from Harvard University before he studied law at Georgetown University and international relations at the London School of Economics.

== Politics ==
In 1990 he ran unsuccessfully against former Congressman Bill Paxon for the 31st Congressional District. After serving for a few years as a legislative aide in the Erie County Legislature he opened a law office in the Buffalo suburb of Hamburg. He ran again in the 1994 contest and lost in the primary.

In 2001 he sought the Republican endorsement to run for the mayoralty of Buffalo and withdrew from the race once it was given to Anthony Masiello. He again tried to run for the office of mayor for the City of Buffalo in 2005 losing the Democratic primary to State Senator and eventual mayor Byron Brown. As a result of this failed bid for mayor Gaughan was sued by the Hyatt Hotel over a $10,000 debt. In early 2006 he launched an abortive campaign for the senate seat vacated by Brown, but dropped out at the urging of local Democratic Party leaders, who backed another candidate. In 2007 he lobbied Erie County Democratic Chairman Len Lenihan for appointment as Erie County Clerk that was going to be vacant due to the departure of David Swarts to become Commissioner of the New York State Department of Motor Vehicles.

Gaughan announced his entry into a primary election against New York State Assemblyman Sean Ryan in June 2012; Gaughan lost. He also ran for the office of Erie County Comptroller in 2013 but lost to Stefan I. Mychajliw Jr..

== Writings and activism ==
Gaughan wrote At First Light: Strengthening Buffalo Niagara in the New Century which was published by the Canisius College Press in 2003. The book is a collection of speeches and short essays by Gaughan on such subjects as regionalism, government reform, race relations, US and local history, and patriotism.

In late 2006, he released the results of a study entitled The Cost which detailed the amount paid to elected and appointed officials at various levels of government in the Buffalo-Niagara region. He compared this to other regions and found that Buffalo-Niagara had significantly more paid elected officials than other regions in both absolute and per capita measures. Additionally, a high number of small towns replicating services- such as police, highway maintenance and parks departments lead to a higher number of civil-service government employees. Gaughan used these numbers to support his thesis that entire layers of government should be done away with in Buffalo-Niagara.

== Downsizing movement ==
Gaughan has been a proponent of "downsizing" town and village boards, generally from five members to three. He sees this as a cost-saving measure. On June 3, 2009, the towns of West Seneca and Evans both passed the measures by large margins. On September 23, 2009, the town of Orchard Park passed a measure cutting its Town Board by two members by nearly a two-to-one margin.

On September 29, 2009, the town of Alden voted 1,052 to 1,020 in favor of reducing the size of its town council. While Gaughan is the most visible proponent of downsizing in Western New York, there have been various groups in each of the towns which have aligned themselves with or distanced themselves from Gaughan to various degrees. In 2010, Gaughan campaigned to dissolve the villages of Sloan and Williamsville. The villages held dissolution referendums on August 17, 2010, and both failed overwhelmingly with "no" votes exceeding 80%.

On September 23, 2010, Grand Island, New York became the first town to successfully resist the Gaughan downsizing and consolidation plan by voting down the referendum 2,155 NO votes to 1,805 YES votes. The decision was made by a 350-vote margin; and the turnout, for what was a special election, superseded the primary election some 2 weeks earlier by roughly 500 votes. Grand Island Republican Party Committeeman Mark William Webb, took a visible stand against what they felt was an intrusion into their government from external forces. Webb argued, "It's much harder to corrupt four men in a room than two", adding, "[W]e're a very strong community. We're a proud community. We love this town."

The village of Farnham, New York had a dissolution vote September 28, 2010. Farnham Mayor Terry L. Caber Sr. said he believes that village government is most efficient. "The bottom line is, I just want to make sure the residents really understand the full picture, the full impact, and let them make the decision". Voters rejected the Farnham dissolution referendum.

The towns of West Seneca and Alden revisited the downsizing and voted to keep their downsized boards in 2012.

In 2015 the town of Hamburg voted to return to a 5 member Town Board.

The voters of the town of West Seneca will determine whether or not to return to a 5 member town board in the 2018 general election after a petition was filed calling for the vote by the Committee to Restore Representation in West Seneca.

In 2019 an Orchard Park group headed by Nan Ackerman petitioned to have the board upsized to five members. Voters approved the referendum and on January 1, 2022 Orchard Park returned to a five member board.

== The Gaughan Plan ==
Gaughan presented his "Gaughan Plan" on regionalism to the Erie County Legislature Government Affairs Committee on April 27, 2005. The plan is as follows:

I (Kevin P. Gaughan) propose a sweeping reform of our present government structure and creation of one new, unified government for Buffalo and Erie County.

Simultaneous to establishing the new government, we must seize the initiative and address related policies and practices that hold back our city and its economy.

BUFFALO METROPOLITAN GOVERNMENT "THE BMG"

1. The New Government's Structure

Executive Branch Executive / Mayor: Elected county-wide; the chief executive officer and chief fiscal officer, in accordance with existing municipal corporation law. Urban Advocate: Elected county-wide; powers are a hybrid of New York City consumer advocate and United States vice president; serves as president of the legislature with tie-breaking vote authority. Oversees the BMG's service delivery in and public policies for the urban core.

Legislative Branch 5 Inner Ring Members: each of whom represent a district that includes a portion of the City of Buffalo, along with certain election districts in "inner ring" portions of the towns of Amherst, Cheektowaga, Tonawanda, West Seneca, Hamburg, and the City of Lackawanna (equal to 50% of county population.) 5 Outer Ring Members: whose districts represent the balance of the "built-up" and rural suburbs (equal to 50% of county population.) Urban Advocate: presides over the body; possesses voting right in the event of tie; thereby assures that all policy matters before the legislature will be viewed from an urban center perspective. This legislature would unite in interest Buffalo with its inner ring suburbs by tying those areas that share social-economic make-up (measured by per capita income, housing stock value; number of free school lunches). In effect, this would "enlarge" the city not through annexation, but through drawing the new government's legislative districts to reflect today's reality. Kevin Gaughan's legislative plan conceives of a ten-member body with an eleventh member to cast a tie-breaking vote.

2. IDA Consolidation At its inception, the suburbs do not participate in the new government. As a result, and to build confidence among city residents that the suburbs will sacrifice as well, there must be suburban sacrifice of individual benefit for a collective good. The birth of the newly merged city-county government should coincide with culmination of the lengthy debate to consolidate our several IDA's into one.

3. Coordinate Governance and Education Reforms The Erie County Association of School Boards (ECASB) is currently conducting a study to determine whether to reduce the number of school districts from thirty. Their decision will affect how students are educated throughout the county, including in the Buffalo School District. Reform efforts should not be conducted in separate vacuums, but rather be viewed as all of a piece, intended to strengthen the urban core and create a successful regional economy. To accomplish this, the city-county merger commission should collaborate with the ECASB to begin long-range plans for creating a viable urban school district.

4. Land Use and Regional Planning Creation of the new government should also coincide with re-establishment of a Buffalo-Niagara planning council to organize regional growth in sustainable manner, re-direct investment into Buffalo, protect our area's rural settings, and create consensus on those centers where we wish to concentrate commercial investment.

5. Public Transportation The new government will open the door for public transportation reforms to re-connect inner city workers with growing employment opportunities in suburban locales.

6. Training for Displaced Government Employees The purpose of consolidating local governments is not to put people out of work, but rather to help create an investment climate to attract more private employers. In the short term, however, combining two large governments may result in a need for less personnel. Just as our community did for displaced private steel industry workers in the late 1970s, we should be willing to create a support structure for public employees affected by reform. I envision a training and development center funded by a business / philanthropic community joint venture. Perhaps Erie Community College, which participated in steelworkers placement, can contribute to this effort as well.

7. Region-wide Competition to Name New Government

Buffalo County, Greater Buffalo, the BMG, Regional City of Buffalo –I think we can do better. Let's tap into our abundant creative capital by conducting a contest to name the new government. It will symbolize the inclusive nature of the new entity, capture the imagination of young Western New Yorkers, and add excitement to the enterprise.

== See also ==
- Unigov
- Council of Governments

== Sources ==
- Gaughan, Kevin P. At First Light: Strengthening Buffalo Niagara in the New Century. Buffalo, New York: Canisius College Press, 2003.
