= Golden Snowball Award =

Award for most snowfall in Upstate New York

- Awarded for: most snowfall in a season
- Currently held by: Syracuse, New York

Highlights
- Most wins: Syracuse, New York (14)
- Website: goldensnowball.com

The Golden Snowball Award is an annual award presented to the city in Upstate New York that receives the most snowfall in a season. The original award was the result of a friendly competition between National Weather Service (NWS) offices in Upstate New York.

Originally conceived after the Great Lakes Blizzard of 1977, the competition died out after the Rochester and Syracuse NWS offices closed in the mid-1990s. However, the award was revived during the 2002–2003 snowfall season when Patrick DeCoursey started a website to inform people about the past competition. Syracuse won for the 2002-2003 season and then won for every year from then through the 2010–2011 season. In the 2011–2012 season, Rochester was the first city other than Syracuse to win since the award's revival. Rochester also received temporary possession of a trophy for the year. The original competition's trophy has been lost, prompting its replacement with a new one donated by a trophy shop in Syracuse. The current Golden Snowball trophy resides in Syracuse City Hall.

Compared to Syracuse's average snowfall of 127.8 inches, or over 10 feet per year, New York City's annual snow average is a relatively small 2–3 feet per year in the city and about 3–4 feet per year in nearby suburbs. This is due to a number of factors, including lower latitude and oceanic influence keeping much of the precipitation as rain in the winter, combined with distance from the Great Lakes keeping the city well away from the influence of lake-effect snow. For the first time ever, during the 2005–2006 winter season New York City did have more snowfall than Albany, mainly due to the Blizzard of 2006, which was the city's biggest snowfall to date, while Albany was on the extreme northern fringe.

The cities that compete for the award are:

- Albany
- Binghamton
- Buffalo
- Rochester
- Syracuse

Until the 2006–2007 season, several other cities with different methods of measuring snow than the five competing cities also competed for a smaller award, that includes a $50 check. These are:

- Fulton
- Oswego
- Utica
- Watertown

== Winners of the Golden Snowball ==
- 2002–2003: Syracuse
- 2003–2004: Syracuse
- 2004–2005: Syracuse
- 2005–2006: Syracuse
- 2006–2007: Syracuse
- 2007–2008: Syracuse
- 2008–2009: Syracuse
- 2009–2010: Syracuse
- 2010–2011: Syracuse
- 2011–2012: Rochester
- 2012–2013: Syracuse
- 2013–2014: Syracuse
- 2014–2015: Syracuse
- 2015–2016: Syracuse
- 2016–2017: Binghamton
- 2017–2018: Syracuse
- 2018–2019: Buffalo (Mayor Refused Award)
- 2019–2020: Rochester
- 2020–2021: Binghamton
- 2021–2022: Buffalo
- 2022–2023: Buffalo
- 2023–2024: Buffalo
- 2024–2025: Syracuse
- 2025–2026: Syracuse

== Snowfall by season ==
Note: Official National Weather Service snowfall statistics were not kept at the current locations for Binghamton and Syracuse until the 1951–52 season.

All measurements are in inches.

| Season | Albany | Binghamton | Buffalo | Rochester | Syracuse | City With Most Snow |
|---|---|---|---|---|---|---|
| 1940-41 | 51.7 | | 79.3 | 73.7 | | Buffalo |
| 1941-42 | 45.2 | | 89.6 | 66.3 | | Buffalo |
| 1942-43 | 45.0 | | 85.5 | 70.6 | | Buffalo |
| 1943-44 | 48.6 | | 58.0 | 46.1 | | Buffalo |
| 1944-45 | 66.8 | | 120.7 | 94.7 | | Buffalo |
| 1945-46 | 54.9 | | 110.5 | 49.5 | | Buffalo |
| 1946-47 | 43.1 | | 65.4 | 75.5 | | Rochester |
| 1947-48 | 90.0 | | 42.1 | 63.4 | | Albany |
| 1948-49 | 44.2 | | 40.1 | 50.9 | | Rochester |
| 1949-50 | 62.6 | | 88.7 | 81.7 | | Buffalo |
| Season | Albany | Binghamton | Buffalo | Rochester | Syracuse | City With Most Snow |
| 1950-51 | 48.3 | | 71.4 | 75.8 | | Rochester |
| 1951-52 | 69.4 | 72.2 | 83.0 | 75.8 | 100.5 | Syracuse |
| 1952-53 | 46.0 | 70.4 | 55.9 | 41.7 | 79.4 | Syracuse |
| 1953-54 | 48.4 | 65.1 | 89.9 | 77.5 | 91.3 | Syracuse |
| 1954-55 | 36.6 | 94.8 | 84.8 | 69.2 | 101.4 | Syracuse |
| 1955-56 | 80.2 | 122.6 | 105.2 | 121.4 | 146.8 | Syracuse |
| 1956-57 | 70.3 | 90.2 | 113.7 | 79.2 | 76.1 | Buffalo |
| 1957-58 | 74.4 | 111.0 | 124.7 | 130.8 | 143.8 | Syracuse |
| 1958-59 | 63.2 | 78.7 | 114.5 | 140.6 | 137.2 | Rochester |
| 1959-60 | 60.1 | 105.3 | 115.6 | 161.7 | 134.8 | Rochester |
| Season | Albany | Binghamton | Buffalo | Rochester | Syracuse | City With Most Snow |
| 1960-61 | 72.7 | 99.7 | 102.4 | 89.4 | 130.5 | Syracuse |
| 1961-62 | 62.6 | 65.6 | 101.4 | 65.6 | 77.3 | Buffalo |
| 1962-63 | 71.3 | 95.3 | 89.8 | 76.4 | 118.3 | Syracuse |
| 1963-64 | 77.0 | 103.3 | 71.5 | 92.0 | 83.8 | Binghamton |
| 1964-65 | 45.8 | 76.4 | 70.9 | 71.1 | 97.3 | Syracuse |
| 1965-66 | 67.1 | 83.7 | 98.3 | 103.2 | 118.8 | Syracuse |
| 1966-67 | 80.9 | 88.5 | 66.1 | 74.0 | 87.5 | Binghamton |
| 1967-68 | 42.2 | 63.6 | 71.6 | 76.7 | 81.2 | Syracuse |
| 1968-69 | 63.3 | 64.5 | 78.4 | 79.8 | 99.7 | Syracuse |
| 1969-70 | 87.7 | 115.8 | 120.5 | 119.6 | 127.6 | Syracuse |
| Season | Albany | Binghamton | Buffalo | Rochester | Syracuse | City With Most Snow |
| 1970-71 | 112.5 | 108.6 | 97.0 | 142.7 | 157.2 | Syracuse |
| 1971-72 | 89.3 | 106.2 | 109.9 | 105.1 | 133.7 | Syracuse |
| 1972-73 | 70.9 | 67.7 | 78.8 | 73.0 | 82.2 | Syracuse |
| 1973-74 | 58.3 | 86.7 | 88.7 | 99.1 | 123.2 | Syracuse |
| 1974-75 | 54.6 | 67.1 | 95.6 | 91.2 | 105.5 | Syracuse |
| 1975-76 | 54.2 | 76.3 | 82.5 | 86.2 | 95.8 | Syracuse |
| 1976-77 | 70.6 | 74.4 | 199.4 | 92.1 | 145.0 | Buffalo |
| 1977-78 | 92.4 | 115.3 | 154.3 | 160.9 | 161.2 | Syracuse |
| 1978-79 | 63.5 | 80.0 | 97.3 | 138.5 | 118.5 | Rochester |
| 1979-80 | 27.4 | 56.8 | 68.4 | 72.2 | 93.4 | Syracuse |
| Season | Albany | Binghamton | Buffalo | Rochester | Syracuse | City With Most Snow |
| 1980-81 | 44.9 | 59.3 | 60.9 | 94.4 | 79.0 | Rochester |
| 1981-82 | 97.1 | 81.6 | 112.4 | 128.4 | 137.3 | Syracuse |
| 1982-83 | 75.0 | 81.0 | 52.4 | 59.9 | 66.0 | Binghamton |
| 1983-84 | 65.2 | 70.9 | 132.5 | 118.0 | 113.6 | Buffalo |
| 1984-85 | 41.3 | 62.5 | 107.2 | 87.1 | 116.4 | Syracuse |
| 1985-86 | 62.5 | 76.3 | 114.7 | 70.7 | 105.3 | Buffalo |
| 1986-87 | 80.6 | 78.8 | 67.5 | 67.1 | 103.4 | Syracuse |
| 1987-88 | 76.7 | 81.6 | 56.4 | 69.8 | 113.2 | Syracuse |
| 1988-89 | 19.0 | 47.8 | 67.4 | 86.6 | 97.8 | Syracuse |
| 1989-90 | 57.9 | 74.8 | 93.7 | 105.8 | 153.0 | Syracuse |
| Season | Albany | Binghamton | Buffalo | Rochester | Syracuse | City With Most Snow |
| 1990-91 | 28.7 | 67.0 | 57.5 | 68.3 | 96.9 | Syracuse |
| 1991-92 | 30.7 | 56.0 | 92.8 | 110.6 | 167.0 | Syracuse |
| 1992-93 | 94.2 | 122.7 | 93.2 | 131.5 | 192.1 | Syracuse |
| 1993-94 | 88.1 | 131.3 | 112.7 | 126.2 | 163.8 | Syracuse |
| 1994-95 | 30.9 | 52.8 | 74.6 | 56.2 | 66.9 | Buffalo |
| 1995-96 | 86.5 | 134.0 | 141.4 | 130.3 | 170.9 | Syracuse |
| 1996-97 | 66.6 | 93.0 | 97.6 | 104.7 | 131.1 | Syracuse |
| 1997-98 | 52.3 | 92.0 | 75.6 | 99.7 | 134.7 | Syracuse |
| 1998-99 | 44.1 | 73.3 | 100.5 | 111.6 | 98.3 | Rochester |
| 1999-00 | 62.1 | 82.4 | 63.6 | 110.7 | 85.8 | Rochester |
| Season | Albany | Binghamton | Buffalo | Rochester | Syracuse | City With Most Snow |
| 2000-01 | 77.1 | 112.6 | 158.7 | 133.0 | 191.9 | Syracuse |
| 2001-02 | 47.4 | 63.5 | 132.4 | 58.1 | 59.4 | Buffalo |
| 2002-03 | 105.4 | 117.6 | 111.3 | 135.2 | 153.2 | Syracuse |
| 2003-04 | 65.1 | 106.4 | 100.9 | 125.6 | 181.3 | Syracuse |
| 2004-05 | 75.9 | 106.5 | 109.1 | 113.6 | 136.2 | Syracuse |
| 2005-06 | 30.2 | 74.9 | 78.2 | 73.9 | 124.6 | Syracuse |
| 2006-07 | 45.9 | 78.6 | 88.9 | 107.2 | 140.2 | Syracuse |
| 2007-08 | 61.1 | 70.7 | 103.8 | 106.0 | 109.1 | Syracuse |
| 2008-09 | 52.6 | 73.3 | 100.2 | 103.7 | 149.6 | Syracuse |
| 2009-10 | 45.4 | 81.4 | 74.1 | 90.2 | 106.3 | Syracuse |
| Season | Albany | Binghamton | Buffalo | Rochester | Syracuse | City With Most Snow |
| 2010-11 | 87.2 | 117.5 | 111.8 | 127.0 | 179.0 | Syracuse |
| 2011-12 | 23.3 | 43.5 | 36.7 | 59.9 | 50.6 | Rochester |
| 2012-13 | 51.4 | 69.1 | 58.8 | 78.1 | 115.4 | Syracuse |
| 2013-14 | 73.5 | 85.4 | 129.9 | 112.7 | 132.0 | Syracuse |
| 2014-15 | 75.9 | 93.4 | 112.9 | 101.9 | 119.7 | Syracuse |
| 2015-16 | 16.9 | 32.0 | 55.1 | 63.7 | 80.3 | Syracuse |
| 2016-17 | 60.8 | 135.2 | 76.1 | 107.1 | 134.9 | Binghamton |
| 2017-18 | 77.3 | 90.6 | 112.3 | 120.5 | 153.6 | Syracuse |
| 2018-19 | 55.4 | 81.4 | 118.8 | 97.1 | 115.0 | Buffalo |
| 2019-20 | 49.7 | 79.1 | 69.2 | 91.8 | 87.6 | Rochester |
| 2020-21 | 54.6 | 105.0 | 77.2 | 69.6 | 73.3 | Binghamton |
| 2021-22 | 36.4 | 81.8 | 97.4 | 87.0 | 76.0 | Buffalo |
| 2022-23 | 55.0 | 61.5 | 133.6 | 50.4 | 65.6 | Buffalo |
| 2023-24 | 31.8 | 47.8 | 71.3 | 52.5 | 60.8 | Buffalo |
| 2024-25 | 43.9 | 80.1 | 77.3 | 88.3 | 115.4 | Syracuse |
| 2025-26 | 58.4 | 75.8 | 92.5 | 114.1 | 143.1 | Syracuse |

Snowiest Season for all Golden Snowball Cities: Buffalo 199.4 inches (1976-77)

Least Snowiest Season for all Golden Snowball Cities: Albany 13.8 inches (1912-13)

== Max, min, and average snowfall by city ==
=== Albany ===
Max: 112.5 inches (1970-71)

Min: 13.8 inches (1912-13)

Average: 59.2 inches

=== Binghamton ===
Max: 135.2 inches (2016-17)

Min: 32.0 inches (2015-16)

Average: 86.5 inches

=== Buffalo ===
Max: 199.4 inches (1976-77) (Note: This is due to the Blizzard of 77.)

Min: 36.7 inches (2011-12)

Average: 95.4 inches

=== Rochester ===
Max: 161.7 inches (1959-60)

Min: 41.7 inches (1952-53)

Average: 102.0 inches

=== Syracuse ===
Max: 192.1 inches (1992-93)

Min: 50.6 inches (2011-12)

Average: 127.8 inches
