= Mitchell P. Nowakowski =

American politician

Mitchell Nowakowski
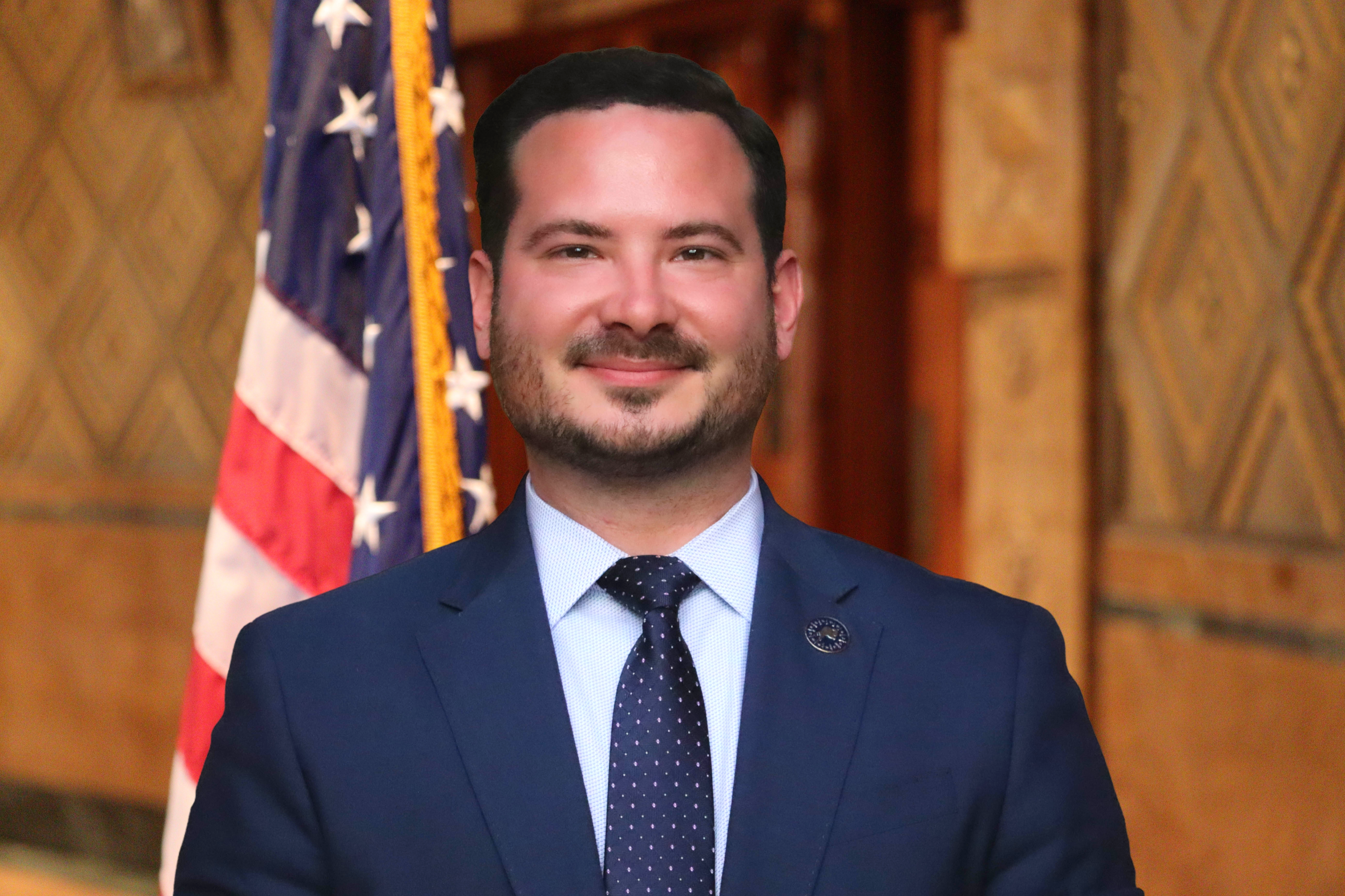

Member of the Buffalo Common Council from the Fillmore district

Mitchell Nowakowski is a council member of the Buffalo Common Council of Buffalo, New York, representing Buffalo's Fillmore Councilmatic District.

The Fillmore District is a diverse district that encompasses several City of Buffalo planning neighborhoods, such as: the Broadway-Fillmore neighborhood, Allentown, the Old First Ward, the Lower West Side, Downtown Buffalo, the Waterfront, Canalside, Gennese-Moselle, and the Cobblestone District. Before running for the Buffalo Common Council, Mitch Nowakowski worked in the Central Staff of the Council, and built relationships with Buffalo Police and various city hall departments.

Council Member Nowakowski serves as the Buffalo Common Council's Finance Chair, working to optimize the efficiency of the city's finances.

== Political career ==
During his tenure on the Common Council, Nowakowski has focused on issues related to housing, historic preservation, and fiscal accountability. He has advocated for stronger oversight of vacant and abandoned properties, supported stabilization efforts for historic buildings, and promoted adaptive reuse projects in neighborhoods including Broadway-Fillmore, Cobblestone, and Downtown Buffalo.
