= Representative assembly =

Official body for popular representation

A representative assembly is a political institution in which a number of persons representing the population or privileged orders within the population of a state come together to debate, negotiate with the executive (originally the king or other ruler) and legislate. Examples in English-speaking countries are the United States Congress and the Parliament of the United Kingdom.

== History ==
The classical republics of Greece, Rome and Carthage included citizen assemblies (e.g. the Roman comitia). Popular assemblies (things) also emerged in pre-civilised Germanic and Scandinavian lands (and the modern assemblies in those countries are often named after the originals). However, all of these were direct rather than indirect expressions of democracy, since their members were the people themselves rather than representatives of the people. The idea of an assembly of representatives, a representative assembly, as a political institution of a literate society first appeared in Europe in the Middle Ages, more specifically in the twelfth to fifteenth centuries. It may have been brought into being by rulers determined to avoid being overawed by their powerful warrior barons by appealing to lower ranks of society: lesser landowners, townsmen and clergy. It may be the most important political innovation of the European Middle Ages.

The idea appeared first in Spain, then in England, France and Italy, then spread to Germany and Scandinavia, even Poland and Hungary. Various names were used for these institutions: in England, Ireland, Scotland, Sicily, the Papal States and the Kingdom of Naples they were called parliaments or parlamenti; in the Iberian peninsula they were called cortes or corts; in France they were called estates-general and in the Low Countries the estates- or states-general; in Germany the term used was landtag; in Denmark and Norway it was rigsdag, in Sweden riksdag, and in Poland sejm.

The number of chambers roughly corresponded to the organised orders or estates of mediaeval society: typically the church, the nobility, and the rest of society. Sometimes however (as in Spain and Portugal) the gentry or lesser nobility formed a separate order; sometimes (as in Sweden) the richer peasantry did likewise. The English parliament, which was to be an important example, was a deviant case in that only two orders were represented: the nobility and the rest.

The representative assembly fell into disuse in many of the more important states of Europe in the seventeenth century. However, it survived in England, Sweden, Poland, Hungary and many of the German statelets, the southern ones particularly. In the eighteenth century, the English parliament was effectively transplanted to the United States, and in the nineteenth century it evolved there in an increasingly democratic direction. The American variant propagated in due course to Latin America, but meanwhile in Europe there was a general revival of the representative assembly based principally on the English model. France revived its Estates General in the wake of its revolution. Later, after the disintegration of the empire of Napoleon Bonaparte, assemblies re-emerged in Sweden, the Netherlands, France and Spain. The British Empire especially at the time of its dismantlement in the twentieth century was instrumental in spreading parliamentary democracy far and wide, and in modern times the immense international influence of the United States has encouraged the spread of representative democracy worldwide.

Where forms of representative democracy have spread to countries that already had a tradition of assemblies, a merger of ideas has often taken place and the traditional name has tended to be used. Examples include majlis in certain Muslim countries, jirga in Afghanistan, duma in Russia. See list of national legislatures for more examples.

=== The first instance: the councils of León and Galicia ===
In Galicia in 1113, Bishop Diego II of Santiago de Compostela ordered a monthly convening of councils in the regions of his bishopric “as it was the custom of our ancestors”, bringing together churchmen, knights ('milites') and peasants to do justice, in what has been interpreted as a continuation of old Celtic or Suevi local traditions. Later, in 1188, King Ferdinand II of León and Galicia called for a general council of his kingdoms to meet in the capital, León, bringing together bishops, nobility and – allegedly for the first time in European history – representatives of the major cities and towns.

== State of the art ==
In more modern times, the supremacy of the lower chamber became normal, so did the organisation of representatives into competing parties, so did election and an extended franchise, so did the idea that the ministers of the executive should be responsible to it.

== See also ==
- National Assembly
- Deliberative assembly
- Legislative Assembly
- Legislature
- Diet (assembly)
