= Marc A. Coppola =

American politician

Member of the New York Senate from the 60th district
- In office February 28, 2006 – December 31, 2006
- Preceded by: Byron Brown
- Succeeded by: Antoine M. Thompson

Member of the Buffalo Common Council from the Delaware district
- In office 2000–2006
- Preceded by: Al Coppola
- Succeeded by: Michael LoCurto

Personal details
- Born: June 16, 1968 (age 58)
- Party: Democratic

Marc A. Coppola (born June 16, 1968) is a resident of the Town of Tonawanda, New York and a former member of the New York State Senate, where he represented the New York State Senate's 60th district, which included parts of the Cities of Buffalo and Tonawanda, the City of Niagara Falls and the Town of Grand Island.

Coppola graduated from Lafayette High School in Buffalo, New York. He holds a New York state real estate license and is a first class stationary engineer.

He began his political career by serving six years as the Delaware District Councilmember for the City of Buffalo. From 2004 to 2006 he was the Majority Leader of the Common Council. He succeeded his cousin, Al Coppola, in the Council seat.

In a February 2006 special election for the State Senate's 60th District, the Democratic Committees in Erie and Niagara Counties selected Coppola as their nominee over Buffalo Councilman Antoine Thompson. Coppola resigned the Council seat after being elected to the 60th District Senate seat.

While in the State Senate, Coppola served as the Ranking Minority Member of the Senate Cities Committee. This committee oversees legislation and policies relating to urban development and New York State's 62 cities. He also served on the Aging Committee, Commerce, Economic Development and Small Business Committee, Higher Education Committee, Labor Committee, and Tourism, Recreation and Sports Development Committee.

Thompson subsequently challenged and defeated Coppola in the September 2006 primary for a full two-year term in the Senate. At the urging of Mayor Byron Brown and Thompson, former State Sen. Al Coppola also challenged for the seat in the 2006 primary. Thompson defeated Marc Coppola again in the 2006 general election where Coppola ran as an Independent.

Coppola also ran in the 2010 general election as a Democrat, against Republican candidate Mike Ranzenhofer, for the New York 61st Senate District, obtaining about 37% of the votes.

== Election results ==
- February 2006 special election, NYS Senate, 60th SD

Marc A. Coppola (DEM - IND)	...	8,251
Christopher L. Jacobs (REP - CON)	...	6,321

- November 2006 general election, NYS Senate, 60th SD

Antoine M. Thompson (DEM - WOR)	...	37,623
Marc A. Coppola (IND)	...	14,528

- November 2010 general election, NYS Senate, 61st SD

Michael H. Ranzenhofer (REP - IND - CON)	...	63,467
Marc A. Coppola (DEM)	...	37,464

Political offices
Preceded by Al Coppola	Buffalo, New York Delaware District Councilman; 2000–2006	Succeeded by Michael LoCurto
Preceded by Rosemarie LoTempio	Buffalo, New York Buffalo Common Council Majority Leader; 2004–2006	Succeeded by Dominic J. Bonifacio Jr.
Preceded by Byron Brown	Ranking Minority Member of the New York State Senate Cities Committee; 2006	Succeeded by Antoine M. Thompson
New York State Senate
Preceded by Byron Brown	New York State Senate, 60th District; 2006	Succeeded by Antoine Thompson
