= Alfred Coppola =

American politician

Member of the New York Senate from the 57th district
- In office February 2000 – December 2000
- Governor: George Pataki
- Preceded by: Anthony Nanula
- Succeeded by: Byron Brown

Buffalo Common Council
- In office 1984 – 2000
- Constituency: Delaware District

Personal details
- Born: January 11, 1942 (age 84) Buffalo, New York, U.S.
- Party: Democratic
- Other political affiliations: Independence Party of New York; Conservative Party of New York State
- Spouse: Carol Grabski (m. 1966)
- Children: 3

Alfred "Al" Coppola (born January 11, 1942) is an American politician who served as a state senator in New York. A resident of Buffalo, New York, Coppola is a long time political figure in the city, who served briefly as the 57th District member in the New York Senate at the turn of the 21st century.

== Political career ==
A longtime member of the Buffalo Common Council, representing the city's Delaware District, Coppola was nominated by Democratic Party leaders in Erie and Niagara Counties in a February 2000 special election to fill a vacancy in the State Senate. The vacancy was created after State Senator Anthony Nanula resigned to become Buffalo City Comptroller. Coppola defeated Niagara County Legislator Renae Kimble, a Democrat running on the Republican line, to win the Senate seat. As a senator, Coppola represented parts of Buffalo and Tonawanda and all of Niagara Falls and Grand Island. He focused much of his legislative program on energy issues during his tenure in Albany.

Coppola lost the September 2000 primary for a full two-year second term in the Senate to City of Buffalo Councilmember Byron Brown. Coppola continued his reelection campaign into the general election as the nominee of the Conservative and Independence Parties. He lost to Brown, but did finish ahead of Republican nominee Bob Woolworth.

Coppola unsuccessfully challenged Brown in the 2002 and 2004 Democratic primaries for the Senate seat which in 2002 was renamed the 60th district and as the Republican nominee in the general election those years. In 2005 he made a short-lived bid for the Democratic nomination for Mayor of Buffalo, a nomination which eventually went to Brown. After Brown resigned the Senate seat to become mayor, Coppola briefly pursued the Democratic nomination to run in the special election. This nomination went to his cousin, Marc Coppola, who had succeeded him as council member.

Al Coppola challenged his cousin, Senator Marc Coppola and Antoine Thompson, who had been endorsed by Brown in the 2006 Democratic primary for the Senate seat. The race was won by Antoine Thompson.

In 2008 Thompson was successful against Buffalo attorney Mark J. Grisanti who ran against him in the Democratic primary. He was unopposed in that year's general election. In 2010 Thompson won the 2010 Democratic primary with 56% of the vote against challengers Al Coppola and local businessman Rory Allen.

Coppola ran for the office again in the September 13, 2012 primary election against endorsed Democrat Michael L. Amodeo and Charles Swanick, a former member of the Erie County legislature. Amodeo won the election, Coppola came in third.

Coppola ran for this seat in the Democratic primary on September 9, 2014 against Marc Panepinto while incumbent Mark Grisanti faced Kevin T. Stocker in the Republican primary. Timothy D. Gallagher is running on the Conservative Party ticket. Panepinto won the nomination.

New York State Senate
Preceded by Anthony Nanula	New York State Senate, 57th District; 2000	Succeeded by Byron Brown
