= Byron Brown =

American politician (born 1958)

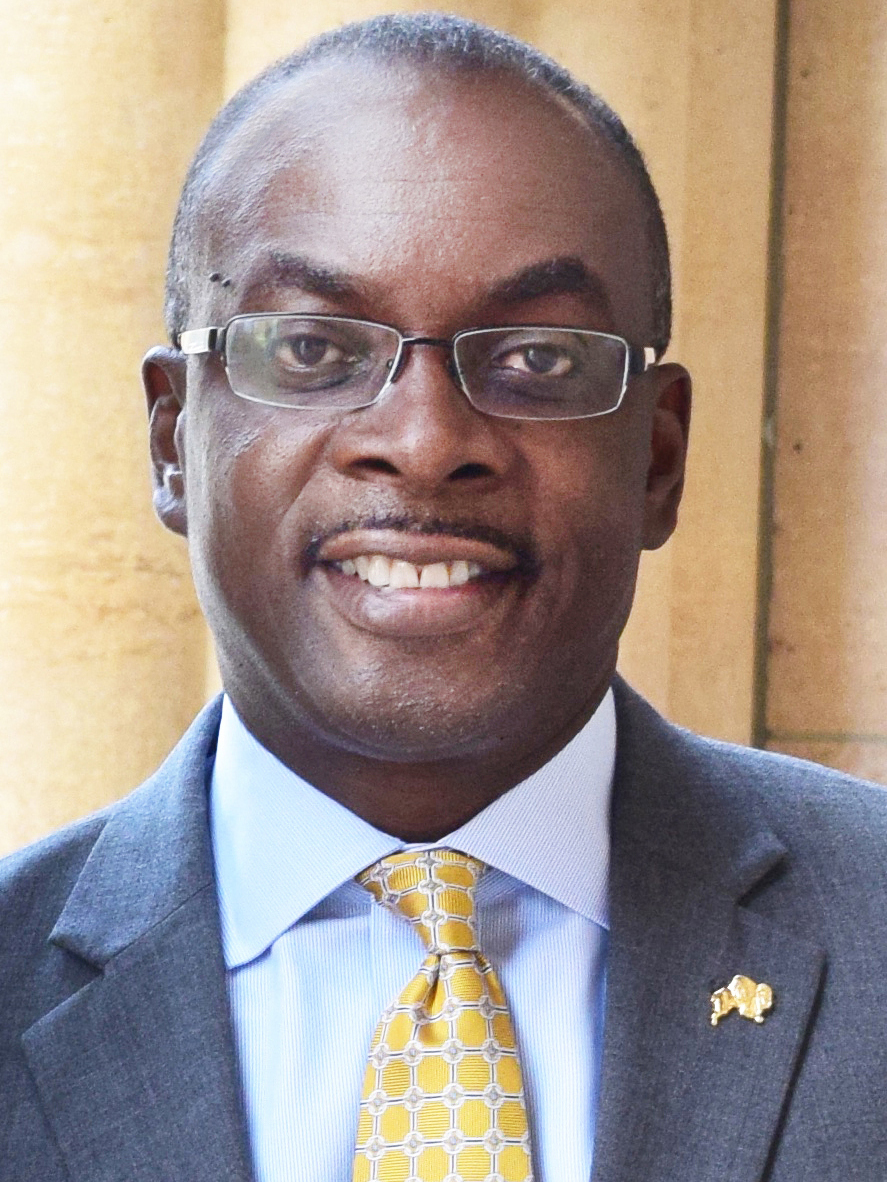
- Brown in 2016

Chair of the New York Democratic Party
- In office May 23, 2016 – January 14, 2019
- Preceded by: Sheila Comar
- Succeeded by: Jay Jacobs

62nd Mayor of Buffalo
- In office January 1, 2006 – October 15, 2024
- Preceded by: Anthony Masiello
- Succeeded by: Christopher Scanlon (acting)

Member of the New York Senate
- In office January 8, 2001 – December 31, 2005
- Preceded by: Al Coppola
- Succeeded by: Marc A. Coppola
- Constituency: 57th district (2001-2002); 60th district (2003-2005)

Member of the Buffalo Common Council from the Masten district
- In office January 1, 1996 – January 1, 2001
- Preceded by: David Collins
- Succeeded by: Antoine Thompson

Personal details
- Born: Byron William Brown; September 24, 1958 (age 68) New York City, New York, U.S.
- Party: Democratic (1995–present); Buffalo Party (2021)
- Spouse: Michelle Austin
- Children: 1
- Education: Buffalo State College (BA)

Byron William Brown II (born September 24, 1958) is an American politician who served as the 62nd mayor of Buffalo, New York from 2006 until his resignation in 2024. He was the city's first African-American mayor and the longest-serving mayor. He previously served as a member of the New York State Senate and the Buffalo Common Council.

Brown was born and raised in Queens, New York, and rose to office after serving in a variety of political roles. He began as an aide to local representatives the Buffalo Common Council, Erie County Legislature and New York State Assembly and was appointed to the Erie County cabinet-level Director of Equal Employment Opportunity post.

In 2001, Brown became the first African-American politician elected to the New York State Senate to represent a district outside New York City and the first minority to represent a majority-white New York State Senate district.

He was elected Mayor of Buffalo in 2006 and was repeatedly re-elected. In 2021, he lost the Democratic primary to challenger India Walton, but defeated her in the general election as a write-in candidate. He later announced in a September 2024 press conference that he would resign as mayor of Buffalo sometime in October. Brown's resignation took effect on October 15, 2024, with Christopher Scanlon serving as acting mayor until the next mayoral election in 2025.

== Early life and education ==
Brown was raised in Hollis in a duplex his family shared with his grandparents, who were immigrants from the Caribbean island of Montserrat. He grew up on 200th Street between 100th and 104th Avenues and has several relatives still in the area. As a Queens resident, he was a New York Mets and New York Knicks fan.

Brown was a Boy Scout at Hollis Presbyterian Church in Queens and was also active in the Central Queens YMCA (now called Jamaica YMCA). Brown attended Public School 134 in Hollis, junior high school PS 109, and August Martin High School, where he played the trumpet in the high school band. Brown and his sister, Andrea, were the first generation in his family to attend college.

After graduating from August Martin High School, Brown attended Buffalo State College. He played a year of Junior Varsity basketball as a 5-foot-11-inch (1.80 m) guard. While he had considered a potential medical career, Brown graduated in 1983 with a dual Bachelor of Arts in political science and journalism. He subsequently completed a certificate program for senior executives in state and local government at Harvard University's John F. Kennedy School of Government.

== Early career ==
After college, Brown worked for Bristol-Myers for a year as a regional sales representative. Brown quit after a short tenure and took the New York State Troopers exam before becoming Chief of staff for Buffalo Common Council President George Arthur for two years. He then spent two years as an aide to Erie County Legislator Roger Blackwell (later Erie County Legislature Chairman). Then, he worked for two years under Arthur Eve, the Deputy Speaker of the New York State Assembly. Subsequently, he served eight years as director of the Erie County division of the Equal Employment Opportunity Commission under Erie County Executive Dennis Gorski. He resigned his directorship in July 1993 to run for public office.

During his early career, Brown also became a member of Grassroots, a political organization that was founded in 1986 by a group of block club leaders. Brown eventually served as a vice president of the organization.

Brown was recognized in the November 1989 issue of Ebony magazine as one of the "30 Leaders of the Future" with a caption that read "Byron Brown chosen for leadership skills." The Buffalo Chapter of the Southern Christian Leadership Conference in 1991 honored him with the Martin Luther King Jr. Award for community service. In 1993 he was selected by Business First for its "40 Under Forty Honor Roll". He was awarded the Infinity Broadcasting/WBLK 2001 "Voice of Power Award" and the 2004 "Citizen of the Year" award. He also received the "Political Impact Award" from the Alpha Kappa Alpha sorority in 2001.

In 1992, Brown was a delegate to the 1992 Democratic National Convention from the New York's 33rd congressional district. His vote was originally pledged to Bob Kerrey for the Democratic presidential nomination, but Brown transferred his support to then-Governor Bill Clinton after Kerrey bowed out of the 1992 Democratic Primary campaign on March 5, 1992. In 1993, Brown was invited to attend Bill Clinton's Presidential Inauguration.

== Early elective experience ==
In his first attempt at public office in 1993, Brown ran for the third district of the Erie County Legislature against incumbent William Robinson and George "Butch" Holt, who had Eve's endorsement. Robinson earned the Democratic Party endorsement in June 1993, with the help of Holt who voted for Robinson instead of himself. In June, Brown was notified that he must resign his Erie County cabinet-level post in order to run for public office and he did so in July. Holt won the Democratic nomination with a 267-vote 40–37% margin over Brown in the September 14, 1993 primary election.

Brown won the September 1995 Democratic primary for the Masten District Buffalo Common Council seat. He then took time out from campaigning to attend the October 16, 1995 Million Man March. Brown ousted 18-year veteran council member, David Collins, to win his seat on the Buffalo Common Council. He beat Collins by a 5,391–1,670 (76–24%) margin in the November 7, 1995 general election. In his 1997 re-election campaign, he won the September 9 Democratic primary handily, and he was unopposed in the November 4 general election. In his 1999 re-election campaign, he again won the Democratic primary easily on September 14, and he won the November 2 general election. Beginning in January 2000, Brown served as part of the first ever African-American majority in the history of the Buffalo Common Council.

In 1996, The Buffalo News described Brown as "Buffalo's Julian Bond". While on the council, the future state senator and mayor was called "bright, creative and hardworking" in a 1999 Buffalo News survey.

== State Senate ==
In 2000, he competed for the Democratic nomination for the New York State Senate 57th District against incumbent Al Coppola and Samuel A. Herbert. Coppola was endorsed by Buffalo Mayor Anthony Masiello. Brown won the September 2000 primary by a wide 18% margin. However, Coppola remained on the ballot in the general election on the Conservative Party of New York, Working Families Party and Green Party lines. The Republican Party nominee was the politically inexperienced Harrison R. Woolworth. Although Brown began the race without organized political support, he earned endorsements from many veteran non-Western New York politicians such as H. Carl McCall, Andrew Cuomo, and Hillary Clinton.

When he was sworn into the State Senate on January 1, 2001, Brown became New York's first African-American State Senator elected outside of New York City. He also became the first minority member of the New York State Senate to represent a majority-white district.

During Brown's tenure in the New York State Senate, the Democratic Party was in the minority. Brown was part of the majority that backed New York Governor George Pataki's 2001 plan to build up to three Western New York casinos on Seneca Indian land. The legislation was controversial because it granted slot machine rights to casino operators for the first time in New York State. Both of the previous casinos used video gambling machines with debit cards. Brown supported the casinos as a way to support the local economy. When the casino was completed in 2003, he was on the seven-member commission that was to apportion the state's agreed 18% share of the slot machine revenue, amounting to approximately $40 million.

By spring of 2003, Brown was a rising star in the declining years of the "Harlem Clubhouse", a loose political fraternity of David Dinkins, Charles Rangel, Basil Paterson, Percy Sutton and sometimes H. Carl McCall that had dominated state politics while forging the careers of its members for much of the late 20th century. He was envisioned as a front-runner for the 2006 Democratic nomination as Lieutenant Governor of New York or as Buffalo's first black mayor. By 2004 it seemed clear that he was eyeing the mayor's office. In the 2004 New York State Senate elections, Republican nominee Al Coppola opposed Brown for the redistricted 60th District and garnered only 23% of the vote.

== Mayoralty ==
In February 2005, Brown announced his candidacy for Mayor of Buffalo. On April 29, 2005, three-term Democratic Mayor Anthony Masiello announced he would not seek a fourth four-year term. Masiello had run on both major party lines for his final two terms and had twice endorsed Republican Governor George Pataki. During his tenure, the city population and industrial tax base had decreased. Six candidates, including Brown, entered the race to replace him, with Brown accumulating many endorsements and the backing of organized labor.

New York Attorney General Eliot Spitzer described helping Brown win the Mayoral race as his "biggest campaign priority" in the last month and a half before Primary Day. Buffalo, which had an 8:1 Democrat to Republican ratio and a 38% black population, was 75% contained in Brown's State Senate district. Brown carried 59% of the vote in the September 13, 2005, Democratic primary. He then went on to face Kevin Helfer, a former City Council colleague, in the general election. Brown was the sixth African-American to win the Democratic Mayor Primary since the 1960s, but all before him had failed to win the general election, even though the city had not elected a Republican since 1961. His Republican opponent, Helfer, beat him in the Conservative Party Primary as a write-in candidate, although Brown had been endorsed by that party. Brown raised more than five times as much money as Helfer, however, and defeated him 64% to 27% in the general election.

=== First term ===
==== Economic development ====
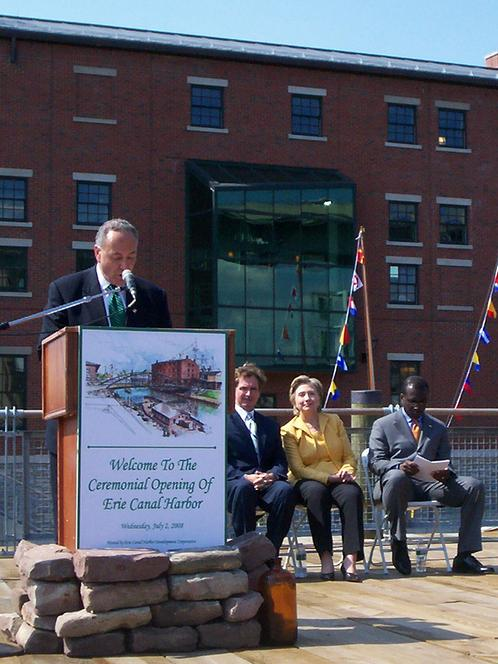
Brown sits next to Sen. Hillary Clinton and Rep. Brian Higgins while Sen. Charles Schumer speaks at Erie Canal Harbor opening ceremony on July 2, 2008.

Brown was sworn in on December 31, 2005, at the Buffalo Niagara Convention Center. During his first day in office he toured the Buffalo Waterfront to show his commitment to its development. Before the end of the year, restoration on the original point where the Erie Canal met the Great Lakes was underway. Brown presented his plans for the development during subsequent tours by top state leaders, including future New York State Governors Eliot Spitzer and David Paterson. Erie Canal Harbor eventually opened on July 2, 2008.

In early 2006, the Seneca Nation filed with the Securities and Exchange Commission to build the third of the three Western New York casinos that had been legislated in 2002. In 2007, Brown was not sure he was in favor of the third casino, which seemed to cater to local residents instead of luring tourist revenues. Tom Golisano, founder of Paychex, former owner of the Buffalo Sabres National Hockey League franchise and three-time candidate for New York State Governor, suggested that the Buffalo economy would not benefit from a business designed to transfer money from local citizens to the Seneca Gaming Corporation. Brown withheld support while awaiting clarification of the target consumer for the third casino. In October 2006, the Seneca Nation and Brown came to terms on the final sale of a two-block stretch of city road that runs amid the 9-acre (36,000 m^{2}) construction site. As part of the sale the nation agreed to both marketing terms (regarding marketing beyond the local region), and hiring preferences for city residents. However, in January 2007, a federal judge ruled that the granting of permission to run the third casino by the National Indian Gaming Commission was improper. Seneca Nation received federal approval for their casino on July 2, 2007, and opened the following day.

==== Crime and poverty ====
Brown was one of the original 15 mayors from United States cities such as Washington, Dallas, Philadelphia, Seattle and Milwaukee who convened at a meeting hosted by Michael Bloomberg and Thomas Menino at Gracie Mansion to confirm their support for more serious attacks on the use of illegal firearms. Bloomberg and Philip A. Amicone, the mayor of Yonkers, were the only Republicans. The mayors all signed a six-point "statement of principles" focused on punishing gun possession "to the maximum extent of the law", prosecuting dealers who knowingly sell guns to criminals through so-called straw purchasers, opposing two United States House of Representatives bills to restrict cities' access to gun-tracing data, endorsing technologies to detect illegal guns, and coordinating strategies and outreach to other cities in hopes of reconvening with at least 50 mayors by year end. A little over a year later the Mayors Against Illegal Guns Coalition co-chaired by Bloomberg and Menino included 225 bi-partisan municipal leaders in pursuit of legal, political and media strategies to stem gun crime and had a stated goal of "making the public safer by getting illegal guns off the streets". Brown noted that he learned several techniques that became useful in Buffalo in reducing the homicide rate 21% from the coalition and talks with specific mayors. Rising homicides had been a disappointment in his first year as mayor.

Brown's first-year review as a mayor was mixed. He was praised for his overhaul of city hall, his follow through on projects and systems, and his influence on statewide redistribution, but he was dogged by crime issues and his efforts for the planned casino. His agenda, hiring and discipline were respected, but rising homicides, continuing decay and evolving bureaucracy were troubling. In addition to public perceptions, Brown had a good working relationship with the Buffalo Common Council.

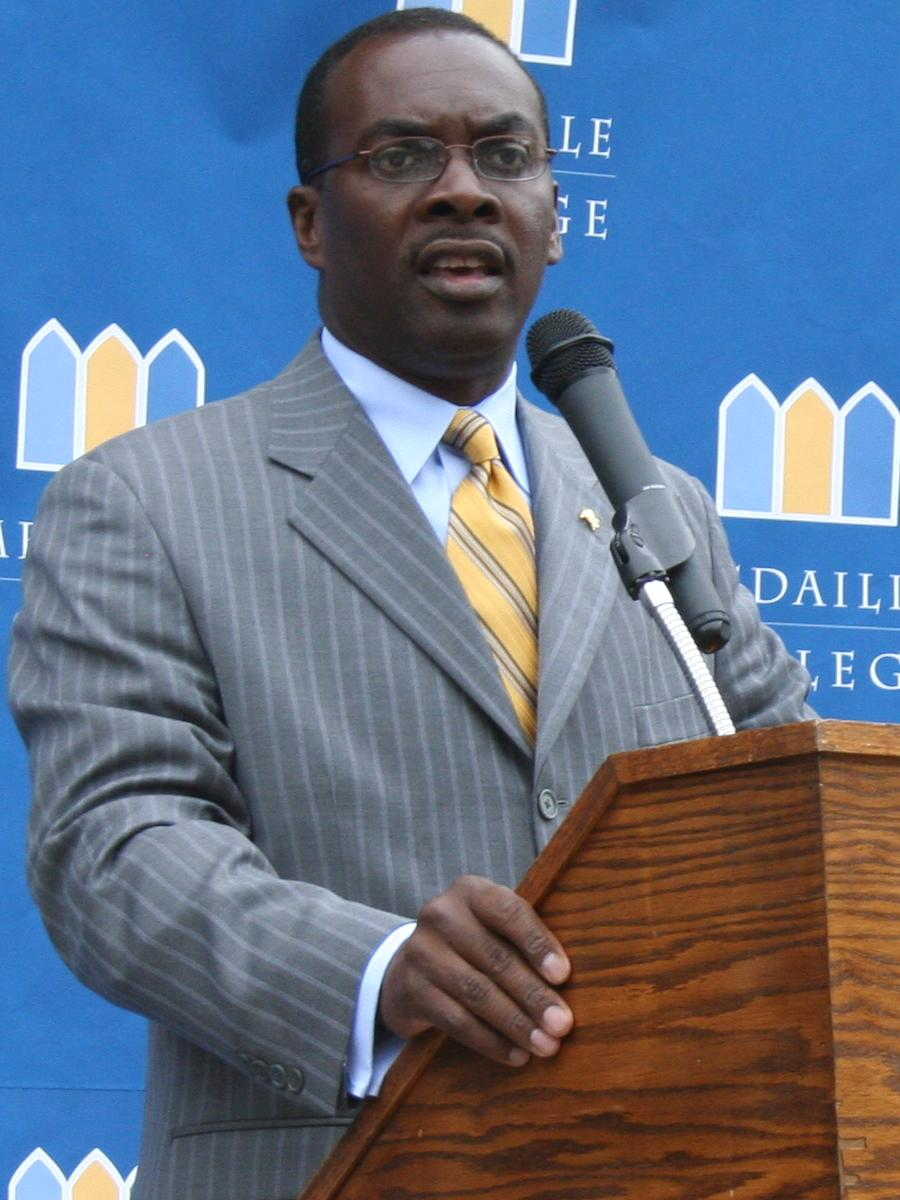
Brown spoke in September 2008 at Medaille College.

As mayor of Buffalo, he presided over emergency relief from blizzards such as the mid-October 2006 two-foot snow storm. The storm more than doubled the previous record for single-day October snowfall. Despite the fact that about 200,000 city residents were without electricity, the city saw no spike in criminal activity, according to Brown.

Buffalo is second only to St. Louis among cities nationwide in terms of percentage of vacant properties per capita. Therefore, in fall 2007, Brown committed to a $100 million five-year plan to demolish 5,000 houses, which is about half of the city's total of vacant houses. However, since Buffalo has the second highest residential poverty rate (to Detroit) homes continue to be abandoned. The program may benefit the city because abandoned house costs it an approximate average of $20,060 over five years in lost taxes, debris removal, inspections, and policing. Also, 41% of all fires in Buffalo are in vacant buildings, and more than 90% of all arson cases involved abandoned houses. Subsequently, during the first ever "State of Upstate Address", New York Governor Spitzer suggested committing $100 million in state funds to build or rehabilitate 10,000 homes and apartments. The mayor's initial demolition plans met with resistance from preservationists and he had to negotiate with the National Trust for Historic Preservation, which got him attention from coast to coast.

In 2008, Brown convinced Buffalo to use a real-time wireless video surveillance system. The city installed 56 Avrio Rapid Deployment Surveillance Solution PoleCams. The system was the result of a request by Brown that the city evaluate surveillance cameras in other cities. By January 2009 State of the City Address, Brown reported that crime had fallen 12% and homicide by 50% since he had taken office.

==== Public relations ====
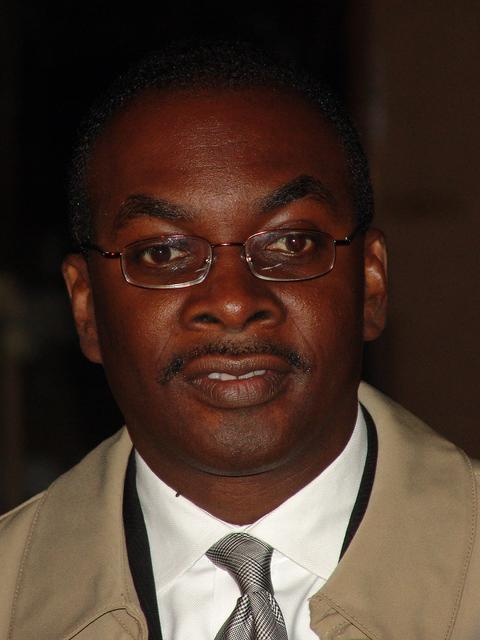
Brown in 2008

On June 13, 2008, upon the death of NBC News Washington Bureau Chief and Meet the Press moderator Tim Russert, who was a proud Buffalo native, Brown ordered that all flags on city property be lowered to half-staff in order to honor Russert's memory. Brown called Russert one of Buffalo's finest ambassadors, and his decision to lower the flags in honor of Russert, a civilian who never held elected office, was an unusual gesture that was described as breathtaking on Hardball with Chris Matthews by Tom Brokaw. He was joined by several other officials in recognizing Russert. Chief among those was United States President George W. Bush who signed a bill that named a stretch of U.S. Route 20A that passes in front of Ralph Wilson Stadium (home stadium of the Buffalo Bills) Timothy J. Russert Highway.

In a public relations controversy, Brown got caught in a fight against the movement to replace traditional lawns with front yard gardens. His office had issued an edict that a resident remove her landscape renovations. However, an e-mail campaign in defense of the resident caused the mayor to rethink his stance.

In 2019 Buffalo won the Golden Snowball Award, an award presented annually to the Upstate New York city that had the largest snowfall the previous winter. Brown refused to claim the Golden Snowball Trophy from the mayor of the previous winner, Syracuse, because he "did not see the contest as 'a real contest'".

=== Second term ===
On September 15, 2009, Brown won the Democratic Primary for a second term by a nearly two to one margin over City council member Michael P. Kearns. Brown had amassed an early lead amongst voters until several scandals involving former basketball star Leonard Stokes, including the questionable government support of his failed "One Sunset" restaurant and a perceived undue influence in mitigating Stokes's arrest for possessing a stolen handicapped parking permit, cut away most of his lead. There were no Republican, third-party or independent candidates, so Brown ran unopposed and won the general election.

==== Political dealings ====
Brown and Erie County Democratic Committee chairman Leonard Lenihan were at odds over various political positions after Lenihan played a major role in Brown's election to the office of mayor. Brown supported Andrew Cuomo for New York Attorney General in the 2006 general election, David Paterson for Lieutenant Governor of New York in the 2006 general election and Antoine Thompson for 60th District New York Senator in a special election on February 28, 2006. Lenihan disagreed with each of these choices. Thompson had run Brown's last common council campaign, and Brown was upset that he did not get to select his successor in the 60th District. Many supporters considered boycotting the special election due to a perceived racial slight against an African American who seemed to be wrongfully shutout of the process. Lenihan pointed out that neither of the previous state senators turned mayor, Anthony Masiello and James D. Griffin, was granted the right to pick their successor, and he noted that Thompson had not been timely in entering the special election process. The Erie and Niagara County Democratic committees bypassed Thompson as their nominee in favor of Marc Coppola despite Brown's backing in the February special election. Thompson subsequently decided to run for the New York Senate seat in the November general election.

The week before the 2006 New York State Democratic Convention, Brown was described as a political confidant of Democratic New York Attorney General candidate Andrew Cuomo. He seconded Cuomo's nomination at the convention on May 30, 2006. Throughout the campaign Brown was described as a close political advisor to Cuomo. He was noted as (along with Charles Rangel) one of the important black political leaders that Cuomo courted on his road to victory.

During the 2008 United States presidential election, like most of the New York State Democratic establishment, Brown was a supporter of Hillary Clinton, the United States senator from New York. This marked a break from his earlier political organization, Grassroots, which supported Barack Obama from the outset. He even ran to be a delegate for Clinton at the 2008 Democratic National Convention. In July 2008, Golisano announced that he would attempt to create change in Albany by spending $5 million on targeted campaigns. During the New York state September primary elections for state office, The New York Times alleged that Brown was aiding Golisano's attempt to unseat Sam Hoyt in the New York State Assembly.

As Hillary Clinton resigned her United States Senate seat on January 21, 2009, to assume a position in the United States Cabinet under United States President Barack Obama, New York Governor David Paterson was required to appoint a temporary replacement until a special election in 2010 for the balance of her term. Some thought that the New York State Governor would appoint a minority senator such as Brown, Gregory W. Meeks, H. Carl McCall, William C. Thompson Jr., José E. Serrano or Nydia M. Velázquez. However, Andrew Cuomo was the front-runner for the seat and the next most likely candidates were Velázquez, Steve Israel, Nita Lowey and Meeks. Prominent women who were mentioned include Carolyn B. Maloney and Caroline Kennedy. The New York Times's Danny Hakim noted that Cuomo, Paterson and Brown were the three names most often mentioned prior to Paterson's ascension to the governor's office. Although these three were the favorites, Brown was considered an unknown outside of Western New York. Nonetheless, Brown's name was mentioned before Kennedy's and Cuomo's in a New York Times article paragraph about Paterson's final nomination decision thoughts. In fact, in at least one article in The New York Times on the subject, Brown was mentioned and Cuomo wasn't. When Paterson announced he had selected Blue Dog Democrat Kirsten Gillibrand, Brown was one of the few contenders to attend the event.

When Andrew Cuomo ran for governor during the 2010 New York gubernatorial election, Brown was mentioned in early 2010 as a possible Lieutenant Governor of New York candidate by numerous sources, including multiple journalists from The New York Times. Meanwhile, in early 2010, newly transplanted New Yorker Harold Ford Jr. considered challenging New York's junior United States senator, Kirsten E. Gillibrand, in the 2010 United States Senate special election in New York and met with Brown as part of his statewide political travels.

=== Third and fourth terms ===
Brown was elected to a third and fourth term, winning handily in both elections. Among some of his most notable actions during these terms include successfully lobbying for a replacement for the Exchange Street Amtrak station and announcing changes to the Buffalo Police Department following an incident between protesters and police during the George Floyd protests. He also oversaw a period of development after the passing of the Buffalo Billion program.

He was a close political ally of former New York Governor Andrew Cuomo.

In 2016, Brown spearheaded The Unified Development Ordinance, also known as the Buffalo Green Code, which eliminated minimum parking standards in the city's zoning regulations.

=== 2021 mayoral election ===
In 2021, Brown campaigned for an unprecedented fifth term, but was defeated in the Democratic primary on June 23, 2021, by India Walton. During the primary campaign, Brown refused to participate in debates. While initially low key in his fundraising efforts, he was supported by a number of wealthy donors late into his campaign.

After his defeat in the primary, Brown announced that he would run as a write-in candidate in the general election. Since the Erie County Democratic Committee has supported India Walton following her victory in the Democratic Party primary, Brown increasingly relied on support from local Republican officials and right-wing organizations which were opposed to Walton, including to assist with collecting signatures for a place on the general election ballot.

On August 17, 2021, Brown's campaign submitted approximately 3,000 signatures in order to appear on the ballot as an independent, with the party label "Buffalo Party." The Erie County Board of Elections initially ruled the petitions invalid, and Brown sued for ballot access. However, on September 16, 2021, state and federal courts ruled against Brown, meaning that he would not appear on the 2021 general election ballot and would instead continue his campaign as a write-in candidate.

During the November 2 general election, Brown was re-elected after winning 58.8% of the vote as a write-in candidate. Brown declared his surprise victory as "one of the greatest comeback stories in our history." Brown had focused his campaign on rejecting the supposed radical views of Walton while stressing his own moderate credentials. He stated his victory was "a rebuke of defund the police... a rebuke of socialism".

Brown received general election endorsements from U.S. Representative Tom Suozzi, Buffalo Common Council members Joseph Golombek, Christopher Scanlon, and Ulysees Wingo, former mayor of Buffalo Anthony Masiello, the editorial board of The Buffalo News, and the local, county, and state police unions.

=== Resignation ===
Brown held a press conference on September 30, 2024, where he announced his intention to resign from office in order to accept a job as president and CEO of Western Regional Off-Track Betting. His resignation took effect on October 15. Christopher Scanlon, the president of the Buffalo Common Council, served as acting mayor until Sean Ryan, elected in November 2025, was inaugurated on January 1, 2026.

== Personal life ==
Byron Brown is married to the former Michelle Austin and they have a son, Byron III, who is referred to as Byron Jr. by some accounts. Brown III enjoys basketball and has attended high-level youth basketball camps. He played for City Honors School. On the national level, he was an unheralded point guard in the 2008 high school graduating class, and he went on to attend Queen City Prep in Charlotte, North Carolina.

The Brown family attends St. John Baptist Church. While mayor, Brown has performed at least one wedding ceremony at the church. Byron Brown is a chapter president of Alpha Phi Alpha fraternity, a past President of the Buffalo State College Alumni Association Board, and at the time of his mayoral inauguration he sat on the Board of the Boy Scout Council of Western New York and the Community Action Organization of Erie County. Brown collects tropical fish and maintained an aquarium in his Buffalo Mayor's office. His parents divorced and at the beginning of his mayoral tenure, his mother was living in Buffalo. He also is a member of the Erie County Democratic Committee. He was a delegate to the 1992, 2000 and 2004 Democratic National Conventions.

== Controversy ==
On May 2, 2008, Brown made use of the Buffalo Police Department, police from neighboring suburbs, the S.W.A.T team, Erie County Sheriff's department (with officers' guns strapped to their thighs), CBRNE (Chemical, Biological, Radiological, Nuclear, and Explosives) Unit armored vehicles, the K-9 unit, and a mobile command to police "Quad Party", a yearly, end-of-semester celebration held by students of Canisius College, which is situated in his neighborhood, prompting accusations of "overkill" in terms of law enforcement presence.

In August 2008, it was revealed that Brown condoned a Buffalo Police Department policy of illegally withholding crime reports from public knowledge.

== Electoral history ==
Year	Democrat	Votes	Pct	Opposition (1)	Votes	Pct	Opposition (2)	Votes	Pct	Opposition (3)	Votes	Pct
2000 NYSS 57th	Byron Brown	48,683	59.77%	Bob Woolworth	12,542	15.40%	Al Coppola	18,938	23.25%	Anthony Murty	1,285	1.58%
	Democratic	47,011		Republican	11,069		Conservative	13,501		Right to Life	1,285	
	Liberal	1,672		Independence	1,473		Green Party	3,385				
							Workers	2,052				
2002 NYSS 60th	Byron Brown	43,260	65.14%	Al Coppola	23,154	34.86%						
	Democratic	41,436		Republican	20,236							
	Liberal	1,824		Conservative	2,918							
2004 NYSS 60th	Byron Brown	75,031	77.07%	Al Coppola	22,328	22.93%						
	Democratic	65,609		Republican	22,328							
	Independence	3,736										
	Conservative	1,990										
	Working Families	3,696										
2005 Buffalo Mayor	Byron Brown	46,613	63.79%	Kevin Helfer	19,853	27.17%	Judith S. Einach	3,525	4.82%	Charles J. Flynn	3,082	4.22%
	Democratic	43,541		Republican	17,680		Green Party	3,525		Independence	3,082	
	Working Families	3,072		Conservative	2,173							
2009 Buffalo Mayor	Byron Brown	17,728	99.12%	Michael P. Kearns	158	0.88%						
	Democratic	15,567		Write-In	158							
	Independence	667										
	Conservative	643										
	Working Families	851										
2013 Buffalo Mayor	Byron Brown	26,120	70.87%	Sergio R. Rodriguez	10,733	29.12%						
	Democratic	23,881		Republican	9,390							
	Working Families	978		Progressive	1,343							
	Conservative	665										
	Independence	596										
2017 Mayor of Buffalo	Byron Brown	29,688	62.76%	Mark J F Schroeder	11,446	26.09%	Anita L. Howard	1,357	3.09%	Terrence A. Robinson	1,276	2.91%
	Democratic	27,532		Reform	11,446		Conservative	1,357		Green Party	1,276	
	Working Families	1,228										
	Independence	609										
	Women's Equality Party	319										

2021 Buffalo mayoral Democratic primary
Party	Candidate	Votes	%
Democratic	India Walton	11,132	51.85%
Democratic	Byron Brown (incumbent)	9,625	44.83%
Democratic	Le’Candice Durham	650	3.03%
Write-in		62	0.29%
Total votes		21,469	100.00%

=== 2021 Buffalo Mayoral general election ===
2021 Buffalo mayoral election
Party	Candidate	Votes	%
Independent	Byron Brown (write-in)	38,338	59.57
Democratic	India Walton	25,773	39.88
Independent	Ben Carlisle (write-in)	219	0.34
Republican	Jaz Miles (write-in)	23	0.04
Republican	William O'Dell (write-in)	8	0.01
Total votes		64,361	100%
Independent gain from Democratic			

== Notes ==
Political offices
Preceded by Anthony Masiello	Mayor of Buffalo; 2006–2024	Succeeded by Christopher Scanlon; Acting
Party political offices
Preceded by Sheila Comar	Chair of the New York Democratic Party; 2016–2019	Succeeded by Jay Jacobs
