= Buffalo Common Council =

Lawmaking body of Buffalo, New York, US

Type
- Type: Unicameral
- Term limits: None

History
- Founded: 1832

Leadership
- President of the Common Council: Joel P. Feroleto, (D) since October 15, 2024
- President Pro Tempore: Zeneta B. Everhart, (D)
- Majority Leader: Leah M. Halton-Pope, (D)

Structure
- Seats: 9
- Political groups: Democratic (8); Vacant (1)
- Length of term: 4 years
- Salary: $84,472

Elections
- Voting system: First-past-the-post
- Last election: November 7, 2023
- Next election: November 2027

Meeting place
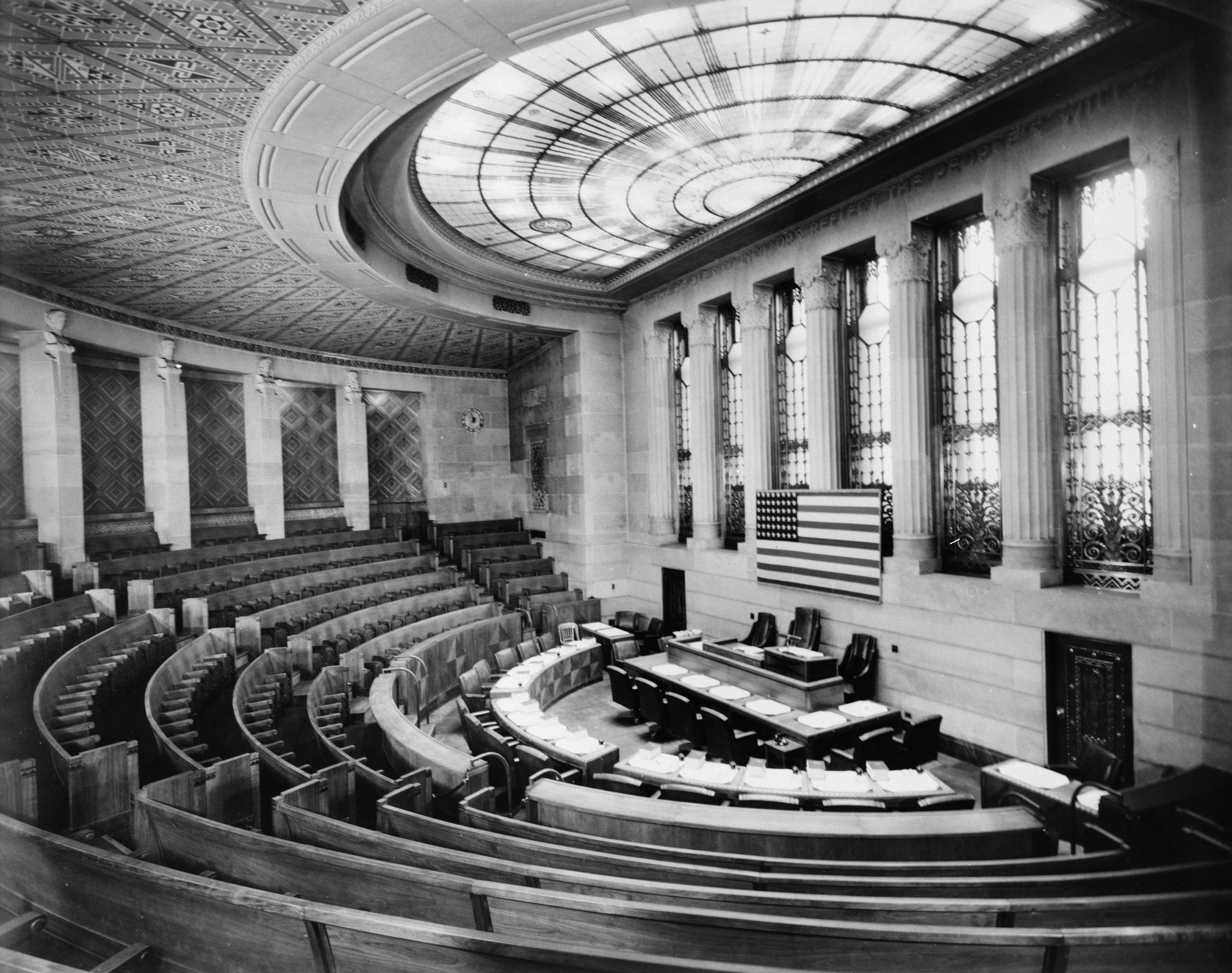
- Buffalo City Hall

Website
- Buffalo Common Council Website

The Buffalo Common Council is the lawmaking body of the city of Buffalo, New York, United States. It is a representative assembly, with one elected member from each of nine districts: Niagara, Delaware, Masten, Ellicott, Lovejoy, Fillmore, North, University, and South. In the past, the Common Council also had as many as five at-large members and a Council President who were elected citywide. Each council seat is elected for a four-year term, with elections occurring during off-years, between mid-term elections and presidential elections.

== History ==
From Buffalo's incorporation in 1832 the common council existed under New York State charters. In the early years of the common council the Buffalo Mayor, the head of the executive branch of the Buffalo government was also the president of the common council, head of the legislative branch. From 1832 to 1854 all mayors were also Common Council President. Eli Cook was the first mayor who did not serve as Common Council President for his whole term as mayor. From 1832–1913, no mayor served as Common Council President. In 1914, New York State charters established a council that consisted of five members – a mayor and four council members. From 1913 to 1927, the council was composed of the mayor, Commissioner of Finance and Accounts, Commissioner of Public Works, Commissioner of Parks and Public Buildings, Commissioner of Public Affairs, and the mayor was the chairman of the board. In 1926, the Kenefick Commission was appointed to form a new city charter after New York State authorized its cities to write their own charters in 1924. Since 1927, no Mayor has presided over the common council.

A 1983 downsizing eliminated two at-large members. A 2002 downsizing eliminated the remaining three at-large members and the elected Common Council President. The size of the council's membership has been shrinking roughly in tandem with the decrease in population.

== Composition ==
Affiliation	Party (shading shows control)		Total	
Affiliation	Democratic	Republican	Total	Vacant
End of previous legislature (2015)	9	0	9	0
Begin (2016)	9	0	9	0
End (2019)	9	0	9	0
Begin (2020)	9	0	9	0
End (2024)	8	0	8	1
Latest voting share	100.0%	0.0%		

== Members ==
The Democratic Party is the dominant party in Buffalo politics; no Republican or other party member has won a seat on the council in several decades, and all occupied seats are currently held by Democrats. As of January 2026, the current membership is as follows:

District Name	Member	Party	Tenure Began	Term Expires
Ellicott District	Leah M. Halton-Pope	Democratic	2024	2027
Lovejoy District	Bryan J. Bollman	Democratic	2019	2027
Fillmore District	Mitchell P. Nowakowski	Democratic	2019	2027
North District	Joseph Golombek Jr.	Democratic	1999	2027
South District	Christopher Scanlon	Democratic	2012	2027
Delaware District	Joel Feroleto	Democratic	2015	2027
Niagara District	David A. Rivera	Democratic	2007	2027
University District	Rasheed N.C. Wyatt	Democratic	2014	2027
Masten District	Zeneta B. Everhart	Democratic	2024	2027

According to the web site of the City of Buffalo, there is a Majority Leader and a Minority Leader if there are members from more than one political party. In practice, there is a majority leader even when all members of the council are from the same political party; a local law was passed in November 2002 to allow this. Mr. Christopher Scanlon was appointed by a majority of the Council on May 16, 2012, to fill the vacancy created when Michael P. Kearns won a seat on the New York State Assembly in a special election to fill a vacancy there. Mr. Scanlon secured his seat by winning in a subsequent general election. Scanlon was elevated to become acting Mayor of Buffalo through right of succession in October 2024. After his defeat in the June Primary Election, Scanlon returned to his seat as South District Council Member. The current Council President is Joel P. Feroleto. The term of all current Common Council members expires on December 31, 2027.

== Committees and Organizations ==
- Budget Committee
- Buffalo Urban Renewal Agency (BURA)
- Civil Service Committee
- Claims Committee
- Community Development Committee
- Education Committee
- Finance Committee
- Joint Schools Construction Board
- Legislative Committee
- Minority Business Enterprise (MBE) Committee
- Police Oversight
- Rules Committee
- Transportation Committee
- Water Front Committee
