= Steve Pigeon =

American political leader (born 1960)

G. Steven "Steve" Pigeon
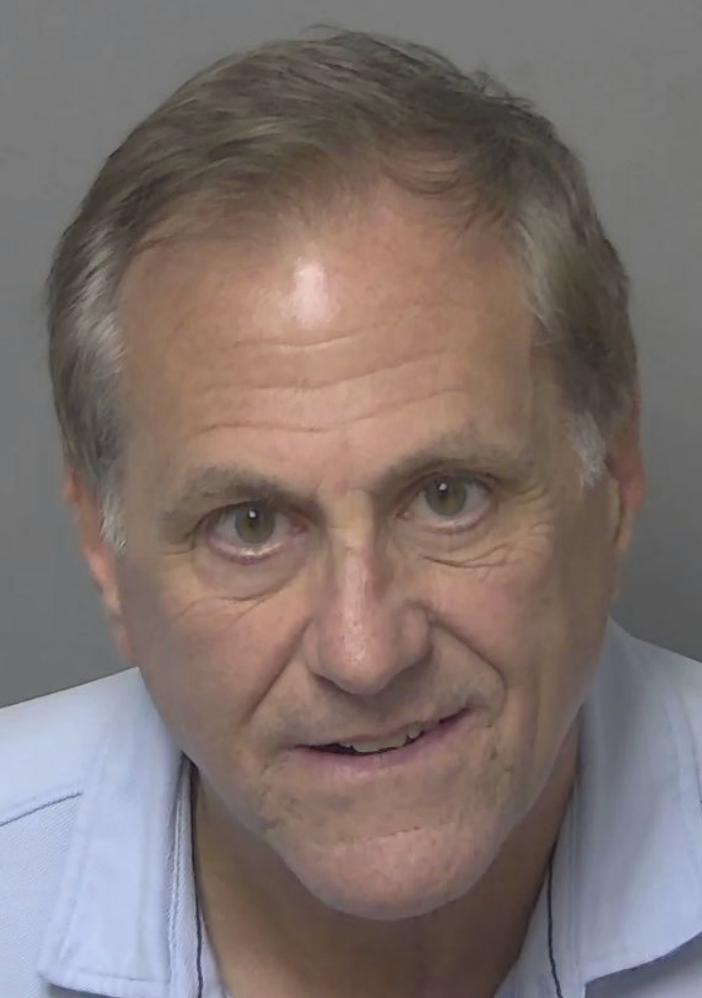
- Photo from the Florida Department of Law Enforcement

Chairman of the Erie County Democratic Committee
- In office 1996–2002
- Preceded by: James Sorrentino
- Succeeded by: Lenny Lenihan

Member of the Erie County Legislature from the 9th District
- In office 1987–1991
- Preceded by: Robert H. Meier
- Succeeded by: David M. Manz

Personal details
- Born: August 12, 1960 (age 66) St. Louis, Missouri
- Party: Democratic
- Education: SUNY Buffalo Law School
- Occupation: Consultant, Underberg & Kessler
- Known for: Western New York Democratic politician

Gerald Steven Pigeon (August 12, 1960), usually cited in newspaper accounts as Steve Pigeon, is a former Democratic politician from Western New York. Pigeon was Erie County Democratic Chairman from 1996 to 2002. He parlayed his clout to become an advisor to State Senator Pedro Espada Jr., Tom Golisano, and Clare Bronfman of NXIVM.

Pigeon pleaded guilty to one count of conspiracy to defraud the United States (18 U.S.C. § 371) in 2018, confessing to a scheme to illegally funnel money to the campaign account of Andrew Cuomo. He was given a four-month prison sentence.

Pigeon also pleaded guilty in New York State court to bribing John A. Michalek, a New York Supreme Court Judge, to obtain patronage jobs for relatives. Pigeon was sentenced to 1 year imprisonment, and allowed to serve his sentence concurrent to his federal imprisonment.

The Erie County District Attorney indicted Pigeon on charge of predatory sexual assault against a child in 2021. Pigeon initially denied the charges and pleaded not guilty at arraignment. On 22 December 2023, Pigeon pleaded guilty to the lesser charge of child sexual abuse and received a one-year sentence. A court hearing following his release labeled Pigeon a "sexually violent offender." As of December 2025 Pigeon is also listed as a sex offender by the Florida Department of Law Enforcement.

== Early life and career ==
Pigeon was born in 1960 in St. Louis, Missouri. Pigeon's father Gerald Pigeon, an air traffic controller, left and took the family moved to West Seneca in 1972. Politics surrounded Pigeon from an early age. His uncle was Donald J. Gralike, the majority leader of the Missouri State Senate.

Pigeon first worked for a campaign in 1972, stuffing envelopes for Vincent Graber, Member of the New York State Assembly representing West Seneca and the Buffalo suburbs. He then worked for James D. Griffin's successful campaign in the 1977 Buffalo mayoral election.

Griffin won in spite of not having a major party nomination by using the ballot line of the Conservative Party of New York State. The loss was viewed as a blow to the power of incumbent political boss, Erie County Democratic Committee Chairman Joseph F. Crangle.

=== Striking out on his own (1984–1994) ===
Aged only 24, Pigeon managed Gary Hart's 1984 Democratic Party presidential primary campaign in upstate New York. It was another clash with Crangle, who was a key supporter of Walter Mondale.

In 1985, Pigeon ran as an "independent Democrat" for the Erie County Legislature's 9th District, challenging the incumbent Republican minority leader Robert Meier. He lost by 94 votes. The Polish American Journal quoted unnamed campaign organizers and Democratic insiders complaining of a "lack of commitment promised Pigeon by the County organization."

Pigeon won a special election to the Erie County Legislature seat for West Seneca in 1988 and then a full (two-year) term in 1989. From this office he championed an industrial park development in that town later called the North America Center. The project began Pigeon's alliance with developer Anthony Nanula.

Pigeon lost his re-election bid in 1991 to Republican Sandra Lee Wirth. Pigeon moved on to work for Bill Clinton's 1992 United States presidential election in New York's suburbs. He served on the Clinton transition team and was appointed special assistant to Secretary Donna Shalala at the U.S. Department of Health & Human Services. A Summer 1993 UB Law Forum issue then noted that Pigeon joined the law firm of Nixon, Hargrave, Devans & Doyle, (a predecessor of Nixon Peabody).

In 1994, Anthony Masiello's State Senate seat became vacant after he won the 1993 Buffalo mayoral election. The state put the vacant seat on the ballot in an off-year, off-cycle special election in February. Pigeon's associate Anthony Nanula won and Pigeon became his unpaid advisor.

Later that year Pigeon ran for State Assembly to replace his old patron Vincent Graber, in a rematch with Sandra Lee Wirth. The campaign surfaced the growing political and commercial ties between Pigeon and Anthony Nanula, including Pigeon's work as bond counsel for a project Nanula. Republicans objected to the appearance of a conflict of interest.

== Erie County Democratic Committee Chair (1996-2002) ==
Pigeon became chair of the Erie County Democratic Committee in 1996. He was 36. Erie County Executive Dennis Gorski helped install Pigeon after a split with previous county leader James Sorrentino in 1995.

Pigeon took the reins as New York Democrats sought to recover from setbacks in the Republican Revolution, most notably Mario Cuomo's loss to George Pataki in the 1994 New York gubernatorial election. He continued to support Bill Clinton in the 1996 United States presidential election. He gained clout by fostering the careers of Democrats including Charles Schumer in 1998 United States Senate election in New York and Eliot Spitzer in the 1998 New York Attorney General election who each won against incumbent Republicans.

Simultaneously, Pigeon would also antagonize members of his own party by breaking ranks, first attempting to nominate billionaire Tom Golisano as a Democrat for the 1998 New York gubernatorial election then backing his run on the ballot line of the Independence Party of New York.

Gorski himself lost his seat in 1999 to Joel Giambra, and Republicans won a number of county and judicial offices during this period. Republicans also carried the county for statewide office on multiple occasions. At the same time, Pigeon became known for supporting billionaire Tom Golisano, who had run as a third-party candidate (i.e. not a Democrat) in statewide elections.

All these actions generated considerable opposition to Pigeon's chairmanship among many Democratic leaders, such as Assemblymen Arthur Eve and Robin Schimminger, County Clerk David Swarts, and Amherst Democratic Chairman Dennis E. Ward. After the losses in the 1999 election, Pigeon was continually and publicly opposed by various factions in the party. In 2002, Masiello and Assemblyman Paul Tokasz decided to remove Pigeon, and he was replaced as chairman by Len Lenihan.

== Post-Chairman career ==
=== Work for Byron Brown ===
In 2002, Pigeon helped elect Byron W. Brown to the New York State Senate. He became a top aide to Brown. Brown later disassociated himself with Pigeon in the run-up to the 2005 mayoral election in Buffalo, which Brown won. Pigeon left the Senate payroll in 2004. Pigeon later became a consultant to the Underberg & Kessler law firm in Buffalo.

=== Work for NXIVM ===
By his own account, Pigeon worked for NXIVM from 2003 to 2011. Based in Clifton Park, New York, a suburb of Albany, NXIVM purported to be a multi-level marketing company that offered personal and professional development seminars through its "Executive Success Programs" of large-group awareness training.

From its start NXIVM was under a cloud. Its leader Keith Raniere formed the company after his multi-level marketing company, Consumers Buyline, collapsed amid accusations it ran as a pyramid scheme.

Pigeon's work for NXIVM followed the group's recruitment of Sara Bronfman and Clare Bronfman of the wealthy Bronfman family. Their heavy involvement in the company led their father Edgar Bronfman Sr. to comment in an October 2003 Forbes Magazine article that NXIVM was "a cult." According to the Times Union, NXIVM "developed a reputation for aggressively pursuing critics and defectors who broke from its ranks, including using litigation to punish critics of Raniere, the organization, or its training methods."

Frank Parlato, a former publicist for NXIVM turned adversary wrote, "It was Stone, and political consultant and lawyer, G. Steven Pigeon who got me a consulting job with NXIVM," in September 2007.

In 2009, Sarah and Clare Bronfman brought the 14th Dalai Lama to speak in Albany at an event where Raniere was on the dais. Pigeon was noted as having invited multiple Buffalo notables to the event, including Golisano.

In 2018, the United States Attorney for the Eastern District of New York arrested and indicted several members of NXIVM, including leader Keith Raniere and Clare Bronfman. In May 2018, a search warrant was executed at the home of NXIVM executive (and "Prefect") Nancy Salzman. Along with a hoard of cash were dossiers on "enemies" and prominent individuals; materials concerning Pigeon were included.

Pigeon spoke with Forbes in 2019 about Clare Bronfman and NXIVM following the organization's collapse, and claimed Raniere had manipulated and controlled Clare Bronfman, "hook, line and sinker."

=== 2008 Elections and Responsible New York ===
Pigeon was the top fundraiser in Western New York for Hillary Clinton's presidential campaign in 2008, and later raised money for Barack Obama's campaign. This activity included delivery of $1 million from Tom Golisano on the eve of Obama's nomination, as well as the formation of a political action committee named Responsible New York.

Pigeon and Golisano spoke to several New York media outlets throughout the 2008 campaign season about how they viewed the election and Responsible New York PAC as a vehicle to reshape the New York State legislature.

=== 2009 State Senate leadership crisis ===
The 2008 elections would drastically change the status quo in New York State. From 1965 until 2008, the New York State Senate had been controlled by Republicans. Democrats were able to win a majority in the 2008 elections. Steve Pigeon's patron Tom Golisano had donated $5 million to the Democrats' campaigns.

Dissatisfaction with the job that Majority Leader Malcolm Smith was doing was growing with his fellow Democrats, as well as with Golisano.

Pigeon, in concert with Tom Golisano, set up a series of private meetings between Republican senators Dean Skelos, Tom Libous, and George D. Maziarz, and rogue Democratic senator Pedro Espada Jr. The first meeting took place at a club in Albany, followed by one at Golisano's house in Rochester, followed by a series at Espada's house in Albany. Espada said that Senator Monserrate was the only one among his fellow Democrats that knew of the meetings.

Roger Stone, Republican strategist and political infighter may have been involved in the discussions, and according to Pigeon, knew about the plan in advance. Golisano, who recently moved to Florida, did not take part in the meetings at Espada's house, but was kept informed by Pigeon. On June 4, Pigeon told Golisano that the deal "was real solid," and on June 8, Golisano was in Albany to watch the events unfold from the Senate chamber balcony.

During the Senate session on June 8, 2009, Republican Senator Thomas Libous proposed a resolution, similar to a motion of no confidence, that would allow for the election of a new leader of the Senate. The entire 32-senator coalition voted for the resolution. After the resolution was passed, but before the vote was recognized by officiating officer, Senator Neil Breslin, Senator Jeffrey Klein moved for adjournment. Libous demanded that his resolution be recognized, but instead Breslin quickly granted Klein's motion for adjournment. Republicans objected, claiming a majority of the Senate did not vote to adjourn. After Breslin declared the meeting adjourned, all but four Democratic senators walked out of the Senate chamber. The Democrats who stayed were Espada and Monserrate, who had voted for the resolution, and Carl Kruger and Ruben Diaz, who abstained from all voting during the course of events but stayed to show their support.

After the 28 Democratic senators walked out of the Senate chamber, Secretary of the Senate Angelo Aponte turned off the lights in the Senate chamber and stopped the TV broadcast of the Senate session. Nevertheless, the remaining senators proceeded to vote for new leadership, removing Democratic Senator Malcolm Smith from his position as Majority Leader and Temporary President of the Senate, and replacing him with two people: Republican Minority Leader Dean Skelos as Majority Leader, and Pedro Espada as Temporary President. (Note: The position is named "temporary" because the Lieutenant Governor is the ex officio President of the State Senate, while the Temporary President is chosen by the senators. It is common, especially in the newsmedia, for the terms "temporary president", "president pro tempore", or "Senate president" to be used synonymously. In addition, the legal terminology has changed as the New York Constitution was changed. For more, see Majority Leader of the New York State Senate.) Historically, the majority leadership and the temporary presidency of the Senate were held by the same person. However, in the new arrangement, Espada was to be the Temporary President of the Senate, while Skelos would become Majority Leader.

Espada spent the remainder of his time in office under the cloud of negative press and investigations by law enforcement. He lost in 2010 to Gustavo Rivera. The following December, the US Attorney for the Eastern District of New York indicted Espada for six federal counts of embezzlement and theft. Espada vacated office in January 2011 and Steve Pigeon ceased working for the State Senate as well.

The Eastern District of New York convicted Espada in May 2012 and sentenced him to five years in prison.

=== Erie County Legislature ===
In 2010 Pigeon was part of a power-play that sacked Democrat Lynn M. Marinelli from the leadership of the Erie County Legislature, delivering it instead to Democrat Barbara Miller-Williams with the connivance of Republicans. The Buffalo News reported the deal as changing the legislature to the liking of Byron Brown, the Erie County Executive Chris Collins, and Tom Golisano.

== Controversies ==
Controversies dogged Pigeon over his entire political career. He was described as "abrasive" at the start of his time as chairman in 1996.; he would still be called "abrasive" in 2016 after his fall from grace. Pigeon accumulated numerous accusations of scandals both local and statewide.

=== Political controversies ===
Mr. Pigeon's name has been mentioned in connection with an election scandal in 2007 of the county executive campaign of former West Seneca Supervisor Paul T. Clark.

Assistant Erie County District Attorney Mark Sacha published a complete statement accusing his boss, Frank A. Sedita III, of refusing to prosecute Steve Pigeon for election law violations.

Sam Hoyt's campaign spokesman Jeremy C. Toth filed a complaint against Pigeon and Responsible New York, which he sent to the district attorneys of Erie, Monroe, and Albany counties. Toth hopes that the circumstantial case he makes that Responsible New York staff coordinated its activities with the Barbra Kavanaugh campaign—a felony—will compel the DAs to take a closer look at Pigeon and company.

Erie County's Republican elections commissioner alleged that former Democratic Chairman G. Steven Pigeon laundered thousands of dollars from Buffalo Sabres owner B. Tom Golisano's political committee and others in an attempt to conceal the origin and circumvent contribution limits, in violation of state election law.

Pigeon was named as "a key figure" in the 2009 New York State Senate leadership crisis that removed the Democratic majority from leadership of the chamber in favor of a Republican minority. Pigeon was counsel for Senator Pedro Espada who, along with embattled Senator Hiram Monserrate, benefitted from the toppling of the Democratic majority. The crisis was reportedly provoked by the displeasure of Pigeon's benefactor Tom Golisano.

In April 2010, Pigeon was linked to a federal probe involving Espada and accusations and tax fraud and money laundering. News reports linked Pigeon to the investigation based on payments made to an Espada-controlled company by a Buffalo-area firm. Espada was subsequently indicted by both the New York State Attorney General and U.S. Attorney for the Eastern District of New York. Espada was convicted in his federal trial 2012 and sentenced to 5 years in prison.

=== Guilty plea to state and federal corruption and bribery cases (2015–2018) ===
In spring of 2015, Underberg & Kessler terminated Pigeon's employment at the firm. On May 28, 2015, state and federal investigators raided Pigeon's Buffalo waterfront house as part of a joint investigation into Pigeon and the independent expenditure political action committee Western New York Progressive Caucus (WNYPC).

On June 30, 2016, New York State Attorney General Eric Schneiderman indicted Pigeon for bribery, extortion, and 7 other charges for a scheme where Pigeon attempted to gain favors from New York Supreme Court Justice John Michalek. In October 2017, the United States Attorney for the Western District of New York indicted Pigeon on federal charges mirroring these charges.

In addition, on April 19, 2017, the New York State Attorney General indicted Pigeon and two others for illegally coordinating Western New York Progressive Caucuswith several candidates for Erie County Legislature and others starting in 2013.

In September 2018, Pigeon pled guilty to state charges of third-degree bribery in connection to his interactions with former New York Supreme Court Justice John Michalek. The campaign finance charges against Pigeon were dropped following this plea, but Pigeon's two associates (Kristy Mazurek and David Pfaff) pled guilty to misdemeanor charges directly dealing with Western New York Progressive Caucus indictment.

In the federal case, Pigeon pled guilty to a superseding felony information as part of a plea agreement on October 9, 2018, accepting responsibility for participation in a conspiracy to defraud the United States, for soliciting an illegal $25,000 campaign donation from a foreign national and then disguising the transaction.

In November 2018, the Grievance Committee of the Eighth Judicial District struck Pigeon from the rolls of attorneys licensed to practice in the state of New York.

=== Guilty plea to sex offense in Erie County (2021–2023) ===
On December 1, 2021, the Buffalo News reported that the Erie County District Attorney investigated Pigeon for allegedly molesting a child. Pigeon denied the underlying accusations to the Buffalo News.

The following day, Pigeon surrendered at a New York State Police barracks, and his arraignment was held in Erie County Supreme Court. The unsealed indictment charged Pigeon with five felonies and one misdemeanor: rape in the first degree; predatory sexual assault against a child; criminal sexual act in the first degree; sexual abuse in the first degree; endangering the welfare of a child. Pigeon entered a plea of not guilty to all charges at arraignment .

Pigeon was initially remanded as an inmate at the Erie County Holding Center. Speaking with press after the arraignment, Erie County District Attorney's Erie County District Attorney John Flynn opined that remand was justified due to the violent nature of Pigeon's alleged crimes, Pigeon's lack of a permanent home in the Buffalo area, as well as his attempts to contact the family of his accuser.

On December 6, 2021, Pigeon appeared for a bail hearing before Supreme Court Judge William Boller, who set bail at $250,000 cash or $500,000 secured bond or $750,000 partially secured bond. That evening, defense attorney Paul Cambria indicated Pigeon had left jail.

On 22 December 2023, Pigeon pleaded guilty to the lesser charge of child sexual abuse and received a one-year sentence. A court hearing following his release labeled Pigeon a "sexually violent offender."

As of December 2025 Pigeon is designated and publicly listed as a sex offender by the Florida Department of Law Enforcement.

== Sources ==
- "Pigeon is still a player." The Buffalo News, December 21, 2003.
- "Power broker Pigeon still putting clout to work." The Buffalo News, February 10, 2003.
- "Final chapter in Democratic infighting." The Buffalo News, September 8, 2002.
- "You can never county Pigeon out." The Buffalo News, May 12, 2002.
- "Pigeon takes party helm, calls for unity." The Buffalo News, September 29, 1996.
