= Politics of upstate New York =

The prevailing political ethos of the residents of upstate New York varies from that of their downstate counterparts.

== Voting patterns ==
Often attributed to the region's rural to semi-rural character, it is more conservative in culture and politics than the more urban downstate area, and it is the power base of the state's Republican Party. Upstate New York, however, has several pockets of Democratic influence. Western New York, particularly Buffalo, has been a Democratic stronghold for over a century. The Capital District, particularly Albany, Schenectady and Troy, was long the only Democratic bastion in the eastern upstate. Other pockets of Democratic strength are Monroe County (Rochester), Onondaga County (Syracuse), and Tompkins County (Ithaca).

As a whole, upstate New York is roughly equally divided in federal elections between Democrats and Republicans. In 2004, John Kerry defeated George W. Bush by less than 1,500 votes (1,553,246 votes to 1,551,971) in the upstate region.

Historically, the Republicans in the region more closely resemble Rockefeller Republicans, who were pro-business but socially liberal Republicans who supported the policies of former Governor Nelson Rockefeller. Others are libertarians like Republicans in Vermont, New Hampshire, Maine, and some western states, instead of the social conservatism of the southern states and the Religious Right. However, the Religious Right is still influential in the area, mainly in the Central New York and Tug Hill Plateau regions.

The influence of public service labor unions is a factor in the Democratic Party's continued strength in the region. Hospitals and public schools are among the area's largest employers, and the agencies have unionized workers. Unionized workers as a whole make up one fourth of New York workers, the most in the nation. The unions, most notably the Service Employees International Union and New York State United Teachers, make large purchases of television air time on local television and radio stations during budget negotiations and prior to school budget votes to air commercials featuring scare tactics threatening the closure of hospitals or emergency rooms, larger class sizes, and reduced care unless they receive more money. Organized rebuttals have been few and far between although more frequent in recent years. Eliot Spitzer's use of his personal campaign funds to push through his 2007 reforms was the first, and more recent movements include the Rochester businessman Tom Golisano's Responsible New York campaign and the Buffalo developer Carl Paladino's calls for a constitutional convention directly to quash union-friendly laws such as the "Wicks Law" and the Taylor Law.

Upstate politicians have sometimes taken the leading role in the moves that give the state its liberal reputation. It was George Michaels, an assemblyman from the Finger Lakes, who in 1970 asked that his vote of "no" on the bill to legalize abortion in New York be changed to "yes," causing the bill to pass by one vote. Nearly three decades later, voters in Plattsburgh elected Daniel L. Stewart, the state's first openly-gay mayor, a Republican. Another upstate mayor, Jason West of New Paltz, drew national attention in early 2004 when he officiated at the state's first gay weddings.

Upstate Democrats have traditionally leaned further to the right than downstate Democrats, particularly in Buffalo and Niagara Falls. Jack Quinn, a Republican, was elected from a district that was 57 percent Democratic. Similarly, leading Democrats in the area, including Dennis Gorski, Anthony Masiello and James D. Griffin, were noted for their fiscal and social conservatism and were often cross-endorsed by the Conservative Party of New York. Other examples of moderate to conservative leaning Democrats include Michael McNulty, John LaFalce, Scott Murphy, and Brian Higgins.

One example of the ideological divide between upstate and downstate Democrats was the reaction to Governor David Paterson's appointment of Congresswoman Kirsten Gillibrand, who represented the New York's 20th District in the Adirondacks, to the US Senate. Downstate Democrats were skeptical of Gillibrand's positions on gun control and immigration, which while mainstream in upstate New York, were to the right of positions of downstate Democratic activists like Congresswoman Carolyn McCarthy. Paterson's appointment of Gillibrand was believed to be an effort to enhance his own chances in a general election by presenting a balanced ticket, which would appeal to moderates and upstate voters. The last time that New York has had a senator of either party from upstate was the Republican Charles E. Goodell in 1971; he was forced out by a more conservative downstate candidate (James Buckley) on a third-party challenge.

Proponents of the 2008 presidential run by Senator Hillary Clinton have pointed to her relative success upstate (she lost the region by less than 10 percent of the vote in 2000) as an argument that she could succeed as a candidate in red states. Skeptics of such a bid have responded that upstate is not as conservative as what is now the leadership of the Republican Party.

Most of New York State's most successful Republican politicians, however, such as Rockefeller, George Pataki, Thomas Dewey, Fiorello La Guardia, Jacob Javits and Alfonse D'Amato, came from downstate. Most upstate Republicans are politically unacceptable to even downstate Republican voters, and most of the party's financial backers are based downstate. That was a key factor in forcing the Buffalo politician Chris Collins out of a potential run for governor in 2010.

Nevertheless, Republican attempts upstate to court votes by openly appealing to suspicion of New York City have usually backfired. In 1998, the incumbent and Long Island native Republican Senator Al D'Amato's Senate campaign ran television ads in some upstate markets attempting to link his opponent, Charles Schumer, to a flock of hungry sharks that were released from New York City to fleece upstate. Schumer went on to win the election and did well in upstate areas.

Politicians based upstate rarely win elections for governor or senator, but some have been elected to other lesser state-wide offices, such as lieutenant governor (Stan Lundine, Maryanne Krupsak, Mary Donohue, Robert Duffy and Kathy Hochul for instance), comptroller (Edward Regan) and attorney general (Dennis Vacco).

The sharp differences in ideology have historically fueled many political struggles by upstate conservatives with largely downstate-based Democrats in the New York Legislature, but the feuds quite often tend to be more on regional lines than on party lines. The most recent major examples were the failed attempt by the Syracuse-area assemblyman Michael Bragman, the majority leader of that body, to seize control of the downstate-dominated state Democratic Party in 2000. That was immediately followed by a strong retaliatory backlash against all upstate politicians in state government and the attempt by both Republicans and Democrats to cater to upstate voters by promising to disband the New York State Thruway, whose toll portions are entirely upstate. Both candidates in the 2006 gubernatorial election (Democrat Eliot Spitzer and Republican John Faso) pledged to eliminate the tolls. However, so far, only an eight-mile stretch of I-190 in downtown Buffalo, which had been collecting tolls so that I-84 downstate would remain a free highway, has been made toll-free. In fact, the thruway authority has steadily increased tolls annually since 2006. Critics upstate feel that it is unlikely that either party would genuinely be willing to give up such a significant source of revenue, despite promises to the contrary, particularly since it that does not draw its funding from the population core downstate.

Republicans have traditionally controlled the State Senate by virtue of holding most seats upstate, even if the state as a whole swung Democratic. However, the leadership has often been split between upstate senators, such as Joseph Bruno, and Long Islanders such as the former majority leader, Dean Skelos.

The 2008 State Senate elections shifted political power in the chamber from the upstate-heavy Republicans to the New York City-centered Democrats. However, as evidence of continued Republican strength in the upstate, the Democrats won all but three seats in New York City but only five seats north of Westchester County. Skelos, a Long Island native, hatched a plan to lure four conservative New York City Democrats (known collectively as the "Gang of Four") to vote for Skelos as leader of the Senate in exchange for committee assignments, but the move backfired since the Democrats in question got the committee assignments ahead of the upstate senators who were expected to get them, but they turned and announced their support for Senate Democratic leader Malcolm Smith, as part of a deal that had been ironically hatched by upstate politicians Steven Pigeon and Tom Golisano. As a result, several State Senate Republicans have considered reaching out to the five upstate Democrats, compared to 27 downstate Democrats, in the chamber to form a coalition, including the Buffalo Democrat William Stachowski, who would have earned a powerful committee leadership position had it not been for the Gang of Four deal. Stachowski and the others have so far rebuffed any suggestions they would break ranks. In an effort to retain the upstate Democrats, Smith nominated Syracuse Senator David Valesky as his second-in-command. Upstate Democrats such as Valesky, Stachowski, and Darrel Aubertine often face significant pressure from constituents and other upstate lawmakers to hold more conservative positions than their downstate counterparts.

In the congressional elections of 2006 and 2008, many upstate seats that had been historically held by Republicans came under serious challenge by Democratic contenders, and some (such as the 20th, 24th, and 29th districts) were lost to Democrats even with Republican voter enrollment advantages remaining in place. The seats went back to the Republicans in 2010. Slow population growth in the 1990s led legislators to eliminate two upstate House districts in the 2002 reapportionment and to leave all downstate districts alone, and so the influence of upstate in Congress has faded from the days in which Jack Kemp, Barber Conable, and Sam Stratton were prominent House leaders. Two more districts, at least one of which is certain to be upstate, were to be eliminated in the 2012 reapportionment. However, current upstate house members such as Kathy Hochul, Tom Reed, and Ann Marie Buerkle have earned significant notoriety (both positive and negative) for their accomplishments on Capitol Hill.

A growing movement exists among New York City residents to buy summer homes in upstate tourist communities and vote in elections there, where their vote would have more influence, a move that has drawn significant enmity from local residents.

Upstate New York showed an unusual amount of electoral strength when Buffalo's Carl Paladino and Panama's Greg Edwards defeated downstate candidates Rick Lazio and Thomas Ognibene for the Republican nomination in the New York gubernatorial election, 2010, largely by their overwhelming support upstate and in Western New York (as high as 93% for Paladino in his home county of Erie County). Both gubernatorial candidates had picked a candidate from the other side of the state as their running mate (Lazio with Edwards and Paladino with Ognibene), but voters were free to combine their own ticket à la carte in the primary elections, which resulted in native favorites winning both races. Paladino, in particular, completed a near-sweep of upstate counties, but the downstate counties voted heavily for Lazio. Paladino and Edwards went on to lose the general election to the downstate Democrat Andrew Cuomo and his running mate, Rochester's Bob Duffy. Paladino and Edwards won the eight counties of the Buffalo media market (including their home counties), the rural counties in the Southern Tier, and two other rural counties upstate. Cuomo won the rest of the region in addition to a complete sweep of downstate New York. Upstate also showed strength in the 2012 senatorial Republican primary in which the Manhattan attorney Wendy E. Long campaigned heavily upstate and rode it to victory over her Republican primary opponent, the favorite, Brooklyn Congressman Bob Turner. None of the candidates in the primary was from the upstate region. Long was even less successful than Paladino by winning only two counties en route to a 45% loss to Gillbrand.

In 2014, the downstate Republican Rob Astorino, running with Chemung County Sheriff Christopher Moss, lost the gubernatorial election but performed better than usual in upstate by winning several counties, including Saint Lawrence and Monroe Counties, that traditionally vote Democrat.

== Presidential voting patterns ==
These results are fashioned from the following counties being within downstate New York: Bronx, Kings (Brooklyn), New York (Manhattan), Queens, Richmond (Staten Island) [encompassing New York City], Nassau, Suffolk [encompassing the majority of Long Island], Westchester, and Rockland counties. The remainder (including Putnam County) belong to upstate New York.

Upstate New York Presidential elections results
Year	Democratic	Republican	Independent	Others
2024	48.98% 1,624,869	50.02% 1,659,460	1.00% 14,023	1.00% 14,023
2020	50.76% 1,757,363	47.21% 1,634,429	0.40% 14,023	1.62% 56,203
2016	45.24% 1,413,176	47.71% 1,490,242	3.60% 112,887	3.69% 115,463
2012	53.50% 1,577,284	44.49% 1,311,618	0.95% 28,152	2.07% 61,686
2008	53.18% 1,708,772	46.82% 1,504,543	0.84% 27,217	1.90% 61,282
2004	49.23% 1,553,246	49.19% 1,551,971	1.76% 56,205	0.92% 29,336
2000	49.33% 1,469,087	45.30% 1,348,930	4.10% 123,617	2.41% 72,565
1996	49.66% 1,419,077	36.76% 1,050,511	11.30% 325,684	3.01% 86,790
1992	39.31% 1,241,203	36.72% 1,159,280	22.53% 704,182	0.69% 21,420
1988	46.71% 1,340,248	52.49% 1,506,011		0.80% 22,992
1984	34.49% 1,158,830	60.17% 1,765,919		0.34% 10,087
1980	41.65% 1,153,234	47.93% 1,327,072	8.51% 235,627	1.90% 52,516
1976	44.06% 1,233,220	55.57% 1,555,430		0.69% 19,429
1972	36.30% 1,032,633	63.45% 1,805,076		0.25% 7,174
1968	44.12% 1,183,698	49.60% 1,330,622	5.53% 147,776	0.46% 12,280
1964	68.18% 1,876,429	31.73% 873,257		0.10% 2,664
1960	45.87% 1,317,838	54.05% 1,552,646		0.07% 2,058

Downstate New York Presidential elections results
Year	Democratic	Republican	Independent	Others
2024	59.54% 2,761,971	38.96% 1,807,309	1.51% 69,871	1.51% 69,871
2020	67.66% 3,487,523	31.38% 1,617,568	0.17% 8,633	0.80% 41,119
2016	68.35% 3,142,948	28.91% 1,329,292	63,711	121,358
2012	70.37% 2,908,593	28.52% 1,178,878	19,104	59,460
2008	69.86% 3,060,928	30.14% 1,320,570	14,034	65,400
2004	65.42% 2,761,973	33.39% 1,409,657	43,668	42,915
2000	68.64% 2,638,820	27.42% 1,054,391	120,781	132,964
1996	67.58% 2,337,100	25.53% 882,981	177,774	159,212
1992	57.97% 2,203,247	31.24% 1,187,369	386,539	23,685
1988	55.51% 2,007,634	43.57% 1,575,860		32,938
1984	50.64% 1,960,779	49.04% 1,898,844		12,351
1980	45.88% 1,575,138	45.64% 1,566,759	232,174	59,153
1976	57.87% 2,156,338	41.47% 1,545,361		24,642
1972	44.44% 1,918,451	55.31% 2,387,702		10,794
1968	53.44% 2,194,772	40.84% 1,677,310	211,088	32,520
1964	68.80% 3,036,727	31.05% 1,370,302		6,636
1960	56.86% 2,512,247	42.86% 1,893,773		12,261

== Gubernatorial voting patterns ==
Upstate Results
Year	Democratic	Republican	Independent	Others
2022	1,172,345	1,412,410		
2018	1,096,661	1,291,834	48,087	177,259
2014	802,498	936,881	109,951	71,055
2010	1,126,281	930,596	40,238	158,283
2006	1,352,108	752,870	19,602	118,915
2002	515,094	1,093,191	462,636	113,609
1998	406,531	1,399,994	277,243	191,980
1994	774,609	1,451,591	176,559	85,498
1990	896,989	498,151	511,536	212,520
1986	1,254,381	741,716	49,840	76,307
1982	996,503	1,338,091	16,236	101,815
1978	949,971	1,102,523	63,581	84,204
1974	1,178,268	1,081,943		129,195
1970	875,735	1,254,971	188,586	

== See also ==
- Politics of New York (state)
- New York State Legislature
- Secession in New York
