= 2001 Buffalo mayoral election =

- November 6, 2001
- Turnout: 13.06%
Nominee	Anthony Masiello
Party	Democratic
Alliance	Republican; Independence; Conservative
Popular vote	37,685
Percentage	98.63%
- Results by city council district Masiello: >90%
Mayor before election
Anthony Masiello
Democratic
Elected mayor
Anthony Masiello
Democratic

The 2001 Buffalo Mayoral election took place on November 6, 2001. Incumbent Anthony M. Masiello, a Democrat, easily trounced his sole opponent in the primary, going on to win a third term with no serious opposition in the general election. Buffalo's 2001 mayoral election was notable for its uncharacteristic quietness, despite pressing issues such as allegations of environmental contamination in the Hickory Woods neighborhood of South Buffalo and chronic poverty and urban blight. This was speculated as being due to reticence on the part of would-be candidates to "challenge a powerful and well-liked mayor like Masiello", especially one with a campaign fund in excess of $1 million. It was also only the second time in history when the Democrats and Republicans endorsed the same candidate for mayor of Buffalo, a phenomenon made possible by New York State's electoral fusion law.

== Democratic primary ==
Masiello's opponent in the primary was Beverly A. Gray, who had served as an at-large member of the Buffalo Common Council since 1996. Despite her endorsement by fellow Councilmember Charley Fisher, and her candidacy's survival in the face of electoral petition challenges and her own health problems, Gray was badly outspent by Masiello, and her campaign was hampered by criticism by Erie County Democratic Committee chairman Steve Pigeon of her tenure on the Council as "divisive" and "extremist", and of her mayoral campaign as devoid of a coherent message and failing to make a real effort to reach voters outside the African-American community. The Democratic primary election took place on September 25, 2001; Masiello placed first with 20,980 votes cast, or 72.4% of the total, with Gray receiving 7,988 votes, or 27.6% of the total.

Democratic primary results
Party	Candidate	Votes	%
Democratic	Anthony M. Masiello	20,980	72.42%
Democratic	Beverly A. Gray	7,988	27.58%
Total votes		28,968	100%

== General election ==
The general election was held on November 6, 2001. Masiello was the only official candidate in an election that was marked by historically low voter turnout, with 37,685 votes, or 98.6% of the total, going to him. Masiello's closest challenger was neighborhood activist Judith Einach, whose independent write-in campaign garnered 523 votes, or 1.4% of the total. The Buffalo News and other local media outlets were criticized by some for their lack of coverage of Einach's campaign.

=== Other potential candidates ===
Early in the race, New York State Assemblyman Sam Hoyt and Buffalo Common Council president (and contender in the previous Democratic primary) Jim Pitts, both Democrats, were speculated as possible candidates. Both declined to run.

Erie County Legislator Gregory Olma explored a run as a Democrat, but said he would not officially contest the Democratic primary unless he was cross-endorsed by the Erie County Republican Party, an endorsement that ultimately went to Masiello.

Local attorney and government reform advocate Kevin Gaughan also sought the endorsement of both the Democratic and Republican parties. Gaughan's candidacy was controversial from the beginning, as he was a resident of the suburb of Hamburg until May 2001, taking advantage of an oversight in the rewriting of the city charter the previous year that eliminated the requirement for mayoral candidates to have lived in Buffalo for at least one year prior to the election. An effort by the Buffalo Common Council in response to Gaughan's candidacy to amend the charter was ultimately shelved, but Gaughan dropped out of the race in June after having lost the crucial Republican endorsement to Masiello.

Buffalo Common Councilman-at-Large Charley H. Fisher initially declined to run, but in early April 2001 said that he would challenge Masiello for the Democratic primary if neither Gray nor Pitts officially entered the race by April 24, calling the prospect of Masiello running unopposed in the primary "a disservice to the City of Buffalo" and remarking that the incumbent did not "deserve a free ride". Fisher was also reported to have sought the Independence Party endorsement, which ultimately went to Masiello. Fisher dropped out of the race after Gray officially announced her candidacy on April 25.

=== Party endorsements ===
Masiello was endorsed by the Democratic, Republican, Independence, and Conservative Parties. The Liberal, Working Families, Right to Life, and Green Parties declined to endorse any candidate.

=== Results ===
General election results
Party	Candidate	Votes	%
Democratic	Anthony Masiello	24,700	64.65%
Republican	Anthony Masiello	10,255	26.84%
Independence	Anthony Masiello	1,631	4.27%
Conservative	Anthony Masiello	1,099	2.88%
Total	Anthony Masiello (incumbent)	37,685	98.63%
Independent	Judith S. Einach	523	1.37%
Total votes		38,208	100%
