= Arthur Eve =

New York politician (born 1933)

Arthur O. Eve

Deputy Speaker of the New York State Assembly
- In office 1979–2002
- Preceded by: William F. Passannante
- Succeeded by: Clarence Norman Jr.

Member of the New York State Assembly from the 141st district
- In office 1983–2002
- Preceded by: John B. Sheffer
- Succeeded by: Crystal Peoples-Stokes

Member of the New York State Assembly from the 143rd district
- In office 1967–1982
- Preceded by: Donald Shoemaker
- Succeeded by: Dennis Gorski

Personal details
- Born: March 23, 1933 (age 93) New York, New York, U.S.
- Party: Democratic
- Spouse(s): Constance Eve (m. 1956)
- Children: 5 (including Leecia)
- Education: Erie Community College, (Assoc.); West Virginia University, (B.S.)

Military service
- Branch/service: United States Army
- Years of service: 1953–1955
- Rank: Corporal
- Unit: United States Army

Arthur Owen Eve (born March 23, 1933) is a retired American politician who served as a Democratic member of the New York State Assembly (1967–2002) and Deputy Speaker of the Assembly (1979–2002) representing districts in Buffalo, New York. He was the first Dominican-American elected to public office in the United States, and the first African American to win a Buffalo mayoral Democratic primary but was defeated in the following mayoral election.

Eve was elected a New York State Assemblyman in 1966 and by the time of his retirement in 2002 had served in the New York State Assembly (143rd District 1967–82, 141st District 1983–2002) longer than any other incumbent member. As Deputy Speaker, he was the highest ranking African American in the New York State Legislature. During his political career he became a political foe of Western New York politician James D. Griffin and of New York State Governors Mario Cuomo and George Pataki. He was a founding member of the New York State Black and Puerto Rican Legislative Caucus. At the national level, Eve was once one of three alternates to the 15-person 1984 Democratic Party Platform Committee.

Eve was an observer and negotiator during the 1971 Attica Prison riot and the first official to enter the facility to hear the demands of the inmates. An advocate for liberal causes such as economic development, education, job training and development, social services, crime prevention and parole reform, day care and housing, Eve was also a leader in the movement to legislate Harriet Tubman Day as a New York State holiday. He is the father of attorney and former candidate for Lieutenant Governor of New York Leecia Eve.

== Early life and family ==
Eve was born in New York City, to an immigrant father from the Dominican Republic. He was raised in Florida. After studies at West Virginia State College he arrived in Buffalo in February 1953 as a product of the segregated south, with less than $10 ($120 today) in his pocket. Eve served in the United States Army from 1953–1955 and achieved the rank of corporal. Eve holds an Associate's degree from Erie Community College and a Bachelor of Science from West Virginia. He had been an All-High basketball player in Florida and became an All-Europe player during his Army tour of duty in Germany, where he ran a program for orphans. After completing his Army service he returned to Buffalo in 1955. Eve's first job in Buffalo was in a Chevrolet plant. While working there he became aware of drugs problems with local youths in the city's parks, and observed a lack of guidance for youth in the community. He surrendered his job to pursue a post in parks recreation, but learned that such jobs were doled out by political patronage to party loyalists. Eve joined the Democratic Party and got one of the patronage parks jobs. By 1958, he was blossoming as an independent activist within the party, pursuing minority rights, and was the only ward leader who was not part of the political establishment. This role led to his 1966 New York State Assembly election victory.

Eve and Constance Bowles (born July 14, 1932), also an alumnus of West Virginia State College, were married in June 1956. They have one daughter and four sons: Leecia Roberta Eve, Arthur O. Eve Jr.; Eric Vincent Eve, Martin King Eve, and Malcolm X. Eve. Leecia is a Democratic politician and attorney and a former candidate for Lieutenant Governor of New York during the 2006 election as well as a contender to replace Hillary Clinton as United States Senator when Clinton became United States Secretary of State in 2009. Eric, who was a White House aide under Bill Clinton, ran Al Gore's New York State 2000 Democratic presidential primary campaign. Malcolm also worked for the Clinton administration, and the Obama administration.

Eve, who was an Episcopalian, has a history of being a religious man. He was a deacon in his church in the 1970s. After his retirement from politics, he became an evangelist.

== Political career ==
=== Assemblyman 1967–1978 ===
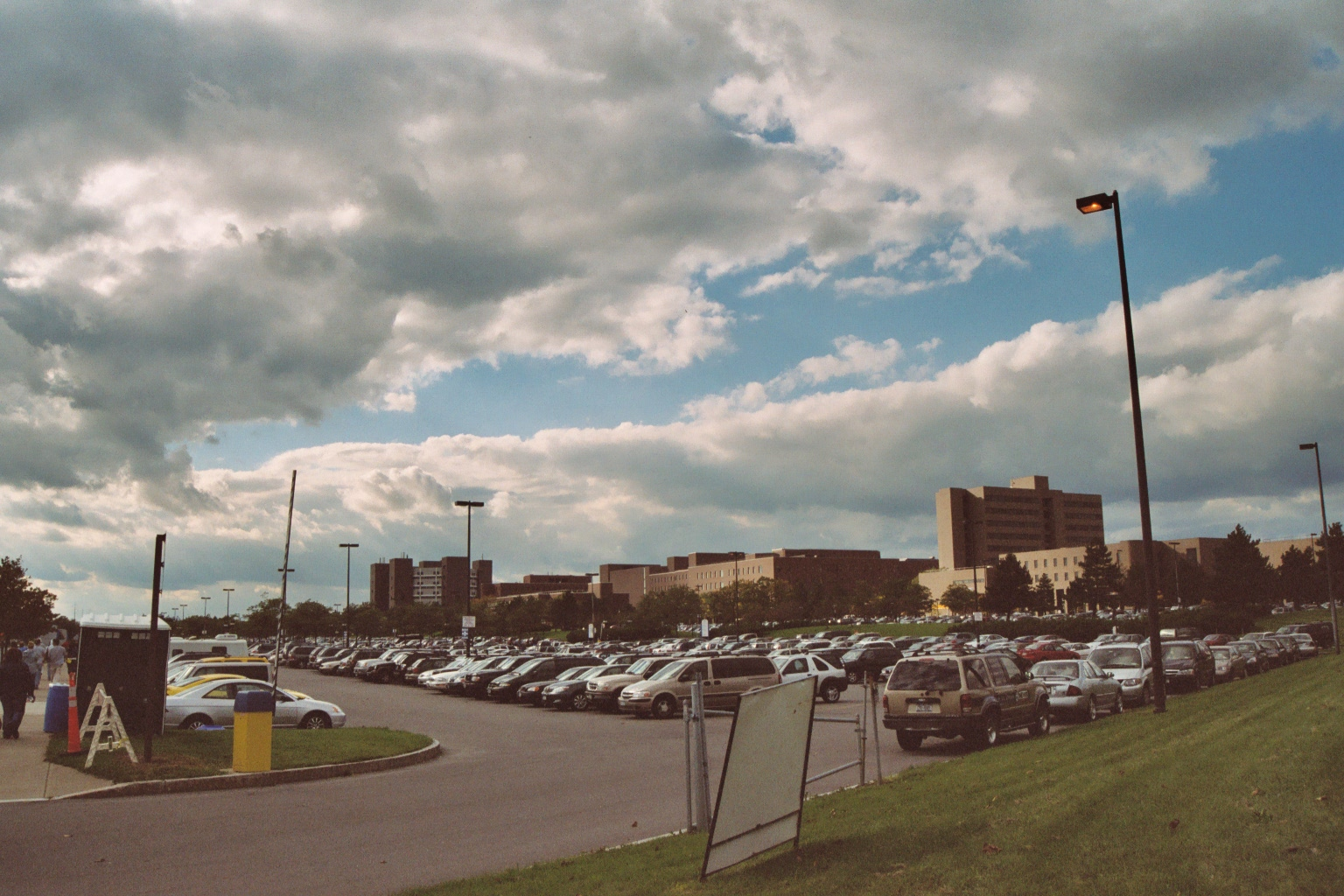
Eve held up construction of the SUNY-Buffalo North Campus to secure minorities construction apprenticeship access.

Eve was elected to the New York State Assembly in 1966 following several years of service as an independent ward leader in Buffalo. His election came via defeating two-term incumbent Arthur Hardwick, Jr. in a Democratic primary contest. He remained in the Assembly until 2002, sitting in the 177th, 178th, 179th, 180th, 181st, 182nd, 183rd, 184th, 185th, 186th, 187th, 188th, 189th, 190th, 191st, 192nd, 193rd and 194th New York State Legislatures. Eve rose to prominence in the mid-1960s during Buffalo's civil disturbances and rights. He expanded his notability during the Attica Prison riots. During the Buffalo riot of 1967, Eve attempted to organize formal meetings in order to avert physical confrontations. Eve fought against union policies which disallowed minority participation in apprentice programs that led to high paying union jobs on state construction sites. He threatened New York Governor Nelson Rockefeller that he would lie down in front of bulldozers at one of these sites. In 1968, he delayed construction on the State University of New York at Buffalo's Amherst Campus to push through an agreement that New York State and the unions would promote minority access into the construction industry. The protests by supporters of Eve's effort caused Rockefeller to call for an eleven-month construction moratorium starting in March 1969.

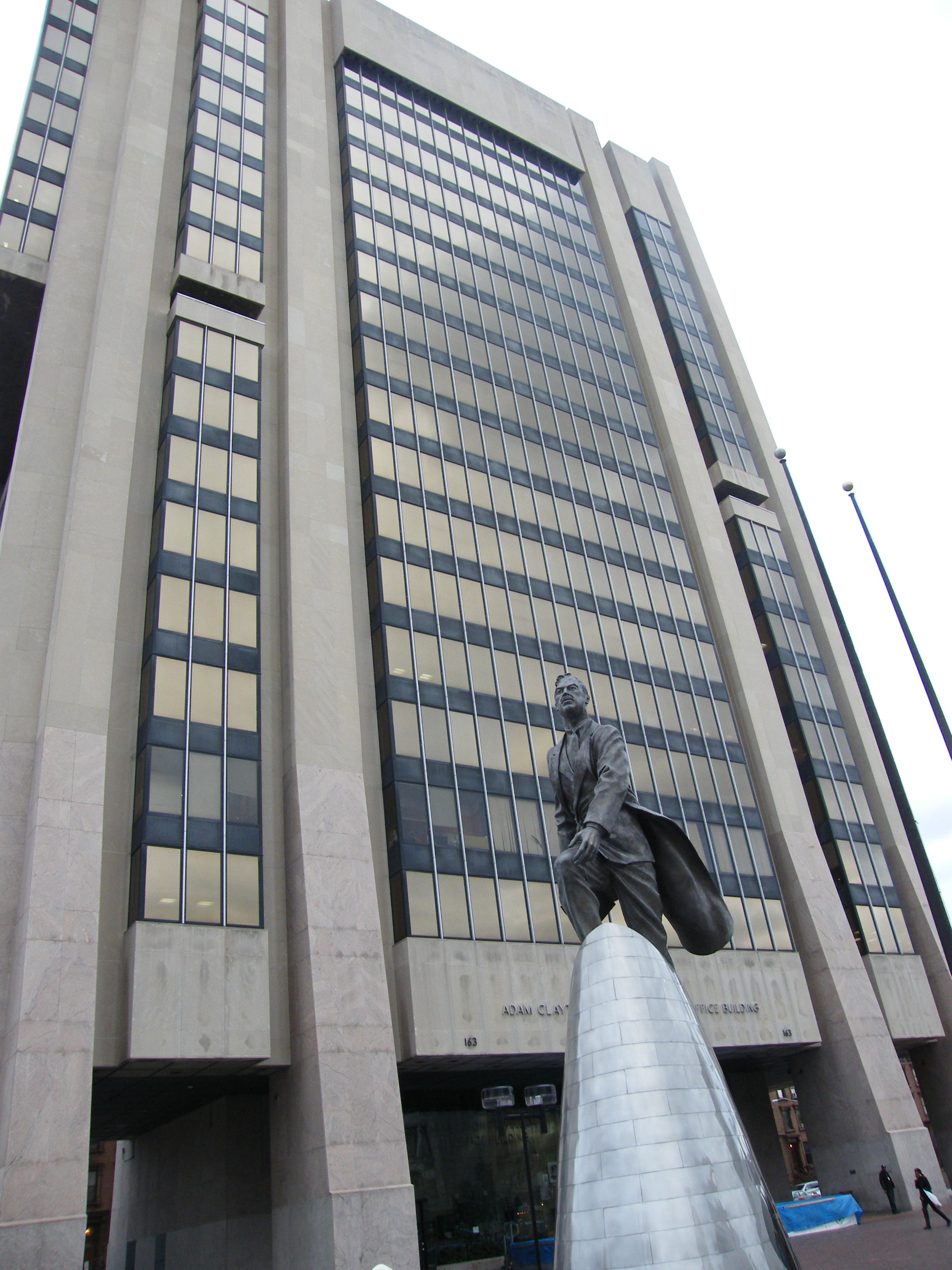
Eve brokered negotiations for the Adam Clayton Powell Jr. State Office Building.

In April 1969, the construction of the Adam Clayton Powell Jr. State Office Building (originally known as the Harlem State Office Building) at 125th Street and Seventh Avenue became a political quagmire. Originally, Rockefeller had proposed a 20-story office building and a 10-story cultural and civic center, but the legislature only approved funding for the office building. Eventually, there was protesting by the Harlem community that halted construction. Eve brokered discussions between Rockefeller and State Senator Basil Paterson, who represented the disgruntled Harlem community.

During Eve's first term as an assemblyman, he led the effort to obtain an initial $500,000 ($4.8 million as of 2025) of funding to establish the State University of New York system's SEEK/Educational Opportunity Program. Since the 1970s, colleges in New York State have administered the Arthur O. Eve Higher Education Opportunity Program to assist students who may otherwise be unable to attend college because of educational and financial circumstances. Later, in 1988, he would receive the Kennedy Center Distinguished Leadership in Arts-in-Education award.

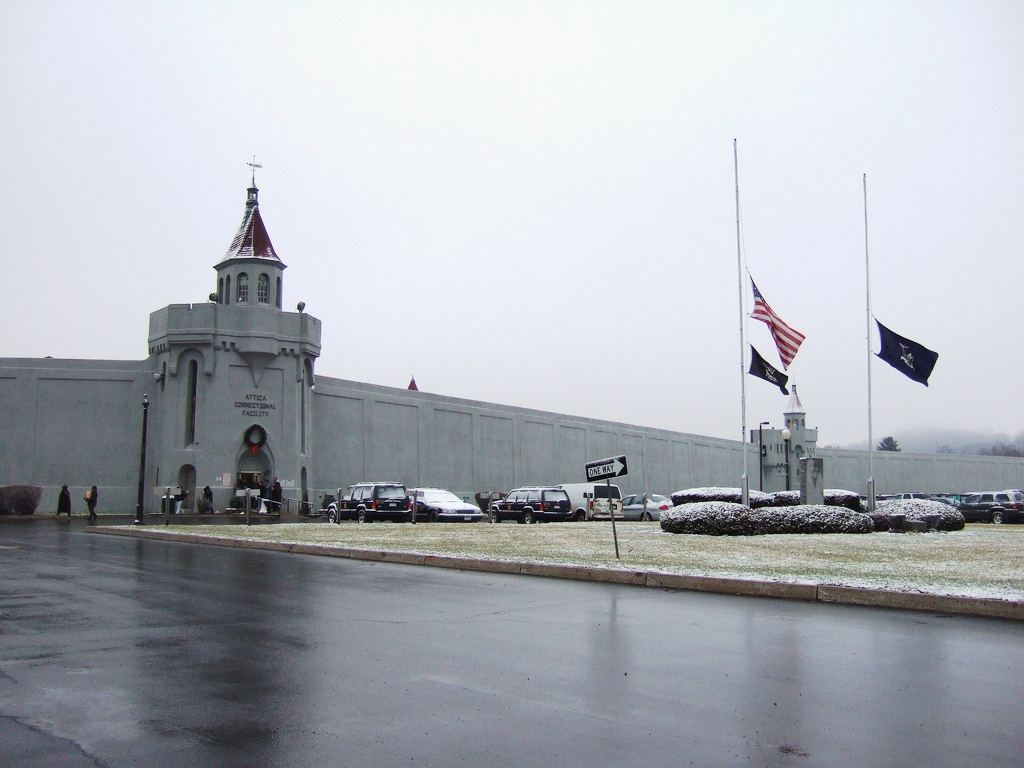
Attica Correctional Facility

In the late 1960s, Eve drove a constituent to Attica State Prison, which is 35 miles (56 km) from Buffalo. After observing the prison's conditions, he began to introduce prison reform legislation to the state assembly. Since most legislators were fearful of political backlash and avoided prison reform issues, Eve became the primary channel through which prisoners could forward their complaints and requests. His compassion for the prisoners was recognised by them. For example, in the months following the eight-hour November 4, 1970, seizure of the Auburn Correctional Facility, Eve was the only legislator named as a recipient of prisoner complaints.

"I do not blame Mr. Oswald for the decision to go in. I can never believe that he gave it. All the blame goes to Rockefeller."

— Eve on the use of force to retake the Attica Correctional Facility after the Attica Prison riot.

Eve served as an observer and negotiator in the wake of the 1971 Attica Prison riot. Believing that the situation called for people who were credible to both the prison population as well as to people involved with and observing the situation from outside the prison, he joined Tom Wicker and John Dunne, among others, in entering the prison to hear the inmates' demands. Eve was the first mediator to arrive at the scene of the rebellion. He was the first elected official to enter the prison yard following the riot in which 42 prisoners were taken, and he led the September 11 tour by the requested visitors to the seized Cellblock D as well as other areas of the prison. The prisoners requested direct communication with the Commissioner of Corrections, Russell G. Oswald, and that specific individuals hear their demands, naming Louis Farrakhan, Huey Newton, and William Kunstler; Kunstler eventually agreed to serve as their legal counsel. The primary prisoner demand was that, upon surrendering control of the prison back to the guards, they not be beaten. Farrakhan refused to attend to the situation in person, however, which Eve felt was a turning point in the negotiations. Eve has expressed the belief that Governor Rockefeller was responsible for the massacre that subsequently occurred in the prison, and that Rockefeller made a deliberate decision to escalate the conflict knowing that there would likely be some loss of life. After negotiations stalled over a demand for amnesty, a rescue operation saved 29 hostages and led to 10 inmate deaths. Eve was critical of Rockefeller's decision to not come observe the prison and the negotiations but rather pursue tactical measures: "I think Governor Rockefeller ought to be indicted." In the 1992 Attica civil-liability trial, Eve testified on behalf of the inmates. In March 2001, then New York Governor George Pataki appointed Eve to the Attica Task Force that met with families of Attica prison employees who survived the 1971 uprising and negotiated reparations.

In February 1971, Eve sponsored two bills. One called for a minimum of 0.5% of construction funds be allocated to on-the-job training for construction workers. The other was an initiative to have Buffalo Public Schools be decentralized like New York City Public Schools had been the prior year.

In the 1974 elections, New York State Democratic Chairman, Joseph F. Crangle, attempted to block Eve from obtaining the Democratic nomination. After the 1974 election, Eve was the senior Assemblyman among the blacks and Puerto Ricans. Following the 1974 elections in which 15 of the 18 newly Democratic seats were from non-New York City Democrats, the upstate delegation was credited with giving the democrats a majority. That year marked the year in which upstate democrats demanded that there be some division of the Democratic minority leader, Democratic deputy minority leader, Assistant minority leader, minority whip, and ranking member of the Ways and Means committee, which had all previously been given to New York City officials. Incoming Governor Hugh Carey was also interested in a geographic division of key positions in order to promote party unity. Eve sat on a 1978 Medicaid reimbursement evaluation committee.

=== 1977 Mayoral campaign ===
On March 3, 1977, Buffalo's incumbent mayor Stanley Makowski announced he would not seek reelection in May; on the same day, Eve announced his candidacy for the post. Despite his numerous successes at fostering communication, he was described as a militant civil rights leader. Eve's primary campaign was described by Frank Prial of The New York Times as a campaign against Crangle rather than his handpicked candidate, Leslie Foschio. Eve declared his intentions early to add incentive to a voter registration drive, and he modeled his campaign after Carl Stokes' 1967 Mayor of Cleveland election, which used decentralized election districts. Although he was expected to finish no better than third in the four-way race, he believed in a strategy to take 90 percent of the black vote and 10 percent of the rest. 30% of the 425,000 Buffalo residents were black at the time. Eve's candidacy blossomed during the four televised Democratic debates. Eve capitalized on Jimmy Griffin's late campaign strategy of describing the Mayor job as simple like all jobs. Eve and his supporters supposedly registered 10,000 new black voters.

Eve became the first African-American to win the Democratic Party's Buffalo Mayoral Primary election. Eve won the primary for the Democratic nomination by a 25,538–23,579 (approximately 37%–34%) margin over Griffin. Eve's victory brought out acts of racist aggression against him and his family, as a cross was burned on his front lawn and his family was subjected to threatening telephone calls.

During the campaign, the Rev Jesse Jackson attended and spoke at a rally in support of Eve at the St. John Baptist Church in Buffalo.

Griffin subsequently became the Conservative Party's nominee; third-placed primary finisher Foschio also threatened to enter the general election. Eve was supported by Erie County Democratic Committee Chairman Joseph F. Crangle, who hoped to prevent a third Democrat, such as Foschio, from running in the general election by endorsing Eve publicly, but Eve campaigned without Crangle's backing or that of the Democratic Party. Eve spurned Chairman Crangle's endorsement because the endorsement would have caused him to be associated with the Crangle machine. He subsequently distanced himself from Crangle by announcing that he was not supporting the chairman's bid for re-election in 1978. The 1977 Buffalo Mayoral primary had had a voter turnout of 77–80% in the Black community, the highest ever for an African American community in the Northeast, and surpassed nationwide in terms of African American voter turnout only by the 1967 Mayor of Cleveland election of Carl Stokes. Griffin went on to win the general election by a ten percent margin over Eve, beating him and Republican candidate John J. Phelan out.

=== Deputy Speaker era 1979–2003 ===
By 1978 Eve had attained the title of Deputy Majority Leader. Eve, who had been chairperson of the Black and Puerto Rican Legislative Caucus in 1975 and 1976, was appointed Deputy Speaker of the New York State Assembly during the 1979 legislative session. Because of the lack of minority representation in either chamber of the New York State Legislature, as Deputy Speaker, Eve was the highest-ranking black legislator while in office. In 1979, the Democratic majority fell from 90–60 to 86–64, while the caucus' Assembly membership had grown from 15 to 16. This meant that the caucus had a much stronger position to obstruct legislation by withholding it votes, since 76 votes were necessary for legislation to pass. In 1980, Eve resumed his chairmanship of the Black and Puerto Rican Legislative Caucus. The following year, Eve was elected unanimously to a committee to study state election law when he complained that no blacks were on the committee even though he said his complaint should have not been taken as an effort to lobby for a position.

Eve and fellow Democrat Griffin remained political rivals throughout their careers. In 1982, Griffin and New York City Mayor Ed Koch, each of whom had first been elected as the mayor of one of New York State's two largest cities in 1977, were considering running together for Governor and New York State Lieutenant Governor. Eve adamantly opposed the ticket, speaking in support of Mario Cuomo. Eventually, Griffin decided not to pursue statewide office. In 1983, Deputy Speaker Eve was no longer Caucus Chairman.

In 1984, Eve joined with James F. Notaro, the Liberal Party of New York chairman to create the "Coalition for a Better Buffalo", with the sole intention of identifying a candidate for the Democratic and Liberal party lines who could unseat Griffin. Following Cuomo's 1982 New York State Governors general election victory, Eve became critical of Cuomo's supply side approach to budget balancing, and was acknowledged by Cuomo as a voice of opposition which represented interests such as public housing. Eve also served as an adviser to Jesse Jackson during his 1984 presidential campaign, and after Jackson named his two delegates to the 1984 Democratic Party platform committee, he named Eve as his first alternate. In 1984, Eve was among those involved in a controversy over the use of a state plane to attend a dinner for Paterson. Questions arose about whether it was a community event or a political event due to the possibility that the funds raised at the dinner might be used for a Mayoral campaign. Even after Cuomo was succeeded by Pataki, Eve continued to voice opposition to any attempts to balance the state's budget by cutting taxes. In 1985, Eve sponsored legislation to provide scholarships for the underprivileged and to fund precollege enrichment programs that was described by President of the Associated Medical Schools of New York Dr. Robert Friedlander as landmark.

In 1986, Eve was a contender to replace Stanley Fink as Speaker of the New York State Assembly, but the Black and Puerto Rican Caucus was not unified in its efforts to endorse a candidate. Most minority assembly members voted for Brooklyn's Mel Miller due to the influence of downstate party organizers. Eve was outspoken in his opposition to the status quo; in 1988, he opposed all three incumbents for the New York State Board of Regents. In June 1988, Eve spearheaded a group of 12 black state ticket committee members who protested the absence of a black candidate on the state ticket of Cuomo, Stan Lundine and Herman Badillo, by voting for another candidate, but he was not joined in protest by Manhattan leaders David Dinkins and Herman Farrell. In November 1988, he was also among the few lawmakers to vote against the budget cuts and the first to call for a delay in their enactment. Eve's outspokenness occasionally attracted opposition to his own interests, as it did later that same year. During his 1988 re-election campaign, he encountered opposition from the minority ranks within the legislature, caused by his alleged involvement in the orchestration of a campaign against Queens, NY Democrat Cynthia Jenkins. As a result, she campaigned on behalf of Eve's opponent Dorsey Glover; Jenkins prevailed in her primary election. During the 1988 Democratic Party presidential primaries, Eve endorsed Jackson over Al Gore and Michael Dukakis. In 1993, he endorsed H. Carl McCall, the president of the New York City Board of Education, for New York State Comptroller in a race against Carol Bellamy, Fernando Ferrer, the Bronx Borough President, Assemblyman Robin Schimminger, and Joel Giambra. In both 1989 and 1993, Eve considered running for mayor. His wife opposed the 1989 campaign. In 1993, he felt he would have the opportunity to have a Buffalo Mayor he had a working relationship with if Anthony Masiello were to become mayor, and he, therefore declined to run so that he could endorse Masiello.

In 2000, Eve was challenged by Crystal Peoples-Stokes, a member of Grassroots and the majority leader of the Erie County Legislature. The race was described by The New York Times as the toughest election contest of Eve's political career. During the race, which was Eve's 18th and final New York State Assembly election campaign, Peoples depicted him as part of the antiquated old guard. Eve responded by summoning political connections including New York State Comptroller H. Carl McCall, United States Representative Charles B. Rangel, New York State Assembly Speaker Sheldon Silver, Representative Maxine Waters and his son Eric, who was a veteran New York State campaign manager. Peoples-Stokes's Democratic primary election challenge was almost successful, and it was credited with energizing minority voters to elect Byron Brown as a New York State Senator.

In 2000, Eve proposed that Pataki declare March 10 as Harriet Tubman day, in honor of the African-American abolitionist who helped bring about the emancipation of many slaves. In 2001 Eve began efforts to have the day declared a state holiday, but the legislation failed passage in the New York State Senate. Tubman had lived over 50 years in Auburn, New York, where the Harriet Tubman House is located. The movement to commemorate her spread to her birthplace state, Maryland. Eve continued his efforts in 2002, but the legislation did not pass until 2003, after his retirement.

=== Political themes ===
Eve is recognized as "a leader on just about every issue that's important to families", according to Al Gore, and for his services to the New York State Black and Puerto Rican Legislative Caucus, as well as to the committee of public officials who attempted to resolve the conflict at the Attica State Prison. Eve's major emphasis is on those at the very bottom of society; he believes that a nation should be judged by how it attends to the needs of its lowest citizens—the homeless, the chronically poor, and the working poor, among whom blacks are numbered disproportionately.

Eve campaigned for the increased availability of health care services. He legislated against hate crimes and advocated against the expansion of legalized gambling to casinos that would effectively tax the economically disadvantaged, although the gambling legislation was nevertheless approved. Eve noted that the vast majority of lottery tickets were bought by those in the lower income bracket, and advocated for greater representation in the New York State jury pools by the economically disadvantaged. He also urged restraint in banking deregulation.

== Retirement ==
New York State Senator George D. Maziarz has described Eve's retirement as a significant loss and an example of why he opposes term limits. A few months after retiring from political office Eve established a foundation whose first mission was to fight for the money allocated for the tutoring of students from underperforming schools, which was being redirected to other purposes. By 2004, New York State approved Eve's foundation to provide afterschool tutoring. He continued to serve on the Pataki task force that had been created in March 2001 to compensate family members of the 11 state workers killed in the 1971 Attica prison riots, and he remained active in discussions regarding the allocation of the state sales tax. In February 2008, the Brighter Choice Charter School for Boys in Albany dedicated its new conference hall in his honor.

In 2005, Eve's daughter Leecia announced her intention to run for Lieutenant Governor of New York in 2006. When Eliot Spitzer announced he had selected David Paterson to be his running mate for the 2006 New York State Elections, there was some controversy because Eve had been joined by Dinkins, Rangel, Percy Sutton and Basil Paterson (who is David Paterson's father) in endorsing his daughter.

In May 2023, Governor Kathy Hochul appointed Eve's daughter Leecia Eve as Chair of the Roswell Park Comprehensive Cancer Center Board of Directors.

== Notes ==
New York State Assembly
Preceded by Donald C. Shoemaker	New York State Assembly; 143rd District; 1967–1982	Succeeded by Dennis Gorski
Preceded by John B. Sheffer II	New York State Assembly; 141st District; 1983–2002	Succeeded by Crystal Peoples
Preceded by William F. Passannante	New York State Assembly; Deputy Speaker; 1979–2002	Succeeded by Clarence Norman Jr.
