= 1977 Buffalo mayoral election =

- November 8, 1977
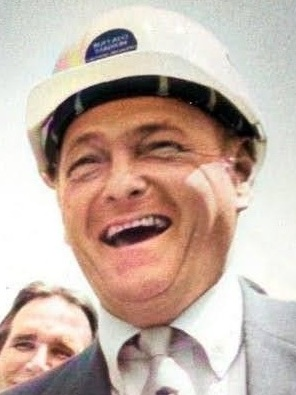

Nominee	Jimmy Griffin	Arthur Eve	John J. Phelan
Party	Conservative	Democratic	Republican
Popular vote	57,642	43,240	34,171
Percentage	41.97%	31.49%	24.88%
Mayor before election
Stanley Makowski
Democratic
Elected mayor
Jimmy Griffin
Conservative

The Buffalo mayoral election of 1977 took place in Buffalo, New York, USA, on November 8, 1977, and resulted in the election of Jimmy Griffin to his first term as mayor.

== Background ==
On March 3, 1977, Buffalo's incumbent mayor Stanley Makowski announced he would not seek reelection in May. On the same day, Deputy New York State Assembly speaker Arthur Eve announced his candidacy for the post. Despite his numerous successes at fostering communication, he was described as a militant civil rights leader. Eve's primary campaign was described by Frank Prial of The New York Times as a campaign against Erie County Democratic Committee Chairman Joseph F. Crangle rather than his handpicked candidate, Leslie Foschio. Eve declared his intentions early to add incentive to a voter registration drive, and he modeled his campaign after Carl Stokes' 1967 Mayor of Cleveland election, which used decentralized election districts. Later in the election cycle, State Senator Jimmy Griffin entered the Democratic Primary.

== Primary campaign ==
=== Democratic primary ===
Although Eve was expected to finish no better than third in the four-way race, he believed in a strategy to take 90 percent of the black vote and 10 percent of the rest. 30% of the 425,000 Buffalo residents were black at the time. His candidacy blossomed during four televised Democratic debates. Eve capitalized on Griffin's late campaign strategy of describing the Mayor job as simple like all jobs. Eve and his supporters supposedly registered 10,000 new black voters.

Eve became the first African-American to win the Democratic Party's Buffalo Mayoral Primary election. Eve won the primary for the Democratic nomination by a 25,538–23,579 (approximately 37%–34%) margin over Griffin.

The primary had had a voter turnout of 77–80% in the Black community, the highest ever for an African American community in the Northeast, and surpassed nationwide in terms of African American voter turnout only by the 1967 Mayor of Cleveland election of Carl Stokes.

== General election ==
Eve's victory brought out acts of racist aggression against him and his family, as a cross was burned on his front lawn and his family was subjected to threatening telephone calls.

After losing the primary Griffin became the Conservative Party's nominee; third-placed primary finisher Foschio also threatened to enter the general election. Eve was supported by Erie County Democratic Committee Chairman Joseph F. Crangle, who hoped to prevent a third Democrat, such as Foschio, from running in the general election by endorsing Eve publicly, but Eve campaigned without Crangle's backing or the Democratic Party's. Eve spurned Crangle's endorsement because he saw the endorsement as associating himself with the Crangle machine. He subsequently distanced himself from Crangle by announcing that he was not supporting the chairman's bid for re-election in 1978.

Griffin went on to win the general election by a ten percent margin over Eve, beating him and Republican candidate John J. Phelan.
