= 1993 Buffalo mayoral election =

- November 4, 1993

| Nominee | Anthony Masiello | Richard Grimm, III | Eugene Fahey |
| Party | Democratic | Republican | Conservative |
| Popular vote | 36,092 | 9,277 | 7,566 |
| Percentage | 68.18% | 17.53% | 14.29% |
Mayor before election
Jimmy Griffin
Democratic
Elected mayor
Anthony Masiello
Democratic

The Buffalo mayoral election of 1993 took place on November 4, 1993, and resulted in local politician Anthony Masiello winning a first term as mayor after Jimmy Griffin had resigned against two other opponents.
