= Alan J. Justin =

American politician (1938–2019)

Member of the New York State Assembly from the 146th district
- In office January 1, 1973 – December 31, 1974
- Preceded by: Francis J. Griffin
- Succeeded by: Dennis T. Gorski

Personal details
- Born: March 28, 1938 Buffalo, New York, U.S.
- Died: February 6, 2019 (aged 80) Elma, New York, U.S.
- Party: Republican

Alan J. Justin (born Juskiewicz; March 28, 1938 – February 6, 2019) was an American politician who served in the New York State Assembly from the 146th district from 1973 to 1974.

He died on February 6, 2019, in Elma, New York at age 80.
