= The First Pitch =

Statue of James D. Griffin in Buffalo, New York U.S.

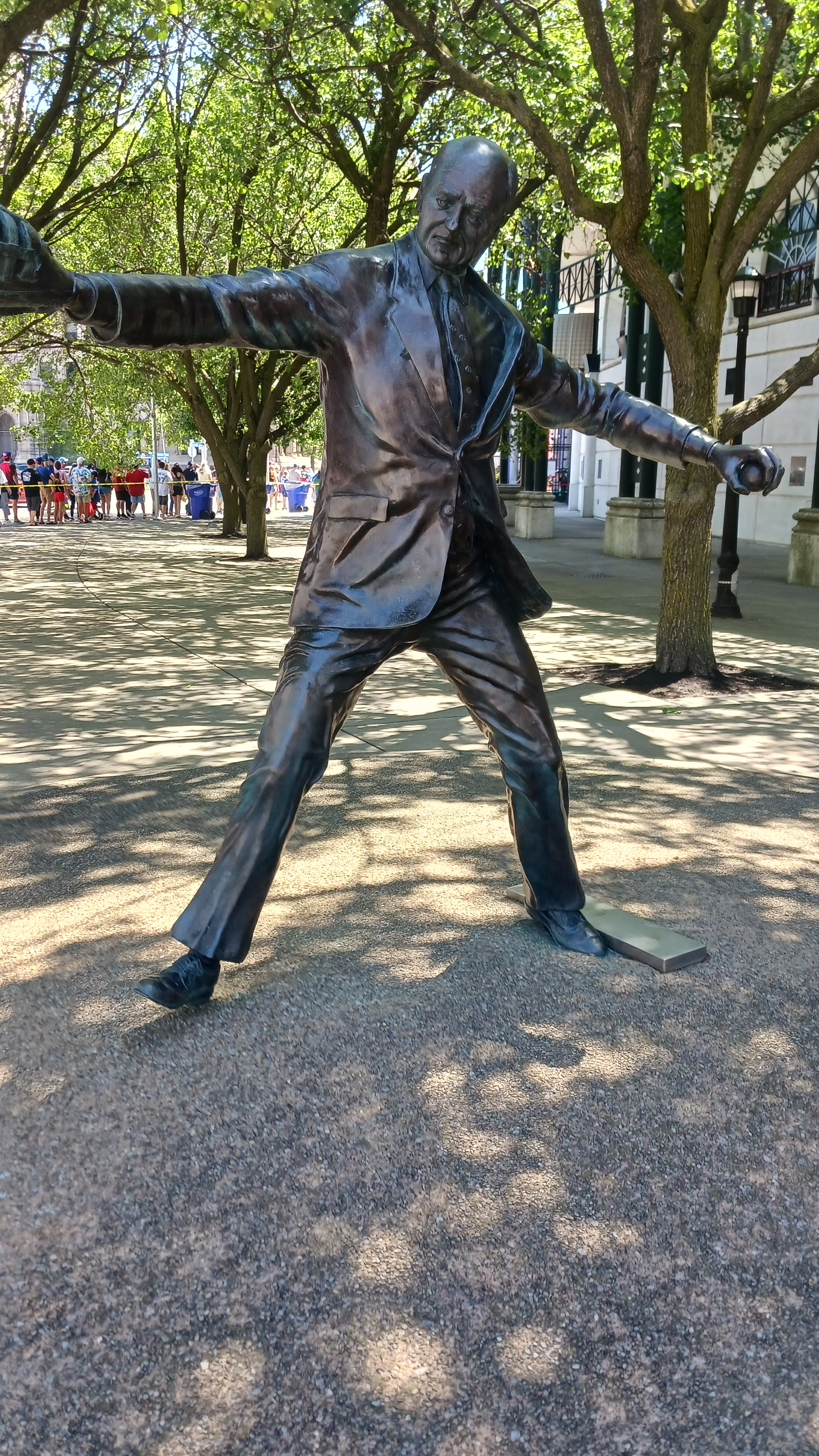
- The statue in 2026
- Artist: William Koch
- Year: 2012
- Medium: Bronze
- Location: Buffalo, New York; 42°52′53.09″N 78°52′28.54″W
- Owner: Buffalo Bisons

The First Pitch is a 2012 bronze statue of James D. Griffin, by William Koch. It is located at Swan Street and Washington Street, outside Sahlen Field in Buffalo.

Griffin, the former Mayor of Buffalo, was instrumental in getting Sahlen Field built and bringing the Buffalo Bisons franchise to the city while he was in office. Following his death in 2008, Griffin was posthumously honored by the Buffalo Common Council after they voted unanimously to change Sahlen Field's address to One James D. Griffin Plaza.

The work depicts Griffin throwing the ceremonial first pitch at Sahlen Field's inaugural game on April 14, 1988. It was dedicated on August 17, 2012.

== Gallery ==
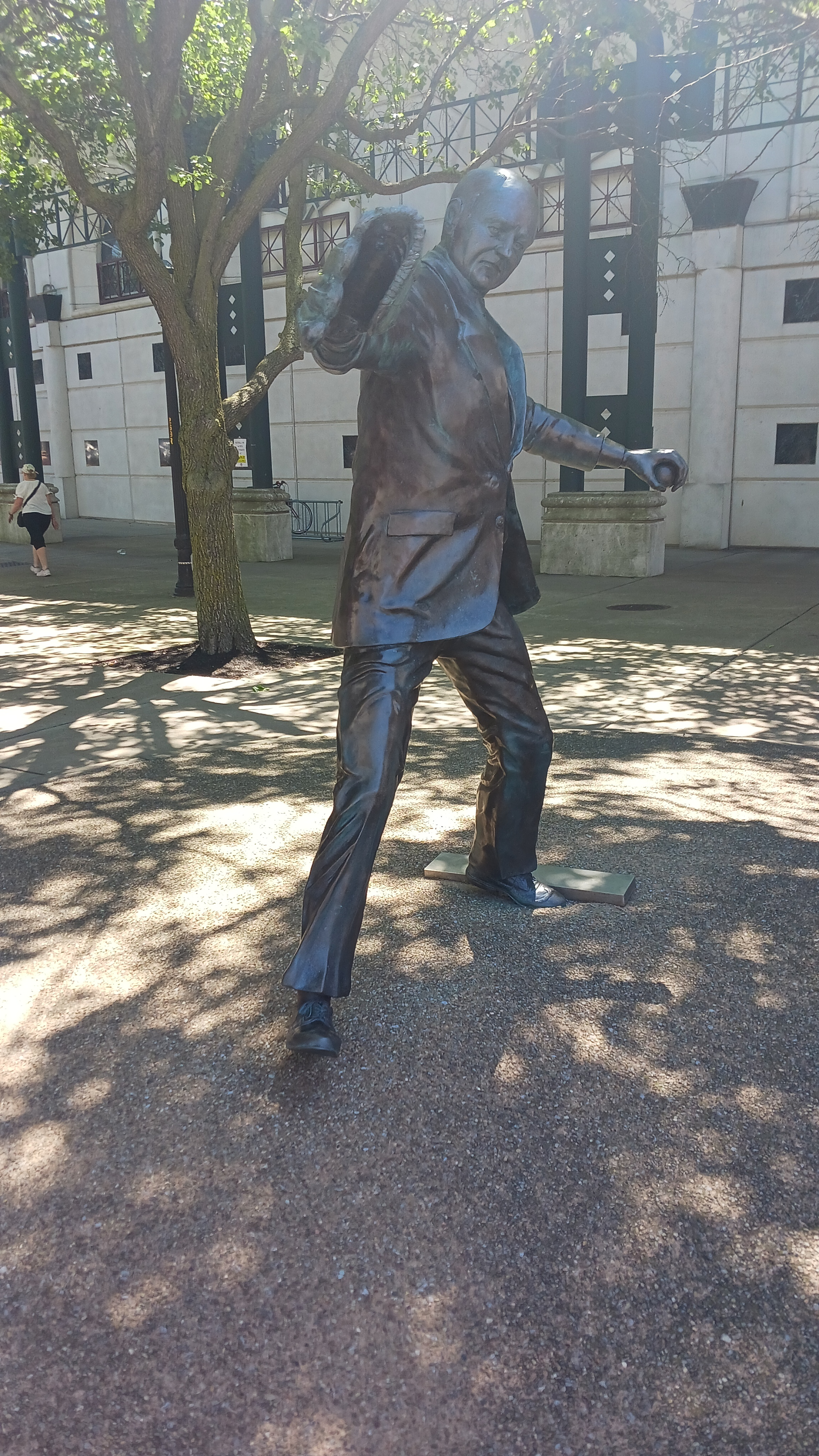
The statue with the pitcher's mound surrounding it

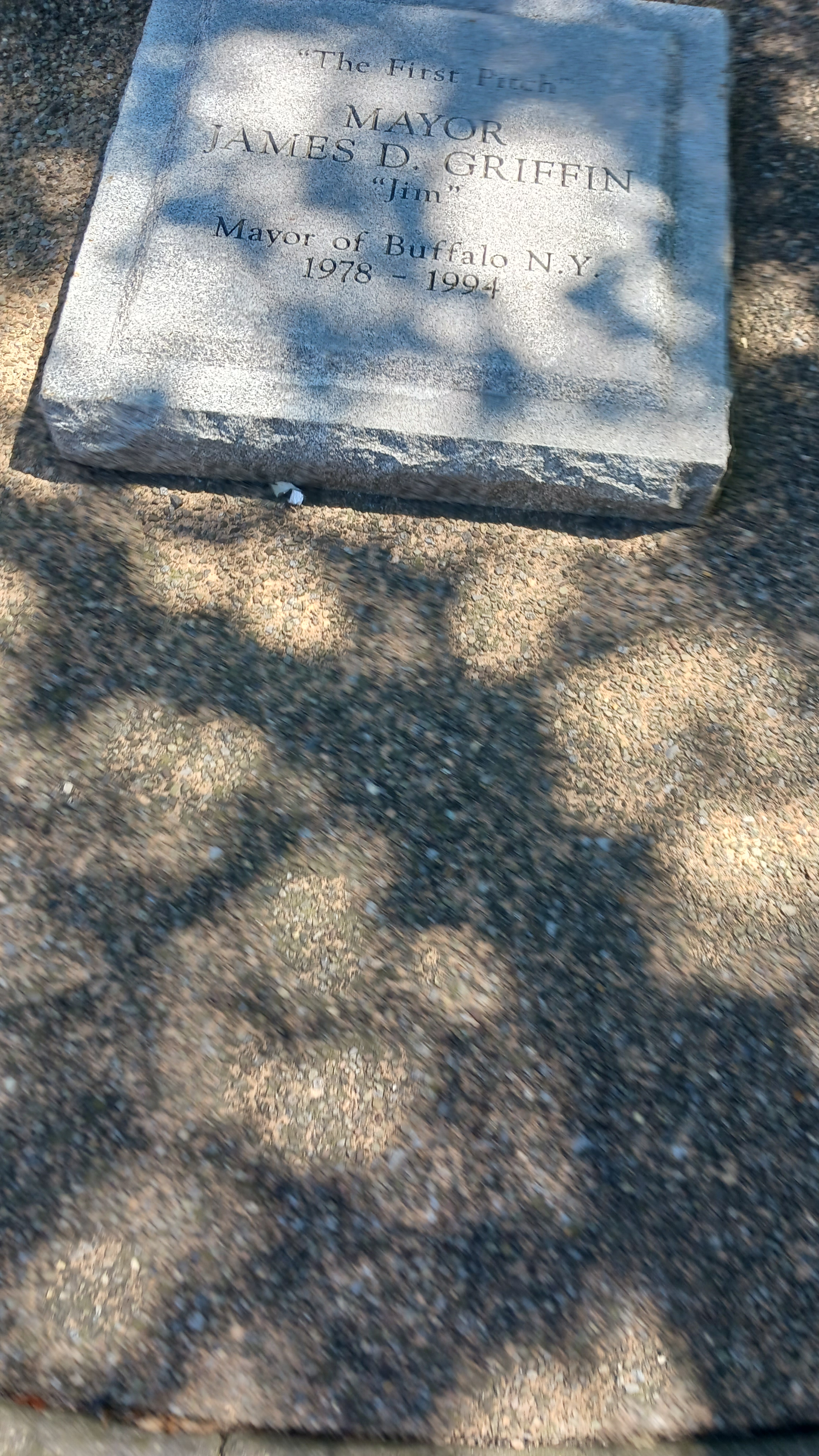
The stone plaque inscription that sits below the statue
