= 1985 Buffalo mayoral election =

- November 4, 1985
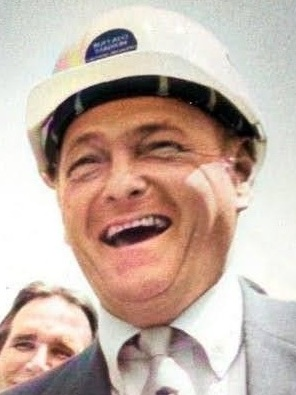

Nominee	Jimmy Griffin	George Arthur
Party	Republican	Democratic
Popular vote	69,851	56,479
Percentage	53.29%	43.09%
Mayor before election
Jimmy Griffin
Democratic
Elected mayor
Jimmy Griffin
Republican

The Buffalo mayoral election of 1985 took place on November 4, 1985, and resulted in the re-election of incumbent mayor Jimmy Griffin. Griffin lost the Democratic primary to local politician George K. Arthur but defeated Arthur in the general election after securing the Republican ballot line. This marks the last time that a candidate won the mayorship on the Republican line. It also marks the last time the Democratic nominee lost the general election until it happened again in 2021. Griffin won over his two opponents.
