= Paul Cambria =

American lawyer

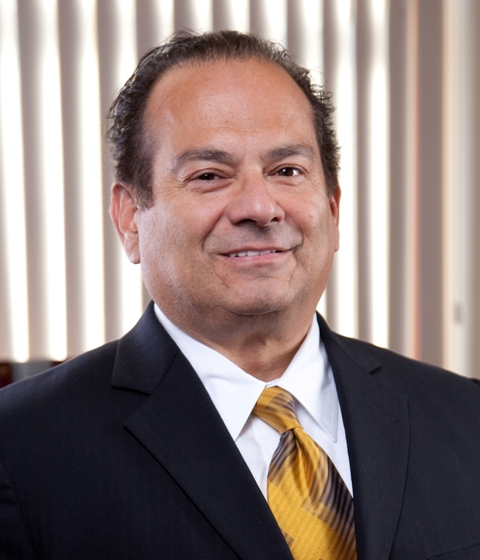
Paul J. Cambria, Jr. of Lipsitz Green Scime Cambria LLP

Paul J. Cambria, Jr. is an American criminal defense and appellate attorney, who has represented various figures and companies within the pornography industry as well as many prominent white collar defendants.

== Education ==
Cambria received his Juris Doctor degree from the University of Toledo College of Law in 1973. and a BA from the State University of New York at Fredonia in 1969.

== Career ==
A retired partner at the Buffalo-based law firm Lipsitz Green Scime Cambria, he practiced in the areas of Criminal Trials, Appeals, Constitutional Law, First Amendment, Zoning, Antitrust, and Professional Licensing Defense. His practice has been nationwide and he divided his time between the firm's offices in Buffalo and Los Angeles. He has represented nationally prominent figures including publisher Larry Flynt, musicians DMX and Marilyn Manson, Deputy A.J. Previty, NHL all-star Patrick Kane, and bio-artist Steve Kurtz, as well as local figures in Western New York such as Frank Parlato and Steve Pigeon.

Cambria is the past president of the New York state criminal defense lawyers' association and Past chair of the New York State bar Association criminal Justice section. He has argued before the United States Supreme Court. He is admitted to the bar in New York and California. D.C. and Pennsylvania.

== The Cambria List ==
After George W. Bush's 2000 election, there was concern within the pornography industry regarding possible future U.S. Justice Department prosecution over obscene material. In 2001, Cambria was commissioned by adult entertainment company Vivid Entertainment to create a list of sex acts that pornography film producers should avoid filming, in order to prevent possible legal problems with the U.S. government; it became known as "The Cambria List".

The PBS series Frontline in their 2002 program "American Porn" revealed some of the items on the list, which included fisting, facials, bukakke, anything other than very light bondage, gay sex, and acts involving transsexual people. As of 2019, the Cambria List is generally regarded as obsolete within the pornography industry.

== Personal life ==
As of 2019, Cambria is in negotiations to purchase Lancaster Speedway, a local stock car racing track.
