= 1997 Buffalo mayoral election =

Buffalo mayoral election 1997

- November 4, 1997
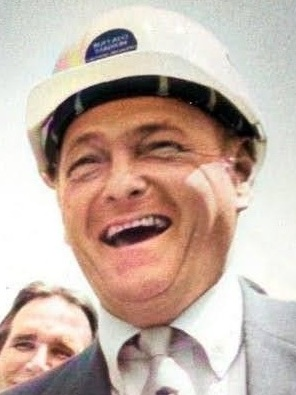

Nominee	Anthony Masiello	Jimmy Griffin	James Pitts
Party	Democratic	Right to Life	Liberal
Popular vote	42,223	16,539	11,424
Percentage	59.10%	23.15%	15.99%
Mayor before election
Anthony Masiello
Democratic
Elected mayor
Anthony Masiello
Democratic

The Buffalo mayoral election of 1997 took place on November 4, 1997, and resulted in incumbent mayor Anthony Masiello winning a second term over former mayor Jimmy Griffin and two other opponents.

== Results ==
1997 Buffalo mayoral election
Party	Candidate	Votes	%
Democratic	Anthony Masiello (incumbent)	42,223	59.10
Right to Life	Jimmy Griffin	16,539	23.15
Liberal	James Pitts	11,424	15.99
Conservative	Sharon Caetano	1,258	1.76
Turnout			100.00

== See also ==
- 1997 United States elections
