= Leecia Eve =

American lawyer (born 1964)

- Born: August 19, 1964 (age 62); Buffalo, New York, U.S.
- Education: Smith College (BA); Harvard University (MPA, JD)
- Political party: Democratic

Leecia Roberta Eve is an American attorney from New York with experience in federal government, state government, and the private sector who currently works as a lobbyist for telecommunications giant Verizon. Born in Buffalo, Eve was a candidate for Lieutenant Governor of New York during the 2006 election. After working for U.S. Sen. Hillary Clinton, Eve served as a senior advisor during Clinton's 2008 presidential campaign. From 2011 to 2013, she was Deputy Secretary for Economic Development in the Executive Chamber of New York Governor Andrew M. Cuomo. She was appointed to the Board of Commissioners of the Port Authority of New York and New Jersey in July 2017. Eve ran for Attorney General of New York in 2018, but was defeated in the Democratic primary.

== Background, education, and career ==
An African-American native of Buffalo, New York, Eve is the daughter of former Deputy Assembly Speaker Arthur Eve and Constance Eve.

Eve is a graduate of Smith College, The John F. Kennedy School of Government at Harvard University, and Harvard Law School. Following her law school graduation, she clerked for New York Court of Appeals Judge Fritz W. Alexander II. Eve eventually became a partner at the Hodgson Russ law firm, and also worked as an aide to U.S. Sens. Joseph Biden and Hillary Clinton. After working as Senate Counsel and Homeland Security Advisor to Clinton, Eve served as a senior policy adviser to during Clinton's 2008 primary campaign for President.

In January 2011, Eve was appointed by Governor Andrew Cuomo to serve as Senior Vice President of the Empire State Development Corporation (ESDC). In October 2011, Governor Cuomo appointed her to serve as his Deputy Secretary for Economic Development. On July 12, 2017, Eve was appointed by Gov. Cuomo to the Board of Commissioners of the Port Authority of New York and New Jersey.

As of August 2018, Eve is a Vice President of Government Affairs at Verizon.

Leecia serves as a member of the Roswell Park Comprehensive Cancer Center Board of Directors In May 2023, Governor Kathy Hochul appointed Eve Chair the Roswell Park Comprehensive Cancer Center Board of Directors.

She is a member of the Alpha Kappa Alpha sorority.

== Political campaigns ==
In 2005, Eve left Hillary Clinton's staff and announced her 2006 candidacy for Lieutenant Governor of New York. She received the endorsement of several Harlem political leaders, including Congressman Charles Rangel, former New York City Mayor David Dinkins, former Manhattan Borough President Percy Sutton, and former New York Secretary of State Basil Paterson. However, Attorney General and eventual Governor Eliot Spitzer instead selected State Senate Minority Leader David Paterson as his running mate.

David Paterson seriously considered Eve as a replacement for Clinton when Clinton resigned her U.S. Senate seat to become United States Secretary of State.

Eve was one of four candidates than ran in the 2018 Democratic primary for Attorney General of New York. She received the endorsement of the Albany Times Union. On September 13, 2018, Eve lost the Democratic primary for Attorney General to Letitia James, receiving 3.4% of the vote.
