= Grassroots (organization) =

Political organization in New York

- Formation: 1986
- Type: Political
- Region served: Western New York
- Official language: English

Grassroots is a political organization in Erie County, New York, which was founded in 1986 by a group of block club leaders, that is known for successful voter registration and elective placements such as Byron Brown in the Buffalo Common Council and Crystal Peoples in the Erie County Legislature. During its founding, organizers had gotten a map of Buffalo, New York's 437 election districts and found 29 candidates to obtain petition signatures to run for district committee slots. They won 16 positions.

They originally organized to seek attention for their neighborhood problems, but have grown into a larger cause. Statewide leaders such as United States Senator Charles Schumer speak glowingly of the group. Schumer once described it as "...one of the smartest, savviest political groups in the United States." Eliot Spitzer said, "I think that a candidate running in Buffalo or for statewide office would be remiss not to sit down with the leadership of Grassroots."

Brown eventually served as a vice president of the organization. By the mid-1990s, two Grassroots members were part of the City Council and Peoples had nearly defeated Arthur Eve, the longest-serving member of the New York State Assembly. Brown's New York State Senate victory confirmed the organization's appeal outside of Erie County. By 2003, its members included three Buffalo City Councilmen, a New York State Senator, and a New York State Assemblywoman. The organization is a largely African-American group dominated by younger activists founded to challenge State Assemblyman Arthur Eve's control over State funding to the Buffalo area.
