= Raymond F. Gallagher =

American politician

Raymond F. Gallagher (born April 7, 1939) is an American politician from Lackawanna, New York.

== Life ==
Born into an Irish American family, he entered politics as a Democrat. He was a member of the Erie County Legislature (1st D.) from 1972 to 1978; and was chairman from 1976 to 1978.

On February 14, 1978, he was elected to the New York State Senate, to fill the vacancy caused by the election of James D. Griffin as Mayor of Buffalo. Gallagher was re-elected twice, and remained in the Senate until 1981, sitting in the 182nd, 183rd and 184th New York State Legislatures. He resigned his seat in July 1981, and was appointed as Chairman of the Niagara Frontier Transportation Authority.

He was the Democratic nominee for New York State Comptroller in 1982.

Political offices
| Preceded by James D. Griffin | New York State Senate; 56th District; 1978–1981 | Succeeded by William Stachowski |
| Preceded by John C. Ogarek | 1st District Erie County Legislator; 1972-1978 | Succeeded by Marie Gannon |
Party political offices
| Preceded by Harrison J. Goldin; 1978 | Democratic nominee for New York State Comptroller; 1982 | Succeeded by Herman Badillo; 1986 |
