= Dennis Gorski =

American politician (1944–2021)

Dennis T. Gorski
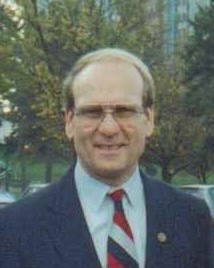
- Gorski in Buffalo, New York, 1991

5th Executive of Erie County
- In office January 1, 1988 – December 31, 1999
- Preceded by: Ed Rutkowski
- Succeeded by: Joel Giambra

Member of the New York State Assembly from the 146th, later the 143rd district
- In office 1975–1987
- Preceded by: Alan J. Justin
- Succeeded by: Paul Tokasz

Member of the Erie County Legislature from the 3rd District
- In office 1972–1974
- Preceded by: Frank C. Ludera
- Succeeded by: William Stachowski

Personal details
- Born: July 20, 1944
- Died: July 4, 2021 (aged 76) Cheektowaga, New York, U.S.
- Party: Democratic
- Spouse: Mary Jo (Craven)
- Children: 5 (two adopted) as of 1990
- Education: Le Moyne College, 1966

Military service
- Allegiance: United States
- Branch/service: United States Marines
- Years of service: 1967–1969
- Rank: Captain
- Unit: United States Marines
- Battles/wars: Vietnam War

Dennis T. Gorski (July 20, 1944 – July 4, 2021) was an American politician in New York and a Marine. A resident of Cheektowaga, New York, Gorski served as County Executive of Erie County, New York, which includes Buffalo and many of its suburbs. He was the first Democrat-elected Erie County Executive and the first Erie County Executive elected to three four-year terms. Gorski was an Erie County Legislator and a member of the New York State Assembly prior to three-term service as county executive. During his second term as County Executive, he ran for Congress to succeed Democrat Henry Nowak, but he was defeated in the general election by Republican Jack Quinn.

Like many Buffalo Democrats, including Buffalo mayors Anthony Masiello and James D. Griffin, Gorski was known for being more conservative than the mainstream Democratic Party platform, and was regularly cross-endorsed by the Conservative Party of New York. As county executive, he rivaled his contemporary Buffalo Mayors and on some issues his contemporary New York State Governors in power: He succeeded in bringing the World University Games to Buffalo, and since the National Football League's Buffalo Bills play in suburban Orchard Park, it was his responsibility to broker a deal to keep the team from leaving town. He also helped the National Hockey League's Buffalo Sabres finance Marine Midland Arena (now known as KeyBank Center). During his early years he brought about economic recovery and kept the county on solid financial footing during his tenure. He has been described as the only County Executive to balance the budget. Gorski was a Vietnam War veteran and remained active in veterans' affairs while in office.

After leaving the county executive's office, Gorski worked in private business in Buffalo, New York. He spent his first nine years of public life working for HealthNow (Parent company of BlueCross BlueShield of Western New York) and was subsequently hired by McCullagh Coffee Co. of Buffalo.

== Personal ==
Gorski was the son of Helen (Pieprzny) and Chester C. Gorski, a former Buffalo City Councilman and former member of the United States House of Representatives. His brother Jerome Gorski was a New York State Supreme Court judge. Gorski was raised in Buffalo's far east side in a Polish community where he served as an altar boy and played baseball and basketball. He was the starting catcher for the Roman Catholic Timon High School and later became a political activist at Le Moyne College in Syracuse, New York. Gorski earned a degree in English literature from Le Moyne in 1966. As of February 1990, he and Mary Jo had been married for 15 years. At that time, they had five children ranging in age from 1 to 7 with the oldest two adopted. When he served in the New York State Assembly, he shared a house with Assemblyman Richard J. Keane.

Gorski was a Buffalo Bills fan growing up, and he attended the first official game in franchise history at "The Rockpile" when he was 16 years old. It was an exhibition game against the Boston Patriots. He also attended the 1964 AFL season championship game. He followed the Bills while in Vietnam and as an Erie County Legislator he attended the 1972 groundbreaking ceremonies for Rich Stadium in Orchard Park, New York. He would eventually rise to be both a season ticket holder and the team's landlord, on behalf of the people of Erie County.

== Military career ==
During the Vietnam War Gorski volunteered to serve in the military "because he thought it was the right thing to do" even though he could have sought a graduate school deferment. Joining the United States Marine Corps, he attended Marine Officers Candidate School and was commissioned as a second lieutenant at Marine Corps Base Quantico in 1967. After this he was deployed to South Vietnam, beginning his tour of duty in December 1967. Initially he served as a platoon commander in a motor transport battalion stationed at Gia Le near Da Nang, under the command of Colonel Robert Reilly. While deployed, Gorksi took part in the Battle of Huế during the Tet Offensive, at which time his unit was employed largely in an infantry role. In April 1968, Gorski was the officer responsible for the night watch of battalion headquarters in Gia Le, when a People's Army of Vietnam (PAVN) assault breached the perimeter wire fence. During the skirmish that followed, Gorksi directed artillery and mortar fire. About a dozen PAVN soldiers were killed in the engagement, along with three Marines. In January 1969 Gorski returned to the United States, having risen to the rank of captain. He earned no medals for bravery, however, nor was he wounded.

== Political career ==
Gorski was a member of the Erie County Legislature from 1972 to 1974. He was a member of the New York State Assembly from 1975 to 1987, sitting in the 181st, 182nd, 183rd, 184th, 185th, 186th and 187th New York State Legislatures. In the Assembly, he chaired the Committee on Oversight, Analysis and Investigation from 1980 to 1984, and the Committee on Local Governments from 1984 to 1987. In 1984, Assemblyman Gorski co-sponsored legislation that amended state no-fault insurance laws in order to preserve the right to declare "loss of fetus" as a serious injury in an automobile accident. Previously, the laws were written such that this type of loss had been dismissed in the Appellate Division of the New York State Court in a suit brought by Jane Raymond for a 1978 accident. In 1985, he was selected to light the flame at the opening ceremony for the eighth annual Empire State Games. That year, he was among the Vietnam War veterans from New York State invited by tour consultants when Vietnam opened its economy to American tourists. Gorski, who was the only former officer on the trip, had secured state funding for the venture.

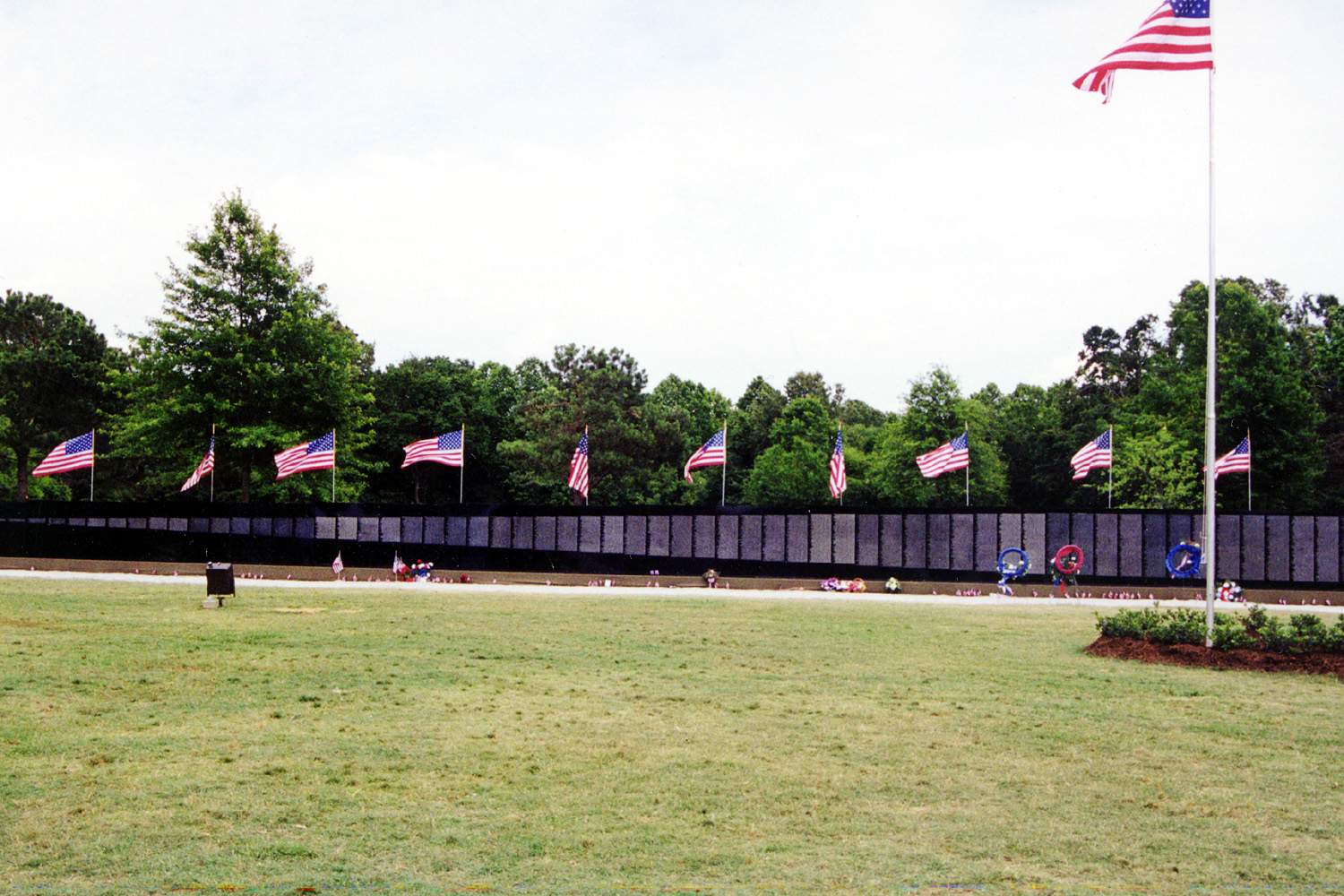
After Buffalo Mayor Griffin refused to accommodate The Moving Wall, Gorski availed, Chestnut Ridge Park, an Erie County park to host it

When Gorski ran for the Democratic nomination for Erie County Executive in 1987, Buffalo City Councilman James P. Keane had the support of the Erie County Democratic Committee and Joseph F. Crangle, but Gorski won the nomination in the September 15 primary election in what The New York Times described as an upset. In the general election, Gorski led in the polls against two-term incumbent Republican Edward Rutkowski, who had broken a campaign promise not to raise taxes, and he won the election by a two to one margin. He was the first Democrat ever elected Erie County Executive. Upon Gorski's assumption of office, he was met with the December 31, 1987 expiration of the temporary one percent increase in sales tax, and special governmental operations by New York State Governor Mario Cuomo were necessary to keep the county from losing revenues while awaiting reconvening of the New York State Legislature on January 6, 1988. After assuming office, Gorski was dissatisfied with Crangle's 23-year role as Erie County Democratic Committee Chairman and sought a new county party leader. Although people such as Governor Cuomo had previously attempted to unseat Crangle, it was not until a few months after Gorski exercised his influence that Crangle stepped down. After he became County Executive, Gorski was succeeded as the 143rd district representative in the New York State Assembly by Paul Tokasz in a March 1988 special election.

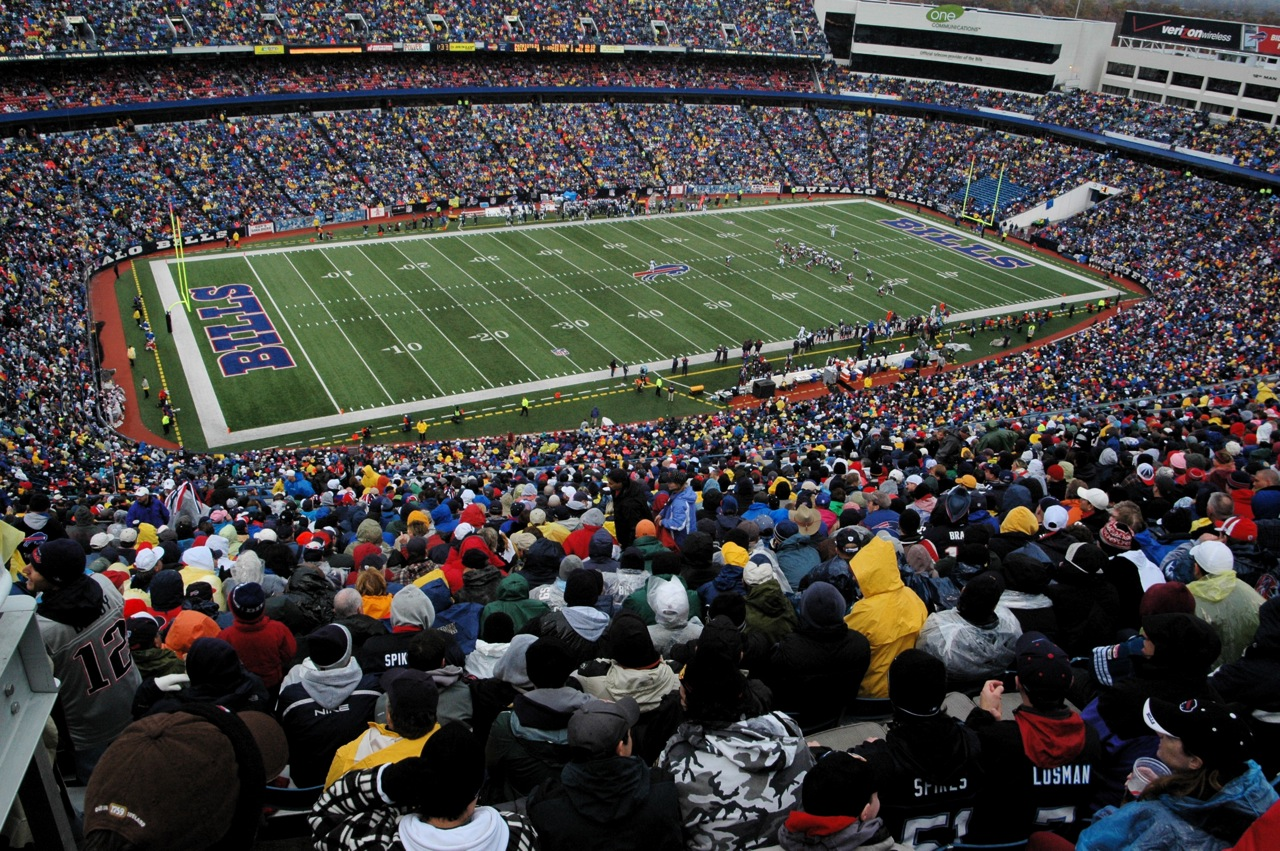
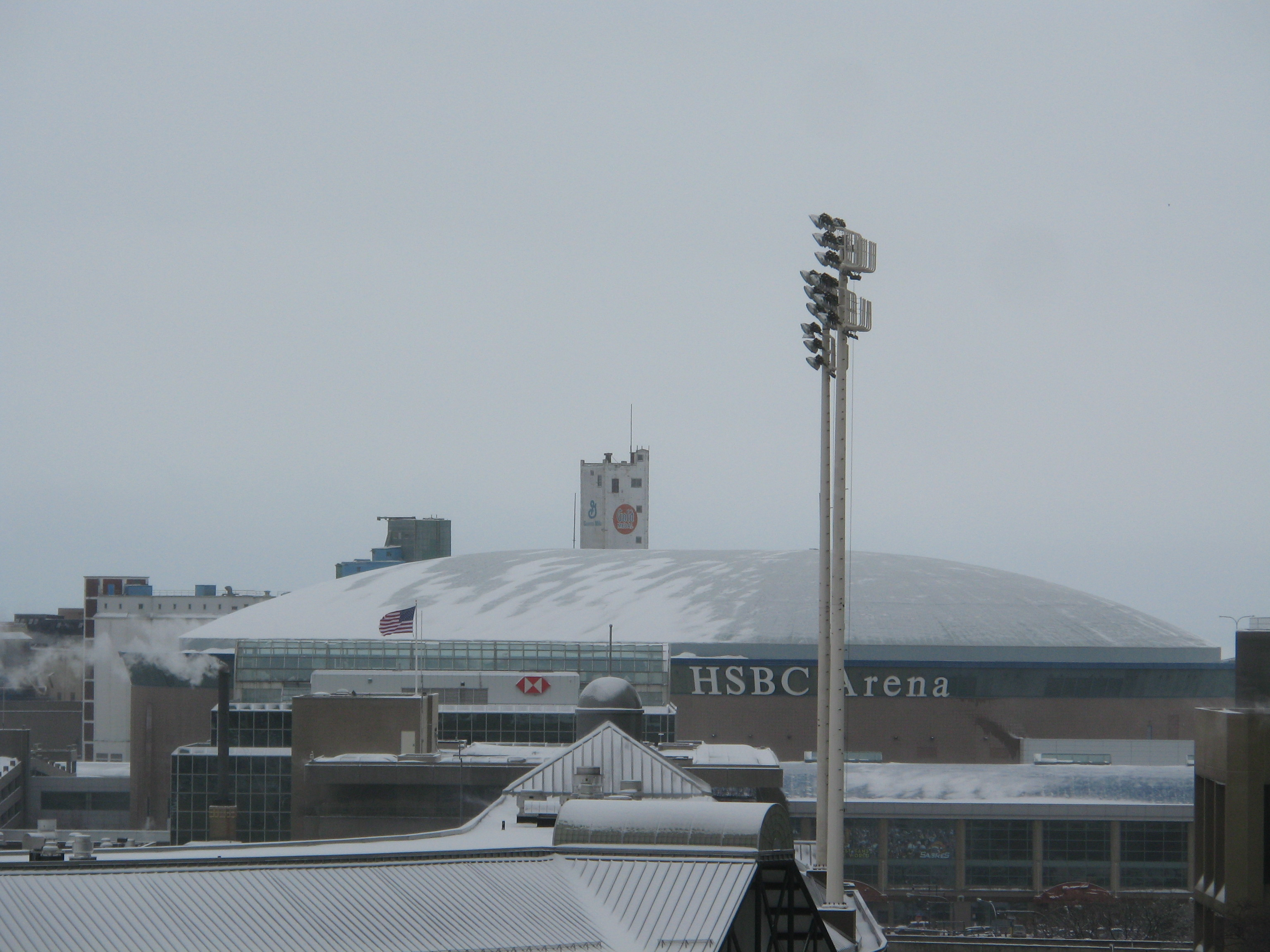
Gorski helped arrange deals for the Buffalo Bills and Sabres to remain in Buffalo at Ralph Wilson Stadium and HSBC Arena, respectively

As County Executive, Gorski would oppose Mayor Griffin several times. One of the first occurred in 1989 when Griffin ignored Vietnam veterans' request to use LaSalle Park to host The Moving Wall, a half-size replica of the Washington, D.C.'s Vietnam Veterans Memorial. Gorski made Chestnut Ridge Park, which is located 25 miles (40 km) south of Buffalo in Erie County, available to the veterans. A major crisis during his administration led to the threatened shutdown of the Niagara Frontier Transportation Authority bus and Light rail Buffalo Metro Rail subway service throughout Western New York. At the time, Buffalo was the smallest American city with a subway system and Alfred Savage had just resigned as executive director to assume that position with the Chicago Transit Authority. During Gorski's first term the local economy was revitalized: by March 1990, Buffalo's monthly unemployment rate fell below the state average for the first time in 11 years, and the region's job growth had outpaced the state average for its fourth consecutive year. The city was ranked by Fortune as one of the nation's top five growth communities. Gorski signed the controversial item pricing law in 1991, making Erie County one of the earliest counties to confirm the requirement that most supermarket products have price tags. By the time he ran for re-election for the first time, he was backed by both the County Democratic and Conservative parties, and he was challenged by fourth-term incumbent Mayor Griffin. Gorski handily won the Democratic nomination over Griffin by a 68–32 margin as well as the Conservative party nomination. Gorski handed Griffin the first general election defeat of his political career when the Mayor contested Gorski as the Republican Party and New York State Right to Life Party nominee. By the end of Gorski's first term, he had established himself as the most influential person in Western New York according to a report cited in The New York Times.

Gorski stood behind the effort to bring the 1993 World University Games to Buffalo

During Gorski's second term, one of the more unusual crises was the arrest of 194 anti-abortion protesters who mostly declined to post bail, which meant they were left in jail where the county was obligated to assume the costs for overtime and expenses associated with the arrests. In 1992, he ran against Republican Jack Quinn and Mary Refermat for Henry Nowak's seat in the United States House of Representatives to serve in the 103rd United States Congress. He was expected to win election to succeed Nowak in the New York's 30th congressional district. One reason for this expectation was that two of his recent predecessors were at the time in higher offices: New York State Comptroller Edward Regan and New York State Lieutenant Governor Stan Lundine. He lost the election however and Quinn went on to serve six terms.

In both 1992 and 1993, the Erie County Legislature was unable to agree to pass the extended 1 percent special sales tax for the county without Gorski threatening major county cutbacks. When Buffalo hosted the 1993 Summer World University Games, Mayor Griffin was very much against the idea, but Gorski was considered one of the Games' godfathers. He stood behind the effort to host the games even as it went beyond its budgeted costs. In 1994, Republican George Pataki defeated Democrat Mario Cuomo, causing a crisis for the Democratic Party. Gorski also arranged the deal to keep the Buffalo Sabres from moving by helping to build Marine Midland Arena.

Despite the troubles for the Democratic party in New York, Gorski defeated Republican Lucian J. Greco in his second re-election in November 1995. In 1997, the city of Buffalo was in such a financial plight that it considered merging itself into the county government. At the time, the Buffalo Bills were considering moving from the county-owned Ralph Wilson Stadium (then known as Rich Stadium) until they worked out a deal with the county. The stadium name change was part of the deal that was eventually finalized between Gorski, Pataki and Bills' owner Ralph Wilson in late 1998. In 1998, Gorski was named County Leader of the Year by American City & County magazine. Gorski was considered a contender for the Democratic nomination to challenge Pataki. In 1998, the Seneca nation filed suit that they were the rightful owners of Grand Island, New York, a 18,600-acre (75 km^{2}) island in the Niagara River with 17,000 residents, and all islands in the river. When Gorski ran for a third re-election, at first he was a wide underdog to Republican Joel Giambra, and it was the first time The Buffalo News, which was satisfied with Gorski's fiscal policies but was not impressed with his innovations, did not endorse him. By the final weekend before the election, Gorski had narrowed the gap among voters according to the polls. Gorski lost to Giambra, who had only recently switched from the Democratic to the Republican Party.

In March 2014, Gorski announced his candidacy for Cheektowaga Town Justice. On November 4, Gorski won the election. He served a four-year term and was not a candidate for re-election in 2018.

== Private life ==
After leaving the county executive's office, Gorski worked in private business in Buffalo. Gorski worked for HealthNow (Parent company of BlueCross BlueShield of Western New York) for nine years in a variety of capacities. At first he was hired as a consultant to BlueCross BlueShield of Western New York in January 2000. At the time there was much talk in local op-ed pages about the prospects of him serving as Superintendent of Buffalo Public Schools. He also consulted for the Upstate Medicare Division. By December 2000, he had been hired as a Vice President of HealthNow. He eventually became a senior vice president at HealthNow overseeing government affairs and lobbying, which made him responsible for government health programs, such as Medicaid, Medicare, Family Health Plus and Child Health Plus and earned him a 2007 salary of $398,302. Previously, Gorski was HealthNow's vice president of policy and representation. In February 2009 HealthNow laid off 17 employees, including Gorski and three other senior executives, during a restructuring. In July 2009, Gorski was hired by McCullagh Coffee Co. of Buffalo to help it negotiate government channels on many fronts—especially with its new "sustainable" coffee brands.

Gorski died at his home in Cheektowaga on July 4, 2021, from complications of Parkinson's disease at the age of 76.

== Notes ==
Political offices
Preceded by Arthur W. Hardie	3rd District Erie County Legislator; 1972–1974	Succeeded by William Stachowski
Preceded by Alan J. Justin	New York State Assembly; 146th District; 1975–1982	Succeeded by Francis J. Pordum
Preceded by Arthur O. Eve	New York State Assembly; 143rd District; 1983–1987	Succeeded by Paul Tokasz
Preceded by Ed Rutkowski	Erie County Executive; 1988–1999	Succeeded by Joel Giambra
