= Joel Giambra =

American politician

6th Executive of Erie County
- In office January 1, 2000 – December 31, 2007
- Preceded by: Dennis Gorski
- Succeeded by: Chris Collins

City Comptroller of Buffalo
- In office January 1, 1990 – December 31, 1999
- Mayor: Jimmy Griffin; Anthony Masiello
- Preceded by: Robert E. Whelan
- Succeeded by: Anthony Nanula

Member of the Buffalo Common Council from the Niagara district
- In office 1981–1989

Personal details
- Born: January 8, 1957 (age 69) Buffalo, New York, U.S.
- Party: Republican (1999–2022)
- Other political affiliations: Democratic (before 1999)
- Spouse: Michelle (Lettieri) Giambra
- Children: Gabriella, Nicholas, Dominic, Joel
- Education: Erie Community College

Joel Giambra is an American politician from the State of New York. He is the former County Executive of Erie County, New York.

== Early life ==
Giambra was born in Buffalo, New York in 1957 to a single mother, Shirley. He was raised in Buffalo by his mother and his grandmother. He lived in the Lakeview Housing Project, near the east bank of the Niagara River. Giambra later said, "It was an environment where everybody was poor but we didn’t know it." His mother eventually married Salvatore "Babe" Panaro. Giambra considers Panaro to be his father. His mother and stepfather had a daughter, Angela. The family is Roman Catholic.

Giambra attended Grover Cleveland High School and Erie Community College.

== Political career ==
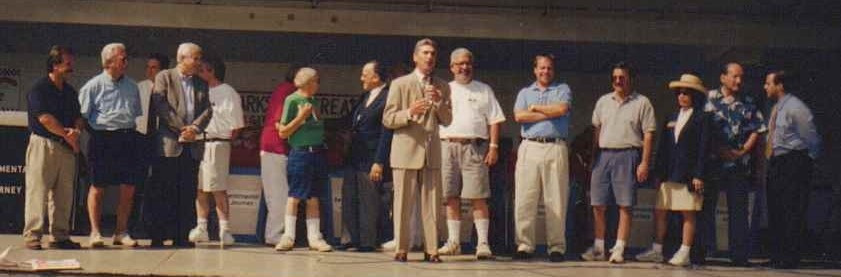
Joel Giambra (at center in beige suit) speaking at Italian Festival, Buffalo, NY, 2000

Giambra was one of the youngest Buffalo Common Council members ever, and also served as Buffalo City Comptroller early in his career. He was a Democrat who changed his political affiliation to Republican in 1999 to better position himself to run for County Executive, later breaking ties with the Republican Party in 2023. He was seen as a future statewide candidate and in 2002 was considered by Governor George Pataki as a running mate for lieutenant governor, before Lt. Gov. Mary Donohue was nominated for reelection.

Investigations into the mismanagement of a highway garage and exorbitant prices paid for county office furniture to a Giambra campaign contributor preceded the 2005 budget problems. Then-New York Attorney General Eliot Spitzer initiated a lawsuit against the furniture company for the overcharges. Some have accused Giambra of providing lucrative jobs to associates. His county staff measured 18, while Monroe County's executive had only four staffers and then downsized to three. Giambra's boyhood friend Victor Getz was particularly singled out for notice, for his salary as an executive assistant and driver to Giambra. A panel appointed by Giambra found that Giambra's and other county employees' salaries should be raised by 40%.

Giambra lowered or declined to raise county taxes for years for a total of 31% lower taxes, financing his budget partly through the use of surpluses from the previous county administration and monies from the tobacco settlement. The county then had to accept either massive reductions of services or increases in taxation. Giambra said that "an end to county government as we know it" would occur without a sales tax hike, ending county libraries, snowplows and road patrols.

Giambra proposed this "red budget" of $940 million which eliminated services, and after failed negotiations to raise the sales tax in a "green budget" of $1 billion, a modified plan was adopted which laid off 2,000 county employees and closed many county services, including the Parks Department. In 2005, a Control Board was implemented by the state to monitor county finances.

In April 2006, Giambra said that the "War on Drugs" was being lost and models used successfully in other countries of decriminalizing certain drugs and thus reducing violence associated with the illegal drug trade needed to be examined. The Buffalo News published an Op-Ed agreeing with Giambra's statements that drug legalization should be studied further.

Since 2012, Giambra has been the co-host of the political debate program 2 Sides on WGRZ.

In 2018, Giambra announced he was a candidate for the Republican nomination for Governor of New York Giambra described himself as a "socially moderate" Republican, a supporter of campaign finance reform, and an opponent of corporate welfare. Conservative Party Chairman Michael R. Long "flatly reject[ed] Giambra who...[has made] significant donations to [Democrats such as] [Gov. Andrew] Cuomo, Assembly Speaker Carl E. Heastie, New York Mayor Bill de Blasio and 2016 presidential nominee Hillary Clinton [and supports] abortion rights, same sex marriage, gun control and marijuana legalization." After failing to generate support from Republicans, Giambra withdrew his name as a Republican candidate on March 1 and instead sought the nomination of the Reform Party of New York State. Giambra later asserted that the Conservative Party was "an albatross...around the neck of the Republican Party." After the Reform Party deadlocked between Giambra and presumptive Republican nominee Marc Molinaro in its first attempt at nominating a candidate, delegates at the Reform Party state convention nominated Molinaro for governor on May 19, 2018.

On July 6, 2022, Giambra announced via Twitter that he was leaving the Republican party, stating "Friends and supporters: After careful thought and consideration, I have decided that I can no longer remain a Republican or continue with my campaign to seek the Republican nomination for Senator in the 61st District. I cannot stand with party leaders who double down in their support of the NRA after yet another mass shooting; who applaud the decision to take away a woman's right to choose & who encourage the elimination of LGBTQ rights; & who still believe that Donald Trump is their president."

== Personal life ==
Giambra married Michelle Lettieri in 1982, and they have four children, Gabriella, Nicholas, Dominic, and Joel.

Giambra experienced throat cancer and kidney failure in 2020, but later recovered, following a kidney donation from a former constituent.

Political offices
Preceded by Robert E. Whelan	Buffalo City Comptroller; 1990 – 1999	Succeeded by Anthony Nanula
Preceded by Dennis Gorski	Erie County Executive; 2000 – 2007	Succeeded by Chris Collins
