= William Stachowski =

American politician

William T. Stachowski
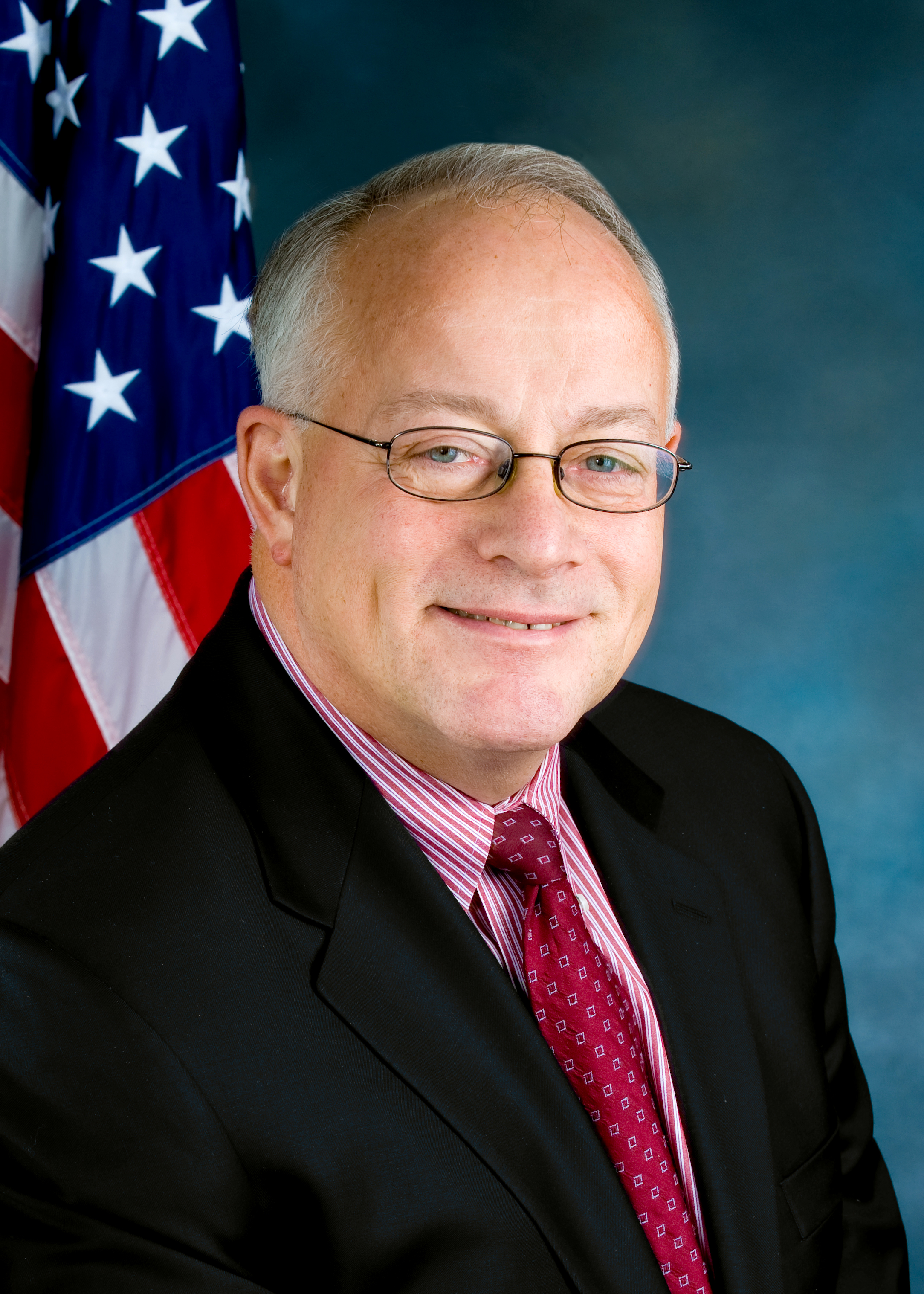

Member of the New York Senate
- In office December 3, 1981 – December 31, 2010
- Preceded by: Raymond F. Gallagher
- Succeeded by: Tim Kennedy
- Constituency: 56th district (1981-1982); 57th district (1983-1992); 58th district (1993-2010)

Member of the Erie County Legislature from the 3rd district
- In office 1975–1981
- Preceded by: Dennis Gorski
- Succeeded by: Barry L. Robinson

Personal details
- Born: February 14, 1949 (age 77) Buffalo, New York, U.S.
- Party: Democratic
- Other political affiliations: Working Families

William T. Stachowski (born February 14, 1949) is an American politician from New York.

== Biography ==
Stachowski attended Bishop Ryan High School in Buffalo, New York. He graduated from the College of the Holy Cross in Worcester, Massachusetts, where he played Varsity Football. He was All New England and won the Davitt award as the Holy Cross best defensive player. He entered politics as a Democrat, and was a member of the Erie County Legislature (3rd D.). In November 1981, he was elected to the New York State Senate, to fill the vacancy caused by the resignation of Raymond F. Gallagher, and took his seat during a special session on December 3, 1981.

He was re-elected many times, and remained in the Senate until 2010, sitting in the 184th, 185th, 186th, 187th, 188th, 189th, 190th, 191st, 192nd, 193rd, 194th, 195th, 196th, 197th and 198th New York State Legislatures.

Stachowski chaired the Commerce, Economic Development and Small Business Committee. This committee works closely with the Empire State Development Corporation. Stachowski also sat on the Public Authorities Control Board and the Legislative Commission on the Development of Rural Resources. He was also a member of the Upstate Caucus

On December 2, 2009, Stachowski was one of eight Democratic state senators to vote against legislation which would legalize same-sex marriage in New York. This legislation would fail to pass the Senate.

He worked closely with SUNY Buffalo President John B. Simpson to carry out the UB 2020 plan. Stachowski sponsored and passed legislation in support of UB 2020 in the Senate. In 2010, he ran for re-nomination, but was defeated in the Democratic primary by Erie County Legislator Tim Kennedy. Kennedy went on to win the general election.

Political offices
Preceded by Dennis T. Gorski	3rd District Erie County Legislator; 1975-1981	Succeeded by Barry L. Robinson
Preceded by Raymond F. Gallagher	New York State Senate; 56th District; 1981–1982	Succeeded by Jess J. Present
Preceded by Jess J. Present	New York State Senate; 57th District; 1983–1992	Succeeded by Anthony M. Masiello
Preceded by Anthony M. Masiello	New York State Senate; 58th District; 1993–2010	Succeeded by Timothy M. Kennedy
Preceded by James Alesi	New York State Senate; Chairman of the Senate Committee on Commerce, Economic Development and Small Business; 2009–2010	Succeeded by James Alesi
