= Joseph F. Crangle =

Political power broker in Western New York (1932–2021)

Joseph F. Crangle (June 12, 1932 – January 12, 2021) was a lawyer and political boss in Erie County, New York. Crangle served overlapping terms as chair of the Erie County Democratic Committee from 1965 to 1988 and chair of the New York State Democratic Committee from 1971 to 1974.

Crangle was the longest-serving chairman of the Erie County Democratic Committee, the political party and political machine that during his term came to dominate the politics of Buffalo, New York and its suburbs. He was a key backer of Frank A. Sedita as mayor and opponent of James D. Griffin.

Anthony Masiello recalled getting his start in politics through Crangle.

== Campaigner ==
Wesley Barthelmes, press secretary to Robert F. Kennedy, recalled Crangle and his predecessor Erie County's Peter Crotty as among the few Democratic insiders to support Robert F. Kennedy's run in the 1964 United States Senate election in New York. Crangle later served on RFK's 1968 Presidential campaign in Michigan.

In 1976, Crangle served as the chairman of for Senator Daniel Patrick Moynihan's campaign.

He joined Ted Kennedy's presidential campaign against Jimmy Carter.
