= Stanley Makowski =

American politician (1923–1981)

Stanley M. Makowski
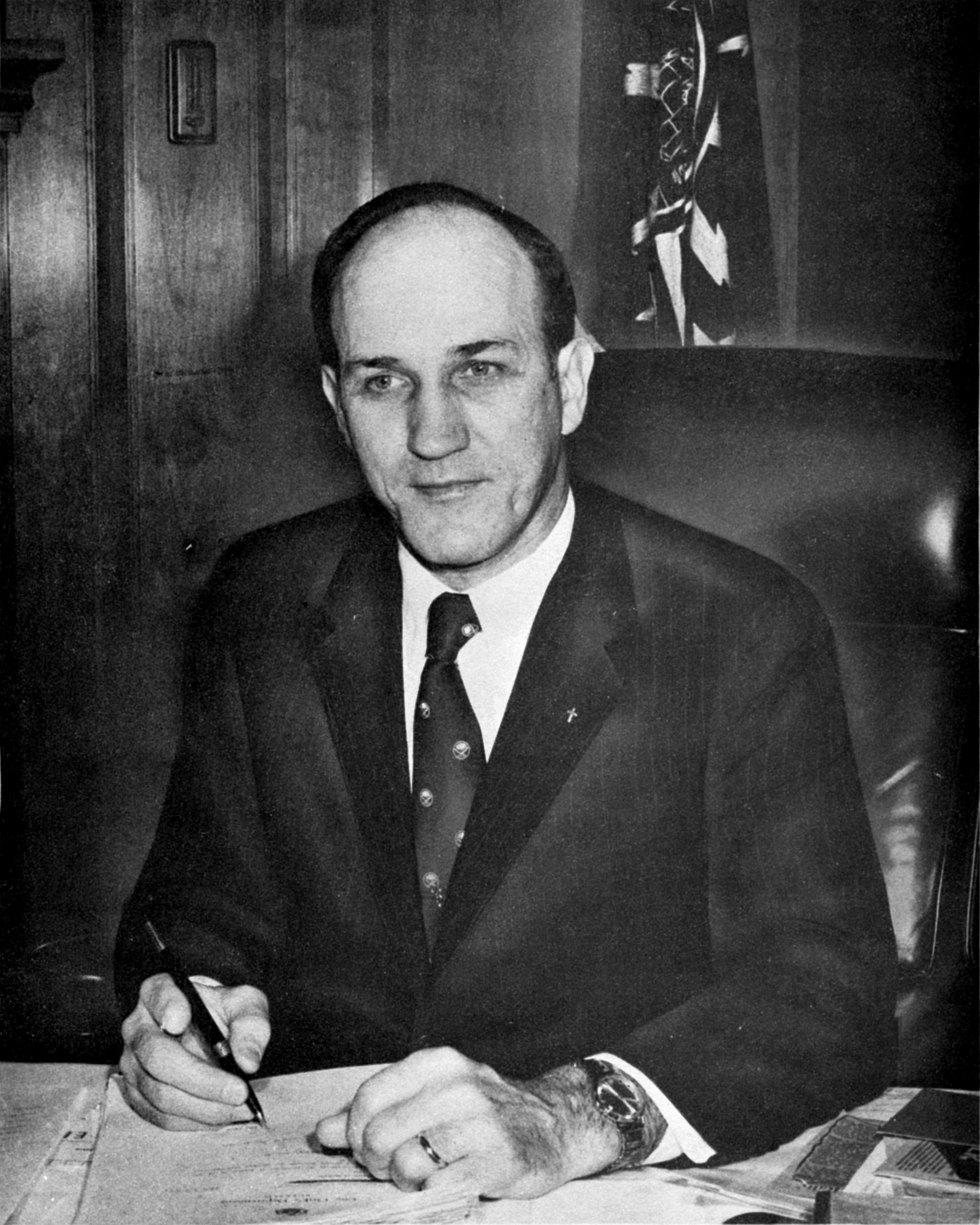

59th Mayor of Buffalo
- In office March 5, 1973 – December 31, 1977
- Preceded by: Frank A. Sedita
- Succeeded by: James D. Griffin

Personal details
- Born: April 22, 1923 Buffalo, New York, U.S.
- Died: August 5, 1981 (aged 58) Buffalo, New York, U.S.
- Party: Democratic
- Spouse: Florence Ziolo (m. 1954)
- Children: 8

Stanley M. Makowski (April 22, 1923 – August 5, 1981) was Mayor of the City of Buffalo, New York, serving 1974–1977.

== Early life ==
He was born in Buffalo on April 22, 1923, as the younger of two children of Polish immigrants. He dropped out of Hutchinson Central High School and served six months with the Civilian Conservation Corps. In 1943, he joined the Army and served three years during World War II, including an eight-month tour on Iwo Jima. After the war, he earned his high school diploma and attended Cornell University, where he received a certificate from the New York State School of Industrial and Labor Relations, and night school at Millard Fillmore College at the University of Buffalo.

== Career ==
In 1959, he accepted appointment to the at-large seat on the Common Council, when Thaddeus J. Dulski was elected to the State Senate. In 1969, Makowski ran as the Democratic candidate for Erie County executive; he was defeated in the general election by B. John Tutuska. In 1972, the Common Council created the post of deputy mayor and Makowski was the first appointed, serving under Mayor Frank A. Sedita. Upon Mayor Sedita's resignation of March 5, 1973, Makowski became mayor. He was elected as mayor on November 6, 1973. During his term, the Buffalo Convention Center was constructed, as was the Marine Midland Center. On January 28, 1977, a most disastrous blizzard struck Buffalo and Western New York. He served just one term as mayor (in addition to the final 10 months of Mayor Sedita's 3rd term).

== Personal life ==
He married Florence Ziolo on August 7, 1954. He died on August 5, 1981, and was buried in St. Stanislaus Cemetery in Cheektowaga, New York.

Political offices
Preceded by Frank A. Sedita	Mayor of Buffalo, NY; 1974–1977	Succeeded by James D. Griffin
