= James D. Griffin =

American politician (1929–2008)

- Griffin in 1986

60th Mayor of Buffalo
- In office January 1, 1978 – December 31, 1993
- Preceded by: Stanley M. Makowski
- Succeeded by: Anthony Masiello

Member of the Buffalo Common Council
- In office 1962–1965
- Constituency: Ellicott District
- In office 2003–2005
- Preceded by: Mary Martino
- Succeeded by: Jeffrey M. Conrad
- Constituency: South district

Member of the New York Senate from the 56th district
- In office 1967–1977
- Preceded by: William T. Smith
- Succeeded by: Raymond F. Gallagher

Personal details
- Born: James Donald Griffin; June 29, 1929 Buffalo, New York, U.S.
- Died: May 25, 2008 (aged 78) Buffalo, New York, U.S.
- Party: Democratic
- Other political affiliations: Right to Life (1997); Republican (1985); Conservative (1977)
- Spouse: Margaret McMahon
- Children: 3

Military service
- Allegiance: United States
- Branch/service: United States Army
- Battles/wars: Korean War

James Donald Griffin (June 29, 1929 – May 25, 2008) was an American politician who served in the New York State Senate (56th District, 1967–77) and then for 16 years as the Mayor of Buffalo, New York (1978–93). He later returned to public life serving as a member of the Buffalo Common Council.

== Early life ==
Griffin, an Irish American, hailed from South Buffalo, the son of Helen (O'Brien) and Thomas Griffin. He served in the United States Army during the Korean War.

Griffin was a registered Democrat during his political career. However, he was very conservative compared to the party platform, especially on social issues. He was frequently cross-endorsed by the Conservative and Republican parties. He was a Buffalo city councilman in the 1960s.

He was a member of the New York State Senate from 1967 to 1977, sitting in the 177th, 178th, 179th, 180th, 181st, and 182nd New York State Legislatures.

== Mayor of Buffalo ==
Griffin was elected mayor of Buffalo in November 1977, and was sworn in on January 1, 1978. He had lost the Democratic primary for mayor to then Deputy State Assembly Speaker Arthur Eve. In the general election, he was the nominee of the Conservative Party and defeated Eve to be elected mayor. He was reelected in 1981, 1985, and 1989.

As mayor, Griffin was sometimes known for his outspoken personality. During a January 1985 blizzard, he recommended to Buffalo residents "go home, buy a six pack of beer, and watch a good football game." This earned him the nickname "Jimmy Six Pack", and the moniker "Six-Pack Storm" for the blizzard.

While mayor, he was the unsuccessful Republican nominee for Erie County executive in 1991, losing to incumbent Dennis Gorski. In 1996, Griffin sought the Democratic nomination for president in the New Hampshire primary, finishing a very distant eighth to Bill Clinton. After the "Spring of Life" demonstration in April 1992 where Griffin encouraged pro-life groups such as Operation Rescue to protest in Buffalo, he declined to seek a fifth term as mayor and was succeeded by Democrat Anthony Masiello.

== Postmayoral career ==
Griffin remained as outspoken and controversial as a former mayor as he was during his career in City Hall. He frequently commented on public policy issues in Buffalo. He ran again for Mayor in the 1997 election, running on the Right to Life line and losing to Masiello. He then unsuccessfully sought a seat in the New York State Assembly against future Congressman Brian Higgins (where Griffin was defeated in his home base of South Buffalo for the only time in his electoral career) and was rumored to have an interest in a seat in the Erie County Legislature that was vacated in 2001, although in the end he did not run. In 2002, he led an effort to recall Masiello from office. This effort fell through because of petition discrepancies and disputes over whether a recall election was legal in New York State.

In 2003, Griffin was elected to a two-year term in the Buffalo Common Council, representing the South District. Taking office in 2004, Griffin was named Chairman of the Claims Committee and started working on fiscal issues relating to the Buffalo fiscal crisis. He also criticized Masiello's handling of city finances. Griffin focused much of his time on issues in his district.

In the spring of 2005, Griffin resigned from the council with several months left in his term. He said he had completed what he sought to accomplish as a councilman and was retiring from public life.

On January 28, 2007, during an interview on the Hardline with Hardwick radio program on Buffalo radio station WBEN, Griffin said he might once again run for Erie County Executive as a Democrat. The County Executive at that time, Joel Giambra, had announced he would not be seeking re-election. Then on April 15, 2007, he announced on WWKB's "Public Opinions with Wayne Mack" that he had discussed running again with his wife, and decided he did not wish to seek public office anymore.

However, on July 17, 2007, Griffin announced that he was joining the race for the Erie County Executive seat, against fellow South Buffalonian and endorsed Democratic Party candidate Jim Keane. Griffin was correctly considered an underdog and did not have much—if any—money with which to run a campaign. When the votes were counted after the primary on September 18, 2007, Griffin ran 3rd in a three-way race with about 23% of the vote. He ran his campaign with only $11,000.00 against the millions his opponents spent on their campaigns. Griffin then said he had run his last electoral race and considered himself retired from political competition. Griffin later endorsed the candidacy of Republican candidate and with the assistance of his group of campaign volunteers, helped Christopher C. Collins win the election for Erie County Executive.

== Personal life, death, and legacy ==
Griffin died on May 25, 2008, at the Father Baker Manor in Orchard Park, from Creutzfeldt–Jakob disease. His wife, Margaret "Margie" Griffin (née McMahon), died in July 2011. The couple had three children: Maureen, Megan, and Tom.

Following his death, the Buffalo Common Council voted to rename the address of Sahlen Field to One James D. Griffin Plaza in his honor.

A bronze sculpture of Griffin titled The First Pitch by artist William Koch was erected outside Sahlen Field in 2012 to honor Griffin's contributions in bringing the ballpark and professional baseball to Buffalo.

Until Byron Brown swept his opponent to win a record 5th term in 2021, Griffin was the longest-serving mayor of Buffalo, and from January 3, 2021 until December 31, 2021, he shared this title with Brown, but at midnight on January 1, the tie was broken.

New York State Senate
Preceded by William T. Smith	New York State Senate; 56th District; 1967–1977	Succeeded by Raymond F. Gallagher
Political offices
Preceded by Stanley M. Makowski	Mayor of Buffalo, New York; 1978–1993	Succeeded by Anthony Masiello
