= Anthony Masiello =

American politician (born 1947)

61st Mayor of Buffalo
- In office January 1, 1994 – December 31, 2005
- Preceded by: James D. Griffin
- Succeeded by: Byron Brown

Member of the New York State Senate from the 55th district
- In office 1981–1993
- Preceded by: Joseph A. Tauriello
- Succeeded by: Anthony Nanula
- Constituency: 55th district (1981-1982); 58th district (1983-1992); 57th district (1993)

Personal details
- Born: April 28, 1947 (age 79) Buffalo, New York, U.S.
- Party: Democratic
- Spouse: Kathleen McCue
- Children: 3
- Education: Canisius College

Anthony M. Masiello (born April 28, 1947) is an American politician and former basketball player who served as the mayor of Buffalo, New York, from 1994 to 2005. Prior to being mayor, he served as a member of the New York State Senate. He is currently president of Masiello, Martucci and Associates, a Buffalo-based lobbying firm.

== Early life and education ==
A Buffalo native, Masiello is the oldest of seven children born to Bridget and Dan Masiello. Masiello graduated from Canisius College in 1969, where he played as a member of the Canisius Golden Griffins men's basketball team. He was then drafted by the Indiana Pacers in the 1969 ABA draft, but was cut from the roster before the season.

== Career ==
In 1971, Masiello began his career in politics when he was elected to represent North District on the Buffalo Common Council. He was subsequently elected to an at-large seat on the council and served as Democratic Majority leader in 1976. He also served as Chairman of the Council Finance Committee.

Masiello was a member of the New York State Senate from 1981 to 1993, sitting in the 184th, 185th, 186th, 187th, 188th, 189th and 190th New York State Legislatures. Masiello's Senate district originally comprised mainly Buffalo and other parts of Erie County, New York. During the final year of his Senate service, his district encompassed part of Buffalo, as well as Grand Island, Niagara Falls and Tonawanda. In the State Senate, Masiello ascended to Minority Whip and served as Chair of the Democratic Conference. As a senator, Masiello served as the Ranking Minority Member of various committees, including the Child Care Committee and the Energy Committee.

== Mayor of Buffalo ==
Masiello was sworn in as the 61st Mayor Buffalo on January 1, 1994. Masiello received 65% of the Democratic Primary vote and 67% of the General Election vote in 1993. He was re-elected to second term in 1997 and again to a third term in 2001 with the joint endorsement of the Democratic and Republican parties.

As mayor, he focused on economic development, governmental restructuring, and education. He cut over 1,000 jobs from the city payroll by restructuring management and the police department. He successfully sought approval from the state to create a joint construction fund for the city schools, which has been used to renovate and build city schools. He unsuccessfully sought to take control of the Buffalo Board of Education and install his own appointees.

In 1997, Masiello's office, and under the direction of Buffalo State College's Center for Applied Research in Interactive Technologies, launched CityNet, an advanced telecommunications network that links 14 educational and community sites in Buffalo.

In 2005, he announced that he would not run for re-election. He was succeeded by Byron Brown on December 31, 2005. Following his service as mayor, Masiello joined Masiello, Martucci and Associates as president.

== Personal life ==
He is married to Kathleen Masiello (née McCue) of Washingtonville, New York. Anthony has three daughters, Kimberly, Ariel, and Madeline Rose.

New York State Senate
Preceded by Joseph A. Tauriello	New York State Senate; 55th District; 1981–1982	Succeeded by William M. Steinfeldt
Preceded by Dale M. Volker	New York State Senate; 58th District; 1983–1992	Succeeded by William Stachowski
Preceded by William Stachowski	New York State Senate; 57th District; 1993	Succeeded by Anthony Nanula
Political offices
Preceded by James D. Griffin	Mayor of Buffalo; 1994–2005	Succeeded by Byron Brown
