= Brager =

Brager is a surname. Notable people with the surname include:

- George Brager (1923–2003), American professor of social work
- Peter Munch Brager (1806–1869), Norwegian priest and politician
- Stacy Bragger (born 1984), Falkland Island journalist and politician

== See also ==
- Bager
