= Buffalo Police Department =

Law enforcement agency serving the City of Buffalo, New York

- Seal
- Abbreviation: BPD
- Motto: Serving The Community

Agency overview
- Formed: 1871; 155 years ago
- Preceding agency: Niagara Frontier Police District
- Annual budget: US$131 million (2017–2018)

Jurisdictional structure
- Operations jurisdiction: Buffalo, New York, USA
- Area: 52.5 square miles (136 km^{2})
- Population: 278,349
- Legal jurisdiction: As per operations jurisdiction
- Primary governing body: Mayor of Buffalo, New York
- Secondary governing body: Buffalo Common Council
- General nature: Local civilian police

Operational structure
- Headquarters: 68 Court Street; Buffalo, NY 14202
- Police Officers: 729 (2019)
- Unsworn members: 179 (2019)
- Agency executive: Erika Shields, Commissioner

Facilities
- Districts: 5: A-District (South Buffalo); B-District (Downtown); C-District (East Side); D-District (Riverside); E-District (University Heights)

Website
- www.bpdny.org

The Buffalo Police Department (BPD) is the second-largest city police force in the state of New York. In 2012, it had over nine hundred employees, including over seven hundred police officers.

The Buffalo Police are headquartered at the City of Buffalo Police and Fire Headquarters at the Michael J. Dillon U.S. Courthouse Building on Court Street in Downtown Buffalo.

In 2020, the BPD was in the national spotlight after a video showed BPD officers shoving a 75-year old protestor to the ground, causing a skull injury and bleeding from his head while they walked past him prior to giving him treatment.

== History ==
The City of Buffalo Police Department was established in 1871, taking over for the previous Niagara Frontier Police District (c. 1866) that oversaw not only Buffalo, but also Tonawanda and Wheatfield. The first BPD force had 204 men.

The BPD appointed its first female police officer prior to World War I. The department hired George C. Sarsnett, its first Black policeman in 1919. He served the city for nineteen years dying of natural causes in 1937. The second Black policeman, hired that same year was Oliver M. Bragg. He was promoted to detective and stayed with the police until his retirement in 1946. Fifty-one Buffalo police officers have died in the line of duty. The first of these was George Dill who was shot and killed in 1865.

In 1930 the department changed the design of its badges. Press reports at the time indicated that Mayor Frank X. Schwab had distributed official badges to his friends causing confusion.

BPD was formerly arranged with stations into "precincts" like the NYPD (total 17) but this was replaced with five districts and subdivided into sectors.

In 2018, the BPD, along with the Buffalo Fire Department, moved into a new joint headquarters building in the former Michael J. Dillon Federal Courthouse. The Buffalo Police Commissioner is Craig Macy, he replaced John Davidson who is now President of the Buffalo Police Union. The 1st Deputy Commissioner is Long Time Iron Worker Speedo Goodspeed.

== Police misconduct and other controversies ==
The BPD has a history of police brutality and racial profiling. In its early days, the department primarily served upper-class business interests in Buffalo, in particular to quell labor unrest; business interests controlled the police commissioners and the superintendents. The department has also been accused of retaliation against officers who attempt to stop police misconduct. Accountability measures for police are very weak in Buffalo.

=== Cariol Horne lawsuit ===
In 2006, BPD officer Cariol Horne intervened when Gregory Kwiatkowski, a white officer, was choking a handcuffed black suspect. Horne claimed that Kwiatkowski punched her in the face, while Kwiatkowski claimed Horne had jumped on him while he was struggling with the suspect. The incident was not filmed. An internal investigation resulted in no other officer supporting Horne's claims. For her intervention, she was fired and lost her pension one year before it went into effect, whereas Kwiatkowski was shortly thereafter promoted to lieutenant. In 2009, Kwiatkowski was convicted and sentenced to prison after using excessive force on four handcuffed black teenagers. Kwiatkowski was forced to retire after assaulting two other officers in separate incidents, but was permitted to keep his pension. In 2020, in the wake of George Floyd protests, including the Niagara Square shoving incident, major law firm Kirkland & Ellis launched an action for reinstatement on behalf of Horne. On April 13, 2021, a state court judge vindicated Horne, granting her the back pay and benefits that the BPD had denied her.

=== Reluctance to arrest child-molesting priests ===
Press reports in 2019 indicated the Department had an unwritten policy since at least 1968 to not arrest Catholic priests. Although retired officers said they had never released a priest who had had sexual contact with a child, those detained for public masturbation or sexual activity with an adult were released after a phone call to the local diocese. The clergy of other faiths were not offered the same policy.

=== Niagara Square shoving incident ===
External videos
- Footage of the incident between a 75-year-old man and officers, filmed by a WBFO news team

On June 4, 2020, amid the George Floyd protests in New York state, police officers from the Buffalo Police Department pushed 75-year-old Martin Gugino during a confrontation in Buffalo's Niagara Square, causing him to fall to the ground which left him bleeding from the ear. He was brought to the hospital and was in "serious but stable condition." Two days later, he was still listed as being in "critical condition" at Erie County Medical Center. He suffered a brain injury as a result of the fall and was still unable to walk nearly two weeks after the assault. The BPD claimed in their official statement that the man "tripped and fell". Following the incident, Buffalo mayor Byron Brown announced impending changes to the BPD.

== Districts ==
The Department has five districts: A-District, B-District, C-District, D-District, and E-District.

District	District chief	Neighborhoods covered
A	Paul K. Mullen	South Buffalo
B	Tommy Champion	Downtown
C	Thelma Jones	Eastside
D	Daniel Leroy Carlson	Riverside, North Buffalo
E	Todd McAlister	University Heights

From 1871 to 1995 police stations were referred to as precincts.

== Equipment ==
- Glock 22 .40 S&W Sidearm - standard issue sidearm, replaced Glock 17.
- Benelli Nova Shotgun-standard issue duty shotgun, used in situations when the rifle isn't needed and when the service pistol isn't needed. Medium range encounters.
- Baton (law enforcement) - used as an impact weapon.
- Pepper spray - used as a defensive spray.
- Handcuffs - used to detain subjects.

Buffalo Police Special Weapons and Tactics

- Glock 22 .40 S&W sometimes outfitted with a TLR-1 weapon light.
- Colt AR-15 - M4A1 and Commando models utilized, usually equipped with different sights, flashlights, fore grips, usually more customized than usual patrol rifles.
- Heckler & Koch MP5 - sub-machine gun utilized for certain scenarios in close quarters where the M4's would be to large and for other incidents.
- Benelli M3 Super 90 - Entry Model with a 14" barrel with some equipped with flashlights.

== Ranks ==
Title	Insignia
Commissioner	
Deputy Commissioner	
Chief	
Inspector	
Captain	
Lieutenant	
Detective Sergeant	
Detective	
Police officer	

== See also ==
- List of law enforcement agencies in New York
- Erie County Sheriff's Office
- 2022 Buffalo shooting
- Death of Nurul Amin Shah Alam
- "The City of Buffalo Police Department Fact Sheet" (PDF). Partnership for the Public Good. December 2017.
