= University of Pennsylvania School of Social Policy and Practice =

School of Social Policy and Practice
- Motto: Leges sine moribus vanae
- Type: Private social work, social policy, nonprofit leadership school
- Established: 1908
- Parent institution: University of Pennsylvania
- Dean: Sara S. Bachman
- Location: Caster Building, 3701 Locust Walk, Philadelphia, PA, 19104, USA; 39.95247°N 75.19753°W
- Campus: Urban
- Website: sp2.upenn.edu

The University of Pennsylvania School of Social Policy & Practice (abbreviated as SP2) is the graduate school for social work, social policy, and nonprofit leadership at the University of Pennsylvania, a private Ivy League university in Philadelphia.

The School of Social Policy and Practice (SP2) conducts research, provides academic programmes, and engages with communities and policymakers to address social challenges. Its work focuses on developing policy and practice and preparing leaders in fields related to social welfare and social change.

== History ==
The school began in 1908 when a “Course of Training in Child Helping” was developed under the direction of the Children’s Bureau of Philadelphia. Carl Kelsey was a consulting director in the 1908-09 academic year, and his colleague, James P. Lichtenberger, had full control in 1909-10. At the time, Kelsey and Lichtenberger were the only Sociology faculty members at the university. They co-taught the two-year, core course, “Theory of Sociology,” as well as “American Race Problems,” “Social Debtor Classes,” “Standards of Living,” and “Sociological Field Work." In 1910, the School greatly expanded. Its “Committee of Direction” was increased to fifteen members and its faculty, including group instructors, to sixteen.

In 1914, the school changed its name to the Pennsylvania School for Social Service. In 1918, Virginia P. Robinson was named Supervisor of Field Work and, within a year, Associate Director of the school. Over the next thirty-five years, Robinson twice served as acting head of the school. In 1919, Kenneth L.M. Pray joined the school's faculty and became the school’s first full time Director in 1922, and later became Dean in 1935. Jessie Taft also joined the faculty in 1919. Taft was an educational theorist and practitioner in psychiatric social work who was then Director of the Mental Hygiene Clinic at the Seybert Institution. Working closely with the world-renowned psychiatrist Otto Rank, she developed the “functional school” of social work, the philosophy which guided the school for fifty years.

In 1933, the school was renamed the Pennsylvania School of Social Work, and in 1935 the Trustees approved the formal affiliation of the school with the university. In 2005, the school changed its name to the School of Social Policy and Practice to reflect the inclusion of graduate programs in policy, leadership, and philanthropy, as well as expanded joint degree programs in public health, bioethics, government administration, and criminology.

== Programs ==
SP2 offers six degree programs: Master of Social Work (MSW), Master of Science in Nonprofit Leadership (NPL), Master of Science in Social Policy (MSSP), Clinical Doctorate in Social Work (DSW), Doctorate in Nonprofit Administration (DNPA) and PhD in Social Welfare and eleven dual degree programs.

== Notable alumni ==
- Ashley Biden (MSW 2010), social justice activist
- George Brager (MSW 1948), Professor and Dean of the Columbia University School of Social Work
- Charles H. Jordan, activist and advocate for refugees, received a Chevalier of the Legion of Honor by the French Foreign Legion in 1959
- Alton Lemon, civil rights activist, lead plaintiff in Lemon v. Kurtzman
- Robert Woodson (MSW 1965), author, civil rights activist, community development leader, and founder and president of the Woodson Center. Recipient of MacArthur "Genius" Grant (1990), Presidential Citizens Medal (2008), and Bradley Foundation Prize (2008).

== Notable faculty ==
- Peter Frumkin, Mindy and Andrew Heyer Chair in Social Policy
- Richard James Gelles, Joanne and Raymond Welsh Chair of Child Welfare and Family Violence
- Jessie Taft, educational theorist, professor, and practitioner of psychiatric social work

== Research Centers & Special Projects ==
- "Actionable Intelligence for Social Policy (AISP) is an initiative that focuses on the development and use of integrated data systems (IDSs) for policy analysis and program reform". University of Pennsylvania.
- Center for Guaranteed Income Research (CGIR)
- Center for High Impact Philanthropy (CHIP)
- "Welcome". University of Pennsylvania.
- Field Center for Children's Policy, Practice & Research
- "Areas of Research". University of Pennsylvania. October 22, 2026. Archived from the original on September 29, 2023.
- "Philadelphia Economic Equity Project". University of Pennsylvania.
- "SAFELab". University of Pennsylvania Annenberg School for Communication. July 19, 2018.

== See also ==
SP2 Special Projects

List of social work schools
