= George Floyd protests in New York =

George Floyd protests in New York may refer to:

- George Floyd protests in New York (state), protests in the entire state
- George Floyd protests in New York City, protests in New York City alone
