= Papo Christian =

Roberto Pérez Santoni —better known as Papo Christian— (born on November 30, 1950, in Hato Rey, Puerto Rico) is a community leader and philanthropist focused on marginalised communities. Papo began his efforts in 1967 when he organized a food drive for Biafra victims.
