= Buffalo police shoving incident =

Incident during the 2020 George Floyd protests in New York state

- Reporter Michael Desmond of WBFO filmed Buffalo police pushing Gugino to the ground. When an officer went to check on Gugino, another officer pulled him away.
- Date: June 4, 2020
- Location: Niagara Square, Buffalo, New York
- Injuries: Concussion and skull fracture
- Arrests: 2 Buffalo police officers charged with felony assault, not convicted

On June 4, 2020, amid the George Floyd protests in New York state, police officers from the Buffalo Police Department pushed 75-year-old Martin Gugino during a confrontation in Buffalo's Niagara Square, causing him to fall to the ground which left him bleeding from the ear. Gugino was seriously injured, sustaining a brain injury, and was still unable to walk nearly two weeks later. He was hospitalized for nearly four weeks.

Two Buffalo police officers were charged with felony assault in connection with the incident; they pleaded not guilty. Governor Andrew Cuomo and Senator Chuck Schumer condemned police conduct in the incident. President Donald Trump spread false and unfounded conspiracy theories about Gugino in his response to the incident on Twitter. On February 11, 2021, Erie County district attorney John Flynn announced that a grand jury had dismissed the charges against the officers.

== Martin Gugino ==
Martin Gugino (October 15, 1944 – March 9, 2026) was an American peace activist associated with the Catholic Worker Movement. He worked with the Western New York Peace Center after his retirement, and was also interested in other political issues like Guantánamo Bay and climate change. He was a native of Buffalo but spent most of his working life in Cleveland, where he "specialized in creating computer databases." At the time of the shoving incident, he resided in Amherst, a suburb of Buffalo.

Gugino died on March 9, 2026, at the age of 81. He was residing in Tampa, Florida at the time.

== Incident ==
External videos
- Footage of the assault on 75-year-old Martin Gugino, filmed by a WBFO news team

During the George Floyd protests in New York state, the Mayor of Buffalo, Byron Brown, instituted a daily curfew in the city from 8:00 p.m. to 5:00 a.m. Not long after the curfew began on June 4, Buffalo Police Department officers and New York State Police officers swept through Niagara Square, where a protest was winding down. The officers were equipped with batons, helmets, and body armor. As they advanced to clear the area in a line, they were approached by Gugino.

The encounter lasted six seconds and was caught on camera. Gugino, who was holding a helmet and a phone, approached officers Robert McCabe and Aaron Torgalski. Gugino appears to talk to the officers while gesticulating. Initially, McCabe hesitates. Some officers yell "Move" and "Push him back! Push him back!" McCabe pushed Gugino with his baton, while Torgalski used his right hand to push Gugino. A third officer, John Losi, also pushed McCabe, possibly amplifying the force of McCabe's push on Gugino. After being pushed, Gugino stumbled backwards and fell, hitting the back of his head on the pavement.

After falling, Gugino remained motionless on the pavement, bleeding from the ear. McCabe attempted to check on Gugino, but Losi stopped him from doing so, persuading McCabe to keep moving. More than a dozen Buffalo officers walked past Gugino. Two New York State Police medics aided Gugino.

== Aftermath ==
Gugino was taken to a hospital in serious condition where he was treated for a concussion and laceration. He was initially treated in the intensive care unit; as of June 9, he was transferred to a regular hospital unit and was reported to be in "fair" condition. On June 15, Gugino's lawyer said Gugino had a fractured skull and was unable to walk. After nearly four weeks, on June 30, he was released from the hospital. According to his lawyer, Gugino would continue rehabilitation, and at that point he could "walk with a little help".

== Response ==
=== Public response ===
The incident was filmed by a member of the WBFO news team. WBFO uploaded the video of the incident to Twitter at 9:13 p.m. on June 4. The footage became a viral video, accumulating over 70 million views internationally.

The incident prompted public outrage. The New York Civil Liberties Union described the incident as "casual cruelty" and called for Buffalo officials to "seriously address the police violence during this week's protest and the culture of impunity that led to this incident".

Some Facebook posts claimed without evidence that the incident was staged; these posts were labelled as false by both Facebook and PolitiFact.

=== Initial reactions by local and state officials ===
Governor Andrew Cuomo and Senator Chuck Schumer condemned the incident via social media. Erie County District Attorney John J. Flynn said the officers "crossed a line". Cuomo asked why the officers' actions were necessary, described their behavior as "just fundamentally offensive and frightening", and said the city of Buffalo should consider firing them and carry out a criminal investigation. In a statement that Gugino's lawyer passed on to CNN on June 15, Gugino said he appreciated the concern, but added, "There are plenty of other things to think about besides me."

After viewing video of the incident, Buffalo Mayor Byron Brown said he was "deeply disturbed" by it. He also said the incident was "disheartening", because in the previous days, protests were "peaceful", while he, the police, and the community were conducting meetings. On June 10, Brown announced impending changes to Buffalo police protocol, including implementing "appearance tickets" for non-violent protesters rather than having them face arrest and creating a "public protection unit" to replace the emergency response team, with an emphasis on being better-suited to handle large-scale protests. He also said the police union was "in the wrong". Buffalo Bills cornerback Josh Norman and New Orleans Saints linebacker Demario Davis attended this press conference as part of a nationwide tour to help improve awareness to social justice issues, with Davis praising Brown's plans for change.

Initially, media outlets incorrectly reported that Mayor Brown called Gugino an "agitator" and a "major instigator"; Brown was actually referring to another protester, not Gugino. Some media outlets issued corrections on their websites.

=== Buffalo police and their union ===
On June 4, 8:50 p.m., the Buffalo police department stated that "during [a] skirmish involving protesters, one person was injured when he tripped & fell"; according to The Washington Post, a video of the incident showed that this claim was false. The Buffalo police department later said that officers who were not directly involved in the incident had given the description of Gugino's supposedly having "tripped".

By June 4, 11:05 p.m., the two officers who had pushed Gugino were suspended without pay, with the Buffalo police chief ordering for an investigation of the incident.

The Buffalo police union, the Buffalo Police Benevolent Association, was angered by the suspensions of the two officers, and it retaliated on June 5 by withdrawing its legal fees support for any other Buffalo officers for incidents related to the protests. The police union's president claimed that the suspended officers "were simply following orders" and "simply doing their job" while also saying the victim "did slip". All 57 police officers from the Buffalo Police Department emergency response team resigned from the team, although they did not resign from the department. According to the police union's president, the mass resignations were a show of solidarity with the two suspended officers. However, his account has been contradicted by two of the resigned officers, who stated they resigned because of a lack of legal coverage. One of these officers said "many" of the 57 resigned officers did not resign to support the two suspended officers.

=== Criminal charges against officers ===
On June 6, officers Robert McCabe and Aaron Torgalski were charged with second-degree assault, a felony. Following an arraignment that day, at which McCabe and Torgalski pleaded not guilty, they were released without bail while awaiting a felony hearing. Erie County district attorney John Flynn announced on February 11, 2021, that a grand jury had dismissed the charges against the officers. The grand jury hearing had been delayed due to the COVID-19 pandemic. On April 10, 2022, an arbitrator ruled that the officers did not violate use-of-force guidelines in the incident.

=== President Trump's response ===
Donald J. Trump
(@realDonaldTrump)
tweeted:

Buffalo protester shoved by Police could be an ANTIFA provocateur. 75 year old Martin Gugino was pushed away after appearing to scan police communications in order to black out the equipment. @OANN I watched, he fell harder than was pushed. Was aiming scanner. Could be a set up?

June 9, 2020

President Donald Trump spread unfounded conspiracy theories regarding the incident on Twitter.

There is no evidence that Gugino is an antifa member, that the incident was a setup, that Gugino had fallen "harder than he was pushed", or that he was attempting to "scan" police devices. Mobile phone technology cannot "black out" police equipment in the manner Trump described.

Governor Cuomo sharply criticized the president during his daily news briefing, saying if Trump "ever feels a moment of decency, he should apologize for that tweet. Because it is wholly unacceptable." When asked to comment on Trump's tweet, Gugino responded via text: "Black Lives Matter". Gugino's lawyer described Trump's tweet as "dark, dangerous and untrue".

The source of the story, One America News Network (OANN), is a far-right cable news channel. The journalist behind OANN's story, Kristian Rouz, also works for Sputnik News, a Russian news agency frequently described as a propaganda outlet. In his work for OANN, Rouz has spread conspiracy theories and displayed favorable stances towards the Russian government. Rouz himself did not provide any evidence, only referring to a report by The Conservative Treehouse, a right-wing blog. The blog post, written by someone using the pseudonym "Sundance", claimed without evidence that Gugino is a "professional agitator and Antifa provocateur". It is not known who runs the blog. That afternoon, OANN founder and chairman Robert Herring Sr. tweeted to Trump, "we won't let you down as your source for credible news!", promising a follow-up report.

On June 13, protesters in San Diego, California, gathered outside OANN headquarters, where Herring Sr. challenged the crowd to prove the story was false.

=== Lawsuit ===
On February 22, 2021, Martin Gugino filed a lawsuit against the city of Buffalo, the officers involved which included one officer that was not charged, mayor Byron Brown, and police commissioners Byron Lockwood and Joseph Gramaglia. The lawsuit claims that several of Gugino's constitutional rights were violated, and the suit also desires to hold the city accountable for "concealing, excusing and/or condoning the unlawful use of force." At a deposition in the matter in February 2023, a lawyer for the police sought an injunction against alleged "harassing questions" like "Who's the police officer who committed that assault upon the citizen peacefully demonstrating against police violence?" and "What are your tattoos?" The judge ruled that there was no harassment and ordered the police officer to answer all questions asked.
