= George Floyd protests in San Diego County, California =

2020 civil unrest after the murder of George Floyd

- Part of George Floyd protests in California
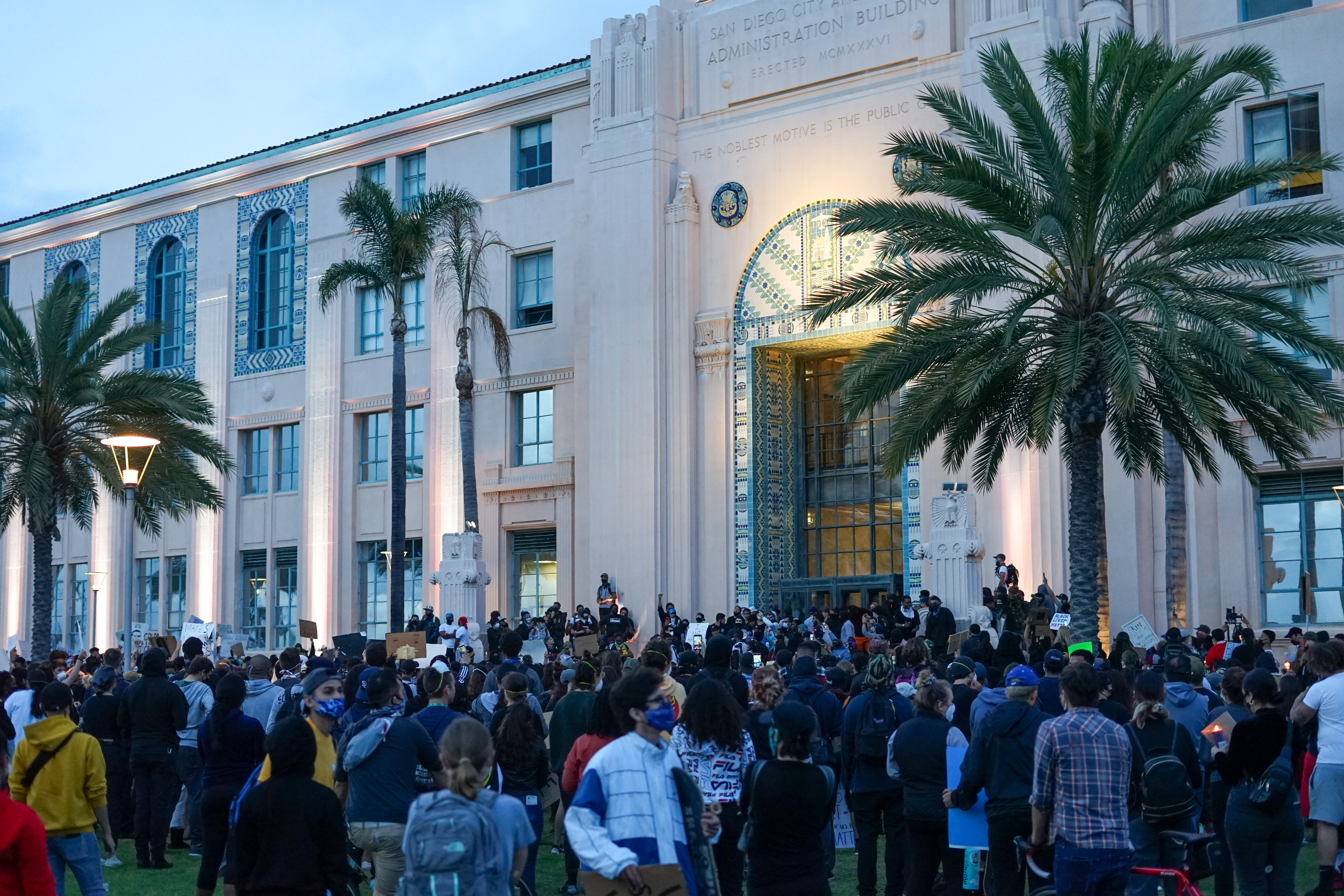
- Crowds gather outside the San Diego County Administration Building on May 31, 2020
- Date: May 28, 2020 – May 26, 2021 (11 months and 4 weeks)
- Location: San Diego County, California, United States
- Caused by: Police brutality; Institutional racism against African Americans; Reaction to the murder of George Floyd; Economic, racial and social inequality

This is a list of protests that took place in San Diego County, California, following the murder of George Floyd that took place on May 25, 2020 in Minneapolis, Minnesota, after police officer Derek Chauvin knelt on his neck for 9 minutes and 29 seconds. These events were created to fight for justice for George Floyd and other Black community members who suffer from police brutality. These demonstrations resulted in a number of policy changes, namely the ban of the cartoid neck restraints use in San Diego County and a city-wide independent review board that would review police practices.

== Timeline of county actions ==
On June 3, the county requested the Army National Guard to "assist with security in the region due to recent civil unrest."

On June 4, law enforcement agencies with Carlsbad, Chula Vista, Coronado, El Cajon, Escondido, La Mesa, National City, Oceanside, San Diego, San Diego State University, University of California, San Diego, the San Diego Community College District, and San Diego Unified School District, as well as the San Diego County Sheriff's Department and San Diego Harbor Police, announced they will no longer use carotid restraint to subdue suspects.

On June 6, hundreds of cars caravanned from La Jolla to Santee, City Heights, National City and finally Otay Mesa Detention Facility.

== Locations ==
=== 4S Ranch ===
On June 2, around 400 to 500 protesters demonstrated at a busy intersection in 4S Ranch. Earlier in the day, a car caravan protest starting at the 4S Ranch Library drove through Rancho Bernardo and adjacent communities.

=== Carlsbad ===
On June 5, hundreds of protesters rallied in Cannon Park in Carlsbad, where 8'46" of silence was observed. Carlsbad Police said they were investigating "a threat of violence against the rally", but the protest concluded peacefully.

=== Chula Vista ===
On June 4, more than 100 protesters in the Chula Vista Community Park called for police reforms and equal justice. The mayor and chief of police knelt in silence with the group

On June 8, a 2:00 p.m. protest started again at Chula Vista Community Park and then marched down Eastlake Parkway.

=== Coronado ===
On May 31, a makeshift memorial for Floyd was set up on a sidewalk near Coronado's central beach. The community kept it growing for days as people left notes, flowers, and candles.

On June 13, about 150 students from the Coronado Unified School District spoke up about the racism they experienced in schools.

=== Encinitas ===
External Videos
- Statue known as the 'Cardiff Kook' becomes symbol for justice in Encinitas on YouTube, CBS 8
- Protesters Guard Cardiff Kook Memorial on YouTube, Fox 5

On May 31, over 400 Encinitas residents gathered at the Magic Carpet Ride sculpture, also known as the Cardiff Kook, in Encinitas in commemoration of Floyd. A memorial on the statue was erected in honor of Floyd and other black victims of police violence. Cellphone footage later that night shows a woman attempting to dismantle the display by tearing down flowers and posters. Another person attempts to hold out their arms to block the memorial from her. In response to the incident, community members and protesters rebuilt the memorial and stood guard for the following nights. The memorial, which was originally meant to be temporary, remained for several weeks

On June 3, several local nonprofit organizations organized a protest at Moonlight beach that drew crowds of over several thousand people. The event, called "Paddle Out for Unity in Solidarity with Black Lives Matter", had demonstrations taking place along the beach, cliffs, and in the water. A paddle out is a memorial service in surf culture, typically used for a fallen surfer. The organizers aimed to help memorialize and mourn Floyd, as well as other black lives taken that year, including Breonna Taylor and Ahmaud Arbery. Protesters erected a display of over 70 surfboards in the sand to spell out the word "unity" and took part in an 8'46" of silence.

On June 5, hundreds gathered for a protest held in front of the Magic Carpet Ride sculpture to show continued support for the fight against police brutality. Some regional and city politicians made appearances and spoke at the event, including California Congressman Mike Levin, Assemblywoman Tasha Boerner Horvath, Encinitas Mayor Catherine Blakespear, and Encinitas Councilwoman Kelli Hinze.

On June 7, around 200 people, mainly families with children and surfers, gathered at Cardiff State Beach for a "paddle-out" memorial and demonstration.

On June 8, doctors, nurses, and health professionals rallied at the Magic Carpet Ride sculpture in Cardiff at 2:00 p.m., while another protest occurred hours later at 5:00 p.m. at Cardiff River Mouth Beach.

On June 9, between 300 and 400 high school students protested at Moonlight Beach and marched to an intersection on Coast Highway.

=== Escondido ===
On June 2, over 300 protesters gathered outside of the Escondido Police Department. The demonstrators held up signs and chanted slogans. Several police officers, including Chief Ed Varso, took to their knees in solidarity with the protesters.

On June 3, around 200 people knelt down on one knee in front of Escondido City Hall to protest police violence. City Councilwoman Olga Diaz spoke at the event to advocate for police reforms.

On June 5, several hundred Black Lives Matter activists gathered in front of Escondido City Hall.

=== Imperial Beach ===
On June 7, a protest was underway at Imperial Beach Pier Plaza when a group of men started to throw eggs at protesters. One man went to take a video of the incident and was sucker-punched from behind. Two men were eventually arrested for their involvement in the attack and were charged with felony assault and hate crimes, to which they both plead guilty.

On July 3, a candlelight vigil to commemorate victims of police brutality was attended by over 50 people at Veterans Park.

On December 13, a six-wall mural was painted in honor of Floyd and to show support for a diverse Imperial Beach. The artist, Milan Elise Finnie, was commissioned by a local advocacy group. One of the walls includes a portrait of Floyd’s youngest daughter, Gianna, who was only six years old at the time of her father's murder.

=== Julian ===
A protest occurred on June 4 at Julian. About 100 demonstrators lined Main Street with signs supporting Black Lives Matter.

=== La Mesa ===
On May 29, La Mesa was the site of the first protests in the county following Floyd's murder, partly attributed to a video of a local arrest of another unarmed black man named Amaurie Johnson. Dozens of demonstrators gathered outside the La Mesa Police Department following a viral video of the Wednesday arrest at the San Diego Trolley station at Grossmont Transit Center, which resulted in a white officer being put on leave. Marchers say they felt compelled in light of what's happening nationally.

External Videos
- Protest against alleged actions of La Mesa policeman on YouTube, CBS 8
- La Mesa officer in arrest video placed on leave, pending investigation on YouTube, 10News
- La Mesa Police Department releases body cam footage of officer who arrested man at trolley stop on YouTube

On May 30, about 1,000 protesters started at the police station and took to the streets, breaking through a police line and making their way to Interstate 8, where they blocked both sides of traffic. Back at the police station, graffiti was scrawled on the walls and some people threw rocks and bottles. Around 6 p.m., police began using tear gas, pepper balls, flash-bang, and rubber bullets to disperse the crowd. At about 8 p.m., looting began at a nearby Vons and Play It Again Sports at La Mesa Springs Shopping Center, and fires were started at that Vons and in downtown La Mesa at Chase Bank and Union Bank. The Play It Again Sports owner, who recovered some of his merchandise as looters fled, said most of the perpetrators were young, perhaps not even 18 years old. He said the store suffered an estimated $200,000 in damage. The violence also spread to Grossmont Center, which suffered vandalism and where the Walmart was looted. A 59 year old great-grandmother named Leslie Furcron was shot in the face by a rubber bullet. The graphic video went viral.

On June 1, citizens, including a member of La Mesa City Council, organized a "La Mesa Civil Defense" group on Facebook to "protect the town" by "standing in front of the buildings with fire extinguishers and garden hoses." One anonymous member of the group feared vigilantism.

On June 3, the National Guard was called to La Mesa.

On June 5, the LMPD announced late Friday that it has dropped all of the charges against the man arrested at the Trolley station.

On June 10, Leslie Furcron gave a press conference after her release from the hospital after being shot in the face with a rubber bullet by La Mesa Police on May 30.

On June 14, around 400 Black Lives Matter protesters, including more than 200 motorcyclists and women wearing hijabs, read a list of "non-negotiable demands" including a town hall meeting and the release of the name of the officer who shot Furcron in the face. The Chief of Police stated: “We are going to continue to work toward those [demands].”

On June 30, Johnson filed a lawsuit against several members of the La Mesa Police Department alleging excessive force and racially motivated violence.

On August 1, around 300 protesters gathered at La Mesa City Hall for a "We Demand Justice For Our Womxn [sic] Of Color" event. Several "physical altercations" occurred between the protesters and a civil defense group called "Defend East County". One counter-protester was arrested.

On November 3, the San Diego FBI field office, in combination with the police departments from the cities of San Diego and La Mesa, arrested two male suspects for allegedly committing arson on the Chase Bank in the May 30th protest and looting.

On December 16, Furcron announced a lawsuit accusing Detective Eric Knudsen and the city of La Mesa of battery, emotional distress and civil rights violations.

On January 6, 2021, San Diego County District Attorney announced no criminal charges would be brought against officer Knudson, who shot 59-year old protester, Furcron, with a rubber bullet in the face. It was deemed that the officer was acting in self defense since he believed he was being hit with a rock by Furcron. It was later revealed that Furcron had thrown an empty Red Bull can.

On January 3, 2021, San Diego County District Attorney Summer Stephan announced that Officer Dages was charged with filing a false police report in regards to the incident at the trolley station. Dages was acquitted at trial in December 2021. On April 12, 2022, a San Diego Superior Court judge ruled that his firing from the La Mesa Police Department was "supported by the weight of the evidence."

On March 17, 2023, the La Mesa City Council settled with Furcron, who experienced a medically induced coma and lost vision in one eye. She was awarded $10 million. Her attorney described it as "perhaps the largest non-death excessive use of force settlement in San Diego County history."

=== Oceanside ===
On June 4, a peaceful protest took place in Oceanside. On June 7, hundreds gathered for a Black Lives Matter rally in Oceanside. One of the organizers of the rally defused a potentially volatile situation when a 16-year-old white male was spotted "carrying a knife and acting strangely" at the rally.

On August 9, about 100 protesters took to the streets carrying signs and chanting and marched from Coast Highway to Oceanside Boulevard.

=== Poway ===
On May 31, about 75 people gathered on Poway Road with signs supporting Black Lives Matter. A curfew was set by the City of Poway.

On June 4 in Poway, more than 100 marched from a busy intersection, crossed to the adjacent intersection, and laid down on the ground for nine minutes.

On June 25, about 100 protesters rallied at a major intersection chanting and holding signs reading "Everyone vs. Racism" and "All Lives Don't Matter Until Black Lives Matter."

=== Ramona ===
On June 1, protesters chanting "Black Lives Matter" were confronted by self-described patriots who "aimed to defend Ramona against violence." On June 2, more than 100 protesters carried signs reading "Justice for George Floyd" and "End police brutality" at a busy intersection. Standing among them were "community peacekeepers" carrying Trump signs.

=== Rancho Peñasquitos ===
On June 9, a few hundred demonstrators gathered for a candlelight vigil at Rancho Peñasquitos Towne Center.

=== San Diego ===
On May 30, a car caravan organized by the "Racial Justice Coalition" drove through the Point Loma neighborhood. They intended to deliver a message to Mayor Kevin Faulconer at his home, but San Diego Police had barricaded the street.

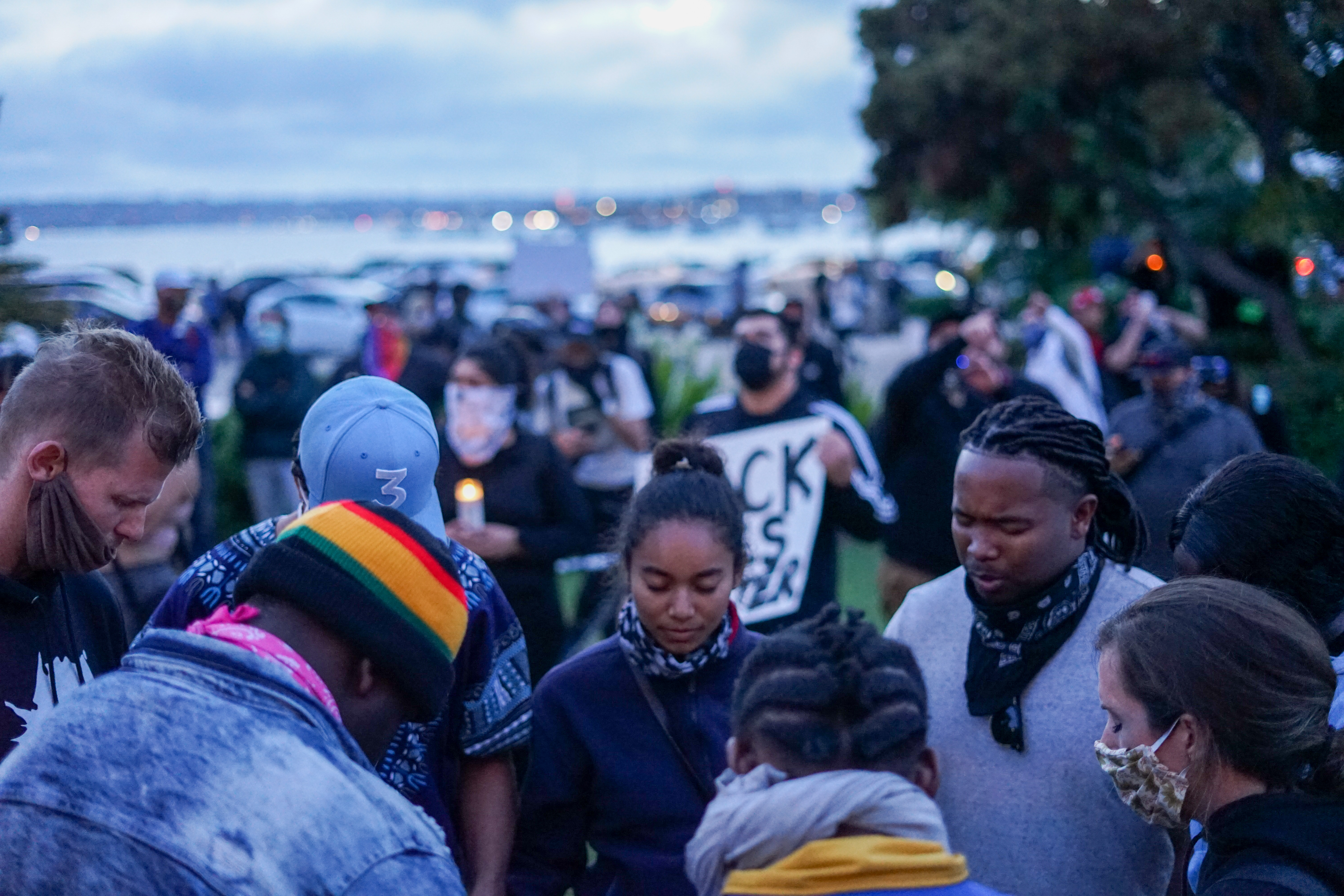
Protesters join hands in a moment of silence in San Diego on May 31, 2020

On May 31, several hundred protesters at a "Justice for George" demonstration at the Hall of Justice and then moved towards the SDPD headquarters. Police stated that the crowd was peaceful. A large crowd stayed at the police headquarters while several hundred blocked traffic and shut down the I-5 downtown. 97 people were arrested. Police officers ordered the crowds to disperse the Broadway area around 3:30pm due to rocks and bottles being thrown at officers. The police officers then deployed tear gas. Later in the evening, a crowd of around 1,000 people gathered at the County Administration Building to participate in an 8-minute moment of silence for Floyd.

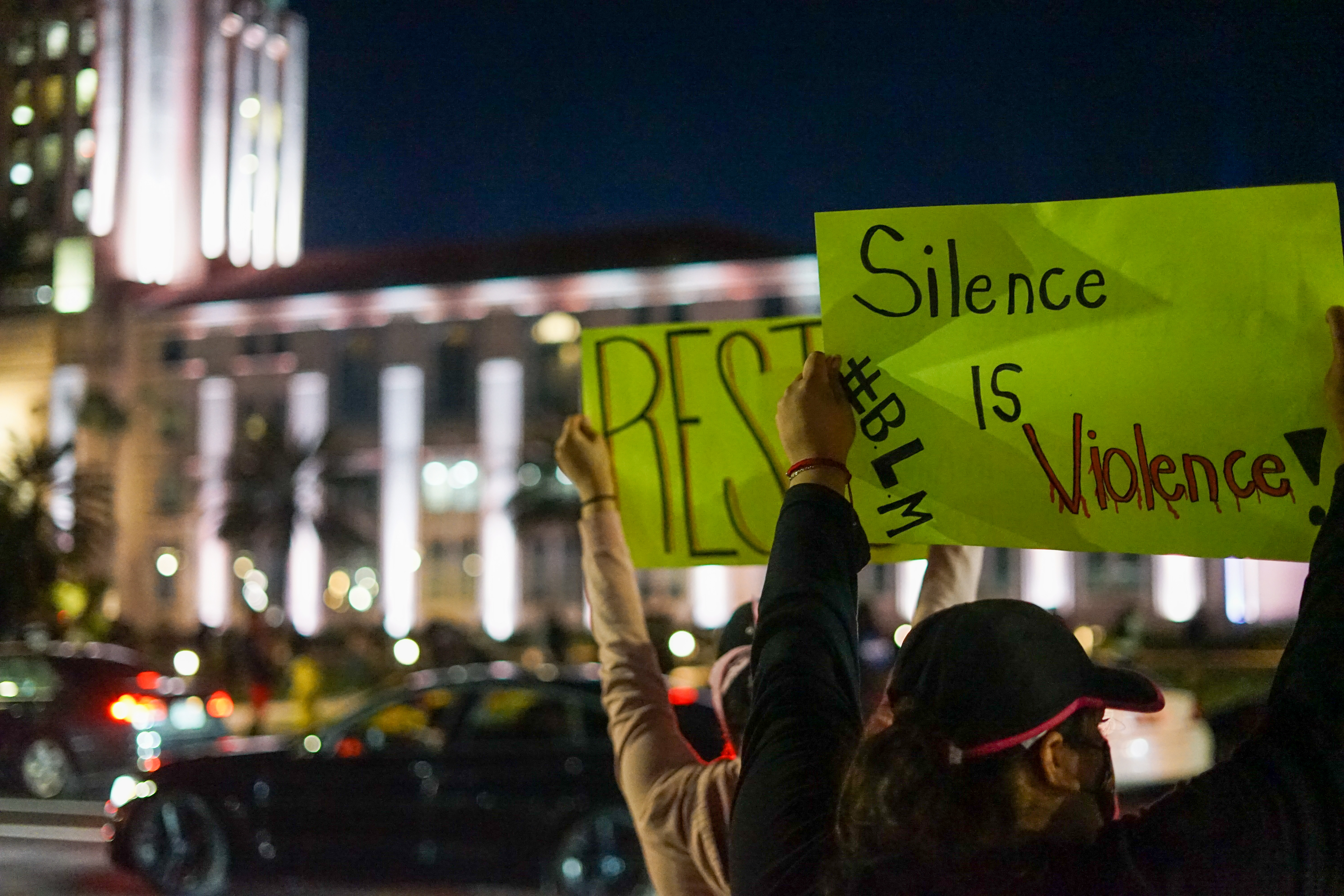
Protesters hold up signs outside the San Diego County Administration Building on May 31, 2020

Around 9:30pm, it was reported that a CVS and a Vans Store had been looted. A 7Eleven store and police car reportedly had windows broken. San Diego County officially declared a state of emergency. San Diego Police claimed rocks were thrown at them and more tear gas was deployed.

A protester allegedly shot with “kinetic impact projectiles” from law enforcement officers while attending the May 31 protest filed to sue San Diego city and county. He reported being shot twice in the legs, and once in the back when he “turned around to try and flee”.

On June 1, hundreds marched from Balboa Park to the Pride Flag in Hillcrest. A smaller group remained in the evening. SDPD declared an illegal assembly at 11:10pm saying fireworks and other objects were thrown at them. 17 people were arrested.

On June 2, several hundreds (possibly over 1000) gathered on the Bankers Hill side of Balboa Park, marched to the County Administration Building where they listened to speakers, marched through downtown, past San Diego City Hall, the Hall of Justice, and ending the protests around 8 pm at County City Administration building. Police helped to escort protesters. There was no violence reported at the event.

On June 4, at least 2,000 demonstrators marched from San Diego Police Headquarters through Hillcrest to North Park around 5pm. A woman was dragged into an unmarked car by unidentified law enforcement officers. One of the officers could be heard saying to the protesters, "You follow us, you will get shot. Do you understand me?" San Diego police department later confirmed the individuals were law enforcement officers and said the woman had hit police with her protest sign. SDPD announced that the outcome arrest will be kept secret. Several dozen protested near Mira Mesa Recreation Center.

On June 5, a "paddle-out" to support Black Lives Matter organized by Black Girls Surf was held on La Jolla Shores.

On June 6, about 3,000 protested at the County Administration building downtown. About 300 protested in Del Mar Heights. In Pacific Beach, hundreds of surfers and other supporters organized a "Paddle for Peace" demonstration at Tourmaline Surfing Park. Demonstrators observe 8'46" of silence and surfers dropped flowers and leis on the waves at a synchronized moment. June 8: Nearly 100 gathered in the Trader Joe's parking lot for a march on Garnet Avenue. In University Heights, about 100 people protested at Texas Street and Adams Avenue.

On June 6, hundreds of cars caravanned from La Jolla to Santee, City Heights, National City and finally Otay Mesa Detention Facility.

On June 8, protesters blocked roads and intersections in Hillcrest around 8pm. In La Jolla, a protest occurred in Kellogg Park.

On June 12, organizers passed out carnations and signs to hundreds of protesters at La Jolla Cove.

On June 13, the Party for Socialism and Liberation organized a rally in Waterfront Park. Another group marched from Pacific Beach to Bonita Cove. Protesters also gathered outside the offices of right-wing cable channel One America News Network on Morena Boulevard. OANN CEO and founder Robert Herring Sr. asked the protesters to prove that a conspiracy theory about the Buffalo police shoving incident retweeted by Donald Trump is false.

On June 15, The San Diego County Administration Center was lit up with red and gold-colored lights, the color of Floyd’s high school, Yates High School.

On June 20, about 1,000 skateboarders rallied downtown at a "Rolling for Rights" gathering against systemic racism.

On June 28, the Pedal for Justice San Diego Coalition organized a bike ride event from downtown San Diego to Balboa Park to raise awareness for systemic racial injustices and to advocate for underserved communities without safe access to outdoor sports.

On July 6, the San Diego NAACP's president released a statement calling for the firing of Sheriff's Deputy Mark Ritchie, who is accused of emailing an altered photo of George Floyd. The doctored photo was described as "lewd" and "racist". The image edited a nude black male porn star kneeling on top of Floyd with the text added reading "Quit resisting...". Ritchie was also accused of using excessive force that resulted in the killing of two suspects in 2005 and 2006 while pursuing them as a police officer. Ritchie was reportedly removed from active duty but remains on paid leave.

On May 25, 2021, the one-year anniversary of the murder of George Floyd, crowds gathered around noon outside of the Hall of Justice with San Diego leaders, including organizer Enrique Morones, racial justice advocate Buki Domingos, San Diego City Councilwoman Monica Montogemery Steppe, and San Diego Mayor Todd Gloria. There was a period of silence when protesters took to their knees for nine minutes and 29 seconds, the duration that Chauvin spent kneeling on Floyd's neck. Speakers addressed the crowd and discussed the importance of remembering Floyd’s life, policy changes such as the ban of the chokehold, and addressing future work around policy changes. Later that evening, people organized outside of the San Diego County Administration center for a candlelight vigil and memorial. The building, as was as Balboa park, was lit up in blue and green lights, the colors of Minneapolis, in honor of Floyd. Several dozen racial justice speakers from a civil rights-based nonprofit group founded in San Diego, The People’s Association of Justice Advocates, such as Rev. Shane Harris, and Floyd's cousin, Gary Jones, a Naval officer, lead the event. Jones was stationed in Guam on the USS Theodore Roosevelt at the time of Floyd's murder and the following protests. He is now stationed in San Diego. The crowd chanted calling for the George Floyd Justice in Policing Act of 2021 to be passed by the U.S. Senate which aims to reduce and prevent excessive force use at the hands of police officers. Jesse Evans, a black San Diegan, whose video of him being brutalized by police went viral, was also present at the event.

=== Santee ===
On June 2, a man and a woman were arrested in Santee on weapons and child endangerment charges after allegedly pointing a semi-automatic handgun at Black Lives Matter protesters at a major intersection.

On June 3, approximately 200 protesters gathered at the same intersection. Multiple arrests were made for curfew violations.

On June 8, a protest marched from West Hills Parkway to the bridge over Santee Recreational Lakes.

=== Solana Beach ===
On June 3, over 200 protesters carried signs in front of Solana Beach City Hall.

== Education Contribution ==
In San Diego County, many institutions contributed in protesting the murder of George Floyd. San Diego State University, University of California, San Diego, University of San Diego, and the San Diego Community College District, all had participated in advocating for racial equity and social justice.

=== San Diego State University ===
In early June 2020, San Diego State University promoted healing circles after the tragic event that lead police officer Derek Chauvin to murder George Floyd. The events were posted on the SDSU event page to promote the injustice that happens in the Criminal justice system towards the Black communities. SDSU provided multiple events that helped promote the end of Police violence, which allowed people around campus to come together and express their feelings. Office of the President at SDSU announce a variety of events that people were welcome to join and listen to how people felt. The events were mostly virtual, but there were some in person gatherings for healing .

On June 1, 2020, SDSU sent out zoom links for students and other people in the community to join and talk about the George Floyd incident. SDSU welcomed anyone to join the links. These links were also for people who wanted to become allies with each other to promote justice.

On June 4, 2020, SDSU held a virtual event called “Teaching and Supporting Black Students: Advancing Student Needs in Times of Racial Crisis.” The link was provided for everyone in the SDSU community.

=== University of California, San Diego ===
In early June 2020, University of California, San Diego had multiple departments come out with statements about the George Floyd incident such as the Communication department, department of Education Studies, Student Affairs, OASIS department and so on. The Communication department sent out a message with solidarity for George Floyd and other black community members that were affected by Police brutality. The statement mentioned different demands that the department of Communications is fighting for due to the lack of social justice within the black community. Some of the demands were to improve the enrollment rates for Black students, also to improve the rates of Black faculty and staff.

On June 6, 2020, Many people gathered in cars and in person to protest against police brutality around UCSD campus in the La Jolla area. These protesters held up traffic on the main roads near UCSD campus known as, La Jolla Village Drive, Genesee Avenue, and Torrey Pines Road North. There were protesters who were in traffic that continued to chant out names of the victims who are affected from police violence. After a while, protesters then started heading towards Westfield UTC mall area to spread the solidarity around the La Jolla community.

In October 2020, the Student Affairs office at UCSD came out with a statement of solidarity for George Floyd. In the statement it mentioned how they do not agree with the actions that are being made towards the Black community and will continue to be allies to fight for equality.

In early May 2021, an organization called "Cops Off Campus Coalition - UCSD," had made a webpage talking about the reasons for Abolition May. The page has lots of information about different events they create to help provided solidarity for the Black Lives Matter Movement.

On May 24, 2021, the organization "Cops Off Campus Coalition - UCSD," hosted an event marking the one-year anniversary of George Floyd's murder. The event took place at Doyle Community Park, close to UCSD campus. Music, art, and guest speakers spoke about the transformative justice were all part of the event.

On June 1, 2021, "Cops Off Campus Coalition - UCSD" created another protest to give solidarity for those who died from police brutality, but also protested against cops being on school campuses. The protest started on La Jolla Farms Road and eventually blocked the entire road. Protesters shouted out different phrases such as "Black Lives Matter," or "Hey! Hey! Ho! Ho! These racist cops have got to go!". The protest was three hours long and many people showed support.

=== University of San Diego ===
On May 29, 2020, University of San Diego, office of the President, came out with a statement of solidarity for George Floyd and gives prayers for his family.

On June 2, 2020, USD held a virtual prayer service at 7p.m for George Floyd and his family. The service was open for USD community members and students to allow more people to pray for the people that are impacted by racism and violent acts.

=== San Diego Community College District ===
On April 20, 2021, the Chancellor of the San Diego Community College District came out with a statement about the three guilty verdicts in George Floyds case. In the statement, it mentioned how these three verdicts are improvements for justice towards the black community. The Chancellor also announced how these verdicts are one step closer to bring justice for everyone that is impacted by police brutality.

== Policy responses ==
In early June, the San Diego City Council voted to create a new office of race of equity and to maintain the police budget. In the public comment portion of this city council meeting, the majority of the 10 hour period was focused on decreasing the police budget. The City Council voted almost unanimously to approve the budget, including a 5% increase to the police budget, with Councilmember Chris Ward casting the only "no" vote. After the meeting, a group of protesters gathered peacefully in front of Mayor Kevin Faulconer's home.

In early June 2020, all of the law enforcement agencies operating within San Diego County banned the use of the cartoid neck restraint, the same hold that Officer Derek Chauvin used in the murder of George Floyd. Starting on June 1, 2020 when San Diego Police Chief David Nisleit announced the end of its use by the San Diego Police Department, the sheriff's office and the other San Diegan law enforcement agencies quickly followed suit. While a welcome policy, San Diego activists were not satisfied with the minimal, incremental change.

In late June 2020, Mayor Kevin Faulconer and Police Chief David Nisleit announced new de-escalation policies for the San Diego Police Department. These policies introduce a requirement for officers to intervene if they see another officer using excessive force. These policies received backlash for failing to acknowledge racial disparities that encourage officers to use excessive force.

The San Diego County Board of Supervisors approved a series of police reform policies brought forward by Supervisor Nathan Fletcher in late June, referred to as the "Racial Justice and Law Enforcement Realignment Policy Package". These reforms would create an Office of Equity and Racial Justice at the County of San Diego, increase the oversight that the county has over law enforcement practices, and begin steps toward creating a response team that would replace police officers during situations involving mental health crises and homelessness.

In July, the San Diego City Council unanimously approved of putting Measure B on the 2020 ballot. Measure B would create an Independent Review Board of Police Practices. This board would investigate misconduct and review complaints concerning the San Diego Police Department. In the November 3rd election, San Diego voters approved of this measure with 74.6% of the vote. Establishment of the board is currently contingent on when the city council can allocate funding for it.

In April 2021, Mayor Todd Gloria proposed a $19 million dollar increase to the police budget. The office of the mayor states that these increases are necessary in order to cover pensions for retired police officers and rising utility charges. This move received criticism in the wake of the call to re-allocate funds, or defund the police, from the police department in favor of community-based social services.

== After Derek Chauvin trial ==
Preceding the conviction of Derek Chauvin in the murder of George Floyd, Mayor Todd Gloria made a statement over the San Diego Police Department radio. In this statement, Gloria states that "today's verdict is just the beginning of building a deeper trust with our community". Gloria received backlash from this statement, particularly because of his assessment of members of the SDPD as "people who help complete strangers on the worst day of their life; you are people who believe in collaboration and community." This assessment seemingly praised and comforted members of the SDPD, but Gloria responded saying that he "heard from individual officers that appreciated the check-in... in a highly polarizing time".

On April 20, 2021, San Diegans met at Waterfront Park and marched in the streets around the San Diego County Administration Center to celebrate Chauvin's conviction. The route of the march also blended with a Black Lives Matter march fighting for abolition of police that was hosted in Downtown San Diego on B Street at the same time.

On April 21 community members gathered at North Park Community Park to celebrate Chauvin's conviction and call for police accountability in San Diego.

== See also ==
- Black Lives Matter
- George Floyd protests in California
- List of George Floyd protests in the United States
- List of George Floyd protests outside the United States
- Racism
- Police Brutality
- Murder of George Floyd
- Trial of Derek Chauvin
