= Cariol Horne =

American former police officer

Cariol Holloman-Horne
- Police career
- Country: United States
- Allegiance: Buffalo
- Department: Buffalo Police Department
- Service years: 1988–2008
- Rank: Sworn in as an officer (1988)

Cariol Holloman-Horne (previously known as Cariol Horne) is an American former police officer who was fired from the Buffalo Police Department and lost her pension after she physically stopped a fellow officer from chokeholding a handcuffed suspect in 2006. In October 2020, Buffalo adopted "Cariol's Law", to require police to intervene if a fellow officer uses excessive force. In 2021, a New York court awarded her the pension and back pay she earned.

== Police career ==
In 1988, Horne joined the Buffalo Police Department. On November 1, 2006, Horne responded to an "Officer in Trouble" call. When she arrived at and got into the residence, Officer Gregory Kwiatkowski had Neal Mack in handcuffs, cuffed in the front. During the arrest, when Mack was outside, Horne observed Kwiatkowski using a chokehold, and has stated she yelled "Greg, Greg, you’re choking him," and "When he didn't stop, that's when I grabbed his arm from around Neal Mack's neck," and "That's when [Kwiatkowski] came up out of the crouched position and punched me in the face."

Kwiatkowski and other officers who had been present at the scene stated Horne endangered Kwiatkowski during the arrest. An internal investigation by the Buffalo Police Department did not find wrongdoing by Kwiatkowski and offered a four-day suspension to Horne that she did not accept. In 2008, she faced 13 departmental disciplinary charges, and after a public hearing, 11 were sustained. She was fired in May 2008. The recommendation for her dismissal by the arbitrator was later upheld in 2010 after she appealed the decision in court. Her firing happened months before she was eligible for a full pension.

In 2011, following a lawsuit filed by Kwiatkowski against Horne and her attorney for defamation, Kwaitkowski won a $65,000 judgment against Horne, and the court found the attorney made several defamatory and false statements, including by stating Horne "saved the life of a suspect who was already in handcuffs and was being choked out by officer Greg Kwiatkowski." In 2012, Mack lost a lawsuit filed against the Buffalo Police following a jury trial.

In 2014, Kwiatkowski was convicted of a misdemeanor charge of deprivation of rights under color of law after a plea agreement in a case based on his 2009 use of excessive force against four handcuffed Black teenage suspects, and was sentenced to four months in prison and four months of home confinement.

== Cariol's Law ==
In June 2020, Horne and other community activists announced the proposed legislation "Cariol's Law", to require officers to intervene against excessive force and to protect intervening officers from retaliation. Horne helped draft the law and advocated for its passage since 2016. In September 2020, the Buffalo Common Council passed "Cariol's Law", and in October 2020, the mayor of Buffalo signed "Cariol's Law" as the Duty to Intervene law.

Holloman-Horne now advocates for the Buffalo "Duty to Intervene" law to become a national policy.

== Restoration of pension and back pay ==
In June 2020, the law firm Kirkland & Ellis accepted her case, and in October 2020, filed a lawsuit on her behalf for back pay and to restore her pension by overturning the termination of her employment. In June 2020, Buffalo officials also indicated they were reexamining the case and asked for a state investigation.

In 2021, a New York State Supreme Court vacated the 2010 court ruling, and awarded her back pay and her pension. The court wrote, "The legal system can at the very least be a mechanism to help justice prevail, even if belatedly," and "The City of Buffalo has recognized the error and has acknowledged the need to undo an injustice from the past. While the Eric Garners and George Floyds of the world never had a chance for a 'do over', at least here the correction can be done."

The decision of the court was in part based on the passage of "Cariol's Law". After the ruling, a spokesperson for the City of Buffalo stated, "The City has always supported any additional judicial review available to Officer Horne and respects the court's decision."

== Personal life ==
She is a mother of five children.
