= Charles H. Jordan =

American humanitarian (1908–1967)

- Born: 7 February 1908; Philadelphia, Pennsylvania
- Died: 16–20 August 1967 (aged 59); Prague, Czechoslovakia
- Education: University of Berlin; Pennsylvania School of Social Work; New York School of Social Work
- Employer: American Jewish Joint Distribution Committee
- Title: Executive Vice President
- Awards: Chevalier of the Legion of Honor (1959); Order of Leopold II (1967); Nansen Refugee Award (posthumously, 1968)

Charles Harold Jordan (born February 7, 1908, died August 16–20, 1967) was an American Jewish humanitarian who worked as the executive vice president for the American Jewish Joint Distribution Committee until his death.

Jordan moved from the United States to Germany as a child. As an adult, he fled to Prague after being attacked by his wife's Nazi-brother, before returning to the U.S.. His work took him to Cuba, China, France, and Switzerland.

He died in Prague in 1967 amidst unclear circumstances. Czechoslovak authorities stated that Jordan died by drowning in the Vltava River and alleged suicide. However, Czechoslovak defector Josef Frolík reported in 1974 that Jordan died in the Egyptian embassy in Prague, at the hands of Palestinian interrogators after being abducted. He was posthumously awarded the Nansen Refugee Award in 1968.

== Life ==
Jordan was born in Philadelphia on February 7, 1908, to Jewish parents Hertha and R. Alfred Jordan. After the breakup of his parents, his mother took him and his sister to Berlin, where he attended school. He was educated at the University of Berlin.

As an adult, Jordan was a Zionist whose first job was with engineering company Orenstein & Koppel. While holidaying in Krummhübel (present-day Karpacz, Poland) Jordan met the daughter of guesthouse owner, Elizabeth Nemela, later marrying her in 1931. After being attacked by her Nazi brother in 1933, the couple fled as refugees to Prague and lived in Dlouhá Street. In Prague, American embassy officials delayed Jordan's attempts to get an American passport for himself and a visa for his non-American wife. When he did return to the U.S., Jordan attended Pennsylvania School of Social Work and the New York School of Social Work. He took employment with the Jewish Family Welfare Society of Philadelphia, the Philadelphia County Relief Board, the Jewish Social Service Association in New York City, the National Committee for the Resettlement of Foreign Physicians, and at the National Refugee Service. Jordan and Nemela lived at 340 East 64th Street, New York City.

Jordan joined the American Jewish Joint Distribution Committee (JDC) in 1941, initially as the director of the Caribbean region, based at the organisation's regional headquarters in Havana, Cuba. As he helped Jews flee Nazi Germany for Cuba, the Office of Strategic Services (the predecessor to the US Central Intelligence Agency) suspected him of collaborating with the Nazis, believing that Nazis allowed Jewish refugees' escape in return for espionage activities. From 1943 until 1945, Jordan served in the U.S. Navy before returning to work for the JDC as their Director of Far Eastern Activities based in Shanghai. In 1947, Jordan pushed the Australian Government to be more accepting of Jewish refugees seeking to flee from Shanghai. In 1948, he led the JDC's emigration department in Paris where he helped Jewish refugees escape persecution in Eastern Europe. In 1950, he moved to Hungary, where he helped keep Jewish hospitals and soup kitchens operational, while supporting Jewish refugees fleeing westwards. Jordan fled Hungary just as his local collaborators were arrested and accused of partaking in Zionist conspiracies.

In 1948, Jordan criticised the United Kingdom's immigration policy for favouring single people and prohibiting "Jews, Russians, Russian-Ukrainians, White Russians, and stateless Russians". Jordan also worked with the United Nations to support the needs of Burmese, Tibetan, Vietnamese, and Palestinian refugees. During the 1950s Jordan helped create the Swiss organization the Societé de Secours et d'Entreaide (English: "Relief and Mutual Aid Society") to provide a more official means to support Jewish refugees in Eastern Europe, and to enable communist countries avoid dealings with a Jewish organisation that they were in tension with. In 1955, Jordan was appointed as the operations officer for JDC, and was appointed as the organisation's head in 1965, succeeding the recently deceased Moses A. Leavitt. He became the first senior leader of a Jewish organization to travel to Arab countries, where he secretly negotiated on behalf of the minority Jewish communities. His travels took him to Egypt, Lebanon, and Syria.

In 1956, while representing the Standing Conference of Voluntary Agencies Working for Refugees, Jordan pushed the United Nations High Commissioner for Refugees (UNHCR) to do more for Hungarian refugees trying to flee westwards. In 1967, he wrote to UNHCR calling for better support for Palestinian refugees.

Jordan was awarded the French Chevalier of the Legion of Honor in 1959, and received an award from the Norwegian Refugee Council in 1963. In June 1967, King Baudouin of Belgium nominated him as an Officer of the Order of Leopold II for his humanitarian work to support Belgian Jews.

== Disappearance and death ==
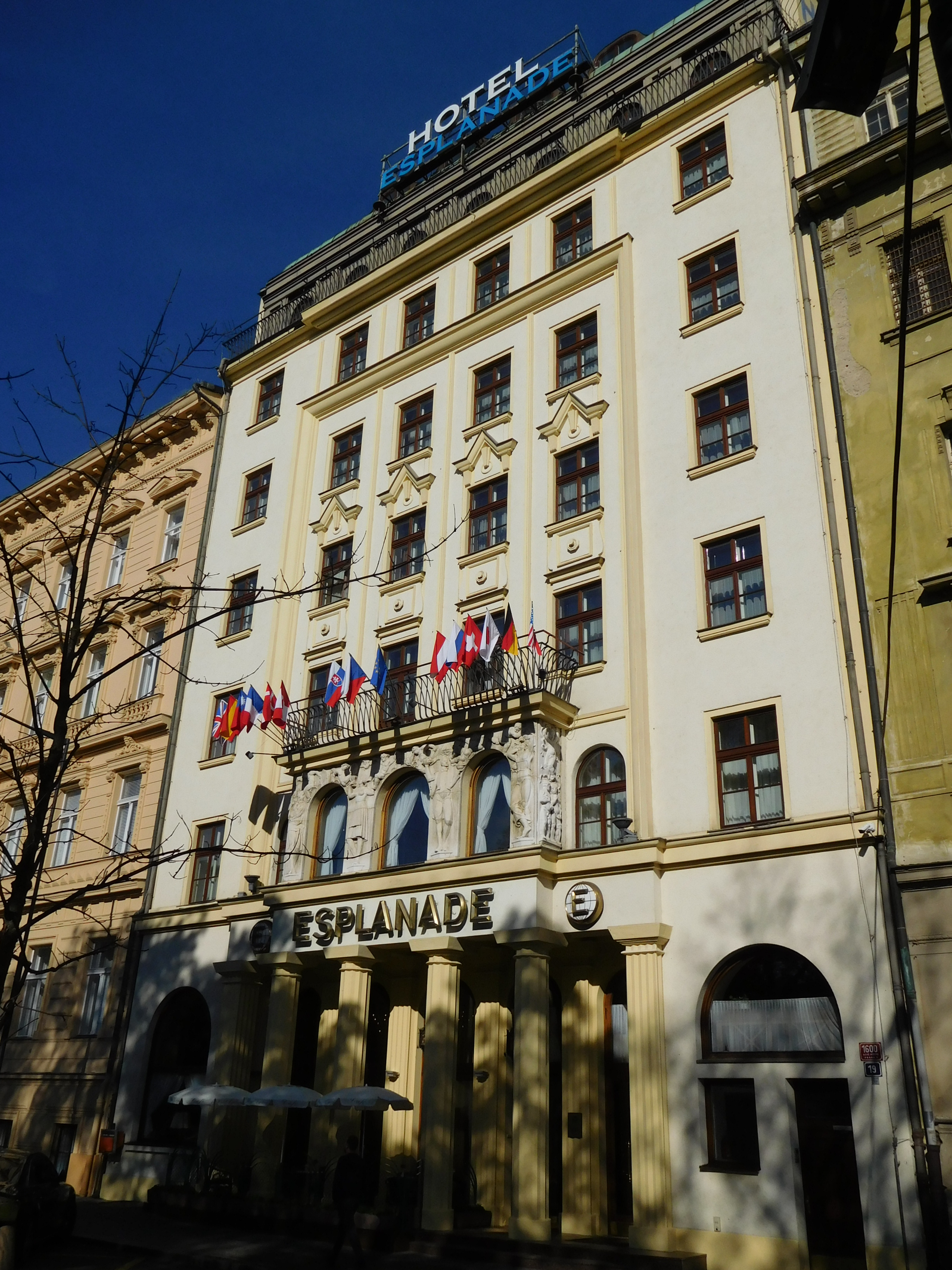
Esplanade Hotel, Washington Street, Prague

Jordan went missing on the evening of August 16, 1967 while on holiday with his wife in Prague, during a stay at the Esplanade Hotel on Washington Street. His body was found by a rower on a weir between Střelecký Island and the Charles Bridge over the Vltava River on August 20, 1967. Jordan was 59 years old at the time of his death.

A Czechoslovak pathologist concluded that Jordan died by drowning, with no signs of trauma. The Czechoslovak government made a public statement that Jordan had taken his own life. In 2007, Czech newspaper Lidové noviny noted the Czechoslovak support for Arab states and the anti-Zionist campaign in communist states at the time, and critiqued the government for its production of misinformation and culture of secrecy. At the request of the U.S. government, physician Alexander Gonik and professor Ernest Hardmeyer, both from Switzerland, undertook a second autopsy several hours later, with the permission of the Czechoslovak authorities. Jordan's nephew Paul Kaplan identified Jordan's body based on clothing and his wedding ring.

In 1974, Czechoslovak defector Josef Frolík told the Central Intelligence Agency that Jordan had been abducted outside the Esplanade Hotel by Arab agents and died during interrogation by Palestinians at the Egyptian embassy in Prague. Frolik stated that Czechoslovak security services observed the abduction and were aware where Jordan was being held, but decided not to involve themselves in the matter.

== Aftermath ==
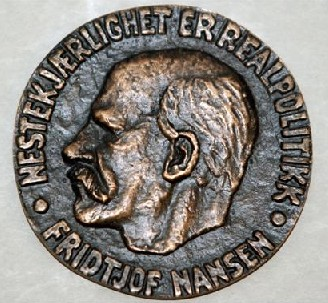
Nansen Refugee Award medal

Rabbi Alexandru Șafran spoke at a memorial for Jordan held in the Synagogue of Geneva on September 16, 1967. A eulogy was delivered by Israel's ambassador to the United Nations, Mordecai Kidron.

Jordan's employers, the JDC, had commonly been denounced in communist press as a "subversive Zionist agency". On November 17, 1967, an anonymous tip was received that Jordan was assassinated by Arab students, but the letter was lost. The New York Times reported his death as occurring in "mysterious circumstances". The American government twice asked Czechoslovak authorities for an official inquiry into Jordan's death.

Jordan was posthumously awarded the Nansen Refugee Award on September 27, 1968.

In July 2007, the American Jewish Joint Distribution Committee made a request to the United States Secretary of State Condoleezza Rice to re-open the investigation into Jordan's death.
