= Bager =

Bager is a Danish surname. Notable people with the surname include:

- Erling Bager (born 1946), Swedish politician
- Henning Bager (born 1981), Danish motorcycle speedway rider
- Johann Daniel Bager (1734–1815), German painter
- Jonas Bager, Danish footballer
- Kenneth Bager (born 1962), Danish musician and record producer
- Martin Bager (born 1982), Danish handball player

== See also ==
- Louise Bager Due (born 1982), Danish handball player
