= Center for High Impact Philanthropy =

Center at the University of Pennsylvania

The Center for High Impact Philanthropy (CHIP) is a center at the School of Social Policy and Practice at the University of Pennsylvania in the United States focused on high impact philanthropy, both in the US and internationally. The Center translates the best available evidence in areas such as education and early childhood development, disaster relief, poverty, democracy, and public health into actionable guidance and educational programs for those looking to make a difference with their giving.

CHIP produces guidance on specific issue areas, such as improving child survival rates and supporting mental health, in addition to its yearly High Impact Giving Toolkit and its High Impact Philanthropy Academy, an education program designed for individual donors, professional grantmakers, and other philanthropic leaders.

== History ==
The Center for High Impact Philanthropy was established in the Spring of 2006 as a collaboration between the School of Social Policy & Practice and alumni of the Wharton School, including former SP2 dean Richard Gelles and Founding Executive Director Katherina Rosqueta.

=== Early Work ===
CHIP's first publication, I'm Not Rockefeller, authored by Kathleen Noonan and Katherina Rosqueta, explored how high net worth philanthropists (philanthropists who give at least $1 million annually) approach giving. Key findings of that study that informed CHIP's subsequent work were that the amount of wealth philanthropists have does not affect their approach to philanthropy and that there is confusion amongst philanthropists about the difference between what Rosqueta called High Impact Philanthropy – maximizing the positive change that an amount of funding can have on any given cause, and High Input Philanthropy – putting in large amounts of funding into a cause.

During its early years, the CHIP team was focused on two major areas: education in the United States and global public health priorities. In line with these focus areas, the Center published Pathways to Student Success, which examines multiple approaches to creating student success through giving and evaluates them on the center's "cost per impact" scale, as well as Lifting the Burden of Malaria, which offered donors ways to use their giving to ease the Malaria crisis that had become an issue in sub-Saharan Africa.

At the onset of the economic crisis of 2008, CHIP also examined how philanthropy could better link considerations of impact and cost as outlined in Philanthropic Triage During an Economic Downturn. This cost per impact model was included in Measuring and/or Estimating Social Value Creation, written by Melinda Tuan and commissioned by the Bill & Melinda Gates Foundation.

=== Fall 2009 – 2015 ===
Following from the 7.0 magnitude earthquake that struck Haiti in January 2010, CHIP published Haiti: How Can I Help, a guide to show donors how they can apply their philanthropic capital to help Haiti recover from the consequences of the earthquake and the challenges the nation faced before the earthquake occurred. In 2011, CHIP's issue-specific, cost-per-impact model was highlighted in a chapter of Women’s Health and the World’s Cities, which laid out how philanthropy can be utilized to enhance the health of urban women.

To address the varying perceptions of evidence in philanthropy, CHIP published Rethinking the E Word in 2014. The authors posit that perceptions of evidence in philanthropy differ depending on who is observing the philanthropic act. CHIP deduced that there are “three circles of evidence” in philanthropy: research and scientific evidence, field experience, and informed opinion.

=== 2016 - 2020 ===
In 2016 the Center for High Impact Philanthropy began teaching principles of High Impact Philanthropy to individuals and leaders in philanthropy in an executive education program for funders. In 2020 the program was renamed High Impact Philanthropy Academy.

In 2017 CHIP's director, Kat Rosqueta, authored Impact investing: Aligning money, values, and social impact goals with Family Firm Institute, discussing how family foundations can ease the tension of alignment within their foundations and streamline grantmaking and investment practices to maximize impact in their issue areas. Additionally, CHIP published We the People: A Philanthropic Guide to Strengthening Democracy in partnership with the Democracy Fund. CHIP laid out proposals with the potential to address structural inequality in Choosing Change, a collaboration with the MacArthur Foundation's Lever for Change. CHIP also published Talent for Giving: Building the Team to help you do good in partnership with the Gates Foundation.

=== 2021- Present ===
In 2021 CHIP launched the Women's Index: Developing a Tool for Aligning Financial Investments with Gender Equity in partnership with the Women of the World Endowment (WoWE).

In October of 2023, CHIP released Israel/Gaza Crisis: How Can I Help?, guidance on how donors can contribute to easing the crisis in the Middle East and a list of nonprofits sending supplies and other forms of aid. In January 2024, Kat Rosqueta, CHIP's director, was named to Unboxed Philanthropy's Philanthropy 100 list of individuals and organizations making a strong positive impact in the world of philanthropy. On April 8, 2024, Kat Rosqueta was featured in Worth.com's article Does Effective Altruism Still Work? discussing how young donors are utilizing the effective altruism framework and data combined with the initial moral drive of doing as much good as possible.

CHIP's High Impact Philanthropy Academy, occurring annually in May, was listed in the Human Rights Funders Network events list during May 2024 for members to learn more about and consider attendance.

== Programs and Resources ==
Alongside aforementioned publications and collaborations, the Center for High Impact Philanthropy offers the High Impact Giving Toolkit, coupled with a free webinar, and the High Impact Philanthropy Academy. The Toolkit is a free resource designed to be available to anyone who is looking to maximize the impact of their giving for any donation amount in any area of interest, as highlighted by Kelly Andrews when the Toolkit was featured in Penn Today in January 2024. In May 2024, CHIP hosted its 8th annual High Impact Philanthropy Academy.

== Media coverage ==
Nicholas Kristof featured the center in his New York Times series, the Year of Giving Better, writing that the center "examines a variety of important areas such as the empowerment of women and girls, early education and global health."

The Center for High Impact Philanthropy has been featured in the New York Times, NPR, Generocity, Money, The Chronicle of Philanthropy, Newsweek, the Boston Globe, Top of Mind with Julie Rose, Forbes, Inside Philanthropy, The Philadelphia Inquirer, Forbes India, GiveWell, WHYY, in addition to other publications.
