= Food drive =

Form of charity

A food drive is a form of charity that is conducted by a group of individuals or a corporation to stockpile and distribute foodstuffs to people who cannot afford food.

== Overview ==
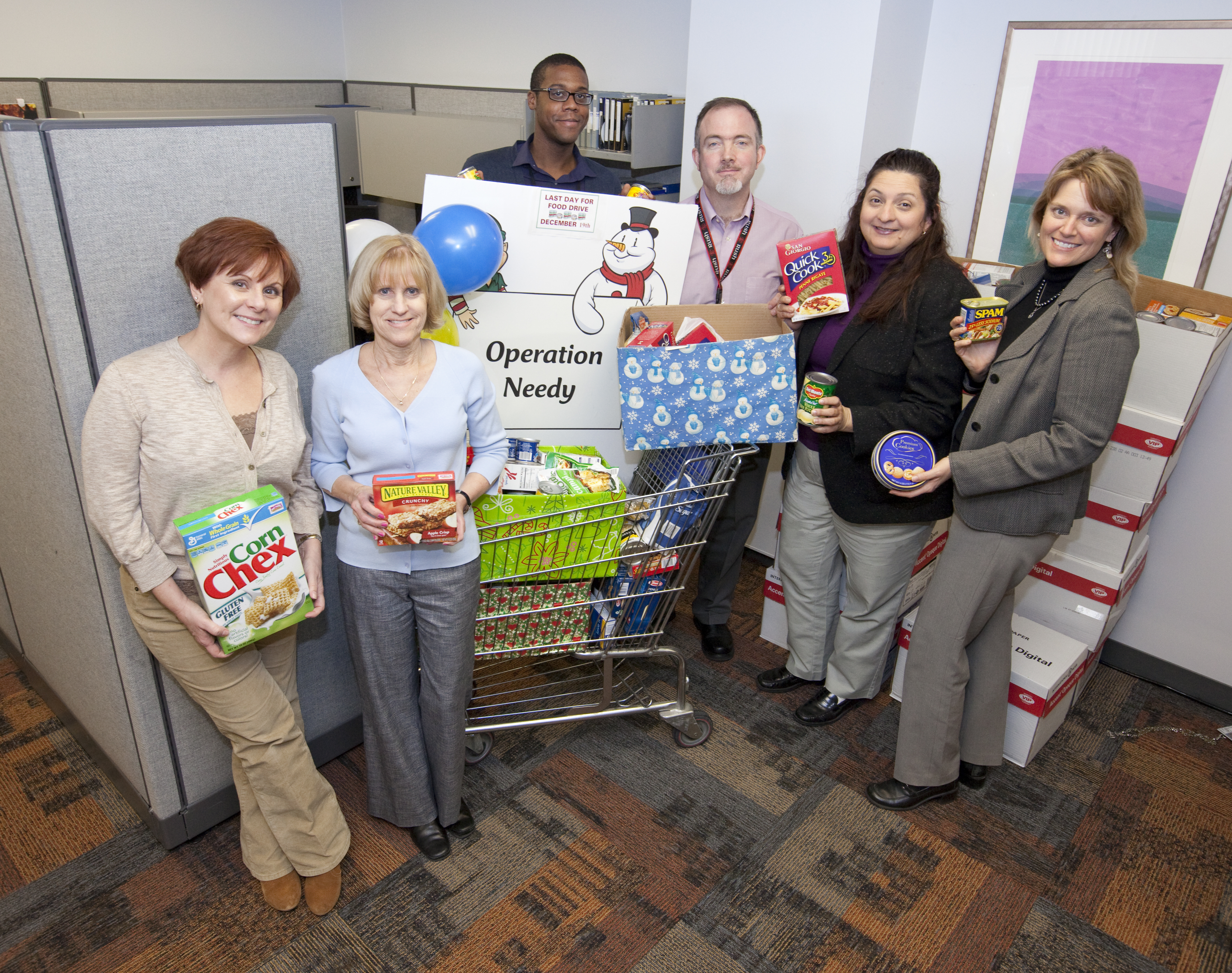
Non-perishable food items collected during a holiday food drive.

Food drives are operated in order to stock food banks that distribute food to homeless people, soup kitchens, vulnerable seniors, orphanages, refugees, and victims of disasters. There are also food drives to help people hold feasts on Christmas and Thanksgiving. Many are organized by community organizations, nonprofits, churches, and even individuals.

== Criticism ==
Many people involved in charity work are critical of the inefficiency of food drives. Emergency food providers are able to buy surplus stock from the food industry at a significant discount, Katherina Rosqueta of the Center for High Impact Philanthropy estimating it at 5% of retail price. Instead of buying canned food at store prices and physically donating it, a monetary donation to the same value could be used to acquire a much greater amount of food, and of a variety chosen by the food charity.

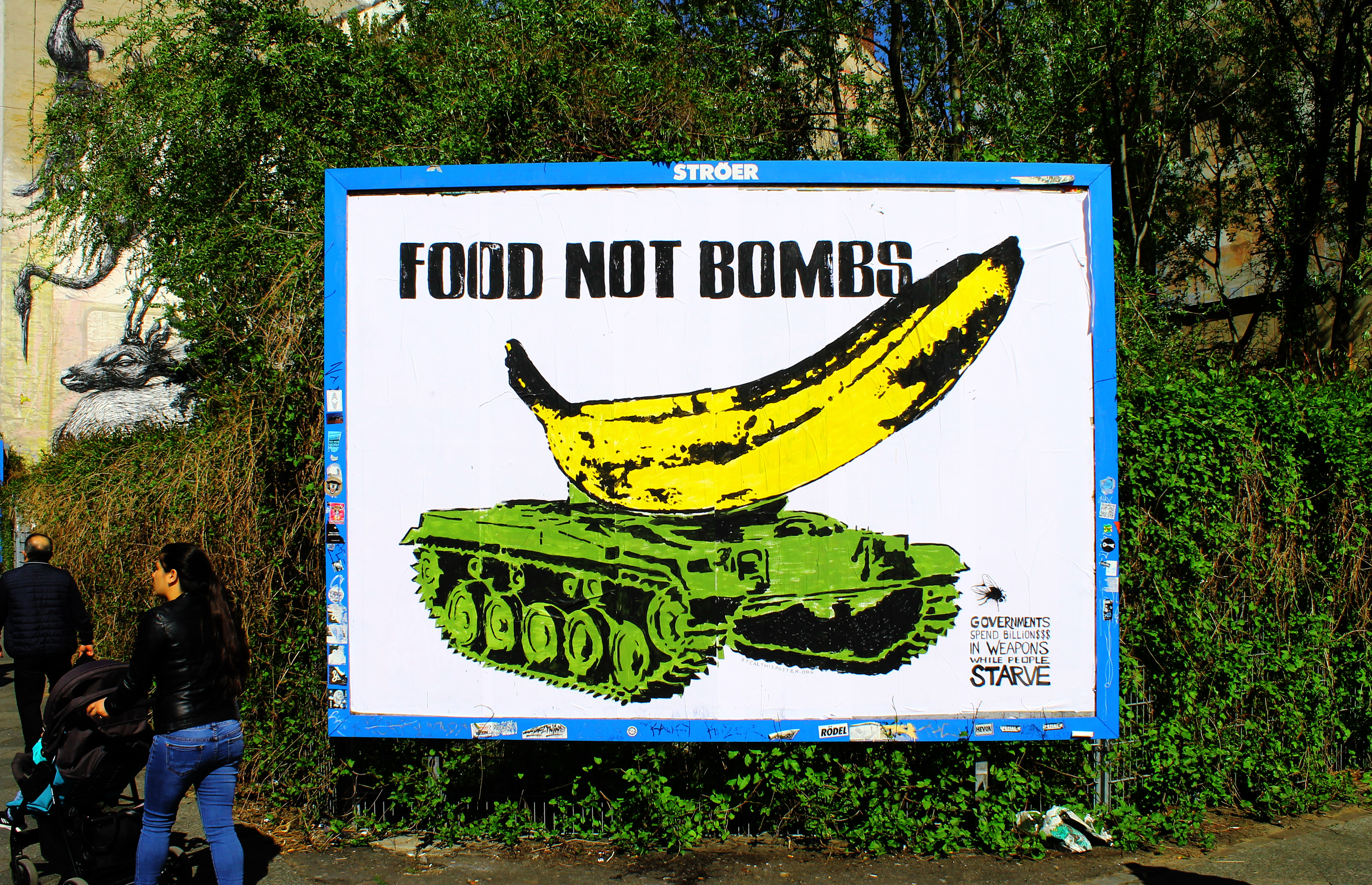
"Food Not Bombs" is a network of collectives that recover surplus food from grocery stores and create vegan and vegetarian food to share with those needy."

Greg Bloom of Bread for the City expressed concern over the health value of donated food, saying that "almost half of what comes to us in any given food drive just doesn’t meet our nutritional standards".

Contemporary food drives often work towards a radical approach to food provisions and aid. Organizations like "Food Not Bombs" pair vegan and vegetarian food provisions to those in need with a radical political agenda. The organization protests the military industrial complex, a phenomenon that fuels wars and usurps almost half of all tax money. According to the organization, the tax money utilized for war could fuel better social infrastructure to provide food aid to all who need a cushion of support.

== Largest food drive ==
The largest food drive by a non-charitable organization in 24 hours was set by the North Carolina School of Science and Mathematics Food drive. It collected 559,885 pounds of food in Durham, North Carolina, USA, on March 5, 2011.

== See also ==
- Bake sale
- Blood drive
- Pending Meal
- Toy drive
