= George Floyd protests in New York (state) =

2020 civil unrest after the murder of George Floyd

- Part of George Floyd protests
- Date: May 28, 2020 – July 2020 (1 month and 3 days)
- Location: New York, United States
- Caused by: Police brutality; Institutional racism against African Americans; Reaction to the murder of George Floyd; Economic, racial and social inequality
- New York cities with protests of 100 people or more

This is a list of protests in New York following the murder of George Floyd in 2020.

== List of protests in New York ==
=== Central New York ===
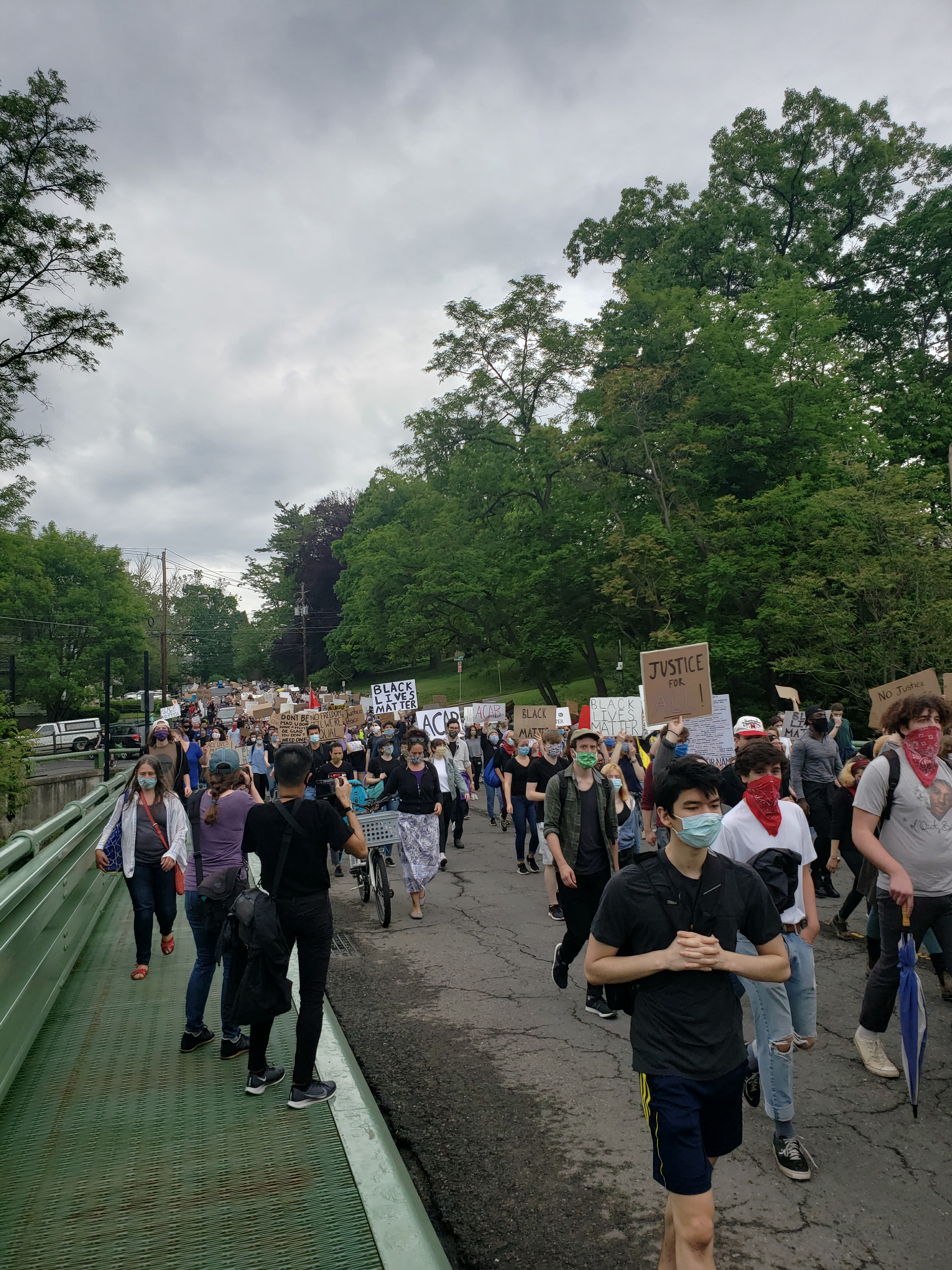
Protest in Ithaca on June 3

- Auburn: 200 peaceful protesters marched through the streets of Auburn on May 31.
- Baldwinsville: A peaceful protest and march occurred in the town of Baldwinsville on June 3. Students and parents were among the hundred or so protesters
- Binghamton: Nearly 1000 people marched from Binghamton High School to Recreation Park on May 31. Only 200 were expected.
- Clinton: About 200 silent protesters gathered in Clinton on June 5 to protest the murder of George Floyd.
- Cooperstown: On June 7, approximately 500 people peacefully protested at the Otsego County Courthouse, where a series of speakers addressed the systemic racism experienced by the black community.
- Delhi: More than 700 people rallied in Courthouse Square and held a socially distanced protest along the length of Main Street on June 6.
- Elmira: On June 6, more than 2,000 people gathered downtown to support the Black Lives Matter movement. A sign protesting Floyd's murder was also displayed on the digital billboard outside First Arena.
- Hamilton: Hundreds of protesters marched on the Village Green in Hamilton on June 4.
- Homer: On June 6, hundreds of people gathered in Durkee Park in Homer and marched to the Village Green to protest racial injustice and support Black Lives Matter.
- Ithaca: On May 31, hundreds gathered on the Ithaca Commons in solidarity with the nationwide protests. A line of protesters outside of the Ithaca Police Department blocking the intersection of Cayuga Street and Clinton Street was broken by cars trying to pass on June 1, hurting two protesters in the process. On June 3, hundreds of members of the Cornell University community and a total of nearly 1,000 people gathered on Cornell Central Campus marched to the Ithaca Police Department. A secondary march organized by high school students across the city joined with the larger group on the Ithaca Commons.
- Livingston Manor: Local teenagers organized a march of hundreds down Main Street on June 6.
- Oneonta: 500 peaceful protesters gathered in Muller Plaza in Oneonta on May 31. Only a handful were expected.
- Oswego: On May 31, a gathering of several hundred people happened at the Oswego City Hall, organized by Accept Oswego. Several people gave speeches about their experiences before the protesters marched through the city. The march went from the city hall down the west side of the town, ending at the historical, Sheldon Hall, located on the campus of SUNY Oswego.
- Syracuse: Hundreds gathered downtown for the second straight day on May 31. On June 6 the Syracuse chapter of Black Lives Matter held a rally at the City Hall which was attended by over 2000 protesters. At approximately 2:40 a local group known as Last Chance for Change led a peaceful march of 500+ people around downtown Syracuse until 5pm.
- Utica: Hundreds of protesters, including U.S. Representative Anthony Brindisi, marched in Kendall Park and Oneida Square on May 31.

=== Hudson Valley ===
- Albany: Between May 30–31, a large rally organized by Citizen Action peacefully protested with a "solidarity walk" that began at Townsend Park. Demonstrations turned violent as the evening progressed, with the center of the violence occurring around the South Station police precinct. Protesters set fire to a tractor trailer, vandalized, broke into, and in some cases looted several banks and south-end/downtown stores. Protesters shot fireworks and threw objects at police later that night. Nine were arrested for charges ranging from second-degree riot and second-degree attempted assault to unlawful assembly. Four of the arrested were from outside of Albany.
- Amsterdam: On June 7, hundreds gathered in Amsterdam in front of the city's public safety building to protest police brutality.
- Beacon: On June 1, a peaceful protest took place that was attended by hundreds of people, including Syracuse Orange basketball player Elijah Hughes who grew up in the city.
- Carmel: On June 3, hundreds of high school students and others came from Carmel and the surrounding towns of Brewster and Mahopac for a Black Lives Matter protest outside of the Putnam County Courthouse.
- Catskill: More than 1,000 people gathered in Catskill from all around Greene County on June 4. Protesters marched peacefully from the Middle School down Main Street, across the Catskill Creek, and to the Greene County Government Building.
- Clifton Park: A gathering of 400 protesters in Clifton Common in Clifton Park on June 8 demanded police reform and accountability. The protesters marched a mile from the Common to the State Trooper barracks and chanted slogans and held up signs. There was an 8-minute 46-second moment of silence to honor George Floyd.
- Cornwall: On June 4, hundreds gathered in Cornwall to protest systemic racism and the murder of George Floyd. The mayor of Cornwall, Brendan Coyne, took a knee with the protesters.
- Delmar: Hundreds gathered in Delmar on June 8 to protest police brutality. Peaceful protesters marched down Delaware Avenue holding signs.
- Dobbs Ferry: Hundreds of peaceful protesters gathered at the Waterfront Park in Dobbs Ferry to protest the murder of George Floyd and racial injustice on June 4. Some dozen speakers including state Senator Andrea Stewart-Cousins spoke to crowds about systemic racial issues.
- Goshen: Several hundred people protested police brutality in Goshen on June 5. The protest began at 4 P.M. in Church Park, by which time 150 people had already gathered. A few hundred more people arrived afterwards. Organizers say they were “shocked” to see how many people came to support a Black Lives Matter protest in a predominantly white town.
- Kingston: Demonstrators marched from Academy Green to Kingston City Hall on May 30.
- Monroe: About 700 peaceful protesters attended a "Black Lives Matter" protest at the Monroe Ponds at 6:00 P.M. on May 31. This was the largest protest in the town's almost four hundred-year history.
- Montgomery: About 500 people marched through Montgomery on June 9 in solidarity with the Black Lives Matter Movement.
- Monticello: 300 protesters gathered in front of the Sullivan County Courthouse in Monticello to protest racial injustice and the murder of George Floyd by Minneapolis police.
- Mount Vernon: A large crowd turned out in Mount Vernon on June 1 to peacefully protest the murder of George Floyd. The protest lasted approximately an hour and was facilitated by local police, who handed out water bottles.
- Nanuet: Over 300 peaceful protesters attended an "I Can't Breathe" protest in Rockland County.
- New Paltz: Hundreds of protesters peacefully marched in New Paltz on May 30.
- New Rochelle: A diverse crowd of approximately 2,000 people marched in New Rochelle to the City Hall on June 3 to protest the murder of George Floyd, racial inequality, and police brutality. The crowd included famed Yankees pitcher and New Rochelle resident Mariano Rivera
- Niskayuna: On June 7, hundreds protested outside the Niskayuna Town hall and Police Department for police reform and racial justice.
- Nyack: Peaceful demonstrations took place in the village on June 1.
- Ossining: Approximately 3,000–4,000 people gathered peacefully in Ossining on June 5 for racial justice and unity following the murder of George Floyd by Minneapolis Police.
- Peekskill: A rally of 100 or more was held at the city's Riverfront Green Park and another in front of the city's police station and court on May 30.
- Pelham: Over a hundred Pelham residents gathered in Wolfs Lane Park for a vigil and protest on June 2.
- Pine Bush: Hundreds marched through Pine Bush to protest police brutality on June 10.
- Port Chester: Thousands marched through Port Chester on June 7 for a Black Lives Matter rally.
- Poughkeepsie: On June 1, over 250 community members gathered on the sidewalks on Mill Street to honor George Floyd in a candlelight vigil and silent prayer.
- Rhinebeck: On June 2, almost 200 students gathered to write the names of victims of police shootings and police brutality on the village sidewalks. Additionally, the peaceful crowd chanted slogans in support of racial justice.
- Rye: On June 13, about 1,000 people gathered at Rye High School and marched around the town, stopping at the village green to hear speeches from activists.
- Scarsdale: On June 7, many hundreds of people gathered in Chase Park in Scarsdale to protest the murder of George Floyd and police brutality.
- Schenectady: Hundreds marched from a park to the Schenectady Police Department on May 31. The chief of police took a knee with them and wrote an essay for NBC News.
- Somers: About 350 demonstrators gathered outside of the Town Hall in Somers New York on June 9 to protest racial injustice. A large number of high school and college students were in the group, and voiced their frustrations about the presence of racism in Somers schools, especially Somers High School.
- Spring Valley: Approximately two thousand people gathered peacefully in Spring Valley to protest police brutality and racial injustice on June 5. The protesters marched on Main St. to Spring Valley Park.
- Tarrytown: On June 2, a crowd of several hundred residents and a number of local political figures gathered to protest in Patriot's Park.
- Troy: On June 7, around 11,000 protesters gathered at Riverfront Park for a peaceful rally and march.
- Wallkill: On June 7, around 400 peaceful protesters, marched from the government center on to Route 211, shutting it down in one direction for about four hours. The protest was organized after residents were angered by racist remarks made by the former Fire Chief, Charles Healy. The former chief referred to protesters as "pavement apes". Healy was also stripped of his rank.
- Warwick: Two peaceful protests took place in Warwick protesting the murder of George Floyd and police brutality. The first one, held on June 2, attracted 150 people. The first protest was threatened with violence by white supremacists on social media, but none occurred. The threat is under investigation. The second, held on June 4, had several hundred.
- Washingtonville: Several hundred gathered in Washingtonville on June 7 to protest racial injustice by police and the murder of George Floyd.
- West Point / Highland Falls: About 300 protesters, including former West Point instructors and veterans, gathered on June 13 to show support for Black Lives Matter and to voice their anger with President Trump's controversial decision to give the commencement address at West Point during the COVID-19 outbreak. Cadets were ordered by the president to stay quarantined for two weeks in their dormitories so that the President could give a speech to the graduating class. Many suspected that this was simply for a photo-op or a campaign ad. Protesters marched through Highland Falls and gathered outside the gates of West Point. In addition, several boats on the Hudson River displayed large anti-Trump signs.
- White Plains: On May 29, a vigil was held where hundreds of demonstrators chanted, carried signs and called for justice.
- Yonkers: Around 1,000 people took to Yonkers streets on June 1 to protest.

=== Long Island ===
- Babylon: On June 14, hundreds gathered for two Black Lives Matter protests in Babylon Village, which eventually united into one larger protest.
- Bay Shore: Thousands marched through downtown Bay Shore on June 7, walking from the Dr. George S. King Park Gazebo to the Bay Shore Commons, back through Main Street, then to the Bay Shore-Brightwaters Library.
- Brentwood: Hundreds gathered along Crooked Hill Road in Brentwood for a Black Lives Matter protest on May 30. Around 150 people marched from Central Islip LIRR and Brentwood LIRR to converge in a show of unity for BLM.
- Bridgehampton: Southampton Police estimate approximately 1,000 protesters marched along Montauk Parkway, which police had shut down on June 2.
- Bellport: Almost 1,000 protesters gathered at the Four Corners of Bellport Village on June 6, marching two miles up Station Rd to the Royal Oak Diner, where a moment of silence was observed.
- Central Islip: On June 10, around 1,000 protesters gathered in front of the County Courthouse. They voiced the importance of voting for change.
- Cherry Grove: 80-100 people marched through downtown Cherry Grove on June 6, pausing for a moment of silence.
- Coram: On June 12, dozens of protesters gathered and marched along Middle Country Road in Coram.
- Commack: Hundreds of protesters gathered along the Jericho Turnpike on June 1.
- East Meadow: On June 12, nearly 100 protesters marched. Three were arrested, but video shows entrapment committed by a team of police officers.
- Farmingville: On June 11, dozens attended a solidarity march in Farmingville, organized by 2017 Sachem graduates.
- Fire Island Pines: On June 7, nearly 500 protesters gathered on the beach in Fire Island Pines, lining up in a chain of protesters that stretched nearly the entire length of Fire Island Pines. Donations were collected for Black Lives Matter.
- Freeport: 500 people gathered at the Freeport LIRR station in support of Black Lives Matter on June 7. They then marched along Sunrise Highway, shutting down parts of the highway. The protesters then continued into Merrick.
- Glen Cove: Hundreds of protesters peacefully marched through Glen Cove and Sea Cliff at around 3:30 PM on Sunday, June 7.
- Great Neck: On June 8, hundreds of protesters gathered at Grace Avenue Park and marched down Middle Neck Road.
- Greenlawn: Hundreds of protesters marched from Greenlawn to the Suffolk County Police Second Precinct on June 6.
- Greenport: Over 500 people gathered at Greenport's Clinton Memorial A.M.E. Zion Church
- Hampton Bays: On June 14, hundreds of protesters gathered at Hampton Bays LIRR, followed by a march, despite concerns of an appearance by the KKK, known to have a presence in the area.
- Hempstead: On June 6, hundreds of protesters gathered for two hours and marched down Front Street.
- Huntington: Hundreds marched through Huntington to protest police brutality on June 1. In addition, protesters showed their displeasure with a local restaurant, Tutto Pazzo, whose owner made racist remarks towards the protesters.
- Islip: On June 9, dozens gathered outside Islip Town Hall for a Black Lives Matter protest organized by Joette Olds, a 12-year-old inspired to organize a protest after attending West Islip's.
- Lindenhurst: Black Lives Matter activists and pro-police counterprotesters met at Babylon Town Hall on July 19, where a fight broke out and three arrests were made.
- Long Beach: On June 2, about 200 people protested outside City Hall.
- Massapequa Park: Approximately 4,000 peaceful protesters marched down Park Boulevard on June 4.
- Merrick: On June 2, police blocked a peaceful protest of hundreds on Merrick Road. Eventually they relented and let the marchers pass. Five days later, two officers were injured and 11 protesters were arrested after a protest blocked off the Meadowbrook State Parkway.
- Mineola: On June 1, about 2,500 people marched through Mineola and Garden City around the Nassau County Executive Building and Nassau Police Headquarters. Police presence was heavy but the march was peaceful.
- Montauk: On June 5, approximately 150 surfers gathered in Montauk for a Paddle Out, a respectful gesture in the surf community, for George Floyd and other victims of police brutality.
- Oyster Bay: On June 12, about 150 protesters rallied in front of Oyster Bay Town Hall.
- Patchogue: On June 1, hundreds gathered at Capital One Bank Plaza to support Black Lives Matter.
- Peconic: On June 3, hundreds gathered at Jean Cochran Park in Peconic, followed by a march down Peconic Lane toward Southold Police Headquarters in Southold
- Plainview: On May 31, a few hundred demonstrated along South Oyster Bay Road while Nassau County Police looked on.
- Port Jefferson Station: On June 1, about 1,000 protesters marched through Port Jefferson Station to show support for Black Lives Matter.
- Port Jefferson: On June 18, more than 200 protesters marched through downtown Port Jefferson.
- Riverhead: On May 31, over 300 people chanted and demonstrated at Stotzky Park in Suffolk County.
- Rocky Point: On June 12, well over 100 protesters gathered along Route 25A in Rocky Point.
- Sag Harbor: On June 5, more than 450 people gathered in downtown Sag Harbor at John Steinbeck Park, followed by a march to the center of the Sag Harbor-North Haven Bridge, and back down Main Street, where protesters briefly laid down in the position in which George Floyd was restrained.
- Sayville: On June 7, over 3,500 people gathered at the Common Ground, before marching down Candee Avenue, across Elm Street and through Sayville Marina Park, and up Colton & Collins Ave back to the Common Ground.
- Shelter Island: On June 14, nearly 1,000 people stretched from Wilson Circle along the east side of Route 114 to Thomas Street, in what was described as the largest demonstration in memory on Shelter Island.
- Shirley: A "big" protest took place in Long Island on June 1. No arrests were made, but portions of the William Floyd Parkway and the Montauk Highway were closed.
- Smithtown: On June 9, a huge crowd of 2,000 people gathered in Smithtown to protest police brutality. The crowd shut down much of the roads surrounding the train station.
- West Islip: Hundreds of protesters gathered on Higbie Lane on June 1. Organizers asked participants to bring donations for a food drive.
- Westbury: On June 14, 100 protesters marched down Old Country Road in Westbury.

=== New York City ===
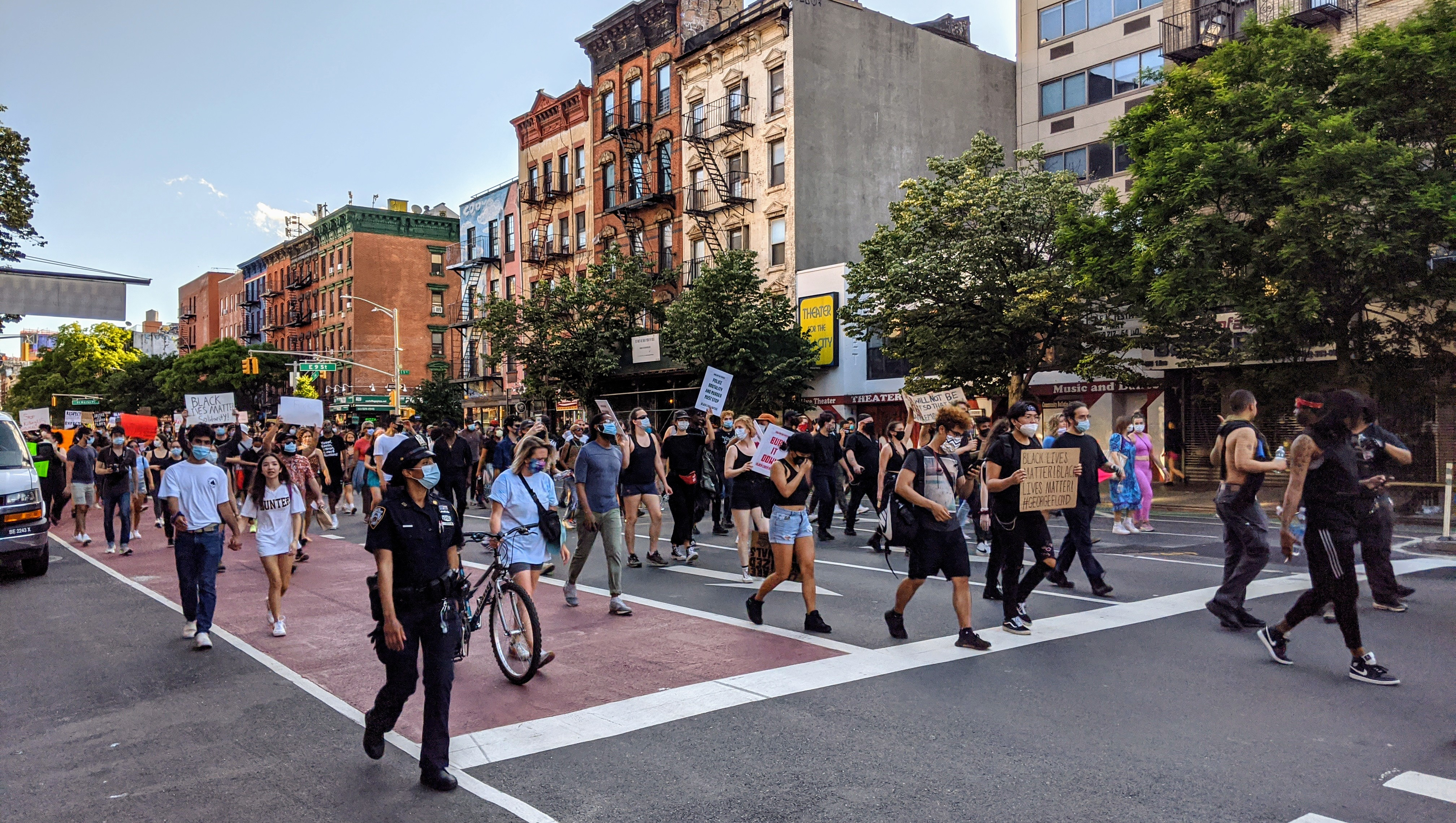
A march in Manhattan on May 30

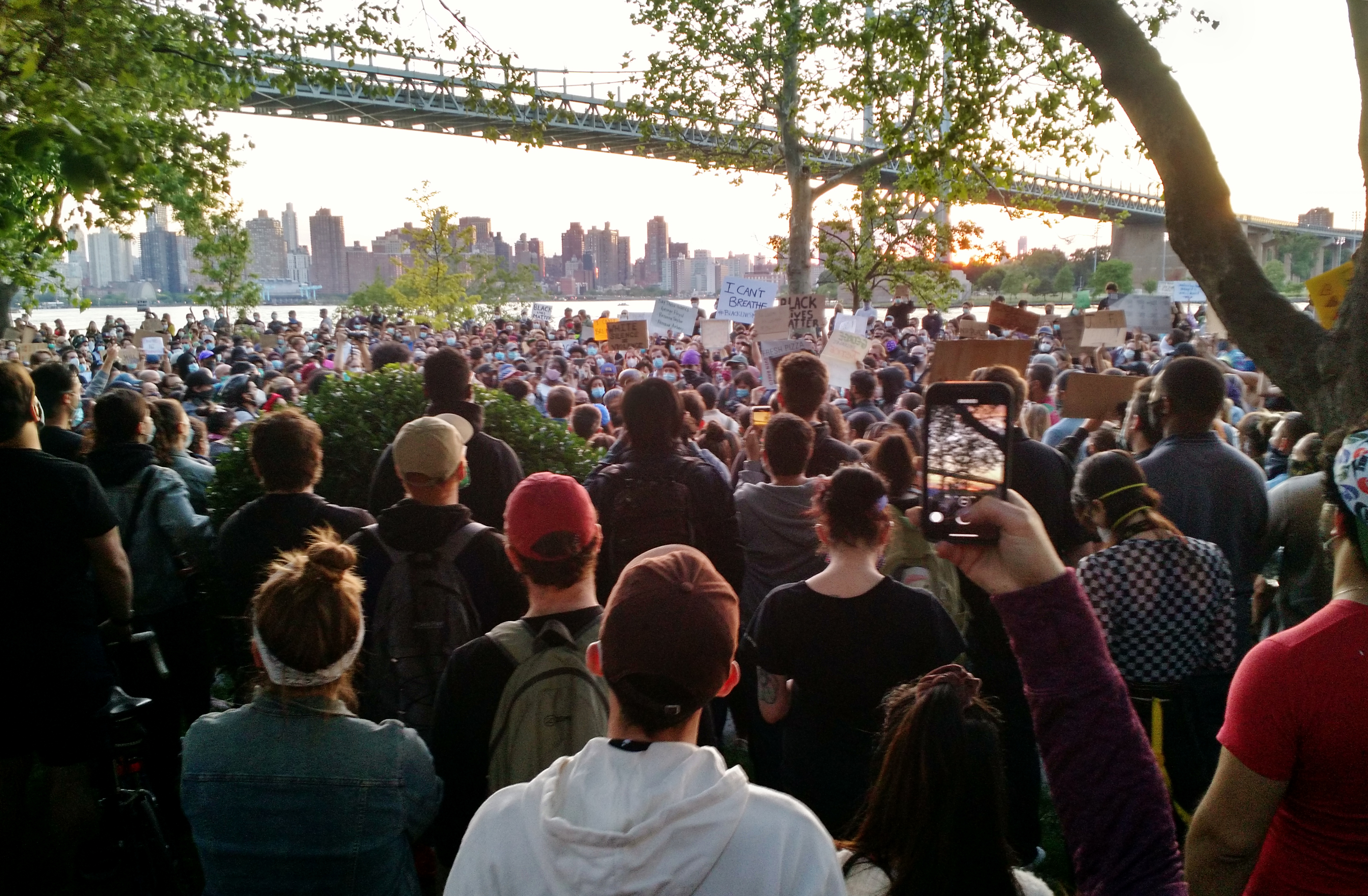
A George Floyd vigil at Astoria Park, Queens, on June 1

Nearly 100 protesters assembled in Union Square on May 28; in addition, 72 protesters were arrested and several police officers were lightly injured. Protesters marched to City Hall and shut down traffic in Lower Manhattan. The following day, May 29, peaceful protests resumed around Foley Square in Manhattan, but later protesters clashed with police at Barclays Center in Brooklyn and demolished two police vehicles in the Fort Greene neighborhood. Governor Andrew Cuomo spoke with New York City Mayor Bill de Blasio and announced an independent review, done by Attorney General Letitia James, of actions taken during the protests that occurred on May 29. In Brooklyn, a video of a crowd of protesters clashing with two NYPD vehicles that appeared to accelerate and push a number of people was released.

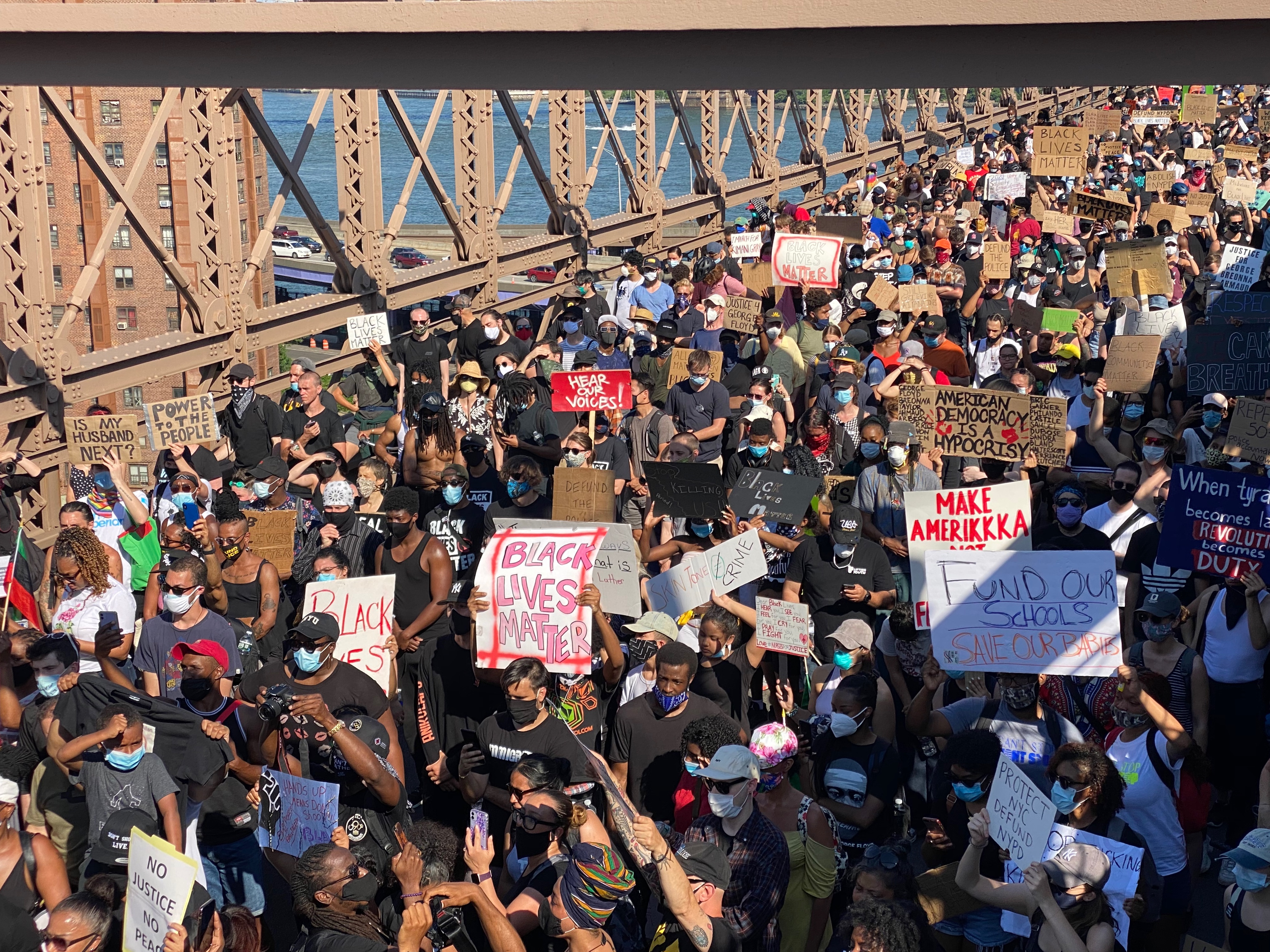
BLM protest on the Brooklyn Bridge on June 9

In the borough of Staten Island, Reverend Al Sharpton, Gwen Carr—the mother of Eric Garner, who was killed in 2014 from being chokeholded by police—and other community activists held a vigil for George Floyd on May 30.

On June 1, Governor Cuomo and Mayor de Blasio declared an 11 pm curfew for New York City, to last until 5 a.m. the next morning, the first since the Harlem riot of 1943, which followed a white police officer shooting an African American soldier. The next day, a curfew from 8 p.m. to 5 a.m. was announced, until June 7.

=== North Country ===
- Canton: Saturday, June 6, in addition to a multitude of similar protests around the North Country, protesters gathered in Canton to take a knee for nine minutes, in protest of the police officer who put his knee on George Floyd's neck for about the same amount of time.
- Elizabethtown: On June 5, about one hundred people joined in a rally against hate, and police brutality. The rally was peaceful, despite some heckling from people outside the protest. The Essex County Sheriff, David Reynolds was in attendance, and spoke out against the murder of George Floyd, saying "what happened to Mr. Floyd was wrong". In addition, he said that he fully supports all peaceful protests, and protesters around the country.
- Glen Falls: More than 2,000 peaceful protesters marched in City Park in Glens Falls on June 5 to protest the murder of George Floyd and police violence. This comes after another protest earlier on May 31 which had 300 people in attendance (The population of the entire town is approximately 14,000 people). The mayor, Daniel L. Hall, was also in attendance, making a speech along with other community organizers and protesters. Warren County Sheriff Jim LaFarr described the event as energetic, peaceful, and positive.
- Gloversville: On June 2, a crowd of protesters gathered outside City Hall to demand justice for George Floyd. Similar to protests in Johnstown and in front of the Fulton Sheriff's Department, the Gloversville protest was a silent gathering. These protests were all organized by the same person, Gloversville resident Lashawn Hawkins.
- Johnstown: On June 1, hundreds peacefully protested in front of the Johnstown City Hall in support of Black Lives Matter.
- Keene Valley: On May 31, around one hundred fifty people showed up to protest police brutality and the murder of George Floyd. The protest was peaceful, and all the people in attendance wore masks and practiced social distancing.
- Ogdensburg: Hundreds showed up for a protest in Ogdensburg on June 1.
- Plattsburgh: On June 6, hundreds of people gathered at Trinity Park, in the City of Plattsburgh, to march in protest of the murder of George Floyd, and police brutality in general. The march went from the park to a field across from the police precinct. Upon reaching the precinct, the protesters knelt in silence for nine minutes, about the same amount of time Derek Chauvin had his knee on Floyd's neck. The march was publicly supported by the Mayor of Plattsburgh, Colin Read, who was in attendance.
- Potsdam: June 2, around one thousand protesters took to the streets of Potsdam, New York, for a peaceful protest. The focus was the murder of George Floyd, by Derek Chauvin, and police violence, but also the issue black students had with regards to white students' use of Confederate flags. Due to the large size of the protest, there were concerns over the spread of Coronavirus from local officials.
- Saranac Lake: Roughly five hundred people gathered at Riverside Park on June 3, in a peaceful protest organized by the High Peaks chapter of The Democratic Socialists of America. Despite the peaceful nature of the protest, there were some who were not supportive, some going so far as to make threats against protesters. One such man, a nineteen year old named Rylan Christy, was arrested, after posting on social media that he planned to shoot protesters.
- Schuylerville: Over a hundred people gathered in Schuylerville on June 9 to march in support of Black Lives Matter.
- Watertown: Hundreds of peaceful protesters gathered in Watertown for a Black Lives Matter protest on June 8.

=== Western New York ===
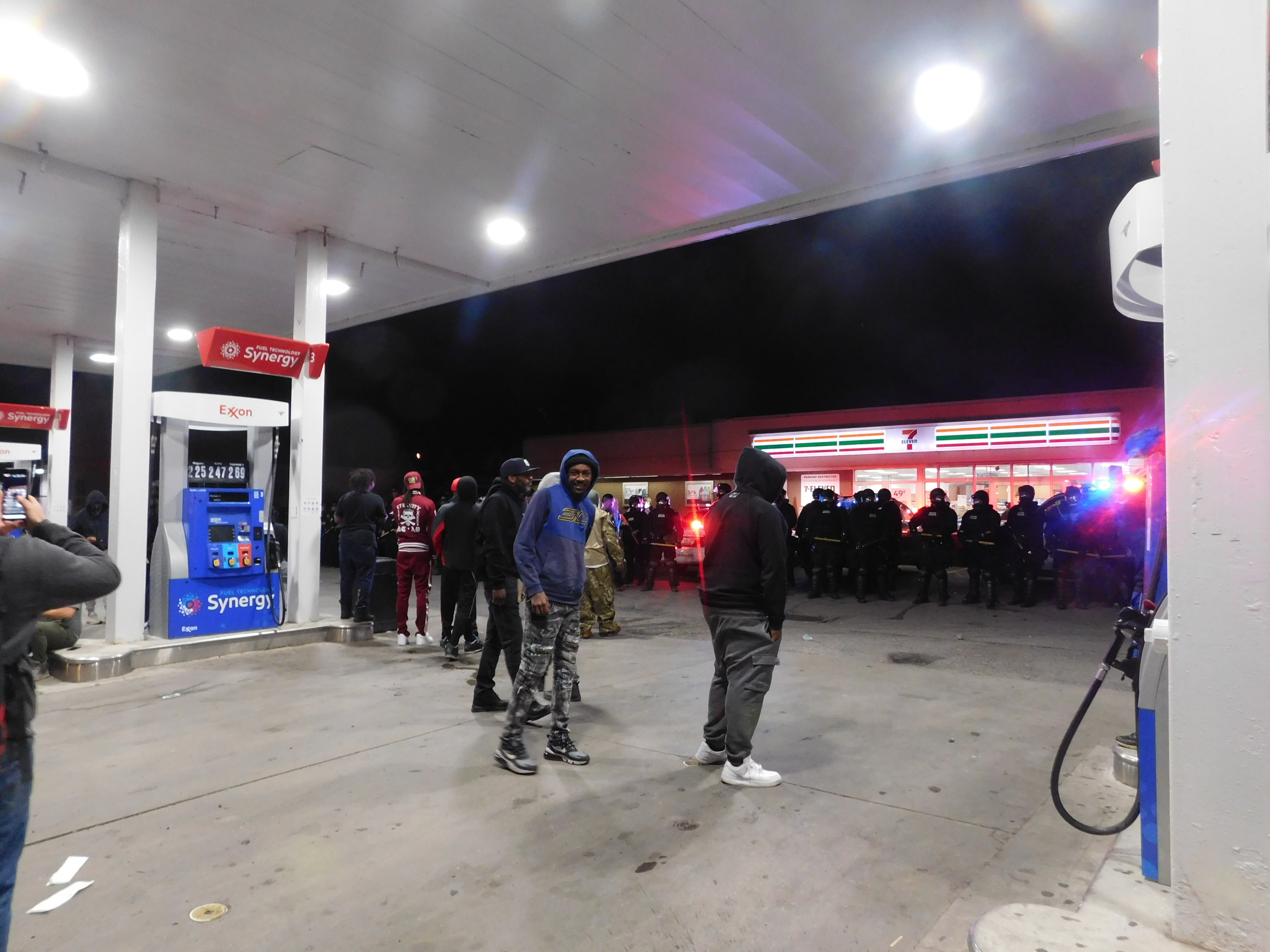
Protesters stand-off with police at a 7-Eleven in Buffalo

- Batavia: On June 7, peaceful protesters marched to protest both police brutality and racial injustice. Protesters started to gather around 8:00AM at City Hall, marched to the Batavia Police Department and the Genesee County Jail, then circled back to City Hall by 11:40AM.
- Buffalo: On May 30, a crowd of over a thousand people peacefully protested at City Hall, and the federal courthouse. However these protests escalated toward the evening hours. Erie County Executive Mark Poloncarz issued a countywide state of emergency and curfew effective from 10:30PM until 7:00AM for all of Erie County. There was a small fire after 20-year-old Courtland Renford threw a green basket with a box on fire inside a City Hall tax office. Mayor Byron Brown condemned the violence and called Renford an 'idiot'. The following day, on May 31, another curfew was issued effective from 9:00PM until 6:00AM. Various degrees of protesting and rioting continued the following days, causing a curfew to be issued for only the city of Buffalo from 8:00PM to 5:00AM every night from June 2 to June 7. Police officers pushed 75-year-old Martin Gugino, causing him to fall to the ground, which resulted in serious injury. In April 2021, a woman was indicted on two counts of assault in the first degree from driving into a police barricade injuring two officers at a protest on June 1.
- Canandaigua: Hundreds marched peacefully from Commons Park to the Police Station in Canandaigua on June 3. People chanted “Black Lives Matter” and demanded accountability from police.
- Hornell: Approximately 150 peaceful demonstrators gathered in Hornell on June 5 to protest the murder of George Floyd by Minneapolis police.
- Jamestown: Approximately 200 protesters voiced their frustrations about racial injustice and the murder of George Floyd in Jamestown on May 31. Many participants were voicing their concerns about the Jamestown Police Department, the majority of whose officers do not even reside in Jamestown.
- Niagara Falls: A smattering of protesters carrying "I Can't Breathe" signs gathered near the old Niagara Falls Police Station on May 31. A flyer circulated that claimed the protesters were going to burn the historic building down. Members of the Niagara Falls Peacekeepers along with the police blocked demonstrators' access to the location.
- Olean: About 300 people gathered in Olean to peacefully protest the murder of George Floyd and police brutality on May 31. Two minor fights were reported.
- Rochester: Following a peaceful protest from 1PM to 4PM in downtown Rochester on May 30, chaos erupted to the point of cars, including police cruisers, being set on fire around the Public Safety building and other parts of the city, with police responding with tear gas and pepper spray. Violence and looting also broke out in the suburb of Irondequoit. Monroe County Executive Adam Bello and Rochester mayor Lovely Warren issued a state of emergency and set a county-wide curfew for 9 PM. Bello, Warren, and Rochester police chief La'Ron Singletary claimed that the violence was incited by "professional protesters" and "anarchists" from outside the city.
