= George Brager =

George A. Brager (1923 – 2003) was professor of social work and dean of the school of social work at Columbia University. He has been a chief program planner of delinquency prevention and anti-poverty programs.

Brager earned his bachelor's degree in social work from the College of the City of New York in 1941 and a master's from the University of Pennsylvania School of Social Work in 1948. He was awarded a Ph.D. in 1968 from New York University, where he studied at the center for Human Relations and Community Studies.

He joined Columbia in 1965 as assistant professor; he became full professor in 1969. He was appointed dean in 1981, in which position he served until 1986. He succeeded Mitchell Ginsberg as dean.

A consultant to numerous public agencies in his more than 30-year career, Brager was from 1960 to 1965 chief planner and co-director of Mobilization for Youth, New York, a program for prevention and control of delinquency that became the prototype for the federal poverty program. His scholarly work has been used in the fields of organizational change, development and administration, and in community organization.

Brager served as consultant to the Rockefeller Brothers Fund, Adelphi University Drug Prevention Program, Allegheny County Office of Mental Health and Mental Retardation, the Social and Rehabilitation Service of the Department of Health, Education and Welfare, the Model Cities Program of the Department of Housing and Urban Development, the Office of Economic Opportunity, Computer Applications Inc. and the Center for the Study of Unemployed Youth at New York University. For many years, Brager was on the Board and at the time of his death was chairman of the board of the Center for Urban Community Services, a nonprofit that provides integrated programs that link housing, health and social services for New York City's most vulnerable people.

== Publications ==
He was the author of 12 books listed in WorldCat.
