= ANAC =

ANAC may refer to:

== Civil aviation agencies ==
- Agence nationale de l'aviation civile (disambiguation), several French-speaking agencies
- Autorité Nationale de l'Aviation Civile, a government agency in Côte d'Ivoire
- National Civil Aviation Administration, an Argentine government agency
- National Civil Aviation Agency of Brazil, a Brazilian government agency
- National Institute of Civil Aviation of Portugal, a Portuguese government agency

== Other uses ==
- Association of Nurses in AIDS Care, a professional association
- Auckland Nuclear Accessory Company, a former New Zealand company
- Automatic number announcement circuit, a service for technicians to identify a telephone line
- National Anti-Corruption Authority (Italy) (A.N.AC.), an Italian administrative authority
