= Agence nationale de l'aviation civile =

Agence nationale de l'aviation civile may refer to:

- Agence nationale de l'aviation civile (Burkina Faso)
- Agence nationale de l'aviation civile du Bénin
- Agence nationale de l'aviation civile (Republic of the Congo)
- Agence nationale de l'aviation civile du Gabon
- Agence nationale de l'aviation civile du Mali
- National Civil Aviation Agency (Mauritania)
- Agence nationale de l'aviation civile (Niger)
- Agence nationale de l'aviation civile du Sénégal
- Agence nationale de l'aviation civile du Togo

== See also ==
- Agence Nationale de l'Aviation Civil (disambiguation)
