= 2021 Buffalo mayoral election =

- November 2, 2021
- Turnout: 40.3%
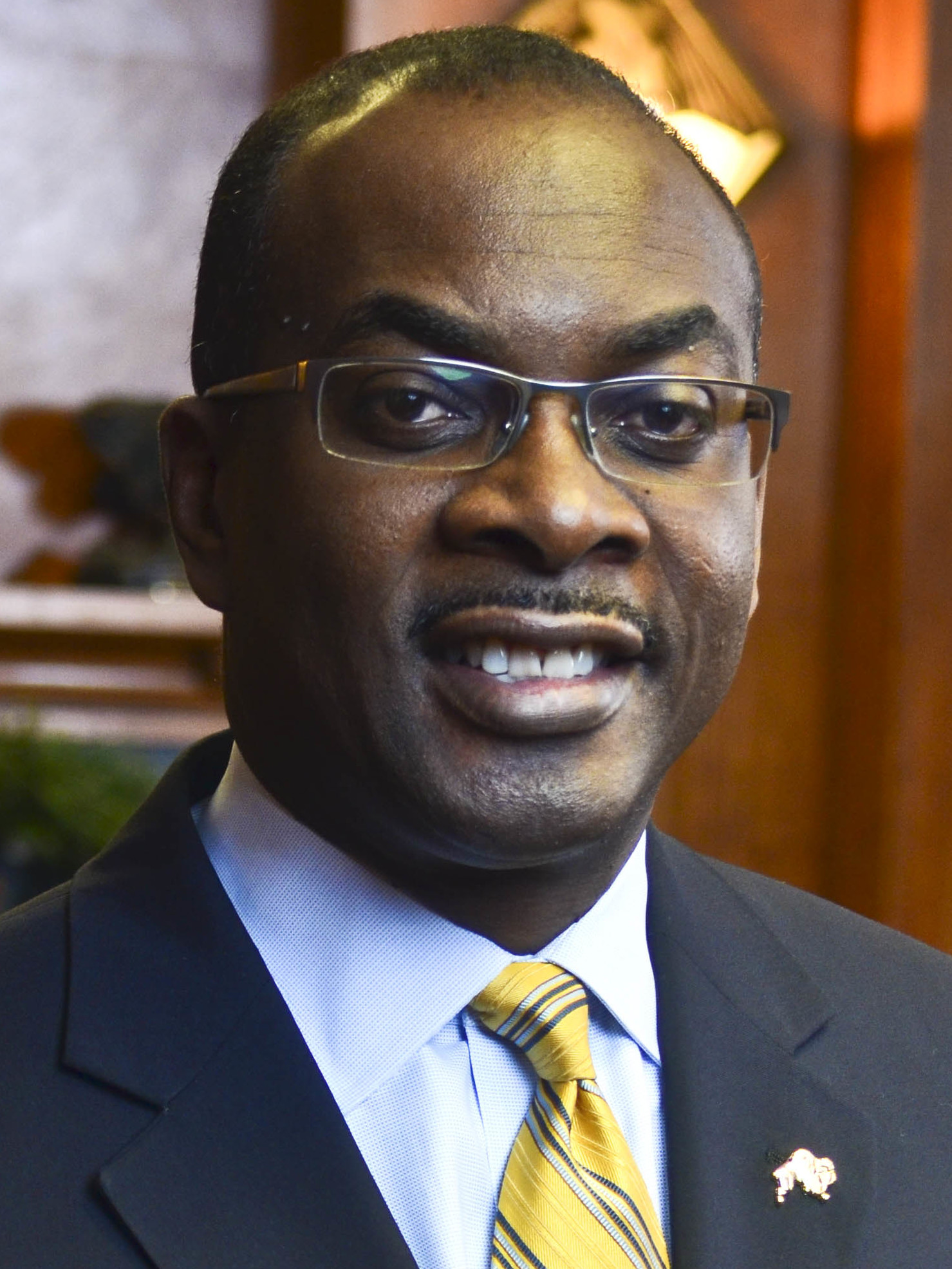

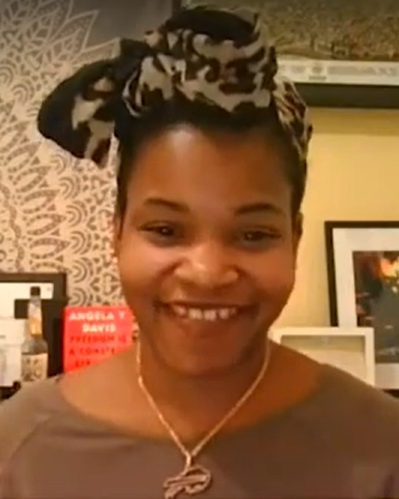
Nominee	Byron Brown (write-in)	India Walton
Party	Democratic	Democratic
Alliance		Working Families
Popular vote	38,108	25,806
Percentage	59.39%	40.22%
- Brown: 40–50% 50–60% 60–70% 70–80% 80–90% >90% Walton: 40–50% 50–60% 60–70% 70–80% 80–90% Tie: 40–50% 50% No votes
Mayor before election
Byron Brown
Democratic
Elected mayor
Byron Brown
Democratic

The 2021 Buffalo mayoral election was held on November 2, 2021. Democratic incumbent Byron Brown won re-election to a fifth term, defeating Democratic nominee India Walton through a write-in campaign. Brown's victory marked the first time since 1985 that Buffalo did not elect the Democratic nominee for mayor.

Four-time incumbent Democratic Mayor Byron Brown lost the June Democratic primary to India Walton, a political activist and nurse. Brown chose to run in the general election as a write-in candidate, and then attempted to obtain ballot access, but continued as a write-in when he was unable to secure a place on the ballot. The race attracted national attention as a proxy battle between progressives and moderates with Walton running as a socialist, and Brown running with moderate Democratic as well as Republican support. In addition to Brown, there were at least three other write-in candidates.

On the night of November 3, 2021, Brown declared his victory over Walton although tabulation of the write-in votes in Erie County (of which Buffalo is a part) would not commence until November 17. The day after the election, Walton released a statement stating that although a victory "seems unlikely," her campaign would not concede until all votes were counted. Brown's victory became official on November 19, 2021.

Brown's victory made him the longest serving Mayor of Buffalo once he began his fifth term on January 1, 2022, breaking the record held by James D. Griffin.

== Background ==
Byron Brown was elected as mayor of Buffalo, New York, in the 2005 mayoral election, becoming the first black mayor of Buffalo. He was reelected in the 2009 election after defeating common councilor Michael P. Kearns in the Democratic primary. He won reelection in the 2013 election. Brown defeated Comptroller Mark J. F. Schroeder in the Democratic primary and the general election in 2017. Brown's four previous terms as mayor made him the longest-serving mayor of Buffalo alongside James D. Griffin.

== Primary campaign ==
=== Democratic primary ===
Scott J. Wilson Jr., a nineteen-year-old who had worked for Comptroller Mark J. F. Schroeder and unsuccessfully ran for comptroller in 2017, announced his campaign for mayor on June 13, 2020, but he did not collect enough signatures to appear on the primary ballot. India Walton, a longtime member of Families Against Mandatory Minimums and 1199SEIU United Healthcare Workers East, executive director of the Fruit Belt Community Land Trust, and member of the Democratic Socialists of America, announced her campaign on December 13, 2020. Le’Candice Durham, a compliance clerk for Buffalo's 3-1-1 line, ran in the election.

Brown announced that he would seek reelection to a fifth term on February 25, 2021, through a video on Facebook. During the primary campaign his campaign spent $71,000, which was less than the $360,000 he had spent during the 2017 primary, he refused to participate in debates, despite having participated in two debates during the 2017 primary, and his greatest expense during the primary was $9,730 on lawn signs. Brown only turned in around 6,000 signatures to appear on the primary ballot which was less than the 20,000 he turned in in 2009, and the 15,000 he turned in in 2017.

Late in the primary, Walton's campaign received a boost when New York City Public Advocate Jumaane Williams endorsed her and headlined several fundraisers to support her campaign. Walton had previously received some local attention while active in the George Floyd protests, when she criticized Mayor Brown for his handling of the Buffalo police shoving incident.

Walton defeated Brown and Durham in the Democratic primary, but Brown did not immediately concede. After the primary Jeremy Zellner, the chair of the Erie County Democratic Committee, stated that the party was in support of Walton.

Results by city council district Walton: 40–50%; 50–60%; 60–70%; 70–80%; Brown: 40–50%; 50–60%; 60–70%

2021 Buffalo mayoral Democratic primary
Party	Candidate	Votes	%
Democratic	India Walton	11,132	51.85%
Democratic	Byron Brown (incumbent)	9,625	44.83%
Democratic	Le’Candice Durham	650	3.03%
Write-in		62	0.29%
Total votes		21,469	100.00%

==== Endorsements ====
India Walton

U.S. senators

- Bernie Sanders, Vermont (2007–present) (Independent)
- Chuck Schumer, New York (1999–present)
- Elizabeth Warren, Massachusetts (2013–present)
- Kirsten Gillibrand, New York (2009–present)

U.S. representatives

- Alexandria Ocasio-Cortez, NY-14 (2019–present)

State legislators

- Phara Souffrant Forrest, AD-57 (2021–present)
- Emily Gallagher, AD-50 (2021–present)
- Jessica González-Rojas, AD-34 (2021–present)
- Zohran Mamdani, AD-36 (2021–2025)
- Marcela Mitaynes, AD-51 (2021–present)
- Sean Ryan, AD-61 (2021–2025)

Local officials

- Jumaane Williams, New York City Public Advocate (2019–present)

Organizations

- Democratic Socialists of America
Byron Brown

Political parties

- Erie County Democratic Committee

Newspapers

- The Buffalo News

=== Working Families Party ===
The Working Families Party had supported Brown in the 2005, 2009, 2013, and 2017 mayoral elections. Walton won the nomination of the Working Families Party, but failed to formally accept the nomination in time for the filing deadline. So the Erie County Board of Elections ruled her ineligible to appear on the ballot with their nomination under the deadline rules. The Working Families Party raised over $230,000 to support India Walton notwithstanding.

=== Other candidates ===
Wilson attempted to appear on the general election ballot as an independent candidate, but his petition was challenged by the Erie County Board of Elections. His name did not appear on the general election ballot.

Carl Paladino, who previously served on the Buffalo Public Schools board of education and unsuccessfully ran in the 2010 gubernatorial election as a Republican, considered running as a write-in candidate, but would only have run if Brown did not continue his campaign in the general election. Paladino endorsed Brown in the general election, but withdrew his endorsement of Brown on August 26 and announced a boycott campaign instead, urging Buffalonians to neither vote for nor donate to Brown, Walton nor any other candidate.

Other write-in candidates included Independent attorney Benjamin Carlisle, Republican candidate for district 141 of the New York State Assembly in 2020 Jaz Miles, and Republican sports booking manager William O'Dell.

== General election ==
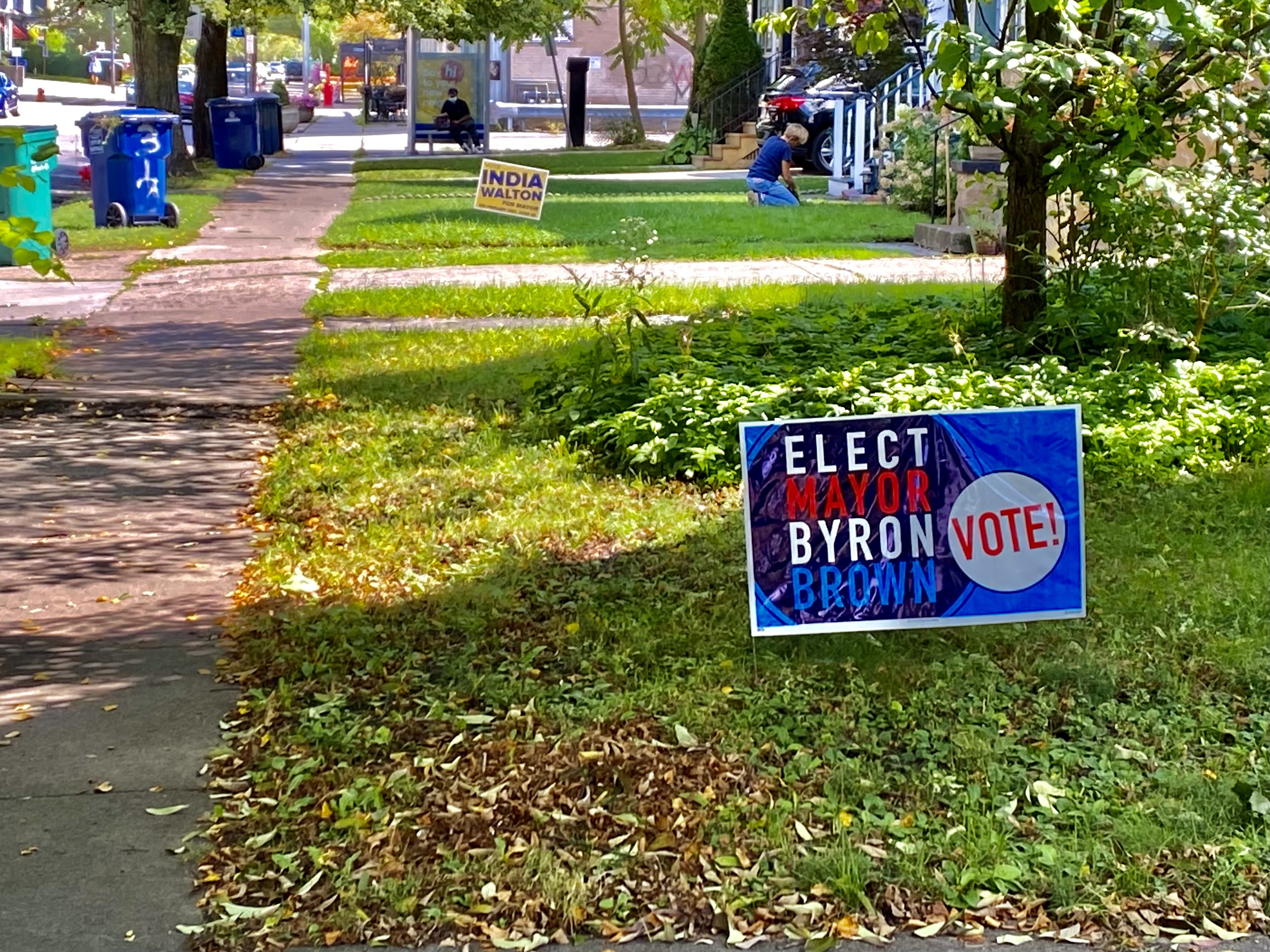
Dueling lawn signs for both Byron Brown and India Walton in a residential neighborhood, September 2021

Following Walton's defeat of Brown in the Democratic Party primary, Brown launched a write-in campaign for the general election. Brown's staffers staged a rally outside Sahlen Field days after the primary to encourage support for his general election write-in campaign. The president of the Buffalo Police Benevolent Association stated that Brown would have the support of the union if he ran as a write-in candidate. Brown announced on June 28, that he would run as a write-in candidate.

A majority of the members of the Buffalo Board of Education endorsed Walton on August 19, 2021. Board members Kathy Evans Brown, Hope Jay, Jennifer Mecozzi, Ann Rivera, and Lawrence Scott held a joint press conference to announce the endorsement. On August 30, 2021, Walton publicly stated her support for Starbucks employees' effort at unionization in Buffalo. In October 2021, Walton voiced support for elderly, veteran, and disabled tenants at Peace Bride Apartments fighting the owners of the apartments for lease renewals. Walton also spoke in favor of increased funding and maintenance for city parks at an event at Shoshone Park in October.

On August 19, The Buffalo News published an article on Walton, who was arrested in 2014 on a charge of second-degree harassment after Walton allegedly threatened to commit bodily harm to a fellow nurse at the Buffalo Children's Hospital. All charges against Walton were dismissed. The Buffalo News separately reported, on September 19, that Brown and his administration have been under investigation by federal authorities, including the F.B.I., for multiple allegations involving political donations and city government contracts since 2015. Many of Brown's close political advisers and employees have been interviewed and Steve Pigeon, a political operative who lobbied Brown's office on garbage contracts, pleaded guilty to arranging an illegal donation to the campaign of former Governor Andrew Cuomo, also a close ally of Brown. Brown has not been charged, but multiple investigations remain open.

Brown attempted to appear on the general election ballot through a petition and court challenge as an independent, with the party label Buffalo Party, but ultimately lost the court cases and continued campaigning as a write-in. Brown was placed on the ballot by Judge John Sinatra, who had been appointed by president Donald Trump. Walton criticized the ruling and accused Sinatra of bias, pointing out that his brother is a regular contributor to Byron Brown's campaign. The Erie County Board of Elections and the Walton campaign appealed the decision, and on September 16, state and federal courts definitively took Brown off the November ballot. On September 17, the Board of Elections began printing general election ballots with Walton as the only listed candidate.

Brown's campaign accepted significant donations from individual Republicans and benefited from independent expenditures by the New York Republican Party, including mailers promoting his write-in campaign. Brown expressed openness to accepting Republican support, saying “I don't see a conflict of interest because we're in the general election . . . I'm appealing to every voter.” Brown accepted significant assistance in gathering signatures for his attempt at ballot access from Republican activists opposed to Walton, including Republican elected officials, members of the Erie County Republican Committee, and at least one member of local far-right organizations, as well as members of the Conservative, Independence and Libertarian parties. As part of his write-in campaign, Brown distributed "push stamps" with his name so that voters could simply stamp his name onto the ballot.

Governor Kathy Hochul declined to endorse a candidate in the race, despite Walton winning the Democratic nomination. On October 18, Jay Jacobs, Chair of the New York State Democratic Committee, restated his own refusal to endorse. He said that it is not a requirement for him to endorse every Democratic nominee. In a comparison that quickly drew controversy and condemnation, he used the example of not endorsing white supremacist former Grand Wizard of the Ku Klux Klan David Duke if he won the Democratic nomination for mayor of Rochester to explain his refusal to endorse Walton, who is African-American. Many prominent Democratic leaders in New York called for Jacobs to resign following his remarks, including Congresswoman Alexandria Ocasio-Cortez, State Senator Alessandra Biaggi, and Congressman Jamaal Bowman.

=== Debates ===
2021 Buffalo mayoral election general election debate
No.	Date	Host	Moderator	Link	Participants				
Key: P Participant A Absent N Non-invitee									
Key: P Participant A Absent N Non-invitee					Byron Brown	Benjamin Carlisle	India Walton	Jaz Miles	William O'Dell
1	September 9, 2021	Buffalo Association of Black Journalists; WUFO Radio	Al Vaughters		P	P	P	P	A
2	October 27, 2021	St. Joseph's Collegiate Institute	Ted Lina		P	P	P	N	N

=== Endorsements ===
India Walton

U.S. senators

- Kirsten Gillibrand, New York (2009-present)
- Bernie Sanders, Vermont (2007–present) (Independent)
- Chuck Schumer, Senate majority leader (2017–2021) from New York (1999–present)
- Elizabeth Warren, Massachusetts (2013–present)

U.S. representatives

- Jamaal Bowman, NY-16 (2021–2025)
- ~~Brian Higgins, NY-26 (2005–2024)~~ (rescinded endorsement)
- Alexandria Ocasio-Cortez, NY-14 (2019–present)

State legislators

- Alessandra Biaggi, member of the New York State Senate from the 34th district
- Harvey Epstein, member of the New York State Assembly from the 74th district
- Emily Gallagher, member of the New York State Assembly from the 50th district
- Michael Gianaris, member of the New York State Senate from the 12th district and New York State Senate Deputy Majority Leader
- Jessica González-Rojas, member of the New York State Assembly from the 34th district
- Andrew Gounardes, member of the New York State Senate from the 22nd district
- Zohran Mamdani, member of the New York State Assembly from the 36th district
- Marcela Mitaynes, member of the New York State Assembly from the 51st district
- Jonathan Rivera, member of the New York State Assembly from New York's 149th State Assembly district (2021–present)
- Sean Ryan, member of the New York State Senate from the 60th district (2021–present)
- Phara Souffrant Forrest, member of the New York State Assembly from the 57th district
- Andrea Stewart-Cousins, member and Majority Leader of the New York State Senate
- Antoine Thompson, member of the New York State Senate (2007–2011) and Buffalo Common Council (2001–2007)

Local officials

- April Baskin, member of the Erie County Legislature from the 2nd district (2017–present), Chair of the Erie County Legislature (2019–present)
- Betty Jean Grant, member of the Erie County Legislature from the 2nd district (2007–2017)
- Brad Lander, member of the New York City Council and 2021 Democratic nominee for New York City Comptroller
- Mark Poloncarz, Erie County Executive (2012-present)
- Jumaane Williams, New York City Public Advocate (2019–present)
- Rasheed Wyatt, member of the Buffalo Common Council (2014–present)

Political parties

- Erie County Democratic Committee
- Working Families Party

Organizations

- Buffalo DSA
- Democracy for America
- Democratic Socialists of America
- Center for Popular Democracy
- EMILY's List
- The Gravel Institute
- MoveOn
- Neighborhood Assistance Corporation of America
- Our Revolution
- People's Action
- Run for Something

Labor unions

- ~~American Federation of Teachers – Buffalo Teachers Federation~~ (rescinded endorsement)
- International Alliance of Theatrical Stage Employees - Local 10
- New York State Nurses Association
- United Food and Commercial Workers Local One
- Workers United Upstate New York

Individuals

- Benny the Butcher, rapper
- Maurice Mitchell, National Director of the Working Families Party
- Cynthia Nixon, actress, activist and 2018 candidate for New York Governor in the Democratic Party primary
- Zephyr Teachout, attorney, author, law professor, and 2014 candidate for New York Governor in the Democratic Party primary
- Nina Turner, former Ohio State Senator, candidate for Congress, and 2020 national co-chair of the Bernie Sanders 2020 presidential campaign

Newspapers and other media

- The Buffalo Challenger
Byron Brown (write-in)

U.S. representatives

- Thomas Suozzi, NY-03 (2017–2023)

Statewide officials

- Dennis Vacco, former attorney general of New York (1995–1998), United States Attorney for the Western District of New York (1988-1993) (Republican)

State legislators

- Crystal Peoples-Stokes, member of the New York State Assembly (2003-present), Majority Leader of the New York State Assembly (2018-present)

Local officials

- Joel Giambra, executive of Erie County (2000–2007), city comptroller of Buffalo (1990–1999) (Republican)
- Joseph Golombek Jr., member of the Buffalo Common Council (1999–present)
- Anthony Masiello, mayor of Buffalo (1994–2005)
- Barbara Miller-Williams, city comptroller of Buffalo (2020–present)
- Anthony Nanula, Comptroller of Buffalo, New York (2000–2003)
- Larry Quinn, member-at-large of the Buffalo Public Schools Board of Education (2014–present)
- Christopher P. Scanlon, member of the Buffalo Common Council (2011–present)
- Ulysees O. Wingo Sr., member of the Buffalo Common Council (2015–present)

Labor unions

- AFL–CIO
- Amalgamated Transit Union – Local #1342
- American Federation of State, County and Municipal Employees – Local #815
- Buffalo Police Benevolent Association
- Civil Service Employees Association – Local 1,000
- International Alliance of Theatrical Stage Employees – Local 52, 121
- International Association of Bridge, Structural, Ornamental and Reinforcing Iron Workers – Local #6
- International Brotherhood of Teamsters Joint Council No. 46
- New York State Troopers Police Benevolent Association
- United Auto Workers – Local #6
- Western New York Communications Workers of America

Party officials

- Nick Langworthy, Chair of the New York Republican Party (2019–2023) (Republican)

Individuals

- Conway the Machine, rapper
- Jeremy Jacobs, billionaire businessman and chairman of Delaware North
- Douglas Jemal, real estate developer
- Robert E. Rich Jr., chairman and majority owner of Rich Products Corporation

Newspapers and other media

- The Buffalo News
- Panorama Hispano News
Declined to endorse

U.S. Representatives

- Brian Higgins, NY-26 (2005–2024) (previously endorsed Walton)

State executives

- Kathy Hochul, governor of New York (2021–present)
- Letitia James, attorney general of New York (2019–present)

Individuals

- Jay Jacobs, chair of the New York State Democratic Committee

=== Polling ===
Poll source	Date(s) administered	Sample size (Note: Key: A – all adults RV – registered voters LV – likely voters V – unclear)	Margin of error	Byron Brown (D)	India Walton (D)	Other	Undecided
Emerson College	October 22–23, 2021	539 (LV)	± 4.2%	54%	36%	4%	6%
co/efficient (R)	September 16–17, 2021	653 (LV)	± 3.8%	59% (Note: This survey explicitly lists Byron Brown as a named candidate in a head-to-head against India Walton, despite him not appearing on the ballot.)	28%	–	13%
Emerson College	August 7–8, 2021	862 (LV)	± 3.3%	50%	40%	2%	8%

=== Results ===
2021 Buffalo mayoral election
Party	Candidate	Votes	%
Democratic	Byron Brown (incumbent, write-in)	38,108	59.39
Democratic	India Walton	25,806	40.22
Independent	Ben Carlisle (write-in)	219	0.34
Republican	Jaz Miles (write-in)	23	0.04
Republican	William O'Dell (write-in)	8	0.01
Total votes		64,164	100%
Democratic hold			
