= Sore loser law =

Law in United States politics

In United States politics, a sore loser law is a law prohibiting the loser in a primary election from then running as an independent or representing another political party in the general election, thus basically blocking them from appearing on the general election ballot (though sometimes they may still run as a write-in candidate).

Some states accomplish the same goal by having simultaneous registration dates for the primary and the general election, while other states ban the practice by preventing candidates from cross-filing for multiple parties, or by having laws that explicitly ban the practice. Only the states of Connecticut and New York (which are currently the only states where Electoral fusion is legal and common) have neither a sore loser law nor simultaneous registration deadlines. Iowa had previously been among this group of states but implemented a sore loser law in 2021.

Richard Winger, a ballot researcher, believes that in most states these laws do not apply to presidential candidates.

== Constitutionality ==
Opponents have argued that sore loser laws constitute a violation of the Constitution, and have launched court challenges on those grounds. In August 2018, a federal judge sided with the North Carolina affiliate of the Constitution Party in agreeing that the retroactive application of the state's sore loser law was unconstitutional, as applied to the newly formed party.

== Notable sore loser candidacies ==
=== 1972 California elections ===
Two congressional candidates who lost their primaries in the 1972 elections in California challenged the validity of that state's sore loser law. The Supreme Court ruled against them, upholding the law, in Storer v. Brown.

=== 2006 Connecticut Senate election ===
In the 2006 Connecticut Democratic Senate primary, Ned Lamont defeated Joe Lieberman. However, because Connecticut was one of just three states without a sore loser law at the time (along with New York and Iowa), Lieberman was able to successfully run as an independent in the general election.

=== Gary Johnson case ===
In Michigan, one of the few states where this law applies to presidential elections as well, Gary Johnson was three minutes late to withdraw from the 2012 Republican Primary and was therefore on the ballot. As a result, he was denied ballot access as a Libertarian.

The Libertarian Party stated that since petitioning in Michigan is by party, not by person, a Texas businessman who is also named Gary Johnson would stand in and run for president as a Libertarian in Michigan, but a U.S. District judge denied their motion.

Gary Johnson was certified as a write-in candidate and received 7,774 votes in Michigan in the general election that year.

=== 2018 West Virginia Senate election ===
In the 2018 West Virginia Republican Senate primary, Don Blankenship came in third place with just under 20% of the vote. Blankenship declared his intention to run as a candidate for the Constitution Party. The Supreme Court of Appeals of West Virginia denied him ballot access after a lawsuit, but he remained eligible to run as a write-in candidate.

=== 2021 Buffalo mayoral election ===
In the 2021 Buffalo mayoral election, India Walton defeated incumbent mayor Byron Brown in the Democratic Primary on June 25 by 7.02%. On June 28, Brown announced on that he would run as a write-in candidate. Governor Kathy Hochul declined to endorse a candidate in the race, despite Walton winning the Democratic nomination. On November 3, Brown defeated Walton in the general election by 19.17%.

=== 2025 New York City mayoral election ===
In the 2025 New York City Democratic mayoral primary, Zohran Mamdani became the presumptive nominee after defeating Andrew Cuomo and other candidates. Cuomo had formed the Fight and Deliver Party before the primary to run in the general election. After his defeat, it was confirmed that Cuomo would continue to run in the general election and not withdraw his candidacy, although he was reportedly still deciding whether to actively campaign. Cuomo eventually announced he planned to run and campaign in the general election. Cuomo lost to Mamdani in the general election on November 4, 2025.
