= NACA (disambiguation) =

NACA is the National Advisory Committee for Aeronautics, a former space agency of the United States government, now replaced by NASA.

NACA may also refer to:

== Organizations ==
- National Agricultural Chemicals Association, involved with pesticide regulation in the United States
- National Association for Campus Activities, an organization for programmers of university and college activities
- National Association of Consumer Advocates, a member organization of the Leadership Conference on Civil and Human Rights
- National Athletic and Cycling Association, a sports organization of Ireland
- Neighborhood Assistance Corporation of America, a non-profit community organization where Detria Russell worked
- Network of Aquaculture Centres in Asia-Pacific, an intergovernmental organization that promotes rural development through sustainable aquaculture
- National Civil Aviation Agency (Mauritania)
- Native American Community Academy
- Northern Alberta Curling Association, the regional governing body for the sport of curling in Northern Alberta, incorporated into Curling Alberta in 2018

== Science and technology ==
- NACA (gene), a human gene
- NACA duct, a type of air intake for an engine
- NACA airfoil, airfoil shapes for aircraft wings developed by NACA
- NACA cowling, a type of aerodynamic fairing used to streamline radial engines for use on airplanes
- N-Acetylcysteine amide, an amide derivative of N-acetylcysteine

== People ==
- Kristin Naca, an American poet
- Mihai Naca (1939 – 2009), a Romanian rugby union coach
- Naca Seru (born 1969), a Fijian rugby union football player
