= Agence Nationale de l'Aviation Civil =

Agence Nationale de l'Aviation Civil may refer to:

- Agence Nationale de l'Aviation Civil (Gabon)
- Agence Nationale de l'Aviation Civil (Niger)

== See also ==
- Agence nationale de l'aviation civile (disambiguation)
- National Civil Aviation Agency
