= India Walton =

American political activist (born 1982)

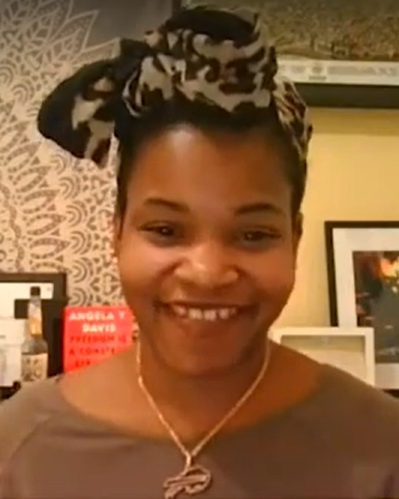
- Walton in 2022

Personal details
- Born: June 14, 1982 (age 44) Buffalo, New York, U.S.
- Party: Democratic
- Spouse: Vernon Walton
- Children: 4
- Education: State University of New York, Erie (AS)
- Website: Campaign website

India B. Walton (née Suttles; born June 14, 1982) is an American political activist and nurse. In 2021, she defeated incumbent Byron Brown in the Democratic Party primary for mayor of Buffalo, New York, before losing to Brown in the general election, where he ran as a write-in candidate. In the 2026 New York gubernatorial election, Democratic candidate Antonio Delgado selected Walton as his running mate for lieutenant governor before he withdrew from the primary.

== Early life and education ==
Walton was born on the east side of Buffalo, New York to Doris Siddiq and Louis Kelly. She was raised by her mother, who was a pharmacy technician, with five siblings. She attended Lorraine Elementary and Leonardo da Vinci High School. Walton gave birth to her first child when she was fourteen, dropped out of high school, worked at Family Dollar and McDonald's, and lived in a group home for young mothers. She married Vernon Walton Jr. and left high school after giving birth to twin sons at the age of nineteen. Walton later earned a General Educational Development certificate and graduated with a nursing degree from SUNY Erie. She has said she decided to pursue a career in nursing after her experience following the birth of her twins, who were born premature and required months of intensive care. She later gave birth to another son.

After she completed her nursing degree, she began work at Children's Hospital. In 2014, she was arrested on a charge of harassment, and the case was dismissed by the court. In 2014, she also moved out of her home due to what she has described as abuse and physical violence by her husband, and later divorced her husband after an attempt to reconcile in 2015 was unsuccessful.

== Career ==
=== Activism ===
Walton became active in politics at the age of twelve when she protested Rockefeller Drug Laws with her mother as part of the activist group Families Against Mandatory Minimums. While working as a nurse, she served as a representative for 1199SEIU United Healthcare Workers East. In 2016, after participating in meetings held by the Community First Alliance, a local organization focused on advocacy for residents in the majority-Black Fruit Belt neighborhood, she held a protest against parking practices in the neighborhood. She left her nursing career after being hired by Open Buffalo as a community organizer with a focus on criminal justice and policing reforms. In 2017, she became executive director of Fruit Belt Community Land Trust.

She was also a leader in local Black Lives Matter protests, and advocated for Mayor Byron Brown to sign Cariol's Law. She has said the shoving of Martin Gugino by a Buffalo police officer was one of her inspirations to run for political office.

=== Mayoral campaign ===
Walton announced her campaign for the mayoralty of Buffalo in the 2021 election on December 13, 2020. During the primary campaign, Byron Brown, who had served as mayor for four terms, refused to debate Walton. The Working Families Party endorsed and supported Walton during her campaign, after having previously endorsed Brown in his past campaigns. She was also endorsed by the Democratic Socialists of America and the Buffalo Teachers Federation, a union with 3800 members. Walton defeated Brown and Le'Candice Durham in the primary election on June 22, 2021, 52 to 45 percent. After her primary win, The Buffalo News reported, "observers saw Walton's win as yet another signal that a dynamic candidate can knock off a complacent incumbent anytime, anywhere – which might just encourage more challengers to take on long-serving elected officials elsewhere in New York and beyond."

During the course of her campaign, Walton was endorsed by Senate Majority Leader Chuck Schumer, Senator Kirsten Gillibrand, and New York City public advocate Jumaane Williams, and supported by Senator Bernie Sanders, Senator Elizabeth Warren, and Representative Alexandria Ocasio-Cortez. She was also endorsed by the Erie County Democratic Committee. Her campaign raised $150,000 compared to Brown, who raised over $500,000 and received support from the Police Benevolent Association and Republicans. On October 23, 2021, CNN reported the mayoral election "escalated over the summer and into the fall as a proxy fight between the city and state's growing progressive movement and more business-friendly, establishment Democrats determined to block Walton's ascent".

Walton is a democratic socialist, and a member of the Democratic Socialists of America. In an interview with Rolling Stone, published in July 2021, she stated, "It's my responsibility to explain to folks that being a democratic socialist does not mean that I'm interested in seizing people’s private property." During a mayoral election debate in late October 2021, in response to Brown stating, "I don't see Ms. Walton as a Democrat," she replied, "I won the Democratic primary. Secondly, I am a self-avowed democratic socialist. The first word in that is 'Democrat.'"

If elected in the general election, she would have been the first socialist mayor of a large city since Frank Zeidler left office as mayor of Milwaukee in 1960, and she would have been the first socialist mayor in New York since John H. Gibbons was elected mayor of Lackawanna in 1919. She would have also been the first woman to serve as mayor of Buffalo.

After his primary election defeat to Walton, Brown announced a write-in campaign, after his lawsuit that sought to add his name to the ballot was unsuccessful. On November 3, 2021, Walton publicly acknowledged that she did not appear to be the winner of the election, while votes were still being counted, but did not officially concede. According to The Buffalo News on November 6, 2021, despite her apparent loss, "Walton may have awakened a potent progressive force in Buffalo politics." On November 8, 2021, Politico reported she joined advocacy for Brown to be removed from his position in the Democratic National Committee. Walton received a letter of support from Barack Obama following her election loss. In an interview with WGRZ, Walton stated that Obama's letter to her, "sort of put the final stamp of approval that I was doing the right thing."

=== Working Families Party ===
Following the mayoral election, the Working Families Party announced Walton's new role with them as a Senior Advisor for Special Projects. In an article by Spectrum News, Walton spoke about the role, stating, "I’m so excited to work with the WFP to build power for the multiracial working class and elect a new generation of progressive leaders in this state."

=== Common Council campaign ===
On February 1, 2023, Walton announced she would run for a seat on the Buffalo Common Council. On February 11, Democratic incumbent Ulysses Wingo, Sr. announced he would not seek re-election. In response, Walton said, "I think that it's a good decision, and there's time to make way for new ideas."

In April, two community activists filed a complaint with the Erie County Board of Elections claiming Walton was not eligible to run based on not meeting residency requirements. The board ruled they did not have the authority to disqualify Walton from the race for residency reasons, and ruled they could not certify her for the Working Families Party ballot line in the November general election because her nomination petitions did not state she is a commissioner of deeds.

Walton was endorsed by the Working Families Party and competed in the Democratic primary in June 2023. Her opponents were Murray Holman, the executive director of the Stop the Violence Coalition in Buffalo, and Zeneta B. Everhart, a staffer for state senator Tim Kennedy who was endorsed by the Erie County Democratic Committee. Everhart won the June 27 Democratic primary, while Walton indicated that she would appear on the general election ballot as the nominee of the Working Families Party.

=== 2026 campaign for Lieutenant Governor ===
On February 4, 2026, Walton was chosen as the running mate for incumbent lieutenant governor Antonio Delgado for the 2026 gubernatorial election. Delgado was challenging incumbent governor Kathy Hochul in the Democratic primary. On February 10, Delgado and Walton announced that they were withdrawing from the race.

== Political positions ==
During her mayoral campaign, she supported the creation of a publicly-run bank, neighborhood-owned grocery stores, a municipal broadband network, and support for homeowners with delinquent property taxes due to job loss or medical emergency. She supported increased funding for public schools and a moratorium on the creation of new charter schools, and said she would make Buffalo a sanctuary city. She also expressed support for small business owners and landlords, including financing to small landlords for building maintenance including lead removal, as well as strengthening Buffalo tenant protections. In October 2021, after Walton revealed the impoundment of her car due to unpaid parking tickets and an expired inspection, she described the experience as indicating a need for the city government to focus on how to support residents with the management of fines and fees. In 2021, Walton said she would decrease the budget of the Buffalo Police Department by $7.5 million by having unarmed first responders, rather than police, answer mental health calls or enforce minor traffic violations. She also supports establishing a civilian police oversight board.

== Electoral history ==
2021 Buffalo mayoral election
Primary election
Party	Candidate	Votes	%
Democratic	India Walton	11,132	51.85
Democratic	Byron Brown (incumbent)	9,625	44.83
Democratic	Le’Candice Durham	650	3.03
Write-in		62	0.29
Total votes		21,469	100.00
General election
Independent	Byron Brown (incumbent, write-in)	38,338	59.57
Democratic	India Walton	25,773	39.88
Independent	Ben Carlisle (write-in)	219	0.34
Republican	Jaz Miles (write-in)	23	0.04
Republican	William O'Dell (write-in)	8	0.01
Total votes		64,361	100.00
Independent gain from Democratic			
