= ANACS =

ANACS may refer to:

- Agence Nationale de l'Aviation Civile et de la Météorologie (Senegal)
- ANACS (coin grading company)

== See also ==
- ANAC (disambiguation)
