= Ministry of Transport (Gabon) =

Government ministry of Gabon

The Ministry of Transport (French: Ministère des Transports) is a government ministry of Gabon, headquartered in the Immeuble Interministériel (Interministerial Building) in Libreville. As of 2015 the current minister is Paulette Megue M'Owono.

The Bureau d'Enquêtes Incidents et Accidents d'Aviation (BEIAA), Gabon's civil aviation accident agency, is an agency of the ministry. It was created by Decree No. 00804 of 19 October 2009.

== See also ==
- Agence Nationale de l'Aviation Civil
