= C5H10N2O2S =

The molecular formula C_{5}H_{10}N_{2}O_{2}S (molar mass: 162.21 g/mol, exact mass: 162.0463 u) may refer to:

- Acetylcysteinamide, or N-Acetylcysteine amide
- Methomyl
