= Journal of the Association of Nurses in AIDS Care =

- Discipline: Nursing
- Language: English
- Edited by: Lucy Bradley-Springer

Publication details
- History: 1989-present
- Publisher: Wolters Kluwer (Netherlands)
- Frequency: Bimonthly
- Impact factor: 1.318 (2016)

Standard abbreviations
- ISO 4: J. Assoc. Nurses AIDS Care

Indexing
- ISSN: 1055-3290 (print); 1552-6917 (web)
- OCLC no.: 23155223

Links
- Journal homepage; Online access

The Journal of the Association of Nurses in AIDS Care, often abbreviated as JANAC, is a bimonthly peer-reviewed nursing journal and the official journal of the Association of Nurses in AIDS Care published by Wolters Kluwer. The journal covers a broad spectrum of issues in HIV infection: education, treatment, prevention, research, clinical practice issues, advocacy, policy, and program development.

== Article categories ==
The journal publishes editorials, featured articles, case studies, briefs, commentaries, media reviews, and letters to the editors.

== Abstracting and indexing ==
The journal is abstracted and indexed in MEDLINE, CINAHL, Science Citation Index Expanded, Family & Society Studies Worldwide, Health and Safety Science Abstracts, International Nursing Index, Pollution Abstracts, PsycLIT, PsycINFO, Psychological Abstracts, and Virology and AIDS Abstracts. According to the 2011 Journal Citation Reports, the journal has an impact factor of 1.09, ranking it 31 out of 97 journals in the Nursing category.

== History ==
The inaugural issue was published in August 1989 by Medical World Business Press (Old Bridge, New Jersey). In 1991, NurseCom became the publisher and the journal was expanded to four issues per year. The founding editor was Jeanne Kalinoski, who served in that position from 1988 to 1996. She later recounted that she "had to face the awful fact that we had empty pockets, no publisher, no advertisers, and no manuscripts, let alone a system for peer review of those proposed articles." Kalinoski persevered and the journal "reported a doubling of ad pages and revenue every year for its first 8 years."

Richard Sowell, who had served as assistant editor under Kalinoski, was the journal's second editor and served in that position for 11 years (1996–2007). He guided the journal through a period of growth in which it "became a journal of choice for a growing cohort of authors from a variety of disciplines." During Sowell's tenure as editor, the journal expanded to six issues per year, increased the number of pages published per issue, and developed strong funding lines. NurseCom remained the publisher until 1997, SAGE Publications was the publisher from 1997 to 2005, followed by Elsevier in 2005, and Wolters Kluwer in 2019.

Lucy Bradley-Springer succeeded Sowell in June 2007.
