= Fruit Belt Gang =

- Founded: 60s—70s
- Named after: Fruit Belt
- Territory: Areas of Fruit Belt and some surrounding areas
- Ethnicity: Primarily African American
- Activities: Racketeering, Murder
- Rivals: Central Park Gang

Fruit Belt Gang also known as the Fruit Belt Posse, is a street gang based in Buffalo, New York in the Fruit Belt area and is the direct opposition to the Central Park Gang.

== History ==
The gang was originally established in the Fruit Belt area during the 1960s and 1970s during the rise of the African American community inside that neighborhood. The gang instituted violence in the area and perpetuated it heavily in the coming years of the 1980s and 1990s and started gaining infamy in that time. The group's establishment was centered around Jefferson Avenue and the surrounding area of Cold Springs in Buffalo. After the establishment of the Central Park Gangs, violence has been rampant between the two gangs in the area of Fruit Belt and Cold Springs and many shootings in the area are due to the violence between the two gangs.

Many shootings that occur in the name of the Fruit Belt gang happen on the street called Grape Street which is located near the founding territory of Jefferson Avenue and the corner of High Street, which is also the area of another rival gang further down known as the Central Park Gang.

Many projects and organizations have been made to combat youth gang membership including city peacemakers known colloquially as the Buffalo Peacemakers and Back to Basics Outreach Ministries attempt to stop minors from getting involved in gang and other criminal activity.

The group sells illegal narcotics and weaponry over state lines into Pennsylvania in order to finance illegal activity, this was found the Pennsylvania state troopers when they arrested five members associated with the gang travelling with illegal contraband.

On January 23, 2019, at 8 AM, two members of the gang, Shaquelle Coleman and Earl Stone, were arrested after violating parole and hiding out in Jamestown, New York at 214 W. Seventh Street. The arrest was made on West 7th Street in Jamestown by the Jamestown Police Department in a joint investigation with the FBI Streets Task Force where they found quantities of crack cocaine and US$1,000 in cash.

On July 1, 2020, members of the Fruit Belt Gang murdered rival member Shariff Jackson near Canisius High School on Delaware Avenue in Elmwood Village.

On July 4, 2020, members of the Fruit Belt Gang, Antwaine Parker and Michael Woods, were shot by Central Park Gang members and transported to a hospital where Woods threw a gun away at the scene before being transported which caused both members to face illegal gun possession charges which they both pleaded guilty to in September of the same year. The shooting was in retaliation for the murder of Central Park Gang member Shariff Jackson by the Fruit Belt Gang.

On March 23, 2022, Jamestown Police arrested three Fruit Belt Gang members from Buffalo in connection with a shooting that occurred on Jefferson Street where, police say, suspects in two vehicles exchanged gunfire before fleeing; a subsequent investigation led to the arrest of Joel Coleman, Allen Jackson, and Arkeil Gaskin, with multiple loaded firearms recovered and one vehicle found with a bullet hole.
