= Martin Luther King Sr. Community Resources Collaborative =

Martin Luther King Sr. Community Resources Collaborative

The Martin Luther King Sr. Community Resources Collaborative named after the late Reverend turned community activist Martin Luther King Sr., held its official dedication ceremony, November 4, 2012. The 8-million-dollar brick complex is located at 101 Jackson Street NE, in the "National Historic King District," of Atlanta, Georgia, which is also known as the Sweet Auburn and Old Fourth Ward Districts. The Collaborative, often referred to as the MLK Sr. CRC, is three stories tall and houses the fellowship hall of Historic Ebenezer Baptist Church, where Reverend King Sr. once pastored and co-pastored with his son Dr. Martin Luther King Jr. Also serving as a mini historical museum, the Collaborative, houses and displays relics from Reverend King Sr., such as his sermon notes, documents, clothing, pictures and the original church organ that his late wife, Alberta Christine Williams King played during Ebenezer services.

Containing a commercial grade kitchen and conference/exhibit hall, the Collaborative is frequently rented and utilized for private, corporate and government meetings and functions. However, one of the main purposes of building the expansive Collaborative was to create and maintain an ongoing community partnership of local and national non-profit agencies focusing on improving and enhancing the lives of underserved children and families residing in the Sweet Auburn and Old Fourth Ward geographic areas, as well as, surrounding Fulton counties in Atlanta. Detailed programs focused on Literacy/Education, Financial Literacy, Housing, Employment Services and overall Family Enhancement are administered to participants via in-house non-profit community partners: Ebenezer Baptist Church, Casey Family Programs, Operation Hope and Enroll America, as well as, services and programs from community referral partner agencies. The community Cyber Cafe hosted by Operation Hope, as well as, office and suite space for the Collaborative's in house community partners, along with the Collaborative's Executive Director, Detria Russell is located throughout the Martin Luther King Sr. Community Resources Collaborative's three floors. Because the Collaborative is located in the "National Historic King District," The National Park Service administers the Collaborative's parking lot and surrounding land, which includes the old Historic Ebenezer Baptist Church building, Dr. Martin Luther King Jr.'s birth home and gravesite, as well as, a community playground.
