= Leonardo da Vinci High School (Buffalo, New York) =

Coordinates: 42.9023°N 78.8904°W

Leonardo DaVinci High School
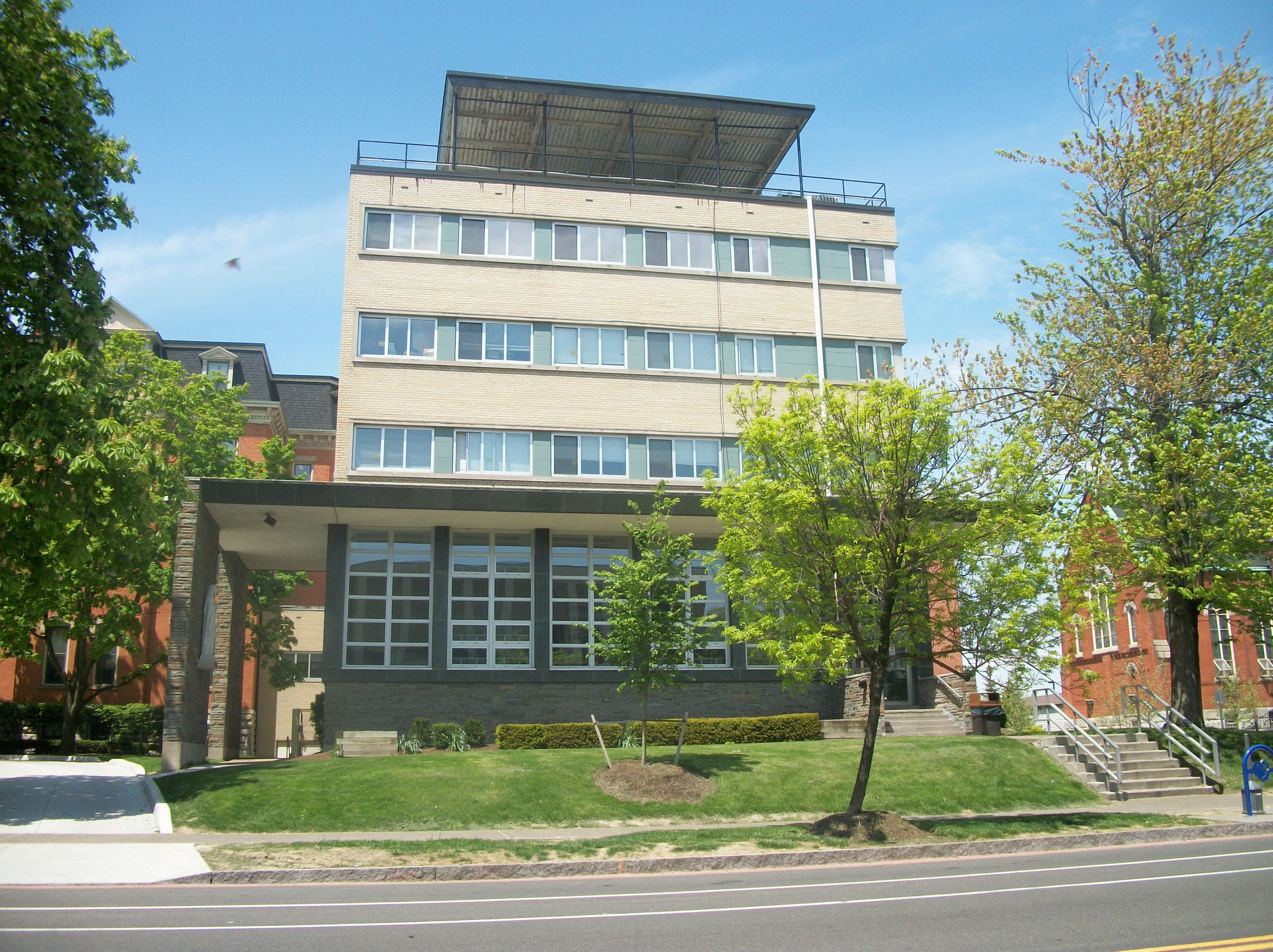

Location
- 167 East Utica Street; East Side; Buffalo, Erie County, New York 14208; United States

Information
- School number: 212
- Principal: Leslie Potempa
- Grades: 9–12
- Colors: Silver and Blue
- Team name: Dragons
- Website: www.buffaloschools.org/PS212

Leonardo da Vinci High School is a high school temporarily housed on the east side of Buffalo, New York. There are 400 students enrolled in da Vinci spanning grades 9–12. The high school serves Grades 9 through 12. The current principal is Leslie Potempa.

== History ==
Leonardo da Vinci was originally housed on the 4th Floor of the Koessler Administration Building (KAB) on the D'Youville College Campus and shared space with the Grover Cleveland High School for electives. The school moved to Madonna Hall building on the D'Youville College campus. Students who attended DaVinci had the opportunity to take college credit-bearing classes from D'Youville. In August 2023, the school was temporarily relocated to 167 East Utica Street.

== Sports ==
Leonardo da Vinci High School offers varsity sports including:

- Soccer
- Volleyball (Female only)
- Cross Country
- Swimming
- Bowling
- Basketball
- Softball/Baseball
- Track
- Tennis

Students who are interested in playing a sport da Vinci does not offer are able to try out at Hutchinson Central Technical High School.

== Student statistics ==
Ethnicity	Leonardo da Vinci	New York State Average
White, non-Hispanic	48%	53%
Black, non-Hispanic	40%	20%
Hispanic	9%	20%
Asian/Pacific Islander	2%	7%
American Indian	1%	<1%

	Leonardo da Vinci	New York State Average
Attendance Rate	98%	93%

== Teacher statistics ==
	This school	State average
Average years teaching	20	14
Average years teaching in district	16	11
First year teachers	0%	5%

	This school	State average
Bachelor's Degree	19%	20%
Master's degree	81%	79%
Doctorate degree	0%	<1%

	This school	State average
Students per teacher	17	14

== Notable alumni ==
- India Walton – American political activist, democratic socialist
