= Ministry of Transport (Ivory Coast) =

Government ministry in the Ivory Coast

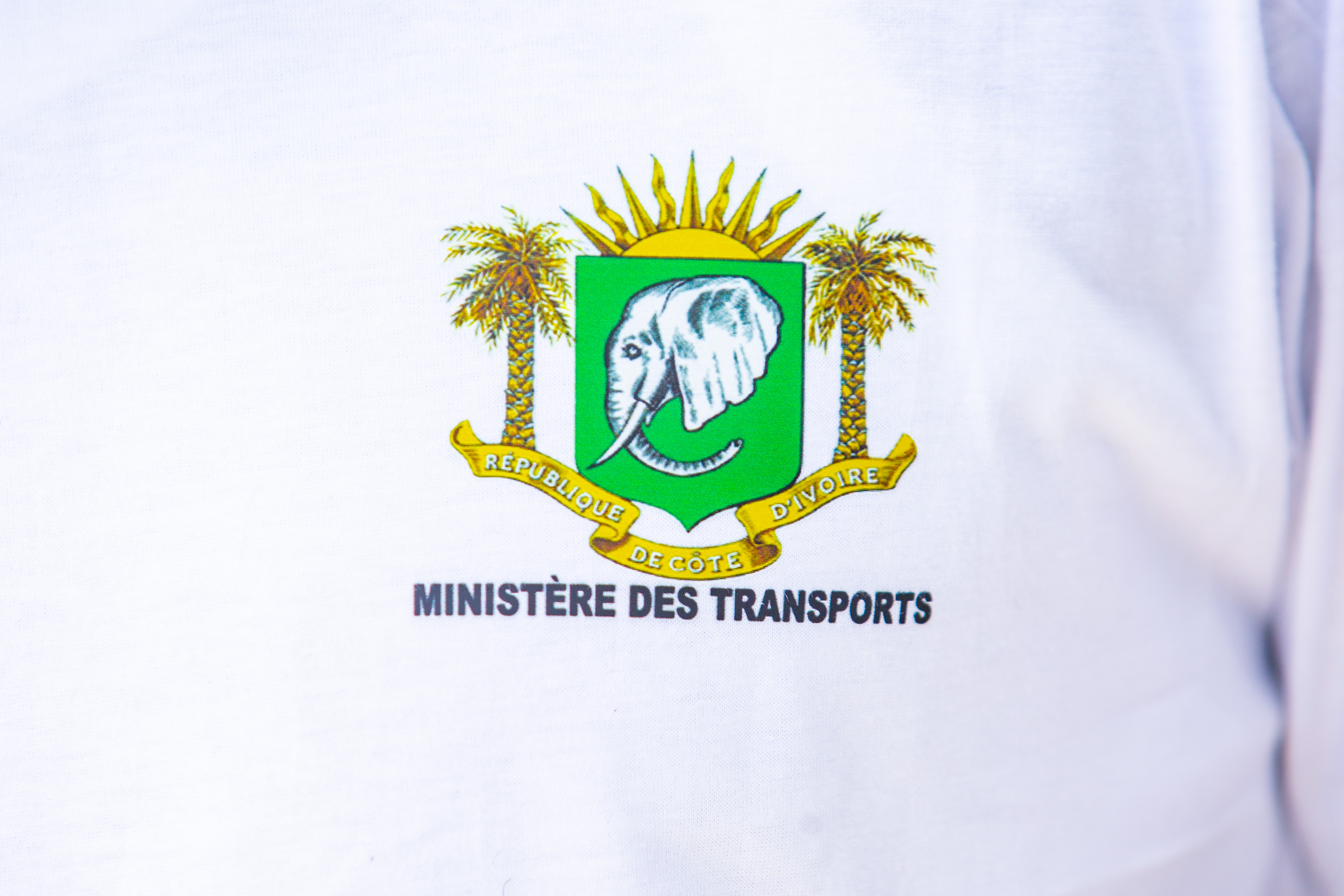

The Ministry of Transport (French: Ministère des Transports) is a government ministry in the Ivory Coast. The Autorité Nationale de l'Aviation Civile (ANAC), the civil aviation agency, is subservient to it.
