= Auckland Nuclear Accessory Company =

Former New Zealand company

- Founded: 1966
- Defunct: 1982
- Fate: Receivership
- Headquarters: Auckland, New Zealand

The Auckland Nuclear Accessory Company (ANAC) was one of the earliest technology companies in New Zealand. It was started in 1966 in Auckland by a group of physicists and technicians from the University of Auckland nuclear research laboratory (AURA II) primarily to commercialise the polarised ion source developed there. It initially had three shareholders: Professor Edwin R. Collins and two of his senior research students, Barry A. MacKinnon and Hilton F. Glavish. The company grew and supplied products and instruments to other research institutions and commercial companies around the world. Manufacturing was done in Auckland, and they later had a sales office in Santa Clara, California and an agent (SENTEC) in Geneva Switzerland. In 1979 it received the American Chamber of Commerce Export Award.

The company's speciality was high precision electromagnets incorporating vacuum resin impregnated coil structures. They also developed and sold other products which were initially invented by New Zealand and Australian government funded agencies such as the DSE (Defense Scientific Establishment) and National Standards Laboratory, Sydney. These included a high sensitivity inclinometer (ANAC Model 300) used for earthquake and volcanic research and a gray scale printer/plotter (ANAC Model 910) for display of time varying phenomena.

The company produced polarized ion sources for use in nuclear research accelerators. This was pioneered at the University of Auckland's AURA II nuclear research accelerator by physicist Hilton Glavish. They developed an electronic control system (similar to modern day PLCs) to cope with the high voltage isolation and difficult electrical noise environment of nuclear ion sources and accelerators. Called the "700 System", it was later sold to SENTEC of Switzerland after the collapse of ANAC.

The company was placed into receivership in late 1982 and ceased operating. Much of the engineering work and electromagnet construction was taken over by Buckley Engineering, later to become Buckley Systems Ltd.
