= Association of Nurses in AIDS Care =

US professional association

Association of Nurses in AIDS Care (ANAC) is a national nursing organization in the United States which specializes in the care of individuals infected with HIV. It is based in Akron, Ohio, and was founded in 1987.

Its official journal is the Journal of the Association of Nurses in AIDS Care (JANAC), which is published on behalf of ANAC by Elsevier.
