= Detria Russell =

Detria Austin Everson (Russell)
- Born: August 21, 1973 (age 53); Little Rock, Arkansas
- Education: University of Arkansas at Little Rock (1997); Spelman College (1995)
- Occupations: John and Lillian Miles Lewis Foundation
- Spouse(s): Late Jason Russell (2011-2018); Eddie C Everson, Jr (2022)

Detria Austin Everson (born August 21, 1973) is a nationally recognized speaker and author and the former chief executive officer of the John and Lillian Miles Lewis Foundation located in Atlanta, Georgia.

== Biography ==
=== Author and Speaker ===
In 2026, Detria Austin Everson authored and published her first book, Serving Is a Superpower, a work centered on servant leadership and the transformative power of service. Following the book’s publication, she launched Serving Is a Superpower at www.servingisasuperpower.com.

Through OMS Solutions LLC, Everson expanded her professional platform to include speaking and consulting engagements focused on leadership, service, philanthropy, social impact, and organizational strategy. She launched her speaking and professional consulting platform at www.detriaaustineverson.com, positioning her work to support organizations, corporations, nonprofits, and civic institutions through keynote speaking, leadership development, strategic consulting, and mission-driven engagement. Her work through OMS Solutions LLC and the Serving Is a Superpower platform is part of her broader commitment to advancing servant leadership and impacting people on an individual, organizational, and community level.

=== Community Activism and Outreach ===
Since joining the local chapter of the Pine Bluff, Arkansas NAACP in 1995, Detria has fought for the civil rights and empowerment of socially and economically disadvantaged and underserved individuals throughout the United States via her volunteerism, club affiliations and diverse group of employers. Boasting many national community activism achievements in the medical arena and in affecting national housing initiatives, two of the most notable achievements for Detria are being appointed the first African American administrative fellow at MCG Health Inc. in 2000 and planning and participating in the shut down of global conglomerate Bear Stearns in 2008. Detria continued her advocacy in the social justice arena by leading the execution of the first Fulton County Georgia Record Restriction event in 2016 and playing an integral role in the first Ending Mass Incarceration conference hosted in Atlanta, Georgia in 2019. This effort was led by Pastor Raphael Warnock, Senior Pastor of the Historic Ebenezer Baptist Church. It garnered support from Rapper TI and the event recognized Members of the Central Park Five. A critical output from this event is the Faith In Action Toolkit , in which Detria is featured and made significant contribution.

=== Early Life/Education ===
Detria L. Austin was born August 21, 1973, in Little Rock, Arkansas, to Alfred and Margaret Austin. She grew up in family businesses and learned business management and community outreach skills during this time. She graduated from Spelman College with a Bachelor of Science in Biology in 1995 and went on to pursue studies at the University of Arkansas at Little Rock, where she received a Master of Health Services Administration in 1997. Ms. Austin was an inaugural fellow of the Health Advisory Board and completed the Diversity in Healthcare Management program. Ms. Austin is an alumnus of both Leadership Augusta, Georgia and Leadership Pine Bluff, Arkansas. Ms. Austin became Mrs. Russell, when she married boyfriend Jason Russell February 5, 2011. After the passing of her first husband, she remarried years later to Eddie C. Everson Jr. She is an active member of Alpha Kappa Alpha Sorority Incorporated, Junior League of Atlanta, Spelman College Alumnae Association, NAACP and is an empowerment champion, housing and financial literacy advocate and enjoys mentoring young women and children. Mrs. Everson resides in Atlanta, Georgia.

=== Notable Employers ===
In November 2023, Detria was appointed as Chief Executive Officer (CEO) of the John and Lillian Miles Lewis Foundation. This 501c3 organization was founded by Congressman John Lewis in 2017. The purpose is to share the lives and legacy of Congressman John Lewis and his wife Lillian.

In January 2015, Detria became executive director for the Martin Luther King Sr. Community Resources Collaborative (MLK Sr. CRC), an alliance of national and local non-profit organizations focused on eradicating poverty and hopelessness in Atlanta's "Old Fourth Ward", and "Sweet Auburn," districts. Detria was charged with the responsibility of fostering a working network of free and low cost community services, via national and local community partners, to the underserved residents of the "Old Fourth Ward," and "Sweet Auburn." areas. Since the Collaborative's 2012 opening, Russell is the most notable executive director as she is the founding Executive Director, who established the IRS 501c3 designation upon her arrival in 2015. Former leaders of the Collaborative are Dawn Brown and Lawrence Torry Winn.

Prior to becoming executive director for the MLK Sr. CRC, from May 2006 to July 2014, Detria worked for controversial national non-profit housing agency, Neighborhood Assistance Corporation of America (NACA). Detria served in several roles, with her last role being chief operating officer and governmental affairs/outreach liaison, whereas she worked under the direct leadership of chief executive officer Bruce Marks. While serving in her last leadership role at NACA, Detria fostered NACA's partnerships with national and local government leaders, agencies and other non-profits, while managing a large operations team to include over 40 NACA offices.

With a strong background in healthcare administrative services, Russell was a fellow at Georgia Regents University (Formerly known as Medical College of Georgia) and from 2004 to 2006, she held the position of assistant vice president of MCG Health, Inc., overseeing operations for the Medical Center and Children's Medical Center, in addition to, other MCG facilities. Detria managed a number of MCG services including food/beverage contracts with McDonald's, volunteer and greeter services and the hospitals' cafeterias, the Mason Trust Kidney Transplant Grant, as well as, its gift shops. During her tenure at MCG, to ensure non-English-speaking patients received the best medical services available to them, Detria was instrumental in developing and managing MCG's new Culturally and Linguistically Appropriate Services Department, which currently provides, expansive services such as, translators for the health care staff and non-English-speaking patients. Detria was selected as a fellow with the Institute for Diversity in Healthcare Management.

=== Awards ===
- 2026 Festival of the Diaspora Honoree FOTD2026
- Top 40 under 40 - Georgia Chamber of Commerce, Georgia Trend Magazine - October, 2004
- Young Gifted and Black - Georgia Times -
- Trailblazers for the New Millennium - University of Arkansas at Pine Bluff’
- Member of the Year - NAACP, Pine Bluff Arkansas Branch
- Volunteer of the Year - Delta Omega Omega Chapter, Alpha Kappa Alpha Sorority, Inc.

== See also ==
- Martin Luther King Sr. Community Resources Collaborative Complex
- Neighborhood Assistance Corporation of America (NACA)
