= Agence Nationale de l'Aviation Civile (Burkina Faso) =

Civil aviation agency of Burkina Faso

The Agence Nationale de l’Aviation Civile is the civil aviation agency of Burkina Faso. Its head office is in Ouagadougou.
