= Autorité Nationale de l'Aviation Civile =

Civil aviation authority of Ivory Coast

The Autorité Nationale de l'Aviation Civile (ANAC) is the civil aviation authority of the Ivory Coast (Côte d'Ivoire), subservient to the Ministry of Transport. Its head office is in Abidjan. It serves as the air accident investigation authority of the country. ANAC is a public institution with national competence and has technical and management autonomy. It was created by the Ivorian State by Law 0021/2005 of March 11, 2005. The Ivorian government announced the official launch of ANAC by Transport Minister Albert Mabri Toikeusse on October 30, 2008.
