= National Civil Aviation Agency (Mauritania) =

The National Civil Aviation Agency (NACA; French: Agence Nationale de l’Aviation Civile, ANAC; Arabic: الوكالة الوطنية للطيران المدني (acronym: و.و.ط.م.)) is the civil aviation agency of Mauritania. Its head office is in Nouakchott.

It was established in 2004 under decree # 2004–079.
