= Families Against Mandatory Minimums =

American nonprofit organization

Families Against Mandatory Minimums (FAMM) is an American nonprofit advocacy organization founded in 1991 to challenge mandatory sentencing laws and advocate for criminal justice reform. FAMM promotes sentencing policies that give judges the discretion to distinguish between defendants and sentence them according to their role in the offense, the seriousness of the offense, and their potential for rehabilitation. FAMM's members include prisoners and their families, attorneys, judges, criminal justice experts, and concerned citizens. In 2018, The Washington Post described FAMM as "one of the leading organizations that have pushed for criminal justice changes."

The organization's founder, Julie Stewart, started FAMM shortly after her brother was convicted of growing marijuana plants near his home and given a mandatory five year federal prison sentence.

FAMM organized lobbying efforts in support of the First Step Act, a law which reforms the U.S. federal prison system and seeks to reduce recidivism and decrease the federal inmate population. The organizers succeeded in their efforts and the Act was passed by the 115th Congress and signed into law in December 2018. It changed U.S. federal criminal sentencing laws, among other reforms.

== See also ==
- Incarceration in the United States
- War on drugs
