= Fruit Belt, Buffalo =

Neighborhood

Coordinates: 42.900°N 78.857°W

The Fruit Belt (Medical Park) is a residential neighborhood in Buffalo, New York. It is located adjacent to the Buffalo Niagara Medical Campus.

== Geography ==
The Fruit Belt is located within the East Side of Buffalo. The neighborhood is centered along High Street running west–east and Jefferson Avenue running north–south. It is enclosed along its eastern boundary by the Kensington Expressway and Michigan Avenue as its Western Boundary, separating the Fruit Belt from the Medical Campus.

== History and culture ==
The Fruit Belt neighborhood was first established in June 1835, when the Buffalo Common Council approved a batch of new street names, including Cherry, Maple, Mulberry, Locust, Lemon, Orange, Peach, and Grape. House and building lots first went on the market soon after in September 1835, offered by out-of-town investors from Albany and New York City.

It is difficult to find evidence of whether the land was used for agricultural, including fruit-growing, purposes before or after being subdivided for residential and commercial development.

The Fruit Belt nickname first appeared in print in August 1934, when residents of Mulberry Street held a carnival to celebrate when their cobblestone streets were paved over.

The area remained a tight-knit neighborhood until the 1950s, when construction of the Kensington Expressway split the neighborhood in half.

In the last several decades, the neighborhood has experienced a decline. Due to Buffalo's encouragement of the rebranding as a Medical Park, there has been significant investment. But that influx of money and development has been focused on demolishing older houses dating back to the 1800s to build brand-new medical buildings to employ surrounding residents. Tenants and homeowners in the neighborhood have become increasingly active as pressure to reinvigorate the neighborhood has grown.

== Education ==
Marva J. Daniel Futures Preparatory School (formerly Futures Academy) is located in the Fruit Belt.

== See also ==
- Fruit Belt Gang
- Neighborhoods of Buffalo, New York
