= Agence Nationale de l'Aviation Civile (Niger) =

Civil aviation agency of Niger

Agence Nationale de l'Aviation Civil (ANAC-Niger) is the civil aviation agency of Niger. Its head office is in Niamey.
