= Acetylcysteinamide =

Chemical compound

Identifiers
- IUPAC name: (2R)-2-Acetamido-3-sulfanylpropanamide
- CAS Number: 38520-57-9 15394-73-7 (racemic)
- PubChem CID: 9942232
- DrugBank: DB14480
- ChemSpider: 74304
- UNII: 4N69717RKW
- CompTox Dashboard (EPA): DTXSID30436398
- ECHA InfoCard: 100.211.696

Chemical and physical data
- Formula: C_{5}H_{10}N_{2}O_{2}S
- Molar mass: 162.21 g·mol^{−1}
- 3D model (JSmol): Interactive image
- Density: 1.227 g/cm^{3}
- Boiling point: 308 °C (586 °F)
- Solubility in water: 22 mg/mL (20 °C)
- SMILES: SC[C@H](C(=O)N)NC(=O)C
- InChI: InChI=1S/C5H10N2O2S/c1-3(8)7-4(2-10)5(6)9/h4,10H,2H2,1H3,(H2,6,9)(H,7,8)/t4-/m1/s1; Key:UJCHIZDEQZMODR-SCSAIBSYSA-N

N-Acetylcysteine amide (abbrev. NACA, AD4 and also known as acetylcysteinamide) is an amide derivative of N-acetylcysteine (NAC) that appears to have better blood–brain barrier permeability and bioavailability possessing potential antioxidant and anti-inflammatory activity

When administered, NACA increases glutathione levels. Glutathione neutralizes reactive oxygen species, reduces oxidative stress, and prevents induced cell damage and apoptosis. NACA has increased lipophilicity and membrane permeability compared to NAC.

== Chemical designation ==
This compound belongs to a class of experimental compounds known as N-acyl-alpha-amino acids and their derivatives. These are compounds containing an alpha-amino acid (or its derivative) with an acyl group on the terminal nitrogen atom.

== Pharmacokinetics and pharmacodynamics ==
The pharmacokinetics of NACA remain unclear or unstudied. It is an amide derivative of NAC that is rapidly converted to NAC after systemic administration.

The bioavailability of NACA is significantly higher than NAC (67% and 15%,).

Its mechanism of action involves replenishment of glutathione (GSH), a major antioxidant, and direct neutralization of reactive oxygen species.
