= Agence Nationale de l'Aviation Civile (Gabon) =

Civil aviation agency of Gabon

Agence Nationale de l'Aviation Civil is the civil aviation agency of Gabon. Its head office is in Libreville.

The predecessor agency, the Secrétariat Général à l'Aviation Civile et Commerciale (SGACC), was established in 1972. The current ANAC was established according to law 005/2008 of 11 July 2008.
